= Alias season 2 =

Alias
- Season 2
- Season 2 DVD cover
- No. of episodes: 22

Release
- Original network: ABC
- Original release: September 29, 2002 – May 4, 2003

Season chronology
- ← Previous; Season 1 Next → Season 3

The second season of Alias premiered September 29, 2002 on ABC and concluded May 4, 2003 and was released on DVD in region 1 on December 2, 2003. Guest stars in season two include David Carradine, Ethan Hawke, Richard Lewis, Faye Dunaway, Rutger Hauer, Christian Slater, and Danny Trejo. The thirteenth episode of the season, "Phase One", aired after Super Bowl XXXVII.

== Cast ==
=== Main ===
- Jennifer Garner as Sydney Bristow (22 episodes)
- Ron Rifkin as Arvin Sloane (22 episodes)
- Michael Vartan as Michael Vaughn (22 episodes)
- Bradley Cooper as Will Tippin (19 episodes)
- Merrin Dungey as Francie Calfo and Allison Doren (21 episodes)
- Carl Lumbly as Marcus Dixon (16 episodes)
- Kevin Weisman as Marshall Flinkman (21 episodes)
- David Anders as Julian Sark (15 episodes)
- Lena Olin as Irina Derevko (17 episodes)
- Victor Garber as Jack Bristow (22 episodes)

=== Recurring ===
- Terry O'Quinn as FBI Assistant Director Kendall (16 episodes)
- Greg Grunberg as Eric Weiss (8 episodes)
- Patricia Wettig as Dr. Judy Barnett (4 episodes)
- Faye Dunaway as Ariana Kane (3 episodes)
- Amy Irving as Emily Sloane (3 episodes)
- Amanda Foreman as Carrie Bowman (2 episodes)
- Christian Slater as Dr. Neil Caplan (2 episodes)
- Ric Young as Dr. Zhang Lee (2 episodes)
- Derrick O'Connor as Alexander Khasinau (1 episode)

== Episodes ==
No. overall	No. in season	Title	Directed by	Written by	Original release date	US viewers (millions)
23	1	"The Enemy Walks In"	Ken Olin	J. J. Abrams	September 29, 2002	11.31
Sydney confronts her mother, Irina Derevko, who shoots Sydney in the shoulder and takes her captive. After escaping, Sydney searches for Vaughn, not knowing if he is dead or alive after having been swept away by a wall of water released by the destruction of the full-sized "circumference" device in Taipei. Will learns more about Sydney's clandestine activities as a CIA Agent working as a double agent within SD-6. Marcus Dixon must decide whether or not to inform Sloane of Sydney's suspicious activities.
24	2	"Trust Me"	Craig Zisk	John Eisendrath	October 6, 2002	9.73
icon
25	3	"Cipher"	Dan Attias	Alex Kurtzman & Roberto Orci	October 13, 2002	9.44
Will finally meets Vaughn and Sloane is haunted by his wife's death. Sloane, who drinks only water is seen drinking whiskey in his office. We are told that Emily's garden is dead but Sloane finds it in full bloom.
26	4	"Dead Drop"	Guy Bee	Jesse Alexander	October 20, 2002	10.08
icon
27	5	"The Indicator"	Ken Olin	Jeff Pinkner	November 3, 2002	10.60
Sydney discovers a terrifying secret when she's sent on a case to track down a new generation of weapons. Meanwhile, Vaughn suspects Jack of setting up Irina to take a fall. Sloane tells Jack the truth about Emily's death.
28	6	"Salvation"	Perry Lang	Alex Kurtzman & Roberto Orci	November 10, 2002	9.33
Sydney's trust in her father begins to fade. Meanwhile, Sydney and Vaughn may have been exposed to a deadly virus while in Taipei. Sloane, haunted by Emily's death, begins to unravel. Vaughn enlists Will to help research a case.
29	7	"The Counteragent"	Dan Attias	John Eisendrath	November 17, 2002	9.65
Sydney races to find a cure for Vaughn, but in order to find the antidote, Sydney must make a deal with Sark that could endanger Sloane's life. Meanwhile, Will continues his research for Vaughn and discovers some disturbing inconsistencies involving 20-year-old standardized IQ tests. Sydney finds out that Vaughn has a girlfriend.
30	8	"Passage (Part 1)"	Ken Olin	Debra J. Fisher & Erica Messer	December 1, 2002	9.10
Sydney, Jack and Irina must put aside their differences and go undercover as a loving family in order to seize six nuclear warheads from an abandoned facility in Kashmir. Meanwhile, Sloane announces to a suspicious staff that Sark will be working with SD-6, and later he is contacted by an unknown group claiming that Emily is still alive.
31	9	"Passage (Part 2)"	Ken Olin	Crystal Nix-Hines	December 8, 2002	9.21
Sydney and Jack continue on a mission to take control of six nuclear warheads. Irina meets up with Gerard Cuvee (Note: Derek de Lint as Gerard Cuvee) and we discover where Irina's loyalties lie. Meanwhile, Sloane informs the Alliance that Emily may still be alive.
32	10	"The Abduction"	Nelson McCormick	Alex Kurtzman & Roberto Orci	December 15, 2002	9.59
Jack meets Alliance counterintelligence head Ariana Kane, (Note: Faye Dunaway as Ariana Kane) who is sent in to investigate Emily's disappearance and to discover who is trying to blackmail Sloane. Meanwhile, Marshall is sent on his first mission with Sydney as his partner. Vaughn schedules Will to take a CIA psych test. Francie gets suspicious over Sydney and Will's secretive behavior.
33	11	"A Higher Echelon"	Guy Bee	John Eisendrath	January 5, 2003	9.66
After SD-6 recovers ECHELON software from Gerard Cuvee, Marshall is abducted and tortured by Dr. Zhang Lee. Considering Marshall expendable, Sloane employs an SD-4 replacement. Zhang threatens Marshall's mother, forcing him to rewrite ECHELON from eidetic memory. Kane investigates Emily Sloane's disappearance, forcing the CIA to back-cover Jack's tracks. Sydney's counter-mission to thwart SD-6 is to corrupt data packets in Ho Chi Minh City, but Dixon gets to the hard drive first; SD-6 begins restoring ECHELON, forcing Kendall to allow Irina's unrestricted access to ECHELON. Hired as a CIA Analyst (alias: Trade Roads Journalist), Will cautions Vaughn after learning from Francie about Sydney's "crush." Marshall launches a DDOS on SD-6, revealing his Mexico City location, covering pings by downloading Sammy Hagar's MP3 "Serious Juju" via AudioGalaxy. Vaughn overhears Kane confronting Jack about killing Irina's CIA mole, Steven Haladki (in "Almost Thirty Years"). Jack flees Kane after his cover story is blown. Marshall tricks Zhang, turning ECHELON into Pong, yelling "Go...Straight to Hell!" Sydney and Dixon rescue Marshall. Utilizing her knowledge of Russia's counterpart surveillance system SWARM, Irina locks SD-6 out of ECHELON. Jack gives Sloane leads regarding Emily to avoid being framed by Kane; Sloane immediately calls Kane.
34	12	"The Getaway"	Lawrence Trilling	Jeff Pinkner	January 12, 2003	9.42
While Alliance counterintelligence head Ariana Kane tracks Sydney in order to catch her fugitive father, Jack elicits Irina's help in finding Sloane's blackmailer. Meanwhile, Sydney and Vaughn risk exposing their covers to SD-6 when they share a romantic dinner together while on a case in France.
35	13	"Phase One"	Jack Bender	J. J. Abrams	January 26, 2003	17.36
Sydney and Jack are confronted by the new director of SD-6, Anthony Geiger, (Note: Rutger Hauer as Anthony Geiger) who replaces Sloane, whose whereabouts and intentions are unknown. Sydney learns of information that could destroy SD-6 and shut down the Alliance. Francie is killed by what looks like her doppelganger.
36	14	"Double Agent"	Ken Olin	Alex Kurtzman & Roberto Orci	February 2, 2003	11.39
Sydney, Vaughn and Jack must determine whether CIA Agent James L. Lennox (Note: Ethan Hawke as CIA Agent James L. Lennox) is who he says he is after his deep cover mission is compromised in Berlin. It is discovered that an agency has built a machine capable of replicating a human being's appearance. In this case, there are two agents Lennox at large and Sydney must discover which one is the real one and which one is fake. It is hinted that the machine has been used before to replicate someone else this way.
37	15	"A Free Agent"	Alex Kurtzman	Alex Kurtzman & Roberto Orci	February 9, 2003	10.28
Sydney must make a life-defining decision regarding her future with CIA, while Sloane re-emerges and continues his obsessive quest to piece together the mysterious Rambaldi artifacts—with the reluctant aid of a kidnapped scientist named Neil Caplan. (Note: Christian Slater as Neil Caplan) Meanwhile, Dixon's marriage is put to the test after he tells his wife the truth about his occupation.
38	16	"Firebomb"	Craig Zisk	John Eisendrath	February 23, 2003	8.61
Sloane ingratiates himself to terrorist drug smuggler Ahmad Kabir (Note: Eli Danker as Ahmad Kabir) in order to trade a Rambaldi-designed WMD for a statuette, which is later revealed to contain a missing section of another of Rambaldi's manuscripts. Asked to name a demonstration target, Kabir chooses his ex-wife Alia Gizabi, who is currently attending a religious ceremony at a cathedral with scores of other parishioners. Vaughn begs Dixon to aid the CIA in rescuing Sydney. Will is called upon to participate in a crucial CIA briefing session. Sydney notices that something with Francie is not quite right. Sark sets off Rambaldi's weapon, revealed to be a reusable and adjustable neutron bomb; at only 10% yield, it incinerates 62 people within the church. Rescued by Sydney and horrified by her ex-husband's mass-murder, Alia agrees to help the CIA track down Kabir and the weapon.
39	17	"A Dark Turn"	Ken Olin	Jesse Alexander	March 2, 2003	10.69
Sydney begins to question where Vaughn's allegiances lie when she learns through CIA Agent Mitchell Yaeger (Note: Richard Lewis as Mitchell Yaeger) that Vaughn is under investigation. Meanwhile Irina and another crucial Rambaldi manuscript – concerning the secret of eternal life – are used as bait to try to catch Sloane. It turns out Vaughn had only been investigating Irina through his own means because the Agency was slow and he wanted to see if he could catch her in a lie or discover additional information. Sydney also welcomes Dixon to the CIA.
40	18	"Truth Takes Time"	Nelson McCormick	J. R. Orci	March 16, 2003	9.66
Sydney faces off with her mother, while Emily must decide whether to side with her husband or betray him.
41	19	"Endgame"	Perry Lang	Sean Gerace	March 30, 2003	9.89
Sydney defies her father in her attempt to rescue kidnapped scientist Neil Caplan, while Sloane, seeking revenge for the assassination of his wife orders that Dixon's wife be taken out. Meanwhile, Allison in the guise of Francie manipulates an unsuspecting Will for his agency connections.
42	20	"Countdown"	Lawrence Trilling	R. P. Gaborno & Jeff Pinkner	April 27, 2003	8.03
A Rambaldi manuscript prophesizes that an apocalyptic event involving a heart will soon take place. Assassin Emilio Vargas (Note: Danny Trejo as Emilio Vargas) is sent to Panama to kill Proteo Di Regno and cut out his unique heart. Dixon's grief leads Vaughn and agency psychologist Dr. Barnett to question his intentions, as his thirst for revenge on Sloane intensifies. Sloane receives a life-changing revelation from a mysterious monk named Conrad (Note: David Carradine as Conrad) in Nepal. Sydney and Dixon hunt for the killer to recover the stolen the heart before the prophesied countdown reaches midnight.
43	21	"Second Double"	Ken Olin	Story by : Breen Frazier; Teleplay by : Crystal Nix-Hines	May 4, 2003	10.10
Sydney begins to question Will's identity when he's arrested for espionage, under suspicion of being a double. Meanwhile Sark and Irina plot to recover the Di Regno heart, and Sloane makes Jack a business proposal.
44	22	"The Telling"	J. J. Abrams	J. J. Abrams	May 4, 2003	10.10
Sydney confronts her mother, who reveals her true motivation. Sloane, for his part, begins to execute his new grand plan, Will struggles to figure out who's behind his set-up. Sydney and Allison have a vicious confrontation, which in turn leads to a starling revelation by Vaughn to Sydney!

== Reception ==
Despite earning critical acclaim from USA Today and attracting the largest audience of the series with 17.4 million viewers, "Phase One" retained just 19 percent of the Super Bowl XXXVII audience and has the dubious distinction of earning the lowest overall ratings for a program airing after a Super Bowl since at least 1987 and the lowest rating ever (8.3 rating) in the age 18-49 demographic for a post-Super Bowl program. Much of this can be attributed to the fact that the episode didn't air until 11 p.m. on the East Coast, which also meant it was not eligible for the week's list of top primetime shows ranked by Nielsen Media Research and thus, the episode's viewership numbers were not factored in the series' overall 2002-2003 season average. This late slot was partially due to a decision to include a Bon Jovi performance in the post-game show.

In 2009, TV Guide ranked "The Telling" as #84 on its list of the 100 Greatest Episodes.

== Home release ==
The 6-DVD box set of Season 2 was released in region 1 format (US) on December 2, 2003, in region 2 format (UK) on June 7, 2004 and in region 4 format (AU) on July 4, 2004. The DVDs contain all episodes of Season 2, plus the following features:

- Deleted Scenes
- Gag Reel
- Audio Commentary with cast & crew
- The Making of The Telling – An In-Depth Look at the Season Finale
- The Making of the Video Game
- Featurette: Undercover: The Look of Alias – A Look at Costume Design, Makeup, and Disguises

(A skit filmed for Monday Night Football was advertised as being in the set, but was removed from the DVD set before release.)
