= Julian Sark =

- Alias character
- First appearance: "The Coup" (episode 1.14)
- Last appearance: "All the Time in the World" (episode 5.17)
- Portrayed by: David Anders

In-universe information
- Gender: Male
- Title(s): Senior partner (all save SD-6 and Prophet Five)
- Occupation: Irina Derevko; SD-6; Arvin Sloane; The Covenant; Prophet Five dark brotherhood
- Relatives: Andrian Lazarey (father)

Julian Sark is a recurring fictional character portrayed by David Anders on the ABC television series Alias. The series follows Sydney Bristow, an operative working for an organization called SD-6 which she believes is a covert branch of the Central Intelligence Agency. However, she learns it is actually a subsidiary of the Alliance of Twelve, a crime syndicate which seeks to make profits from stolen intelligence and artifacts. Upon learning the truth Sydney offers her services to the CIA as a double agent with the intention of destroying SD-6 from within.

Julian Sark is introduced in the first season's fourteenth episode, "The Coup", where he is seen meeting the head of K-Directorate in Moscow on behalf of the person known only as "The Man" who intends to purchase Rambaldi's journal. The character appears in 46 more instances, with Anders credited in the title sequence nine times during the course of the show. The last one is the series finale, "All The Time In The World", in which Marcus Dixon asks Sydney to intercept Sark as he attempts to sell a stolen hard disk containing classified information. It is unknown whether the mission was carried out or if the disk was sold.

== Character biography ==
Little is known about Sark's background. He spent most of his youth in the United Kingdom, although a voice analysis reveals he spent a lot of time in Galway, Ireland. He is the heir to a vast fortune from his Romanov-descended father, Andrian Lazarey. He routinely changes his alliances, and his true allegiance seems to be only to himself. He is notorious for his self-described "flexible loyalties" and his ability to evade and escape capture. Sark is a connoisseur of fine champagne.

=== Season 1 ===
Sark is seen initially operating as an agent of a criminal organization headed by a mysterious figure known only as "The Man" (believed at first to be Alexander Khasinau but later revealed to be Irina Derevko). He leads a strike team against FTL Headquarters, personally killing FTL head Quan Li in broad daylight literally outside FTL's front door. The attack, coinciding precisely with McKenas Cole's unsuccessful assault on SD-6, was designed to retrieve an unknown Rambaldi artifact (as Cole's was designed to obtain an ampule of unknown liquid). FTL's operatives list is compromised and within hours, FTL ceases to exist. Arvin Sloane states that this previously unknown organization now has the most significant collection of Rambaldi artifacts in the world.

SD-6 learns of a meeting scheduled between the organization and K-Directorate to discuss the sharing of Rambaldi technology. Sydney and Dixon are tasked to eavesdrop on the meeting. Sark offers to transfer $100 million to K-Directorate's Cayman Islands account. In exchange, he demands the Rambaldi manuscript (which includes Page 47). The offer is rejected, and Sark instantly assassinates Ilyich Ivankov, leader of K-Directorate. The suddenly promoted new leader of K-Directorate, Lavro Kessar, accepts the offer. Sydney, who is dangling outside the window spying on the meeting, is spotted, a firefight ensues and Sark slips away. He is next seen in Tunisia trying to retrieve the Rambaldi manuscript, but Sydney gets to it first.

Sark travels to Denpasar to buy a second ampule of Rambaldi liquid so he can expose a Rambaldi document (possibly the artifact retrieved from FTL). Unknown to him, the buy is a sting set up by Sydney and Michael Vaughn. The buy is disrupted by Dixon and other SD-6 agents. Sark flees with the ampule but Vaughn captures him and recovers it. When Vaughn abandons Sark to rescue Sydney, SD-6 recovers him.

While in SD-6 custody Sark agrees to lead SD-6 to Khasinau in his Paris nightclub to recover the Rambaldi document. Sydney and Dixon are tasked to retrieve the document and replace it with a forgery. Sydney is further tasked by Vaughn to switch out the document with a counterfeit, but is unable to because she spots Will Tippin, who's been brought to Paris to meet a mysterious contact to discuss "The Circumference," in the club. Dixon recovers the document and Sydney extracts Will and, with Jack's aid, returns him to Los Angeles.

Sark escapes from the club, but Sloane had previously laced Sark's wine with a radioactive isotope and is tracking his location by satellite. However, Sark becomes aware of this and undergoes a full blood transfusion in Geneva. While SD-6 is on a wild goose chase to Switzerland, Sark actually returns to Los Angeles and kidnaps Will Tippin from a CIA safehouse. To secure Tippin's release, Jack steals the ampule from the CIA and Sydney steals the document from SD-6. Jack and Sydney expose the page and realize that it's The Circumference, instructions on how to use the Mueller device. Jack travels to Taipei and makes the exchange, and Sark vanishes into the night.

=== Season 2 ===
Sark initially assumes control of Irina's assets but later allies with SD-6, but secretly collaborates with Sloane to provide Sydney with the location of "Server 47," on which is housed enough intelligence to bring about the destruction of The Alliance of Twelve and all SD cells. However, no Rambaldi artifacts are found in any of the SD sites. Following the fall of SD-6, Sark continues to work with Sloane. He kidnaps the wife and son of mathematician Dr. Neil Caplan to coerce Caplan into assembling Rambaldi artifacts into a neutron bomb as well as coordinating the murder and replacement of Sydney's friend Francie Calfo by Allison Doren, who has been transformed by Project Helix into Francie's genetic duplicate. At the end of the season, Sark is taken into CIA custody.

=== Season 3 ===
Sark becomes the chief financier of The Covenant. The Covenant, during the two-year time when Sydney was undercover as Julia Thorne, sent Sydney to assassinate Andrian Lazarey. Lazarey is Sark's father, and his apparent death causes $800 million in gold bullion to pass to Sark. These funds are seized by the Covenant in exchange for his release from CIA custody and Sark, despite having provided much of the organization's operating capital, feels he is relegated to the status of "foot soldier."

Sark carries out missions for the Covenant, sometimes with the aid of Lauren Reed, a double agent positioned within the NSC and married to Vaughn. One mission he undertakes with Allison Doren. With the apparent destruction of Project Helix, Doren is trapped in Francie's form but Sark, who claims to love her, says it doesn't matter. Doren is killed by Tippin in the course of that mission.

Sark and Reed become lovers and eventually conspire to assassinate the leaders of the six Covenant cells in an attempt to take control of the organization. They manage the assassinations and are congratulated by McKenas Cole, who has become second-in-command of The Covenant. It is at this point that Sark's first name is revealed to be Julian. McKenas Cole appoints Sark and Lauren co-leaders of the North American cell. They ally once again with Arvin Sloane to obtain the Rambaldi equation that Nadia Santos, "The Passenger," channels but are unsuccessful. Reed carries out a mission wearing a mask to impersonate Sydney to obtain the equation from the CIA and plant a bomb in their headquarters, while Sark monitors her remotely. She escapes but he is captured, and Sydney uses a mask and voice changer to impersonate Reed so she can get information from him.

=== Season 4 ===
During his second CIA-imposed imprisonment, Sark is released into the custody of Sydney and Vaughn to help track down terrorist Anna Espinosa. He agrees to help but demands to see proof that Lauren (whom, Allison notwithstanding, Sark also claims is "the woman [he] loved") is in fact dead. After seeing her body in a secret CIA crypt, Sark realizes that it was Vaughn who killed her. During the mission, Espinosa helps Sark escape, and the two briefly collaborate in the selling of a chemical bomb before Sark abandons Anna to Sydney's tender mercies and disappears for the remainder of the season.

=== Season 5 ===
The episode Bob marks Sark's return to the series. With the death of Covenant leader Irina Derevko and the resulting apparent fall of The Covenant, Sark has gone freelance; on this occasion he is working on behalf of a Sudanese warlord to obtain a weapon of mass destruction. New APO recruit Rachel Gibson and he have a tryst while waiting for a transmission that neither knows the other intends to intercept. After Gibson discovers his identity and reports this to APO, Sark is hired by the agency to help recover the weapon, though he ultimately refuses payment after Gibson saves his life. In the episode I See Dead People Sloane sends Sark a secret message, presumably to secure his services to work with Anna Espinosa (in reality, Sydney impersonating Anna, who has been doubled into Sydney and subsequently killed by her). Sark engineers for them to be taken into custody in an Italian prison to secure a Rambaldi amulet from an elderly man known only as "The Rose."

Sark later teams with Sloane and Kelly Peyton to obtain The Horizon, the final Rambaldi artifact Sloane needs to complete his endgame, from Irina in exchange for two missiles. After planting a bomb to destroy APO headquarters (killing Thomas Grace), Sark accompanies Sloane to Mongolia to excavate the tomb of Milo Rambaldi and becomes involved in a stand-off involving Vaughn, Jack Bristow and other of Sloane's operatives. In a gun battle in Rambaldi's tomb, Sark retrieves the Horizon and returns it to Irina in Hong Kong. On Irina's orders, Sark prepares to launch the missiles at Washington, D.C., and London but is captured and shot by Vaughn. He gives Vaughn the codes to abort the launch and Vaughn apparently allows the wounded Sark to depart.

Several years later, Marcus Dixon approaches a semi-retired Sydney and Vaughn and asks for their help with a field assignment. It's revealed that Sark has continued his unbroken track record of survival and is behind the incident Dixon is seeking help with. Sydney jokingly chides Vaughn for allowing Sark to get away years earlier.
