= Francie Calfo =

- Alias character
- Dungey as Francie
- First appearance: "Truth Be Told"; 1x01, September 30, 2001
- Last appearance: "All the Time in the World" (flashback); 5x17, May 22, 2006
- Portrayed by: Merrin Dungey

In-universe information
- Alias: Allison Doren
- Gender: Female
- Occupation: Restaurant owner

Francine "Francie" Calfo is a fictional character on the television series Alias, portrayed by Merrin Dungey from 2001 to 2003 and again in 2006. Initially the best friend of lead character Sydney Bristow (Jennifer Garner), Francie is murdered by a lookalike assassin named Allison Doren, who assumes her identity.

== Character overview ==
As the series begins in the 2001 pilot episode "Truth Be Told", Francie is Sydney Bristow's best friend and roommate. Sydney is a covert agent for a black ops division of the CIA called SD-6, a fact she struggles to hide from her friends. Francie acts as an occasional sounding board and confidante for some of Sydney's personal issues, and eventually decides to open a restaurant. Francie and her friend Will Tippin realize their attraction to each other, and decide to start a relationship.

Sydney, having learned that SD-6 is not a sanctioned CIA division but is in fact a covert cell of a transnational organized crime syndicate, manages to destroy the entire organization in the Season 2 episode "Phase One" (2003). In the same episode, a genetic doppelgänger named Allison Doren kills Francie and assumes her identity. Under orders from Arvin Sloane, Allison bugs Sydney's apartment, hypnotically interrogates Will, plants eavesdropping devices on Michael Vaughn and murders Marcus Dixon's wife. Eventually Will, and then Sydney, realize in the 2003 episode "The Telling" that "Francie" is an impostor, and after a brutal battle Sydney shoots Allison to death. Allison later reappears very much alive in the 2003 episode "The Nemesis", in which she is shot by Sydney and then stabbed to death by Will.

Francie herself appears in a brief flashback in the 2006 series finale "All the Time in the World", in which Sydney is shown to have met her first fiancé, Danny Hecht, through Francie and her boyfriend.

== Development ==
The character was named after Francie Calfo, the real-life vice president of drama development at Touchstone Television who shepherded Alias to series.

With Francie not involved in the "secret agent" plot lines of the series, the character was "pushed to the sidelines" just as Lena Olin was introduced as Sydney's mother Irina Derevko late in Season 1. Clued in by Alias creator and executive producer J. J. Abrams in October 2002 to the "switch" of her character, Dungey and Abrams discussed different ways to facilitate it. Dungey began secretly training with world champion kickboxer Benny "the Jet" Urquidez to prepare for the physicality of her new role. She quipped, "Jennifer [Garner] is a badass ... And if I'm going to have to get in there and tangle with her or any one of her fellow foes on the show, I've got to be ready."

Francie is murdered and Allison is introduced in "Phase One", which aired after Super Bowl XXXVII on January 26, 2003. Following the broadcast, Dungey noted that "Bad Francie" would continue playing the part of Sydney's friend for the purpose of espionage. She noted, "Even though some of the situations seem to be similar — me and Sydney in the house talking — you know Bad Francie is up to no good ... It's sooo good now. It is just delicious every time I get to jump into 'the Francinator.'"

The events of "Phase One" initiated a "reboot" of sorts for the series, with the end of the SD-6 double agent storyline as well as Sydney's need to hide her profession from her friends (Will discovers the truth and Francie is now known to be dead).

Allison-as-Francie was repeatedly referred to as "Bad Francie" or "Evil Francie" by fans and the press.

== Plotlines ==
=== Allison Doren ===
At the end of the second season, Will discovers Allison is not Francie. He attempts to warn Sydney by leaving a frantic voicemail message on her phone, when he is suddenly attacked by Allison, who attempts to strangle him. After failing to kill him, Will corners her with a knife and demands, "It's always been you? Allison?" Allison expresses remorse at what was happening, as she had apparently developed feelings for him during the months she spent posing as Francie. Allison knocks the knife away from Will, takes it, and stabs him with it. She hides Will's body in the bathtub shortly before Sydney arrives home.

Once home, Sydney relaxes on the couch beside Allison, checking her voicemail. She receives Will's message and manages to retain her composure, casually offering Allison ice cream, which Allison accepts. Sydney then excuses herself, hastily making her way to her bedroom to get a weapon, somehow realizing Will was right and "Francie" was a double. Allison appears in the doorway and reveals her mistake, "I just remembered. Francie doesn't like coffee ice cream," to which Sydney replies, "No, she doesn't."

The two engage in a desperate, brutal fight throughout the house during which most of the furniture and possessions are either used as weapons or destroyed. During the fight, Sydney finds Will's body in the bathroom, although she later learns he survived Allison's attack. The fight ends when Sydney manages to shoot Allison three times, once in the arm and twice in the chest.

Despite apparently dying, Allison is recovered by the Covenant and nursed back to health, turning up in the third season. Sydney confronts her in Sofia and shoots her. Allison heals rapidly and escapes from an ambulance transporting her to a hospital. Later, Will finds and confronts her, stabbing and killing her, in exactly the same manner as she had once stabbed him.
