= Rachel Gibson (Alias) =

Fictional television character

- Alias character
- Rachel Nichols as Rachel Gibson
- First appearance: "Prophet Five" (episode 5.01)
- Last appearance: "All the Time in the World" (episode 5.17)
- Portrayed by: Rachel Nichols

In-universe information
- Aliases: Mockingbird; Oracle
- Gender: Female
- Occupation: The Shed analyst APO field agent CIA field agent
- Relatives: Unnamed (mother); Unnamed (father); Nicole Gibson (sister); Eric Gibson (brother)
- Nationality: American

Rachel Gibson is a fictional character played by Rachel Nichols in the final season of the spy-fi television series Alias.

== Character biography ==
Introduced at the start of the fifth season of Alias, Rachel Gibson's life parallels Sydney Bristow's in many ways. A computer genius, she was recruited by Gordon Dean to work for what she thought was a black ops branch of the CIA. In reality, the "Shed" was Dean's own criminal organization. Like with SD-6, all employees but a central handful were told only the cover story- they were an off-book CIA division.

After being captured by Bristow's team on behalf of APO, a genuine black-ops CIA office, Gibson was shown hard evidence the Shed was a criminal organization. She was sent back into the Shed in order to steal information. Dean, however, realized his cover had been blown and set off a bomb, destroying Gibson's office and almost everyone in it, although Gibson herself survived. She was subsequently recruited into APO, which resulted in Gordon Dean ordering her murder. Gibson's family was sent into witness protection to get them away from Dean's vengeance.

Although a novice when it came to field operations, Gibson learned quickly with some help from her colleague Thomas Grace—himself a recent APO recruit. She bonded with Sydney and at one point moved in with her. She also developed up a mutual admiration with APO's computer whiz, Marshall Flinkman. Gibson went on her first solo mission in the episode "Solo" and on a later mission, personally apprehended Gordon Dean (Dean was subsequently killed in custody).

The episode "Solo" strongly suggested Gibson, though she is no stranger to death, had herself never used deadly force up to that point (and continued to avoid doing so). She did, however, later confess to having enjoyed beating Dean senseless with a shovel before his arrest. In the final episode of the series, Gibson shoots a man to death but it is not indicated if this is her first kill.

During the second half of the season (and subsequent to the announcement the fifth season would be the final one), Gibson's character faded into the background somewhat, appearing only briefly in most episodes. Following the birth of Sydney's child, she was no longer living with Sydney (a fact confirmed when Sydney later invites her half-sister Nadia to live with her and Grace later visits Rachel at her apartment), though the series does not indicate when or why she moved out.

In the closing episodes of the series, Gibson found herself attracted to Grace even as she carried out an "off-book" investigation of the agent's activities. She discovered he was investigating the circumstances of his wife's death and she helped him track down her killer, whom Grace assassinated with a car bomb.

In the series finale, Gibson was kidnapped and tortured by Julian Sark (with whom she had had a one-night stand while she was on an undercover mission for APO), and forced to help Arvin Sloane locate a cave he needed to find to achieve his endgame. Along with Marshall, she was able to alert APO to their location and they were rescued. Rachel returned to Los Angeles, only to assist in the evacuation of APO headquarters because of a bomb planted by Sark. She exchanged affectionate final words with Thomas Grace seconds before the bomb exploded, killing him and destroying APO.

Following Grace's death and the massacre by Kelly Peyton of the twelve leaders of Prophet Five, Rachel realized she and her family were no longer in danger. However, she elected to stay with APO and her previous friendship with Peyton proved invaluable in extracting intelligence from her on Sloane's endgame.

In a flash forward to several years in the future, it is revealed Rachel has remained with the CIA, working under Marcus Dixon. She is said to be in a deep undercover operation.
