= Marshall Flinkman =

Fictional character on the television series Alias

- Alias character
- Kevin Weisman as Marshall Flinkman
- First appearance: "Truth Be Told" (episode 1.01)
- Last appearance: "All the Time in the World" (episode 5.17)
- Portrayed by: Kevin Weisman

In-universe information
- Alias: Merlin
- Gender: Male
- Occupation: Head of SD-6 Op Tech; Head of CIA (LA) Op Tech; Head of APO Op Tech
- Spouse: Carrie Bowman
- Children: Mitchell Flinkman (son) three unnamed sons
- Nationality: American

Marshall J. Flinkman is a fictional character on the television series, Alias. Flinkman, portrayed by Kevin Weisman, is the tech geek at SD-6 and then later the CIA. When a field agent is sent on a mission, Marshall serves in a function similar to Q from the James Bond films: as the in-house creator and proprietor of a number of gadgets and sophisticated tools used by field agent. UGO.com named him one of the best TV nerds.

== Characterization ==
Marshall has a quirky and eccentric personality, which contrasts with the stern nature of those around him. He is also socially inept, having a tendency to speak very rapidly, often babbling about tangential subjects in the middle of technical briefings (before someone impatiently brings Marshall back on to the topic at hand). He is always dressed well and wears his hair in a slick sidepart. He has a fondness for unnecessary visual aids when giving a presentation, once even playing a full drum set to make a point (actor Weisman is in a rock band). However, his expertise in almost any subject imaginable is unparalleled, being well-versed in robotics, chemistry, acoustics, electronics, biometrics, explosives, computer networks, and many other subjects. He also has an eidetic memory.

== Storylines ==
Like Sydney, he initially believes SD-6 is a black ops division of the CIA. Because he is not a field agent, he often doctors photographs of himself in exotic locations to fool his mother into thinking he works for a company requiring a lot of travel; he once asked Sydney to take the photographs for said images. When SD-6 is destroyed, Marshall is brought into the CIA for real. Unlike his colleague Marcus Dixon, he adjusts to the change easily and soon becomes a valued member of the team. Starting in the second season, Marshall found a love interest, an NSA agent with similar geekish tendencies, Carrie Bowman. Eventually the two got married and had a child, Mitchell.

During the third season, Marshall experiences great character growth, realizing most people do not understand quantum entanglement, understanding how he appears to others and offering suggestions for operations (which are implemented without comment). At the conclusion of the third season, Marshall is shot and seriously wounded by Lauren Reed. By the start of the fourth season (several months later in the timeframe of the series), he has fully recovered from his injuries and is recruited into the new Authorized Personnel Only (APO) black ops offshoot of the CIA (albeit as a 'late' addition to the organization, when they realized that they needed his computer expertise early in their first assignment).

Marshall serves as comic relief for the Alias series, but he has some serious moments when he is worried about those he cares about, including Sydney, but mostly revolving around Carrie and Mitchell. Marshall has also discovered how hard it is to lie to those he loves, having to keep his job at APO a secret even from his wife (who appears to no longer be working for the NSA by the fourth season).

Marshall rarely works as a field operative, and then only when his expertise in computers is required. This was a key factor in the two-part storyline in the second-season episodes "The Abduction" and "A Higher Echelon", where Marshall accompanied Sydney to hack a classified database on-site and was subsequently abducted by a terrorist cell seeking the same information, requiring Sydney to return him to SD-6 when she had made arrangements for him to be picked up by the CIA and told the truth about Sloane and SD-6 after that mission was over. In the fourth season episode "Tuesday", Marshall is forced to go on a solo mission to rescue Sydney, buried alive somewhere in Cuba, after the rest of APO is incapacitated when a biological agent released by an enemy forces a lockdown of headquarters. Marshall, delayed in arriving at HQ due to a problem with his baby, avoids being caught in the lockdown and becomes the only APO agent able to save Sydney. Later in the mission, when required to make contact with an enemy agent while APO was still on lockdown and the man had already met Sydney, he accidentally shoots and kills the agent while attempting to keep him occupied while Sydney tracks a crucial item in his possession; it is not made clear whether this is the first time Marshall has killed anyone.

The fifth season was largely business as usual for Marshall, although he has also struck up a friendship-cum-mutual admiration society with new APO recruit Rachel Gibson, who had primarily served as a data analyst for current foe Gordon Dean before his true agenda was exposed, although she alternated between taking a field role and acting as Marshall's assistant in the office. The series finale saw Marshall return briefly to the field as part of APO's efforts to capture intel on Prophet Five. He was later kidnapped from his home by Kelly Peyton and tortured, resisting admirably until at Sydney's urging he cooperated as part of a plan to rescue him and the also-abducted Rachel, allowing him to pass on a discreet message that would help his wife Carrie track his online activity and identify his location. Marshall continued to provide tech support as the various members of APO raced around the world to thwart the endgames of Arvin Sloane and Irina Derevko, including remotely inputting the codes to stand down missiles Irina had targeted on Washington, D.C., and London.

In a flash forward at the very end of the final episode, it is revealed Marshall and Carrie have two more children and Carrie is pregnant with their fourth.

== Carrie Bowman ==
Carrie Bowman, played by Amanda Foreman, is an NSA agent and wife of Marshall Flinkman.

Carrie is introduced in Season 2, where she worked at the CIA headquarters in Los Angeles with Marshall. Eventually the two formed a relationship resulting in marriage and the birth of their son, Mitchell. This, of course, happened in typical Marshall fashion. The two decided they were to be wed before the birth of the baby, but Carrie began to go into labor in the middle of an important mission. Marshall quickly enlists Eric Weiss to become legally ordained online (through the "Internet Church of Mammals") so he can marry the two (while Marshall continues to guide Sydney and Vaughn through their mission), bolting at the last second to take his wife to the hospital.

Carrie is strong-willed and tends to get her way in disputes with her husband, and though she tries to keep him in check with her quick wit and sarcasm, they ultimately balance each other out and love one another deeply.

Beginning in the fourth season, Carrie seems to have given up her NSA job to take care of Mitchell. She is unaware Marshall still works for the CIA, since APO is black ops and he is under orders to keep it secret. She only appeared in one fourth season episode ("Tuesday"), and prior to the series finale appeared in one episode during the fifth season ("...1...").

For the series finale, Carrie learned Marshall was still with the CIA when he was kidnapped by agents of Arvin Sloane. She worked with APO to rescue Marshall and the also-abducted Rachel, demonstrating technical prowess rivalling Marshall's, quickly understanding a discreet clue Marshall passed to Sydney that allowed her to track their location from the source of the digital activity.

In the flash forward several years into the future presented at the end of the series finale, it is mentioned Marshall and Carrie have two more children after Mitchell, with another on the way, and all are boys.
