= Alias season 1 =

Alias
- Season 1
- Season 1 DVD cover
- No. of episodes: 22

Release
- Original network: ABC
- Original release: September 30, 2001 – May 12, 2002

Season chronology
- Next → Season 2

The first season of Alias premiered September 30, 2001 on ABC and concluded May 12, 2002 and was released on DVD in region 1 on September 2, 2003. Guest stars in season one include Sir Roger Moore, Terry O'Quinn, Quentin Tarantino, and Gina Torres.

Apart from "Truth Be Told", the episodes of Alias are often unconventionally structured in that the title credits are usually shown well into the plot, almost as an afterthought. Also, usually a plot finishes at mid-episode and a new plot begins, so that every episode finishes with a cliffhanger. The impression thus created is that an episode will conclude the previous one and plant the seeds of the next one.

== Cast and characters ==
=== Main ===
- Jennifer Garner as Sydney Bristow (22 episodes)
- Ron Rifkin as Arvin Sloane (22 episodes)
- Michael Vartan as Michael Vaughn (22 episodes)
- Bradley Cooper as Will Tippin (22 episodes)
- Merrin Dungey as Francie Calfo (20 episodes)
- Carl Lumbly as Marcus Dixon (19 episodes)
- Kevin Weisman as Marshall Flinkman (21 episodes)
- Victor Garber as Jack Bristow (22 episodes)

=== Recurring ===
- Greg Grunberg as Eric Weiss (13 episodes)
- Sarah Shahi as Jenny (7 episodes)
- Evan Parke as Charlie Bernard (6 episodes)
- David Anders as Julian Sark (5 episodes)
- James Handy as CIA Director Ben Devlin (5 episodes)
- Amy Irving as Emily Sloane (5 episodes)
- Joey Slotnick as Steven Haladki (5 episodes)
- Angus Scrimm as Calvin McCullough (4 episodes)
- Elaine Kagan as June Litvack (4 episodes)
- Wolf Muser as Ramon Veloso (3 episodes)
- Derrick O'Connor as Alexander Khasinau (3 episodes)
- Gina Torres as Anna Espinosa (3 episodes)
- Patricia Wettig as Dr. Judy Barnett (3 episodes)
- Quentin Tarantino as McKenas Cole (2 episodes)
- Ric Young as Dr. Zhang Lee (2 episodes)
- Terry O'Quinn as FBI Assistant Director Kendall (1 episode)

== Episodes ==
No. overall	No. in season	Title	Directed by	Written by	Original release date	US viewers (millions)
1	1	"Truth Be Told"	J. J. Abrams	J. J. Abrams	September 30, 2001	15.05
SD-6, allegedly a CIA black ops division, recruits L.A. university student Sydney Bristow. Her boyfriend, pediatric cardiologist Danny Hecht (Note: Edward Atterton as Dr. Danny Hecht) proposes marriage, prompting Sydney to reveal her clandestine occupation. Arvin Sloane orders Danny's assassination to protect SD-6. Devastated, Sydney takes a protracted leave of absence. Agent Marcus Dixon urges her to return, in vain. Sydney evades a hit squad, aided by her estranged father Jack Bristow. He reveals SD-6 is really a criminal division of the Alliance of Twelve, which steals intelligence, weapons, etc. Only selected leaders know their true agenda, exploiting Agents' patriotism. Sydney is sickened that Jack lied, and was complicit in allowing her to become Sloan's pawn. Realizing Sloane no longer trusts her, Sydney devises a plan to regain her SD-6 standing. In Taipei, she retrieves a prototype "circumference" artifact designed by the mysterious 15th century inventor Milo Rambaldi. Confronting Sloane with the coveted device, Sydney promises allegiance to SD-6. With trust restored, she presents herself as a "walk-in" at CIA HQ, Langley to report SD-6's illicit activities. Volunteering to become a double agent, she meets Michael Vaughn and Eric Weiss. At Danny's grave. Jack reveals he's not a traitor, but a double agent trying to end SD-6.
2	2	"So It Begins"	Ken Olin	J. J. Abrams	October 7, 2001	10.74
Sydney offers a plan to Vaughn to destroy SD-6 in a matter of months only to be shocked to learn the grand scope of the work ahead of her. Sydney returns to SD-6 as a double agent and is assigned with Marcus Dixon to travel to Moscow to retrieve some stolen files. In the process, however, she inadvertently gives SD-6 access to a nuclear weapon, which makes her travel to Cairo and face a deadly foe in order to fix things. Meanwhile, Will Tippin (a journalist and a close friend) driven by pity and a secret devotion for her, begins to question the circumstances surrounding Danny's death. He discovers weird details about the night of the murder, one being that someone had tried to help him escape by booking him a flight to Singapore. Sydney, who still can't come to terms with her father's insincerity, reconciles with him to a certain extent when she discovers he was the one who bought plane tickets for Daniel and her.
3	3	"Parity"	Mikael Salomon	Alex Kurtzman & Roberto Orci	October 14, 2001	11.34
Sydney's life is in danger as she is sent to Madrid to retrieve a 500-year-old sketch that contains a set of binary digits on its reverse, having to do with the Rambaldi artifact Sydney brought back from Taipei. SD-6 needs the sketch to decipher the key to its workings. Meanwhile, Will Tippin continues his research into the cause of Danny's death and discovers a strange anomaly concerning surveillance cameras in the zone of Danny's apartment the night he was murdered. Will is not aware of the danger he is placing himself in by doing this, but Sydney tries to make him stop. In Madrid, Sydney meets up with her deadly nemesis, K-Directorate agent Anna Espinosa, (Note: Gina Torres as Anna Espinosa) and a fight ensues to retrieve the sketch. It ends up at a draw, as Anna keeps the key to a small suitcase Sydney has obtained. In the end they have to make an arrangement to open the suitcase together, which has the two of them looking inside the suitcase in astonishment at something that remains unrevealed.
4	4	"A Broken Heart"	Harry Winer	Vanessa Taylor	October 21, 2001	10.76
Sydney and Dixon go on a dangerous mission to Morocco involving the safety of the United Commerce Organization, and an agent friend of Sydney's dies of a gunshot. Meanwhile, Sydney's close friend and roommate Francie Calfo confronts her boyfriend Charlie Bernard about a secret date with another woman. Sydney's friendship with Francie, Charlie and Will is strained by her lying about all the sudden trips she takes for Credit Dauphine, her cover-job. Will continues his investigation to find the truth about the murder of Daniel Hecht and unravels more of the mystery. Back from Morocco, Sydney tries to get to know her father better by inviting him to dinner. However, he doesn't dare turn up, which makes her miserable.
5	5	"Doppelgänger"	Ken Olin	Daniel Arkin	October 28, 2001	10.03
Sydney's secret double agent status is jeopardized after she smuggles a biotech engineer into SD-6 from her mission in Berlin. Will meets a woman named Kate Jones who confesses that she was having an affair with Danny shortly before his death. Vaughn informs Sydney that her father may be working for a third secret operative agency, the FBI, as he begins to feel increasingly attracted to her. CIA Agent Burnett (Note: Kevin Mitnick as CIA Agent Burnett) plants a computer worm into the SD-6 mainframe to track their progress and obtain inside intelligence.
6	6	"Reckoning"	Dan Attias	Jesse Alexander	November 18, 2001	9.21
Sydney discovers her mother Laura Bristow's accidental vehicular death, twenty years ago, resulted from Jack trying to escape the FBI investigating him as a KGB double agent. Sydney goes undercover in a Bucharest mental institution to get information from Shepard, a man who had been unconsciously programmed to become a deadly assassin. Meanwhile, Will discovers the true identity of Kate Jones (Eloise Kurtz), the woman who claimed to have had an affair with Danny. Francie is relieved to learn that Charlie is not having an affair, but rather trying to become a singer songwriter, and that the woman is his piano player. SD-6 Chief Technician Marshall Flinkman finds the computer worm planted in the SD-6 mainframe by the CIA and tells Sloane, who congratulates Marshall for passing a special Security Division test. Suspecting an SD-6 mole, Sloane sets out to determine who it is. Sydney's cover is blown when the asylum leader is revealed as a K-Directorate agent trying to uncover from Shepard the same information SD-6 wants.
7	7	"Color Blind"	Jack Bender	Roberto Orci & Alex Kurtzman	November 25, 2001	9.65
After helping Shepard escape from the asylum in Bucharest Sydney discovers the shocking connection he has with her past. He was brainwashed by SD-6 and programmed to kill her fiancé, among others. Sloane is confronted by Alliance representative Alain Christophe after the computer worm affair blows up, whom suggests that one or more moles may have infiltrated SD-6. Will Tippin continues to investigate the Eloise Kurtz (alias Kate Jones), who now claims to have been Danny's mistress. He makes an appointment with her, but when he goes to her place it has been emptied and repainted and she is gone. Later, she's found dead in Echo Park. Sydney, in the meantime, understands that Shepard is not really responsible for Danny's murder but he's been used by the SD-6 very much like herself. She lets him go and tells SD-6 that he went totally insane and committed suicide jumping from a bridge near the frontier with Bucharest. Upon her return to Los Angeles, she learns the truth about her father's involvement in her mother's death 20 years earlier. It was his fault because he was fleeing from another car when they had the accident. But Syd also learns for sure that he was not involved with the KGB. He tells her that during the Cold War everybody was suspicious of illegal activities, so he was investigated as a routine process.
8	8	"Time Will Tell"	Perry Lang	Jeff Pinkner	December 2, 2001	11.12
Sydney must undergo an extensive lie detector test to satisfy Sloane's frantic search for the SD-6 mole. With nemesis Anna Espinosa following her every move, Sydney is told to find out the truth about the connection that a clock made by one Giovanni Donato for Rambaldi in the 16th century may have to the 500-year-old prophetic Rambaldi sketch with the binary digits on the back. The mystery of Kate Jones deepens as Will continues to investigate Danny's death when he finds a piece of jewelry in her abandoned car that works as a microphone to contact someone else. Sydney accidentally discovers that some books her father gave her mother as a present have 5-character rows of Cyrillic letters imprinted at the margins, which seems to prove that he indeed had some kind of connection with the KGB.
9	9	"Mea Culpa"	Ken Olin	Debra J. Fisher & Erica Messer	December 9, 2001	10.01
Sydney's life is placed in mortal danger when Sloane is informed by his superior that she is the SD-6 mole. Meanwhile, Dixon's life hangs in the balance after he is shot by Anna Espinosa on a mission, trying to recover a Rambaldi manuscript hidden in the mountains of South America. Will realizes that his discovery of Kate Jones' pin could uncover some unexpected information.
10	10	"Spirit"	Jack Bender	J. J. Abrams & Vanessa Taylor	December 16, 2001	9.99
Sydney briefs her CIA handler, Vaughn, on her recent captivity at SD-6 and is surprised when he unexpectedly gives her a Christmas gift. Their relationship remains halted because they both know that they can't endanger her position by going out in the open about it, but Sydney also seems to like him more than she would admit. Meanwhile Jack has to find a way to save Sydney when he discovers that Sloane has been convinced she's the mole and has given orders to torture and kill her. Will may be making the mistake of his life when he begins to research a name heard on a mysterious audio cassette – SD-6.
11	11	"The Confession"	Harry Winer	J. J. Abrams & Daniel Arkin	January 6, 2002	10.70
Sydney is grateful and proud of her father after he saves her life while on a case in Havana but her admiration is short lived when Vaughn discovers further evidence that Jack may have been responsible for the deaths of over a dozen CIA officers 25 years earlier, one of them his own father. After thinking it over carefully, Sydney decides to speak against her father in front of senior CIA agents. But she is surprised to see him at the meeting, where he himself tells her that yes, he was involved but he was not the assassin. She's shocked to learn that Laura Bristow, her mother, was in fact one Irina Derevko, undercover agent for the KGB, who infiltrated the US to obtain intelligence and murder key agents.
12	12	"The Box (Part 1)"	Jack Bender	Jesse Alexander & John Eisendrath	January 20, 2002	9.38
When armed intruders take over SD-6 led by McKenas Cole, (Note: Quentin Tarantino as McKenas Cole) a man bent on exacting revenge on ex-boss Sloane, Sydney and Jack must work together to save their "colleagues". Meanwhile, Will Tippin fears that his investigation of SD-6 and its link to the murder of Eloise Kurtz (alias Kate Jones) is placing his life in serious jeopardy.
13	13	"The Box (Part 2)"	Jack Bender	Jesse Alexander & John Eisendrath	February 10, 2002	9.85
Vaughn disobeys orders and attempts to help Sydney and Jack avert the destruction of SD-6 headquarters and all its occupants. Meanwhile, McKenas Cole continues his vendetta against Sloane searching for a mysterious device. The daughter of David McNeil, a convict condemned to life for an affair having to do with SD-6, convinces Will to continue his investigation and help her imprisoned father. Vaughn helps Sydney out of SD-6 and they recover what Cole was there to get, a mysterious vial of liquid with the inscription <O>, a recurring symbol found in Rambaldi's inventions and manuscripts.
14	14	"The Coup"	Thomas J. Wright	Alex Kurtzman & Roberto Orci	February 24, 2002	8.83
Sydney and Dixon are sent to Las Vegas to gather information from a K-Directorate agent who has ties to the group that attacked and nearly destroyed SD-6. Meanwhile, Sydney accidentally discovers some shocking news about Francie's fiancé, Charlie, who recently had had a real affair with another woman. Will begins his journey to discover what SD-6 really is, and Jack continues to try to be more of a father to Sydney when he helps her decide whether or not to continue with graduate school.
15	15	"Page 47"	Ken Olin	J. J. Abrams & Jeff Pinkner	March 3, 2002	10.36
Vaughn asks Sydney to use her friendship with Sloane's wife, Emily, to gain access to the Rambaldi manuscript Anna Espinosa took from her, and which happens to be under lock and key in a safe at Sloane's home. Will is kidnapped and told to drop his investigation of SD-6 or risk the lives of his family and friends, including Sydney's.
16	16	"The Prophecy"	Davis Guggenheim	John Eisendrath	March 10, 2002	8.39
"This woman here depicted will possess unseen marks, signs that she will be the one to bring forth my works. Bind them with fury. A burning anger unless prevented. At vulgar cost, this woman will render the greatest power unto utter desolation." – Milo Rambaldi, The Prophecy (excerpt) Sydney is tested by the Department of Special Research to discover her mysterious link to a chilling 500-year-old picture and prophecy foretold in the Rambaldi manuscript. A drawing of a woman who bears an eerie resemblance to her appears in a blank page of the manuscript thanks to the revealing substance in the vial that McKenas Cole had tried to steal from SD-6. Meanwhile, after uncovering the identity of the rogue group leader, "The Man," Sloane learns through fellow Alliance of Twelve member Edward Poole (Note: Roger Moore as Edward Poole) that a close friend may be working with the enemy.
17	17	"Q & A"	Ken Olin	J. J. Abrams	March 17, 2002	10.74
While the FBI detains and questions Sydney about her past and possible ties to the mysterious Rambaldi doomsday prophecy, Vaughn and Jack must race to free her and find a way to clear her name before her cover is blown and SD-6 is made aware of the situation. Once the rescue op has been launched, in her quest to prove her innocence, Sydney shocks even her usually unflappable father when she makes a chilling discovery that may unravel the mystery of the 500-year-old prophecy—she finds proof that Rambaldi's writings may hold more truth about an alleged weapon of mass destruction—and the fate of her own family. Note: First appearance of Terry O'Quinn as FBI Assistant Director Kendall.
18	18	"Masquerade"	Craig Zisk	Alex Kurtzman & Roberto Orci	April 7, 2002	10.53
While on a case to track the activities of Khasinau, also known as "The Man," Sydney runs into ex-lover Noah Hicks, (Note: Peter Berg as Noah Hicks) who broke her heart and left without saying goodbye five years earlier. Meanwhile, Sydney tells Sloane that she wants to find her mother; Jack is ordered to see CIA psychiatrist Dr. Barnett to help him deal with his churning emotions after discovering that his wife may still be alive; and Will and Francie become suspicious of Sydney's activities after finding one of her airline ticket stubs.
19	19	"Snowman"	Barnet Kellman	Jesse Alexander & Jeff Pinkner	April 14, 2002	7.80
Sloane begins to question where Noah's true allegiances lie, as passion ignites between Sydney and Noah. Meanwhile, Sydney continues to uncover new information about her mother, which disturbs Jack. A rogue assassin known as the Snowman is dispatched by K-Directorate to kill Calder. Will and Francie confront Sydney about the mysterious airline ticket stub found in her jacket.
20	20	"The Solution"	Dan Attias	John Eisendrath	April 21, 2002	8.90
In order to catch Khasinau and get closer to finding her mother, Sydney and Vaughn set up an undercover transaction for a Rambaldi artifact with Khasinau's representative, Mr. Sark. But Sydney's cover may be compromised when her partner, SD-6 agent Marcus Dixon is sent in to thwart the sale. Meanwhile, Will is enticed to continue his investigation of SD-6 when he learns the identity of one of his kidnappers. Emily tells Sydney that she knows about SD-6, which forces Sloane to make the most difficult decision of his life.
21	21	"Rendezvous"	Ken Olin	Debra J. Fisher & Erica Messer	May 5, 2002	8.08
Will's life is about to change as he is sent to find the person responsible for leaking information to him about SD-6 - he finally finds out about Sydney's alias. Meanwhile, Sloane finds himself on the cusp of finally tracking down Khasinau when SD-6 captures "The Man's" right-hand man, Sark. Dixon becomes suspicious of Sydney's activities.
22	22	"Almost Thirty Years"	J. J. Abrams	J. J. Abrams	May 12, 2002	11.25
In order to save Will's life, Sydney and Vaughn must destroy a familiar looking Rambaldi device, while Jack makes a risky deal with Khasinau's representative, Mr. Sark. Meanwhile, the CIA believes that one of their own is a mole for "The Man"; the Alliance comes to a decision regarding the fate of Emily Sloane; Dixon's suspicions about Sydney intensify; and Sydney finds herself face-to-face with "The Man."

== Reception ==
Entertainment Weekly put the pilot episode on its end-of-the-decade, "best-of" list, saying, "Fiery red hair. Weird red ball. Black ops. White knuckles. Our 2001 introduction to Jennifer Garner's Sydney Bristow--the grad-student/fakebanker/double-agent superspy at the rapidly beating heart of this intricate action serial--was mesmerizingly colorful."

== Home release ==
The 6-DVD box set of Season 1 was released in region 1 format (US) on September 2, 2003, in region 2 format (UK) on September 29, 2003 and in region 4 format (AU) on November 4, 2003. The DVDs contain all episodes of Season 1, plus the following features:

- Audio commentaries on select episodes
- Deleted Scenes
- Pilot production diary
- Featurette: A Mission Around the World
- Marshall Flinkman's Gadget Gallery
- Auditions
- Season Two Preview
- Season Three Preview
- PS2 game sneak peek
- Gag reel
