= Sydney Bristow =

Fictional character in the television series Alias

- Alias character
- Jennifer Garner as Sydney Bristow
- First appearance: "Truth Be Told" (episode 1.01)
- Last appearance: "All the Time in the World" (episode 5.17)
- Portrayed by: Jennifer Garner

In-universe information
- Aliases: Kate Jones; Joanna Kelly; Julia Thorne; Bluebird; Freelancer; Mountaineer; Phoenix; Amy Tippin; Anna Espinosa
- Gender: Female
- Title: Agent Sydney Bristow
- Occupation: SD-6 field agent CIA field agent The Covenant assassin (DSR double agent); APO field agent
- Spouse: Michael Vaughn (husband)
- Significant others: Danny Hecht (ex-fiancé, deceased); Noah Hicks (ex-boyfriend, deceased); Simon Walker (lover, deceased)
- Children: Isabelle Vaughn (daughter); Jack Vaughn (son)
- Relatives: Jack Bristow (father, deceased); Irina Derevko (mother, deceased); Elena Derevko (aunt, deceased); Katya Derevko (aunt, status unknown); Nadia Santos (maternal half-sister, deceased)
- Nationality: American

Sydney Anne Bristow (played by Jennifer Garner) is a fictional character and the protagonist of the television series Alias. She is an American woman with a Russian-Canadian family background who thought she was working as a spy for the CIA when, in fact, she was one of the operatives working for a criminal organization known as SD-6 — one of the arms of the terrorist group The Alliance of Twelve. Eventually, Sydney learns the truth about her employers and becomes herself a spy for the CIA.

Sydney is depicted in the series as being strong both physically and emotionally. She deals with some significant trauma over the years: the death of her fiancé, the death of her best friend, the realization that her mother was a former KGB spy, the estrangement of many of her friends and the constant activity and changes that she must endure from being a spy on a regular basis. Sydney is highly skilled in Krav Maga and is a hyper polyglot, speaking English, Russian, German, Greek, Dutch, French, Italian, Spanish, Portuguese, Norwegian, Swedish, Romanian, Hungarian, Hebrew, Uzbek, Arabic, Persian, Urdu, Indonesian, Cantonese, Mandarin, Japanese, Korean, Hindi, Vietnamese, Polish, Serbian, Czech, Ukrainian, and Bulgarian in various episodes. Throughout the series her code names are Bluebird, Freelancer, Mountaineer, and Phoenix.

== Character biography ==
Sydney Bristow was born April 17, 1975. For the first six years of her life she lived with both of her parents, Jonathan (a.k.a. Jack) and Laura Bristow (real name Irina Derevko). However, her father's work with the CIA kept him away from home much of the time. Sydney and her family were living in rural Maryland until Jack was transferred to Los Angeles when Sydney was two. In 1981 her mother, who was also an undercover agent for the KGB, faked her own death to prevent being apprehended by the FBI. Afterwards Jack was taken into custody for some time, because it was believed that he also was part of a larger conspiracy.

Jack named Arvin Sloane as Sydney's temporary guardian and Sydney went to live with Sloane and his wife Emily, for a time (Note that this is a retcon as it was previously established that Sydney did not meet Arvin or Emily until Sydney had already started working for SD-6. Sydney herself had stated that she had large memory gaps from around the time of her mother's death and can only remember that her father began drinking heavily and became more of an absentee father, leaving Sydney to be raised by nannies. Later it is revealed that the memory gaps are due to Jack, who after finally having been cleared, tested Project Christmas on Sydney, so that she would never be recruited by the KGB, and like all the candidates tested, the training ended with Sydney's memory erased).

When Sydney was 19 years old and a freshman in college, a man approached her and told her that he worked with US intelligence and that they wanted to interview her because she fit a profile. She declined at first but then decided to join them. After meeting with an organization she believed was the Central Intelligence Agency, she signed "dozens of non-disclosure agreements" and was offered a job.

They had Sydney take a job as an office assistant on the twentieth floor of Credit Dauphine, a corporate bank in downtown Los Angeles. She assumed that the bank was somehow affiliated with the CIA. When she told her father about her job after about a month, he ordered her to quit because as a double agent within SD-6, he knew the bank was a front. Sydney angrily refused to quit and this led to the beginning of a several-year estrangement in their relationship.

Eventually she was told that she was ready for the transition, which involved eight months of training. It was during the training that Sydney first heard the term SD-6. At this time, she believed that SD-6 was affiliated with the CIA, that it was a black ops division of the CIA, funded by the CIA's black budget. They led her to believe that SD-6 was one of these divisions and that that was why they did not operate through Langley, Virginia.

The transition ended when they made reference to SD-6 headquarters. They told her they would take her there. What she did not realize was that the headquarters were in the same building. Her role within SD-6 was desk work, at first, but she advanced quickly. Within the first year, she was assigned to reconnaissance missions.

Sydney was told that the objective of SD-6 was "the retrieval and study of intelligence, both military and industrial, throughout the world that is critical to the superiority and survival of the United States of America."

Seven years after joining SD-6, Sydney discovered that SD-6 was actually a branch of the Alliance of Twelve, an international organized crime group involved in the trade of intelligence and weapons, and was an enemy of the United States.

== Storylines ==
=== Season 1 ===
Sydney was engaged to be married to her boyfriend Danny Hecht, but he was killed by SD-6 after Sydney told him that she worked for the CIA. Shortly thereafter, she was informed of what SD-6 was by her mostly estranged father, who worked in the highest levels of SD-6.

Sydney went to the real CIA with her knowledge of SD-6, and was recruited by the CIA into working as a double agent to bring down SD-6. Her handler, Agent Michael Vaughn, and who is her ongoing love interest on the show, gives her missions from the CIA. She soon learns that her own father is a double agent as well. During her time at SD-6, Sydney performed missions with Marcus Dixon, who sometimes became suspicious that Sydney was a double agent. Dixon was still under the impression that SD-6 was part of the U.S. Government. Sydney had to balance all these new revelations with keeping all these secrets from her friends, notably Will Tippin and Francie Calfo.

During this season, the head of SD-6, Arvin Sloane, was obsessed with Milo Rambaldi, a man from the 15th century who was able to create brilliant devices that were far ahead of their time. Sydney worked on a number of missions to retrieve or modify these Rambaldi devices to prevent them from falling into the hands of SD-6. During the season finale, on one such mission to destroy such a device, Sydney is captured and discovers that the organization that SD-6 has been pursuing is being run by Irina Derevko, Sydney's mother and a former KGB spy.

=== Season 2 ===
During season 2, Sydney continues to act as a double agent inside SD-6 and also performs direct missions for the CIA. Irina Derevko turns herself in to the CIA and provides valuable information to help bring down SD-6. Midway through the season, the CIA finally has enough information to bring down the entire Alliance organization and the assault on SD-6 headquarters, led by Sydney and Vaughn. The organization comes tumbling down, but Sloane gets away and is now working covertly with Julian Sark.

Following the fall of SD-6, Sydney decides she wants to leave the CIA but finds herself unable to do so knowing that Sloane is still free. Sydney also has to work to make amends with Dixon, who is bitter that Sydney knew SD-6 was not part of the U.S. Government and didn't tell him, although they are eventually able to patch things up and Dixon begins to work with the CIA.

During this time, Sydney's friend and roommate Francie has secretly been assassinated and replaced by an agent of Sloane and Sark's, Allison Doren. Sydney eventually figures out that "Francie" is not who she says she is and the two engage in a battle which destroys the entire apartment. Sydney shoots Allison three times, apparently killing her, but Sydney is also severely wounded and passes out.

When Sydney wakes up, she is in Hong Kong and comes to find out that two years have passed without her knowledge.

Season 2 saw a fundamental change in Sydney's character, allegedly introduced in order to give the show more action. In the first season, Sydney almost never kills, preferring fisticuffs and tranquilizer guns to deadly blows and real bullets. Starting this season, she behaves more like a stereotypical spy, usually killing enemies and rarely using tranq guns. Although there were some minor incidents prior, the episode "Phase One" is generally considered to mark the arrival of this new version of Sydney. While some fans have criticized this change in Sydney's character, others have suggested that it might have been influenced by the arrival of her mother. During season 2 Sydney also begins to dress and act more sexually to achieve her goals.

=== Season 3 ===
Sydney now has to deal with the pain of not knowing what has happened for the previous two years of her life, but also the fact that Vaughn is now married to another woman, National Security Council liaison Lauren Reed. Sydney tries to manipulate the CIA to stay in the loop of the organization (they don't trust her because of her absence).

Sydney learns that an organization known as The Covenant seems to be involved with her disappearance. In the meantime, Sydney continues to perform missions for the CIA, while working with her father to find out more about her past.

Eventually Sydney learns through FBI Assistant Director Kendall (who is actually the director of the Department of Special Research) that she worked in the employ of the Covenant as a supposedly brainwashed assassin, although she was able to resist their attempts to manipulate her due to her experiences with Project Christmas and report to the CIA during this time. Eventually, she wiped her own memories to conceal information and perhaps also because of the horrifying realization that the Covenant had extracted her eggs in order to fulfill one of Rambaldi's prophecies. She was also greatly disturbed that she chose to kill an unarmed man in cold blood rather than risk losing her cover as a brainwashed assassin.

Sydney and Vaughn continue to suppress their feelings for each other in light of Vaughn's relationship with Lauren. However, it is discovered that Lauren is actually an agent working for the Covenant, although both Sydney and Vaughn are, at first, unaware of this fact.

The CIA learns that there is a mole in the Los Angeles office. Jack is assigned to find the mole and soon starts to suspect Lauren. Jack confronts Lauren's father, Senator Reed, but he dismisses it.

Meanwhile Vaughn decides to separate from Lauren. Lauren tells Sark and Sark explains that the last time Vaughn strayed from a relationship because of Sydney he quickly reconnected when his then-girlfriend Alice Williams' father died. Sark orders Lauren to kill her father. Lauren cannot go through with it but her mother bursts in and finishes the job. They frame Senator Reed for being the mole. Vaughn quickly recommits to Lauren, breaking Sydney's heart.

On a mission to meet a Covenant asset, Sydney sees Lauren. When she tells Vaughn he dismisses it. Sydney talks to Jack and then Jack talks to Vaughn telling him the signs that his wife is betraying him. When Vaughn becomes suspicious he looks in Lauren's suitcase and discovers evidence that she does work for the Covenant.

Vaughn tells Jack and Sydney and he is ordered by Dixon to pretend that he is unaware of Lauren's betrayal. Lauren soon finds out that she has been played by Vaughn and she and Sark kidnap him. After torturing him and failing to get any information they leave him for dead. Weiss finds Vaughn and he is taken to the hospital.

Sydney soon discovers that the Passenger is Nadia Santos, her half-sister by the way of an affair between Irina and Sloane. After a rescue mission, Sydney's sister is taken by Sloane so he can get the formula that was stored in her brain by Rambaldi (actually her unique nervous system can replay the graphical hand movements encoded in the Rambaldi Fluid-protein strands that cause unconscious, movements like handwriting). Sydney rescues her again, but Nadia later elects to accompany Sloane in search of the Rambaldi artifact known as The Sphere of Life.

Lauren enters the CIA office disguised as Sydney and steals information. Sark is captured and interviewed by Vaughn. Sark gives up Lauren and Vaughn resolves to kill her. Vaughn tracks her down and brings her to an empty warehouse. As Lauren dangles from the ceiling, Vaughn states that he loves Sydney more than he hates Lauren thus he will not kill Lauren. He does, however, plan to douse her in hydrochloric acid, rendering her unrecognizable. Sydney's aunt, the ambiguous Katya Derevko, stabs him in the back. When Sydney learns about Vaughn, she goes after Lauren herself. Vaughn goes after her and arrives just in time to save Sydney from Lauren. As Vaughn and Sydney kiss, Lauren tries to make one last shot. Vaughn sees this and shoots her dead. Before Lauren dies she tells Sydney that there is a safe deposit box in Wittenburg that has information about her.

Sydney goes to the box and finds secret CIA documents about her. Jack gets there and tells her that she was never supposed to find them.

=== Season 4 ===
Several months after her discovery, Sydney is once again estranged from her father, having discovered (through the secret documents) that he had killed Irina Derevko. Following a botched mission in Shanghai, she receives a dressing down at a performance review, is demoted, and is subsequently dismissed from the CIA.

In truth, Sydney has been recruited into APO (Authorized Personnel Only), a new black ops division of the CIA patterned after SD-6. Much to her dismay, this new agency is headed by Sloane, who oversees a handpicked team which includes Sydney, Jack Bristow, Vaughn, and Dixon. During APO's first mission, Marshall is also recruited, as is her half-sister, Nadia. Her former colleague, Eric Weiss, thinks that Sydney is working for a bank - the same cover she had used when working for SD-6.

During the course of APO's first mission, to bring down a terrorist and assassin-for-hire, she learns the man was actually hired to kill her - by Irina. Jack subsequently killed Irina to protect his daughter. Meanwhile, Sydney rekindles her romance with Vaughn. Later, it is revealed that Irina is not actually dead - Jack killed a genetic double in an elaborate deception orchestrated by Irina's evil sister, Elena, who recruits Sloane in activating a huge Mueller device invented by Rambaldi, which has the potential to destroy the world. Irina is rescued from Elena's clutches and reunited with her family - including Nadia, who she hasn't seen for years - and together they fly to Russia to stop Elena's plans.

Around this time, after some twists and turns and ups and downs in their relationship, Vaughn finally proposes marriage prior to the mission to go after Elena. Sydney doesn't answer just yet. Finally, when she is about to destroy the Mueller device, Sydney goes back to Vaughn and gives him an affirmative reply.

During the mission in Russia, it is revealed that Sloane was able to infiltrate the drinking water of the city through his charity, and all who had drunk this water and were exposed to the Mueller device were genetically altered and became excessively violent. When Nadia is captured by Elena, she is injected with the infected water and consequently attempts to kill Sydney.

The season ends on a cliffhanger when Vaughn reveals to Sydney that his real name is not Michael Vaughn, and depending on who is asked, he might be a "bad guy". At that moment, their car is T-boned by an unknown assailant.

=== Season 5 ===
Sydney and Vaughn survive the car crash, but Vaughn is taken by their assailants. He manages to escape and tells Sydney that his real name is André Michaux. He also tells her that he's been working for several years to uncover the activities of a mysterious organization known as Prophet Five. His father before him had also worked to gather intel on Prophet Five. Shortly thereafter, Sydney learns she is pregnant and Vaughn is shot and apparently killed by a rogue agent posing as a CIA officer. Four months later, Sydney makes contact with Renée Rienne, an assassin on the CIA's most wanted list, who had been working with Vaughn, and whose father had worked with Vaughn's father, to bring down Prophet Five.

Sydney finds a kindred spirit in Rachel Gibson, a young, wide-eyed, inexperienced agent rescued from "The Shed", a covert criminal organization that, much like SD-6, operates under the alias of a CIA black-ops division. Gibson, like Sydney years earlier, had been duped into believing she was working for the CIA. Now a member of APO, Gibson is learning the ways of being a field agent, with Sydney her designated handler, just as Michael had worked with her. With Nadia still comatose in the hospital, Gibson has moved into Sydney's home.

Sydney has also put at least some demons of the past behind her. Now fully reconciled with her father, she has also expressed some forgiveness of Sloane, to the point of writing a letter of recommendation for Sloane's release hearing.

Sydney continues to go on missions when her condition allows, often using the pregnancy as part of her disguises. However, in the episode "Solo", she came to realize that these days might be fast coming to a (temporary) end when she is not allowed to go on a mission due to her condition.

Three weeks before her due date, Sydney is captured by Prophet Five in order to force her (via a form of drug-induced hypnosis) to remember details of a giant SD-6 flowchart that she had been shown by Michael Vaughn during one of their first meetings. Encouraged by her mental recreation of Michael Vaughn, she is able to resist the hypnosis and provide false information to her kidnappers (who, unbeknownst to Sydney, include Irina). Sydney discovers that she has been stranded aboard a freighter at sea where she attempts to elude Prophet Five and one of their associates, Kelly Peyton. During this incident, she discovers that her family doctor is actually a Prophet Five agent, and suffers a complication with her pregnancy that (to her later surprise) is corrected by Prophet Five and the baby is saved.

After being extracted by APO, Sydney is reunited with her mother and together with her and Jack they travel to Vancouver in order to obtain a mysterious object called "The Horizon" which Prophet Five believed Sydney possessed. During this mission, which is complicated by the discovery that Irina works for Prophet Five and a subsequent attack by Peyton, Sydney goes into labor and — with the aid of Irina and Jack — gives birth to a baby girl, named Isabelle. Irina subsequently disappears with The Horizon.

After the birth of Isabelle, it is revealed that Vaughn didn't die. After his shooting, Jack helped him fake his death and hide in Bhutan.

About a month after giving birth, Sydney returns to duty when Anna Espinosa is recruited by Peyton to kidnap Will Tippin. Espinosa implants an explosive in Tippin's head and demands that page 47 of Rambaldi's manuscript be turned over to her in return for the disarming code. Sydney and Will battle Anna but lose page 47, and in the process Anna uses an unknown chemical agent to collect genetic material from Sydney. Anna goes through the genetic doubling process and becomes Sydney's duplicate.

After Anna kills Renée Rienne while she is on a mission with APO, a chip bearing Michael Vaughn's real name (André Michaux) is discovered implanted in her body. The chip bears what appears to be a corrupted code. Sydney heads to Nepal to meet with Vaughn but is intercepted by an agent of Prophet Five while Anna keeps Sydney's rendezvous with Vaughn. Anna and Vaughn discover that Vaughn has the other half of the code on a chip implanted in his body and after deciphering the code he and Anna head to Germany. They discover a bunker containing all of Vaughn's father's research on Prophet Five. Vaughn reveals that he knows Anna is not Sydney and they fight. Anna gains the upper hand until Sydney shoots her in the head, killing her. Sydney goes undercover as Anna to infiltrate Prophet Five and meets up with Peyton.

Sydney, still undercover as Anna, meets Sloane and learns that she is to seek a rose from an ancient Italian monastery. She meets up with Julian Sark in Italy and he gets them arrested to infiltrate the prison that stands where the monastery once did. Sydney discovers an elderly man who identifies himself as The Rose. The Rose gives Sydney an amulet and tells her she can't stop Prophet Five from carrying out its plans. While Peyton extracts Sark from the prison, Sloane attempts to kill Sydney, still believing she is Anna. Sydney survives the attempt but Sloane escapes with the amulet. Sydney and Vaughn return to Los Angeles, where Vaughn meets his daughter for the first time. Their happiness is short-lived, however, as Sydney gets a call from Sloane, who has figured out that she is still alive.

Sydney finally travels to Sydney, Australia as part of an APO mission to get intel on the twelve leaders of Prophet Five. She successfully captures intel on three of the twelve and returns to Los Angeles.

Shortly thereafter, Marshall and Rachel are abducted by Peyton and Sark respectively and Sydney encounters Sloane, who convinces her to get Marshall to help him locate a certain cavern. Marshall is able to pass a message to Sydney, who, working with Marshall's wife Carrie, is able to locate Marshall and Rachel and mount a rescue. Marshall and Rachel advise the team that Sloane is seeking a cave in Italy and Sydney deduces that Sloane is headed for Mount Subasio. She and Vaughn travel there and Sydney descends into the cave. There she encounters Sloane again, with the amulet she recovered earlier. Sloane fires several rounds into the floor of the cave at Sydney's feet, causing the floor to give way. Vaughn rescues Sydney and performs CPR on her.

The team next tracks Sloane to Mongolia and the tomb of Milo Rambaldi. There Sydney encounters Sloane yet again as he implements his endgame by placing the Horizon on an altar, thus creating a red, hovering ball-shaped fluid similar to that created by the Mueller device. Sydney disrupts Sloane's plans by grabbing the Horizon from the altar, causing the ball to collapse in a torrent of red liquid. Sark leads Jack and Vaughn into the tomb after capturing them, and Sloane shoots Jack in the chest to force Sydney and Vaughn to leave. Seeing her father severely wounded, Sydney grabs a gun and eventually shoots Sloane several times, who crashes into the puddle of Rambaldi-fluid. With Sloane seemingly dead, Sydney tries to stay with her bleeding father, but he begs her to leave him and to stop Irina. Sydney reluctantly obeys and departs for Hong Kong for a final confrontation with Irina. Jack drags himself back into the tomb and confronts Sloane, who has become immortal because of the fluid. Sloane offers to heal Jack, but Jack tells Sloane that he has caused so much pain for Sydney over the years that he will not allow him to do it again and reveals a bomb that he strapped to his body and detonates it, killing himself. The explosion causes a cave in and Sloane is trapped in there forever.

In Hong Kong, Sydney and Irina clash a final time, with Sydney seeking to stop Irina from using the Horizon to gain immortality. In the course of the fight, Irina ends up atop a glass skylight, the Horizon just inches away from her. With the glass cracking under Irina's weight, Sydney pleads with her to take her hand. Irina refuses and attempts to grab the Horizon. The glass breaks completely, causing Irina to fall to her death.

The series ends a few years into the future. Sydney and Vaughn are married and semi-retired and are now living in a beachside house on an obviously very far off island. Dixon comes to visit and is greeted by Vaughn and Sydney, who is holding their second child who is named Jack after Sydney's father. Isabelle has found the blocks for Project Christmas and assembles them in no time, but dismantles it after Sydney calls for her and she joins her family outside. As everyone walks down the beach, the screen cuts to black with the message: THANK YOU FOR FIVE INCREDIBLE YEARS.

== Casting ==
Before landing the lead role in Alias, Garner auditioned five times for a guest appearance in J. J. Abrams's Felicity. When Abrams created Alias, he wanted Garner to portray Sydney. "There was something about her that I just thought was really special. I always thought she had something in her personality that was funnier and sexier and smarter and more mischievous than anything I'd seen her do. And when I wrote Sydney, I wanted to show that," he said. Melissa George, who went on to play Lauren Reed on the show, was also considered for the role of Sydney. Garner took private martial arts lessons for one month during the audition process. She did many of the physical stunts herself throughout the series. Her first stunt double was Dana Hee, who was later replaced by Shauna Duggins.

== Reception ==
As of 2004, Sydney was named one of the 10 best current characters by Zap2it. In June 2010, she was ranked No. 42 on Entertainment Weekly's "100 Greatest Characters of the Last 20 Years". UGO.com ranked her the 20th Top TV Character out of 50. Sydney was listed AOL TV's "100 Most Memorable Female TV Characters", ranking at No. 27. and AfterEllen.com's Top 50 Favorite Female TV Characters. Bristow also appeared in Maxim's list of the Hottest Nerd Crushes. She was also included in Total Sci-Fi Online's list of The 25 Women Who Shook Sci-Fi. TV Guide named her one of TV's Toughest Ladies. Her relationship with Michael Vaughn was featured in TV Guide's list of the best TV couples of all time.

Garner also received critical acclaim for her performance. She won a Golden Globe Award for Best Actress – Television Series Drama out of four consecutive nominations, as well as four Emmy nominations for her lead performance. She was nominated for the Screen Actors Guild Award for Outstanding Performance by a Female Actor in a Drama Series in 2004 and she won the award in 2005.

In August 2003, the actual CIA enlisted Jennifer Garner to appear in a recruitment video, which would be shown at fairs and college campuses. A CIA officer said: "Jennifer and the character of Sydney Bristow both reflect a lot of the qualities we look for in new career field officers."
