= Arvin Sloane =

- Alias character
- Ron Rifkin as Arvin Sloane
- First appearance: "Truth Be Told" (episode 1.01)
- Last appearance: "All the Time in the World" (episode 5.17)
- Portrayed by: Ron Rifkin

In-universe information
- Gender: Male
- Title(s): Alliance of Twelve Senior Partner; President of Omnifam; Director of APO; APO Deputy Director (demoted)
- Occupation: Army Corps of Engineers CIA; Director of SD-6; Alliance of Twelve; Omnifam; The Covenant; APO; Prophet Five
- Spouse: Emily Sloane
- Children: Jacquelyn Sloane (daughter); Nadia Santos (daughter)
- Nationality: American

Arvin Sloane is a fictional character played by Ron Rifkin. He was the former director of SD-6 on the television series, Alias. TV Guide included him in their 2013 list of The 60 Nastiest Villains of All Time.

== Biography ==
Arvin Sloane is the cold, calculating leader of SD-6, directing its operations against the U.S. government under the guise of being a secret organization within the government itself. He is eventually promoted to being a full member of "The Alliance", the organization that operates above each individual SD cell.

It is revealed through the course of the series that Sloane speaks Spanish, French, Japanese, Nepali, Mandarin, and Russian and reads Homeric Greek. It was revealed in the third season that Sloane has a life-threatening allergy to morphine.

Sloane is married to his long-time wife, Emily, for over 30 years. Early in his marriage Sloane was with the CIA, attached to the US Army Corps of Engineers, which is where he first encountered the works of Milo Rambaldi. Initially, Sloane dismissed Rambaldi and his works. That would change following the death of Arvin and Emily's infant daughter, Jacqueline. Wracked with grief, Sloane stumbled across some Rambaldi pages that he had stuck in a desk drawer and forgotten about. Reviewing the pages, Sloane was gripped by the possibilities inherent in what he saw there. This interest would rapidly grow into an obsession with all things Rambaldi.

At some point, Sloane had a brief affair with Jack Bristow's wife, Irina Derevko (alias Laura). This resulted in the birth of the child who would become known as Nadia Santos. It is unclear exactly when this affair took place or exactly when Nadia was born. Sydney Bristow was born in 1975. It's stated in the series that Michael Vaughn's father kidnapped Nadia for her own safety when she was a young girl, and he was killed by Irina in 1979. It's also stated that Irina gave birth to Nadia in a Russian prison after she left Jack. Sydney is age 6 when Irina fakes her death in late 1981, which means that Nadia must have been born in 1982. The timelines cannot be reconciled. Regardless of the exact timeline, Jack did not learn of this affair for over two decades. After Irina's apparent death, Jack was taken into federal custody and Sloane and Emily became Sydney's temporary guardians. Sydney believes that she didn't meet Sloane until she was recruited, as she reveals in season 2 episode Cipher that she has "big gaps in [her] memory" around the time of the death of her mother.

Some time after that, Sloane and a number of other CIA agents broke from the agency to attach themselves to the Alliance of Twelve. Sloane eventually became head of that section of the Alliance known as SD-6. When Sydney was 19 and a freshman in college, Sloane recruited her to join SD-6, convincing her that she was joining the CIA.

== Storyline ==
=== Season 1 ===
Partway through season 1, it is revealed that Emily was suffering from apparent terminal cancer. Emily learned that her husband had never truly left the world of intelligence. She made the mistake of telling Sydney what she knew and SD-6 soon caught wind of this fact. As a condition of Sloane's being promoted to a full member of the Alliance he was ordered to kill his wife. Unable to bring himself to do this, Sloane set up an elaborate ruse, including the amputation of Emily's finger, to convince the Alliance that she was dead.

=== Season 2 ===
Concurrent with his engineering the downfall of The Alliance and SD-6, Sloane went underground, allying with Julian Sark and continuing his obsessive pursuit of Rambaldi artifacts. Emily collaborated secretly with the CIA to expose her husband's new crimes and consented to helping them capture Sloane by wearing a hidden wire but was coaxed by Sloane, during this operation, swaying Emily from her cooperation with the CIA, thus allowing them to foil the CIA's original task. They attempted to flee together, with cover fire from Julian Sark and the help of Sydney's mother, Irina Derevko, (who was stealing a Rambaldi book) to Sloan's awaiting helicopter, but Emily was accidentally shot in the shoulder by the bullet meant for her husband and killed by Marcus Dixon, a former SD-6 agent now with the CIA. In retaliation, Sloane later arranged for Dixon's death by having a bomb placed in his vehicle one night while he and his wife, Diane, were having dinner with Sydney & Vaughn. Dixon & Diane were supposed to be in the same vehicle but ended up driving separate vehicles that night. His wife, who had already gotten into her SUV and was driving away, was killed in the car bomb explosion. At the last minute, Dixon had turned around and was coming back to tell Sydney something, sparing him from seeing the actual explosion.

=== Season 3 ===
Between seasons 2 and 3 (the two-year gap where Sydney went missing), Sloane turned himself in to the U.S. government and, in exchange for a full pardon, utilized all of his knowledge to help bring down various terrorist organizations. Sloane then moved to Zürich, Switzerland, setting up a humanitarian organization called Omnifam and apparently becoming a philanthropist, claiming that his research into Rambaldi's secrets led him to one word: peace. Sloane still occasionally worked for the CIA by utilizing his contacts with the Covenant and other organizations, but his motives still elicited suspicion within the government, and particularly from Sydney, who never forgave him for authorizing the murder of her fiancé during the SD-6 days.

In fact, besides the word "peace", the Rambaldi device known as Il Dire (The Telling) printed out the DNA pattern for a person Rambaldi called The Passenger. Sloane determined that The Passenger was his daughter with Irina Derevko, a woman named Nadia Santos who was an agent with Argentine intelligence. Sloane abducts her and injects her with a green "Rambaldi fluid" which makes her a "living conduit to Rambaldi". Nadia generates a complex algebraic equation that translates into a longitude and latitude for another Rambaldi artifact, The Sphere of Life. Sloane and Nadia briefly teamed up to recover the Sphere, but Nadia left her father when it appeared his Rambaldi obsession had become madness; she returned to Argentina.

=== Season 4 ===
Sloane is subsequently pardoned again and is recruited by the CIA to head up a new black ops division patterned after SD-6, called Authorized Personnel Only (APO). Sloane's first task was to hand-pick the agents he wanted to serve in the APO, choosing Sydney, Jack, Dixon and Vaughn. He later successfully convinced Nadia to join and added Marshall Flinkman and Eric Weiss.

Sloane's biggest challenge as the head of APO was in convincing Sydney, Vaughn, and Marcus that his intentions are genuine. Under orders by CIA superiors to keep close tabs on Sloane, the three agents have on several occasions sparked false alarms as to Sloane's loyalty. Meanwhile, Sloane and Jack have been following an agenda of their own, that appears to be related to the surviving sisters of Irina Derevko.

Late in season four it was revealed there was another man, dubbed "Arvin Clone" and virtually identical to Arvin Sloane in every way, was still tracking down Rambaldi artifacts in Sloane's name and committing numerous criminal acts in the process. "Arvin Clone" (real name Ned Bolger) is blamed for Irina's death by setting her up to appear as if she had contracted an assassin to kill Sydney. It is eventually explained that Bolger was chosen because his brainwaves were similar to Sloane's, allowing him to be part of a complex program to 'clone' Sloane's own brain patterns on to Bolger, allowing him to be grafted with a copy of Sloane's memories to help his superiors find Rambaldi artefacts by drawing on Sloane's expertise.

Toward the conclusion of the fourth season, Sloane confesses that through his work with Omnifam, he has seeded water supplies around the world with chemical contaminants designed to make humanity more peaceful. He abandons his post as APO director, apparently to join Elena Derevko's scheme to destroy civilization using the contaminated water in conjunction with the Mueller device. In reality, Sloane is infiltrating Elena's organization in order to stop her endgame but Dixon is seriously wounded when trying to stop Sloane. During the final mission to stop Elena, Sloane aids APO, but in doing so is forced to shoot Nadia (who has been transformed by the chemical contaminants into a killing machine and is strangling Sydney). As the season ends, Sloane is imprisoned by the CIA, but receives an unexpected visit from Sydney, who tells him she believes his motives were good as she arranges for him to visit with his daughter.

=== Season 5 ===
During the fifth season, Sloane finds himself at the mercy of turncoat CIA agent Gordon Dean, who runs an SD-6-like criminal organization called "The Shed" on behalf of a larger group called Prophet Five. Dean arranges for Sloane to be released from federal custody, opening the door for Sloane to be reinstated with APO (albeit at a lower rank), which will allow Sloane to search for a cure for Nadia's condition. Dean threatens to undo all this if Sloane doesn't agree to act as a mole within APO.

This arrangement is short-lived as Sloane ultimately refuses to jeopardize the safety of Sydney or the others any longer, and he betrays Dean. Dean is captured by APO, but Sloane soon finds himself becoming beholden to another (as yet unexplained) element of Prophet Five, who holds the key to curing Nadia. This is proven when Nadia briefly regains consciousness. Under the promise of a more permanent cure, Sloane is ordered to kill Dean, which he does. Once again, Sloane is forced to act as a mole within APO on behalf of Prophet Five, with a vague promise of a cure for Nadia. When he attempts to use his new contact to locate Sydney after she is kidnapped, he is asked to make a choice between saving Sydney and saving Nadia.

Ultimately, Sloane continues to work with Prophet Five until they provide him with a cure for Nadia's condition. He administers it, and she is successfully cured. Sloane's relationship with Nadia was always hindered by his obsession with Rambaldi's work (frequently at the expense of her well-being). This tension between his love for Nadia and his fixation upon Rambaldi comes to a head when Nadia demands that he choose between her and Page 47. The severity of his dichotomy was evident as he tearfully begs Nadia, "Please, don't make me choose between the two most important things in my life." When Nadia casts Page 47 into the fireplace, Sloane's obsession takes hold and he throws her out of the way to save it, accidentally killing her when she falls through a glass table.

Following Nadia's death, Sloane realizes that his faith in Rambaldi was all he ever truly had, making the betrayal of his loved ones inevitable. Nadia's death, according to this interpretation, was a necessary sacrifice. Sloane then leaves APO to join Prophet Five and see Rambaldi's work to its conclusion. Sloane subsequently is haunted by an apparition of Nadia, who states she is only appearing because Sloane wants her to be there.

Sloane realized that once his expertise with Rambaldi was no longer necessary to Prophet Five, he would be 'removed' from their services permanently. To this end he convinced Julian Sark and Kelly Peyton to betray Prophet Five and ally with him, having Peyton execute all leaders of Prophet Five and having Sark eliminate APO with high explosives (killing Thomas Grace).

Sloane finally set about achieving his endgame, kidnapping Marshall Flinkman and Rachel Gibson to force them to hack into a satellite network to locate a cavern where he could utilize another Rambaldi artifact, an amulet, to uncover further details towards the fruition of his ultimate goal.

Finally, Sloane's endgame was achieved in Mongolia, in the Tomb of Rambaldi, where Sloane used The Horizon to create a strange hovering sphere from which a reddish liquid drained. However, before the purpose of this sphere could be revealed, Sydney intervened, removing The Horizon from its setting and causing the sphere to dissipate. A stand-off ensued and Sloane shot Jack to distract Sydney long enough for Sark to recover The Horizon from her. However, Sloane himself was shot and killed in retaliation by Sydney, one bullet entering his head to confirm a kill.

As Sloane's body collapsed, he fell into a vat of the strange liquid created by The Horizon which imbued with him special gifts, apparently the ultimate revelation of Rambaldi, immortality. Sloane recovered from his bullet wounds and was revived fully intact but was confronted by a dying Jack Bristow. Sloane offered his old friend the chance to be saved in the same rejuvenating liquid but Jack refused. Instead, Jack trapped Sloane in the tomb forever by detonating a powerful explosive and sacrificing himself.

Sloane is currently trapped under large rocks in the tomb, several hundred feet underground and alone but he is alive and seemingly immortal. The Nadia apparition makes one final appearance before vanishing. It is implied that his fate is to spend eternity trapped in this place.

== Jacquelyn Sloane ==
Thirty years before season 4, Emily Sloane was pregnant with her and Arvin's daughter. They had considered other names, but eventually stuck with Jacquelyn. It is suggested that the baby died during birth. According to Arvin, it was a risky pregnancy and the baby had fought hard to stay with them, but in the end it was overwhelming and her heart was not strong enough.
