= Nadia Santos =

Fictional character in the television series Alias

- Alias character
- Mía Maestro as Nadia Santos
- First appearance: "Blood Ties" (episode 3.20)
- Last appearance: "All the Time in the World" (episode 5.17)
- Portrayed by: Mía Maestro

In-universe information
- Alias: Evergreen
- Gender: Female
- Occupation: SIDE (Argentina) field agent APO field agent
- Relatives: Arvin Sloane (father); Irina Derevko (mother); Emily Sloane (step-mother); Jack Bristow (step-father); Jacqueline Sloane (paternal half-sister); Sydney Bristow (maternal half-sister); Elena Derevko (aunt); Katya Derevko (aunt); Isabelle Vaughn (niece); Jack Vaughn (nephew); Michael Vaughn (brother-in-law)
- Nationality: Russian; Argentine; American

Nadia Santos is a fictional character in the television series Alias, and a main character during the series' fourth season. She is played by Mía Maestro.

== Biography ==
Introduced near the end of the third season, Nadia is the daughter resulting from an affair between Irina Derevko and Arvin Sloane. She is the half-sister of Sydney Bristow and Jacqueline Sloane (Arvin's daughter with his wife, Emily). According to Irina's sister Katya, Nadia was born in a Soviet prison and taken away from Irina the day after her birth. Identified by the Soviets as "The Passenger", a being with a "direct conduit" to Milo Rambaldi, Nadia spent the first few years of her life as the subject of experimentation, including injection with a "Rambaldi fluid" which triggered her connection to Rambaldi.

According to Elena Derevko (speaking in her guise as Sophia Vargas), Michael Vaughn's father Bill kidnapped Nadia from Soviet custody and left her with Vargas. Regardless of the circumstances of her arrival, Nadia grew up in an orphanage in Argentina under the direction of Elena/Sophia. After being attacked by a man in the orphanage one night, Nadia ran away and spent her teen years on the streets, committing some 130 criminal acts including assault and petty theft. At the age of 17 or 18 she was captured by police. Roberto Fox, an Argentine intelligence operative, was impressed by her skill and recruited her into a branch of Argentina's intelligence service (SIDE). She spent the next few years being trained as a spy. Eventually, she became romantically involved with Fox.

In reality, Fox was a rogue agent operating for his own interests and not those of Argentina, a fact Nadia learned during a mission to obtain secret documents during which a close friend and colleague was killed. Nadia learned the documents were in fact from the Argentine government. For this betrayal, she shot and killed Roberto Fox upon her return from the mission, however (for reasons not explained) the blame for his murder fell upon César Martinez, a fellow operative who, like Nadia, had been recruited from the streets. She continued working in Argentine intelligence after this event, while Martinez became a freelancer, using the equity of his supposed kill to establish a reputation with criminal organizations.

Santos first meets her half-sister Sydney while undercover posing as a supposedly catatonic woman in a Chechen labor camp. She is being sought by her father, Sloane, who wants to use her connection to Rambaldi to locate an artifact called the Sphere of Life. This artifact is said to house Rambaldi's consciousness. The Covenant captures her and injects her with the same Rambaldi fluid she was subjected to as a child. This triggers a "muscle memory", causing Nadia to write out a complex algebraic equation which, when solved, reveals the coordinates of the Sphere of Life. Sydney, Vaughn and a CIA team then recover Nadia. Later, Sloane approaches her and convinces her to join him on a quest for the Sphere of Life. Nadia says she had moments of lucidity as the fluid wore off and in those times she altered the equation so only she knows the true location of the Sphere.

Between seasons three and four, as shown in season four flashbacks, Nadia and Sloane locate the Sphere of Life in Siena. Nadia, seeing the madness Rambaldi inspires in Sloane grow as they get closer to the artifact, and after having apocalyptic visions upon touching the Sphere, refuses to retrieve it. Sloane berates her and tries to retrieve the Sphere himself, failing and gravely injuring himself. Nadia saves his life and apparently turns the Sphere over to the CIA or the Department of Special Research.

At the start of the fourth season, Nadia had broken ties with her father and returned to Argentina to live a peaceful life. After assisting the newly formed APO unit in rescuing her sister, she accepted a position with the organization, which is a black ops offshoot of the CIA. As of joining APO her code name was Evergreen. Upon learning of her mother's supposed death from Sydney, she swore an oath to kill the person responsible for killing Irina, not knowing "Irina" was killed by Jack in order to protect Sydney (it is later revealed Jack actually killed a woman who was genetically doubled to appear as Irina).

Jack led Nadia to believe Irina had been killed by Martin Bishop, a master thief with terrorist connections who had taken Sydney prisoner during an APO mission gone astray. Nadia shot Bishop to death during the mission to rescue Sydney and continued to fire bullets into him until her gun ran out of ammunition.

Nadia continued to try to learn more about her mother, which led her to bond somewhat with Jack. During the fourth season, she was romantically involved with her CIA colleague, Eric Weiss.

Nadia is troubled by a recurring dream in which she and Sydney fight to the death. In the fourth season, she is shot by terrorist Anna Espinosa and left in a medically induced coma for several days, avoiding a second assassination attempt in the hospital thanks to quick thinking on the part of her father. Against medical advice, Jack Bristow revives Nadia from the coma in order to obtain vital information regarding the whereabouts of a chemical bomb stolen by Anna; although Nadia survives this, Jack's actions threaten to unravel a larger plan between him and Sloane.

On a mission to stop Elena Derevko from implementing her endgame by activating a giant Mueller device over Russia, Nadia is infected with a compound which turns her into a mindless killing machine and (true to Rambaldi's prophecy) she tries to kill her sister. Nadia nearly kills Sydney but is shot by her father. She survives the gunshot and as season 4 ends is in a coma as CIA doctors work to find a cure for her condition.

The character is not a regular during the early episodes of season 5, although the hunt for a cure is shown as a prime motivator for Sloane's actions. Nadia does make a non-speaking cameo at the conclusion of the episode "Solo"; in a later episode, Nadia was briefly revived from her coma by Prophet Five as a way of continuing Sloane's support.

In the episode "30 Seconds", Nadia is finally revived permanently when Sloane administers to her a drug designed by Rambaldi, though in order for it to work, he must first kill her (which he does by suffocating her). After her revival, Nadia returns to live with Sydney and wrestle with her feelings towards her father. At the end of the episode, she finally confronts him about his obsession with Rambaldi when she discovers a Rambaldi artifact ("Page 47") hidden in Sloane's home. When she tries to destroy the page Sloane, in a brief fit of madness, pushes her into a glass coffee table. A shard of glass punctures her neck and Nadia is killed.

Nadia appeared in subsequent episodes as an apparition who haunts (and distracts) Sloane as he works to complete his endgame. When Sloane asks her why she is haunting him, she replies it's because he wants her to. In the end, as a now immortal Sloane lies seemingly trapped forever in Rambaldi's tomb, Nadia's apparition appears saying "You're all alone", Sloane retorts with "At least I have you", to which Nadia replies "No!" and fades away leaving Sloane forever alone.

Nadia spoke English, Portuguese, Spanish, Russian, and German on her missions.
