= Organizations of Alias =

Groups in the ABC spy fiction series

The following is a list of organizations in the TV series, Alias.

== Department for Special Research ==
A fictional branch of the United States government, the Department for Special Research (DSR) oversees the search for, and analysis of, items of special interest, including the Rambaldi artifacts. As explained by Michael Vaughn, the department was formed during WWII to investigate Adolf Hitler's Nazi Party interest in the occult. After the war, an executive order empowered the DSR to expand investigation into fringe science, parapsychology, remote viewing, and so forth.

In season one, DSR personnel take custody of the Rambaldi Manuscripts, while Dr. Carson Evans oversees testing on Sydney Bristow, and recites an excerpt of The Prophecy concerning "The Chosen One" from a now-revealed page of the manuscripts.

In season three, it is revealed that Kendall's job as FBI Assistant Director is a cover for his management of the DSR facility in Nevada, called Project Black Hole, which stores artifacts. CIA Division Director Marcus Dixon also has Black Hole access. With Dixon's help, Sydney infiltrates the Nevada facility to steal the Rambaldi Box (item #45) to exchange it for Dixon's daughter, who was taken by The Covenant.

== Alliance of Twelve ==
The Alliance of Twelve is a fictional international organized crime group in the television series Alias. It is involved in the trade of intelligence and weapons as well as in blackmail. SD-6 is one of its subsidiary cells. The organization was founded by Alain Christophe, once a CIA counterintelligence officer, as well as other former agents of various other intelligence agencies and wealthy individuals investing in the spy trade after the Cold War. The Alliance of Twelve is an enemy of the United States and a rival to the CIA.

=== Organizational structure ===
The Alliance is led by a board of directors, one of them being Arvin Sloane. Some members are from the private sector, but most are former intelligence officers. All of them are wealthy. The organization is divided into 12 sections, named SD-1 through SD-12. "SD" stands for Section Disparu – literally, the section which has disappeared in French (Sydney translates it as "the section that doesn't exist" in the episode Q&A), this was coined by founder Alain Christophe. These organizational cells are spread over 12 major cities of the world. The Alliance takes in recruits and tricks them to believe they are working for the CIA when in reality they are not.

=== Objectives ===
The purview of the Alliance is the black market trading of weapons, military secrets, industrial intelligence, medical technology, computer advances, and political agendas. Its clients include governments, corporations, wealthy citizens, and families.

The Alliance aims to eventually reach world domination through its control over organized crime and the trade of intelligence. According to Jack Bristow and Arvin Sloane, the Alliance once wished to change the world when it had achieved this, and rid the world of corruption, but had become bloated and corrupt over the years, diverging from their original vision and focusing instead on profit.

=== Actions ===
According to Sydney Bristow in the episode "Q and A", the Alliance of Twelve was responsible for the carbon proxy disaster in 1992, in which an accidental methyl isocyanate leak at the manufacturer plant in Bhopal, Madhyapradesh, India killed three thousand people and injured another thousand, leaving them disabled. In 1996, near Kyoto, Japan, a bullet train accidentally switched tracks and derailed, killing a hundred and fifty people. The Alliance was also responsible for that disaster. In 2001, the Alliance caused a transport plane in Germany to suffer mechanical failures outside Munich, killing twelve people. The disasters were falsely believed to have been accidents. In truth, some were acts of revenge, others were personal favors to those who helped fund the Alliance. Some were distractions so that local resources were occupied so that SD-4 or SD-7 could infiltrate a building somewhere and retrieve sensitive data.

=== SD-6 ===
SD-6, headed by Arvin Sloane and based in Los Angeles, is the focus of the first two seasons of Alias. SD-6 pretends to be part of the CIA and states its objective as "retrieval and study of intelligence both military and industrial throughout the world that is critical to the superiority and survival of the United States of America." Even its own members, initially including agent Sydney Bristow, believe it is a black ops division of the CIA; and only a handful of senior staff know the truth and are complicit in the deception.

In the first episode of Alias, Sydney learns from her father, Jack, about the organization's true character as a part of The Alliance of Twelve. During the course of the first season, other heads of the SD cells are eventually shown meeting. Among them was Edward Poole, head of SD-9 (played by Roger Moore), who manages to convince Sloane to kill fellow SD head Jean Briault to influence an upcoming vote on whether to declare war on Alexander Khasinau, who has eliminated rival groups FTL and K-Directorate. Another SD leader is identified by the first name "Ramon," but his last name and his SD cell number are unrevealed.

=== Paranoia and ruthlessness ===
==== Of SD-6 ====
SD-6 branch was headquartered in the Credit Dauphine building in Los Angeles, with entry through a special elevator to the sixth sub-level of the building. Every person who entered would be biometrically scanned and visually confirmed. As a security measure, all three areas of the foundations of the building itself were rigged with C-4 explosives that would go off if the inner vault had been breached during a security lockdown or for other contingencies. Fail-safe or lockdown procedures could be carried out only by Arvin Sloane, using his right index fingerprint; presumably, other SD cells had similar contingency plans (such as for deterring a CIA raid, which happens in Season 2) that would make it difficult to shut down.

In addition, SD-6 employed an internal security group responsible for investigating and terminating individuals who even know of SD-6's existence, those believed to know about the true nature of SD-6, or those suspected to be Double agents or traitors to SD-6. Sydney's fiancée, Danny, was murdered by SD-6's internal security division in Season 1 after Sydney revealed to him that she works for SD-6, believing it to be a part of the CIA.

==== Of The Alliance ====
In addition to the cell-like nature of Section Disparu, which presumably allows the termination of entire SD cells in the event that it is wholly compromised, the Alliance of Twelve is an utterly ruthless organization that constantly suspects and conduct surveillance of even its head members.

When Arvin Sloane's wife, Emily, admits to knowing of the existence of SD-6, Arvin is told to have his wife killed as a test of loyalty. Arvin was able to win a temporary reprieve because of his wife's cancer which would kill her soon; when her cancer is found to be in remission, he is again told that in order to become a "full partner" in The Alliance, he would have to kill his wife. He then faked his wife's death by drugging her wine and putting her in suspended animation.

Having proven his loyalty to the members of The Alliance, he is welcomed as a full partner and injected in the neck with a tracking device and mini-microphone to have his movements and conversations recorded 24/7. Although Sloane was clearly privy to matters that only a handful of men and women knew about, he was clearly not yet part of an 'inner circle' within The Alliance board, suggesting that there is some sense of competition and suspicion among the SD cells and their leaders.

=== The end of The Alliance ===
The Alliance came to an end in the middle of Season 2 (Episode 13, "Phase One") of Alias when Sydney stumbles upon information, with Sark's aid, that leads her and Vaughn to believe there is one master server, server 47 (in keeping with the Rambaldi sub-plot of the show, where 47 is a key number in Rambaldi's works), which could potentially have all the information the CIA would need to shut down all of the SD cells simultaneously, thus acting as a sort of 'silver bullet' to the cell-like nature of the Alliance.

Although the server was located on a Boeing 747 plane that was constantly airborne as a security measure, Sydney was able to pose as an escort for the computer technicians on board during one of its landings and copy all the information from the server. When Jack attempted to go back to SD-6 headquarters to get confirmation that the information was genuine (as the CIA would only have one chance), he was apprehended by the acting head Geiger (Sloane had taken off and was declared MIA by the Alliance) who accused him of being a CIA spy.

Knowing she could not go back herself, Sydney called her SD-6 partner Marcus Dixon to get the confirmation and tells Dixon the true nature of SD-6. With this information, the CIA was able to successfully raid all the offices of various SD cells around the world; Sydney was a part of the CIA team that infiltrated SD-6 headquarters in Los Angeles and rescued her father moments before he would be electrocuted by Geiger. It is then revealed that Sloane had planned the destruction of the Alliance, having a technician bypass the surveillance devices in his neck, and he and Sark had supplied Sydney with the information the CIA needed to remove The Alliance – after he had cleared out (apparently) all Rambaldi artifacts to his own location outside of SD-6. However, one artifact escaped Sloane's attention. This artifact, the Horizon, had been sought by Prophet Five for thirty years, and was eventually retrieved (after coercing Sydney) by Irina Derevko, who then betrayed Prophet Five, almost four years after the fall of the Alliance.

== The Covenant ==
The Covenant is a large, powerful, and secretive intelligence/terrorist organization.

The Covenant was a "loose affiliation of Russian nationalists" composed of retired KGB and former Central Committee members, all dedicated to the new world envisioned by Milo Rambaldi. It functioned much like an organized crime family. At one point, it had six cell leaders, until Julian Sark and Lauren Reed (a double agent in the United States National Security Council who was Michael Vaughn's wife) assassinated them in a bid for power. The Covenant had secured Sark's release to gain access to his wealth as a Romanov descendant. McKenas Cole had somehow managed to secure his own release and was now the second most powerful individual in the Covenant. During season 3, it was based in St. Petersburg. Two of its front companies were the Dryden Bank and Chantre Telecom.

Following the end of season 2 and prior to the beginning of season 3, The Covenant kidnapped Sydney Bristow and attempted to brainwash her into believing she was a Covenant agent. Sydney operated as a double agent for the CIA using the alias Julia Thorne for almost two years. Eventually, Sydney left the Covenant and had her memory of that time erased in an effort to prevent the Covenant from gaining a crucial Rambaldi artifact, later revealed to be the Sphere of Life. FBI Assistant Director Kendall later told Sydney about those missing years and how she was able to escape the Covenant with his help.

At the end of season 3 Lauren Reed was killed and Sark was captured. In season 4 the Covenant has disappeared as a threat, and Sark later referred to the "implosion of the Covenant." However, the "implosion" was a ruse perpetrated by Elena Derevko, who was revealed to be the leader of the Covenant, and that Irina Derevko had actually been trying to prevent Elena's endgame. Elena's new headquarters is in Prague and was eventually raided; however, she managed to escape.

Elena's endgame, based on her interpretation of one of Rambaldi's prophecies, was an apocalypse called Il Diluvio, The Flood. Covenant operatives primed the world's water with Rambaldi substances and Elena activated an enormous Mueller device in Sovogda, Russia. The device broadcast a frequency which caused those who had consumed the tainted water to go into a mindless rage. Elena's intent was that, after the entire world's population had been affected, the Earth would be "cleansed" with very few survivors. With the help of Irina, the APO team managed to prevent The Flood, and Irina killed Elena. However, Nadia Santos had been captured and injected with the tainted water and sent out to fight her sister Sydney, as foreseen by Rambaldi. Sydney only managed to survive with the intervention of Arvin Sloane, who shot Nadia and put her in a coma.

=== Known Covenant members ===
- Elena Derevko (leader)
- Roger Barris (leader)
- Ned Bolger (aka "Arvin Clone;" believed himself to be Arvin Sloane and not associated with The Covenant)
- Kazari Bomani
- Sydney Bristow (alias Julia Thorne; double agent)
- "Coke Bottle Glasses" (real name unknown; Elena's underling)
- McKenas Cole (Elena's second in command and chief of operations)
- "Irina Derevko" (real name unknown; volunteered to be doubled and killed by Jack Bristow)
- Katya Derevko (allied, possibly as a ruse to help bring down Elena; exact status unknown)
- Allison Doren
- Johannes Gathird (one of the cell leaders assassinated by Lauren Reed)
- Gerhard Kronish (a cell leader assassinated by Sark or Reed)
- Leonid Lisenker (defected in North Korea)
- Oleg Madrczyk (tried to turn Sydney into Julia Thorne; later killed by Sydney)
- Calvin McCullough (former head of SD-6 Psychological Warfare Division, responsible for creating "Arvin Clone")
- Lucien Nisard (led a raid on the Department of Special Research to obtain Rambaldi artifacts)
- Lauren Reed (co-leader of North American cell)
- Olivia Reed
- Uschek San'ko (Sark's main Covenant contact. Formed the Cadmus Revolutionary Front from former Covenant operatives. Assassinated by Anna Espinosa)
- Julian Sark (co-leader of North American cell, chief financier)
- Arvin Sloane (first a double agent, then partnered with Elena)
- Gordei Volkov (Russian hitman)

== The Trust ==
The Trust is a secretive organization within the U.S. Government which, like the DSR, is interested in knowledge of Milo Rambaldi. Initially, its agenda is unknown. It is revealed in season three that Arvin Sloane had been recruited as a Trust agent through Senator George Reed, father of NSC agent Lauren Reed, two years prior (shortly after The Covenant abducted Sydney Bristow). In exchange for a pardon for his crimes, Sloane was tasked with providing information regarding Rambaldi artifacts to the Trust. Jack Bristow uncovers proof of the Trust's existence from Diego Machuca, who vouches that Sloane told the truth, and reveals that they are funded by a black budget front called "Project Centigrade." Later, Bristow learns there are five inner-circle members, each with access to their vault below the Smithsonian Institution which houses their Rambaldi collection. DOJ Director of Legal Policy Marlon Bell, who oversaw Sloane's execution, is also a member. Sydney raids their vault to obtain a Rambaldi artifact that, powered by liquid from The Hourglass, prints out brain waves with which they locate The Passenger.

== Authorized Personnel Only ==
Authorized Personnel Only (APO) is a fictional black ops unit within the Central Intelligence Agency in the American TV series Alias. It was formed at the beginning of Season 4 and is headquartered beneath the Los Angeles subway system.

=== History and background ===
Its first director was Arvin Sloane, who also gave the organization its name as an inside joke since the main entrance to APO's headquarters was behind a maintenance door in the Los Angeles subway system marked "Authorized Personnel Only". Concerned that increased public scrutiny of the CIA and resulting red tape has impeded their ability to do their job, the CIA asked Sloane to set up the covert unit as one that is still governed by U.S. laws, but unhampered by bureaucratic chain of command with no accountability except to themselves. Sloane was chosen because of his experience running SD-6, which successfully posed as a CIA black ops division for several years. All of its initial members were hand-picked by Sloane, and in order to maintain APO's cover as a unit that officially doesn't exist, all members from previous seasons officially resign from the CIA under varying circumstances to work for APO.

Although headed by Sloane, APO ultimately answered to CIA Director Hayden Chase, and at the end of Season 4, Sloane was removed from his post and replaced by Jack Bristow, who remained in charge of APO into Season 5. Sloane ultimately returned to APO as assistant director, although unknown to his colleagues he was now a mole for Prophet Five, a criminal organization that also pretended to be the CIA in order to recruit. Sloane was allowed back into APO in order to use its resources to find a cure for Nadia Santos, his daughter, after the events of the season 4 finale.

=== Personnel ===
The first agents recruited and their new call signs are:

- Jack Bristow – Raptor
- Sydney Bristow – Phoenix
- Michael Vaughn – Shotgun
- Marcus Dixon – Outrigger

Nadia Santos (Evergreen) later joined APO at her request. Marshall Flinkman (Merlin) was recruited to serve as tech support. Eric Weiss also became a member after crossing paths with Sydney and Vaughn during an APO mission.

In the fifth season, APO gained two new members following the apparent death of Michael Vaughn, Eric Weiss's transfer to Washington D.C. and Nadia's hospitalization for her illness. Thomas Grace (Sidewinder) was recruited from another division of the CIA, while Rachel Gibson (Oracle) was a former, unwitting agent of The Shed who thought she was working for the CIA while under Gordon Dean; Rachel essentially took over Sydney's former role as the double agent in the enemy organization while Sydney acted as Rachel's handler just as Vaughn was once hers, particularly since Sydney's current pregnancy limited her abilities as a field agent.

As the series approached its finale, numerous changes occurred in APO. Arvin Sloane was removed as director and replaced by Jack Bristow. As Sloane's endgame began to come to fruition, involving moles within the CIA itself, Bristow began to hide information from CIA oversight.

In the series finale, APO headquarters was destroyed by a large bomb planted in the subway by Julian Sark, who was working with Sloane. APO and the subway were evacuated, but agent Thomas Grace died in the blast. (The episode revealed that APO headquarters was within a few blocks of Los Angeles City Hall, meaning that APO must be in the Civic Center Station).

The series ends with a "flash-forward" to several years into the future (roughly 2014). Marcus Dixon is referred to as "deputy director" but it is not indicated whether APO still exists in this future time.

== Prophet Five ==
Screengrab from Series Finale

The Shed is a fictional criminal operation in the television series Alias. The leader of the Shed was initially Gordon Dean, and later temporarily, Kelly Peyton, though her superiors warned her that any more betrayals would lead to severe consequences and they both ultimately answered to a larger group: Prophet Five. Prophet Five served as an Illuminati-like conspiracy group in the fifth season of Alias. The headquarters of Prophet Five was in Barcelona, Spain, with known Shed satellite offices in Prague, Cleveland, Seattle, Chicago and St. Louis.

=== History and objectives ===
Prophet Five was started in the 1970s by Oskar Mueller as a project funded by a private foundation. Parts of the project were compartmentalized, but it is known that the "best and the brightest" mathematicians, linguists, scientists, and cryptologists, including James Lehman and the father of André Michaux, were recruited to decrypt a section of a 15th-century manuscript known as the Profeta Cinque (Fifth Prophet) which was written in apparently unbreakable code. They succeeded, and discovered that the manuscript referenced proteins, nucleotides and amino acids – advanced genetics apparently ahead of its time. Lehman and Michaux assumed they were being tested, and presented their findings to a committee. The project was shut down and they were sent back to their everyday lives.

Meanwhile, Renée Rienne's father, Luc Goursaud, was involved in another part of the project, as a test subject for clinical trials administered by Doctor Aldo Desantis. He was paid an impressive amount of money. It is unknown what he was tested for, but it is known that thirty years later, Desantis emerged from a cryogenic chamber looking identical to Renée's father. It is likely that Prophet Five experimented on Renée's father to develop experimental genetic doubling techniques, possibly based on Lehman and Michaux's findings from the manuscript. Renée's father somehow discovered something about the experiments that disturbed him, and he fled with his daughter across Europe, only to be taken away by Desantis. Renée witnessed this and swore revenge.

A few weeks after Lehman and Michaux shut down the project, Michaux contacted Lehman. He had begun to notice that those who they were told had worked on the project were starting to die in mysterious accidents. He would then change his name and go into hiding (as Bill Vaughn) and urge Lehman to do the same.

According to Irina Derevko most assumed Prophet Five to be a myth and discounted its existence, but around the time of the events occurring in Sovogda rumors arose that Prophet Five was real and had gone active once again. The group pursued the Horizon.

The key to finding this Rambaldi device lay with old SD-6 files. Prophet Five kidnapped and hypnotized Sydney Bristow, believing she had the knowledge from SD-6 that would aid in recovering the device. Sydney gave them fake coordinates, but her mother Irina tricked her into taking them to the real location of the Horizon, a safety deposit box in Vancouver. Irina betrayed Prophet Five and disappeared with the Horizon. Prophet Five's endgame also revolved around 15th century prophet Milo Rambaldi, specifically his interest in Sydney, whom Rambaldi refers to as his "Chosen One." Ultimately, Prophet Five's endgame remains a mystery, as the Twelve were slaughtered by Kelly Peyton on Sloane's orders. Since Irina and Sloane were apparently after immortality, it may be assumed the Twelve were after the secret as well.

=== Structure and organization ===
Prophet Five was led by a group of twelve, remarkably similar to the Alliance. In addition, the Shed operated similarly to SD-6, with most agents believing they were part of a black ops division of the CIA. Members have ties to British MI6, Russian SVR, French Intelligence, the Centers for Disease Control, pharmaceutical companies, and even the CIA. Prophet Five also had some connection with the government of North Korea, as Doctor Desantis was transported to a North Korean military facility after escaping Renée Rienne. Members of the Twelve controlled entire sectors of technology, finance, and defense. When Arvin Sloane is summoned to meet the twelve in Minsk, the twelve consist of 11 men and one woman.

=== Personnel ===
==== Known aliases of the Twelve ====
- Y. Olnocvhev
- S. Danforth
- M. Aidarov
- D. Chivers
- G. Borrell Jr.
- E. Jacobs
- R. C Chadra
- PJ Pudeel
- R. Archibold III
- H. Coburn
- M. Spratt
- U. Hildaggo

(These names are from a type-written list found among the material on Prophet Five assembled by Michael Vaughn's father. It is unknown whether these are the original Twelve, the current Twelve or some combination of past and current members.)

==== Known associates ====
- Doctor Burris
- CIA Senior Officer Davenport
- Gordon Dean
- Doctor Aldo Desantis
- Anna Espinosa
- Kheel (first name unrevealed; confirmed as one of the Twelve)
- McMullen (first name unrevealed; confirmed as one of the Twelve)
- Kelly Peyton
- Julian Sark
- Arvin Sloane

==== Former associates ====
- Irina Derevko (allied in some manner for a brief period of time)
- Rachel Gibson
- Luc Goursaud (Renée Rienne's father)
- James Lehman
- Bill Vaughn (Michael Vaughn's father)
