= Rambaldi =

Rambaldi is an Italian surname. Notable people with the surname include:

- Benvenuto Rambaldi da Imola (1320–1388), Italian scholar and historian
- Carlo Rambaldi (1925–2012), Italian special effects artist
- Carlo Antonio Rambaldi (1680–1717), Italian painter
- Francesco Rambaldi (born 1999), Italian chess grandmaster
- Giulia Rambaldi Guidasci (born 1986), Italian water polo player
- Julien Rambaldi, French film director
- Milo Rambaldi, a character from the TV series Alias
