= Eric Weiss =

- Alias character
- Greg Grunberg as Eric Weiss
- First appearance: "Truth Be Told" (episode 1.01)
- Last appearance: "S.O.S." (episode 5.10)
- Portrayed by: Greg Grunberg

In-universe information
- Alias: Retriever
- Gender: Male
- Title: Agent Eric Weiss
- Occupation: NSC Covert Operations Coordinator; APO field agent CIA field agent
- Relatives: Unnamed brother (Mentioned in 3.06)
- Nationality: American

Eric Weiss is a fictional character, played by Greg Grunberg, from the television series Alias. He is one of Sydney Bristow's CIA co-workers.

== Character biography ==
Eric Weiss was a field agent at the CIA. He is a friend of most of the people at the CIA and often gives advice to the other characters, as an outside observer to all of the personal goings-on at the CIA. Weiss has a wry and sarcastic sense of humor which often comes out in his observations. He often walks into or defuses tense situations between Sydney and Vaughn. He is a descendant of Harry Houdini (whose real name was Ehrich Weiss [or Weisz]).

He initially served as a humorous foil and sounding board for Michael Vaughn in the first season, but with the integration of the former members of SD-6 and the CIA, he gives advice to many of the other characters, including Sydney and Marshall Flinkman.

When Marshall's fiancée, Carrie Bowman, went into labor at CIA headquarters, she insisted on being married before the baby was born. Marshall quickly accessed the website for the dubious "Internet Church of Mammals" and obtained for Weiss the post of "Exalted Minister", which allowed him to officiate at the impromptu wedding.

Weiss has played ice hockey in goal against Vaughn but really seems to like bowling (4.05 Liberty Village) because of the cheesy disco music, glow in the dark pins and all you can eat hot dogs after ten. He loves food, Sydney once commented the looked great and he said he'd given up all the food he enjoyed.

Weiss was the only member of Sydney's CIA "family" who wasn't recruited into the black-ops division of the CIA, dubbed "APO," at the start of the fourth season, but this was soon rectified when he learned of the existence of APO during a mission in the third episode of the season.

Although there was the potential of a relationship beginning with Sydney Bristow during the third season, nothing developed. They were just good friends, Weiss gave Sydney a third edition Alice in Wonderland to try to make up for the loss of all her stuff in her apartment fire at the end of the second season. At the start of the fourth season, Weiss began a relationship with Sydney's half-sister, Nadia Santos. In the second episode of season 4, upon meeting Nadia for the first time, he introduced himself as 38 and single.

In the second episode of the fifth season: "...1..." Eric Weiss was offered a job coordinating covert operations for the NSC, which was only a "few steps from the President"; at the end of the episode Weiss accepted the promotion and left the series. The character returned one final time in "S.O.S." when he used his high ranking position to extract a team of APO agents who had infiltrated CIA headquarters in Langley, Virginia.

In one episode he is heard speaking Dutch while on the telephone. He also speaks Spanish, French, and Russian but not as well as other field agents.
