= Jack Bristow =

- Alias character
- First appearance: "Truth Be Told" (episode 1.01)
- Last appearance: "All the Time in the World" (episode 5.17)
- Portrayed by: Victor Garber

In-universe information
- Aliases: Black Bird, Raptor
- Gender: Male
- Title(s): Agent Number 30401-00800; USS-CI-30401-2300682
- Occupation: Alliance of Twelve; SD-6 Director of Operations, CIA senior officer, Director of CIA Los Angeles Branch (briefly); APO Deputy Director; ID-CLASS
- Spouse: Irina Derevko
- Children: Sydney Bristow (daughter)
- Relatives: Nadia Santos (stepdaughter); Michael Vaughn (son-in-law); Isabelle Vaughn (granddaughter); Jack Vaughn (grandson); Elena Derevko (sister-in-law); Katya Derevko (sister-in-law)
- Nationality: Canadian

Jonathan "Jack" Donahue Bristow, played by Victor Garber, is a fictional character of the ABC television series Alias. He is the father of the central character Sydney Bristow, played by Jennifer Garner.

For playing the character, Garber received critical acclaim and three consecutive nominations for the Primetime Emmy Award for Outstanding Supporting Actor in a Drama Series, among other accolades.

== Character biography ==
Jack Bristow, a longtime agent of the CIA and former double officer with SD-6, is often emotionally distant and can be among the show's coldest and most brutal characters. However, his character's defining trait is his devotion to the safety of his daughter, Sydney. He is highly protective of her and is willing to do anything - torture, kill, even betray his country - to ensure her well-being. His relationship with his daughter has always been problematic, although it warmed and matured as the show unfolded. According to background information provided in the official Alias magazine, Jack Bristow is originally from Canada (reflecting the fact that actor Victor Garber is Canadian). A screenshot in a fourth-season episode showed a laptop referring to his birth in London, Ontario. Jack's granddaughter Isabelle was also born in Canada, on a mission in Vancouver.

Prior to the events of the series, Jack fathered Sydney with Irina Derevko, a long-term KGB spy who married Jack to get close to the CIA, specifically to steal the details of Project Christmas, which Jack was developing for the Agency. She took the name Laura Bristow and built a cover as an English literature professor. Once the FBI started to investigate against Irina, she faked her death in a staged car accident. Jack, suspected of being complicit in Irina's espionage, was detained and placed in solitary confinement. He named Arvin and Emily Sloane as Sydney's guardians. Jack and Arvin became friends after they got to know each other in the early seventies, when both started their careers at the CIA. When Jack was finally cleared, he began drinking heavily and became more of an absentee father, leaving Sydney to be raised by nannies. About ten years later, Jack was recruited into SD-6 by Sloane when the Alliance of Twelve was founded, and was one of the few agents who knew the truth behind the cell. He was also Director of Operations at SD-6, and many in the Alliance believed he was a logical choice to take Sloane's place.

When Sydney was in college, Arvin Sloane had her recruited into SD-6 without Jack's knowledge. Jack reacted negatively to Sydney's telling him that she had gotten a job at Credit Dauphine, the front company for SD-6. However, Jack's reaction made Sydney more determined to be a part of the "CIA". Jack later revealed to Sydney that he had recognized her potential, but wanted to keep her away from this life, away from making the choices that he had to and eventually she had to as an agent. Sydney's recruitment into SD-6 also ended Jack's friendship with Sloane, although, because of the clandestine nature of Jack's work as a double-agent at SD-6, he couldn't reveal that to Sloane until years after.

Several years later when Sydney herself becomes a double agent for the real CIA, she discovers that her father has long been in the same position and they learn to work together to bring down SD-6. Jack often used his position as Sloane's chief of operations to structure missions to the CIA's advantage. When Irina Derevko makes her reappearance in Season 2, Jack must also deal with his unresolved feelings of love and bitterness towards her while continuing to perform his job at SD-6 and the CIA. With SD-6's destruction, Jack found himself finally able to grow closer to his daughter.

Sydney learns in season 2 that Jack subjected her to Project Christmas, a project that trained and hardwired potential spies. Sydney initially believed that this programming had taken away her choices in life, but in Season 3 discovers that it had, in fact, protected her autonomy and made her immune to brainwashing by the Covenant. During Sydney's two year disappearance between Seasons 2 and 3, Jack was again taken into custody, held in solitary confinement for a year because of his working with unsanctioned sources (including Irina) to learn the truth behind Sydney's apparent death. During Season 3, Jack acts as a far more supportive father-figure to Sydney, in response to her depression and emotional isolation during that season.

At the start of Season 4, Sydney learns that Jack killed Irina. Even though he did it because Irina had hired a hit man to kill Sydney, his action causes yet another rift to form between Jack and his daughter, a rift aggravated when both agents are recruited by Sloane into the new CIA black ops agency, Authorized Personnel Only (APO). By the second half of the season, this rift has begun to heal.

Jack Bristow contracts radiation poisoning during the events of the fourth-season episode "Nightingale" when he entered a radioactive area in order to save Sydney's life during a mission. He initially keeps his condition a secret from his APO colleagues except for Marshall (who figures it out and confronts Jack, although Marshall later revealed it to Sydney). Bristow is seen consulting with a doctor who tells him the condition is terminal. Not accepting this prognosis, Jack begins a painful regimen of blood filtering treatments in order to delay the inevitable, and appeared to be experiencing memory loss related to medication; he is also puzzled by the appearance of a mysterious implant in his hand, which his doctor said was designed to regulate the anti-radiation medication.

Jack's doctor and indeed his entire treatment regimen turn out to be hallucinations, and that Jack, his mind affected by the radiation, had been injecting himself with a poison. Further investigation by APO reveals that the hallucinated doctor actually exists. He was a scientist who had developed an experimental treatment for radiation sickness. In the early 1980s, Jack had helped the man escape to Scandinavia. Sydney impersonates Irina to get Jack to reveal the doctor's whereabouts; the man is located and begins a genuine treatment regimen for Jack. During the impersonation, Sydney learned that her father had planned to leave the CIA in order to be a better parent to her and would have done so if her mother had not been revealed as a KGB agent. This did much to assuage Sydney's longstanding concerns about her importance in her father's life.

Jack learns near the end of the fourth season that he had not in fact killed Irina, but had shot a genetically engineered impostor. He subsequently reunited with Irina, who chastised him for being so quick to rush to judgment about her, yet also said that she understood why he had acted to protect Sydney. Following Irina's help in foiling the end game of her sister Elena, Jack decides to let Irina go rather than return her to federal prison. Husband and wife parted with a kiss.

In Season 5, Sydney is expecting her first child. In the absence of Michael Vaughn, the child's father, Jack attends doctor's visits with Sydney and helps her to assemble a crib for his grandchild's nursery. However, he is distracted by the presence of Arvin Sloane within APO, a presence he (as the new director of the black ops unit) has authorized; Sloane's behavior appears dishonest, and although Sloane has admitted some of his lies, Jack remains on his guard.

Jack becomes a grandfather when Irina and he assist Sydney in delivering her daughter, Isabelle.

In the final episode, Jack, Vaughn (recently returned from hiding) and Sydney mount an assault on Rambaldi's tomb in Mongolia where Sloane is in the process of activating The Horizon. Jack and Vaughn are captured by Sark, and when Sydney refuses to surrender The Horizon, Sloane shoots Jack. In retaliation, Sydney shoots Sloane, apparently to death.

Critically wounded, Jack is taken outside and insists that Sydney leave him and go to Hong Kong in order to stop the final player in Rambaldi's endgame - Irina - and his daughter reluctantly obeys. Later, he somehow obtains a belt of explosives and struggles back into the tomb, where Sloane, who has apparently become immortal, has been revived. Telling Sloane, "You beat death, Arvin. But you couldn't beat me", Jack detonates the explosives, killing himself, sealing the tomb and burying Sloane alive.

The episode ends with a flash forward in which Sydney and Vaughn, several years in the future, have named their second child Jack in his honor.

== Reception ==
In 2004, TV Guide ranked him # 29 on its "50 Greatest TV Dads of All Time" list.
