= Michael Vaughn (Alias) =

- Alias character
- First appearance: "Truth Be Told" (episode 1.01)
- Last appearance: "All the Time in the World" (episode 5.17)
- Portrayed by: Michael Vartan

In-universe information
- Aliases: André Micheaux (birth name); BoyScout (seasons 1–3); Shotgun (seasons 4–5)
- Nickname: Vaughn
- Gender: Male
- Title: Agent Michael Vaughn
- Occupation: CIA field agent APO field agent
- Spouses: Lauren Reed; Sydney Bristow
- Children: Isabelle Vaughn (daughter, with Sydney); Jack Vaughn (son, with Sydney)
- Relatives: Deloreme Vaughn (mother); William Vaughn (father); Jack Bristow (father-in-law); Irina Derevko (mother-in-law); Nadia Santos (sister-in-law)
- Nationality: American

Michael C. Vaughn is a fictional character on the television series Alias. Played by Michael Vartan, Vaughn is one of Sydney Bristow's co-workers and her ongoing love interest. He, like Sydney, is skilled in a variety of areas. His language abilities, shown in various episodes, include French, Spanish, Italian, and others.

Throughout the first three seasons, his code name was BoyScout; from season four on, it was Shotgun. In season five, Vaughn's birth name was revealed to be André Micheaux. His relationship with Sydney was included in TV Guide's list of the best TV couples of all time.

== Character biography ==
Michael Vaughn was originally Sydney Bristow's handler while she was working as a double agent for the CIA within SD-6. But gradually, the two agents developed romantic feelings for each other as they worked closely together to bring down this corrupt espionage organization. This did little to endear him to Sydney's father Jack Bristow, another double agent within SD-6. Vaughn and Sydney's relationship became openly intimate after SD-6 was destroyed during the show's second season. When Sydney was apparently killed in a fire a few months later, a heartbroken Vaughn left the CIA and found work as a French teacher. He also became involved with NSC liaison Lauren Reed and married her some time during Sydney's two-year disappearance. Once he discovered that Sydney was still alive, Vaughn returned to the CIA and quickly saw his feelings for her reignite, a fact that caused a great deal of tension in his marriage to Lauren. Eventually, it was revealed that Lauren was a double agent for The Covenant and that Lauren seduced him in order to gain information on Sydney.

Vaughn became obsessed with her capture and was even encouraged by Jack Bristow to kill her. He eventually captures Lauren and she tells him that she fell in love with him, but then Sydney came back and he didn't need her anymore. She also claimed that the Covenant hadn't been in contact with her for two years by that point. Her 'confession' is ambiguous as she does appear to have developed feelings for Vaughn, as is evident by her reaction to Sark's earlier observation that it killed her when Michael dropped his gun, which was trained on her, to save Sydney. He plans to douse her in hydrochloric acid but is thwarted by Katya Derevko. Despite this, he ends up killing her at the end of the third season. This act continued to haunt him into the fourth season even though he shot Lauren to prevent her from killing Sydney.

Following Lauren's demise (and between the third and fourth seasons), Vaughn appeared to go into an emotional tailspin that culminated with him setting fire to his own house. He went through a month of psych evaluations before informing his best friend and fellow agent Eric Weiss of his resignation from the CIA. In reality, Vaughn had been recruited into a black ops division of the CIA called Authorized Personnel Only (APO), along with Sydney, Jack, and Marcus Dixon (Weiss and Marshall Flinkman would soon follow). One of his new duties was to keep an eye on Arvin Sloane, who had been appointed director of APO despite his long history of criminal activities as the head of SD-6. Vaughn successfully resumed his romantic relationship with Sydney during their first mission for APO.

The first season established that Michael Vaughn's father was one of several CIA agents killed in the line of duty by Irina Derevko, Sydney's mother. Bill Vaughn's death was questioned in season four after Vaughn found a journal apparently written by his father with entries dated three years after his death in 1979. Vaughn's subsequent investigation led him to conduct a secret mission in collaboration with Sydney; he turned rogue by the end of the episode "Nightingale". However, he returned to APO after discovering his father really was dead and that the journal entries had been part of a ruse devised by Elena Derevko. At the end of the fourth season Vaughn proposed to Sydney and the two took their long-delayed vacation to Santa Barbara. During this car ride he confessed that his real name was not Michael Vaughn and implied that his first allegiance was not to the CIA. The season, however, ended in a car crash that cut his explanation short. In the premiere of season 5, Vaughn is taken by an armed group from the crash site. He is thought to be a traitor when he is recovered, and reveals his real name as André Michaux; his father was actually a mathematician associated with a group known as Prophet Five. Seven years ago, he had been approached by a woman named Renée Rienne, whose father worked with Vaughn's at Prophet Five, and has since worked with her to uncover more information about the group. At the end of the episode, he is shot by a rogue agent disguised as a CIA executive. Shortly before this, he learned that Sydney was pregnant with his child.

At the end of episode "Maternal Instinct" (#5.11), it is revealed that Vaughn is still alive in Bhutan living with monks connected to the outside world. One monk informs him that Sydney gave birth to their daughter. Afterwards, in the episode "There's Only One Sydney Bristow" (#5.12), it is revealed that both Sydney and Jack Bristow know that Vaughn is still alive. In the episode "I See Dead People (#5.14) the information is revealed only to the other members of the APO team when they recover a chip from within Renée Rienne and Vaughn is forced out of hiding by Anna Espinosa, who is posing as Sydney. Vaughn and the disguised Espinosa find that Vaughn had a chip similar to the one inside Renée, his father claiming that the scar was from a bike accident. The chip leads them to an abandoned bunker beneath a German park. While Espinosa held hostage the clerk of the jewelry store that leads to the bunker, Vaughn breaks into it. Just as he finds the bunker, Espinosa attempts to shoot him, but finds that Vaughn knew of the deception and gave her an unloaded gun. In the ensuing scuffle, just as Espinosa attempts to shoot him with a new gun, the real Sydney sneaks up behind her and shoots her. Reunited with Sydney, Vaughn returns to Los Angeles and meets his daughter, Isabelle.

In the next episode, it is revealed that Jack told Vaughn while he was in the hospital that Prophet Five would stop at nothing to silence him, and that Vaughn was in no position to fight back. Jack gave Vaughn sodium morphate, a drug that slows the heart to mimic death, and Vaughn's body was picked up by one of Jack's contacts and he was shipped off to Nepal.

In the series finale, Vaughn participates in a wide variety of missions to bring about the fall of Prophet Five, Sloane and Irina. At the very end of the final episode a flash forward reveals that Sydney and Vaughn are married and semi-retired. They have a second child, Jack (named after Sydney's father).
