= Irina Derevko =

- Alias character
- Lena Olin as Irina Derevko
- First appearance: "Snowman" (episode 1.19)
- Last appearance: "All the Time in the World" (episode 5.17)
- Portrayed by: Lena Olin (full character); Arabella Holzbog (photograph); Kate Anthony (voice, in a video clip); Natasha Pavlovich (visual, in that video clip); Angela DéAwn (Young Irina/Sydney photograph); April Webster (once walks up to Sydney)

In-universe information
- Aliases: Laura Bristow, The Man
- Gender: Female
- Occupation: KGB field agent; Prophet Five partner; Head of her own organization
- Spouse: Jack Bristow
- Children: Sydney Bristow (daughter with Jack Bristow); Nadia Santos (daughter with Arvin Sloane)
- Relatives: Elena Derevko (sister); Katya Derevko (sister); Isabelle Vaughn (granddaughter); Jack Vaughn (grandson); Michael Vaughn (son-in-law)
- Nationality: Russian

Irina Derevko (Russian: Ирина Деревко) is a fictional character on the television series Alias, and a main character during the second season of the series. Irina, played by Lena Olin, is the mother of the central character, Sydney Bristow.

== Biography ==
Her mother was alive and also the mysterious criminal overlord known up to that point only as "The Man".

Derevko turned herself in to the CIA early in season two. She provided information to help bring down the SD-6, and assisted with other important missions. Jack, predicting that Irina would betray them, framed her for providing false information about a mission in Madagascar. The CIA planned to execute her. Agent Michael Vaughn learned the truth and helped Sydney stop her mother's execution. Later, during a mission in Panama, Irina did betray the CIA and joined forces with Arvin Sloane and Sark.

Her subsequent whereabouts were unknown throughout season three, although she continued to be in occasional contact with Jack via Internet Relay Chat. She arranged for her sister, Katya Derevko, to assist Jack and Sydney on occasion. It was also learned that Irina had had an affair with Arvin Sloane and had a second daughter, Nadia Santos.

At the beginning of season four, Sydney learned that Irina had hired a hit man to kill her. Jack Bristow received permission from his superiors to execute Irina, and in "Another Mr. Sloane" he states that he carried out the act himself. Sydney, unaware that Irina had ordered her death, later identified Irina's body in a Moscow medical facility and arranged for her burial in a Moscow crypt.

In the fourth season episode "Ice", Nadia discovers a photograph of Irina holding a baby. Jack tells her that Irina told him that she had a niece. This niece preceded Sydney and was supposedly why Irina wanted a baby of her own. When Sydney was born Irina held her as she had the baby in the photo. No further information regarding the actual identity of the infant was ever presented and neither of the other Derevko sisters ever mentioned having a baby. Elena specifically said (in "Before The Flood") that she never wanted children. Jack presumes that the photo was just another ruse by Irina to mislead him.

The shooting of Irina occurred 18 months prior to the season four finale and sometime prior to season three's finale, "Resurrection". The fourth season finale revealed that a genetic modification procedure known as Project Helix was used to create a double of Irina, and it is this woman whom Jack shot dead. The attempt on Sydney's life was placed by Irina's other sister, Elena Derevko, to mislead Jack into thinking he had killed his wife. The woman who underwent the genetic therapy was an agent of The Covenant, Elena's own criminal organization, who had volunteered to take Irina's place and be assassinated.

The real Irina was imprisoned by Elena and tortured for her knowledge of Rambaldi's secrets. After 18 months, she was rescued by her daughters (she had not seen Nadia since her birth) and Jack. Although technically under arrest by the CIA, Irina was given permission to help stop Elena from completing her plans. After the successful completion of the mission, Jack and Sydney allowed her to escape rather than return to America and imprisonment.

During the fifth season, it is revealed that Irina is involved to an unknown extent in the Prophet Five organization. Irina is seen observing Sydney's interrogation under hypnosis at the end of the episode "The Horizon". It is revealed she had Kelly Peyton kidnap Sydney to recover information about the Horizon, a Rambaldi artifact that would grant its wielder immortality. After Sydney appears to reveal the code crucial to her abductors' attempts to find the Horizon, Irina tells Peyton to make Sydney comfortable and leaves the observation room. In the episode "Maternal Instinct" she reunites briefly with Sydney and Jack, during which they discover her affiliation with Prophet Five and Irina also indicates that she gave the order to kill Michael Vaughn. She also tells Sydney that she never wanted to have children, and that she only did so on orders from the KGB. After helping Sydney deliver her baby (during an attack by Kelly Peyton), Irina disappears again.

Irina finally met her demise in Hong Kong in the series finale. She retrieves the Horizon, which she had traded to Sloane for a pair of missiles, through Kelly Peyton. She ordered Sark to launch the missiles at Washington, D.C., and London. Jack assumed that Sloane wanted to use the missiles not to simply destroy areas with high population densities, but to profit from the reconstruction. Sydney tracked her down and learned that Irina sought the same immortality that Sloane had apparently found. Sydney and Irina battled a final time, precariously balanced on a skylight. Choosing to grab the Horizon rather than her daughter's hand, Irina fell through the skylight to her death.

== Portrayal ==
Besides Lena Olin, several other actresses portrayed Irina in the course of the series:

- Arabella Holzbog portrayed Irina/Laura Bristow in a photograph Sydney kept
- Kate Anthony was the voice of Irina Derevko in the video clip shown in episode 1.19, "Snowman"
- Natasha Pavlovich is the woman actually seen as Irina Derevko in that video clip
- April Webster played Irina when she walks up to Sydney at the end of episode 1.22, "Almost Thirty Years"
- Mía Maestro portrayed Irina/Laura in a photograph seen in episode 4.4, "Ice"
- Angela DéAwn portrayed Irina Derevko in a photograph with Sydney Bristow

== Sisters ==
=== Katya Derevko ===
Yekatarina "Katya" Derevko, played by Isabella Rossellini, was the first of Irina's sisters to be announced. She first appeared in the third season to assist Jack and Sydney, but later revealed herself to be allied with The Covenant and was taken into federal custody. In season four she again helped Sydney and Jack to defeat Elena's endgame in exchange for a promise from Jack to work for a pardon and release for her.

=== Elena Derevko ===
Considered the most ruthless of the three Derevko sisters, Elena Derevko, portrayed by Sônia Braga, is first mentioned by Jack Bristow when he meets with Katya during the third season. She is a pivotal part of the fourth season, with her actions significantly affecting the lives of her nieces Sydney and Nadia.
