= Marcus Dixon (Alias) =

- Alias character
- Carl Lumbly as Marcus Dixon
- First appearance: "Truth Be Told" (episode 1.01)
- Last appearance: "All the Time in the World" (episode 5.17)
- Portrayed by: Carl Lumbly

In-universe information
- Alias: Outrigger
- Nickname: Dixon
- Gender: Male
- Title: Director of Joint Taskforce (LA)
- Occupation: SD-6 field agent CIA field agent APO field agent
- Spouse: Diane Dixon
- Children: Robin Dixon (daughter); Steven Dixon (son)
- Nationality: American

Marcus R. Dixon is a fictional character on the television series, Alias. He has been one of Sydney Bristow's coworkers and the CIA's Director of Joint Task Force. He is portrayed by Carl Lumbly.

== Character biography ==
Marcus Dixon is an intelligent and strong career agent. He is fluent in nine languages and has other notable specialties that include cryptology, linguistics, financial analysis, and Kung-Fu. He is generally level-headed and very keen to the many issues that he must resolve as a leader within the CIA. However, Dixon can be very emotional when his family or loved ones are involved, going so far as to act against orders to protect them. His code name in APO is "Outrigger."

== Storylines ==
=== Season 1 ===
Before being recruited to SD-6 by Jack Bristow, Dixon was a member of the Recon Marines. At SD-6, Dixon was Sydney Bristow's partner on missions, but unlike Sydney, Dixon was unaware that SD-6 was not actually a covert branch of the CIA. Several times during the first season, Dixon questioned Sydney's loyalties, perceiving actions she took to be against the U.S. government, when in fact the opposite was true. His cover was that of an investment analyst for Credit Dauphine, a corporate bank in downtown Los Angeles.

=== Season 2 ===
Dixon eventually learned the truth about SD-6 after Sydney's latest mission resulted in them acquiring access to the Alliance server, including the access codes to all twelve SD bases; needing to confirm that the current codes were valid, but with Jack Bristow exposed and captured while Sydney's cover was compromised, she was forced to tell Dixon the truth as the only other agent in SD-6 that she could trust.

Following the downfall of SD-6 and his resentment at Sydney for not apparently trusting him, Dixon was pressured by his wife Diane who was now angered by the many years of lies from her husband. He initially felt compelled not to take a position within the CIA. However, following Sydney's capture, Vaughn persuades him to help save Sydney as Dixon was the only person to have successfully infiltrated the location where she was captured, and eventually he decides to join the CIA. However, he initially finds that he does not wish to make her worry about him coming home at night, and decides to request at transfer to intelligence, which would mean a desk job in analysis.

This changes when Dixon's wife is killed in a car bomb explosion as a retaliatory measure by Arvin Sloane for Dixon's accidental shooting of Sloane's wife, Emily, on what would have been his last CIA field mission. Initially suicidal over the loss, Dixon eventually channels his grief into his field work. Dixon's two children, Robin and Steven, were once kidnapped by The Covenant in an attempt to forcefully extract an artifact created by eccentric 15th century inventor, Milo Rambaldi.

=== Season 3 ===
During the two years between Seasons 2 and 3 (when Sydney went missing), Dixon was promoted to the CIA Director of Joint Task Force, the head of the office where Sydney works. Dixon was one of only a few people who knew that Sydney was alive during that time.

=== Season 4 ===
At the start of the fourth season, Dixon had stepped down as director and resumed duties as a field agent alongside Sydney in the new Authorized Personnel Only (APO) black ops division of the CIA. He became involved in an (initially) clandestine relationship with CIA Director Chase. During pursuit of Arvin Sloane and Elena Derevko, he was shot and seriously wounded by Elena and was absent from the season finale, presumably recovering in the hospital from his wounds. Both his injury and his relationship with Chase appeared to have been forgotten by the start of the fifth season.

=== Season 5 ===
Dixon continued to act as a field agent with APO throughout Season 5, although he tended to spend more time in support roles rather than as an active field agent. In the series finale, a flash forward several years into the future reveals that Dixon has again taken a promotion to the position of Deputy Director (although it is not explicitly stated that APO still exists). He has maintained a close relationship with Vaughn and Sydney. Their daughter Isabelle calls him "Uncle Dixon" (continuing her mother's habit of referring even to men she loves by their last names).
