= List of Alias characters =

Roles in the ABC spy fiction series

The following is a partial list of characters from the TV series Alias.

== Overview ==
=== Main characters ===
Actor	Character	Seasons				
Actor	Character	1	2	3	4	5
Jennifer Garner	Sydney Bristow	Main	Main	Main	Main	Main
Ron Rifkin	Arvin Sloane	Main	Main	Main	Main	Main
Michael Vartan (Note: Vartan was credited as a main cast member in the season 5 premiere, and then as a Special guest star in his later appearances in the season.)	Michael Vaughn	Main	Main	Main	Main	Main
Bradley Cooper	Will Tippin	Main	Main	Special Guest		Special Guest
Merrin Dungey	Francie Calfo / Allison Doren	Main	Main	Recurring		Special Guest
Carl Lumbly	Marcus Dixon	Main	Main	Main	Main	Main
Kevin Weisman	Marshall Flinkman	Main	Main	Main	Main	Main
Victor Garber	Jack Bristow	Main	Main	Main	Main	Main
David Anders	Julian Sark	Recurring	Main	Main	Special Guest	Recurring
Lena Olin	Irina Derevko	Stand-in	Main		Special Guest	Recurring
Greg Grunberg	Eric Weiss	Recurring	Recurring	Main	Main	Recurring
Melissa George	Lauren Reed			Main	Special Guest	
Mía Maestro	Nadia Santos			Recurring	Main	Recurring
Rachel Nichols	Rachel Gibson					Main
Balthazar Getty	Thomas Grace					Main
Élodie Bouchez	Renée Rienne					Main
Amy Acker	Kelly Peyton					Main

=== Recurring characters ===
Actor	Character	Seasons				
Actor	Character	1	2	3	4	5
Angus Scrimm	Calvin McCullough	Recurring	Recurring		Guest	
Ric Young	Dr. Zhang Lee	Recurring	Recurring	Guest		
Evan Parke	Charlie Bernard	Recurring				
Sarah Shahi	Jenny	Recurring				
Gina Torres	Anna Espinosa	Recurring			Recurring	Guest
Yvonne Farrow	Diane Dixon	Recurring	Recurring			
James Handy	CIA Director Arthur Devlin	Recurring	Recurring			Guest
Joey Slotnick	Steven Haladki	Recurring				
Patricia Wettig	Dr. Judy Barnett	Recurring	Recurring	Recurring		
Amy Irving	Emily Sloane	Recurring	Recurring		Guest	
Terry O'Quinn	FBI Assistant Director Kendall	Guest	Recurring	Guest		
Amanda Foreman	Carrie Bowman		Guest	Recurring	Guest	Guest
Kurt Fuller	NSC Director Robert Lindsey			Recurring		
Mark Bramhall	Andrian Lazarey			Recurring		
Isabella Rossellini	Katya Derevko			Recurring	Recurring	
Angela Bassett	CIA Director Hayden Chase				Recurring	
Sônia Braga	Elena Derevko				Recurring	
Tyrees Allen	Gordon Dean					Recurring

== McKenas Cole ==
McKenas Cole
- Alias character
- Portrayed by: Quentin Tarantino

In-universe information
- Gender: Male
- Title(s): Lieutenant under Elena Derevko, directing activity at various global cells
- Occupation: SD-6 "The Man"; The Covenant
- Relatives: None

McKenas Cole was portrayed by Quentin Tarantino. Formerly an operative for SD-6, he defected from the organization, first to work for "The Man", and later to assume a leading position in The Covenant.

Cole first appears in the season one episodes "The Box" (Parts I and II). He and a group of agents infiltrate the SD-6 office in Los Angeles and take the entire cell hostage with the exception of Sydney and Jack Bristow, who were in the parking garage of the Credit Dauphine building at the time. It is revealed that he is a former SD-6 agent who was tasked by Arvin Sloane to destroy a pipeline in Chechnya five years prior, but was captured and tortured by rebels. He is ultimately released and becomes an agent for the crime syndicate operated by "The Man," later revealed to be Irina Derevko, and he tries to procure a vial of liquid from the vault of SD-6 in order to expose the ink of a document written by Milo Rambaldi. However, after valiant efforts by the Bristows and CIA agent Michael Vaughn, he is apprehended and taken into custody by the United States government.

He next appears in the season three episode "After Six." After Julian Sark and Lauren Reed kill the six leaders of the Covenant cells, they attempt to use this as leverage in order to ascend to more powerful positions within the terrorist organization. To the chagrin of Sark, Lauren went behind his back and alerted Cole of Sark's intentions. However, this was of value to Cole and the Covenant, because the CIA was currently looking for a document called The Doleac Agenda that specifies the most important information about the Covenant's operations, including the cell leaders' names. Thus Sark's actions, while a betrayal, were beneficial to the Covenant and Cole promoted Sark and Lauren as co-commanders of the North American cell of the Covenant.

Cole also oversaw a demonstration of Sydney's apparent brainwashing as Julia Thorne.

Cole's current whereabouts and how he escaped from CIA custody are unknown.

== Gordon Dean ==
Gordon Dean
- Alias character
- Portrayed by: Tyrees Allen

In-universe information
- Gender: Male
- Occupation: CIA unknown (rogue agent); Leader of The Shed
- Relatives: None

Gordon Dean was portrayed by Tyrees Allen.

Dean was the head of The Shed, a clandestine criminal organization similar to SD-6. As at SD-6, most of the operatives of the Shed believed they were working for a black ops division of the Central Intelligence Agency. Apparently only Dean and his associate Kelly Peyton knew the truth, that the Shed was actually a division of Prophet Five.

Dean initially appeared in the first episode of season 5, claiming to be with the CIA's Office of Special Investigations. He claimed to be investigating Michael Vaughn as a double agent, however, APO quickly determined Dean was a rogue agent. He had faked his death two years earlier and had since then been living "off the grid."

When Shed operative Rachel Gibson learned the Shed's actual affiliation, she turned on it and at the behest of APO and Sydney stole the data from the Shed's servers. When Dean discovered what she was doing he destroyed the Shed, killing everyone except Peyton and Gibson.

Following the destruction of the Shed, Dean and Peyton undertook a series of attempts to recover or kill Gibson, with no success. Dean was instrumental in securing the release of Arvin Sloane from federal custody and getting Sloane's security clearance reinstated so Sloane could work for Dean inside APO. He had an undetermined connection to Sloane prior to this.

Eventually Dean was captured by Gibson and taken into APO custody. While in custody Sloane murdered him at the behest of Peyton who, with Dean's death, took control of his operations.

== Elena Derevko ==
Elena Derevko
- Alias character
- Sônia Braga as Elena Derevko
- First appearance: The Orphan (episode 4.12)
- Last appearance: Before The Flood (episode 4.22)
- Portrayed by: Sônia Braga

In-universe information
- Alias: Sophie Vargas
- Gender: Female
- Title: Leader
- Occupation: The Covenant
- Relatives: Irina Derevko (sister) (deceased); Katya Derevko (sister); Jack Bristow (brother-in-law) (deceased); Sydney Bristow (Niece); Nadia Santos (Niece) (deceased); Isabelle Vaughn (great-niece); Jack Vaughn (great-nephew)
- Nationality: Russian

Elena Derevko was played by Sônia Braga.

Elena is the sister of Irina and Katya Derevko and was one of the KGB's foremost assassins, responsible for the murder of countless diplomats and politicians throughout Eastern Europe. She was described by her sister Irina as "volatile and quick-tempered". Considered the most ruthless of the Derevko sisters, Elena is the secret leader of The Covenant. She was first mentioned in the season three episode "Crossings" by Jack. She is not referenced again until the fourth season, when in "Welcome to Liberty Village" it is revealed that an unidentified Russian group is trying to find her.

Thirty years before Season 4, Elena disappeared and could not be found, even by Irina and around a year before Season 4, Arvin Sloane and Jack Bristow had been investigating Elena's whereabouts until Jack received a message from an old associate that led him to one of Elena's safehouses in Warsaw. Inside was detailed information on the lives of Sydney Bristow and Nadia Santos, her nieces, with evidence suggesting she had them under surveillance for at least a decade.

Soon Nadia's former caretaker Sophia Vargas arrived in Los Angeles claiming that her reason for coming to the United States was due to an attack by an unidentified group at her home in Lisbon, Portugal. They quickly assumed Elena was the responsible behind the attack, not realising that she was in fact "Sophia".

Under the alias of "Sophia Vargas", Elena used her former connection to Nadia to stay with her and Sydney to monitor their work for the CIA. She also monitored Nadia's conversations through a necklace equipped with a microphone.

She later hacked into Nadia's laptop and requested to move the Hydrosek, a deadly weapon, to an unsecured location away from APO. Elena and her associate Avian then stole the weapon before Nadia and Weiss could stop them, not realizing who the thief was.

In order to complete her endgame, Elena, fully aware of the fact that he would at some point double-cross her, also ordered the creation of "Arvin Clone", a corporal in the U.S. Army named Ned Bolger, who was captured and brainwashed to believe that he was, in fact Arvin Sloane, committing numerous criminal acts in the process, such as setting Irina up to appear as if she had contracted an assassin to kill Sydney.

Elena sent a team into the Department of Special Research to steal all the Rambaldi artifacts necessary to complete "Rambaldi's endgame". On the same night, she left Sydney and Nadia's house, saying that she had been informed by the Lisbon police that it was safe for her to return. Hours later, Hayden Chase entered the house and accused Nadia of working against the government and allowing the team to break into the DSR. It was at this point that Jack and Sloane began to realize that Sophia was Elena, which was backed by the microphone found in the necklace given to Nadia by Sophia.

Sloane deduced that Elena would go to Lazlo Drake with the Rambaldi artifacts. Sydney and Sloane went to meet him, but he was already dead. Sydney found a hidden camera and rewound the feed to see Elena talking with Drake. Before she could see where they planned to take the Rambaldi artifacts, Sloane tranquillized her and left. He met up with Elena in her office in Prague and offered his services to help complete her task. Jack discovered through Katya Derevko that The Covenant was a major terrorist organization set up by Elena in order to secretly acquire Rambaldi artifacts.

Dixon, Nadia and Sydney were sent on a mission to stop them. Dixon found Elena and Sloane, but Elena shot him before he could react. While in the hospital, Dixon told Sydney that he saw Irina Derevko before Elena shot him. It was discovered that Elena had used Project Helix to create a double of Irina, then through the use of "Arvin Clone" set up a hit on Sydney, sparking the events that led to the double's execution - to ultimately lead the intelligence/criminal world to believe that she was dead. The double was described as being an ardent follower of Elena Derevko, and fully aware of the fact that she was being set up to die.

The real Irina, however, was imprisoned by Elena, and tortured for her knowledge of a Rambaldi prophecy known as "Il Diluvio", the Flood. She was kept for eighteenth months in Prague, but moved to a remote location in Guatemala - Tikal. Sydney, Jack and Nadia located her through Lucian Nisard, and saved her from Elena's guards.

Elena and Sloane constructed a massive Mueller device over the Russian city of Sovogda which, in conjunction with the tainted water supply from The Orchid, infected the people of Sovogda and made them extremely aggressive. When Sloane learned that APO had sent a team into the city to stop them, he offered to head out with the team himself. While he was doing this, Elena began to transmit a subaudible frequency via the Russian mil-sat network to spread the infection worldwide. The second that the bombers were scheduled to destroy Sovogda, the frequency would be broadcast causing the effects of Sovogda to occur worldwide.

One of Elena's men found Nadia walking around the streets and brought her to Elena, who told Nadia that she never wanted to hurt her. She said that she always thought of Nadia as her daughter, then offered her a place alongside her. She showed Nadia a map of the world with pinpoints all over it, saying "the flood has begun, just a few will survive." Nadia refused to join her, saying that she would never kill Sydney as Rambaldi's prophecy had stated. Elena then injected Nadia with the tainted water, which infected her with the aim of forcing her to kill Sydney.

Elena noticed Sloane on the monitor. He was back and carrying a supposedly unconscious Vaughn, but as soon as they arrived in the base they began to shoot Elena's men. They were joined by Jack and Irina. They got to Elena and Irina knocked her to the floor with her gun. Sloane put Elena in a chair and Jack and Vaughn went to the computers to stop the mil-sat network from uploading the frequency. However, they could not retract the transmission. Elena told them that she had planned the attack for five years; it would not be that simple to stop her. Sydney managed to get into the main circuit board, but found a blue and a white wire. Irina did not know which to cut, and she asked Elena. When she refused to answer, she told Jack to start torturing her. Before he could do so, Elena told him to stop, and said to cut the white wire. Irina immediately shot Elena on the head and told Sydney to cut the blue wire.

=== Elena's Past with Nadia ===
Sydney and Vaughn discover footage of a very young Nadia being tested with Rambaldi fluid in a Russian bunker. Katya Derevko tells them Nadia was born to Irina in a Soviet prison after Irina left Jack. Sydney was born in 1975 and Irina left in late 1981. This means Nadia has to have been born in 1982. The footage proves Nadia was in Soviet custody for at least the first few years of her life. Conservatively, based on the footage, she could have been in Soviet hands until at least 1985.

Elena, as Sophia Vargas, tells Michael Vaughn the only time she met his father Bill was when he left Nadia in her care at the orphanage in Buenos Aires. However, Michael Vaughn locates Sophia's address in Lisbon through an encoded entry in a journal purported to have belonged to his father, which indicated Bill Vaughn had survived past 1979, when Irina Derevko was supposed to have killed him. Since this journal was revealed a forgery, there is no reason to believe information given by Elena supporting the authenticity of the journal was true.

Nadia ran away from the orphanage in 1992. The footage is fairly dark but it is possible she was as young as 10 when she ran away. She's in a dormitory with other girls of about that age. She's recruited by Roberto Fox when she's 17 or 18, which would make the year 1999 or 2000. She dies in circa 2007.

In this timeline, the only loose ends are how Nadia ended up at the orphanage in the first place and why the mercenary Roberts would tell Michael Vaughn his father was involved. Since the orphanage was headed up by Elena Derevko, the most obvious explanation is that Elena kidnapped her after she was taken from Irina and she simply lied to Vaughn about his father's involvement, and Roberts was paid to do the same.

== Katya Derevko ==
Yekaterina Derevko
- Alias character
- Isabella Rossellini
- First appearance: Crossings (episode 3.12)
- Last appearance: The Descent (episode 4.20)
- Portrayed by: Isabella Rossellini

In-universe information
- Alias: Black Sparrow
- Nickname: Katya
- Gender: Female
- Title: Colonel
- Occupation: Colonel, SVR; The Covenant
- Relatives: Irina Derevko (sister) (deceased); Elena Derevko (sister) (deceased); Sydney Bristow (niece); Nadia Santos (niece) (deceased); Isabelle Vaughn (great-niece); Jack Vaughn (great-nephew); Jack Bristow (brother-in-law) (deceased)

Yekaterina "Katya" Derevko, alias the Black Sparrow, was the second of the three Derevko sisters to be introduced. She was played by Isabella Rossellini.

Katya first appeared during the third season, sent by Irina in response to Jack's request for help in extricating Sydney and Vaughn from a North Korean prison. Following the mission, Katya kisses Jack passionately.

In the course of searching for The Passenger after her abduction in season 3, Sydney and Vaughn discover video files of Nadia as a small child in an abandoned Russian military bunker, formerly the center of Soviet Rambaldi research. Katya and several Russian guards confront them, but Katya turns on the guards, subduing them with tranquilizer darts, and the three of them travel to St. Petersburg. Katya fills them in on Nadia's background, claiming that Nadia was born to Irina in a Russian prison after Irina left Jack. Since Sydney was born in April 1975 and Irina left Jack in late 1981, Nadia must have been born in 1982. This timeline is irreconcilable with reports that Vaughn's father had rescued Nadia as a young girl, since he was killed by Irina in 1979, confirming the belief that Elena Derevko had fabricated the story of Bill Vaughn's involvement. Katya and Jack work together to trace Sloane's movements through bank activity, and Katya flirts outrageously with Jack. Jack initially rebuffs her advances but later kisses her deeply.

After Nadia's rescue, Vaughn tracks down his wife, Lauren Reed. He has captured her, beaten her, and is about to kill her when Katya intervenes, stabbing Vaughn in the back and releasing Lauren. While engaged in reconnaissance of a Covenant operation in Palermo, Sydney encounters Katya again. Katya attempts to shoot her (thereby confirming to Sydney that Katya is allied with the Covenant), but Sydney had removed the bullets from Katya's gun. Sydney hits Katya with a tranquilizer dart and Katya is taken into federal custody.

Nothing is seen of Katya until Nadia visits her in prison in season 4, seeking to learn more about the mother Nadia never knew. Katya eats some chocolate Nadia brought her, triggering a near-fatal allergic reaction to illustrate her desperation to meet with Sydney. Sydney visits Katya in the prison infirmary to warn her against continuing to see Nadia. Katya tells her that she never intended to harm Sydney in Palermo, and Irina never intended to harm Sydney either. Irina had tried to contact Katya, concerned someone was setting her up. Katya asks Sydney to retrieve the message from Irina, which is contained in a music box. Sydney retrieves the box and recovers the message, which leads her to bank records in the name of Arvin. Sydney informs Katya that the records exonerate Irina and implicate Sloane (it was later discovered that Sloane's imposter, a pawn of Elena Derevko, was behind it).

After Elena's raid on the Department of Special Research and with Katya being the only Derevko he has access to, Jack visits her in prison seeking information on the whereabouts and operations of Elena. In exchange, he promises to do everything in his power to secure her release. Katya tells him Elena was the true power behind the Covenant and advises him that Elena's base of operations is in Prague, but only Irina knew Elena's full endgame and how to stop it.

Whether Jack was successful in securing Katya's release is unknown, and no further information regarding her current status is extant.

== Anna Espinosa ==
Anna Espinosa
- Alias character
- Portrayed by: Gina Torres/Jennifer Garner

In-universe information
- Gender: Female
- Title(s): Go-to officer for Wetworks and Active Measures while at K-Directorate
- Occupation: KGB field agent K-Directorate field agent The Magnific Order of Rambaldi; Prophet Five field agent
- Relatives: none

Anna Espinosa was initially played by Gina Torres. Born in Cuba but raised in Russia, Anna was a Soviet spy at some point, until the collapse of the Soviet Union. She is a devout follower of Rambaldi, as evidenced by the eye tattoo on her hand, and as such is one of the many characters obsessed with carrying on the late prophet's work, though her appearances on the show are scant compared to the other zealots.

In season one, Espinosa is a ruthless and persistent nemesis to Sydney while the latter goes on missions for SD-6. She worked for K-Directorate, a rival organization of SD-6, composed of former operatives from the Eastern bloc, and was the go-to officer for Wetworks and Active Measures, until The Man, aka Irina Derevko, took down the organization and seized control of its assets. Upon the fall of the organization, Anna staged her death and went freelance, selling her skills as an agent to the highest bidder.

She is not seen again until the fourth season, under the employ of the Cadmus Revolutionary Front (an organization believed to be composed of former Covenant operatives until it is revealed the organization is still alive under Elena Derevko). She is tasked to steal a chemical bomb but instead eliminates CRF's leader upon retrieving it. She rescues Julian Sark and plans to sell the bomb, but Sark betrays her and she is captured by Sydney. She is thereupon taken into federal custody.

She returned for the 100th episode of the series, entitled "There's Only One Sydney Bristow". Prophet Five, using its government contacts, was able to secure her release. She then kidnaps Will in an attempt to blackmail Sydney. She is able to obtain Page 47 of the Rambaldi prophecy, depicting the Chosen One, a woman bearing Sydney's likeness. At the end of the episode, possibly using Project Helix, the controlling elements of Prophet Five genetically transformed Espinosa into Sydney's double after the latter's DNA was sampled by Prophet Five. At this point Jennifer Garner took over the portrayal of the character.

The first encounter APO personnel had with the transformed Anna occurred in Ghana in the episode "30 Seconds" and resulted in her killing freelance operative Renée Rienne before escaping. In the following episode ("I See Dead People"), Anna is ordered to intercept the real Sydney, who is en route to contact Michael Vaughn. Anna tries to deceive Vaughn, but he realizes she is an imposter, though he does not know her true identity. They fight, but as Anna gains the upper hand, she is shot in the back and head by Sydney, who had just arrived at the scene. Sydney subsequently impersonates Anna within Prophet Five for a brief time, initially convincing Sloane she (Anna) had killed Sydney by shooting her in the back. Sloane conspired to kill Anna as he felt Sydney did not deserve to die that way, but subsequently realized Sydney was impersonating her, first by doubts as Sloane notices the passion behind how Sydney (impersonating Anna) talks to him and later confirmed when Sydney told Sloane "I don't die that easy" inside a prison cell after Sydney meets with The Rose. Apparently, Prophet Five considered Anna either disposable or too dangerous to their plans to keep alive, as they planned to kill her once she fulfilled her duties foreseen by Rambaldi as the Chosen One (namely retrieving an artifact from San Cielo).

== Thomas Grace ==
Thomas Grace
- Alias character
- Balthazar Getty as Thomas Grace
- First appearance: "...1..." (episode 5.02)
- Last appearance: "Reprisal" (episode 5.16)
- Portrayed by: Balthazar Getty

In-universe information
- Alias: Sidewinder
- Gender: Male
- Occupation: APO field agent
- Relatives: Amanda Grace (spouse, deceased)

Thomas Grace was portrayed by Balthazar Getty.

The character was introduced in the second episode of the fifth season. Thomas Grace is recruited into Authorized Personnel Only, a black-ops division of the CIA, in order to replace agent Michael Vaughn after Vaughn is supposedly killed (he also replaces Eric Weiss after Weiss transfers out of APO). This led to friction between Grace and Vaughn's partner and fiancée, Sydney. Grace also bonded with another new APO recruit, Rachel Gibson, and began training the novice agent to fight.

Not much is known about the character's background, although his file, details unknown, caused many a person to halt and reconsider welcoming him into APO with open arms. In The Horizon, Marshall Flinkman discovers that Grace used to be married, though he initially believes it is a remnant from an undercover assignment. Grace reacts with anger at Marshall's nosiness.

In S.O.S, Grace takes part in an APO mission to infiltrate CIA headquarters in Langley, Virginia in order to locate Sydney, who has been kidnapped by Prophet Five. During the mission, he takes advantage of the opportunity to obtain information from the Witness Protection Program regarding the man who, it is revealed, murdered Grace's wife Amanda. Later, Grace tracks the man down, but instead of killing him, asks to be put in touch with someone called "The Cardinal." His "off-book" mission does not go unnoticed, as Rachel discovers Grace's investigation. Grace, in response, lies to her and says he intended to kill the man, but was unable to do so once he saw that he had started a family of his own.

In No Hard Feelings, Rachel discovers the truth: The Cardinal is the man who ordered the death of Grace's wife and the man he had pursued was the hit man assigned to do the job. The hit man agrees to tell Grace why his wife was targeted, in return for his vehicle which had been impounded by the government. Upon returning the vehicle to the hit man, he is told that Amanda was simply "in the wrong place at the wrong time" and that the intent was actually to kill Grace. The hit man then drives off in his vehicle, only to die when Grace detonates a bomb inside. The identity of "The Cardinal" and why he had targeted Grace for assassination is never revealed.

In the penultimate episode of Alias, Grace is sent to defuse a bomb that Sark had placed onto a subway to destroy APO headquarters. Unable to defuse the bomb, he repeatedly sprays liquid nitrogen on it, which slows down the mechanism for a short period of time but does not disable it. He is instructed to leave when the timer gets to 60 seconds, but ultimately stays with the bomb beyond the one-minute threshold in order to keep it from going off. His last words are to Rachel Gibson, telling her that he wished they had more time because he would have asked her out. Starting to cry, Rachel responds that she would have said yes just as the bomb detonates, killing Grace.

== Assistant Director Kendall ==
Kendall
- Alias character
- First appearance: "Q&A" (episode 1.17)
- Last appearance: "Full Disclosure" (episode 3.11)
- Portrayed by: Terry O'Quinn

In-universe information
- Gender: Male
- Title: Director of top-secret DSR installation Project Black Hole
- Occupation: Department of Special Research
- Relatives: None

Assistant Director Kendall was played by Terry O'Quinn.

He first appeared in the first season as the head of an FBI tribunal brought in from Washington DC to interrogate Sydney after she is arrested following evidence linking her to a prophecy by 15th century prophet Milo Rambaldi which suggests she could be a national security risk to the United States. Kendall questions her on every aspect of her life, until she is broken out of FBI custody.

Kendall then reappeared in the second episode of season two, assuming command of a joint FBI/CIA task force working to bring down criminal organization the Alliance and primarily, their SD-6 cell, though his reappearance coincided specifically with the surrender of Irina Derevko to the CIA. He immediately became a source of antagonism for the characters with his no-nonsense, by the book approach. The character effectively became a second season regular, appearing in almost every episode, although almost nothing was learned about him (to this day his first name remains a mystery) and he was mainly a source of exposition.

Following the two year time jump between the end of season two and beginning of the third season, Kendall was replaced as head of the task force by Marcus Dixon, though later reappeared again midway through the season when he met secretly with Sydney and informed her of the truth: he was never an FBI Assistant Director as he claimed, and had in fact always been affiliated with the Department of Special Research (DSR). He ran their facility in Nevada, Project Black Hole, which held everything the US government had collected on Rambaldi. He informs Sydney about what happened during the two years she was missing, and how they overcame their past differences and formed a friendship. The episode is Kendall's last appearance in the series.

== Alexander Khasinau ==
Alexander Khasinau
- Alias character
- Portrayed by: Derrick O'Connor

In-universe information
- Gender: Male
- Title: second-in-command of Derevko's organization
- Occupation: KGB, Irina Derevko's criminal organization
- Relatives: None

Alexander Khasinau was played by Derrick O'Connor.

Alexander Khasinau is second-in-command of a criminal organization headed by a mysterious figure known as "The Man." Julian Sark, who undertakes a number of missions on behalf of this organization, reports to Khasinau, leading SD-6 to believe that Khasinau is "The Man." Khasinau owns a nightclub in Paris which serves as a front for his criminal activities.

Following a raid on SD-6 headquarters, led by McKenas Cole, who says his employer is "The Man", Arvin Sloane seeks a declaration of war by the Alliance of Twelve on Khasinau. In an attempt to secure the swing vote of SD-9 leader Edward Poole, Sloane assassinates fellow SD cell leader Jean Briault at his behest, after Poole shows Sloane evidence of Briault's complicity with Khasinau. When Poole still votes against war, Sloane realizes that Poole framed Briault and manipulated him into the assassination. Poole is the one actually in league with Khasinau.

Sloane tells Sydney that following the disappearance of Sydney's mother, Irina Derevko, Sloane served on a commission that investigated her activities. He states that Khasinau had been Irina's superior at the KGB. In a later episode, videotape footage of Irina shows her stating that Khasinau actually recruited her.

Khasinau, through his mole in the CIA, FBI agent Steven Haladki, learns that Sydney Bristow is a double agent for the CIA. He uses this knowledge to formulate a plan to expose SD-6 by feeding information to Sydney's reporter friend Will Tippin. When Tippin, at the urging of Jack, mentions "The Circumference," Khasinau has Tippin come to Paris and has him interrogated under sodium pentathol. Tippin is rescued by Sydney, who is in Paris with Marcus Dixon to retrieve a Rambaldi document from Khasinau's office.

Khasinau arranges for Tippin to be kidnapped by Sark from a CIA safehouse, transported to Taipei and tortured by an evil dentist for more information about the Circumference. Tippin knows nothing about it other than the name. Ironically, it turns out that Khasinau already had the Circumference and didn't realize it. It is the Rambaldi document that SD-6 had previously retrieved from his office. Jack trades the Circumference to Sark to secure Tippin's release.

In the season 1 finale, Khasinau reveals to Sydney that he is not "The Man." "The Man" is in fact Sydney's mother, Irina. It is unclear how widespread the knowledge that Khasinau is not the leader is within the organization. Khasinau is apparently able to inspire fanatical devotion among some members of the organization. Haladki, once exposed by Jack as a double agent, entreats Jack to join with Khasinau, saying Khasinau is "the future."

Khasinau is killed by Irina early in Season 2 in the course of a mission to retrieve "the Bible," a book containing the protocols of Irina's criminal organization.

== Andrian Lazarey ==
Andrian Lazarey
- Alias character
- First appearance: Season 2
- Last appearance: Season 2
- Portrayed by: Mark Bramhall

In-universe information
- Gender: Male
- Occupation: Magnific Order of Rambaldi; Russian diplomatic corps
- Relatives: Julian Sark (son)
- Nationality: Russian

Andrian Lazarey was played by Mark Bramhall.

Andrian Lazarey was a Russian diplomat. He was the father of Julian Sark, a descendant of the Romanovs and a member of the Magnific Order of Rambaldi. He was first seen in a videotape in the season 3 premiere episode, the apparent victim of an assassination by Sydney. Sydney had been missing for almost two years, and the only record she had of that time was the tape.

With Lazarey's apparent death, his fortune of $800,000,000 in gold bullion passed to Sark. Sark was in CIA custody, and a shadowy organization known as The Covenant sprang him in exchange for seizing that fortune. Lauren Reed, an agent of the National Security Council and the wife of Michael Vaughn, was assigned to learn the identity of Lazarey's murderer.

As Sydney continued to search for clues to her missing two years, she deciphered a coded message that had been left in a penthouse in Rome, Italy. The message was a set of coordinates which led her and Jack to a box buried in the California desert. The box contained a severed hand marked with the Eye of Rambaldi. Tests determined that it belonged to Lazarey and the time since it was severed proved that Sydney did not kill Lazarey.

In an attempt to recover her memories, Sydney submitted herself to a chemical procedure and received a number of cryptic visions. One repeating image was the name "St. Aidan" and the image of her friend Will Tippin, who was currently in the Witness Protection Program. (Conscious)

Sydney contacted Will and learned that St. Aiden was the name of one of the contacts he'd cultivated during his time as a CIA analyst. Will contacted St. Aidan, who turned out to be Lazarey. Lazarey gave him information that led them to a Rambaldi artifact, a sample of Rambaldi's DNA. Lazarey was captured by the Covenant during that meeting and tortured by Sark for the information he had given Will and Sydney. ("Remnants")

FBI Assistant Director Kendall finally filled Sydney in on her lost time. She had been captured by The Covenant and conditioned to be an assassin operating under the name Julia Thorne. Because of her Project Christmas conditioning, the Covenant was unsuccessful. Sydney operated within The Covenant as a double agent. She was tasked to find out from Lazarey the location of the Rambaldi cube containing the DNA sample and then kill him. Instead, Sydney and Lazarey faked his death and searched for the cube under the auspices of the CIA.

Together they located the cube in the Fish River Gorge in Namibia. They recovered the cube from the vault in which it was housed but Lazarey became trapped, necessitating the severing of his hand by Sydney to free him. Per Lazarey's agreement with the CIA, he vanished.

Sydney learned that the Covenant planned to combine the Rambaldi DNA sample with her eggs to create the "second coming" of Rambaldi. Horrified, she hid the DNA sample and had her memory wiped so that the Covenant could not use her to locate it.

The CIA undertook a mission to recover the genetic material, although Sydney decided to destroy it instead. The CIA team recovered Lazarey from Covenant custody. He was transported to a hospital and while in transit asked Sydney if she knew about "The Passenger." Before Lazarey could reveal any additional information about The Passenger, he was assassinated by Lauren, a double agent for the Covenant. (Full Disclosure)

== Dr. Zhang Lee ==
Dr. Zhang Lee
- Alias character
- Portrayed by: Ric Young

In-universe information
- Gender: Male
- Occupation: KGB; FTL; Irina Derevko's organization
- Relatives: None

Dr. Zhang Lee was played by Ric Young.

Lee is a torturer, always remaining eerily calm and distant from the pain he inflicts. He was always seen wearing a suit and glasses, which led to his being referred to by the nickname "Suit 'N' Glasses" before his name was finally revealed in the third season.

Lee first appeared in the pilot episode, Truth Be Told. He tortured Sydney by extracting a molar, trying to find out who her employer was. Sydney was eventually able to escape after stabbing him with his own equipment. He returned in the first-season finale, Almost Thirty Years, this time to find out what Will Tippin knew about a Rambaldi artifact known as The Circumference. Lee used a truth serum that was known to cause paralysis in 1 in 5 recipients, after which he determined that Tippin knew nothing and could be released. Tippin subsequently turned the serum on Lee, screaming, "One in five, you little bitch!". While Tippin was not paralyzed as a result of receiving the serum, Lee was not so fortunate.

He resurfaced in the season two episode A Higher Echelon, now in an electric wheelchair. His new victim was Marshall Flinkman, who he threatened with an epoxy that would expand, harden, and puncture his organs when ingested. Marshall seemed to cave under the threat and agreed to reconstruct a computer program for him. However, this was simply to buy time for Sydney to rescue him and Lee was left empty-handed again, though this time he got away with only being kicked out of his chair.

In the third-season episode Legacy, Lee was discovered to have been in charge of the Soviet Union's Rambaldi research in the early 1980s, including overseeing experiments on Sydney's sister Nadia Santos. Whether he was a follower of Milo Rambaldi or he was simply following orders is unknown. Sydney and Michael Vaughn tracked him down and captured him. Now in a position of no power at all, his calm demeanor evaporated and he became a terrified, sobbing wreck. When he was unable to give any pertinent information, Vaughn poured a powerfully corrosive liquid over his unfeeling legs and then the rest of his body. Lee made no further appearances so his final fate is unknown.

== Milo Rambaldi ==
Milo Giacomo Rambaldi is a historical personage. The work of Rambaldi, often centuries ahead of its time and tied to prophecy, plays a central role in the show.

According to Alias creator J. J. Abrams, in a feature on Rambaldi included on the season 5 DVD box set, the Mueller device and Milo Rambaldi were originally intended simply to be MacGuffins.

Rambaldi's technological developments are sought after by numerous governments and rogue organizations in the series. Arvin Sloane is generally obsessed with obtaining Rambaldi's work and unlocking its secrets.

There seems to be no limit to Rambaldi's genius; he was highly adept in automatism, life extension, protein engineering, mathematics, cryptography and cartography. Rambaldi is said to have predicted the digital Information Age. He invented a machine code language around 1489, cryptographic algorithms, and sketched the designs of a portable vocal communicator and a prototype that reflected the properties of a transistor.

The character draws its inspiration from real-life historical figures including Leonardo da Vinci and Nostradamus. Rambaldi's artistic-looking manuscripts, written in code, are a direct reference to Leonardo's method of recording his work.

The Rambaldi subplot, which dominated the first two seasons of the series and was greatly explored in the second half of the third season, was virtually nonexistent in the early episodes of season four. However, it continued to lurk in the background of the series and, as series creator J. J. Abrams promised, resurfaced in full later in the season. Rambaldi and his works continued to figure heavily through the end of the series, forming a major plot point of the finale.

=== Fictional biography ===
Rambaldi (1444–1496), an artist, alchemist, engineer, mystic, and renaissance man in the vein of Da Vinci, served as chief architect to Pope Alexander VI.

Rambaldi was born in Parma, educated by Vespertine monks, and worked as a student of the arts until he was 12. During his travels to Rome when he was 18, he met Cardinal Rodericus of Borgia (Borja) and was later retained privately as an architect, consultant and prophet when Rodericus became Pope in 1492.

His writings and plans are written in multiple languages ranging from Italian and Demotic hybrids to elusive mixtures of symbols (pre-masonic cipher encryptions). Rambaldi also created the earliest known watermark which he used on all of his documents: a naked eye, visible only when viewed under black light, known as the eye of Rambaldi, which helped distinguish original works from forgeries many years later. His waterpapers were all handmade from a unique polymer fiber.

Despite Borgia's benevolence, Rambaldi and his works never became famous due to Archdeacon Claudio Vespertini, who feared the revolutionary implications of the technologies defined in Rambaldi's belief system: Rambaldi believed that science would someday allow us to know God. Vespertini attempted to pursue and destroy everything he could find and keep the name of Rambaldi "invisible".

When Alexander VI died in 1503, Vespertini ordered that the name Rambaldi be erased from all inscriptions between 1470 and 1496 and his workshop in Rome destroyed. Rambaldi himself was excommunicated for heresy and sentenced to death by flame. However, Rambaldi died in the winter of 1496, a lonely man without a known surviving heir.

Not long after his death, a second workshop was discovered in San Lazzaro and was destroyed by the Vatican. Plans and sketches were sold and traded as if without value during a private auction. These plans were later located, starting in the 15th century and continuing to recent years, around Italy, France, Eastern Europe and the former Soviet Union. Plans were also found in private collections and museum warehouses. During the Third Reich, documents interpreting his designs and teachings were highly sought after. It was during this time that the nickname Nostravinci arose among auctioneering circles. The design directive for many of these drawings remains unclear to this day and has inspired some impressive forgeries, even prime examples of digital piracy. However the eye of Rambaldi was proven to be the only accurate method to identify genuine artifacts.

=== Symbol ===
The symbol <o>, generally referred to as the "Eye of Rambaldi," is the symbol of The Magnific Order of Rambaldi. In the episode Time Will Tell, a direct descendant of Giovanni Donato (who may, in fact, have been Donato himself) describes the Order as "Rambaldi's most trusted followers, entrusted with safeguarding his creations. Sadly, like most things that once were pure, criminals now use this symbol to infiltrate the Order." Some followers of Rambaldi have the mark tattooed on their hands, including Anna Espinosa.

The glyph is also said by Irina Derevko to represent the struggle between "The Chosen One" and "The Passenger", whom Irina believes to be her two daughters. (See Rambaldi's prophecies below.) The circle in the center of the design is said to be the object around which they will do great battle.

The Eye appears in one frame of the Alias title sequence (seasons 1-3) after all the letters in the word Alias appear. In season one and three, it flashes as ALIAS is spelled out and Victor Garber's credit appears. In season two, it appears on ALIAS when "With Lena Olin" appears. Season four doesn't have a Rambaldi sign, but it appears in season five when Balthazar Getty appears.

=== Rambaldi's prophecies ===
Sydney is eventually rescued before her cover as a CIA agent is blown and she tries to disprove the prophecy refers to her by climbing Mt. Subasio and see the sky.

After Sydney removed the chances of her being 'The Chosen One', she realized that if she managed to fool the police, couldn't her mother have done the same? Eventually the Department of Special Research refocused their efforts on trying to track down Sydney's mother, Irina Derevko, after it was revealed she was still alive.

In the season two finale, Irina reveals that Sydney is actually Rambaldi's Chosen One, and not Irina as Sydney wanted to believe and that Sydney is the only one capable of stopping Sloane.

Sydney prevented this by destroying the lab where the procedure was underway.

When FBI Assistant Director Kendall tells Sydney the truth about the two years she was missing, he mentions that she's a celebrity among the Department of Special Research as she was the one to collect the most part of Rambaldi's works.

During Season Three (Episode 20), another prophecy was revealed to Michael Vaughn.

Elena Derevko put in motion her scheme to destroy civilization using the contaminated water in conjunction with a giant Mueller device. Nadia becomes infected with the contaminated water.

As predicted by Rambaldi, "The Chosen One" and "The Passenger" clashed over the Mueller device, and Sydney would have been killed if not for Arvin Sloane's intervention when he was forced to shoot Nadia when she began strangling Sydney. Sydney then destroyed the Mueller device and Nadia is left in a coma.

In Season Five, it is revealed that page 47 holds a secret message, which is briefly shown when Nadia after being cured tries to burn the page to prevent her father from finding it, which as predicted in the prophecy, results in Nadia's death. Arvin Sloane eventually translates the message which reads:

The circle will be complete when the Chosen One finds The Rose in San Chielo.

Prophet Five, using its government contacts, was able to secure Anna Espinosa's release and later was able to genetically transform Espinosa into Sydney's double after the latter's DNA was sampled by Prophet Five. Sydney discovers Anna's impersonation and kills her, then begins impersonating Anna within Prophet Five.

Sydney is sent to Italy where she is approached by Sark at a betting parlor. Believing Sydney to be Anna, he explains that the former San Chielo monastery is now the La Fossa prison. After faking a robbery, Sark and Sydney surrender to the police and are taken to La Fossa. Sark fakes an illness and is taken to the infirmary, where he fights off the guards and accesses the security system to open the door to Sydney's cell. Sydney finds the basement, where an old man says that he has been waiting for her for a very long time. He indicates that he knows she's the real Sydney and quotes the message from page 47 and says that he is "The Rose". He then shows Sydney a wall where a drawing similar to the one on page 47 was painted, and gives her an amulet before declaring ominously and prophetically that "it is only a matter of time until the stars fall from the sky, until the end of light".

In the finale of Season Five, it is revealed that Sydney had misinterpreted the part of the prophecy that refers to "the beauty of my sky". Arvin Sloane shoots the ice under Sydney to prevent her (and the audience) of seeing a specific pattern on the wall inside Mt. Subasio when the rising sunlight seeps into the cavern and filters through the amulet that Sydney recovered from the Rose.

=== Rambaldi's endgame ===
As revealed in the final three episodes of season four, the first part of Rambaldi's endgame was the Mueller Device (which could be used to change human nature to hatred or peace, depending on the desire of the possessor, as wanted). The second part of the endgame was The Horizon (immortality), as revealed at the end of season five. Together, they would result in the possessor living forever and, with the help of the Mueller Device, changing the world the way they see fit for all eternity. However, this was averted when all known Mueller Devices were destroyed and Sloane, the only known beneficiary of The Horizon, was trapped in Rambaldi's own tomb by an explosion, left to exist but never be free for all eternity.

== Emily Sloane ==
Emily Sloane
- Alias character
- First appearance: "Page 47" (episode 1.15)
- Last appearance: "...In Dreams" (episode 4.19)
- Portrayed by: Amy Irving

In-universe information
- Gender: Female
- Occupation: State Department
- Relatives: Arvin Sloane (husband); Jacqueline Sloane (daughter) (deceased); Nadia Santos (stepdaughter) (deceased)

Emily Sloane was portrayed by Amy Irving.

Emily Sloane was married to SD-6 head Arvin Sloane for more than 30 years. Little is known of her life outside of her marriage to Arvin. She had worked for the State Department for several years but whether this was before or during her marriage is unknown. She was an avid gardener. She and Arvin had one child, Jacquelyn, who died in infancy. Her grief was so great that she asked Arvin never to mention their child again.

When Irina Derevko, Sydney's mother, faked her death when Sydney was six, Sydney's father, Jack, was taken into federal custody. He named Arvin and Emily as Sydney's temporary guardians. Why Sydney would later state in multiple episodes she did not meet Arvin or Emily until after she had started working for SD-6 is unknown. Sydney stated she considered Emily her real mother.

During season 1, Emily is near death from lymphoma. Sydney visits her in an SD-6 hospital, where Emily reveals she knows Arvin doesn't really work for a bank and she knows of the existence of SD-6 (although she apparently believes it is affiliated with the CIA). Under security protocols, Sydney is required to report her to SD-6 Security Section but does not. SD-6 finds her out anyway and Arvin is ordered to execute her. He pleads for a reprieve on the grounds her cancer will soon kill her anyway and his request is granted. Emily's cancer goes into total remission and Arvin is again ordered to kill her. Instead, over the end of season 1 and the beginning of season 2, he hatches an elaborate scheme to fake her death and spirits her away to an isolated island. There, he confesses to her the true nature of SD-6. Initially horrified, Emily's love for Arvin leads her to forgive him and they remain together.

With the downfall of SD-6 and the Alliance, Sloane (now an internationally wanted terrorist) tells Emily they're "free" and leads her to believe he has finally left behind his deceptions. Emily and Arvin relocate to a villa in Tuscany, but because of the possibility, they have been compromised Sloane relocates them again. Emily learns Irina, whom she knew as Laura Bristow and thought was dead, is still alive and working with her husband. Arvin tells Emily everything he's done is to assure she remains cancer-free forever.

Distraught, Emily goes to the American consulate in Florence, announces she is Sloane's wife and demands to speak to Sydney. Sydney makes contact with Emily, who tells her she won't be the excuse for Arvin's crimes. She volunteers to help bring Arvin in but demands a guarantee Arvin will not be sentenced to death.

The CIA makes the deal, and Emily returns to Tuscany wearing a wire. Unbeknownst to her, Arvin is making a deal to sell all of his assets, contacts and Rambaldi artifacts to Irina. At the last moment, after an emotional talk with Arvin, Emily switches sides again. She reveals the wire to Arvin and then disconnects it, and they attempt to escape from the CIA. Marcus Dixon, aiming for Sloane, accidentally shoots and kills Emily instead.

Emily's final appearance in the series is in a flashback in the season 4 episode In Dreams..., which is when the existence of Jacquelyn is revealed.

== Notable guest stars ==
- Edward Atterton - Dr. Danny Hecht (season 1)
- Jonathan Banks - Frederick Brandon (season 2)
- Raymond J. Barry - Senator George Reed (season 3)
- Patrick Bauchau - Dr. Aldo Desantis (season 5)
- Angela Bassett - CIA Director Hayden Chase (season 4)
- Tobin Bell - Karl Dreyer (season 1)
- Peter Berg - SD-6 Agent Noah Hicks (season 1)
- Agnes Bruckner - Kelly McNeil (season 1)
- David Carradine - Conrad (seasons 2, 3)
- David Cronenberg - Dr. Brezzel (season 3)
- Faye Dunaway - Ariana Kane (season 2)
- Griffin Dunne - Leonid Lisenker (season 3)
- Amanda Foreman - Carrie Bowman (seasons 2, 3, 4, 5)
- Vivica A. Fox - Toni Cummings (season 3)
- Kurt Fuller - NSC Director Robert Lindsey (season 3)
- Ricky Gervais - Daniel Ryan (season 3)
- Joel Grey - 'Arvin Clone'/Corporal Ned Bolger (season 4)
- John Hannah - Martin Shepard (season 1)
- Rutger Hauer - Anthony Geiger (season 2)
- James Handy - CIA Director Ben Devlin (seasons 1, 2, 5)
- Ethan Hawke - CIA Agent James L. Lennox (season 2)
- Ira Heiden - CIA Agent Rick McCarthy (season 2)
- Djimon Hounsou - Kazari Bomani (season 3)
- Aharon Ipalé - Ineni Hassan (season 1)
- James Lesure - Craig Blair (season 2)
- Richard Lewis - CIA Agent Mitchell Yeagher (season 2)
- Peggy Lipton - Olivia Reed (season 3)
- Tracy Middendorf - Elsa Caplan (season 2)
- Roger Moore - Edward Poole (season 1)
- Wolf Muser - Ramon Veloso (seasons 1, 2)
- Ken Olin - David McNeil (season 1)
- Evan Parke - Charlie Bernard (season 1)
- Richard Roundtree - Thomas Brill (season 3)
- Miguel Sandoval - Anthony Russek (season 1)
- Angus Scrimm - Calvin McCullough (seasons 1, 2, 4)
- Jason Segel - Sam Hauser (season 4)
- Sarah Shahi - Jenny (season 1)
- Christian Slater - Dr. Neil Caplan (season 2)
- Joey Slotnick - Steven Haladki (season 1)
- Justin Theroux - Simon Walker (season 3)
- Danny Trejo - Emilio Vargas (season 2)
- Patricia Wettig - Dr. Judy Barnett (seasons 1, 2, 3)
- Rick Yune - Kazu Tamazaki (season 4)
- Keone Young - Professor Choy (seasons 1, 5)
- William Wellman Jr. - Priest (season 1)
- Ravil Isyanov - Luri Karpachev (season 1, 2)
- Alexander Kuznetsov - Kazimur Scherbakov (season 1) / Assault Team Leader (season 4)
- John Aylward - Jeffrey Davenport (season 1, 5)
- Mark Rolston - Seth Lambert (season 1)
- Faran Tahir - Mokhtar (season 1)
- Bernard White - Malik Sawari (season 1)
- Jeff Chase - Sawari’s bodyguard (season 1) / Large Russian (season 4)
- Alex Veadov - K-Directorate officer (season 1) / The Chemist (season 4)
- Tom Everett - Paul Kelvin (season 1)
- Norbert Weisser - Jeroen Schiller (season 1)
- Lori Heuring - Eloise Kurtz (season 1)
- Robert Bailey Jr. - Steven Dixon (season 1)
- Tristin Mays - Robin Dixon (season 1, 3)
- Nancy Dussault - Helen Calder (season 1)
- Evgeniy Lazarev - Dr. Kreshnik (season 1)
- Maurice Godin - Fisher (season 1)
- Paul Lieber - Igor Sergei Valenko / Bentley Calder (season 1)
- James Hong - Joey (season 1)
- Derek Mears - Romanian Orderly (season 1)
- Kristof Konrad - Endo (season 1)
- Igor Jijikine - Chopper (season 1)
- James Lew - Quan Li (season 1)
- Michelle Arthur - Abigail (season 1, 2)
- Lindsay Crouse - Carson Evans (season 1)
- Castulo Guerra - Jean Briault (season 1)
- Lilyan Chauvin - Signora Ventutti (season 1)
- Stephen Spinella - Mr. Kishnell (season 1, 3) / Boyd Harkin (season 5)
- Tony Amendola - Tambor Barcelo (season 1, 2)
- Joseph Ruskin - Alain Christophe (season 1, 2)
- Amy Aquino - Virginia Kerr (season 2)
- Pasha D. Lychnikoff - Zoran Sokolov (season 2)
- Shishir Kurup - Saeed Akhtar (season 2)
- Derek de Lint - Gerard Cuvee (season 2)
- Iqbal Theba - General Arshad (season 2)
- Courtney Gains - Holden Gemler (season 2)
- Olivia d’Abo - Emma Wallace (season 2)
- Michael Enright - Antonyn Vasilly (season 2)
- Tom Urb - Ilya Shtuka (season 2)
- Robert Joy - Dr. Hans Jürgens (season 2)
- Oleg Taktarov - Gordei Volkov (season 3)
- Michael Berry Jr. - Scott Kingsley (season 3)
- Al Sapienza - Tom (season 3)
- Ilia Volok - Ushek San'ko (season 3, 4)
- Bill Bolender - Oleg Madrczyk (season 3)
- Mark Ivanir - Boris Oransky (season 3)
- Clifton Collins Jr. - Javier Parez (season 3)
- Timothy V. Murphy - Avery Russet (season 3)
- Lorenzo Caccialanza - Team Leader (season 3) / Chancellor (season 5)
- Erick Avari - Dr. Vasson (season 3)
- Pruitt Taylor Vince - Schapker (season 3)
- Erica Leerhsen - Kaya (season 3)
- Arnold Vosloo - Mr. Zisman (season 3)
- Byron Chung - Colonel Yu (season 3)
- Francois Chau - Mr. Cho (season 3)
- Randall Park - Korean Soldier (season 3)
- Stana Katic - Flight Attendant (season 3)
- Dmitri Diatchenko - Vilmos (season 3)
- Herman Sinitzyn - Petr Berezovsky (season 3)
- Geno Silva - Diego Machuca (season 3)
- Vincent Riotta - Dr. Robert Viadro (season 3)
- Morgan Weisser - Cypher (season 3)
- Glenn Morshower - Marlon Bell (season 3)
- Cotter Smith - Hank Foster (season 3)
- Rob Benedict - Brodien (season 4)
- Corey Stoll - Sasha Korjev (season 4)
- Cliff DeYoung - Connelly (season 4)
- Cullen Douglas - Jimmy (season 4)
- Victor Alfieri - Jeremiah (season 4)
- Kevin Alejandro - Cesar Martinez (season 4)
- José Zúñiga - Roberto Fox (season 4)
- Ulrich Thomsen - Ulrich Kottor (season 4)
- Elya Baskin - Dr. Josef Vlachko (season 4)
- Robin Sachs - Hans Dietrich (season 4)
- Michael K. Williams - Roberts (season 4)
- Izabella Scorupco - Sabina (season 4)
- Paul Ben-Victor - Carter (season 4)
- Vladimir Mashkov - Milos Kradic (season 4)
- Nestor Serrano - Thomas Raimes (season 4)
- Michael McKean - Dr. Atticus Liddell (season 4)
- Oz Perkins - Avian (season 4)
- Ori Pfeffer - Anthony (season 4)
- John Benjamin Hickey - Father Kampinski (season 4)
- Nick Jameson - Lazlo Drake (season 4)
- Jeff Yagher - Greyson Wells (season 4)
- Andrew Divoff - Lucian Nisard (season 4)
- Joel Bissonnette - Keach (season 5)
- Jennifer Hetrick - Sen. Diane Lewis (season 5)
- Patrick Gorman - Flashback Desantis (season 5)
- Angus Macfadyen - Joseph Ehrmann (season 5)
- Caroline Goodall - Elizabeth Powell (season 5)
- Ntare Mwine - Benjamin Masari (season 5)
- Michael Massee - Dr. Gonzalo Burris (season 5)
- Oleg Vidov - Laborer (season 5)
- Sterling K. Brown - Agent Rance (season 5)
- Navid Negahban - Foreman (season 5)
