= Alias season 5 =

Alias
- Season 5
- Season 5 DVD cover
- No. of episodes: 17

Release
- Original network: ABC
- Original release: September 29, 2005 – May 22, 2006

Season chronology
- ← Previous; Season 4

The fifth and final season of the American drama/adventure television series Alias premiered September 29, 2005, on ABC and concluded May 22, 2006, and was released on DVD in region 1 on November 21, 2006. Guest stars in season five include Gina Torres and Lena Olin.

Season 5 returned to Alias's former viewing schedule by starting in September and concluding in May. The previous season aired entirely in 2005, beginning in January and concluding in May. Between December 2005 and April 2006, the series went on hiatus due to Jennifer Garner's real-life pregnancy, which was written into the season's storyline, as well as news of the show's cancellation. Season 5 consisted of 17 episodes, including four episodes aired as a pair of double-length presentations; two aired back-to-back upon its return from hiatus, and another two aired back-to-back for the series finale.

== Cast ==
=== Main ===
- Jennifer Garner as Sydney Bristow
- Ron Rifkin as Arvin Sloane
- Carl Lumbly as Marcus Dixon
- Kevin Weisman as Marshall Flinkman
- Rachel Nichols as Rachel Gibson
- Élodie Bouchez as Renée Rienne
- Balthazar Getty as Thomas Grace
- Amy Acker as Kelly Peyton
- Victor Garber as Jack Bristow

=== Recurring ===
- Michael Vartan as Michael Vaughn
- Tyrees Allen as Gordon Dean
- Mía Maestro as Nadia Santos
- David Anders as Julian Sark
- Greg Grunberg as Eric Weiss
- Lena Olin as Irina Derevko
- Patrick Bauchau as Aldo Desantis
- Amanda Foreman as Carrie Bowman
- James Handy as Ben Devlin, the director of the CIA
- Bradley Cooper as Will Tippin
- Merrin Dungey as Francie Calfo
- Gina Torres as Anna Espinosa

== Episodes ==
No. overall	No. in season	Title	Directed by	Written by	Original release date	US viewers (millions)
89	1	"Prophet Five"	Ken Olin	Alison Schapker & Monica Breen	September 29, 2005	8.21
Sydney and Vaughn survive the crash. Sydney runs from armed EMTs; Vaughn's taken by helicopter. CIA Special Investigations officer Gordon Dean interrogates Sydney, claiming Vaughn's a double agent. Ivan Curtis threatens Sydney harm unless "Michaux" (Vaughn) decrypts a message. Vaughn fights, escapes, and calls Sydney, who misdirects Dean to Mexico City, demanding, "the truth...your name." Vaughn, "André Michaux," explaining, as a baby, his mathematician father changed their identities. "Le Corbeau" Renée Rienne enlisted Vaughn's help concerning Prophet Five. When Sydney "walked into" CIA mentioning Mueller (Prophet Five's founder), Vaughn volunteered as her handler. They meet Pentagon cryptologist James Lehman, recruited in 1972 to decode the 15th-century Profeta Cinque (The Fifth Prophet), discovering advanced genetics. Lehman went "ghost" when other recruits "accidentally" died. In Cape Town, they retrieve the book. Miranda triggers the alarm. While escaping, Dr. Parks phones; Sydney is pregnant. Imprisoned, Sloane pleads Jack for release to help revive Nadia from her coma. Rachel Gibson hacks the NSA, locating Vaughn in Italy, delivering the book to Lehman for decryption. Dean shoots Lehman. Curtis machine-guns Vaughn. Across the rail-yard, Sydney watches helplessly. Dean takes the book. Vaughn flatlines. London 4 months later : Sydney finds Renée, "We need to talk."
90	2	"...1..."	Frederick E. O. Toye	J. R. Orci	October 6, 2005	7.39
Renée claims she works as a barmaid at Henry's to find Vaughn's killers, who own it. They raid the back-office ops-center, recovering an HDD. Sydney gives Renée a cellphone for future communication. Dr. Lynn performs ultrasound, while Sydney begins to feel very much alone in her pregnancy. Jack reassures, he'll be there for her. Carrie catches Marshall helping Sydney locate Heinrich Roemer; Sloane provides additional intel. Posing as buyers, Dixon and Weiss meet Roemer, coincidentally capturing Curtis stealing a nuridium canister. Marshall discovers even more nuridium had been stolen previously. Dixon, not willing to risk a nuridium detonation equaling "Hiroshima times 50," releases and tracks Curtis. Ahern recommends Thomas Grace as Jack's APO replacement for Vaughn. Weiss informs Sydney of his D.C. promotion to coordinate NSC covert operations. Curtis phones Rachel, "Let Dean know...we have the device onboard." Dixon, Weiss and Sydney board an airliner mid-flight via Northrop B-2 Spirit. Sydney finds the "bomb" is a cryogenic case. Curtis opens the door to be sucked out to his death, evading worse fates. Sydney confirms the body stolen from DSR was not yet identified; hanging up, Renée gets a pulse from the occupant of the cryogenic chamber.
91	3	"The Shed"	Tucker Gates	Breen Frazier	October 13, 2005	7.20
In Istanbul, Kelly Peyton shoots an R&D facility guard, patching-in for card-reader hacking to steal Russian Substance 33, breaking a vial, killing Turkish scientists. Marshall believes Dean's hacker helped (after an NSA hack blew Vaughn's cover). Traced to Prague, Jack sends Marshall with Grace, who Sydney worries, operates as a "loner." They identify Red Sox baseball-cap-guy, but he's only a relay; Grace captures Rachel. Marshall stress-tests Rachel, who believes she's working CIA black-ops under Dean; exactly how Sloane used Sydney in SD-6. Sydney has Rachel trace her watch's signal; instead of Langley, it goes to Dean's office, "The Shed." Marshall gives Rachel a 240GB credit-card to access Dean's servers. In Omsk, Dixon escorts Sloane regarding infected Sovogda survivors, but there's no cure. His daughter a casualty, ex-Politburo Undersecretary Alexander Dolzhenko wants revenge; Sloane dissuades him. Sydney encourages Rachel, returning to her office not knowing patriots from criminals. Grace distracts Kelly while Rachel nervously brush-passes Sydney the card. Marshall breaches the firewall; Rachel downloads from the Shed. Kelly warns Dean; Rachel's "copying everything." Substance 33 Location: Budapest. Dean executes "Plan B," escaping. Grace pulls the fire alarm. Rachel enters the stairwell as the top floor explodes. She's battered but "OK."
92	4	"Mockingbird"	Frederick E. O. Toye	Drew Goddard	October 20, 2005	6.78
At Rue L'Or casino, Monte Carlo, Sydney and Dixon run a $900,000 craps-con to steal Dean's operations archives. Sydney's car is lifted via electromagnetic crane. Dean phones, demanding "Mockingbird," or be dropped to death, hundreds of feet. 72 hours earlier : Debriefing, Rachel reveals her "Shed" callsign, Mockingbird. Kelly requests "relocation" funds, tripping Marshall's monitors. Masquerading as BIS Agents, Sydney and Rachel search Dean's bombed-out "Shed", finding his gore-encrusted server. In George Town, First Cayman Trust emissary Pierpont holds Dixon and Grace at gunpoint, pending correct Q&A protocols. Fighting bomb-trauma, Rachel recovers responses from the bloody HDD. Kelly watches $541,378,284.88 being "cleaned out." Dean realizes Gibson survived; ECHELON intercepts his call to Laurent Moreau. Rachel helps hack casino systems to avenge her friends. Presently : It's revealed, Rachel was hidden in the trunk. Dean claims the archive's fake; he wants Gibson! Jack, Dixon, Grace and Marshall all try to help, in vain. Sydney and Rachel cling to the electromagnet; Kelly releases the car, destroying it. Meanwhile, Special Prosecutor Boyd Harkin, persuaded by Dean's asset Keach, finds "no cause for violation" of Sloan's pardon. Rachel worries she'll never be safe. Sydney vows they'll "bring 'em all down...Every single one," as Sloan walks free.
93	5	"Out of the Box"	Jay Torres	Jesse Alexander	October 27, 2005	6.55
Renée raids US Army storage, Frankfurt, for Atropine ZX. Exonerated, Sloane tries returning, trading his connections for APO resources to research Nadia's cure. In Marseille, Renée, believing the man's her father Luc Goursaud, resuscitates him. Out of the box, he claims Desantis encased him 23 years ago in 1983. Sydney, "Prophet Five?" Man, "What do you know about them?" He collapses. Jack advises Grace to contact Dr. Etienne Laurent, but mercenaries attack. In San Francisco, Dixon and Rachel tomographically image Desantis' records using Marshall's "little 6-legged freak...Charlotte." Renée explains, Desantis paid Luc for "clinical trials," later abducting him. Renee vows "to make them pay." Grace blows up the mercenaries' knockout-gas van. Dean provides Sloane photos of Senator Diane Lewis' daughter, extorting APO access. Marshall and Rachel study recovered electroencephalograms, proving the man isn't Luc. Sydney likewise deduces he's not Renée's father, but Renée needs convincing. In an armed stand-off, Renée's tests him to remember where she hid as a child when Luc was abducted; the man can't answer. Mercenaries extract him by helicopter. In Kaesong, North Korea, he's met by Dean and identified as Dr. Aldo Desantis. Sloane returns to APO, "keeping an eye on" them for Dean.
94	6	"Solo"	Jeffrey Bell	Jeffrey Bell	November 10, 2005	6.43
Rachel's family is abducted, into WITSEC. Rachel asks how "to do this alone?" Sydney, "you don't have a choice." Sloane warns, he won't hurt Rachel or APO. Dean tasks, find weapon designer János Vak's "targeting software...Lasso technology" that electronically redirects missiles mid-flight. Sydney enlists Renée in Marseille to hunt Vak's partner, Algerian arms-broker Zigza Zidane. Tom trains Rachel to "fight dirty." Renée confirms Vak's Chinese buyer. In Bombay, APO crashes General Liem Song's consulate party to steal his dossier to find Vak. Dixon distracts. For entry, Sydney bluffs the embassy guard that she'll tell his Indian fiancée her baby is Song's. Marshall and Gibson run Op-Tec. Tom helps Rachel against another guard. Sydney is surpassed Jack's sending Rachel in solo; but sequestered, only Vak's "female companionship" can infiltrate his South China Sea oil platform. Distrusting Sloan, Dean sends Kelly to "get the weapon" and kill Rachel. Over comms, Sydney guides Rachel, alias Mandy. Discovering Vak likes BDSM, she binds him..."Easy." Kelly arrives too late, "Surprise." Rachel, "My God, you're...evil." Kelly demands the disk. Rachel stabs her shoulder; they knife-fight. Chinese guards fire. Dixon returns fire from the helicopter. Kelly leaps, escaping. Dean threatens to harm Nadia unless Sloane delivers Lasso. Episode epilogue : Sloane visits Nadia, still comatose. Rachel cherishes her family photo. Sydney replays Vaughn's mission comms for her baby.
95	7	"Fait Accompli"	Richard Coad	Andi Bushell	November 17, 2005	6.48
Sydney cons University of Rome's Chancellor to copy his key; Renée raids the archive. Professor Choy recognizes Sydney. Renée defeats another agent for the network access card. Dr. Peter Marks prognosticates Nadia won't recover; Sloane tells Jack and Sydney, he'll help expose Dean's organization. At a Dubai horse track, Grace and Dixon incapacitate Dean's bodyguards. Losing comms, Dean takes Sloane at gunpoint; they struggle. Rachel bludgeon's Dean. Sydney, "Is he conscious?...Hit him again." Sydney interrogates; Dean will trade for $10,000,000 to "disappear." Marshall "Flinkmanizes" LSD serum. Joseph Ehrmann's "associates" want Sloane to "eliminate" Dean. In return...Nadia wakes from her coma, briefly. Convulsions force Marks to re-induce coma. It hints at a permanent cure, but only if Sloan complies. Dean reveals, "Watchman...Glenheim...They insisted to kill Michael Vaughn...they have plans for you..." Sydney, "What plans?" In Seattle, the card allows Marshall to track constantly moving mobile networks; French Intelligence, Russian SVR, European Pharmaceutical conglomerate, CDC, MI-6, "This suggests...they are Government...12 nodes...." Rachel recalls Dean's Cayman protocol, "If there was never a one, there was ever the twelve." Before learning more, Sloane kills Dean. Kelly inherits Dean's authority. Sloane now has hope for Nadia, but Ehrmann has, "a few more things we need...first."
96	8	"Bob"	Donald Thorin, Jr.	Monica Breen & Alison Schapker	December 7, 2005	6.40
On a Siberian train, Lukas Basarov detonates a prototype Micro Pulse Bomb which leaves equipment intact, but incinerates a politician and laborer playing chess, and two others passengers. An MI-6 double agent is suspected. Through an old contact, his MI-6 counterpart Elizabeth Powell, Jack learns the identity of the MPB designer, Basarov. Rachel goes to a "geek" conference in São Paulo, Brazil to tap Basarov's laptop. Under the alias "Bob Brown", Julian Sark is on the same "freelance" mission for his client. Both are successful, and after a few drinks they go back to Sark's room for sex. In Málaga Spain, Jack and Elizabeth witness an arms transaction of a much larger MPB. Instead of identifying the double agent, it ends in an ambush by Benjamin Masari, head of the Sudanese RLF terrorist squad, who steals the weapon, and takes Jack and Elizabeth prisoner, moving them to Tunisia. The team discovers Sark was the leak. Having seen his travel plans, Rachel and Sydney go to Nassau, Bahamas to hire him. Sark arranges to buy the prisoners from Masari, but he's double-crossed and handcuffed to the MPB. Dixon and Grace kill Masari's men. Remotely, Marshall helps Rachel disarm the MPB.
97	9	"The Horizon"	Tucker Gates	Josh Appelbaum & André Nemec	December 14, 2005	5.64
Sydney prepares dinner with Vaughn...waking restrained, "Who are you?" Dr. Gonzalo Burris reassures, he nearly has "what we need." Behind glass, a voice worries, "Stop...this won't harm the baby?" Sydney swears, "If you hurt my baby...I will kill you." San Francisco 2 days earlier : Kelly stabs Agent Zachary Turner, searches "Agent Michael Vaughn," kills another agent, steals hard-drives, and phones Desantis. Her audio tech thinks Vaughn shared "the location." Desantis marvels, we've searched thirty years. In Madrid, Sydney's abducted. Renée shoots the second van, capturing Desantis, "Where are they taking her?!" Burris injects "propofol cocktail" as "forced hypnosis," instructing, "think of Vaughn," probing Sydney's mind. Jack interrogates Desantis. Renée finds Desantis' calendar address, three weeks out; Sydney's due date. Desantis is "prepared to die." Renée shoots him. The voice wants, "the map of SD-6," an org-chart Sydney viewed only once (in "So It Begins"). Burris, "a name...what is it?" Sydney, "X23-Norte." Irina Derevko (the voice) tells Kelly, "I'll let my associates know...the location of The Horizon." Memory-Vaughn tells Sydney, they'll eventually know she gave the wrong name. In Hungary, Jack and Renée find the address; a nursery. Sydney tranquilizes Kelly, but discovers she's at sea onboard the bulk freighter Athena.
98	10	"S.O.S."	Karen Gaviola	J. R. Orci	April 19, 2006	7.49
Kelly's men chase; Sydney radios APO. Marshall discovers its deletion. Jack tasks APO, recover the transmission and uncover the Prophet Five mole inside Langley. Security takes Rachel's phone, which scans the code that Grace enters in Payroll to unlock ECHELON Archives (and WITSEC for the identity of his wife Amanda's murderer). Decoding Enigma, Marshall distracts the tour guide; Dixon triggers Anthrax alarms. Rachel must pull the hard-drive to recover purged data, triggering lockdown. Weiss and Marshall help Rachel escape guards; Dixon extricates Grace. Finding her records and ultrasounds in sickbay, Sydney collapses. Marshall determines the mole has the highest CIA Alpha-Black clearance, narrowing suspects to directors with STU cellphones. Jack meets all seven. Arthur Devlin scoffs, "This meeting is over." Marshall dials; the mole is Jeffrey Davenport. Jack shoots him twice, "Where is she?" breaking his nose. "The Athena...North Atlantic." Security arrests Jack; Dixon mounts a rescue. Sydney undergoes surgery; Dr. Lynn operates! When APO arrives, Sydney is alone. Marshall discovers Grace decrypted WITSEC without permission. Tom finds Karl (alias Allen Korman) speaking German, who apologizes, "Peter...I was under orders." But Peter (aka Thomas Grace) needs to message "The Cardinal." Jack explains they corrected Sydney's placental abruption, saving her baby.
99	11	"Maternal Instinct"	Tucker Gates	Breen Frazier	April 19, 2006	7.49
Mercenaries ambush Davenport's ambulance. Irina kills Davenport, who "compromised our agenda." Suspecting a mole disclosed itineraries, Devlin audits APO. Jack compartmentalizes activities. Sydney's "regression therapy" revealed "Leo 47 Norte." Dixon recalls, "France." Obfuscating her involvement, Irina asks Sydney about the Horizon. Marshall hacks, "Alliance mission, 1999." In Paris, Dixon and René strap Jean Bertrand to his car-hood, speeding to "refresh your memory." Jack, Irina and Sydney infiltrate Queens Bank, Vancouver. Rachel cracks Alex Moreau's password. They retrieve "The Horizon." Kelly arrives, shooting guards. Attacked for the satchel, Jack restrains Irina. Sydney realizes Irina arranged her kidnapping. Jack and Irina argue. "Dad!...Baby's coming." Jack attacks Kelly's forces. Rachel purges Sydney's and Dixon's mission logs. Sloane misdirects Devlin; Rachel deletes "One more," under "JTindle," not "ASloane." Sydney inquires, "The truth takes time?" Irina, "It's never simple." Sydney realizes Irina ordered Vaughn's murder. Irina reveals never wanting children; for Jack's allegiance, "KGB demanded it." Laboring, Sydney permits Irina to shoot a gunman. Leaving with the satchel, Irina returns to deliver the baby. Kelly and "Grandpa" exchange machine-gun fire. Jack shoots a fire-extinguisher, incapacitating Kelly. Jack helps Sydney; Irina, "You have a baby girl." Sydney notices Irina took the Horizon. Jack, "We'll find her." Episode epilogue : In Bhutan, a horseman rides to inform Lama Chödak Gyatso Nubpa, who relays, "My brother...there's good news. You have a daughter." Michael Vaughn smiles.
100	12	"There's Only One Sydney Bristow"	Robert M. Williams, Jr.	Drew Goddard	April 26, 2006	6.43
Four weeks later : In Minsk, Ehrmann brings Sloane to The Twelve. The First thanks Sloane for "work...thus far." The Second offers "capabilities to restore" Nadia's health. First, "one final assignment." The Third advises, "keep your eye on the endgame." Kelly recruits Anna Espinosa from prison; "a long-term, deep-cover operation...destroy Sydney Bristow." Anna abducts Will Tippin. Sloane draws Sydney "back into the field." Agents Rance and Dalton babysit Isabella. APO infiltrates a Moscow club, finding Semanko, Anna, and Will. Sydney fights Anna, who draws blood and escapes. Observing, Dr. Burris has "what we need." Ehrmann observes Anna, "Isotope Data Transfer: Complete." Rance's scanners detect Will's "subdermal device." Marshall comments, "brain stem...radio receiver" bomb. For deactivation, Anna demands Rambaldi's Prophecy, Page 47, directing Sydney to Coimbra's rail-station to Madrid. Jack tasks Marshall, hack the frequency; Will begins scanning in Lisbon. Sydney battles Anna, who takes Page 47 and traps Sydney, who's sprayed with chemical agent, "collecting her DNA." Will releases Sydney, but Anna activates the 30-second bomb timer to escape. Kelly congratulates Sloane, "you've fulfilled your contract," providing Nadia's "compound" cure. In Moscow, Burris applies Project Helix genetic manipulation. Despite Will's compliment, "There's only one Sydney Bristow," Anna emerges; a second.
101	13	"30 Seconds"	Frederick E. O. Toye	Alison Schapker & Monica Breen	May 3, 2006	5.33
In Jaipur, Sydney and Renée remove a contact-center's router encryption key, listening to Anna's calls; Kelly in Barcelona calls art historian-forger Moritz Koller in Zurich to "unveil" Page 47's hidden message. Sloane kills Nadia – for 30 seconds – to save her, injecting The Twelve's cure. Renée seduces Koller, takes Page 47, and "to find Anna Espinosa...I'm taking you hostage." Grace "paints a door," blasting it open. Koller found "titanium dioxide." Sydney, "can't be older than 80 years," but adequate to bait Anna. It's revealed, Sloane kept the original Page 47. Discovering it, Nadia angrily declares she can't tolerate his "faith...make a choice...me or this." Sloane doesn't want to choose. Nadia concludes, "you lose us both," scorching it in the fireplace, which reveals Rambaldi's <0> symbol. Trying to rescue Page 47, Sloane pushes, "Nadia, move." The table's broken glass pierces Nadia's neck, killing her. In Ghana, APO prepares to ambush Anna, baiting with Koller's fake. Anna's driver draws APO agents away, stranding Renée. Looking like Sydney, Anna kills Renée effortlessly. With Nadia dead, Sloane commits himself fully to Rambaldi's endgame, conceding, "Death is a necessary sacrifice...to complete the final leg of this journey...I was chosen." Ehrmann, "We appreciate what you've done. Welcome Back."
102	14	"I See Dead People"	Jamie Babbit	Andi Bushell & J. R. Orci	May 10, 2006	6.08
Sydney gives Nadia's eulogy. The ME finds circuitry inside Renée's corpse. Marshall discovers "André Michaux" on the thirty-year-old corrupted chip (Prophet Five listens-in, contacting Peyton). Anna-as-Sydney replaces Nepali guide Nabin with another, misdirecting Sydney. Marshall discovers Sloane passively surveils phones; Jack warns Sydney she's "compromised." Disabling Fake-Nabin, Sydney shoots an ambusher; Anna-Syd shoots Sydney's tire, takes the chip, and destroys her SUV. Recalling his childhood accident, Vaughn has Anna-Syd extract his chip-half, revealing a German Cold War COG bunker. Conning a Hamburg jeweler, Vaughn finds an evidence board and intel gathered on Prophet Five by Michael's and Rienne's fathers. Vaughn, "Who are you?" Anna-Syd fires...click. They fight. Sydney kills Anna-Syd, saving Vaughn. Posing as Anna-Syd, Sydney tells Kelly, "Complications." Kelly, "And Sydney?" Sydney, "She's dead. This is what they found inside Renée." Kelly, "the rest should be easy." Meanwhile, Grace decodes Business Opportunities: "contact made awaiting response," replying via classifieds. Kelly pressures Sloane to decipher Page 47. Kelly's sent, unwittingly, to Geneva for Pinara's manuscript (Sloane's agent-to-agent contact protocol). Nadia's ghost haunts, taunting, how much longer Sloane can deceive (having already decoded it), mocking belief in "fate? You were chosen?" Sloane lights a votive candle; Sark retrieves Sloane's dead-drop matchbook.
103	15	"No Hard Feelings"	Tucker Gates	Sam Humphrey	May 17, 2006	5.43
"The circle will be complete when The Chosen One finds The Rose in San Cielo." — Milo Rambaldi, The Prophecy (deciphered) For The First, Sloane translates Page 47, "The circle will be complete." He questions how Anna killed "a remarkable agent." Sydney, "wasn't a martyr...legend...just a person...shot in the back....easy." In Rome, Sark meets Sydney, calls police, detonates a bomb, robbing an OTB bar; they're sent to La Fossa prison (San Cielo monastery – Rambaldi's internment before execution). Dixon and Vaughn infiltrate sewers; Marshal hacks a junction-box. Inducing seizure, Sark accesses security; an old man says, "I am the Rose," giving Sydney an amulet, Rambaldi's "greatest gift," and "curse...defiance of the natural order...The end of nature itself." Sydney, "very bad people want...this." The Rose, "You can't stop them." Sydney, "You don't know me very well." Kelly cons the Warden for extradition. Sloane tasers Sydney, strangling, "Sydney deserved better than an anonymous bullet." Marshall triggers alarms, distracting Sloane. Sydney fights, "I don't die that easy." Sloane escapes with the amulet. Vaughn shoots a guard, rescuing her. Meanwhile, Marshall informs Rachel, "Tom's been lying." Confronted, Tom believes "The Cardinal" ordered his schoolteacher-wife killed." They steal Korman's WITSEC-seized car. Korman retrieves diamonds, pulling a gun. Tom, "Tell me why" Amanda "had to die." Korman, "wrong place...wrong time," driving away. Tom detonates the car-bomb. Episode epilogue : Sloane phones, "It was you, Sydney....You're a survivor, just like me....thanks to you, I have everything I need."
104	16	"Reprisal"	Frederick E. O. Toye	Monica Breen & Alison Schapker	May 22, 2006	6.68
"My fiancée was gunned down in front of me. It turns out he wasn't the first. They killed anyone who got too close. They'd infiltrated the highest levels of governments, and the inner sanctums of intelligence agencies. They appeared to control entire sectors of technology, finance, defense. We believed they were run by a group of twelve, whose power was everywhere and nowhere, because no one knew who they were...until now. I've lived with secrets all my life...and I'm done." — Sydney Bristow, prologue narration In Sydney, Sydney photographs the first man and two others. Globally, APO identifies all Twelve. For self-preservation, Sloane, Sark and Peyton plot to solidify power, abducting Marshall and Rachel to hack ground-penetrating satellites. Marshall refuses "end-of-the-world bad!" Kelly tortures Marshall; Sark tortures Rachel. Carrie provides Op-Tech through Marshall's password, "Moonglum of Elwher." Called "twisted...weak...pathetic," Nadia haunt-taunts Sloane, "Marshall's right...Love..Family..Honor....you'll never break them." Sloane extorts Sydney, "Marshall, whatever he asks." Replying, "Tell Carrie...I'll finish reading Littlest Fish..." Marshall hints, "Rachel...leapfrog the system." Deciphering lead character "Noah," Carrie hacks NOAA satellites for location. Rachel locates Rambaldi's cave; "Umbria." Sloane, "should've known...Eliminate them." Carrie pinpoints Ixtapa; Jack mounts a rescue. Picking handcuffs with underwire, Rachel shoots a guard, freeing Marshall; Sydney kills two more. At Mount Subasio, Vaughn belays Sydney's rappel into a chasm. Sloane holds Rambaldi's amulet. Sark plants a bomb. Having captured schematics, Jack orders APO-Subway evacuation. Tom slows countdown with liquid nitrogen. In Zurich, Peyton kills The Twelve (expecting the amulet) with machine-pistols. Radioing, Tom "would've asked you out." Rachel "would've said yes." The bomb kills Tom, destroying APO-HQ. Holding the amulet against rising sun-rays, something appears. "Sydney...You're not allowed to see." Sloane shoots a hidden crevasse; Sydney falls through.
105	17	"All the Time in the World"	Tucker Gates	Drew Goddard & Jeff Pinkner	May 22, 2006	6.68
Flashbacks reveal Sydney's earlier life-events; Project Christmas building-block testing; hearing her mother died; discussing majors with Francie Calfo; "CIA" recruitment; working for Credit Dauphine. Vaughn finds Sydney unconscious, reviving her. Deal successful, Peyton reveals The Horizon. Sark asks about global genocide. Sloane confirms, revealing two nuclear missiles. Deducing Sloane has another ally, Sydney has Marshall hacks banks, phones, satellites, locating Peyton, who Rachel knows fears snakes. Peyton says Sloane's targeting two major cities, naming his Hong Kong ally. In Mongolia, Sloane excavates Rambaldi's tomb; the Horizon collects red Mueller fluid. Sydney takes the Horizon, instigating a stand-off with Sark holding Vaughn and Jack. Sloane shoots Jack; Sydney kills Sloane, who falls into a Mueller-red pool. Sark escapes with the Horizon. Jack urges Sydney to go stop Irina Derevko. Irina has Sark target London and D.C.. Irina tells Sydney, power is the only currency; through Rambaldi, they'll live forever. Sydney and Irina fight. Vaughn shoots Sark for launch abort codes. Restored to eternal life, Sloane offers to heal Jack, who detonates explosives, entombing Sloane forever. Still struggling, Irina falls to her death trying to grab the Horizon. Nadia's ghost mocks Sloane, who has "all the time in the world." Series epilogue : Seven year-old Isabelle builds sand castles by the ocean as "Uncle Dixon" arrives. Vaughn greets the Deputy Director. Sydney cradles toddler son, Jack. Dixon asks Sydney for field assistance, but Vaughn suggests dinner first. Isabelle unpacks and effortlessly stacks Project Christmas blocks – then nonchalantly knocks them down to join Sydney, Vaughn and Dixon for a walk on the beach.

== Home release ==
The Season 5 Set was released in Region 1 (4-Disc Set, NTSC, U.S.) on November 21, 2006. In Region 2 (5-Disc Set, PAL, UK) on November 20, 2006, and Region 4 (5-Disc Set, PAL, AU) on October 14, 2007.

Region 4 was initially supposed to receive Season 5 (5-Disc Set, PAL, Australia) on March 14, 2007, however Buena Vista postponed the title due to the Seven Network's delayed broadcast of the series.

The DVD set includes the final 17 episodes of the series, presented in Anamorphic Widescreen (1.78:1), along with English Dolby Digital 5.1 audio. The set contains the following extras.

- Celebrating 100: Behind the Scenes of the 100th Episode
- The Legend of Rambaldi
- Heightening the Drama: The Music of Alias
- The New Recruit: On Set with Rachel Nichols
- Season 5 Bloopers
- Deleted Scenes
- Audio Commentaries by Jennifer Garner, J. J. Abrams, Victor Garber, Rachel Nichols, David Anders, and others.
- Hidden Easter Eggs
