= Alias season 3 =

Alias
- Season 3
- Season 3 DVD cover
- No. of episodes: 22

Release
- Original network: ABC
- Original release: September 28, 2003 – May 23, 2004

Season chronology
- ← Previous; Season 2 Next → Season 4

The third season of the American drama/adventure television series Alias premiered September 28, 2003 on ABC and concluded May 23, 2004 and was released on DVD in region 1 on September 7, 2004. Guest stars in season three include Vivica A. Fox, Isabella Rossellini, Ricky Gervais, Griffin Dunne, Djimon Hounsou, Peggy Lipton, and Quentin Tarantino.

A seven-minute animated short titled The Animated Alias: Tribunal was produced for the DVD release of the third season. The short takes place between the second and third seasons.

== Cast ==
=== Main ===
- Jennifer Garner as Sydney Bristow (22 episodes)
- Ron Rifkin as Arvin Sloane (21 episodes)
- Michael Vartan as Michael Vaughn (22 episodes)
- Carl Lumbly as Marcus Dixon (22 episodes)
- Kevin Weisman as Marshall Flinkman (22 episodes)
- David Anders as Julian Sark (20 episodes)
- Melissa George as Lauren Reed (19 episodes)
- Greg Grunberg as Eric Weiss (22 episodes)
- Victor Garber as Jack Bristow (22 episodes)

=== Recurring ===
- Kurt Fuller as NSC Director Robert Lindsey (6 episodes)
- Patricia Wettig as Dr. Judy Barnett (5 episodes)
- Mark Bramhall as Andrian Lazarey (4 episodes)
- Amanda Foreman as Carrie Bowman (3 episodes)
- Djimon Hounsou as Kazari Bomani (3 episodes)
- Peggy Lipton as Olivia Reed (3 episodes)
- Mía Maestro as Nadia Santos (3 episodes)
- Isabella Rossellini as Katya Derevko (3 episodes)
- Merrin Dungey as Allison Doren (2 episodes)
- Quentin Tarantino as McKenas Cole (2 episodes)
- Bradley Cooper as Will Tippin (1 episode)
- Terry O'Quinn as FBI Assistant Director Kendall (1 episode)

== Episodes ==
No. overall	No. in season	Title	Directed by	Written by	Original release date	US viewers (millions)
45	1	"The Two"	Ken Olin	J. J. Abrams	September 28, 2003	9.73
Unconscious after shooting Allison Doren, the Project Helix-produced doppelgängerin of best friend Francie Calfo (in "The Telling"), Sydney wakes...in Hong Kong without knowing how she arrived. Vaughn, now married, explains she was presumed dead by DNA found on "her" remains from the fire in her home two years ago. Meanwhile: Will survived Allison's attack; Vaughn is now a teacher; Dixon is CIA Division Director; NSC Director Robert Lindsey imprisoned Jack; allegedly reformed Sloane is CEO of Zurich-based philanthropic World Health Organization, OmniFam; Irina's #6 of CIA's "Most Wanted"; Sydney's stomach has a new, unexplained scar; and Carrie is pregnant by Marshall. In Lyon, aircraft engineer Scott Kingsley is murdered for his radar-invisible spy drone schematics by Russian ex-MVD hitman Gordei Volkov, (Note: Oleg Taktarov as Gordei Volkov) now affiliated with The Covenant. Sydney is granted temporary clearance to retrieve Kingsley's microchip in Paris. Agent Eric Weiss leads the failed assault, ambushed by Volkov who escapes; only Sydney and Eric survive. Lindsey designates Sydney an enemy of the state for going rogue to confront Sloane. Monsieur Bernard helps Sydney end Volkov to retrieve the microchip, with which she extorts Lindsey, demanding Jack's release. Jack reveals video of Sydney cutting the throat of Russian diplomat Andrian Lazarey.
46	2	"Succession"	Dan Attias	Alex Kurtzman & Roberto Orci	October 5, 2003	9.40
Two CIA operatives are abducted. A call is placed to the CIA with instructions on where to locate their demands. Sydney goes to retrieve the package and ends up with a surprise none of them were expecting. The demand was to exchange prisoners. While CIA along with NSA director Bob Lindsey agree to the terms, Bob Lindsey has an idea of his own and it thwarts the exchange. Vaughn now wants to come back to the agency. Jack meets with Sloane. They run an op to go look for the missing agent that was not recovered. The man who has the agent is the man who had Sydney while she was gone those twho years, she can't get answers from him because he succumbs to his gun shot wound. The reason for the prisoner exchange is revealed at the end. Lauren Reed, Vaughn's wife, is appointed the CIA's new liaison with the National Security Council
47	3	"Reunion"	Jack Bender	Jeff Pinkner	October 12, 2003	8.93
A French satellite crashes into Russia and almost triggers a nuclear war. ECHELON picks up a call indicating that Sark is involved. Sydney travels to Mexico City to spy on Sark, who is meeting with dishonorably discharged Russian space command general, Boris Oransky. After discovering their plot, she and Vaughn go to Moscow to assess the bunker under the Science Ministry to steal Medusa, a pulse weapon capable of crippling satellite networks, before Sark gets it. The NSC assigns Loren to investigate Lazarey's death. Jack corrupts the security camera image to stop Sydney from being identified as Lazarey's killer.
48	4	"A Missing Link"	Lawrence Trilling	Monica Breen & Alison Schapker	October 19, 2003	9.45
Four vials filled with the deadly Ebola virus are stolen by a group of freelance criminals. One of them, security expert Laszlo Bogdan, is infected; he is caught, but dies. Sydney is assigned to infiltrate the gang posing as a security expert for their next job. In Seville, she meets the gang's leader, Simon Walker, who calls her Julia. As a test of her skills, Sydney is asked to steal a 150-carat diamond necklace at a formal soiree just as Simon alerts the police, leaving only moments for her to prove herself. Sark appears at the pre-heist meeting in Pamplona and nearly recognizes Sydney. The heist is successful but Vaughn is captured by the gang. To stop Simon from shooting and killing Vaughn, Sydney stabs him instead, pushing him down the roadside embankment, with the intent to take him to the hospital later, thus maintaining her cover under Simon. Meanwhile, Jack takes matters into his own hands to protect his daughter, purposely revealing Sydney's deadly secret to Dixon in order to preserve her position inside the CIA.
49	5	"Repercussions"	Ken Olin	Jesse Alexander	October 26, 2003	9.45
Sydney tries to recover the biological weapon (stolen in "A Missing Link") but Simon already delivered it to Sark. The DNA-specific virus is unleashed inside a maximum security prison facility in the Ural Mountains to free Kazari Bomani, Africa's biggest arms dealer. Kazari kidnaps Sloane to exact revenge for turning him to be imprisoned. Jack tries to dig up information on Sydney's missing two years when she accompanied criminal crew boss Simon Walker under the alias, Julia Thorne. Wanting to know where Simon met Julia and how he knew her, Jack contacts Simon in Paris, ostensibly to steal a prototype. However, Jack's cover is jeopardized when he meets him. Meanwhile, Marshall is sent on his second field mission with Sydney, posing as a Texan high-stakes gambler. They travel to Osaka to copy and disable the first AI virus, developed by the Yakuza, before Sark and Bermani can obtain it.
50	6	"The Nemesis"	Lawrence Trilling	Crystal Nix-Hines	November 2, 2003	8.92
Lauren traces Lazarey's phone calls to a London address and finds that the tenant is Julia Thorne (Sydney's alias for the past two years). Robert Lang designs a device which can interface with all control consoles and bypass all security protocols to any missile silo in Russia. He undergoes plastic surgery to hide from the Covenant. In Milan, Allison, saved by the Covenant, kills Lang, takes his RFID chip, and knocks Sydney unconscious, so the Covenant can recover something hidden in Sydney's memory. Sydney tracks Allison to Sofia, shoots her, and retrieves the device. Allison escapes during transfer to a hospital.
51	7	"Prelude"	Jack Bender	J. R. Orci	November 9, 2003	9.26
Sydney accompanies Sloane on a Covenant assignment to steal a maser OS from the Chinese Defense Minister's office. Marshall uses a camouflaged remote-control car to disable security, allowing Sydney to break into a safe. Discovered, Sydney overpowers guards, scrambles the OS and escapes. Sloane gives Sydney a key and coded message in Sydney's handwriting, leading to Julia Thorne's Rome apartment. Jack explains it was encoded with Irina's method, suggesting they might've had recent contact. In Mexico, Vaughn and Lauren try to extradite Javier Perez, who claims to know about Lazarey's murder. They are taken hostage en route, giving Jack a chance to kill Perez, making it appear as a suicide. Claiming to be interested in avenging his father's death, Sark provides Lauren evidence that Julia Thorne is really Sydney, who killed Lazarey. Vaughn helps Sydney escape before being arrested by the National Security Council. Lauren tells Dixon that he is no longer in charge of the task force due to obstructing her investigation. Sydney enters the apartment in Rome. She recognizes an angelic statue outside her window – the same recurring figure in her nightmares. But before she can recall more, Sydney is suddenly arrested by Italian policemen.
52	8	"Breaking Point"	Dan Attias	Breen Frazier	November 23, 2003	8.48
NSC Director Lindsey assumes control of Dixon's division. Sydney is taken to Camp Williams, an NSC black site that interrogates terrorists. Dr. Vasson (Note: Erick Avari as Dr. Vasson) subjects Sydney to electroshock torture to coerce her into decoding a message found in her Rome apartment. Her valiant escape attempt fails. Jack and Vaughn organize a rescue team with help from Sloane and ex-CIA Agent Thomas Brill. (Note: Richard Roundtree as Brill) They obtain blueprints by infiltrating a FEMA facility; Sloane is shot escaping. Jack operates, removing the bullet. Lindsey extorts Lauren into whitewashing Sydney's interrogation report by threatening to expose Vaughn's involvement in Sydney's earlier escape. Sydney is persuaded to reveal the decoded coordinates from the message when Lindsey orders the stabbing of fellow inmate Campbell. However, Campbell is revealed to be Schapker, (Note: Pruitt Taylor Vince as Campbell / Schapker) who knows empathetic suffering is harder for Sydney to sustain than physical torture. Marshall attempts to obtain access codes for Camp Williams, but they have mysteriously been deleted. With Lauren's help, the extraction team infiltrate the Camp just as Vasson is about operate on Sydney's cranium to obtain information from her two missing years. Lauren helps them rescue Sydney, who reveals that she gave Lindsey the wrong coordinates.
53	9	"Conscious"	Ken Olin	Josh Appelbaum & André Nemec	November 30, 2003	9.16
At the coordinates (from "Breaking Point"), Sydney and Jack find a tattooed hand indicating Magnific Order of Rambaldi membership. Lauren tells Lindsey she was captured by The Covenant, who are ransoming Sydney for the Rambaldi Device. Sydney visits Dr. Brezzel, (Note: David Cronenberg as Dr. Brezzel) a neuro-researcher who specializes in dream memory state. Sydney enters a drug-induced dream state, reliving Allison's attack. Knocked unconscious, she can't see her abductors' faces. Sydney relives her seventh birthday party, with "St. Aidan" on the cake, which she cuts, slicing into Lazarey's hand. Next, she's wheeled by gurney to doors marked "47." Dream-Lauren attacks, causing real-life heart failure; Brezzel resuscitates Sydney. Sloane reinforces Lauren's lie about Sydney's abduction; Lindsey requests an assassin to kill Sydney during the ransom exchange, revealing proof he knows Sloane's endgame. Lauren matches hand DNA with Lazarey, but the hand was alive four months ago, and video of Sydney killing Lazarey was time-stamped a year ago; thus Sydney did not murder Lazarey. Sydney re-enters dream-state. She's with Dixon in a car; "St. Aidan" appears again. Instead of fighting Lauren again, Sydney meets herself, who says "trust Lazarey." They fight. Real Sydney defeats dream-Sydney, allowing entry to Room 47, in which she exclaims, "Oh my God!"
54	10	"Remnants"	Jack Bender	Jeff Pinkner	December 7, 2003	8.61
Sydney dreams Will and the name St. Aidan. Sydney visits Will, in WITSEC, working as a construction foreman. He had thought Sydney was dead but Sydney proves her identity and tells Will that Alison Doren is still alive, working for The Covenant. Will explains that St. Aidan is the name of a CIA contact. Sydney and Will meet St. Aidan, revealed as Andrian Lazarey, having one hand missing, and mentioning an item in Graz. Sark abducts Lazarey and tortures him for more information. Will and Sydney reminisce and become intimate. In a Graz hotel, Sydney discovers her "Julia Thorne" safe deposit box. She breaks into it, but Sark arrives first, stealing a metal hexagonal cylinder. Will fights and kills Allison Doren while Sydney gets the cylinder from Sark. It contains a sample of human tissue, still vital, bearing the name Milo Rambaldi. Lindsey suspects Jack and Vaughn know Sydney's location and arrests them. He arranges for Sloane to hire an assassin to kill Sydney when she gets exchanged for a Rambaldi device, threatening to reveal Sloane's extracurricular activities to the Justice Department. However, Sloane has Lindsey killed instead, and steals the Rambaldi device for himself.
55	11	"Full Disclosure"	Lawrence Trilling	Jesse Alexander	January 11, 2004	9.05
The Covenant steals Rambaldi's Cube from the DSR during transport. Kendall reveals what happened during Sydney's missing years. Sydney was taken by Oleg Madrczyk (Note: Bill Bolender as Oleg Madrczyk) (who she recalls killing in Hong Kong). Madrczyk had planted tooth DNA to fool investigators. For six months, Madrczyk tried brainwashing Sydney, and administered the final loyalty test; murdering a helpless man. As a "Project Christmas" child, Sydney was conditioned to thwart enemy programming. Nine months after her apparent death, she called Kendall, having escaped from The Covenant. Kendall persuaded Sydney to maintain her double agent alias, Julia Thorne. The Covenant tasked Sydney to kill Lazarey after obtaining Rambaldi's Cube; instead, Sydney faked Lazarey's death and hid the Cube. Kendall reveals he runs DSR's Project Black Hole, collecting Rambaldi's artifacts, and Sydney is still considered, The Chosen One. She prepared a DVD, explaining her voluntary memory-wipe to safeguard Rambaldi's DNA, to prevent followers from fertilizing her stolen eggs (thus her abdominal scare). Marshall secretly tracked the Cube; the team raids the Covenant base in Patagonia. Against Kendall's orders, Sydney burns their lab. Sark escapes, ordering his father Lazarey's assassination. Before he's shot, Lazarey asks Sydney about "The Passenger." The sniper is revealed as Lauren.
56	12	"Crossings"	Ken Olin	Josh Appelbaum & André Nemec	January 18, 2004	7.58
Sydney and Vaughn fly to North Korea to meet Covenant defector Leonid Lisenker. (Note: Griffin Dunne as Leonid Lisenker) Lauren alerts Covenant operative Mr. Zisman, (Note: Arnold Vosloo as Mr. Zisman) who has the pilots poisoned, dying en-route. Sydney and Vaughn evade North Korean missiles, crash-land, and elude soldiers. Discussing the difficulty of working together, Sydney reveals sleeping with Will, but she's moved on. Before they meet Lisenker, Sark intercepts, masquerading as a CIA Agent. Soldiers capture them; Sark escapes. Lisenker informs to Colonel Yu, avoiding the beating Sydney and Vaughn take. Jack asks Sydney's mother Irina Derevko for assistance; her sister Katya helps on condition he kills Sloane. Jack arrives after Katya warns Sloane, "back off" from Irina, hinting Jack would kill him. She tells Jack to abort. Before their execution, Vaughn admits his feelings for Sydney. Katya's contact, Mr. Kwan, kills the firing squad; they escape with Lisenker.
57	13	"After Six"	Maryann Brandon	Monica Breen & Alison Schapker	February 15, 2004	9.54
The Covenant defector, Lisenker, discloses the location of the Doleac Agenda, a microdisc which contains information about the six Covenant cells. It is in a chalet with a protection system designed by security expert Toni Cummings, (Note: Vivica A. Fox as Toni Cummings) whom Sydney and Weiss meet while posing as diamond smugglers. They obtain schematics of the security systems, bypass the lethal response security and escape with the Agenda. Sloane meets with CIA psychologist Dr. Barnett and reveals that he has a secret that affects the only two people he cares about in the world, Sydney and Jack. Sark meets with Lauren and reveals that he knows her affiliation with The Covenant. He proposes that they stage a coup, kill all six cell leaders and demand ascension within The Covenant by threatening to present the CIA with access keys kept by each of the leaders. After killing the leaders, Sark meets with McKenas Cole (Note: Quentin Tarantino as McKenas Cole) who then reveals that Lauren had informed him of their intentions and was happy that the leaders were dead since the CIA were soon to learn of their identities. As a reward, Cole makes Sark and Lauren the heads of the North American cell.
58	14	"Blowback"	Lawrence Trilling	Laurence Andries	March 7, 2004	7.39
The CIA intercepts a communication suggesting that a terrorist organization, Shining Sword, has a plasma charge weapon. Sydney and Vaughn access a secure data facility to download information but their access is cut short by a Covenant operative who escapes after a car chase. They trace the weapon to a ship but Vaughn is shot while on board. The story is then replayed, with additional scenes showing Lauren's involvement in the operation. She had leaked information, it was her in the secure data facility and it was she and Sark that had escaped in the car. Lauren is aroused by the operation and makes love with Sark. Back aboard the ship, Sark and Lauren attempt to stop Sydney and Vaughn. Vaughn gets the upper hand, demanding that Lauren remove her mask but before Lauren reveals her identity, Sark threatens to kill Sydney. Sark and Lauren escape, arming the weapon which Vaughn disables with Marshall's remote assistance. Sloane meets Dr. Barnett, revealing that he had an affair with Irina Derevko and that Sydney may be his daughter.
59	15	"Façade"	Jack Bender	R. P. Gaborno and Christopher Hollier	March 14, 2004	7.43
Daniel Ryan (Note: Ricky Gervais as Daniel Ryan) detonates a bomb in Belfast, proving his bombs cannot be disarmed to advertise his skill to The Covenant. The recent Covenant defector Lysanker provides information, allowing Sydney to capture Ryan disguised as a Covenant operative. The team creates a Moscow hotel room facade to convince Ryan to stop his next bomb, promising to buy his entire stock. Ryan agrees, but demands Sark conduct the deal from an airplane. A contact doesn't show, forcing a reevaluation of Ryan. His brother was murdered by The Covenant, thus he planned revenge against Sark. Vaughn finds Ryan's bomb on the plane. The team lifts the facade, revealing their CIA office, but Ryan refuses to help. Sydney sympathizes with Ryan, explaining how The Covenant stole her life also, turning her into Julia Thorne. Her admission piques Ryan's interest; he agrees to disarm the bomb, supplying a pager code. However, this activates a five-minute timer on two bombs; on the plane, and in the CIA office. Ryan reveals he recognizes Julia Thorne as the Covenant operative who slaughtered his brother (described in "Full Disclosure"). Jack takes drastic action, coercing Ryan for the deactivation code. Both bombs stop with one second remaining.
60	16	"Taken"	Lawrence Trilling	J. R. Orci	March 21, 2004	7.93
Sark escapes while being extradited from France to the U.S. for interrogation. Dixon's children, Robin and Steven, are kidnapped. The team tries to rescue the children but almost fall into a deadly trap. Lauren checks and leaks Sark's flight details, but leave the trail to Sloane so that the latter is arrested. The Covenant releases Steven along with the message that ten operatives are to be released. Their real target is a Rambaldi box from Project Black Hole in the Nevada desert in vault 45. Sydney infiltrates the DSR facility, obtains the box, and exchanges it for Robin.
61	17	"The Frame"	Max Mayer	Crystal Nix-Hines	March 28, 2004	8.80
Kazari obtains the map of the keys of the Rambaldi box. Vaughn wants a divorce from Lauren. Sark suggests Lauren kill her father so Vaughn will stay with her. Jack presents evidence to Senator Reed that her daughter is a mole. Kazari and Sark interpret the map at the Gaborone Russian consulate before Sydney gets it. Senator Reed confronts Lauren; he's killed and framed as the mole. Sydney and Vaughn dive into a cave near Okinawa; Kazari attacks and gets the keys. Sloane is sentenced to be executed in two weeks for violating his pardon. Vaughn goes back to Lauren.
62	18	"Unveiled"	Jack Bender	Monica Breen & Alison Schapker	April 11, 2004	8.47
Sydney and Vaughn track Cypher, (Note: Morgan Weisser as Cypher) a Covenant cyber terrorist targeting worldwide medical facilities, to a Berlin club, but Lauren, disguised as a club waitress, shoots him. Before Cypher dies, he gives Vaughn the computer worm, which is designed to search genetic databases to find a specific woman, whom Dr. Robert Viadro has treated. Sloane reveals his recruitment by Sen. Reed into The Trust, a secret U.S. Government organization, to which Sloane's been tasked to provide Rambaldi information in exchange for his pardon; Diego Machuca (Note: Geno Silva as Diego Machuca) verifies Sloane's recruitment, adding "Project Centigrade" is their black budget front. To ensure Sloane's death penalty, Jack denies the Trust's existence. Lauren tortures Dr. Viadro for the woman's identity. Losing faith in Lauren's effectiveness, Bomani Kazari plans to shoot her, but Sark kills Kazari, saving Lauren. Suspicious of Lauren, Vaughn checks her belongings, finding her gun, silencer and the wig she wore to disguise herself as the club waitresses, which unveils her as Cypher's murderer.
63	19	"Hourglass"	Ken Olin	Josh Appelbaum & André Nemec	April 18, 2004	7.96
In Nepal, Sark tries abducting the monk Conrad, (Note: David Carradine as Conrad) in vain; Olivia Reed (Note: Peggy Lipton as Olivia Reed) tranquilizes Conrad. Sydney affects a rescue, but Sark shoots Conrad. Dying, he says, "They have The Restoration...Passenger is compromised. It's...You. The Passenger...She is your Destiny...your sister." Confronted by his affair with Irina, Sloane tells Sydney he founded OmniFam to search for his daughter via DNA sampling. Weiss connects "The Restoration" to Conrad's encoded Passenger manuscript. Jack uses a fake decoder to discover Lauren's Covenant handler...revealing her mother Olivia's involvement. Vaughn scans the manuscript, detailing The Hourglass, purchased by Yakuza shipper Masa Raidon in San Pedro. But, the Hourglass will only reveal The Passenger to the father; Sloane. Jack still doesn't budge; Sydney bluffs that she checked Reed's documents...she knows the Trust exists. Director of Legal Policy at Justice, Marlon Bell (Note: Glenn Morshower as Marlon Bell) also wants Sloane dead. Jack toasts to Arvin's execution with Chambertin-Clos de Bèze. Sloane's execution is prepared while Sydney raids Raidon's stronghold. Sloane is pronounced dead before Sydney returns with the Hourglass. She walks away from Jack, "Stop. There's nothing you can say." Olivia tells Lauren, Vaughn played her, "his last mistake." Jack revives Sloane, "Modified kayexalate cocktail...with tetrodotoxin...like we used in Saigon." Jack still needs Sloane.
64	20	"Blood Ties"	Jack Bender	Story by : Monica Breen & Alison Schapker; Teleplay by : J. R. Orci	April 25, 2004	8.25
Unsure of The Trust's agenda, Jack hides Sloane, who explains the Passenger is a conduit to Rambaldi via elixir injection; altered states of consciousness channel "the key to Rambaldi's endgame." Thomas Brill warns Vaughn his father was a Rambaldi follower protecting the little girl from the KGB and CIA. Sloane converts the Hourglass into a battery, locating another artifact locked inside the Smithsonian. Sloane tricks Bell, finding all five Trust members for retinal-scans. Sydney, alias Shannon Gerard, dinosaur researcher, raids the Trust's vault. Using green liquid from the smashed Hourglass, the boxy artifact prints brainwaves. DoD-designed satellites with remote encephalography locate Talia Kozlov. Sydney infiltrates her Chechnyan women's prison. Sark tortures Vaughn to locate the Passenger. Marshall finds him on CCTV. Lauren leaves Vaughn to die. "The Passenger and The Chosen One shall battle...Neither will survive." — Milo Rambaldi, The Prophecy (excerpt) Rescued, Talia claims she's Argentine Intelligence, "My name is Nadia." At Sloane's safe-house, Sloane takes Nadia away while Sydney and Jack fight the Covenant. Hidden, they overhear Lauren saying, "Sloane set us up. He betrayed us." Rescued, Vaughn warns Sydney, "You have to let her go." Irina murdered his father for hiding Nadia, and Rambaldi prophesied Sydney won't survive against Nadia. Handcuffed, Sloane injects Nadia with the elixir.
65	21	"Legacy"	Lawrence Trilling	Jesse Alexander	May 2, 2004	8.27
Nadia lock-picks her cuffs, injects elixir into Sloane, "How do you like it?" and destroys remaining vials. He arranges to steal elixir from Soviet Rambaldi research bunker Novgorod 21; Sloan's fixer alerts Sark. Sydney collects samples. Marshall finds video; young Nadia channel-writing Rambaldi. SVR Colonel Katya Derevko helps them escape. Vaughn orders Weiss to re-task satellites on Lauren, who trades a vial for Sloane's demonstration. Marshall explains elixir as "stored...muscle memory," causing "brain damage...even death." Cautioned about rage against Lauren, Vaughn receives Jack's storage key; weapons, contacts, disposal facilities for "her remains...." In Cienfuegos, they find who tested young Nadia; Dr. Zhang Lee, "Numbers...Equation...Coordinates...to...Rambaldi." Fixated, Vaughn acid-tortures Lee to find Lauren. Sydney is appalled. Toni Cummings bargains with Jack; time-served for disabling Sloan's Kyoto security. Sloane's pressured to increase dosage, instigating gunplay; Lauren opens an elixir IV drip. The team breaches, driving them away; Sloane removes the needle. Obsessed, Vaughn chases Lauren, abandoning Sydney fighting gunmen to secure Nadia. Sloane, Sark and Lauren escape. Nadia shoots the last gunman, saving Sydney, who tells Vaughn, "I won't cover for you...again." He left her unprotected. To "figure things out between us," he'd better deal with his betrayal anger. Vaughn retrieves Jack's sniper rifle.
66	22	"Resurrection"	Ken Olin	Jeff Pinkner	May 23, 2004	7.65
Disguised as Sydney, Lauren obtains Rambaldi's equation from Dixon's rotunda, shooting Marshall, who triggers the alarm; Sark triggers cellphone bombs. Agents surround Sark. Lauren escapes. Counterterrorist analyst Hank Foster (Note: Cotter Smith as Hank Foster) interrogates, "Let's talk about your sister." Sydney, "We're through talking." Vaughn brutalizes Sark, infiltrates Lauren's safe-house, finds coordinates, and captures Lauren, but he's stabbed from behind. At Nadia's safe-house, Sloane wants her last manuscript...locating Rambaldi's "Sphere of Life" housing "his consciousness...essence...soul." Sydney impersonates Lauren for Sark's backup data and pass-phrase; Nietzsche's, "Woman was God's second mistake." She arrives at Palermo. Vaughn tells Weiss, Syd's "walking into a trap." Katya stabbed him...not Lauren. Katya finds Sydney, claiming she's also infiltrating...Katya tries shooting her, but Sydney removed the magazine; Sydney tranqs Katya. Nadia flees her safe-house, admitting, "I altered the equation." Sloan, "Covenant has the wrong coordinates." Nadia, "We have a long journey ahead of us." S.A.B. 47 Project Initiated: 17 April 1975; Subject: Sydney Anne Bristow; Senior Project Manager: Jack Bristow Struggling, Lauren hints it's not chance both Sydney and Nadia are agents...pawns. Lauren knows her own controller; Sydney doesn't...there's proof in Wittenberg. Vaughn arrives and kills Lauren, "One, zero, six, two...." Season epilogue : The Wittenberg bank box #1026 contains the CIA's "S.A.B. 47 Project" about which, Jack tells Sydney, "You were never supposed to have found this."

== Home release ==
The 6-DVD box set of Season 3 was released in region 1 format (US) on September 7, 2004, in region 2 format (UK) on May 30, 2005 and in region 4 format (AU) on January 5, 2005. The DVDs contain all episodes of Season 3, plus the following features:

- Animated Alias: Tribunal – a brief animated feature detailing a mission that Sydney undertook during her "missing" two years.
- Deleted scenes
- Blooper reel
- Featurette: Burbank to Barcelona – a look at the production design
- Gadget Lab – Marshall Finkman's gadgets from script to screen
- The Alias Diaries – meet the unsung craftsmen and technicians
- Team Alias – two sport-related features: a special introduction filmed for Monday Night Football, and Michael Vartan meets the Stanley Cup.
- Ultimate fan audio commentary
- Script scanner
- Cast & Crew Commentaries
- Widescreen anamorphic video format.
