= Channing Dungey =

American television executive

- Born: Channing Nicole Dungey; March 14, 1969 (age 57); Sacramento, California, U.S.
- Education: University of California, Los Angeles
- Occupations: Television executive; producer
- Years active: 1991–present: President of ABC Entertainment Group (2016–2018); Vice President of Netflix (2018–2020); Chairwoman of Warner Bros. Television (2020–present); Chairwoman of Warner Bros. Discovery Global Linear Networks (2025–2026); Chairwoman of Skydance Global Cable Media (2026-present)
- Spouse: Scott Power (m. 2003)
- Children: 2
- Relatives: Merrin Dungey (sister)

Channing Nicole Dungey (born March 14, 1969) is an American television executive and the first black American president of a major broadcast television network. In 2020, she was announced as the new chairwoman and CEO of Warner Bros. Television.

== Early life ==
Dungey was born in Sacramento, California, to Don and Judith Dungey. She is the older of two daughters; her younger sister is actress Merrin Dungey. Dungey graduated from Rio Americano High School in 1986. In 1991, Dungey graduated from the UCLA School of Theater, Film and Television.

== Career ==
Dungey began her career in entertainment as a development assistant for producers J. Todd Harris and Joseph M. Singer. She later joined Warner Bros. as a production assistant, where she helped develop and supervise a number of commercially successful films including The Bridges of Madison County (1995), Heat (1995), The Matrix (1999), and The Devil's Advocate (1997). Dungey joined Disney's ABC Studios in the summer of 2004, later becoming head of drama. In that role, she is credited with helping to build the prolific television portfolio of Shonda Rhimes "from the ground up."

She was appointed president of ABC Entertainment on February 17, 2016, replacing Paul Lee. The appointment made Dungey the first Black executive to run a major U.S. television network. She oversaw the development of ABC Studios shows such as Scandal, How to Get Away with Murder, Nashville, Quantico, Army Wives, and Once Upon a Time. During the second cancellation of Roseanne on May 29, 2018, despite having previously defended the show's racially controversial jokes; Dungey labeled Barr's tweet “abhorrent, repugnant and inconsistent with our values”, drawing praise on social media.

She was ABC Entertainment's president when a Black-ish episode was pulled from the schedule. Dungey noted ABC executives disagreed with the creative direction of the episode, wherein the writers touched on NFL players kneeling during the American national anthem to protest police brutality and show support for Black human rights.

On November 16, 2018, Dungey left her role as President of the ABC Entertainment Group in advance of management changes triggered by Disney's takeover of 21st Century Fox. Karey Burke, head of original programming for Disney's Freeform cable channel, took Dungey's position as head of ABC Entertainment. On December 17, 2018, it was reported that Netflix had hired Dungey as their new vice president of original content. While at Netflix Dungey reported to Cindy Holland, Netflix's vice president of original content. She worked with fellow ABC alums Shonda Rhimes and Kenya Barris at Netflix. She left Netflix in October 2020.

On October 19, 2020, it was announced that Dungey would succeed Peter Roth in the position of chairwoman of Warner Bros. Television Group, reporting to Ann Sarnoff. One of few Black executives running a Hollywood television studio, she is the first woman and first Black executive to lead WBTV.

On May 4, 2021, the Chicago Red Stars of the National Women's Soccer League announced that Dungey and her spouse Scott Power had joined the women's soccer team's ownership group.

After the April 2022 Merger of Discovery, Inc. and WarnerMedia; on August 16, 2024, it was announced that Dungey will succeed Kathleen Finch as chairwoman of Warner Bros. Discovery U.S. Networks, following Finch's retirement at year's end, making her the chair and CEO chairman and CEO of Warner Bros. Television Group and WBD US Networks, within the Warner Bros. Discovery group of companies, as of 2025.

Dungey has been listed annually among The Hollywood Reporter's "Women in Entertainment Power 100", since its 25th list of 2016, and to Variety's annual 500 Most Important People in Global Media, since it began in 2017. She received the Lucy Award for Excellence in Television from Women in Film in 2018, and stressed the necessity of role models such as those who've inspired her career: Lucy Fisher, Sherry Lansing, Gail Berman, Anne Sweeney and Oprah Winfrey.

== Personal life ==
Married to Scott Power since 2003, the couple have adopted daughter and son.

Dungey serves on the Motion Picture & Television Fund (MPTF) Board of Governors. She became an honorary member of Delta Sigma Theta sorority in 2023.
