= Alias season 4 =

Alias
- Season 4
- Season 4 DVD cover
- No. of episodes: 22

Release
- Original network: ABC
- Original release: January 5 – May 25, 2005

Season chronology
- ← Previous; Season 3 Next → Season 5

The fourth season of the American drama/adventure television series Alias premiered January 5, 2005 on ABC and concluded May 25, 2005 and was released on DVD in region 1 on October 25, 2005. Guest stars in season four include Sônia Braga, Joel Grey, Michael McKean, Lena Olin, and Isabella Rossellini.

Speaking of the previous season, J. J. Abrams said: "We weren't as true to the characters. They became pawns in a plot-driven story." He described the season as a year of "reinvention", which refocused on relationships.

Unlike all other seasons of the series, the fourth season aired entirely during the latter half of the American television season, allowing for a more continuous run. Only one Wednesday evening (February 2) was skipped in this run, so as not to coincide with the 2005 State of the Union Address from President George W. Bush.

The scheduling shift for the fourth season was prompted by displacement of the series from its previous time slot (Sundays 9:00 p.m. ET/8:00 p.m. CT), due to the success of Alias' fall replacement — season one of Desperate Housewives. ABC's other notable new series from the season, Lost, became the lead-in program for Alias. A new night, new lead-in, and noticeable lack of weeks without new episode broadcasts are thought to have contributed to some of the series' best overall ratings during its five-season run.

== Cast ==
=== Main ===
- Jennifer Garner as Sydney Bristow (22 episodes)
- Ron Rifkin as Arvin Sloane (21 episodes)
- Michael Vartan as Michael Vaughn (22 episodes)
- Carl Lumbly as Marcus Dixon (20 episodes)
- Kevin Weisman as Marshall Flinkman (21 episodes)
- Mía Maestro as Nadia Santos (21 episodes)
- Greg Grunberg as Eric Weiss (20 episodes)
- Victor Garber as Jack Bristow (22 episodes)

=== Recurring ===
- Sônia Braga as Elena Derevko (5 episodes)
- Angela Bassett as CIA Director Hayden Chase (4 episodes)
- Joel Grey as Corporal Ned Bolger (3 episodes)
- David Anders as Julian Sark (2 episodes)
- Lena Olin as Irina Derevko (2 episodes)
- Isabella Rossellini as Katya Derevko (2 episodes)
- Gina Torres as Anna Espinosa (2 episodes)
- Amanda Foreman as Carrie Bowman (1 episode)
- Melissa George as Lauren Reed (1 episode)
- Rob Benedict as Brodien (2 episodes)
- Amy Irving as Emily Sloane (1 episode)

== Episodes ==
No. overall	No. in season	Title	Directed by	Written by	Original release date	US viewers (millions)
67	1	"Authorized Personnel Only (Part 1)"	Ken Olin	J. J. Abrams & Jeff Melvoin	January 5, 2005	15.76
Sydney entices the Aurine-12 isotope away from Russian nuclear scientist Yuri Komorov. Fighting a thug, she holds onto cargo-strapping, dangling outside the speeding Belarus/Latvia train....Shanghai 72 Hours Earlier : Sydney and Brodien (Note: Rob Benedict as Brodien) run from agents, disguising themselves as ravers to escape. For "rogue behavior," CIA Director Hayden Chase strips Sydney's clearance, assigning her to Langley's mail-room. Sydney, "I quit." In D.C., Vaughn too wants to quit. Weiss urges, talk to Sydney first. Sydney enters the secret subway black-ops stronghold. Chase is, "glad you found us," and Brodien "has no idea it was a charade." Dixon, Jack and Vaughn are also "handpicked" for Sloane's team – their first mission, Komorov's isotope; their new name, Authorized Personnel Only. Presently : Carrying fake isotopes, Vaughn meets Vadik's buyer, Kazu Tamazaki, (Note: Rick Yune as Kazu Tamazaki) who recognizes Vaughn. He warns Sydney before dealing with a large Russian thug, then rescues her. Mission successful, they make love. Sloan identifies Ramon Vadik as #26 of CIA's "Most Wanted" assigning Sydney to debrief infiltrator, Nadia Santos. Sloan claims he gave Rambaldi's "Sphere of Life" to the government. Sydney realizes, "this position. You bought it." She's angry with Sloan, and Jack (after events in Wittenberg).
68	2	"Authorized Personnel Only (Part 2)"	Ken Olin	J. J. Abrams & Jeff Melvoin	January 5, 2005	15.76
In Argentina, Sydney asks Nadia for help, but Vadik beheaded her "good friend." Nadia names Vadik's lieutenant, Tomazaki, "a modern samurai." Sydney confides in Vaughn, Lauren Reed revealed "where to look...authority to execute Irina Derevko...granted." Jack, "killed my mother." Dixon recruits Marshall to help lure Tomazake with the coveted Shintaro samurai sword. Sydney steals the sword from the Hazunaga Asian Museum, London, but Cooney's (Note: Mark Ryan as Cooney) soda triggers alarms. Sydney flees police, rescued by Jack. In Brussels, Dixon advertises the sword through Lebeque. The large Russian Vaughn arrested identifies "Vadik" as Tomazaki's alias. In Rio, Tomazaki isolates Sydney in a deadzone, abducting her. Vaughn pleads for Nadia's help. Tomazaki water-tortures Sydney, wondering how she discovered the contract on her. Nadia tranq-kisses Jorge for his key-card to rescue Sydney. Tomazaki wields the Shintaro sword against Sydney's meat grip-hooks. Before he dies, she asks, "Who put a contract on my life?" Tomazaki, "Irina Derevko." Sydney realizes, Jack killed Irina to nullify Tomazaki's contract. "Why would she want me dead?" Jack, "I don't know." Nadia wants to "talk about our mother." They visit Moscow where Irina's interred. Sydney lies about knowing "who killed her?" Nadia vows to find and kill him.
69	3	"The Awful Truth"	Lawrence Trilling	Jesse Alexander	January 12, 2005	13.90
Sydney and Marshall impersonate a New Jersey couple to steal an untraceable account name from a Bahamas bank manager, (Note: Dayo Ade as Bank Manager) while Vaughn and Dixon create a diversion. Eric and Nadia flirt. Having joined APO, Nadia rooms with Sydney, who plans to reveal that Jack executed their mother. Sloane tasks APO to recover an NSA Valta computer stolen for German terrorist network Badenliga. Sydney masquerades as a distressed motorist, escaping her ex-boyfriend, to infiltrate the highly-secured Andalusian home of international arms dealer Martin Bishop. (Note: Peter O'Meara as Martin Bishop) She accesses his servers, locating the Valta at Alemeda Yards, Málaga. Weiss is captured after destroying it. Pierre alerts Bishop, endangering Sydney. Dixon and Vaughn can't find her; Marshall tracks them electronically. Jack psyche-tests Nadia's situational reactions, then provides a false CIA report. Out-of-the-loop, Weiss is surprised Sydney is doing black-ops. She frees herself with a laser watch, then frees Weiss. Thwarting escape, Sydney shoots Bishop, who plans to shoot her; Nadia fires three shots, saving Sydney.... then eight more, enraged. Sydney, "Is that how you normally deal with bad guys?" Nadia, "Bishop...killed our mother." Jack "adjusted some details." Sydney, "You manipulated Nadia." Jack, "closure." Sydney, "not the truth." Jack, "a satisfying lie" does "more good than the awful truth."
70	4	"Ice"	Jeffrey Bell	Jeffrey Bell	January 19, 2005	13.21
Vaughn goes undercover as a priest with a dark past. He and Sydney set out to intercept a bioweapon called Ice Five, similar to the Ice Nine in Kurt Vonnegut's novel Cat's Cradle (it causes the water in the body to crystallize instantly at room temperature). Vaughn still feels guilty over Lauren's death; he confesses his feelings with a sympathetic enemy and he bonds with her. Nadia has questions for Jack regarding her mother, Irina Derevko.
71	5	"Welcome to Liberty Village"	Kevin Hooks	Drew Goddard	January 26, 2005	11.68
Posing as Russian nationals, Vaughn and Sydney are brought to a "village" located in Russia that resembles a typical American town. It was once used to train KGB agents in how to blend into American society, but is now being used by a terrorist cell to train operatives in preparation for bringing down America's economy using an electromagnetic pulse weapon. Marshall discovers information in a book Irina Derevko used to contact her handlers. For some reason, some Russian group is trying to find Derevko.
72	6	"Nocturne"	Lawrence Trilling	Jeff Pinkner	February 9, 2005	10.80
Sydney comes in contact with an infectious drug and suffers deadly hallucinations. Dixon tells Arvin Sloane he suspects him of having a treacherous endgame and threatens to kill him when the time comes.
73	7	"Détente"	Craig Zisk	Monica Breen & Alison Schapker	February 16, 2005	9.60
Sydney expresses her full hatred for Sloane during a mission to intercept a cache of an extremely powerful explosive called Black Thorine.
74	8	"Echoes"	Dan Attias	André Nemec & Josh Appelbaum	February 23, 2005	9.74
Nadia tells Sydney she "hallucinated" from the "muscle-memory" elixir (described in "Legacy"); Nadia shot Sydney, but Sydney seems to have expected it. Former K-Directorate agent Anna Espinosa abducts Nadia, and issues her ransom demands. While Sydney follows instructions, Anna brands Nadia's neck with the <O> symbol of Rambaldi zealots. In Brussels, Sydney poses as a call girl to Willem Karg, (Note: Sebastian Roché as Willem Karg) dismembering his finger and faking photos to prove his execution, ordered by Milo Sabine (Note: William Morgan Sheppard as Milo Sabine) in exchange for Anna's package. Marshall identifies it; Dante compound a "super-rare phosphorus-based putty" that when mixed with VX nerve gas mutates neurotoxins which self-replicate exponentially. Marshall believes Anna's working for fringe terrorists, Cadmus Revolutionary Front; former Covenant. Sydney makes the exchange with Anna, recovering Nadia. Sydney explains, Rambaldi outer markings "<" and ">" represent Irina's two daughters, and the center "O" "the object over which they will do great battle...with each other." The Prophecy predicts they will fight to the death. They discover Anna's meeting in Estonia. Sloane warns the CRF will try to make the prophecy come true. Julian Sark, claiming to know about the CRF, tries cutting a deal. Sydney and Nadia go to intercept the exchange, but Anna shoots Nadia.
75	9	"A Man of His Word"	Marita Grabiak	Breen Frazier	March 2, 2005	9.69
Espinosa's bomb is assembled and ready for sale. Sark claims to be a man of his word and helps Sydney capture Espinosa while securing his own escape. Jack wakes Nadia prematurely to gain intel on the Cadmus Revolutionary Front. When Sloane confronts him, Jack claims to be a man of his word as well.
76	10	"The Index"	Lawrence Trilling	J. R. Orci & Alison Schapker	March 9, 2005	9.80
Sydney uses Nadia's birthday dinner as a pretext for stealing the key to Sloane's secure phone. Sydney and Dixon learn that Sloane has contacted old Alliance associates. The two conspire to give the CIA a corrupted key to an encrypted database—a master blackmail list. When Sloane arranges a meeting with his old associates, Jack presents them with the key to The Index. Jack is pistol-whipped when the key does not work. Nadia rescues him. Jack and Sloane finally gain access to the list. Vaughn receives a mysterious package from a mysterious 'fake nurse' while visiting his comatose uncle in the hospital. It contains a key that leads him to a journal written by his "late" father, which contains entries after the date of Vaughn's father's alleged death.
77	11	"The Road Home"	Maryann Brandon	André Nemec & Josh Appelbaum	March 16, 2005	8.50
Jack kills an old friend who is poised to receive a biometrically targeted weapon. Sydney confronts the weapon (miniature helicopter with automatic weapons fire and Artificial Intelligence) and saves an innocent civilian. Vaughn learns that his father was possibly a traitor.
78	12	"The Orphan"	Ken Olin	Jeffrey Bell & Monica Breen	March 23, 2005	6.76
Nadia's orphan past, her recruitment and her recruiter's treacherous background are revealed. In a search for his father, Vaughn meets up with none other than the headmistress of Nadia's orphanage in Argentina. Vaughn asks her if she remembers anything out of the ordinary when his father stayed at the orphanage, which she replied she said she heard him say something about "Nightingale". She asks about Nadia, also.
79	13	"Tuesday"	Frederick E. O. Toye	Drew Goddard & Breen Frazier	March 30, 2005	10.83
In Havana, Sydney pulls her informant Alex Rucker onto the dance floor. Paid in diamonds, he tells Dixon the HDD location. Her driver shot, Sydney's captured by Third Faction boss, Ulrich Kottor, (Note: Ulrich Thomsen as Ulrich Kottor) who shoots Rucker. The booby-trapped HDD releases cyclosarin towards Dixon; APO locks-down for thirty-six hours. Late to work, Marshall learns Sydney is trapped inside a coffin; he's the only one free to rescue her. Using a rigged transceiver, he locates her cellphone, and via re-tasked thermal imaging satellite, Marshall finds Sydney unconscious, but alive. He revives her with CPR. In Berlin, only Marshall can scan Kottor's PDA, as he's already seen Sydney. Marshall accidentally kills Kottor with his cellphone-gun. Jack instructs Marshall how to remove Kottor's eye using a spork, for retinal security access in the basement to penetrate a firewall. Sydney fights her way past Kottor's henchmen; Marshall hits one with a fire poker. They access the server, obtaining the real data, which they deliver to APO. Meanwhile over the phone, Marshall sings his baby to sleep with a Lanthanide series lullaby. Although his wife is with the NSA, he can never reveal his black-op. Sydney and Vaughn dance their first dance.
80	14	"Nightingale"	Lawrence Trilling	Breen Frazier	April 6, 2005	9.33
While searching for Vaughn's father, Vaughn and Sydney discover that Nightingale is a molecular manipulation weapon system located in a nuclear reactor in Siberia. Sloane and Jack know about Nightingale and its connection to Elena Derevko. The duo later use Sydney to have Vaughn bring the information to APO and thus make it an official mission. Meanwhile, a mysterious stranger, Roberts, meets with Vaughn in the UCLA library and promises answers about his father in exchange for the Nightingale's coil. Vaughn, Sydney and Jack travel to the Nightingale facility to shut it down and retrieve the coil from the weapon, however, Sydney becomes trapped in the room with the Nightingale device. From three different locations, Jack, Vaughn and Marshall attempt to free her. Ultimately Jack shuts down the nuclear core manually exposing himself to harmful radiation. With Sydney's help, Vaughn disappears with the coil to learn more about his father. Marshall discovers what Jack did, but swears to keep Jack's secret.
81	15	"Pandora"	Kevin Hooks	J. R. Orci & Jeff Pinkner	April 13, 2005	7.44
Michael Vaughn deals with Roberts to intercept a CIA shipment of a Rambaldi manual in exchange for information on whether Michael's father Bill Vaughn is still alive. To succeed, Michael is forced to shoot Dixon. Nadia reveals to Sydney that she's been secretly visiting Katya Derevko in prison. Confronted, Katya contradicts Jack; Irina did not contract an assassin to kill Sydney. She finds Irina's hidden message in a music box; a numbered bank account in Arvin Sloane's name. Marshall dupes Jack into signing medical authorization; testing positive for Nightingale mutations, Marshall confronts Jack about how it'll affects people who care about him, insisting he see a doctor. After mission success, Vaughn learns his father really is dead, and the journal was supposedly forged by Sloane. Jack reports to Sloane that Vaughn returned with the Nightingale coil, and that the CIA still possesses the Rambaldi manual. Dixon, protected by his vest, is recovering from being shot. In Santiago, an operative reports to a different Mr. Sloane (Note: Joel Grey as Another Mr. Sloane) that, "We haven't recovered the manuscript, and Roberts hasn't reported in."
82	16	"Another Mister Sloane"	Greg Yaitanes	Luke McMullen	April 20, 2005	8.08
Physicist Professor Maggie Sinclair, (Note: Michelle Forbes as Maggie Sinclair) a specialist in Quantum Electrodynamics, is abducted in Kraków. Arvin Sloane convinces everyone that an impostor is responsible for the recent activities. In custody, Roberts contacts "Arvin Clone's" second in command Carter to arrange a meeting to deliver the Nightingale coil, vital to what "Marvin Sloane" is building. But the meeting goes awry. Roberts is killed, and "Marvin" escapes with stolen the coil. After promising Nadia that he is trust-worthy, Sloane is allowed into DSR to examine Rambaldi artifacts to deduce "Marvin's" next move; Sloane concludes, "I know what he's doing." He contacts Ignacio, from whom "Marvin" ordered Zanthium 242, (Note: Zanthium 242 is a fictional chemical element.) to discover "Marvin's" location in Chile. Sydney and the APO team rescues Maggie. "Arvin Clone" escapes, abandoning his full-scale operational Rambaldi Circumference (aka "Mueller") device (as seen in "Almost Thirty Years"), which fascinates Sloane. Carter mistakes Sloane as his imposter boss. Sloane shoots Carter for not understanding "what...you're doing...you fool." Carter was told he "could live forever." Sloane bludgeons Carter to death, "Is that what you think...Immortality? You bought the rumor, you simple-minded dilettante! A mystery. The true secrets of these creations will always be held back from you, The Unworthy!" Nadia finds Arvin, blood-spattered.
83	17	"A Clean Conscience"	Lawrence Trilling	J. R. Orci	April 27, 2005	8.19
Jack seeks a doctor who might be able to cure his radiation poisoning, but the doctor cannot help him and tells Jack that he must tell Sydney. Sophia, Nadia's caretaker when she was young, calls her and she comes to Los Angeles. She reveals that she was beaten when someone came to look for Nadia. Meanwhile, Vaughn and Dixon go on a mission in Amsterdam to find an agent who might have gone rogue. Dixon's associate is actually pursuing leads on Hydrosek, a water-based weapon developed by Indonesia that could wipe out entire ecosystems and kill millions. Sloane (via Marshall) acquires intel on Sophia just to be sure she was telling the truth, but Sydney finds out. Jack and Sloane later confess that they know that someone has been watching Sydney and Nadia since they were young and acquiring information about them. It is revealed that Elena Derevko is the one who has been accumulating the information. It is then shown that Sophia and Elena are one and the same.
84	18	"Mirage"	Brad Turner	Steven Kane	May 4, 2005	9.16
In Vienna, Sydney delivers drinks to Milos Kradic and Dixon. An unknown operative with glasses triggers explosives, intercepting Hydrosek delivery. Sydney fights glasses-guy, who escapes. Dixon shoots Kradic, preventing Hydrosek release into drinking water pipes. Glasses-guy reports failure to Elena. Jack disappears; Sydney and Vaughn find he's been self-medicating alkylating agents for radiation remediation. Nadia gives Marshall an artist's sketch of glasses-guy, unaware Sophia-Elena bugged her pendant. Jack visits Dr. Liddell with more alkylating agent obtained from Anthony. Learning Jack's condition from Marshall, Sydney and Vaughn track him down; seems Jack was hallucinating Liddell. Glasses-guy hacks Nadia's laptop for the Hydrosek file. At the hospital, Jack thinks Sydney is his wife. Sloane suggests Sydney take another alias, Laura, to discover where Jack relocated radiation therapy specialist Dr. Atticus Liddell in 1981. A set is dressed, recreating Jack's 1981 home, and a child actress portrays young Sydney. To "Laura," Jack reveals he'll relocate Liddell to Finland, and quit to be home with Sydney, who's more important than his CIA job. Sydney brings Liddell from Helsinki to APO to treat Jack. Elena has the Hydrosek relocated off-site through Nadia's logon. She kills glasses-guy, escaping with the weapon.
85	19	"In Dreams..."	Jennifer Garner	Jon Robin Baitz	May 11, 2005	9.84
"Arvin Clone" raids a monastery for a Rambaldi orchid from which an anti-aggression drug can be made, an effect which the Mueller Device can reverse, turning infected subjects into violent, mindless berserkers. In CIA custody he displays Sloane's memories, the product of an SD-6 psy-ops specialist's experiment. The real Sloane had contaminated world water supplies when he was with OmniFam, and with the orchid; "Sloane Clone's" employer can now render hundreds of millions passive, finishing what Sloane failed to do. The team decides to break the imposter by imprinting him with Sloan's most painful memory—the very thing that sparked his Rambaldi obsession. Within his memory, Sloane recalls his wife Emily's pregnancy, when his baby Jacquelyn died at birth. Confronted by the traumatic memory, "Sloane Clone" breaks and reveals himself as U.S. Army Corporal Ned Bolger, who says the flower is at a warehouse in Lugano, Switzerland. Arvin Sloane must decide whether to return to Nadia and repair the damage he has done to the world, or live in an alternate dreamworld where Emily and Jacquelyn live.
86	20	"The Descent"	Jeffrey Bell	Jeffrey Bell	May 18, 2005	8.86
Elena Derevko raids the DSR facility holding all the CIA's Rambaldi devices. The CIA traces the conspiracy back to Nadia's laptop and the bugged necklace Sophia Vargas (who was Elena Derevko all along) gave her. In a flashback Arvin Sloane and Nadia Santos visit the one man who knows how to assemble the Rambaldi device. The man is subsequently killed by Elena. When Sloane and Sydney arrive at the man's trailer they find him murdered. Sloane then betrays the CIA by knocking Sydney out and fleeing with the knowledge of Elena's location. Since Sloane is the only living expert on Rambaldi, they join forces. To find Elena and Sloane, Jack Bristow visits Katya Derevko and promises her immunity for information on Elena's whereabouts which she then gives to Jack. Dixon, Nadia, and Sydney then infiltrate Elena's compound, where Dixon is shot by Elena, but not before positively identifying that Irina Derevko, long thought to be executed by Jack, is still alive.
87	21	"Search and Rescue"	Lawrence Trilling	Monica Breen & Alison Schapker	May 18, 2005	8.86
The episode begins with a flashback in which Jack executes Irina 18 months prior. It was, however, not Irina who was killed and instead a double from the Project Helix. It is learned that Irina's death was an elaborate setup by Elena Derevko in which Jack was meant to execute the double to make everyone believe she was dead. The information on the double is confirmed through an encrypted file called the Blackwell File (retrieved in an earlier episode). With the knowledge that Irina was still alive, Jack, Sydney, and Nadia stage a search and rescue in Guatemala where Irina was being held. While all this is going on, a device known as the Mueller Device (Marshall calls it the Big Red Ball) is put into place over Sovogda, Russia, the entire population of which is rioting much like the frenzied bees from In Dreams.... The Rambaldi prophecy appears to be coming true and only Irina has the knowledge to foil Elena and Sloane's plot. The team makes a HALO jump into Sovogda in an attempt to shut down the Mueller Device. The Russian authorities have ordered an airstrike, but since rupturing the sphere would release a vast amount of toxins, time is running out.
88	22	"Before the Flood"	Lawrence Trilling	Josh Appelbaum & André Nemec	May 25, 2005	10.08
The team parachutes into Sovogda; most citizens are dead. Of the DSR team, only Brodien survived, saying the Mueller device is atop the Oransky Building. Irina knows the Nightingale Coil powers it. Sydney proposes taking the subway, avoiding orchid-water-infected berserkers. A spotter reports them to Elena and Sloane. Irina spots a horse, red-tinged by the device, recalling part of Rambaldi's Prophecy. "When blood-red horses run through the streets and angels fall from the sky, The Chosen One and The Passenger will clash, and only one of them will survive." — Milo Rambaldi, The Prophecy (excerpt) Brodien is killed by the infected. Using the Blackwell Index, Marshall and Weiss extort Deputy Defense Minister Karkov for codes to cancel the Russian Air Force tactical strike, but Elena plans to re-task Russia's MilSat network to broadcast Mueller signals worldwide. The infected swarm Nadia as Sydney's subway-car speeds away. Sloan kills Elena's hit-squad, saving Sydney's team. Nadia is captured; Elena infects her. Vaughn proposes marriage to Sydney. Sloane leads Jack's team to Elena. Infected, Nadia battles Sydney on the roof. Irina kills Elena after surmising the correct wire to cut. Sloane shoots Nadia, saving Sydney. The team escapes. The "Big Red Ball" collapses, flooding and destroying the building. Jack allows Irina's escape. Season epilogue : Vaughn drives Sydney to Santa Barbara, where they decide to elope. Having been prompted by Irina to remain truthful with Sydney in marriage (unlike how Irina treated Jack), Vaughn reveals "it's no accident" that he become her handler (in "Truth Be Told"), and his real name isn't Michael Vaughn, it's....Before he can continue, another vehicle crashes into the driver's side door.

== Home release ==
The 6-DVD box set of Season 4 was released in region 1 format (US) on October 25, 2005, in region 2 format (UK) on November 21, 2005 and in region 4 format (AU) on January 16, 2006. The DVDs contain all episodes of Season 4, plus the following features:

- Original "Nocturne" episode featuring the unaired Russian Roulette scene
- Agent Weiss: Spy Camera – a narrated slideshow of digital photos taken behind the scenes by Greg Grunberg
- Audio Commentaries with Cast and Crew
- A Chat with Jennifer Garner
- Meet Mia: Syd's Little Sister
- Marshall's World – a comedic behind-the-scenes tour hosted by Kevin Weisman
- The Guest Stars of Season 4
- ALIAS Blooper Reel
- Director's Diary
- Anatomy of a Scene
- Deleted Scenes
