= Short-range agent communications =

Communication devices used for intelligence purposes

Short range agent communications (SRAC) are one-way or two-way short-range wireless communications used for intelligence purposes. This communications technology became possible with the arrival of the transistor and small scale integrated circuits. In the late 2000s computer Wi-Fi technology and USB flash drives had evolved into technologies that ordinary people can buy – yet can be used in a similar way to SRAC systems.

SRAC devices were adopted by Western intelligence agencies during the Cold War in the 1960s, but Eastern Bloc nations possessed and used similar technologies. The devices are miniature to ease concealment, and are capable of transmitting encrypted data.

== Historical context ==
Examples of a US-made set, the CDS-501, were captured in Cuba and are thought to have seen use in Central and Eastern Europe. The device operated in the upper part of the VHF band and sent high speed bursts of encrypted data from an agent to a receiving station located within a Western diplomatic facility in a hostile country to avoid interception by the adversary signals intelligence service.

A high-grade US intelligence source in Cold War Poland, Colonel Ryszard Kukliński, is believed to have been using an SRAC device shortly before his defection to the West in late 1981. Another SRAC device's nomenclature was RT-519, which operated in the VHF spectrum.

Former British intelligence officer Richard Tomlinson mentioned SRAC devices of a cigarette pack size in his book The Big Breach: From Top Secret To Maximum Security. The text of a message was first typed on a computer and then uploaded into the SRAC device. When an agent came within the range of the interrogating signals from the receiving station, usually mounted within British diplomatic posts, the device instantly transmitted its message.

== Since 2000 ==
In 2006 Russian authorities accused Britain of conducting spy operations in Moscow and exposed an artificial rock, which housed an electronic dead drop allegedly used by British assets in Russia. The device likely exchanged short bursts of data with PDA computers in the possession of the assets.
