= Merrin Dungey =

American actress (born 1971)

- Born: Merrin Melissa Dungey; August 6, 1971 (age 55); Sacramento, California, U.S.
- Education: Rio Americano High School
- Occupation: Actress
- Years active: 1995–present
- Spouses: Matthew Drake (m. 2007; div. 2021) Kevin Ryder (m. 2023)
- Children: 2
- Relatives: Channing Dungey (sister)

Merrin Melissa Dungey (born August 6, 1971) is an American film and television actress, known for her roles on the television series The King of Queens, Alias, Malcolm in the Middle, Summerland, Conviction, The Resident and The Fix. She also appeared as Ursula on Once Upon a Time. From 2022 to 2023, Dungey played series regular Kam in Shining Vale.

== Early life and education ==
Dungey, who is of African-American heritage, was born and raised in Sacramento, California. As a child, she was active in ballet and dance as well as piano. Dungey was also an accomplished ice skater. Dungey graduated in 1989 from Rio Americano High School in Sacramento, California. After high school, Dungey earned a degree of Bachelor of Arts from UCLA in 1993. Dungey has a sister, Channing Dungey who was president of ABC Entertainment and is the CEO of Warner Bros. Television Studios.

== Career ==
Dungey had small roles in Hollywood films such as EDtv and Deep Impact and on television series such as Martin, before landing the recurring role of Kelly Palmer on the CBS television series The King of Queens, in which she starred from 1999 to 2007. She appeared in each season of the series except for the 2002–03 season. Dungey is also well known for her role as Francie Calfo on the drama series Alias from 2001 to 2003, as well as making an appearance on the 2006 series finale episode All the Time in the World. She also had a recurring role on the FOX sitcom Malcolm in the Middle as Stevie's mother, Kitty Kenarban. At one point in 2001, Dungey was appearing in all three shows (The King of Queens, Malcolm in the Middle, and Alias) at the same time. Dungey portrayed Susannah in the WB drama series Summerland from 2004 to 2005. She has also guest-starred on various TV series including Living Single, ER, Murphy Brown, Seinfeld, Friends, The West Wing, Babylon 5, and Curb Your Enthusiasm. Dungey appeared in two episodes of Grey's Anatomy that served as a backdoor pilot for Private Practice, but was replaced by actress Audra McDonald for the series.

Dungey guest-starred on the ABC sitcoms Surviving Suburbia starring Bob Saget, Better Off Ted starring Portia de Rossi, Castle starring Nathan Fillion, and HBO's Hung starring Thomas Jane. She portrayed Ellie on the Nick at Nite television series Hollywood Heights in 2012 and had a recurring role as Alissa Barnes on ABC's Betrayal in 2013. In 2014 she appeared in a featured role opposite Pierce Brosnan in Some Kind of Beautiful. Also in 2014, she began portraying the recurring roles of Ursula on ABC's Once Upon a Time and Sharon Jeffords on Brooklyn Nine-Nine. Dungey played investigator Maxine Bohen on the ABC legal drama Conviction from October 2016 to May 2017. In September 2017, she joined the cast of the medical drama The Resident as Claire Thorpe. Dungey next appeared as C.J. Bernstein in the ABC legal drama The Fix.

In February 2021, Dungey was cast in the series regular role of Kam in the Starz series Shining Vale. The series premiered in March 2022, and was later picked up for a second season in May 2022.

== Personal life ==
In May 2007, Dungey married Matthew Drake in a mariachi-style wedding ceremony in Cancun, Mexico. She gave birth to their first daughter in June 2008, and a son in 2011. Dungey and Drake separated in 2018 and divorced in 2021. In 2023, Dungey announced her engagement to Kevin Ryder, a member of the Radio Hall of Fame and NAB Broadcasting Hall of Fame for his work on Kevin and Bean. They married on December 31, 2023.

== Filmography ==
=== Film ===
Year	Film	Role	Notes
1998	Deep Impact	Sheila Bradley	
1999	EDtv	Ms. Seaver	
2000	The Sky Is Falling	Sheila	
2001	Odessa or Bust	Disgruntled Diner	Short
2002	Scream at the Sound of the Beep	Jill	
2006	Beyond	Debbie Sprague	TV movie
2009	Masterwork	Rachel West	TV movie
2011	L!fe Happens	Hester	
2014	Some Kind of Beautiful	Angela	
2015	The Diabolical	Mrs. Dana Wallace	
2015	48 Hours 'til Monday	Mary Johansson	TV movie
2017	CHiPs	Joy Jackson	
2017	Brothered Up	Desiree Williams	TV movie
2020	Greenland	Major Breen	
2021	The Madness Inside Me	Madison	

=== Television ===
Year	Film	Role	Notes
1995	Martin	Monique	Episode: "Girlfriend"
1996	Babylon 5	Security Guard #2	Episode: "Messages from Earth"
1996	Living Single	Laura	Episode: "Woman to Woman"
1996	Party Girl	Wanda	Main cast
1997	Caroline in the City	Female Prostitute	Episode: "Caroline and the Buyer"
1997	ER	Daphina	Episode: "When the Bough Breaks"
1997	Murphy Brown	Woman	Episode: "From the Terrace"
1998	Seinfeld	Cashier	Episode: "The Bookstore"
1999	Tracey Takes On...	Nancy	Episode: "Drugs"
1999	Saved by the Bell: The New Class	Coach Williams	Episode: "Prescription for Trouble"
1999	The West Wing	Daisy	Episode: "Post Hoc, Ergo Propter Hoc"
1999	G vs E	Rebecca Clemens	Episode: "Cliffhanger"
1999–2007	The King of Queens	Kelly Palmer	Recurring cast
2000	Jesse	Rosemary	Episode: "Kurt Slips, Niagara Falls"
2000	City of Angels	Mrs. Lombard	Episode: "Deliver the Male"
2000	Friends	The Museum Official	Episode: "The One Where Paul's the Man"
2000–01	Grosse Pointe	Joan	Recurring cast
2000–04	Malcolm in the Middle	Kitty Kenarban	Guest: Seasons 1 & 3 & 6, Recurring cast: Season 2
2001	Curb Your Enthusiasm	Amy	Episode: "The Doll"
2001–06	Alias	Francie Calfo / Allison Doren	Main cast: Season 1-2, Recurring cast: Season 3, guest: Season 5
2004–05	Summerland	Susannah Rexford	Main cast
2007	Boston Legal	Sandy Zionts	Episode: "Angel of Death"
2007	Grey's Anatomy	Dr. Naomi Bennett	Episode: "The Other Side of This Life, Part 1 & 2"
2009	Surviving Suburbia	Mrs. Devore	Episode: "Nothing for Money"
2009–10	Better Off Ted	Sheila	Guest: Season 1, Recurring cast: Season 2
2010	Castle	Monica Finch	Episode: "Den of Thieves"
2010	The Closer	Ms. Reed	Episode: "Heart Attack"
2010	Hung	Liz	Recurring cast: Season 2
2010	Outlaw	Alison Mills	Episode: "In Re: Curtis Farwell"
2012	Revenge	Barbara Snow	Recurring cast: Season 1
2012	Hollywood Heights	Ellie Moss	Recurring cast
2013	90210	Court Appointed Therapist	Episode: "Brother From Another Mother"
2013	How to Live with Your Parents	Morgan	Episode: "How to Have a Playdate" & "How to Be Gifted"
2013	Betrayal	Alissa Barnes	Recurring cast
2014	Episodes	Tonight Show Producer	Episode: "Episode Four"
2014	Trophy Wife	Agent Dawn Johansen	Episode: "The Wedding, Part 1"
2014	Shameless	Nurse	Episode: "Lazarus"
2014	Rizzoli & Isles	Gwen Miller	Episode: "It Takes a Village"
2014	CSI: Crime Scene Investigation	Twyla Owens	Episode: "Road to Recovery"
2014–15	Once Upon a Time	Ursula	Recurring cast: Season 4
2014–15	Chasing Life	Dr. Susan Hamburg	Recurring cast
2014–15	Brooklyn Nine-Nine	Sharon Jeffords	Guest: Seasons 1-2, Recurring cast: Season 3
2015	Backstrom	Eleanor Deering	Episode: "Enemy of My Enemies"
2016	Con Man	Jess	Episode: "What Goes Up..."
2016–17	Conviction	Maxine Bohen	Main cast
2017	You're the Worst	Candace	Recurring cast: Season 4
2017–19	Big Little Lies	Detective Adrienne Quinlan	Recurring cast
2018	The Resident	Claire Thorpe	Main cast: Season 1
2019	Grace and Frankie	Elena	Episode: "The Highs"
2019	The Fix	C.J. Bernstein	Main cast
2020	Star Trek: Picard	Interviewer	Episode: "Remembrance"
2020	Man with a Plan	Dr. Felicia	Episode: "Couples Therapy" & "Adam's Not Sorry"
2020–present	Star Trek: Lower Decks	Solvang First Officer/Ensign Wendy (voice)	2 episodes
2021	Bad Vibes	Melinda	Episode: "Shifter"
2021	American Horror Stories	Dr. Andi Grant	Recurring cast: Season 1
2021	Lucifer	Officer Sonja Harris	Recurring cast: Season 6
2021	Bob's Burgers	Judith (voice)	Episode: "Driving Big Dummy"
2022–23	Shining Vale	Kam	Main cast
2024	S.W.A.T.	Deputy Chief Leticia Bennett	Recurring cast
2024	The Lincoln Lawyer	Judge Regina Turner	Recurring cast (Season 3)
2025–26	Chicago Med	Dr. Jennifer Kingston	6 episodes (Season 11)
2026	Malcolm in the Middle: Life's Still Unfair	Kitty Kenarban	1 episode
TBA	In Between	TBA	
