= Unruhe =

- The X-Files episode
- The psychic photograph. A majority of the episode is spent discovering the purpose or meaning behind the mysterious image.
- Episode no.: Season 4 Episode 4
- Directed by: Rob Bowman
- Written by: Vince Gilligan
- Production code: 4X02
- Original air date: October 27, 1996
- Running time: 44 minutes

Guest appearances
- Pruitt Taylor Vince as Gerry Schnauz; Sharon Alexander as Mary Lefante; Scott Heindl as Boyfriend; Walter Marsh as Druggist; Angela Donahue as Alice Brandt; William MacDonald as Officer Trott; Ron Chartier as Postal Inspector Puett; Bob Dawson as Iskenderian; Michael Cram as Officer Corning; Christopher Royal as Photo Tech; Michele Melland as ER Doctor; John D. Sampson as Second Cop

Episode chronology
← Previous "Teliko"	Next → "The Field Where I Died"
- The X-Files season 4

"Unruhe" is the fourth episode of the fourth season of the American science fiction television series The X-Files. It originally aired on the Fox network in the United States on October 27, 1996, and was the first episode to air on Sunday night when the show was moved from Fridays to Sundays. "Unruhe" was written by Vince Gilligan, directed by Rob Bowman, and featured a guest appearance from Pruitt Taylor Vince. The episode is a "Monster-of-the-Week" story, unconnected to the series' wider mythology. "Unruhe" earned a Nielsen rating of 11.7, being watched by 19.10 million people upon its initial broadcast.

The show centers on FBI special agents Fox Mulder (David Duchovny) and Dana Scully (Gillian Anderson) who work on cases linked to the paranormal, called X-Files. In this episode, Mulder and Scully investigate a man who kidnaps women and lobotomizes them. The agents' only clues to catching him are distorted photos of the victims taken just before their kidnapping.

Gilligan wrote the episode after being inspired by stories of serial killers he read as a child. Other inspirations include the concept of thought-photographs, and common fears associated with dentist chairs. The episode received a generally positive reception, though critics criticized the plotline featuring Scully being kidnapped. Critical attention also expressed a positive opinion of how scary the episode was in nature. Guest actor Taylor Vince received positive reviews as the episode's antagonist.

== Plot ==
In Traverse City, Michigan, Mary Lefante goes to a local pharmacy to get her passport photo taken. Realizing she has forgotten her wallet, she returns to her car and finds that her boyfriend has been murdered. The killer, clad in a hooded raincoat, renders Lefante unconscious with a hypodermic needle, then kidnaps her. Meanwhile, in the pharmacy, the elderly clerk peels open the Polaroid photo, which shows her screaming amidst a distorted background.

Fox Mulder (David Duchovny) and Dana Scully (Gillian Anderson) are assigned to the case. Discussing the photograph, Mulder tells Scully about Ted Serios, a psychic photographer who was famous for making photos which showed what was in his mind. He takes pictures of his gloved hand using a Polaroid camera found in Lefante's apartment, and they all appear the same as the one from the pharmacy. Mulder deduces that the kidnapper has been stalking his victims and is capable of psychic photography.

Lefante is found wandering on a roadside, but appears to have been given an improperly-performed lobotomy. Another woman, Alice Brandt, is later kidnapped. She wakes up bound to a dentist's chair, with her kidnapper brandishing an ice pick and speaking in German. Mulder returns to Washington, D.C., to digitally analyze the photos and finds no evidence that they were doctored. By closely examining the photos, he finds the face of an old man as well as the shadow of the kidnapper, who appears to be extremely tall or have abnormally long legs.

Scully investigates a possible lead and meets Gerry Schnauz (Pruitt Taylor Vince), a sheetrock installer who worked near both crime scenes. She fields a call from Mulder and, after hearing what he found in the photos, realizes Schnauz, who is wearing plasterer's stilts that make him tall, is the suspect. Schnauz attempts to flee while wearing the stilts, but Scully pursues and arrests him. The agents interrogate Schnauz, who was once institutionalized for beating his abusive father with an axe handle. When questioned about Brandt's location, Schnauz claims she is safe from the "howlers", supposedly malicious spirits inhabiting the frontal lobe of people and force them to lie or otherwise deny their existence. Brandt is soon found in the woods, lobotomized. Mulder believes that Schnauz thinks he is rescuing his victims from howlers and that the photos show his nightmares.

Schnauz escapes police custody by killing an officer and then robs the pharmacy from the opening, taking the passport photo camera, film and an assortment of drug-related materials. While investigating the robbery, Scully is rendered unconscious and kidnapped by Schnauz. Mulder heads to the office where Schnauz's father used to work as a dentist, finding the exam chair missing. Scully awakens bound to the chair with Schnauz claiming he's going to kill the howlers in her head. Schnauz takes a photo of himself, the results of which greatly disturb him, then prepares to lobotomize Scully.

Mulder, having found a clue in a photo of Scully from the drugstore's photo booth, finds a construction site near Schnauz's father's grave and realizes the RV parked there belongs to the younger Schnauz. He manages to break in and shoot Schnauz before he can attack Scully. Mulder looks at the photo Schnauz took of himself, in which he is lying dead on the floor. A diary is then discovered among Schnauz's things, and it includes a list of the women he intended to save: Mary Lefante, Alice Brandt, and Agent Scully.

== Production ==
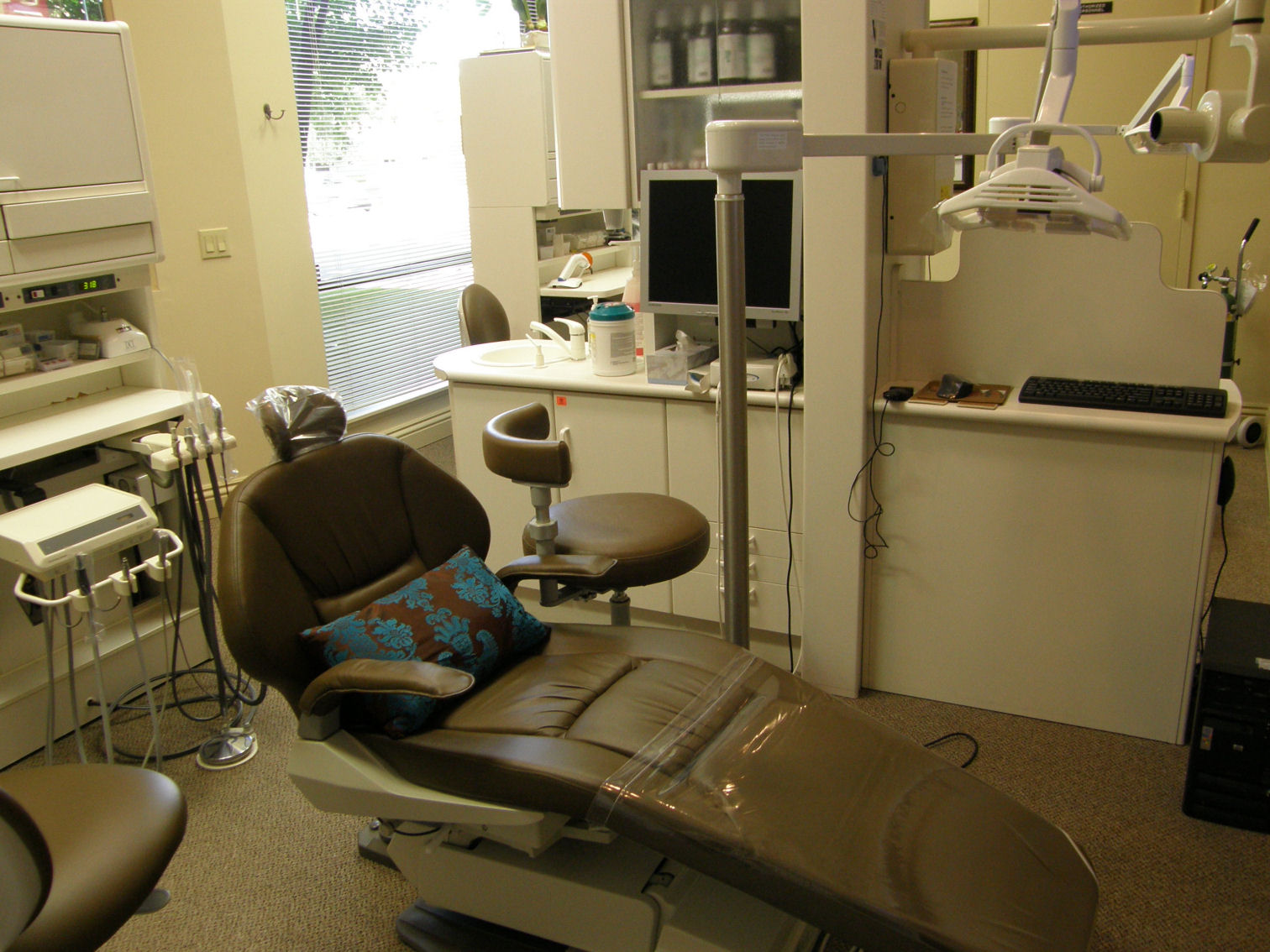
A dentistry chair was prominently featured in the episode because Vince Gilligan thought most people had a natural fear of going to the dentist.

The inspiration for "Unruhe" was a Time-Life book about serial killers that episode writer Vince Gilligan had read when he was a child; Gilligan, in particular, was struck by the story of Howard Unruh, who shot and killed 13 people (including three children) during a 12-minute walk through his neighborhood on September 6, 1949, in Camden, New Jersey. The episode was also inspired by Ted Serios, whose "thoughtography" is mentioned by Fox Mulder in the episode. Gilligan had written the role of Schnauz with Taylor Vince in mind when he saw him in the Adrian Lyne film Jacob's Ladder (1990). Vince had actually been offered a role on the show during its first season, but he declined at the time because it was "too small" a part. The idea to have Schnauz sit his victims in a dentist chair was added to the script due to widespread dental fear among the general American population.

Most of the scenes featuring Schnauz on plasterer's stilts were shot using stuntmen. In the scene where Scully meets Schnauz, a cable was attached to Vince to keep him upright on the stilts; this cord was then edited out in post-production. Props master Ken Hawryliw was forced to create his own leucotome after failing to secure a real one from a hospital. The title of the episode, "Unruhe", is the German word for "unease" or "disquiet". When Scully talks in German to Schnauz, she says "Ich habe keine Unruhe" (literally "I have no unease"). The episode prominently features the drug scopolamine which can cause people to quickly become unconscious, and twilight sleep, which is a condition that can render people unconscious following great moments of pain.

== Broadcast and reception ==
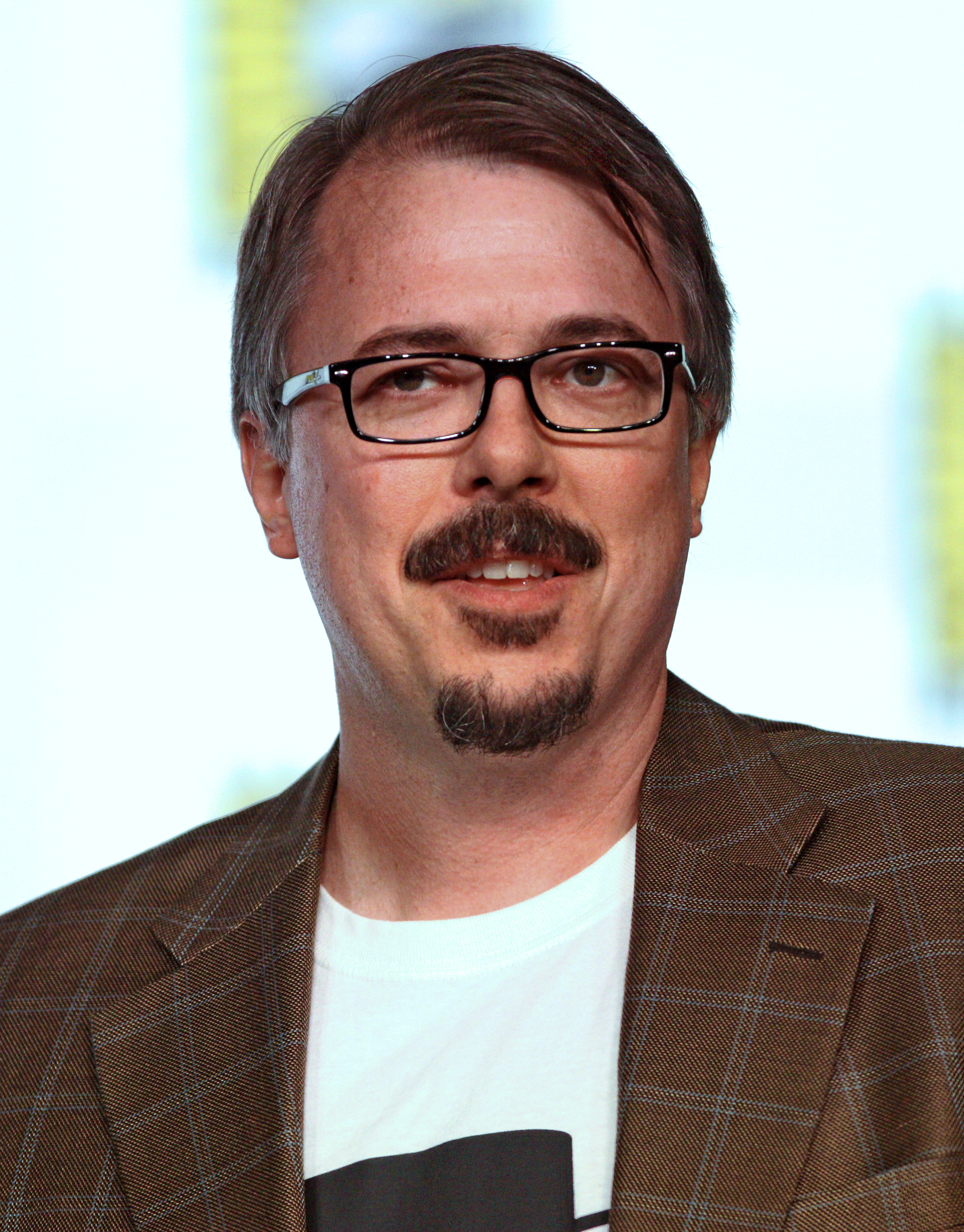
Vince Gilligan's writing received positive reviews.

"Unruhe" premiered on the Fox network on October 27, 1996. This episode earned a Nielsen rating of 11.7, with an 18 share, meaning that roughly 11.7 percent of all television-equipped households, and 18 percent of households watching television, were tuned in to the episode. It was viewed by 19.10 million people. This episode was broadcast out of order in the series' production schedule as once the producers of the show knew that they would be moving to Sundays starting with the fourth episode of the season, they decided to push this episode back, feeling that it would be an excellent representative of the show for its first Sunday night episode and a better representative than the fourth episode of the season filmed, "Teliko".

Entertainment Weekly gave the episode a "C", feeling that the "interesting concept" of the psychic photographs was ruined by "boilerplate Scully-in-distress shtick". Emily VanDerWerff of The A.V. Club was more positive, grading it as a "B+". She felt that its "greatest virtue" was being terrifying and that it worked for being an "urban fairytale". However, she criticized it for putting Scully in danger.

Taylor Vince's performance as Gerry Schnauz received positive critical attention. Writer Barbara Barnett in her book Chasing Zebras stated that he was memorable as a "psychotic killer". John Kenneth Muir in his book Horror Films of the 1990s wrote that Taylor Vince portrayed one of the "memorable and frightening serial killers" of the series. In a later book, Terror Television American Series 1970–1999, Muir praised the episode as a whole, writing that the episode "is nightmare provoking because it subjects a wonderful individual to a terrifying situation which will remove all traces of individuality from that character". Television Without Pity ranked "Unruhe" the sixth-most nightmare-inducing episode of the show.

== Bibliography ==
- Barnett, Barbara (2010). Chasing Zebras: The Unofficial Guide to House, M.D. Harper Prism.
- Gradnitzer, Louisa; Pittson, Todd (1999). X Marks the Spot: On Location with The X-Files. Arsenal Pulp Press. ISBN 9781551520667.
- Kenneth Muir, John (2001). Terror Television American Series 1970–1999. McFarland & Company.
- Kenneth Muir, John (2007). Horror Films of the 1990s. Virgin Books.
- Meisler, Andy (1998). I Want to Believe: The Official Guide to the X-Files Volume 3. Harper Prism. ISBN 9780061053863.
- Soter, Tom (2001). Investigating Couples: A Critical Analysis of the Thin Man, the Avengers and the X-Files. McFarland & Company.
