= JLA: Tower of Babel =

2000 comic book storyline that ran in the DC Comics monthly series

- Cover of JLA: Tower of Babel (2001, trade paperback edition), art by Howard Porter.
- Publisher: DC Comics
- Publication date: July – October 2000
- Genre: Superhero
- Title(s): JLA #43–46

Creative team
- Writer: Mark Waid
- Penciller(s): Howard Porter; Steve Scott
- Inker(s): Drew Geraci; Mark Propst
- Colorist: John Kalisz

"JLA: Tower of Babel" is a comic book storyline that ran in the DC Comics monthly series JLA in issues 43–46, beginning in July of 2000. It was written by Mark Waid.

== Summary ==
"Tower of Babel" deals with Batman's perceived betrayal of the superhuman community by keeping and concealing hidden records concerning the strengths and weaknesses of his allies in the JLA, which include plans to neutralize his allies in a fight. His files are stolen by the criminal mastermind Ra's al Ghul, who uses them to defeat the League through a coordinated attack in order to prevent them from interfering with his latest scheme toward reduction of the global population.

=== League Defeats ===
- Martian Manhunter is covered with nanites that convert the outer layer of his skin into magnesium, causing him to burst into flames (fire being his greatest weakness) upon exposure to air.
- Plastic Man is frozen with liquid nitrogen and then shattered.
- Aquaman is rendered aquaphobic due to an altered form of the Scarecrow's fear toxin. Without water, he would die in a matter of hours.
- Green Lantern (Kyle Rayner) is rendered blind by his own power ring from a post-hypnotic suggestion introduced during the REM phase and the ring placed on him while he was asleep. Kyle is unable to function without his vision to guide the ring's power, but he is able to overcome the post-hypnotic suggestion after his ring is temporarily removed and the methods behind the attack are explained to him.
- As a result of a nanite injected into her ear, Wonder Woman is trapped in a virtual reality battle against an opponent whom she cannot defeat and is her equal in every way. Her refusal to surrender under any circumstance would eventually cause her to tire herself out and die of exhaustion.
- A specially designed "vibra-bullet" strikes Flash in the back of the neck, causing him to experience seizures at light speed.
- Superman's skin becomes transparent after exposure to Red Kryptonite, causing him to feel intense pain as well as overloading his natural solar absorption to the point where his super senses become overwhelmed. Red Kryptonite is an artificial creation of Batman's made by exposing a Green Kryptonite sample to radiation, developed in the event that he needs to incapacitate Superman without killing him.
- Batman is successfully distracted from League business when the League of Assassins steals the bodies and coffins of his late parents Thomas and Martha Wayne.

=== Repercussions ===
The attack briefly but effectively incapacitates the League members long enough for Ra's al Ghul to enact his plans. After they all recover, the JLA must also deal with Ra's al Ghul's attack against the language centers of all humanity, using a specially designed tower to generate a low-level sonic signal which causes written language to be scrambled into total nonsense.

Batman's obsessive pursuit to recover his parents' remains leaves him unable to help the League in their temporary defeat until it is too late. At the moment Batman discovers who was behind the robbery and subsequent attack, Ra's al Ghul offers to drop the corpses into a Lazarus Pit which would theoretically revive them. But despite being briefly tempted by the chance, Batman rejects the offer as he would prefer to be worthy of his parents' memory rather than betray it in such a manner. Ra's al Ghul begins the second phase of his attack, scrambling not only the written word, but the spoken word as well (similar to stories related about the Tower of Babel).

When League members recover from their injuries and Batman reveals Ra's al Ghul's actions, there is much friction between him and the rest due to his role in devising the traps that nearly killed them. As the effects of the red kryptonite wear off, Superman is able to destroy the machine that is causing the chaos. Ra's al Ghul reveals that a deadly nerve agent is about to be released, sparking a war between two nations already in conflict. As Superman, Batman, and later a restored Aquaman and J'onn move on Ra's' base, Flash, Green Lantern, Plastic Man and Wonder Woman are able to prevent the release of the toxin thanks to Ra's al Ghul's daughter Talia providing them with the locations of the bombs, feeling disgusted at how her father has used her knowledge of Batman to steal his secrets.

Batman states that his plans were a cautionary measure that he devised after the Injustice League swapped bodies with the Justice League with the aid of the alien tyrant Agamemno years earlier (during the Silver Age event). Recognizing the dangers of villains gaining control of the heroes, he created fail-safes in case such a situation ever happened again, the event also inspiring him to create plans to stop the other heroes if they should go rogue on their own. Due to Batman's secretive actions and measures placed against the JLA, the rest of the League vote on whether or not he should remain a member. Wonder Woman, Plastic Man and Aquaman vote for expulsion as they feel that they cannot trust Batman, while Flash, Green Lantern and Martian Manhunter vote against as they recognize that Batman had a point in his reasoning for developing the plans in the first place. It is left for Superman to cast the deciding vote. As they enter the room where Batman is held, the team realizes that he already foresaw how Superman would decide and therefore had already left. Superman is not surprised by this, later saying that Batman would know how he would vote.

== Critical reaction ==
IGN Comics ranked "JLA: Tower of Babel" #14 on a list of the 25 greatest Batman comics, saying that "this compelling story examines the depths of Batman's paranoia, but also shows admiration for his forethought".

== In other media ==
=== Television ===
Batman's precautionary measures are featured in The Batman two-part finale "Lost Heroes". After most of the Justice League had their powers drained off by the Joining, Batman reveals to the League his secret weapons to neutralize every member, in case some of them went rogue. The League uses Batman's weapons to defeat the Joining and regain their powers.

=== Film ===
A loose adaptation of the story was made, titled Justice League: Doom. Key differences include that Plastic Man and Aquaman are replaced by Cyborg in the film, Kyle Rayner is replaced with Hal Jordan, Barry Allen is The Flash instead of Wally West, and Ra's al Ghul's role being filled by Vandal Savage and the Legion of Doom, consisting of Bane, Metallo, Cheetah, Mirror Master, Star Sapphire, and Ma'alefa'ak, instead. It was released on February 28, 2012.
