= M.A.N.T.I.S. =

- Genre: Superhero
- Created by: Sam Raimi; Sam Hamm
- Developed by: Bryce Zabel
- Directed by: David Nutter
- Starring: Carl Lumbly; Roger Rees; Christopher Gartin; Galyn Görg
- Composers: Joseph LoDuca; Randy Miller; Christopher Franke; Edgar Rothermich; Joseph Conlan
- Country of origin: United States
- Original language: English
- No. of seasons: 1
- No. of episodes: 22

Production
- Executive producers: Sam Hamm; Sam Raimi; Robert G. Tapert; Coleman Luck
- Producers: David Roesell; Paris Qualles
- Production locations: Vancouver, British Columbia, Canada
- Cinematography: Rodney Charters
- Camera setup: Single-camera
- Running time: 44 minutes
- Production companies: Wilbur Force Productions; Renaissance Pictures; Universal Television

Original release
- Network: Fox (TV movie & episodes 1-20); Sci-Fi Channel (episodes 21 & 22)
- Release: August 26, 1994 – September 14, 1997

M.A.N.T.I.S. is an American superhero television series that aired for one season on the Fox Network between August 26, 1994, and March 3, 1995, with its final two episodes airing on Sci-Fi Channel on September 7 and 14, 1997.

The original two-hour TV movie pilot was produced by Sam Raimi and developed by Sam Hamm.

== Plot ==
Wealthy, outspoken scientist Dr. Miles Hawkins (Carl Lumbly) is shot in the spine by a police sniper during a riot while trying to rescue a child, leaving him paralyzed from the waist down and using a wheelchair.

After losing a lawsuit against the police department and discovering evidence of a vast conspiracy against the black community, he angrily undergoes a change in political philosophy and uses his company Hawkins Technology's resources to invent a formfitting combination powered exoskeleton, a helmet that causes brain signals to bypass the spine, and bulletproof black body armor that not only enables him to walk while wearing it but in the process also endows him with superhuman strength, speed and agility, plus the ability to fire nonlethal paralysis darts from his wrists.

Using a vast array of technology, including a secret underwater lab called the Seapod deep beneath his secluded seaside mansion and a flying car/submarine called the Chrysalis to travel around the city at night, he secretly assumes the persona of the metal-masked vigilante known as the "M.A.N.T.I.S." ("Mechanically Augmented Neuro Transmitter Interception System", changed to "Mechanically Augmented NeuroTransmitter Interactive System" for the series) to find justice for himself and others.

The pilot featured strong roles for a variety of African-American actors, including Gina Torres as dedicated pathologist Dr. Amy Ellis, Bobby Hosea as ambitious reporter Yuri Barnes, Wendy Raquel Robinson and Christopher M. Brown as African students of Hawkins who act as his secret support staff in his fight against crime, and Steve James as handsome inner city youth club manager Antoine Pike.

The series that followed recast all the characters, save for the hero, to include British scientist/best friend/exoskeleton co-inventor John Stonebrake (Roger Rees) and smart-mouthed, streetwise young bicycle courier Taylor Savage/Savidge (Christopher Gartin), with police detective Lt. Leora Maxwell (Galyn Görg) being the only other person of color as a regular on the show, and the plot was completely rebooted and simplified from that of the pilot.

Initially, the series depicted the M.A.N.T.I.S. operating as an often-reluctant vigilante who only got involved in criminal situations when there was some sort of personal connection to him and his friends. While the costumed crimefighter was still pursued by police, the aforementioned conspiracy was now reduced down to the Machiavellian machinations of one man, evil industrialist and Miles' former business partner Solomon Box (Brion James in the first appearance, Andrew J. Robinson in later appearances). Box is often assisted by the corrupt chief of police Grant (Blu Mankuma)

However, poor ratings led to an extensive retooling of the concept. Midway through the show's run, minor recurring characters like Miles' clichéd sassy black housekeeper Lynette (Lorena Gale) were dropped, and more fantasy adventure elements were incorporated into the premise, including superpowers, parallel universes like the one where a group of eyeless men in black are from, time travel, mad scientists, ghosts, and monsters.

In one particular episode, the M.A.N.T.I.S. is accidentally thrown 32 years into the future, where he finds that his own technology has been exploited to create a supercomputer called the City Eye (voiced by Malachi Throne) which has enslaved the Port Columbia population. He destroys it and sets the human population free before returning to his own time.

In the series' finale, a trapped Miles and Leora are tragically killed battling an invisible bulletproof dinosaur (where the heat signatures of it seen through M.A.N.T.I.S.' goggles give it an Tyrannosauridae-like appearance) as they sacrifice their lives to detonate the fuel cell in the Chrysalis to kill it. John seals off the records and technology that had created the M.A.N.T.I.S., thus averting an apocalyptic future. He also ends his recording by stating that if anyone uncovers this technology, they should know the pain that Hawkins had gone through.

== Cast ==
=== Main ===
- Carl Lumbly as M.A.N.T.I.S. / Dr. Miles Hawkins
- Roger Rees as John Stonebrake
- Christopher Gartin as Taylor Savage/Savidge
- Galyn Görg as Lt. Leora Maxwell

=== Recurring ===
- Gary Graham as Capt. Ken Hetrick
- Jerry Wasserman as Det. Paul Warren
- Garry Chalk as Detective Reid
- Blu Mankuma as Chief Grant
- Clabe Hartley as Tony
- Lorena Gale as Lynette
- Robert Hooks as Mayor Lew Mitchell

== Production ==
While the pilot was filmed in Los Angeles the series itself was produced in Vancouver, British Columbia, Canada. Many Vancouver landmarks, such as the dome of Science World, appear, as do CN Rail cars on the railroad tracks.

It took three years to film due to Carl Lumbly being busy filming Nightjohn.

There were several differences between the pilot and the series.

In the pilot, Hawkins wore a stylish suit and brown leather trenchcoat over the exoskeleton without a skullcap, leaving the top of his hair bare. The mask/headpiece was larger with special glowing green lenses which could hypnotize anyone who looked into his eyes, an ability dropped from the subsequent series, as was his habit of leaving behind a small metal mantis as a calling card.

The setting was changed from Oceania City to Port Columbia, and all of the characters, with Miles Hawkins being the sole exception, were changed.

== Episodes ==
No.	Title	Directed by	Written by	Original release date	Prod. code
TBA	"M.A.N.T.I.S. (Pilot)"	Eric Laneuville	Story by : Sam Raimi & Sam Hamm; Teleplay by : Sam Hamm	January 24, 1994	69600
1	"First Steps"	David Nutter	Bryce Zabel	August 26, 1994	69601
In the series opener, Miles puts his exoskeleton to use to foil the plans of Solomon Box (Brion James).
2	"Tango Blue"	Joe Napolitano	Paris Qualles	September 2, 1994	69602
Miles sponsors a weapons turn-in program only to have the guns stolen by a band of ex-soldiers out for revenge.
3	"Days of Rage"	Les Landau	Teleplay by : Bryce Zabel & Brad Markowitz; Story by : Bryce Zabel & John M. Collins	September 9, 1994	69603
A group of teenagers addicted to an intelligence-enhancing drug kidnap the head of the company. Taylor, whose friend is part of the group, ends up hooked while looking into it.
4	"Cease Fire"	Rob Bowman	Mark Lisson	September 16, 1994	69604
Miles discovers that an ex-girlfriend on a state visit from Africa is the target for international assassins.
5	"Soldier of Misfortune"	Kim Manners	Story by : Jackie Zabel; Teleplay by : James Kramer	September 23, 1994	69606
A virtual reality-controlled android soldier is sent out on a search and destroy mission against those who canceled the military project that created him.
6	"Gloves Off"	Michael Caffey	Teleplay by : Bryce Zabel & Mark Lisson; Story by : Coleman Luck & Brad Markowitz	September 30, 1994	69608
M.A.N.T.I.S. comes to the aid of a man (Eric Allan Kramer) who is forced to participate in an underground fighting sport.
7	"The Black Dragon"	Mario Azzopardi	Teleplay by : David Ransil; Story by : Nick Corea & David Ransil	October 7, 1994	69607
When the Yakuza tries to take over Port Columbia, Miles discovers that the only way to defeat them is to fulfill an ancient Japanese prophecy and take on the role of a legendary warrior to face its member Kimodo (Stephen Chang).
8	"To Prey in Darkness"	Cliff Bole	Teleplay by : Marc Scott Zicree; Story by : Brad Markowitz & Marc Scott Zicree	October 14, 1994	69605
A government agent sent to investigate the M.A.N.T.I.S. situation is not what he seems and Solomon Box (Andrew J. Robinson) is involved.
9	"Fire in the Heart"	Rob Bowman	Paris Qualles	October 21, 1994	69609
A property developer named Justin Battle (Erik King) uses a teenager with pyrokinesis named Tiger (Patrick Y. Malone) to commit acts of arson.
10	"Thou Shalt Not Kill: Part 1"	Michael Caffey	Bryce Zabel & Brad Markowitz	November 4, 1994	69610
When M.A.N.T.I.S. is framed for a murder he didn't commit and Miles discovers the identity of the cop who shot him, a deadly trap is set. (Part 1 of 2)
11	"Revelation: Part 2"	David Grossman	Bryce Zabel & Brad Markowitz	November 11, 1994	69611
With Miles unconscious and the M.A.N.T.I.S. suit developing a mind of its own, his friends must find and save him before an all-out police manhunt captures or kills him. (Part 2 of 2)
12	"Through the Dark Circle"	Kim Manners	Coleman Luck & Carel Gage Luck	November 18, 1994	69612
When Taylor discovers a mysterious portal in an abandoned military facility, Port Columbia is invaded by sinister mind-controlling men in black (Andrew Kavadas, Phil Hayes, and Harrison Coe) from another dimension.
13	"The Eyes Beyond"	Richard Compton	Coleman Luck & Carel Gage Luck	December 9, 1994	69616
M.A.N.T.I.S. is accidentally hurled into a future where Port Columbia is ruled by an evil supercomputer (voiced by Malachi Throne) based on technology Miles created.
14	"Faces in the Mask"	Neill Fearnley	Teleplay by : Coleman Luck; Story by : Scott Curtis & Coleman Luck	December 16, 1994	69614
A masked madman (Peter Frechette) seeks revenge on his former business partners using holographic disguises.
15	"The Sea Wasp"	John Nicolella	Paris Qualles	January 6, 1995	69618
Miles becomes the target of a scientist named Dr. Marissa Savoy (Cec Verrell) who has genetically altered herself and her students using jellyfish DNA to create a deadly new race of aquatic humans.
16	"Progenitor"	Mario Azzopardi	Bryce Zabel	January 20, 1995	69619
The clone of an old associate of Miles named Michael Angelides (Vincent Schiavelli) kidnaps Miles and replaces him with a clone in order to start up a long-dead project.
17	"Switches"	Neill Fearnley	Coleman Luck & Carel Gage Luck	January 27, 1995	69621
Thanks to a last minute experiment, a mad scientist named Gerald Ravens (Stephen McHattie) uploads his mind into Port Columbia's electrical system and exacts revenge on those responsible for his execution by electric chair.
18	"The Delusionist"	Tucker Gates	Coleman Luck III	February 10, 1995	69617
A deranged magician named Randy Ferril (Luca Bercovici) uses a hypnotic device to brainwash the teenagers of Port Columbia. Among them are Taylor and Leora's younger sister.
19	"Fast Forward"	Cliff Bole	David Kemper	February 17, 1995	69620
M.A.N.T.I.S. faces off against the bio-tech chemist B.B. Rantzer (Curtis Armstrong) whose super-speed came from a formula compound that he worked on with his late wife Rona Silkiss (Michele Goodger) which was supposed to break down plastic. His abilities have also enabled him to move fast enough to become invisible as he plans revenge on Port Columbia for its wasteful consumerism and rejecting Rona's help. How can M.A.N.T.I.S. stop a villain who moves faster than the human eye?
20	"Spider in the Tower"	Kim Manners	Coleman Luck & Coleman Luck III	March 3, 1995	69623
The Men in Black (Andrew Kavadas, Phil Hayes, Harrison Coe, and Hrothgar Mathews) are back and send C. Flayton "Spider" Ruell (Mark Sheppard) on a mission to destroy M.A.N.T.I.S., starting with the murder of John Stonebrake. Ruell is revealed to have been created by the Men in Black who combined the DNA samples of humanity and the Men in Black's race. M.A.N.T.I.S. must overcome his anger of Stonebrake's comatose state in order to defeat Ruell.
21	"Ancestral Evil"	Cliff Bole	Paris Qualles & Brad Markowitz	September 7, 1997	69624
An attempt to create a holographic family tree computer program during a lightning storm accidentally unleashes an evil Druid ancestor of John's in the modern world.
22	"Ghost of the Ice"	Kim Manners	David Kemper	September 14, 1997	69625
When the Chrysalis crashes in the wilderness, Miles and John must escape from an invisible dinosaur that has awoken from a nearby thawing glacier. While dodging the invisible dinosaur, they run into a local mountain man (M.C. Gainey) who has been hunting the invisible dinosaur. This difficult battle ends up causing Miles and Leora to make the ultimate sacrifice to slay the invisible dinosaur.

== Home media ==
The series was released on Amazon's Digital Download service Unbox on April 2, 2008. A DVD set of the series, including the original pilot, was released on January 27, 2009.
