= Nightjohn =

1993 historical fiction novel by Gary Paulsen

- First edition
- Author: Gary Paulsen
- Language: English
- Series: Nightjohn series
- Genre: Historical novel
- Publisher: Delacorte Press
- Publication date: 1993
- Publication place: United States
- Media type: Print (Paperback & Hardback)
- Pages: 92
- Followed by: Sarny

Nightjohn is a 1993 historical fiction novel by American author Gary Paulsen. It is about Southern American slavery shortly before the time of the American Civil War. In 1996, it was later made into a movie of the same name.

This book was followed by a sequel called Sarny, a Life Remembered in 1997.

== Plot summary ==
The novel is set on a plantation owned by a man named Waller in the Southern United States in the early 1850s. The narrator and protagonist of the story is a young female African-American slave named Sarny. Sarny first sees Nightjohn when he is brought to the plantation with a rope around his neck, his body covered in scars. He had escaped to the North for freedom, but knowing that the penalty for reading is dismemberment, John still returned to slavery to teach others how to read. Twelve-year-old Sarny is willing to learn. So, at night and whenever he has the chance, John begins teaching Sarny the letters of the English alphabet. However even while John teaches Sarny 8 letters (A to H), Walter, their cruel owner, catches her writing in the dirt and punishes John for teaching her by cutting off the toes from each of his feet. But then after three days of recuperating, John runs and makes it to freedom.

He later returns to fetch Sarny and take her to "pit school" in the night, where she sees and learns what a catalog is, learns the rest of the letters, and has acquired great knowledge- something no one can take away from her. Since John comes at night, he is called Nightjohn.

== Reception ==
Upon the novel's release, Publishers Weekly referred to Nightjohn as "among the most powerful of Paulsen's works" and highlighted how "impeccably researched" the novel was.

Kirkus Reviews found that "some of the violence here is redundant: it's not necessary to describe three different but equally terrible deaths suffered by runaways set upon by dogs to make the point"; they concluded, however, that "the anguish is all too real in this brief, unbearably vivid book".

== Film adaptation ==
The novel was adapted as a TV film which aired on the Disney Channel starring Carl Lumbly as John, Beau Bridges as the slaveholder, and introducing Allison Jones as Sarny. It was directed by Charles Burnett.
