= Justice League: Doom =

2012 film directed by Lauren Montgomery

- Home video release cover art
- Directed by: Lauren Montgomery
- Written by: Dwayne McDuffie
- Based on: "JLA: Tower of Babel" by: Mark Waid; Howard Porter; Steve Scott
- Produced by: Lauren Montgomery
- Starring: Kevin Conroy; Tim Daly; Susan Eisenberg; Nathan Fillion; Carl Lumbly; Michael Rosenbaum
- Edited by: Christopher D. Lozinski
- Music by: Christopher Drake
- Production companies: Warner Bros. Animation; Warner Premiere; DC Entertainment
- Distributed by: Warner Home Video
- Release date: February 28, 2012
- Running time: 77 minutes
- Country: United States
- Language: English

Justice League: Doom is a 2012 American anime-influenced animated superhero film directed by Lauren Montgomery and written by Dwayne McDuffie. A standalone sequel to Justice League: Crisis on Two Earths (2010), it was loosely based on "JLA: Tower of Babel", a 2000 comic book storyline that ran in the DC Comics series JLA. It is the 13th film of the DC Universe Animated Original Movies.

Justice League: Doom was released on February 28, 2012. The film also features various actors reprising their roles from the DC Animated Universe.

== Plot ==
Vandal Savage plans to start a new civilization by exterminating two thirds of the population and hires Mirror Master to hack into the Batcomputer and steal contingency plans devised by Batman to incapacitate his League teammates should they go rogue. Savage assembles Cheetah, Star Sapphire, Metallo, Bane, Mirror Master, and Ma'alefa'ak and offers them money to simultaneously attack the League members using the plans, which he has altered to be lethal. Together, the villains form the Legion of Doom.

As each of them do their part to take out the Justice League, Alfred Pennyworth informs Batman that the bodies of Thomas and Martha Wayne have been exhumed and are missing. At their graves, Bane ambushes Batman, then beats him unconscious and buries him alive in his father's coffin.

Martian Manhunter celebrates his birthday with his colleagues in his civilian identity as John Jones. A disguised Ma'afela'ak gives him a drink laced with poison containing magnesium carbonate, then sets him on fire with enough magnesium to fuel the flame for weeks.

Cheetah ambushes Wonder Woman at a dock and infects her with nanomachines that make her perceive everyone as Cheetah. This will cause her to fight until she dies from a stress-induced heart attack or brain aneurysm. The Amazon proceeds to attack both Cheetah and nearby innocent bystanders.

Mirror Master lures Flash into a trap, attaching a bomb to his wrist. If he tries to remove it or decreases in speed, the bomb will explode, killing everyone in a three-mile radius.

Star Sapphire targets Green Lantern, luring him to a mine and using Scarecrow's fear gas on him. After he fails to save her hostages' lives, she convinces him that he does not deserve his mantle, causing him to renounce his ring and resign himself to his fate in the collapsing mine.

On the Daily Planet's roof, former employee Henry Ackerman is aiming to commit suicide. Superman arrives on the scene and talks Ackerman down. However, Ackerman, revealed to be a disguised Metallo, shoots him with a Kryptonite bullet.

Back at the Hall of Doom, the Legion celebrates their victory. Savage reveals he plans to fire a rocket into the sun, triggering a solar flare that will destroy half the planet and disable all modern technology. Meanwhile, Batman comes close to accepting his fate. However, a tape recorder left behind by Bane plays a taunting message which motivates him to break out and save the League. At the same time, Cyborg hears of Wonder Woman's predicament and sets out on his own.

Cyborg arrives on the scene of Wonder Woman's rampage, neutralizing the nanites with a sonic frequency. Then, he, Wonder Woman and Batman save Martian Manhunter using aluminum oxide to neutralize the magnesium. Meanwhile, Batman tells Flash to run and vibrate through an iceberg in the Arctic, leaving the bomb inside it and saving him. Arriving at the collapsed mine, Batman shows Jordan that the hostages and terrorists were merely androids. Sure of himself once more, Jordan re-establishes his will and regains control of his ring.

Wonder Woman, Cyborg and Martian Manhunter arrive in Metropolis, where Superman's health has deteriorated. They extract the bullet with an improvised scalpel, allowing him to recover.

The League retreats to the Watchtower, where Batman reveals he created the plans and has a hidden tracing algorithm in place should the Batcomputer be hacked. The League tracks down and subdues the Legion of Doom but fails to stop the rocket from launching. Using the Hall of Doom's technology, the League phases the whole planet, so the flare harmlessly passes through, saving Earth in the process.

At the Watchtower, Superman reports that Vandal Savage has been found guilty of crimes against humanity and sentenced to life without parole by the World Court. The Justice League officially adds Cyborg to their roster and votes on whether Batman should be allowed to remain a member. Batman defends his actions and criticizes the others for not understanding the potential danger of a rogue Justice League before quitting. As he leaves, Superman asks whether Batman ever made a plan for the event that he himself went rogue. Batman responds that the Justice League itself is his plan for that. With his trust in Batman assured, Superman teleports him out of the Watchtower after giving him a box with the Kryptonite bullet inside.

== Voice cast ==
- Kevin Conroy as Bruce Wayne / Batman^{a}: a playboy billionaire who secretly operates as a highly trained masked vigilante armed with hi-tech weaponry and gadgets after the murder of his parents. He secretly has contingency plans to subdue the members of the Justice League if they use their power for evil.
- Tim Daly as Kal-El / Clark Kent / Superman^{a}: an extraterrestrial from the planet Krypton who is completely invulnerable, can fly, has super strength and can shoot energy beams from his eyes. In public, he works as a reporter for the Daily Planet.
- Susan Eisenberg as Princess Diana / Wonder Woman^{a}: a demigoddess princess and Amazon warrior from Themyscira.
- Nathan Fillion as Hal Jordan / Green Lantern: a test pilot who uses a ring fueled by willpower to fly, survive in space, and create hard light constructs.
- Carl Lumbly as J'onn J'onzz / Martian Manhunter^{a}: a shape-shifting telepath from Mars.
  - Ma'alefa'ak J'onnz / Ma'alefa'ak (uncredited): another Martian who serves as J'onzz's nemesis.
- Michael Rosenbaum as Barry Allen / The Flash^{a}: a CSI who was given super speed after getting struck by lightning and doused with chemicals.
- Bumper Robinson as Victor Stone / Cyborg: a former athlete who was enhanced with cybernetic enhancements following a near-fatal accident.
- Carlos Alazraqui as Bane: one of Batman's adversaries, who enhances his strength with venom tubes attached to his back.
- Dee Bradley Baker as Officer in Charge
- Claudia Black as Barbara Ann Minerva / Cheetah: Wonder Woman's nemesis, who was cursed to take the form of a cheetah and blames Wonder Woman for her situation.
- Paul Blackthorne as John Corben / Metallo: an android, and one of Superman's adversaries, who has a heart of pure Kryptonite.
  - Henry Ackerson (uncredited): a former reporter for the Daily Planet, who Metallo uses as a disguise.
- Olivia d'Abo as Carol Ferris / Star Sapphire^{a}: one of Green Lantern's adversaries, with similar abilities.
- Grey DeLisle as Lois Lane: a reporter for the Daily Planet
  - Queen (uncredited): a member of the Royal Flush Gang
- Alexis Denisof as Sam Scudder / Mirror Master^{a}: one of Flash's adversaries, who uses holograms, a mirror gun and can hide through reflective surfaces.
- Robin Atkin Downes as Alfred Pennyworth: Bruce's butler
  - Jack (uncredited): a member of the Royal Flush Gang
- Brian George as Mayor of Metropolis
- Danny Jacobs as Special Agent Porter
- David Kaufman as Jimmy Olsen^{a}: a photographer for the Daily Planet
- Juliet Landau as Ten: a member of the Royal Flush Gang
- Jim Meskimen as King: a member of the Royal Flush Gang
- Phil Morris as Vandar Adg / Vandal Savage^{a}: an immortal tyrant who seeks to take over the Earth.
- Andrea Romano as Batcomputer voice
- Bruce Timm as Ace: an android who works for the Royal Flush Gang

^a The actor/actress's voice role is reprised from the DC Animated Universe (DCAU).

- The actress who supplied the voice for Ma'alefa'ak's female disguise is uncredited and unknown.

== Production ==
The film was first announced at WonderCon 2011 that the JLA: Tower of Babel storyline will be adapted as a direct-to-video film, which was written by Dwayne McDuffie right before his death. The character designs were done by Phil Bourassa, the lead character designer of Justice League: Crisis on Two Earths and Young Justice. Storyboards were overseen and animated by Telecom Animation Film. During the casting process of Justice League: Doom, voice director Andrea Romano expressed an interest for the cast from various media to reprise their roles as members of the Justice League.

== Reception ==
IGN gave the film a 7 out of 10, calling it "An immensely enjoyable thrill ride, but also an occasionally frustrating and short adaptation."

It earned $7,550,303 from domestic home video sales.

== Home media ==
The Blu-ray combo pack includes Featurettes only for Blu-ray called "Guarding the Balance: Batman and the JLA", a mini-Featurette called "Their Time Has Come: Cyborg and the DC Universe's New Diversity", while both Blu-ray and the 2-Disc DVD edition has "A Legion of One: The Dwayne McDuffie Story", a Sneak Peek at Superman vs. The Elite, and two bonus episodes of Justice League: "Wild Cards" part 1 and 2.

== Cancelled sequel ==
Originally, Justice League vs. the Fatal Five was intended to be a stand-alone sequel to Justice League: Doom, bringing back its voice actors and using Phil Bourassa's art style and models for the film's animation. However, when James Tucker approached Bruce Timm about concerns of the audience confusing the film as being set in the New 52-based DC Animated Movie Universe (DCAMU) movies, Timm resolved to use the same animation models from Justice League and Justice League Unlimited, ambiguously setting the film instead within the DC Animated Universe (DCAU).

== See also ==
- Tartarus (DC Comics)
