= Carl Lumbly =

American actor (born 1951)

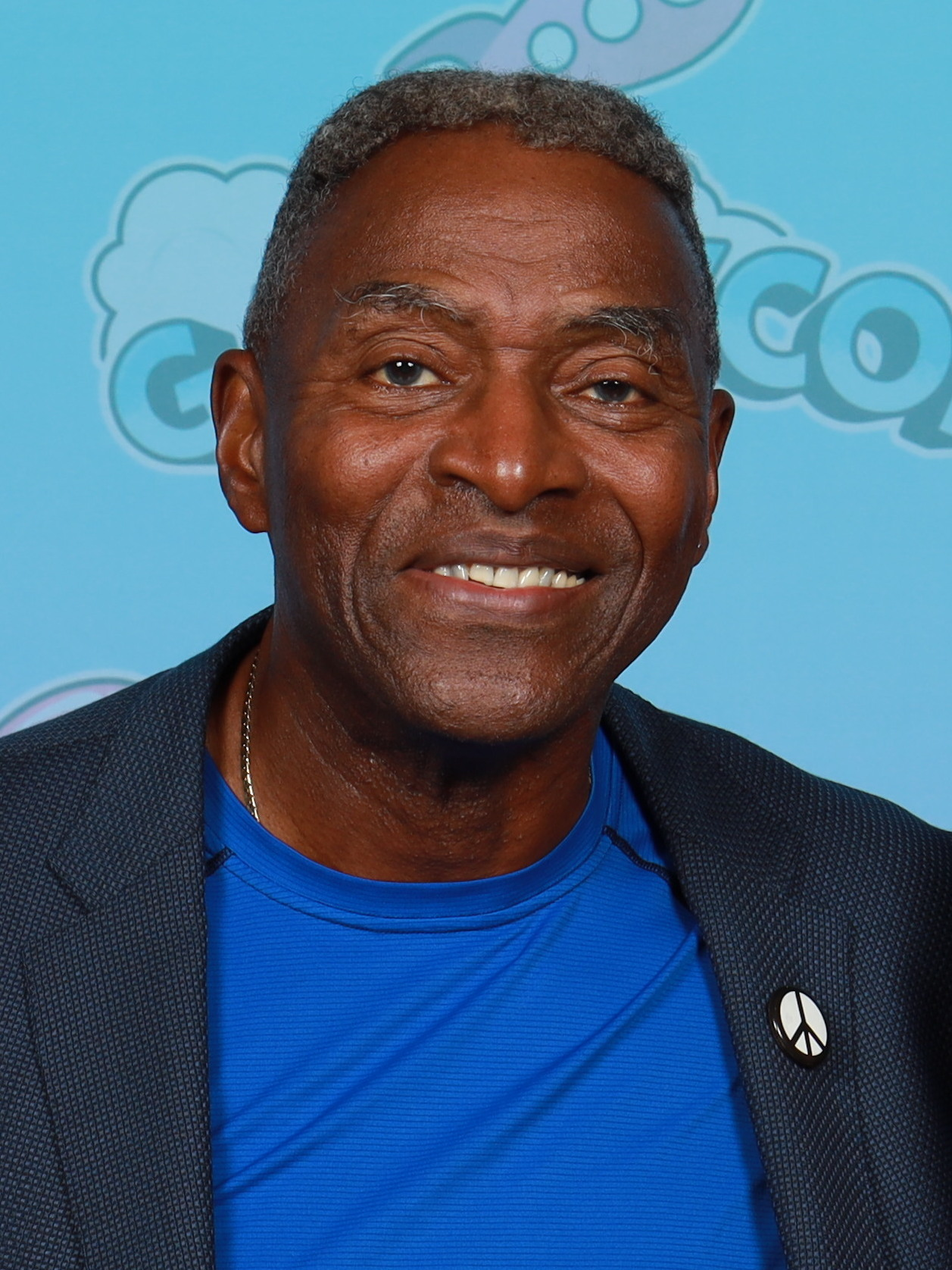
- Lumbly at GalaxyCon Richmond in 2025
- Born: Carl Winston Lumbly; August 14, 1951 (age 75); Minneapolis, Minnesota, U.S.
- Education: Macalester College
- Occupation: Actor
- Years active: 1979–present
- Spouses: Vonetta McGee (m. 1987; died 2010) Deborah Santana (m. 2015; div. 2019)
- Children: 1

Carl Winston Lumbly (born August 14, 1951) is an American actor. He is known for M.A.N.T.I.S. (1994–1997) and has also had television roles on Cagney & Lacey (1982–1988) and Alias (2001–2006).

He has also had roles in various superhero franchises including voicing Martian Manhunter in the DC Animated Universe (DCAU). Lumbly later portrayed M'yrnn J'onzz, Martian Manhunter's father, in Supergirl (2017–2019). He has since portrayed Isaiah Bradley, a super soldier in the Marvel Cinematic Universe (MCU), appearing in The Falcon and the Winter Soldier (2021) and Captain America: Brave New World (2025).

== Early life ==
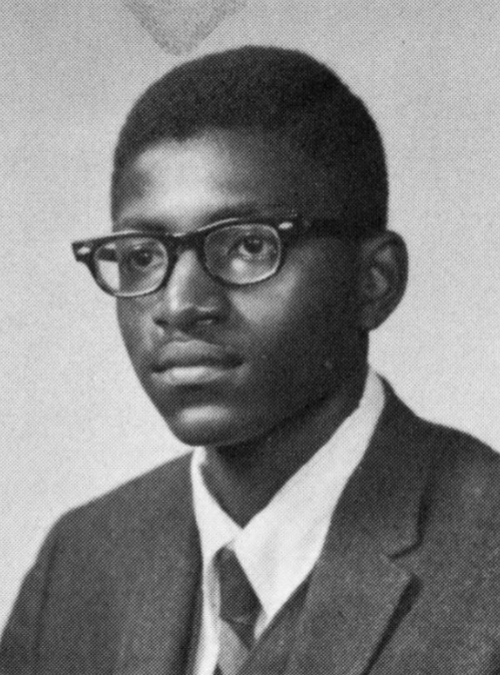
Lumbly in his senior year of high school, 1969

Lumbly was born to Jamaican immigrants in Minneapolis, Minnesota. He graduated from South High School there and Macalester College in nearby St. Paul.

Lumbly's first career was as a journalist in Minnesota. While on assignment for a story about a workshop theatre, he was cast as an actor. He stayed with the improvisational company for two years and later moved to San Francisco where he discovered a newspaper ad seeking "two black actors for South African political plays." He went to the audition and landed one of the parts (along with then-unknown Danny Glover). Lumbly and Glover toured in productions of Athol Fugard's Sizwe Banzi Is Dead and The Island.

== Career ==
Lumbly's first major role was Detective Marcus Petrie on the television series Cagney & Lacey (1982–1988), where his character was paired with Detective Victor Isbecki (Martin Kove). In 1985, he appeared as Theseus in The Gospel At Colonus, an African-American musical iteration of the Oedipus legend on PBS's Great Performances series.

In 1987, he garnered positive reviews for his portrayal of Black Panther Party co-founder Bobby Seale in the HBO television film Conspiracy: The Trial of the Chicago 8. From 1989 to 1990, he portrayed ongoing character Earl Williams (named for the prisoner in Ben Hecht and Charles MacArthur's story The Front Page), a teacher falsely accused of the rape/murder of a female student, in the series L.A. Law.

In 1990, he co-starred in Charles Burnett's critically acclaimed film To Sleep with Anger. From 1994 to 1995, Lumbly starred as the main character in the short-lived science fiction series M.A.N.T.I.S.. One of his most visible roles was as Marcus Dixon in the American television series Alias (2001–2006).

Other prominent roles include providing the voice for Martian Manhunter in the DC Animated Universe (DCAU) series Justice League and Justice League Unlimited, as well as the character's father, M'yrnn J'onzz, in the series Supergirl. Lumbly also voiced minor or recurring characters in the DCAU - Alterus and the mayor of Metropolis in Superman: The Animated Series, Stalker in Batman Beyond, and Anansi in Static Shock.

In 2000, Lumbly portrayed activist and Congressman Ron Dellums in the Disney Channel original film The Color of Friendship. Although the film was focused on Dellums's daughter's friendship with a white South African girl, the film also discussed Dellums's role in ending apartheid in South Africa.

Also in 2000, Lumbly guest starred in the season one The West Wing episode "Six Meetings Before Lunch" as Jeff Breckenridge, a nominee for U.S. Assistant Attorney General who supports reparations for slavery. Lumbly appeared as Daniel "Bulldog" Novacek in the 2004 television series Battlestar Galactica. He also plays a role in the Kane's Wrath expansion pack for the video game Command and Conquer 3. More recently, he played police captain Joe Rucker on TNT's Southland.

In 2021, Lumbly guest starred in several episodes of the Disney+ series The Falcon and the Winter Soldier (2021) as Isaiah Bradley, set in the Marvel Cinematic Universe (MCU), and reprised his role in the feature film Captain America: Brave New World (2025).

He was also cast as the father of Beth Pearson, Abraham Clarke, in the series, This Is Us.

In 2023, Lumbly portrayed C. Auguste Dupin, a major character in Netflix's The Fall of the House of Usher.

== Personal life ==
Lumbly has been married twice and has one son. He was married to actress Vonetta McGee from 1987 until her death in 2010. Together they had one son, born in 1988. Lumbly married author Deborah Santana in 2015 and the couple divorced in 2019.

== Filmography ==
=== Film ===
Year	Title	Role	Notes
1979	Escape from Alcatraz	Pete (Inmate)	
1981	Caveman	Bork	
1981	Lifepod	Keshah	
1984	The Adventures of Buckaroo Banzai Across the 8th Dimension	John Parker	
1987	The Bedroom Window	Detective Quirke	
1988	Judgement in Berlin	Edwin Palmer	
1988	Everybody's All-American	Narvel Blue	
1990	To Sleep with Anger	Junior	
1990	Pacific Heights	Lou Baker	
1992	South Central	Ali	
1998	Batman & Mr. Freeze: SubZero	Additional voices	Direct-to-video
1998	How Stella Got Her Groove Back	Judge Spencer Boyle	
1999	Nightjohn	Nightjohn	
2000	Men of Honor	Mac Brashear	
2000	9mm of Love	Cue	Short film
2002	Just a Dream	J.M. Hoagland	
2003	Nat Turner: A Troublesome Property	Nat Turner – Gray	Documentary
2007	Namibia: The Struggle for Liberation	Sam Nujoma	
2008	The Alphabet Killer	Ellis Parks	
2008	Immigrants	Splits Jackson (voice)	English dub
2010	Nominated	Ray Cowan	
2012	Justice League: Doom	J'onn J'onzz / Martian Manhunter, Ma'alefa'ak (voice)	Direct-to-video
2012	99%	Carl Westen	Short film
2015	Justice League: Gods and Monsters	Silas Stone (voice)	Direct-to-video
2015	Quitters	Dr. Weiss	
2016	Gilpin's Nightmare	Charles Gilpin	Short film
2016	Love Twice	Rodrigo	
2016	A Cure for Wellness	Wilson	
2019	Doctor Sleep	Dick Hallorann	
2022	I'm Charlie Walker	Willie	
2024	The Life of Chuck	Sam Yarbrough	
2025	Captain America: Brave New World	Isaiah Bradley	
2027	The Exorcist: Martyrs	TBA	Post-production

=== Television ===
Year	Title	Role	Notes
1979	Emergency!	Beutel	Episode: "What's a Nice Girl Like You Doing...?"
1979	Undercover with the KKK	Reverend Lowell	Television film
1980	Lou Grant	Beutel	Episode: "Hazard"
1980	Taxi	Customer #2	Episode: "Fantasy Borough"
1981	The Jeffersons	Jimmy	Episode: "And the Doorknobs Shined Like Diamonds"
1981	B. J. and the Bear	Telephone Representative	Episode: "Intercepted Pass"
1981–1988	Cagney & Lacey	Marcus Petrie	Main role
1985	Great Performances	Theseus	Episode: "The Gospel at Colonus"
1987	Conspiracy: The Trial of the Chicago 8	Bobby Seale	Television film
1989–1990	L.A. Law	Earl Williams	6 episodes
1991	Eyes of a Witness	Mambulu	Television film
1991	Brother Future	Denmark Vesey	Television film
1991	American Experience	Narrator	Episode: "Marcus Garvey: Look for Me in the Whirlwind"
1992	Back to the Streets of San Francisco	Charlie Walker	Television film
1992–1993	Going to Extremes	Dr. Norris	Main role
1993	Tribeca	Ernest	Episode: "The Box"
1994–1995	M.A.N.T.I.S.	Miles Hawkins	Main role
1994	Out of Darkness	Addison	Television film
1994	SeaQuest 2032	Lamm	Episode: "The Last Lap of Luxury"
1994	On Promised Land	Floyd Ween	Television film
1994	Cagney & Lacey: The Return	Marcus Petrie	Television film
1996	America's Dream	Cal	Television film; segment: "The Boy Who Painted Christ Black"
1996	Chicago Hope	Michael Johnson	Episode: "Life Lines"
1996	Nightjohn	John	Television film
1996	Touched by an Angel	Willis Thompson	Episode: "Sins of the Father"
1996	The X-Files	Marcus Duff	Episode: "Teliko"
1996–1997	EZ Streets	Christian Davidson	9 episodes
1997	The Real Adventures of Jonny Quest	William Marcus (voice)	Episode: "Other Space"
1997	The Ditchdigger's Daughters	Donald Thornton	Television film
1997	Buffalo Soldiers	John Horse	Television film
1997–1998	Superman: The Animated Series	Alterus, Mayor of Metropolis (voice)	2 episodes
1998	The Wedding	Lute McNeil	Television film
1999	Any Day Now	Nathan	2 episodes
1999	Border Line	Detective Mollo	Television film
1999	ER	Graham Baker	2 episodes
1999	Strange World	Kevin Manus	Episode: "Eliza"
1999–2000	Batman Beyond	Stalker (voice)	2 episodes
1999–2000	The Wild Thornberrys	Red Colobus, Tumbulu (voice)	2 episodes
2000	The Color of Friendship	Ron Dellums	Television film
2000	Little Richard	Bud Penniman	Television film
2000	The West Wing	Jeff Breckenridge	Episode: "Six Meetings Before Lunch"
2000	The Magnificent Seven	Obediah Jackson	Episode: "The Trial"
2000	Family Law	Tom Calloway	Episode: "Affairs of the State"
2001	American Experience	Frederick Douglass	Episode: "The Massachusetts 54th Colored Infantry""
2001	Kate Brasher	Jackson Turner	Episode: "Jackson Turner"
2001	Night Visions	Dan	Episode: "A View Through the Window"
2001–2004	Justice League	J'onn J'onzz / Martian Manhunter (voice)	Main cast
2001–2006	Alias	Marcus Dixon	Main role
2002	Toonami	Swayzak	Episode: "Trapped in Hyperspace"
2003	The Wonderful World of Disney	The Father	Episode: "Sounder"
2003	Static Shock	J'onn J'onzz / Martian Manhunter, Anansi (voice)	3 episodes
2004–2006	Justice League Unlimited	J'onn J'onzz / Martian Manhunter (voice)	18 episodes
2005	Slavery and the Making of America	Salomon Northup	Episode: "Seeds of Destruction"
2006	Battlestar Galactica	Danny 'Bulldog' Novacek	Episode: "Hero"
2008	Cold Case	Cordell Baker '08	Episode: "Wednesday's Women"
2008	Grey's Anatomy	Kurt Walling	Episode: "There's No 'I' in Team"
2008	Chuck	Ty Bennett	Episode: "Chuck Versus the Sensei"
2009	Batman: The Brave and the Bold	Tornado Champion, Tornado Tyrant (voice)	Episode: "Hail the Tornado Tyrant!"
2010	Black Panther	S'Yan (voice)	6 episodes
2010	Trauma	Special Agent Reynolds	Episode: "Tunnel Vision"
2010	Criminal Minds	James "Jay-Mo" Morris	Episode: "Devil's Night"
2011	NCIS	Beau Hindley	Episode: "Tell-All"
2012	Southland	Joel Rucker	3 episodes
2014	Family Guy	Loan Officer (voice)	Episode: "Baking Bad"
2014	Hope: The Last Paladin	Robert Danforth	Episode: "Pilot"
2015	The Returned	Leon Wright	5 episodes
2015	Zoo	Delavenne	6 episodes
2016	UnREAL	Henry Carter	Episode: "Infiltration"
2017	Six	Robert Chase Sr.	Episode: "Confession"
2017	Doubt	Walter Don Burkes	Episode: "#2.5"
2017–2018	NCIS: Los Angeles	Charles Langston	4 episodes
2017–2019	Supergirl	M'yrnn J'onzz	Recurring role; 15 episodes
2018	Bunnicula	Lead Prison Guard, Vampire Bat (voice)	Episode: "Prism Prison"
2019, 2022	This Is Us	Abe Clarke	2 episodes
2020	God Friended Me	Alphonse Jeffries	Episode: "BFF"
2020	Altered Carbon	Lukas Imani	2 episodes
2021	The Falcon and the Winter Soldier	Isaiah Bradley	3 episodes
2021	Young Justice	M'aatt M'orzz (voice)	3 episodes
2021–2022	S.W.A.T.	Saint	3 episodes
2023	The Fall of the House of Usher	C. Auguste Dupin	8 episodes
2023	Obliterated	James Langdon	6 episodes

=== Theater ===
Year	Title
1980	Eden
1997	Macbeth
2013	The Motherfucker with the Hat
2013	Storefront Church
2015	Let There Be Love
2015	Between Riverside and Crazy
2016	Red Velvet

=== Video games ===
Year	Title	Role	Notes
2004	Alias	Agent Marcus Dixon	
2008	Command and Conquer 3: Kane's Wrath	Brother Marcion	
2010	BioShock 2: Minerva's Den	Charles Milton Porter	
2012	Diablo III	Witch Doctor	Also Reaper of Souls DLC
2013	Injustice: Gods Among Us	J'onn J'onzz / Martian Manhunter	Uncredited
2015	Heroes of the Storm	Nazeebo	
2017	Tacoma	ODIN	
TBA	Deadlock	Solomon	

== Awards and nominations ==
- 1980: Los Angeles Drama Critics Circle Award, Lead Performance – Eden
