= Sarny (novel) =

1997 novel by Gary Paulsen

- Author: Gary Paulsen
- Language: English
- Series: Nightjohn series
- Genre: Novel
- Publisher: Dell Books
- Publication date: September 8, 1997
- Publication place: United States
- Media type: Print (Hardback)
- Pages: 192 pp
- ISBN: 0-385-32195-3
- OCLC: 36201416
- LC Class: PZ7.P2843 Sar 1997
- Preceded by: Nightjohn

Sarny: A Life Remembered is the sequel to Nightjohn by Gary Paulsen. It was published on September 8, 1997 by Dell Books.

Critics provided mixed reviews, with Booklist offering a starred review. Publishers Weekly called the protagonist "a noble character who carries Paulsen's message of the power of literacy" and referred to the story as "a page-turner". Kirkus Reviews added that "Sarny's indomitability will win over skeptics, and the way her ability to read frees more than her body will not be lost on thoughtful readers."

However, Kirkus Reviews also noted that the novel's "ending seems abrupt". Multiple reviewers criticized some points of ease within the story. Kirkus Reviews noted that "the plot takes too many convenient turns", while Publishers Weekly argued that "young adults more familiar with the complexities of America after the Civil War may find that this sugar-coated tale goes down a bit too easily".

The Young Adult Library Services Association included Sarny on their 1998 list of Quick Picks for Reluctant Young Adult Readers.
