= Teliko =

- The X-Files episode
- The pigment loss of one of the black victims. To achieve this look, several layers of cover-up cream and white powder needed to be applied.
- Episode no.: Season 4 Episode 3
- Directed by: James Charleston
- Written by: Howard Gordon
- Production code: 4X04
- Original air date: October 18, 1996
- Running time: 43 minutes

Guest appearances
- Mitch Pileggi as Walter Skinner; Laurie Holden as Marita Covarrubias; Willie Amakye as Samuel Aboah; Carl Lumbly as Marcus Duff; Don Stewart as Businessman; Maxine Guess as Flight Attendant; Bob Morrisey as Dr. Simon Bruin; Brendan Beiser as Agent Pendrell; Dexter Bell as Alfred Kittel; Zakes Mokae as Diabria; Sean Campbell as Lt. Madsen

Episode chronology
← Previous "Home"	Next → "Unruhe"
- The X-Files season 4

"Teliko" is the third episode of the fourth season of the American science fiction television series The X-Files. It was written by Howard Gordon and directed by James Charleston. The episode originally aired in the United States on October 18, 1996, on the Fox network. It is a "Monster-of-the-Week" story, a stand-alone plot which is unconnected to the series' wider mythology. "Teliko" earned a Nielsen rating of 11.3, being watched by 18.01 million people upon its initial broadcast.

The show centers on FBI special agents Fox Mulder (David Duchovny) and Dana Scully (Gillian Anderson) who work on cases linked to the paranormal, called X-Files. In this episode, Mulder and Scully are called in to investigate the unexplained deaths of several African and African-American people whose skin color has turned white as the result of either a rare medical disorder or a bizarre curse.

The episode features the second appearance by Laurie Holden as Marita Covarrubias, following her debut in the fourth-season premiere "Herrenvolk". Carl Lumbly guest stars as a social worker. Inspired by the topics of racial discrimination, "Teliko" explores xenophobia and prejudice. The make-up effects in the episode were difficult to apply and took several hours to be completed. The episode received mixed reviews from critics, who compared the episode to older episodes of the series. The racial topics of the episode drew mixed attention.

== Plot ==
On an international airline flight, an African man enters the bathroom, where he is attacked by a man exhibiting albino traits. The attacker leaves the bathroom with his normal black skin tone. Before the plane lands in the United States, a flight attendant discovers the victim in the bathroom, devoid of his skin pigmentation.

Three months later, Walter Skinner (Mitch Pileggi) calls in Dana Scully (Gillian Anderson) and informs her that four African American men have been kidnapped in Philadelphia. One of them has been found dead exhibiting depigmentation. A specialist from the CDC believes that the men have died from a disease, and has requested Scully to investigate the case. Fox Mulder (David Duchovny) joins Scully and has some of the evidence samples from Sanders' autopsy analyzed by Agent Pendrell, who finds a seed from a rare West African passionflower. Mulder takes the seed to his UN informant Marita Covarrubias and asks for her help; she provides him with information on the incident on the plane.

Meanwhile, Samuel Aboah (Willie Amakye), an African immigrant who is seeking citizenship, attacks a young black man while he is waiting for a bus, kidnapping him. Investigating the disappearance, Mulder predicts that another seed will be found. They have Marcus Duff (Carl Lumbly), a social worker who is helping Aboah apply for citizenship, cross-reference the names from the flight with those applying for permanent residency or a work visa. This leads them to Aboah, who runs when they try to question him and is discovered after squeezing himself into a drainage pipe. Aboah appears to have no symptoms of disease when he is analyzed at a local medical center, but Scully plans to examine him more.

Mulder sees Diabra, a diplomat from Burkina Faso. Diabra tells him an old folk tale of the Bambara people about the Teliko, which were nocturnal "spirits of the air". Meanwhile, Scully examines a PET scan of Aboah, which shows that he has no pituitary gland. Aboah escapes the hospital and meets Duff in a car; he paralyses Duff in the same manner as his other victims and inserts a long metal object up his nose. A policeman finds Duff and requests an ambulance, and the police tell Mulder and Scully that they are sweeping the area for Aboah. Driving around, Mulder tells Scully that he thinks Aboah is the mythical Teliko.

The agents stop at a demolition site after Mulder remembers that Pendrell found asbestos fibers on Sanders' body. After they split up, Mulder is paralyzed and taken into a duct by Aboah. Scully, having heard Mulder's shouts for help, tracks him in the duct and is able to get him out, finding the depigmented bodies of the other victims. Aboah gets the drop on Scully, but Mulder's look alerts her, and she quickly turns around and shoots him. In her field journal, Scully writes that Aboah is struggling to survive while awaiting trial. She muses that Aboah's condition and survival may be discovered by science, but humans have a fear of an alien among them which causes them to "deceive, inveigle, and obfuscate".

== Production ==
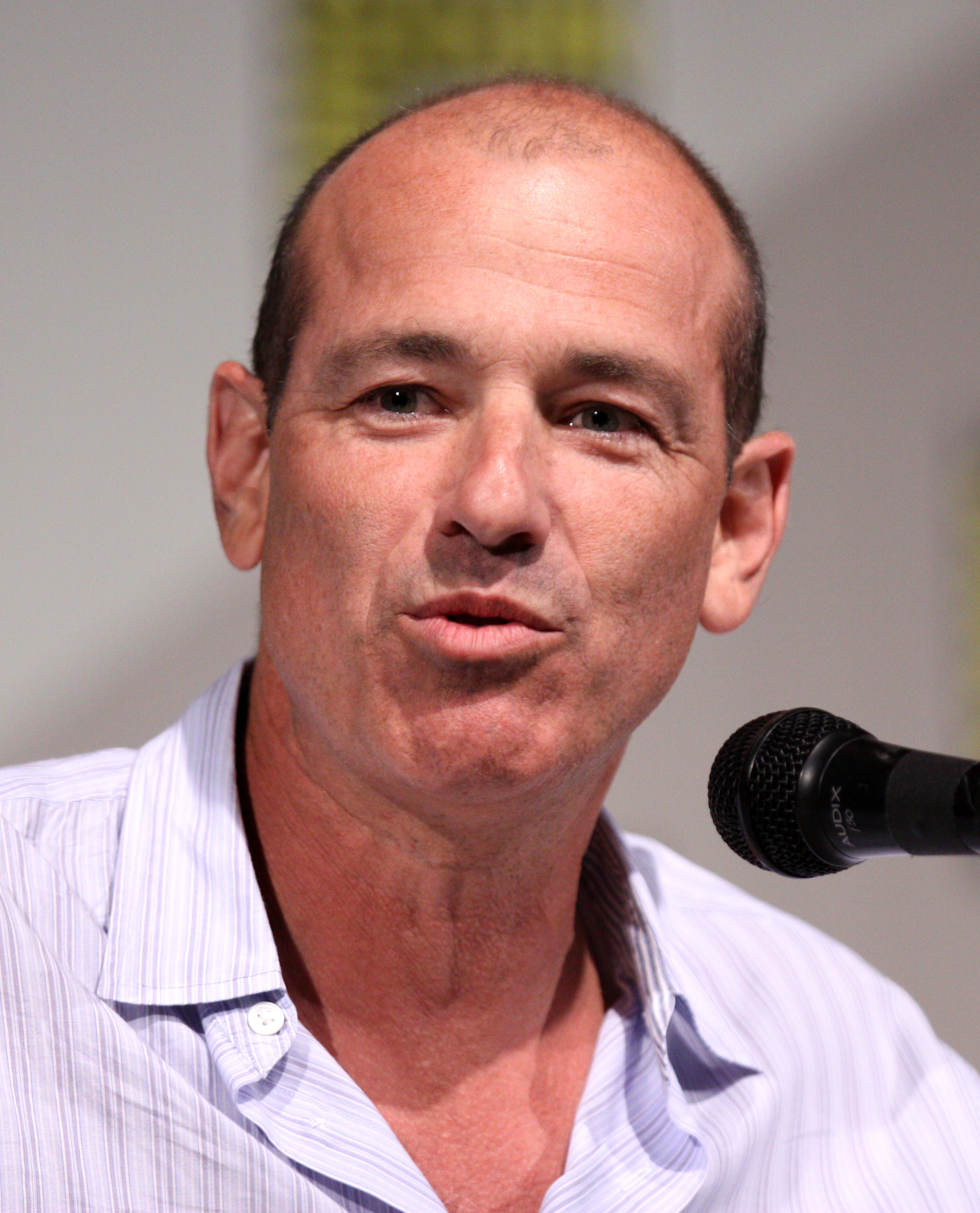
The concept of the episode originated from Howard Gordon, who wanted to write an episode with an immortal antagonist.

Writer and executive producer Howard Gordon was originally working on an episode about someone who appeared to be immortal, but after discussions with consulting producer Ken Horton he added in the notion of xenophobia and "melanin-sucking albino vampires". Series creator Chris Carter approved the storyline, but the first draft of the script was met with disapproval by the writing staff, and the story was restructured and rewritten. As the episode entered pre-production, Carter asked Gordon to refine the script to give it a purpose, and it was then that Gordon came up with the theme of "deceive, inveigle, and obfuscate". This phrase is first spoken by Scully in conversation with Mulder after the post mortem on Owen Sanders, the fourth missing man. Mulder later throws the same phrase back at her in frustration as he leaves the Mt Zion Medical Center (where Aboah has been examined) to meet Diabra, the Burkinabe diplomat. And Scully finally uses the phrase in her field journal during her closing sentiments. The phrase also replaces the usual "The Truth is Out There" tagline during the title sequence of the episode.

Carter also came up with Aboah's weapons used to extract the pituitary gland that he kept hidden in his esophagus. "Teliko" is Greek for "end", though "Téliko" is the name of a "spirit of the air" in Bambara mythology which is sometimes thought to be an albino. Fellow writer John Shiban suggested that the Teliko emerge from the country of Burkina Faso based on his former job of programming foreign air-mail rates for a computer software company.

Casting for the episode was difficult, as the production team wanted real Africans. They auditioned every one they could find, including an African theater troupe that was passing by. The role of Marcus Duff eventually went to Carl Lumbly, who was known for his role on CBS's Cagney & Lacey. The role of Aboah went to Willie Amakye, a Ghanaian Olympic runner who had just returned to his home in Southern California from the 1996 Summer Olympics in Atlanta, Georgia. To appear albino, Amakye's skin underwent several layers of cover-up cream, layers of white powder, and a little pink powder for color. He also wore contacts for the transparent pink eyes. Amakye's hair was dyed orange for post-production special effects to change it back and forth from black and white. As revealed on his resident alien card, Aboah's birthday is September 25, a reference to the birthday of Gillian Anderson's daughter.

"Teliko"'s opening sequence makes use of an airplane cabin set built for the later season episodes "Tempus Fugit" and "Max", though the set's hydraulic shaking rig had not been completed yet. Composer Mark Snow used African drums, flutes, and chants in his score for the episode. He also used samples from "The Bulgarian Women's Chorus", a recording known in Southern California in promotion for a local radio station. Compositions by Snow often utilized elements of African tribal drums, but "Teliko" features rather prominent usage.

== Themes ==
What sustains The X-Files' imagining of otherness is not merely the strangeness of the esoteric, but its coding as opposed to the Law and to civic order. Mapped onto the chronotopes of the dark alleyways of the inner city, this other of the civic order is then easily imagined as that other which resists the Law or, more usually, fails to be fully integrated into the civil order. In the "Teliko" example I have noted from the X-Files, this other is of course the illegal immigrant who lives among the ethnic minorities of his own color and preys upon them. Thus, the image of otherness in The X-Files is conjoined to a major concern of political systems in the West.

—Prof. Ato Quayson of the University of Toronto on the themes of the episode.

"Teliko" explores the concept of the other, with characters of a different race representing the "other". In the episode, the US and its culture are treated as the norm, wherein the African culture in the episode is depicted in an intimidating way. African folk tales, which are not often considered strange in their own context, are presented in the episode as ominous and bizarre. The episode also prominently features African tribal music, and Howard Gordon claimed that linking the supernatural ethnic character to the tribal music added a more "exotic" feeling to the character. However, Allan F. Moore, in his book Analyzing Popular Music, argues that the usage of the music in this episode reinforces a "culturally dangerous slippage between the others."

By making the character seem more unnatural, he exudes in many ways an "extraterrestrial" quality to him. Charles D. Martin mused in The White African American Body that "blackness is clearly attached to racial identity" in the episode, commenting that the episode equates the cultural understanding of race to mere skin color. Martin cites Mulder's joke about Michael Jackson as a self-aware comment on "another contemporary white negro" which reinforces a stereotype.

Zoe Detsi-Diamanti, in her book The Flesh Made Text Made Flesh, commented on the episode's depiction of race. She argues that the episode makes the point that a "perfectly normal" black man looks a certain way, pointing out that the episode states that a black man is defined by a "certain skin pigment". Any exception to this norm is depicted in a negative manner, with science being the only answer to unnatural phenomena. Dean Kowalski agreed with the analysis in The Philosophy of The X-Files, commenting that one of the main themes of the episodes revolved around science's attempt to explain folk theories and paranormal phenomena. The episode's antagonist Aboah, escapes the FBI by fitting into a dinner cart, a feat that was compared to slaves escaping in unconformable slave ships.

== Broadcast and reception ==
"Teliko" originally aired on the Fox network on October 18, 1996. The episode marked the final time that an episode of the series aired on a Friday. This episode earned a Nielsen rating of 11.3, with a 20 share, meaning that roughly 11.3 percent of all television-equipped households, and 20 percent of households watching television, were tuned in to the episode. "Teliko" was seen by 18.01 million viewers on first broadcast.

The episode received generally mixed reviews from critics. Entertainment Weekly gave "Teliko" a grade of "C−", finding it similar to the first season episode "Squeeze". Zack Handlen of The A.V. Club gave it a "B−", also noting its similarity to "Squeeze" and finding that it had uncomfortable racial overtones. However, he did feel that the climax was "wonderfully tense" and "one of the better climaxes the show's done". In his book The Nitpicker's Guide for X-Philes, author Phil Farrand pointed out an inconsistency in the episode; before the timeline of the episode, Aboah only kills four men in three months, but during the duration of the episode he kills two men in a matter of days.

== Bibliography ==
- Diamanti, Zoe Detsi (2007). The Flesh Made Text Made Flesh. Harper Prism.
- Farrand, Phil (1997). The Nitpicker's Guide for X-Philes. Dell Publishing. ISBN 0-440-50808-8.
- Howie, Luke (2009). Terrorism, the Worker and the City. Gower.
- Hurwitz, Matt; Knowles, Chris (2008). The Complete X-Files. Insight Editions. ISBN 978-1-933784-72-4.
- Kowalski, Dean (2007). The Philosophy of The X-Files. The University Press of Kentucky.
- Martin, Charles D. (2002). The White African American Body: A Cultural and Literary Exploration. Rutgers University Press.
- Meisler, Andy (1998). I Want to Believe: The Official Guide to the X-Files Volume 3. Harper Prism. ISBN 9780061053863.
- Moore, Alan F. (2009). Analyzing Popular Music. Cambridge University Press.
- Quayson, Ato (2005). "Postcolonialism and Postmodernism". In Schwarz, Henry; Ray, Sangeeta (eds.). A Companion to Postcolonial Studies. Blackwell Companions in Cultural Studies. Wiley-Blackwell. pp. 87–111.
