= Galyn Görg =

American actress and dancer (1964–2020)

- Born: July 15, 1964; Los Angeles, California, U.S.
- Died: July 14, 2020 (aged 55); Hawaii, U.S.
- Other names: Galyn Gorg; Galan Gorg; Gaylyn Görg
- Occupations: Actress; dancer
- Years active: 1983–2020

Galyn Görg (Note: /ˈɡeɪlɪn ˈdʒɔːrdʒ/ GAY-lin JORJ; last name pronounced as though spelled George) (Note: Also credited as Galyn Gorg, Galan Gorg and Gaylyn Görg) (July 15, 1964 – July 14, 2020) was an American actress and dancer, best known for her role in the film RoboCop 2 as Angie, the villain Cain's girlfriend and subordinate; on M.A.N.T.I.S., television's first black superhero program, as Lt. Maxwell; on the television show Twin Peaks as Nancy O'Reilly; and as a starring dancer on two separate Italian variety shows, Fantastico on the channel RAI and SandraRaimondo Show on the channel Canale 5.

== Early life ==
Görg was born in Los Angeles, California to an actress/model mother of African American, Choctaw, Blackfoot, and Irish descent, and a documentary filmmaker father of German descent. She was raised in Hawaii and majored in liberal arts at Santa Monica City College.

== Career ==
Görg's career began with dancing. Trained in jazz, ballet, Haitian, Afro-Samba, Afro-Cuban, West African, hip-hop, hula and funk, she trained with the Roland Dupree Dance Academy and the Alvin Ailey Summer Program, and went on to work with choreographers such as Debbie Allen, Michael Peters, and Marguerite Derricks. She studied acting with, among other groups, Improv for the People, The Groundlings, and the Pacific Resident Theater.

Görg's work in film, television, music videos and live theatrical performances spanned a multitude of countries, including the Middle East, Italy, Mexico, New Zealand, Canada and other parts of the world. She starred as the love-interest dancer in the iconic ZZ Top music video "Sharp Dressed Man" and achieved fame in Italy as the dance star of two variety series on Italian television: Fantastico (on RAI) and SandraRaimondo Show (on Canale 5).

Görg's best-known role was Lt. Leora Maxwell in the 1994 TV series M.A.N.T.I.S., which was adapted from a film of the same name. The character played by Görg was not present in the film/pilot of the television show, but was added when the show was picked up by Fox Network. There was controversy surrounding the series at the time due to accusations that the producers removed African-American themes to make it more appealing to mainstream viewers.

== Personal life and death ==
Görg was also a professional dancer who lectured at schools and performed all over the world. She died of cancer on July 14, 2020, a day before her 56th birthday. She was diagnosed the week before, after doctors found cancer throughout her body and lungs.

Görg never married and had no children.

== Filmography ==
=== Film ===
Year	Title	Role	Notes
1984	Strangers in Paradise	Hooker	
1985	Mirrors	-	TV movie
1986	America 3000	Lynka	
1986	The Bikini Shop	Cindy	
1986	Living the Blues	Mana Brown	
1987	Down Twisted	Blake	
1988	The Wrong Guys	Carla	
1988	Dance Academy	Jana	
1988	The Wizard of Speed and Time	C.C.'s Groupie	
1988	Nightingales	Lorna	TV movie
1989	When We Were Young	-	TV movie
1990	Sporting Chance	Grace McAllister	TV movie
1990	RoboCop 2	Angie	
1991	Point Break	Margarita	
1992	Storyville	Spice	
1993	Firestorm: 72 Hours in Oakland	Denise Kukuczka	TV movie
1993	Judgment Night	Clarissa	
1994	Temptation	'Toonie' Wells	
2016	A Husband For Christmas	Rebecca	TV movie
2017	The Wrong Student	Detective Mauro	TV movie
2017	The Wrong Crush	Dr. Griffin	TV movie
2018	The Wrong Friend	Mrs. Cramer	TV movie
2018	A Christmas in Royal Fashion	Jill	TV movie
2019	A Christmas Princess	Linda	TV movie
2021	Teller's Camp	Chenoa	Posthumous release

=== Television ===
Year	Title	Role	Notes
1984	Fame	Fame Dancer	Episode: "Secrets"
1985	It's Your Move	Waitress	Episode: "The Experts"
1985	The A-Team	Cathy	Episode: "Knights of the Road"
1985	Cover Up	Sonja	Episode: "Passions"
1985–1986	Fantastico 6	Herself/Co-Host	Main Co-Host: Season 6
1986	Amazing Stories	Ms. Eyeful	Episode: "Miscalculation"
1988	Duet	Gail	Episode: "Mommy and Me"
1989	Jake and the Fatman	Cynthia Davis	Episode: "It All Depends on You"
1989	A Different World	Melissa Swazey	Episode: "Great Expectations"
1990	Twin Peaks	Nancy O'Reilly	Recurring Cast: Season 2
1991	The 100 Lives of Black Jack Savage	Luce	Episode: "The Not-So-Great Dictator"
1992	A Different World	Monica Gilbert	Episode: "Save the Best for Last: Part 2"
1992	Grapevine	Jessica	Episode: "The Jessica and Tony Story"
1992	Hangin' with Mr. Cooper	Yvonne	Episode: "Hangin' with Michelle"
1994–1995	M.A.N.T.I.S.	Lieutenant Leora Maxwell	Main Cast
1995	Star Trek: Deep Space Nine	Korena	Episode: "The Visitor"
1996	The Fresh Prince of Bel-Air	Helena	Episode: "Boxing Helena"
1996	Xena: Warrior Princess	Helen of Troy	Episode: "Beware Greeks Bearing Gifts"
1996	Living Single	Michelle	Episode: "Wake Up to the Break-Up"
1996	Hercules: The Legendary Journeys	Anuket	Episode: "Mummy Dearest"
1996	Star Trek: Voyager	Nori	Episode: "Warlord"
1997	Hang Time	Vice Principal Leslie Williams	Episode: "First Game of the Season"
1997	Stargate SG-1	Kendra	Episode: "Thor's Hammer"
2001	Crossing Jordan	Therapist	Episode: "Pilot"
2004	CSI: Miami	Ms. Art, House Manager	Episode: "After the Fall"
2008	Lost	Nurse	Episode: "Meet Kevin Johnson"
2015	Parks and Recreation	Josephina Academia	Episode: "One Last Ride"
2017	Colony	Gina	Episode: "The Garden of Beasts"
2018	How to Get Away with Murder	Riley	Episode: "Nobody Else Is Dying"
2018	Clarke & DiBella: Hollywood Division	Mother	Episode: "Pilot"

=== Music videos ===
Year	Title	Artist	Role
1983	"I Still Can't Get Over Loving You"	Ray Parker Jr.	Love Interest
1983	"Sharp Dressed Man"	ZZ Top	Girl at Dance Club
1984	"After All"	Al Jarreau	Dancer
1984	"Body"	The Jacksons	Dancer
1984	"Centipede"	Rebbie Jackson	Girl
