= Home (The X-Files) =

- The X-Files episode
- The Peacock family burying their child alive. Due to its graphic nature, as illustrated by this scene, "Home" became the first episode of The X-Files to receive a viewer discretion warning.
- Episode no.: Season 4 Episode 2
- Directed by: Kim Manners
- Written by: Glen Morgan; James Wong
- Production code: 4X03
- Original air date: October 11, 1996
- Running time: 44 minutes

Guest appearances
- Tucker Smallwood as Sheriff Andy Taylor; Sebastian Spence as Deputy Barney Paster; Judith Maxie as Barbara Taylor; Chris Nelson Norris as Edmund Peacock; John Trottier as George Peacock; Adrian Hughes as Sherman Peacock; Karin Konoval as Mrs. Peacock

Episode chronology
← Previous "Herrenvolk"	Next → "Teliko"
- The X-Files season 4

"Home" is the second episode of the fourth season of the American science fiction television series The X-Files, which originally aired on the Fox network on October 11, 1996. Directed by Kim Manners, it was written by Glen Morgan and James Wong. "Home" is a "monster-of-the-week" story, unconnected to the overarching mythology of The X-Files. Watched by 18.85 million viewers, the initial broadcast had a Nielsen rating of 11.9. "Home" was the first episode of The X-Files to carry a viewer discretion warning for graphic content. It would have been the only episode to receive a TV-MA rating upon broadcast, but it aired two months before the December 19, 1996 introduction of the TV Parental Guidelines. Critics were generally complimentary, and praised the disturbing nature of the plot; several made comparisons to the work of director Tobe Hooper. Some reviewers felt the violence was excessive.

The series centers on FBI special agents Fox Mulder (David Duchovny) and Dana Scully (Gillian Anderson), who work on cases linked to the paranormal, collectively called "X-Files". Mulder is a believer in the paranormal; the skeptical Scully was initially assigned to debunk his work, but the two have developed a deep friendship. In this episode, Mulder and Scully investigate the death of a baby born with severe physical defects. Traveling to the small isolated town of Home, Pennsylvania, the pair meet the Peacocks, a family of deformed farmers who have not left their house in a decade. Initially, Mulder suspects the brothers kidnapped and raped a woman to father the child, but the investigation uncovers a long history of incest involving the Peacocks' own mother.

"Home" marks the return of writers Morgan and Wong, who left the show following its second season. They attempted to make the episode as ambitious and shocking as possible and were inspired by real-life events, including the documentary Brother's Keeper and a story from Charlie Chaplin's autobiography about an encounter with a family in rural Wales. The graphic content of the script attracted controversy from early in the production process. Commentators have interpreted the episode as satirizing the American Dream, addressing globalization, and exploring the nature of motherhood. Critics and crew members describe "Home" as a seminal episode of The X-Files.

== Plot ==
In the small town of Home, Pennsylvania, a woman gives birth to a deformed baby. Three similarly deformed men bury it near their dilapidated house during a rainstorm. Fox Mulder (David Duchovny) and Dana Scully (Gillian Anderson) are sent to investigate after the corpse is found by children during a sandlot-ball game. While talking to local sheriff Andy Taylor (Tucker Smallwood), Mulder asks whether the Peacock brothers—the inhabitants of the house nearest to the crime scene—have been questioned. Taylor informs him that the house dates to the Civil War and is without electricity, running water or heat. He also insinuates that the family has been inbreeding since the war. The three Peacock brothers watch the agents from their front porch.

During an autopsy, the agents discover that the baby suffocated by inhaling dirt—meaning that it was buried alive. Scully suggests the baby's defects could have been caused by inbreeding. Mulder insists this hypothesis would be impossible since the Peacocks seem to live in an all-male household. Suspecting the Peacocks have kidnapped and raped a woman, the agents investigate their now-abandoned residence and discover blood, scissors and a shovel on a table. In retaliation, the Peacocks enter Taylor's house during the night and murder him and his wife, Barbara (Judith Maxie).

Laboratory tests indicate the baby's parents were members of the Peacock family. Believing that the three Peacock brothers must be holding the dead baby's mother hostage, the agents and Deputy Barney Paster (Sebastian Spence) go to arrest them. When Paster breaks down the front door of the house, he is decapitated by a booby-trap, before the brothers rip the body apart. Mulder and Scully then release the Peacocks' pigs to lure them out of the house before searching it.

The agents find a quadruple amputee hidden under a bed. She is revealed to be Mrs. Peacock, the mother of the boys. She was presumed dead from a car crash several years previously; however, she survived and continued to have inbred children. Mrs. Peacock reveals that neither she nor anyone in the family can feel pain. The brothers realize Mulder and Scully are inside their house and attack. The two youngest sons withstand several gunshots before dying, one of them impaled on another booby-trap. Afterwards, the agents discover that Mrs. Peacock and her eldest son have escaped in their car, planning to start a new family elsewhere.

== Production ==
=== Background ===
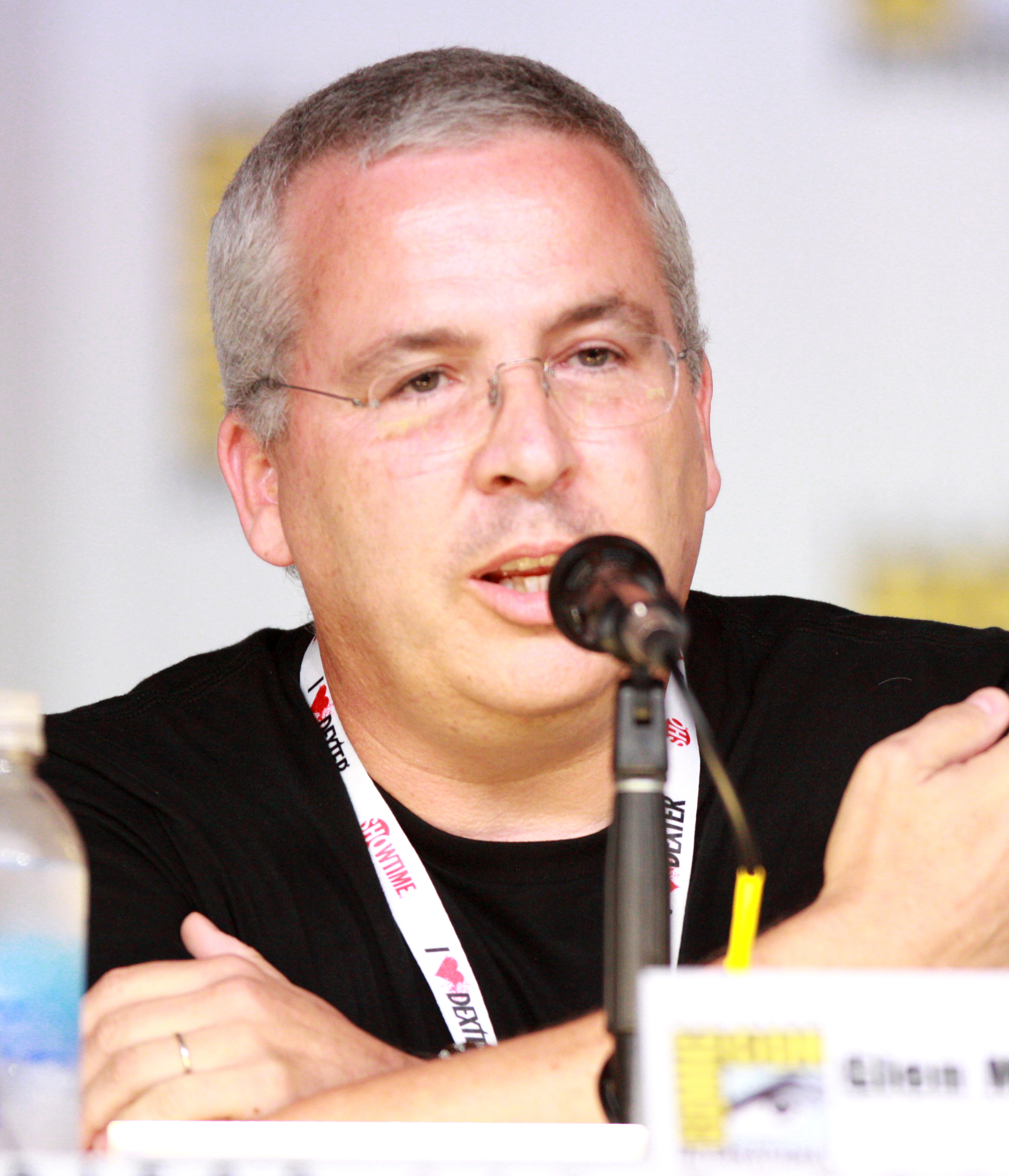
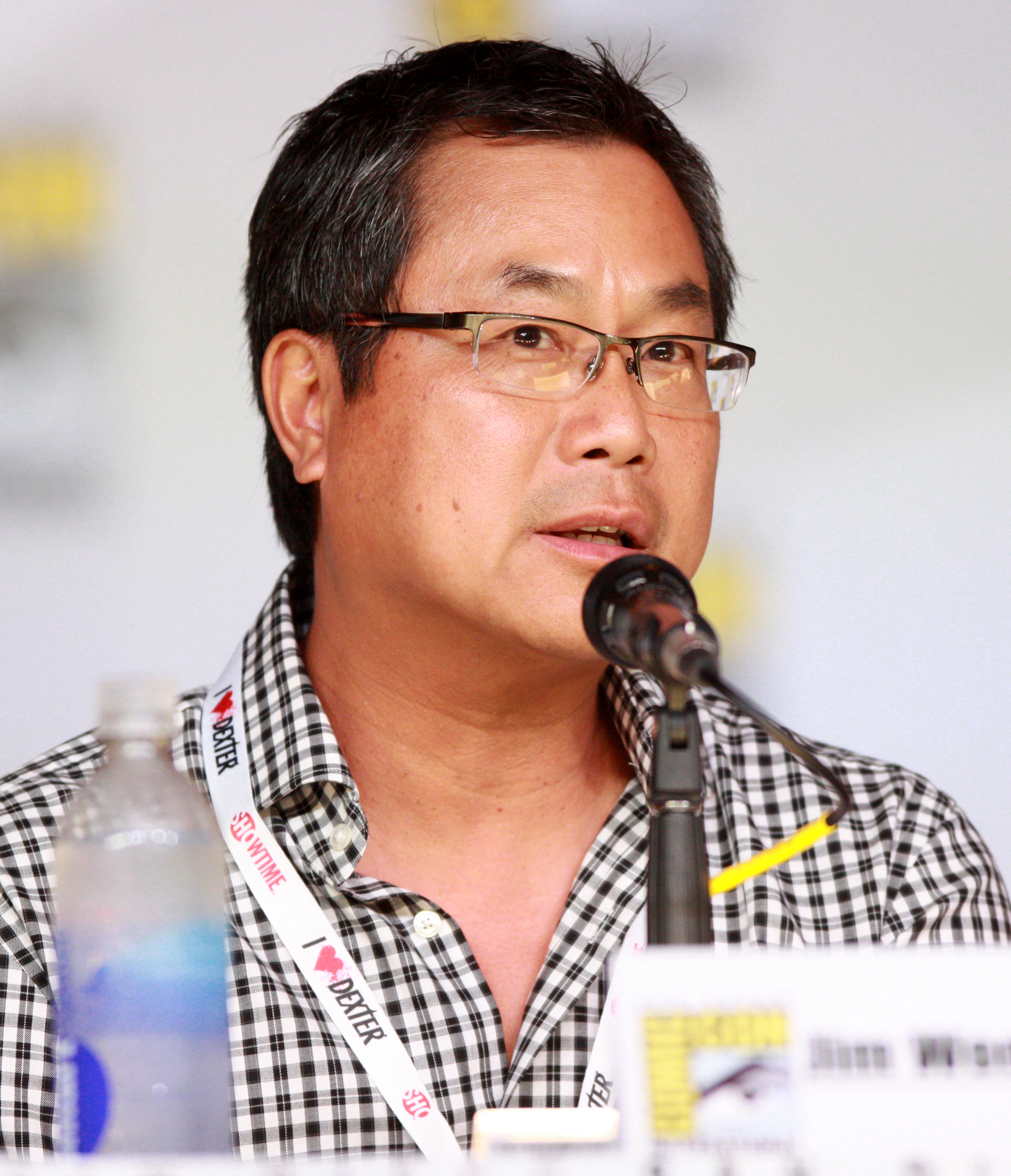
The episode marked the return of former writers Glen Morgan (left) and James Wong (right).

"Home" marked the return of writers Glen Morgan and James Wong, who had left production of The X-Files after the second season to work on other television projects. Before their departure, Morgan and Wong had written many episodes of the series and were instrumental in the success of its first season. The two developed Space: Above and Beyond, a science fiction television series canceled after one season. Subsequently, the two rejoined the staff of The X-Files and became writers for the fourth season. To make an impact for their return, they decided to write an ambitious story and attempted to produce a script shocking enough to push the boundaries of television. Space: Above and Beyond co-star Kristen Cloke advised them to study books about the "dark" side of nature so they could write about subjects like survivalism.

Many actors from Space: Above and Beyond appeared in the fourth season; the first was Tucker Smallwood, who portrays Sheriff Andy Taylor in "Home". When Morgan first pitched the episode to Chris Carter, he specifically described three actors from the show—James Morrison, Rodney Rowland and Morgan Weisser—as the trio of "big freak brothers". The episode contained references to popular television, such as the use of the names Andy Taylor and Barney, and referring to Mayberry, which are references to characters and the fictional town from The Andy Griffith Show.

=== Writing ===
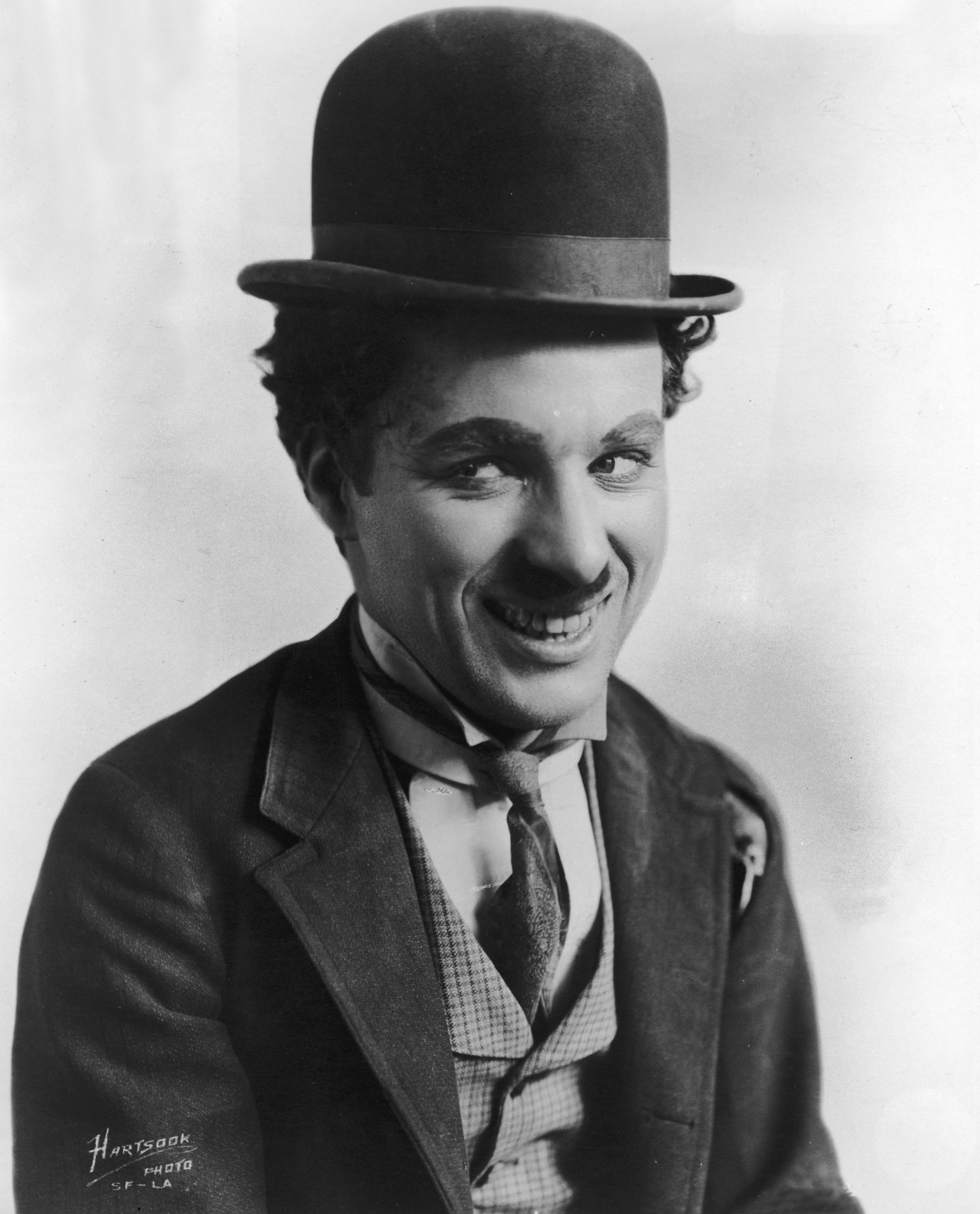
Glen Morgan and James Wong drew inspiration from a story in Charlie Chaplin's autobiography

Sources consulted by the writers included Brother's Keeper (1992), a documentary film depicting the story of the Wards, four "barely literate" brothers who lived on a farm that had been passed on through their family for generations. The brothers drew international attention following the alleged murder of William Ward by his brother Delbert. With an estimated IQ of 68, Delbert escaped prosecution by claiming police had tricked him during interrogation. Wong chose to base the Peacock family on the Wards, incorporating their lifestyles into the script. The name "Peacock" came from the former neighbors of Morgan's parents.

Further inspiration came from a story in Charlie Chaplin's autobiography; while touring with a musical theatre production, he stayed at a miner's tenement home in Wales. After dinner, the host introduced Chaplin to a disfigured and legless man named Gilbert who slept in a kitchen cupboard; Glen Morgan incorrectly recalled this as a totally limbless boy who was kept under a bed. Chaplin described the man as "a half man with no legs, an oversize blond flat-shaped head, a sickening white face, a sunken nose, [and] a large mouth" who could jump using his arms, but this was misremembered by Morgan as though the man had no limbs and "flopp[ed] around" while the family sang and danced. Morgan used his memory of this incident within the screenplay, although at Wong's suggestion they changed the character to the boy's mother. The episode was also made as an homage to 1970s horror films such as Tobe Hooper's The Texas Chain Saw Massacre (1974) and Wes Craven's The Hills Have Eyes (1977).

It took some time for the concepts to come together into a story; elements first appeared in the second season episode "Humbug", written by Morgan's brother Darin and featuring a cast of circus sideshow performers. The episode incorporated several themes that had an influence on "Home", including the use of a "benign soul trapped in the body of a monster".

When director Kim Manners read the script for "Home", he called it "as classic a horror script [as] I'm ever going to see." The producers, on the other hand, felt the show had gone too far, and called it "tasteless". William B. Davis, the actor who portrayed the series' main antagonist The Smoking Man, argued that the screenplay read like Morgan and Wong deliberately wanted to go back to the stylistic origins of the series.

=== Filming and post-production ===
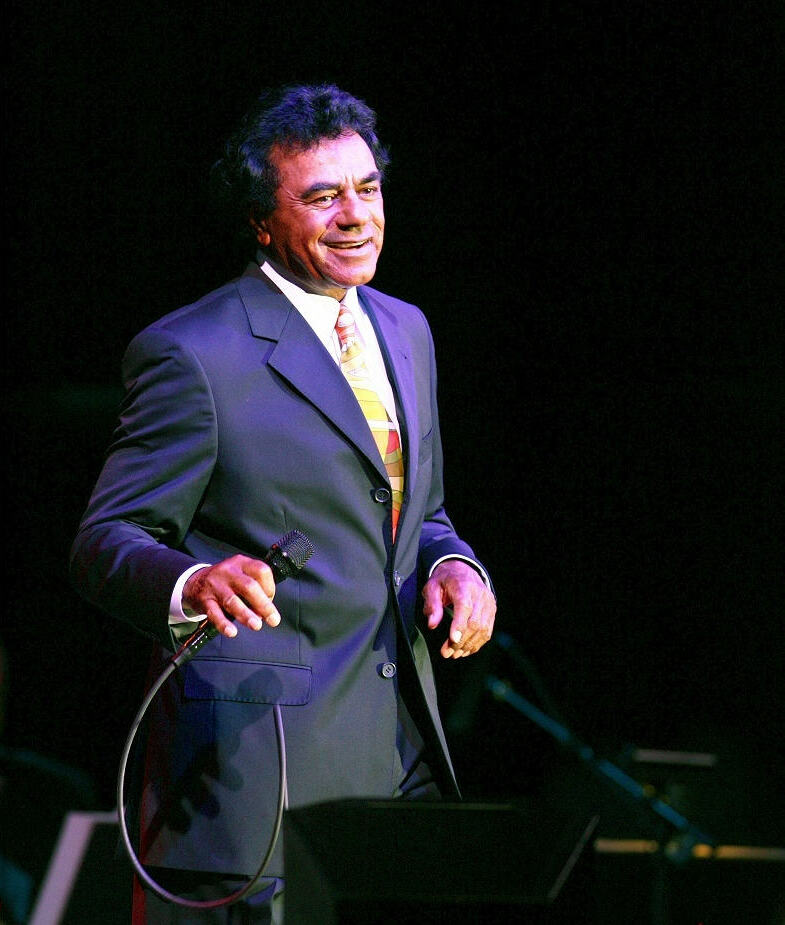
Johnny Mathis refused to allow his version of "Wonderful! Wonderful!" to be used in "Home", due to the episode's content.

Like the rest of the fourth season, "Home" was filmed in British Columbia. Most of the scenes depicting buildings were shot in the town of Surrey, British Columbia, with the exterior of the Langley Community Hall in Fort Langley doubling as Home's sheriff's station. As the town's architecture comprised both old and new styles, careful reverse angles were employed to preserve the impression of "small-town America". The building used as the Peacock house had been previously utilized in the season two episode "Aubrey". At that time, the producers noted that the house had been "untouched for years" and was "so good" they had to return to film it again. The car that the Peacock family drives in the episode was found on a farm outside Vancouver. It was rented and restored for use in the episode. Cadillac later sent the producers a letter thanking them for including one of their cars in the show.

After the episode aired, Tucker Smallwood recalled that the filming was an unpleasant experience. He entered production of the episode with little knowledge of the nature of The X-Files, and was surprised when he received the screenplay. During his first day on set, he asked other cast members if the series was always so violent. An unidentified crew member said, "this is awful even for us", and commented that it was probably the most gruesome episode of the series run. During the sheriff's death scene Smallwood insisted on performing his own stunts, until he hit his head attempting a dive. Another uncomfortable moment for the actor involved lying face down in a pool of fake blood for more than 90 minutes.

The episode incorporates the song "Wonderful! Wonderful!" by musician Johnny Mathis. Having read the screenplay Mathis refused to allow his version to be used, owing to the episode's graphic content, and a cover version had to be created. Producer David Nutter, who had a background as a singer, intended to record the vocals but at the last minute another singer who sounded more like Mathis was hired. Manners explained that he wanted to use the song because "certain songs [like 'Wonderful! Wonderful!'] have a creepy, icky quality that none of us have really openly acknowledged".

"Home" was first submitted to the censors featuring audio of the baby screaming while being buried alive. Fox executives asked Ten Thirteen Productions to alter the audio so that the baby would sound sick; they noted that the audio change was needed to show the child was diseased and that the Peacocks were not simply killing an innocent child. Manners called the shot, shown from the child's perspective, of the baby's burial as "the most awful shot of my career". He said that he approached filming as seriously as he could because he felt the script was a classic. When production was finished, Manners declared that it was one of his favorites. Duchovny agreed with Manners, saying, "I really like that one. Although it didn't scare me." He explained that it "touched" him with its themes concerning the desire to "live and to propagate."

== Themes ==
"Home" was interpreted as presenting a satirical view of traditional family values, showcasing the conflict between classic American values and more modern culture. The town of Home encompasses the traditional values of the nuclear family—only for it to be victimized by the Peacock family—who are seen as representing the darker side of paradise. The town depicted in "Home" showcases the positive qualities of a world without globalization, but the Peacock family exhibit the negative aspects. The episode's closing scene has been described as "quintessentially American", featuring the final Peacock brother driving away in a white Cadillac with his mother "safely stowed in the trunk", ready to explore a brand new life.

The concept of motherhood is also explored in the episode. According to Elyce Rae Helford, in her book Fantasy Girls: Gender in the New Universe of Science Fiction and Fantasy Television, Mrs. Peacock functions as a being who has been reduced "to all female functions" by her sons. She is "the grotesquely willing mother who has lost any sense of individual purpose" other than to do anything for her children. Sonia Saraiya of The A.V. Club writes how "Scully's sympathy for a mother that she imagines to be persecuted is turned violently on its head, to reveal a monster whose priorities are not quite so straightforward." The episode is also one of the first to explore Scully's desire to become a mother. Grant Bain states that the episode presents the dual nature of Scully's "modern desire for motherhood", as opposed to Mrs. Peacock's "perverted notion of family". Helford writes that the entry predicts "Scully's fate as the mother of 'immaculately' (technologically) conceived and monstrous progeny". In the fifth season, Scully indeed learns that she is a mother, albeit accidentally, after her ova were harvested following her abduction in the second season, and an alien/human hybrid named Emily is the result. With the revelation that Scully is pregnant at the end of the seventh season finale, "Requiem", the concept revolving around Scully as a mother took center stage in seasons eight and nine with the birth of baby William.

Emily St. James of Vox believes the episode "perfectly reflected its particular moment in time" as regards technology entering the backwoods:

America was changing, becoming much more interconnected. There wasn't much room left for obscure, local urban legends. It's perhaps no mistake, then, that The X-Files debuted in 1993, shortly before the internet became a major part of everyday life, and ended in 2002, after it had completely revamped and reworked everything we once knew. Mulder and Scully's frequent use of cellphones was seen as a bit of a novelty in early seasons, but by the end the technology was ubiquitous. ... There's perhaps no better example of this than The X-Files' deeply scary season four classic "Home." A spooky old house on the edge of a small Pennsylvania town proves to be the center of a breeding experiment decades in the making... Yet in the '90s, the three brothers' crimes will be investigated by Mulder and Scully, modern America coming to flush them out."

The use of the up-tempo "Wonderful! Wonderful!" during a violent murder sequence attracted attention for its contrasting presentation. Jan Delasara in X-Files Confidential called the murder of Sheriff Taylor and his wife the most "chilling moment in the series' run", highlighted by the use of a bouncy, classic pop song. It further establishes the episode's subversion of nostalgia, by using a well-known pop song during a death scene.

== Broadcast and reception ==
=== Initial ratings and reception ===
"Home" originally aired on the Fox network on October 11, 1996. It had a Nielsen rating of 11.9, with a 21 share, meaning that roughly 11.9 percent of all television-equipped households, and 21 percent of households watching television, were tuned in to the episode. It was watched by 18.85 million viewers. "Home" was the only episode of The X-Files to carry a TV-MA rating and the first that would have received a viewer discretion warning for graphic content if the system had been present at the time, with the opening scene being cited in particular due to its gruesomeness and its similarity to "stock horror film conventions". The only other instance of an episode of The X-Files earning a viewer discretion warning was in the season eight episode, "Via Negativa". Owing to that content, the network would only repeat the episode once on Halloween 1999, three years after the original airing. This was the only time, in the history of the series, that this happened. In 1997, when the channel FX ran an all-day marathon of the most popular X-Files episodes, "Home" was the number one choice.

Upon its first broadcast, "Home" received several positive reviews from critics, although some were critical of its violence. Entertainment Weekly gave the episode an "A", describing it as "one of TV's most disturbing hours" and as "a cinematic feast for the eyes, packed with audacious wit".

Among less favorable reviews, author Phil Farrand called "Home" his least-favorite episode of the first four seasons of the show in his book The Nitpicker's Guide to the X-Files, writing that he "just [did not] get this episode" because "Mulder and Scully seem reckless" and the Peacock brothers "are better suited for comic books". Paul Cornell, Keith Topping, and Martin Day, in their book X-Treme Possibilities, were critical of the violent content of the episode. Topping called the episode "sick", Cornell felt that Mulder and Scully's wisecracks made them come off as cruel, and Day felt that the violence went overboard. Day, however, offered a few complimentary observations, noting that "Home" did, indeed, have merit, and that the juxtaposition of "Wonderful! Wonderful!" with the violent antics of the Peacocks was something "David Lynch would be proud of".

=== Later reception ===
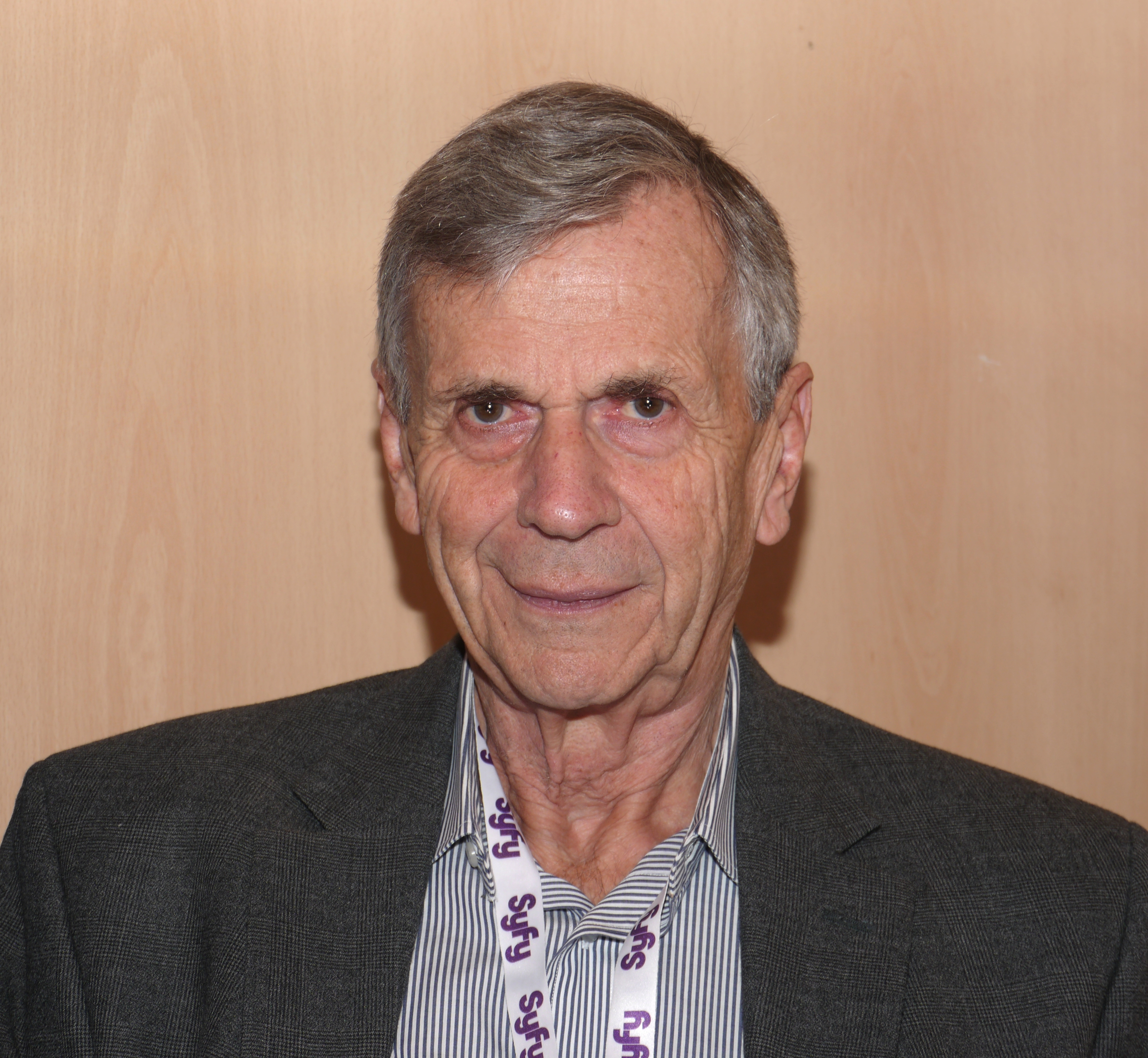
Series regular William B. Davis notes that because the episode was so incredibly gruesome, some fans questioned if they should continue watching the series.

"Home" has continued to receive positive reviews. In a 2011 review, Emily St. James of The A.V. Club gave the episode an "A" rating and wrote that it would be difficult to write an episode like "Home" today, since small towns are no longer as isolated as they used to be, thanks to modern communications technology. She praised the depiction of urban sensibilities and the frightening Peacock family, observing that it represented a "sad farewell to a weird America that was rapidly smoothing itself out." Author Dean A. Kowalski, in The Philosophy of The X-Files, cited "Home", "Squeeze", and "The Host" as the most notable "monster-of-the-week" episodes.

"Home" has often been cited as one of the best X-Files episodes. Rolling Stone ranked it the third best of all the episodes on their "Every Episode Ranked From Worst to Best" list, calling it "one the very best episodes throughout the entire series, with its unrelenting commitment to telling a story of pure darkness. ... There aren't many hours of television that are tougher to watch than 'Home,' but it's phenomenal viewing." Emily St. James of The A.V. Club placed it among the 10 best chapters of the series and called it one of the scariest hours of television she had seen. In 2009, The Vancouver Sun named "Home" one of the best stand-alone episodes of the series and wrote that, because of its horrific theme of incest, the episode "doesn't pull any punches". Den of Geek writer Nina Sordi placed the entry as the fourth best of the series in 2009, viewing its bleak humor and "thought-provoking moments" of dialogue as the factors that made it one of the most popular episodes. In 2008, Starpulse gave the installment an honorable mention as one of the 10 best X-Files episodes. In 2009, Connie Ogle from PopMatters rated the Peacock family among the greatest monsters of the series and stated that it was a miracle that the program "slipped past" the censors. Kat Hughes of The Companion wrote that "perhaps the most frightening thing of all about 'Home' though, is its ending. Here [the series] ventures into territory that many horror movies dare not – it doesn’t resolve the issue. There is no happy ending, the good guys didn’t win, and the bad guys are still out there, ready to – as Mrs. Peacock states – “begin again”."

Critics have also named "Home" one of the scariest installments of the series. Novelist Scott Heim in The Book of Lists: Horror rated it as the tenth most frightening television broadcast. Heim wrote that several aspects of the episode were creepy, including the gothic house and the family itself. Tom Kessenich, in his 2002 book Examination: An Unauthorized Look at Seasons 6–9 of the X-Files, listed the program as the fifth best of the series. Kessenich reported that it was the pinnacle of the horror episodes featured on The X-Files. William B. Davis said that "Home" was both well written and well directed, but was so gruesome that it led to some fans questioning whether or not they wanted to continue watching the series. He argued that modern horror films were far more violent than anything depicted in "Home" but, at the time, "it was quite disturbing." In 2017, Vulture.com named "Home" the most terrifying television episode to watch on Halloween.

== Bibliography ==
- Booker, M. Keith (2002). Strange TV: Innovative Television Series From The Twilight Zone To The X-Files. Santa Barbara, CA: Greenwood Publishing Group. ISBN 9780313323737.
- Booker, M. Keith, ed. (2012). Blue-Collar Pop Culture. Santa Barbara, CA: Praeger. ISBN 9780313391989.
- Cornell, Paul; Day, Martin; Topping, Keith (1998). X-Treme Possibilities: A Comprehensively Expanded Rummage Through Five Years of the X-Files. London: Virgin. ISBN 9780753502280.
- D'Imperio, Chuck (2006). Great Graves of Upstate New York!. Bloomington, IN: AuthorHouse. ISBN 9781420896763.
- Davis, William B. (2011). Where There's Smoke: Musings of a Cigarette Smoking Man, a Memoir. Toronto: ECW Press. ISBN 9781770410527.
- Delasara, Jan (2000). PopLit, PopCult and The X-Files: A Critical Exploration. Jefferson, NC: McFarland & Company. ISBN 9780786407897.
- Farrand, Phil (1997). The Nitpicker's Guide for X-Philes. New York City: Dell Publishing. ISBN 9780440508083.
- Gradnitzer, Louisa (2002). X Marks the Spot: On Location With The X-Files. Vancouver: Arsenal Pulp Press. ISBN 9781551520667.
- Heim, Scott (2008). Wallace, Amy (ed.). The Book of Lists: Horror. New York City: Harper Perennial. ISBN 9780061537264.
- Helford, Elyce Rae (2000). Fantasy Girls: Gender in the New Universe of Science Fiction and Fantasy Television. Lanham, MD: Rowman & Littlefield. ISBN 9780847698356.
- Hurwitz, Matt; Knowles, Chris (2008). The Complete X-Files: Behind the Series the Myths and the Movies. San Rafael, CA: Insight Editions. ISBN 9781933784724.
- Johnson-Smith, Jan (2005). American Science Fiction TV: Star Trek, Stargate, and Beyond. Middletown, CT: Wesleyan University Press. ISBN 9780786443154.
- Kellner, Douglas (2003). Media Spectacle. London: Routledge. ISBN 9780415268295.
- Kessenich, Tom (2002). Examinations: An Unauthorized Look at Seasons 6-9 of the X-Files. Trafford Publishing. ISBN 1553698126.
- Lowry, Brian (1995). The Truth is Out There: The Official Guide to the X-Files. New York City: Harper Prism. ISBN 9780-061053306.
- Meisler, Andy (1998). I Want to Believe: The Official Guide to the X-Files. New York City: Harper Perennial. ISBN 9780061053863.
- Merritt, Greg (1999). Celluloid Mavericks: A History of American Independent Film Making. New York City: Harper Perennial. ISBN 9781560252320.
- Niemi, Robert (2006). History in the Media: Film and Television. Santa Barbara, CA: ABC-CLIO. ISBN 9781576079522.
- Peterson, Mark C. E.; Flannery, Richard; Louzecky, David (2007). Kowalski, Dean A. (ed.). The Philosophy of The X-Files. Lexington, KY: University Press of Kentucky. ISBN 9780813192277.
- Short, Sue (2011). Cult Telefantasy Series. Jefferson, NC: McFarland & Company. ISBN 9780786443154.
- Smallwood, Tucker (2006). Return To Eden. Lulu. ISBN 9781847281692.
- Soter, Tom (2001). Investigating Couples: A Critical Analysis of the Thin Man, the Avengers and The X-Files. Jefferson, NC: McFarland & Company. ISBN 9780786411238.
- Waddell, Terrie (2006). Mis/takes: Archetype, Myth and Identity in Screen Fiction. London: Routledge. ISBN 9781583917213.
- Wallace, Amy; Howison, Del; Heim, Scott (2008). The Book of Lists: Horror: An All-New Collection Featuring Stephen King, Eli Roth, Ray Bradbury, and More, with an Introduction by Gahan Wilson. New York City: Harper Perennial. ISBN 9780061537264.
