= Ma'alefa'ak =

DC Comics supervillain

- Ma'alefa'ak as depicted in Martian Manhunter (vol. 4) #10 (May 2016). Art by Eddy Barrows.

Publication information
- Publisher: DC Comics
- First appearance: Martian Manhunter (vol. 2) #0 (October 1998)
- Created by: John Ostrander and Tom Mandrake

In-story information
- Alter ego: Ma'alefa'ak J'onzz
- Species: Green Martian
- Place of origin: Mars
- Team affiliations: Legion of Doom
- Notable aliases: Malefic; Malefic Jones
- Abilities: Superhuman strength, speed, durability and endurance; Regenerative healing factor; Flight; Invulnerability; Intangibility/Phasing; Invisibility; Shapeshifting; Telekinesis; Telepathy; Martian vision; Nine senses

Ma'alefa'ak (also known as Malefic and Malefic Jones) is a supervillain appearing in American comic books published by DC Comics, usually depicted as the archenemy of his twin brother, the superhero Martian Manhunter. Created by writer John Ostrander and artist Tom Mandrake, the character first appeared in Martian Manhunter (vol. 2) #0 (October 1998).

The character has appeared in various media outside comics. He appeared in the animated film Justice League: Doom, voiced by Carl Lumbly; the live-action series Supergirl, portrayed by Phil LaMarr; and the animated series Young Justice, where he is voiced by Benjamin Diskin and depicted as a White Martian.

== Publication history ==
The character first appears in a flashback sequence in Martian Manhunter (vol. 2) #0 (October 1998) and in a storyline in the same title in issues #3–6 (February–May 1999) by writer John Ostrander and artist Tom Mandrake.

== Fictional character biography ==
Ma'alefa'ak is a native of the planet Mars, and his parents were influential in Martian society: his mother, J'ahrl J'onzz, and his father, M'yrnn J'onzz. He is the younger twin brother and was already prophesied to be his brother's arch-nemesis, J'onn J'onzz, also known as the Martian Manhunter. Twins are rare on Mars, and Martian society believed that twins were meant to be one amalgam, divided between light and darkness. His mother, a precognitive mystic, had a vision before their birth, in which she saw that one of her sons would betray their people, while the other would become the champion of their race. As a result, she named one of her sons J'onn J'onzz, which means 'Light to the Light', and the other Ma'alefa'ak, meaning 'darkness in the heart'. Ma'alefa'ak grew up feeling like an outcast among his people, with only his twin's love, the only one who did not reject him.

While J'onn grew up to become a Manhunter, a police officer, Ma'alefa'ak turned to science, becoming a scientist and sorcerer. He turned against his people and despised his culture, even his own relatives, especially his mother, whom he blamed for what he became. Following a failed attempt to find the Anti-Life Equation, Ma'alefa'ak's memories, pyrophobia, and telepathy are removed and he is made to believe that he was born lacking the latter. Ma'alefa'ak later kills the Martians with a psychic curse, which J'onn survives by temporarily sealing his telepathy.

With his race destroyed and Martian Manhunter on Earth, Ma'alefa'ak lives alone on Mars for centuries. After learning that J'onn is alive, Ma'alefa'ak follows him to Earth and attempts to kill him. However, J'onn erases Ma'alefa'ak's telepathic block, leading him to be consumed by the sun.

In The New 52 continuity reboot, Ma'alefa'ak is reintroduced in a 2015 storyline in which the Earth-born survivors of the Martian extinction build a weapon to infiltrate and enslave Earth.

== Powers and abilities ==
Ma'alefa'ak possesses abilities similar to Martian Manhunter and all other Green Martians. The character has superhuman levels of strength, stamina speed and durability. Other base abilities include "Martian vision" (projecting energy beams from his eyes). Complete control of his molecular structure also allows Ma'alefa'ak to shapeshift, regenerate, and utilize invisibility and intangibility. Ma'alefa'ak also possesses telekinesis, and originally possessed telepathy, although this ability was removed by the Council of Mars.

Although Martians can be weakened by fire and suffer from pyrophobia ("H'ronmeer's Curse"), Ma'alefa'ak did not share this weakness due to the removal of his telepathic abilities. When Martian Manhunter removed the telepathic block instilled by the Council, Ma'alefa'ak regained his telepathic abilities but was also once again susceptible to fire, his vulnerability stronger than the standard Green Martian due to his lack of experience at resisting the flames.

== In other media ==
=== Television ===
- Ma'alefa'ak appears in Young Justice, voiced by Benjamin Diskin. This version is a White Martian named M'comm M'orzz, the younger brother of M'gann, and the son of a White Martian father and Green Martian mother who feels that White Martians are oppressed by the Green and Red Martians, describing the former as "a superstitious, cowardly lot" and taking his codename from a Martian creature to strike terror in them. In the fourth season, Ma'alefa'ak allies with Darkseid and is given the planet Durla to establish a White Martian community.
- Malefic J'onzz appears in Supergirl, portrayed by Phil LaMarr as an adult, Marcello Guedes as a boy, and Domonique Robinson as a teenager. This version, amidst a civil war between the Green and White Martians, betrayed the former to help the latter. Subsequently, he was imprisoned in the Phantom Zone and all memory of him was erased from the Martians' collective consciousness. In the fourth season finale "The Quest for Peace", the Monitor frees Malefic from the Phantom Zone and releases him on Earth-38 to seek vengeance on his brother J'onn J'onzz. Throughout the fifth season, Malefic battles Supergirl and J'onn until he is captured by Lena Luthor, who seeks to exploit his psionic powers, before he is rescued by and reconciles with J'onn. After helping the Department of Extranormal Operations foil Luthor's plans, Malefic returns to Mars, where he brings peace between the Green and White Martians.

=== Film ===
Ma'alefa'ak appears in Justice League: Doom, voiced by Carl Lumbly. This version is a member of Vandal Savage's Legion of Doom.

=== Video games ===
Ma'alefa'ak appears as a character summon in Scribblenauts Unmasked: A DC Comics Adventure.

=== Miscellaneous ===
Ma'alefa'ak appears in Batman: The Brave and the Bold #18. This version is a White Martian.
