= Nightjohn (film) =

1996 American TV film

- Genre: Drama
- Based on: Nightjohn by Gary Paulsen
- Written by: Bill Cain
- Directed by: Charles Burnett
- Starring: Allison Jones; Beau Bridges; Carl Lumbly; Lorraine Toussaint; Bill Cobbs; Gabriel Casseus
- Music by: Stephen James Taylor
- Country of origin: United States
- Original language: English

Production
- Executive producer: David Manson
- Producer: Dennis Stuart Murphy
- Cinematography: Elliot Davis
- Editor: Dorian Harris
- Running time: 92 minutes
- Production company: Sarabande Productions

Original release
- Network: Disney Channel
- Release: June 1, 1996

Nightjohn is a 1996 American television drama film directed by Charles Burnett and written by Bill Cain, based on the 1993 novel of the same name by Gary Paulsen. It aired on Disney Channel as one of its Premiere Films, on June 1, 1996.

The film is about a young slave girl named Sarny, played by Allison Jones, who lives a hopeless life on a Southern plantation. Her job is to take care of the white family's son as well as spitting tobacco on the roses to keep bugs away. Her life is changed when she is taught how to read by a fellow slave. The slave, John, says that learning to read is freedom because slavery is bounded by laws and deeds which the slaves cannot read. Her excitement towards reading gets her and her fellow slaves in trouble with their master, Mr. Wallace, who prohibits any slave from being able to read. When trouble ensues, Sarny uses her ability to read against Mr. Wallace and saves the lives of the rest of the slaves. She ends up being sold, but not before she shows her fellow slaves the letter 'A'.

== Plot ==
Sarny, a girl, is born in a slave cabin. Her master Clel Waller is angry, saying that a boy would've been worth more. However, he doesn't sell her, as a promise has been made, so her mother is sold after a few years instead. Sarny is taken care by Delie, another slave.

When Sarny grows to about pre-teenage years, she starts working at the Big House, taking care of Homer, the master's son who is not potty-trained yet. Back at the cabins, Outlaw tries to get Delie to convince Mr. Waller to give him a pass so he can marry a girl named Egypt from another plantation. Delie is preparing a dress for Sarny so she can go to work at the master's house.

After a Sunday church service in which slaves and masters attend, the Wallers have guests over for lunch, among them a doctor who later has a romance with Callie, Clel's wife who, during the luncheon, talks about Outlaw wanting to court Egypt, owned by Clel's brother. Clel shuts her down stating that if they were to have a baby, it would give money to the wife's plantation instead of his. Callie asks why things cannot just be about love. Upset about Clel's decision, Sarny accidentally drops the plate of food, and is punished when Clel forces Callie to slap the girl. That night Delie tells Sarny to behave, otherwise she will have to do the hard labor out in the fields. Sarny is upset, vowing revenge on the Wallers.

The next day, Callie tells Sarny to take a letter to the doctor's place. On the way, she sees a slave trader, Tom, herding black slaves toward the Waller household. At the doctor's house, the doctor asks Sarny to take a love letter to Callie, keeping it a secret from Clel. He then gives Sarny a penny for her troubles. Back at the plantation, Tom is willing to sell a slave to Clel for 500 dollars. Clel then questions Tom about why he is willing to sell a slave worth $3000 for only $500. Clel then asks the slave to take off his shirt, revealing many scars from being whipped. Clel says that instead, he will buy the man, John, off of Tom for only 50 dollars without clothes.

That night, John and Sarny strike a deal, willing to trade tobacco for lessons on reading. John tells Sarny about the risks, but Sarny accepts as she wants to be free. Sarny learns the letter ‘A’. She then starts to read the letter ‘A’ in the letters between the doctor and Callie that she delivers.

The next morning, Outlaw is being punished because he snuck out the previous night to see Egypt. As Mr. Waller is about to whip Outlaw, Jeffrey, Clel's son, asks him to stop because they are friends. Clel say to Jeffrey that the slaves were made to pick his cotton instead of being his friend, and Outlaw is whipped. In Sarny's narration of the story, she states that Clel watched everyone instead of the one person he needed to watch, the mistress, his wife.

That night when the Wallers are having a party, Delie walks in on John teaching Sarny the alphabet and is outraged. She questions John about the scars on his back, and he says that they were because he had tried to run away twice. The third time, however, he successfully got away to the North but ended up coming back in order to teach slaves how to read. Delie prohibits John from teaching Sarny to read for her safety. Sarny stalks away, stating that she will teach herself to read. John agrees but says that Delie is teaching Sarny something worse: to be afraid.

Sarny later comes up with a plan for Callie to visit the Doctor secretly, offering to potty-train Homer and swipes his alphabet blocks. This angers a slave, Old Man who had had a finger chopped off after he had learned to read. John shouts out that words are freedom, that the white folks keep words to themselves and that if the slaves had words, they would be free. Later that night, John writes Sarny's name in the dirt saying that the letters meant herself.

The next day, Clel recruits everyone in his family to help with picking cotton from the fields, promising a feast to everyone if they are successful with the crop. Later that day when John lovingly teaches Sarny numbers, Delie agrees to learn as well. Sarny reads the bible and is baptized.

It is revealed Sarny had stolen a bible that Jeffrey, the master's other son was supposed to take care of which gets him in trouble from his father. She discovers that she had been lied to and that God was on the slave's side. As Sarny begins to read more and more, the rest of the slaves reject it and tell her to stop. She begins to read a story in the Gazette newspaper about a slave insurrection (Nat Turner's and his army of slaves), capturing the other slaves’ attention. Sarny then tricks Homer into playing hide and seek so she can go back and read Clel's record book. The Waller plantation had a good crop of cotton this year and as promised, Clel throws a feast. The slaves use this opportunity to let Outlaw and Egypt get married.

It is discovered later that Egypt is pregnant and is forced to run away. John forges Clel's signature for Outlaw and his wife so they can escape. Jeffrey discovers the stolen bible, and Delie takes the blame. Clel tries to figure out who had taken the bible because he knows that Delie did not know how to read. With no one confessing, Jeffrey whips Delie once. As he tries to continue, he is stopped by John who says that he was the one who took it. This results in Clel chopping off John's fingers as punishment. When asked if he had learned his lesson, John writes letters in the dirt. Jeffrey tells the overseer to take John to be sold before his father can shoot him. As he is leaving, John tells Sarny "when you lose one hand, the other gets stronger", meaning that she must forge the other note and teach other slaves how to read. John had written his name in the dirt. Sarny is then seen forging the second note for Outlaw and telling them to name their baby John if it was a boy.

The next morning, Sarny tells the doctor she can no longer keep his secret. Clel interrupts the service saying that he has found two notes written and signed with his name in two different handwritings, meaning that another slave knows to write and threatens to shoot all of them. Sarny objects, saying that Clel would not shoot them because they are his only wealth. She tells Clel that she is worth the most to him because of what she knows. Callie, fearing this, ask Clel to just shoot her. The doctor intervenes, lying that he taught Egypt how to read simple things. Thinking everything has been solved, Sarny is finally sold, and as she narrates, she explains that the story is about her and Nightjohn and that there is a bit of John in all of the slaves.

== Cast ==
- Allison Jones as Sarny – taken care of by Delie after her mother was sold.
- Carl Lumbly as John – a slave bought by Clel who had escaped to the North, but had given freedom up so he can teach slaves how to read.
- Lorraine Toussaint as Delie – acts like a mother to Sarny and is initially against learning how to read.
- Bill Cobbs as Old Man – the oldest member of the slaves who is respected by everyone.
- Beau Bridges as Clel Waller – cold-hearted owner of the slaves and a cotton plantation.
- Kathleen York as Callie Waller – Clel's wife who has an affair with the doctor. She is seen as being kind and sympathetic to the slaves.
- Gabriel Casseus as Outlaw – a slave who had fallen in love with a girl from another plantation.
- Monica Ford as Egypt – Outlaw's love interest.
- John P. Ford III as Jeffrey Waller – Clel's oldest son who sees the slaves as friends.
- Damian and Auneccia Chatman as Baby Sarny

== Production ==
Filmed on location in Gable, South Carolina at Rip Raps plantation, Nightjohn is a movie that depicts the lives of African American slaves in the antebellum South. Literacy plays an important part in the struggle for power between the slaves and their masters. The idea of keeping slaves illiterate was a tool for white Southerners to keep the slaves subordinate. Without the ability to read, slaves were often tricked into doing things that they did not want to do. They weren't able to read the laws or deeds that affected their future and resulted in them becoming slaves. After the civil war had ended, there was a problem pertaining to what to do for the African American people. With slavery's stabilizing influence gone, the Freedmen's Bureau was created to remedy the situation. It proposed that they should educate the former slaves and advance the reconciliation between the North and the South. They also hoped that it would create a lasting peace and order between the different races. The bureau also sought to create schoolhouses in order to regain the stability lost by the end of slavery.

== See also ==
- List of films featuring slavery
