= John Kenneth Muir =

American media historian, author (born 1969)

- Born: December 3, 1969 (age 56); Glen Ridge, New Jersey, U.S.
- Education: University of Richmond
- Occupations: Film historian; media critic; author
- Writing career
- Years active: 1996–present
- Genres: Science fiction; horror
- Website: www.johnkennethmuir.com

John Kenneth Muir (born December 3, 1969) is an American media historian, critic and speculative fiction author. He has written more than 35 reference books in the fields of film and television, with a particular focus on the horror and science fiction genres. He is the former department chair for Humanities and Social Sciences at South Piedmont Community College, North Carolina, a position he served from 2018-2021.

== Career ==
Muir was born in Glen Ridge, New Jersey. He attended the University of Richmond from 1988 to 1992. He cites Pauline Kael and Roger Ebert as influences.

He began his full-time writing career in 1996, authoring several books for McFarland & Company. He also has written monographs on science fiction television, including Exploring Space: 1999 (1997), An Analytical Guide to Battlestar Galactica (1998), A Critical History of Dr. Who on TV (1999), A History and Critical Analysis of Blake's 7 (1999) and An Analytical Guide to TV's One Step Beyond (2001).

He has written a book about Kevin Smith titled An Askew View: The Films of Kevin Smith, a study of Sam Raimi titled The Unseen Force: The Films of Sam Raimi, a book on horror television called Terror Television: American Series 1970–1999, and another on the works of Christopher Guest, Best in Show: The Films of Christopher Guest and Company.

=== Works of fiction ===
Muir's first novel, published in 2003, was a licensed Space: 1999 continuation titled The Forsaken. He followed this with The Whispering Sea in 2014. His other fiction includes the Space: 1999 short stories "Futility" and "The Touch of Venus", as well as Farscape short stories for Official Farscape Magazine.

==== The House Between ====
In 2006, Muir wrote and directed a science fiction web series titled The House Between.

Muir has also written two novellas in the House Between series: Enter The House Between Book #1: Arrived and Enter The House Between Book #2: Settled, both published in 2022.

==== Abnormal Fixation ====
In 2024 Muir wrote, directed and starred in an independent web series called Abnormal Fixation, a mockumentary comedy-horror series about the hapless Elvis Bragg (Muir), a paranormal investigator seeking to win a contest against an organization called SKEPTI-COP by proving the existence of the Woodpyre Mill Phantom.

=== Media appearances ===
Muir's TV appearances include E! True Hollywood Story: "Curse of The Exorcist". On radio, he has been a guest on Destinies: The Voice of Science Fiction, NiteShift, Good Morning Charlotte, The Allan Handelman Show, and The Mitch Albom Show.

In 2007, Muir appeared as a commentator in Decade of Darkness, a special feature on the Collector's Edition DVD release of The Return of the Living Dead. He also appeared in the 2009 documentary Nightmares in Red, White and Blue. In 2010 he was a judge at the Acefest NYC2010 Film Festival.

== Bibliography ==
- Horror Films 2000–2009 (McFarland & Company, 2022)
- Joss Whedon FAQ (Applause Theater and Cinema Books, 2019)
- The X-Files FAQ (Applause Theater and Cinema Books, 2015)
- Space:1999 The Whispering Sea (Powys Media, 2014)
- Horror Films FAQ (Applause Theater and Cinema Books; 2013)
- Music on Film: Purple Rain (Limelight Editions; 2012)
- Horror Films of the 1990s (McFarland & Company, 2011)
- Music on Film: This is Spinal Tap (Limelight Editions; 2010)
- Space: 1999 Shepherd Moon ("The Touch of Venus," "Futility") (Powys Media, 2010)
- Ken Russell: Re-Viewing England's Last Mannerist ("As the (White) Worm Turns: Ken Russell as God and Devil of Rubber-Reality Horror Cinema") (Scarecrow Press, 2009)
- Battlestar Galactica and Philosophy ("SALTed Popcorn") (Open Court, 2008)
- TV Year Volume 1: The Complete 2005–2006 Prime Time Season (Applause Theater and Cinema Books, 2007)
- The Rock and Roll Film Encyclopedia (Applause Theater and Cinema Books, 2007)
- Horror Films of the 1980s (McFarland & Company, 2007)
- Mercy in Her Eyes: The Films of Mira Nair (Applause Theatre and Cinema Books, 2006)
- Singing a New Tune: The Re-Birth of the Modern Film Musical, from Evita to De-Lovely and Beyond (Applause Theatre and Cinema Books, 2005)
- Best in Show: The Films of Christopher Guest & Company (Applause Theatre and Cinema Books, 2004)
- The Unseen Force: The Films of Sam Raimi (Applause Theatre and Cinema Books, 2004)
- The Encyclopedia of Superheroes on Film and Television (McFarland & Company, 2004)
- Space: 1999 – The Forsaken (Powys Media, 2003)
- Eaten Alive At A Chainsaw Massacre: The Films of Tobe Hooper (McFarland & Company, 2003)
- An Askew View: The Films of Kevin Smith (Applause Theatre and Cinema Books, 2002)
- Horror Films of the 1970s (McFarland & Company, 2002)
- An Analytical Guide to Television's One Step Beyond, 1959–1961 (McFarland & Company, 2001)
- Terror Television: American Series, 1970–1999 (McFarland & Company, 2001)
- The Films of John Carpenter (McFarland & Company, 2000)
- A History and Critical Analysis of Blake's 7, the 1978–1981 British Television Space Adventure (McFarland & Company, 1999)
- A Critical History of Doctor Who on Television (McFarland & Company, 1999)
- An Analytical Guide to Television's Battlestar Galactica (McFarland & Company, 1999)
- Wes Craven: The Art of Horror (McFarland & Company, 1998)
- Exploring Space: 1999 – An Episode Guide and Complete History of the Mid-1970s Science Fiction Television Series (McFarland & Company, 1997)

=== Liner notes and forewords ===
- Space: 1999 Aftershock and Awe by Andrew Gaska (Boom Entertainment, 2012)
- Lexicon of the Planet of the Apes by Rich Handley (Hasslein Books, 2010)
- The House Between: Original Internet Television Score CD booklet (Powys Media, 2010)

== Awards and nominations ==
- Best Screenplay, Abnormal Fixation, Oniros Film Awards, August 2024
- Best Screenplay, Abnormal Fixation, Florence Film Awards, January 2025
- Enter The House Between: AVA Digital Platinum Award for Best Audio Production/Drama, 2024
- The Encyclopedia of Superheroes on Film and Television: New York Public Library's "Best of Reference" Selection, 2005
- Horror Films of the 1970s: Booklist Editors' Choice for 2002; "Outstanding Reference Source" for 2003 by RUSA (Reference and User Services Association), and "Best of the Best" Reference Book for 2002 by the American Library Association
- Terror Television: Booklist Editors' Choice for 2001
- Nomination: Airlock Alpha Award for Best Web Production, The House Between (2009)
- Nomination: SyFy Portal Genre Award for Best Web Production, The House Between: "Returned" (2008)
