= Terror Television: American Series 1970–1999 =

Book by John Kenneth Muir

Terror Television American Series 1970-1999
- Author: John Kenneth Muir
- Language: English
- Publisher: McFarland
- Publication place: United States
- Pages: 685

Terror Television: American Series 1970–1999 is an American reference book by John Kenneth Muir that documents television horror shows from 1970 to 1999.

== Format ==
The book is categorized into three parts. Part 1, "The Horror Series", chronicles three types of programs. First the anthology series features shows including Night Gallery, Tales from the Darkside, and Tales from the Crypt, Second the adventure format includes shows like The X-Files, Kolchak: the Night Stalker and Buffy the Vampire Slayer. Third the soap opera format includes Twin Peaks, Kindred: the Embraced and American Gothic. Part 2, "If It Sounds Like Horror..." features series including Amazing Stories, The Munsters Today, Nowhere Man and Sabrina, the Teenage Witch. Part 3, "Further Thoughts" compiles lists including the 10 Best and 10 worst terror television shows.

== Reception ==
Booklist gave a positive review citing it as "useful" and praising the author's dedication.
