= John Carl Buechler =

American film director (1952–2019)

- Born: June 18, 1952; Belleville, Illinois, United States
- Died: March 18, 2019 (aged 66); Los Angeles, California, United States
- Other name: Allen Actor
- Occupations: Film director, make-up artist, screenwriter
- Years active: 1978–2019
- Spouse: Lynn Buechler
- Children: 3

John Carl Buechler (pronounced Beekler; June 18, 1952 – March 18, 2019) was an American special make-up effects artist, film director, producer, screenwriter, and actor. He was best known for his work on horror and science-fiction films, mostly as part of Charles Band's Empire Pictures, and directed films such as Troll, Friday the 13th Part VII: The New Blood, Cellar Dweller, Ghoulies III: Ghoulies Go to College, and Curse of the Forty-Niner. His make-up work includes Ghoulies, From Beyond, Troll, TerrorVision, Dolls, Prison, A Nightmare on Elm Street 4: The Dream Master, Halloween 4: The Return of Michael Myers, and Hatchet.

After he was diagnosed with Stage IV prostate cancer, his wife set up a GoFundMe page to help pay for medical expenses. Buechler died on March 18, 2019.

== Filmography ==
=== Special Make-Up Effects ===
- Dr. Heckyl and Mr. Hype (1980)
- Sorceress (1982)
- Forbidden World (1982)
- The Prey (1983)
- Mausoleum (1983)
- Deathstalker (1983)
- The Dungeonmaster (1984)
- Trancers (1984)
- Re-Animator (1985)
- Ghoulies (1985)
- Troll (1986)
- Eliminators (1986)
- TerrorVision (1986)
- From Beyond (1986)
- Dolls (1987)
- Ghoulies II (1987)
- The Garbage Pail Kids Movie (1987)
- Prison (1987)
- Cellar Dweller (1988)
- Friday the 13th Part VII: The New Blood (1988)
- A Nightmare on Elm Street 4: The Dream Master (1988)
- Halloween 4: The Return of Michael Myers (1988)
- Arena (1989)
- Robot Jox (1989)
- Bride of Re-Animator (1990)
- Ghoulies III: Ghoulies Go to College (1991)
- Freddy's Dead: The Final Nightmare (1991)
- Demonic Toys (1992) uncredited
- Carnosaur (1993)
- Carnosaur 2 (1995)
- Project Metalbeast (1995)
- Halloween: The Curse of Michael Myers (1995)
- Watchers Reborn (1998)
- A Light in the Forest (2002)
- Deep Freeze (2002)
- Curse of the Forty-Niner (2002)
- Grandpa's Place (2004)
- The Gingerdead Man (2005)
- Saurian (2006)
- Hatchet (2006)
- The Strange Case of Dr. Jekyll and Mr. Hyde (2006)
- Gingerdead Man 2: Passion of the Crust (2008)

=== Director ===
- The Dungeonmaster (1984)
- Troll (1986)
- Cellar Dweller (1988)
- Friday the 13th Part VII: The New Blood (1988)
- Ghoulies III: Ghoulies Go to College (1991)
- Land of the Lost, season 1, episodes 4, 7, 11 (1991)
- Watchers Reborn (1998)
- A Light in the Forest (2002)
- Deep Freeze (2002)
- Curse of the Forty-Niner (2002)
- Grandpa's Place (2004)
- Saurian (2006)
- The Strange Case of Dr. Jekyll and Mr. Hyde (2006)
- The Eden Formula (2006)
- Dark Star Hollow (2011)

=== Producer ===
- Deep Freeze (2002)

=== Writer ===
- The Dungeonmaster (1984)
- Troll (1986) (uncredited)
- Demonwarp (1988) (story)
- A Light in the Forest (2002)
- Saurian (2006)
- The Eden Formula (2006)
- The Strange Case of Dr. Jekyll and Mr. Hyde (2006)

=== Actor ===
- Hatchet (2006) (Jack Cracker)
- His Name Was Jason: 30 Years of Friday the 13th (2009) (Himself)
- Hatchet II (2010) (Jack Cracker)
- Crystal Lake Memories: The Complete History of Friday the 13th (2013) (Himself)
