= List of awards and nominations received by Alias =

This is the list of awards and nominations received by the American television series Alias (2001–2006).

== Awards and nominations ==
Awards and nominations received by Alias
Award	Year	Category	Nominee(s)	Result	Ref.
ALMA Awards	2006	Outstanding Television Series	Alias	Nominated	
ALMA Awards	2006	Outstanding Director of a Television Drama or Comedy	Jay Torres (for "Out of the Box")	Nominated	
American Choreography Awards	2001	Outstanding Fight Choreography	"Truth Be Told (Pilot)"	Won	
American Cinema Editors Awards	2001	Best Edited One-Hour Series for Television	"Truth Be Told (Pilot)"	Nominated	
American Society of Cinematographers Awards	2001	Outstanding Achievement in Cinematography in Episodic TV Series	"Time Will Tell"	Nominated	
American Society of Cinematographers Awards	2002	Outstanding Achievement in Cinematography in Episodic TV Series	"Page 47"	Nominated	
Art Directors Guild Awards	2001	Excellence in Production Design – Episode of a Single-Camera Series	"Reckoning"	Nominated	
Art Directors Guild Awards	2002	Excellence in Production Design – Episode of a Single Camera TV Series	"Cipher"	Won	
Art Directors Guild Awards	2003	Excellence in Production Design – Single Camera TV Series		Nominated	
Art Directors Guild Awards	2004	Excellence in Production Design – Single Camera TV Series	"Legacy"	Nominated	
Artios Awards	2001	Best Casting for Television – Dramatic Episodic	Alias	Nominated	
Artios Awards	2001	Best Casting for Television – Dramatic Pilot	Alias	Nominated	
Artios Awards	2002	Best Casting for Television – Dramatic Episodic	Alias	Nominated	
Artios Awards	2003	Best Casting for Television – Dramatic Episodic	Alias	Nominated	
Golden Globe Awards	2002	Best Actress – Drama Series	Jennifer Garner	Won	
Golden Globe Awards	2002	Best Television Series – Drama	Alias	Nominated	
Golden Globe Awards	2003	Best Actress – Drama Series	Jennifer Garner	Nominated	
Golden Globe Awards	2004	Best Actress – Drama Series	Jennifer Garner	Nominated	
Golden Globe Awards	2005	Best Actress – Drama Series	Jennifer Garner	Nominated	
People's Choice Awards	2002	Favorite Television New Drama Series	Alias	Won	
People's Choice Awards	2005	Favorite Television Drama	Alias	Nominated	
Primetime Emmy Awards	2002	Outstanding Lead Actress in a Drama Series	Jennifer Garner	Nominated	
Primetime Emmy Awards	2002	Outstanding Supporting Actor in a Drama Series	Victor Garber	Nominated	
Primetime Emmy Awards	2002	Outstanding Writing for a Drama Series	J. J. Abrams (for "Truth Be Told (Pilot)")	Nominated	
Primetime Emmy Awards	2003	Outstanding Lead Actress in a Drama Series	Jennifer Garner	Nominated	
Primetime Emmy Awards	2003	Outstanding Supporting Actor in a Drama Series	Victor Garber	Nominated	
Primetime Emmy Awards	2003	Outstanding Supporting Actress in a Drama Series	Lena Olin	Nominated	
Primetime Emmy Awards	2004	Outstanding Lead Actress in a Drama Series	Jennifer Garner	Nominated	
Primetime Emmy Awards	2004	Outstanding Supporting Actor in a Drama Series	Victor Garber	Nominated	
Primetime Emmy Awards	2005	Outstanding Lead Actress in a Drama Series	Jennifer Garner	Nominated	
Primetime Creative Arts Emmy Awards	2002	Outstanding Art Direction for a Single-Camera Series	"Truth Be Told (Pilot)"	Won	
Primetime Creative Arts Emmy Awards	2002	Outstanding Casting for a Drama Series		Nominated	
Primetime Creative Arts Emmy Awards	2002	Outstanding Cinematography for a Single-Camera Series	"Truth Be Told (Pilot)"	Won	
Primetime Creative Arts Emmy Awards	2002	Outstanding Costumes for a Series	"Truth Be Told (Pilot)"	Nominated	
Primetime Creative Arts Emmy Awards	2002	Outstanding Hairstyling for a Series	"Q & A"	Nominated	
Primetime Creative Arts Emmy Awards	2002	Outstanding Makeup for a Series (Non-Prosthetic)	"Q & A"	Nominated	
Primetime Creative Arts Emmy Awards	2002	Outstanding Single-Camera Picture Editing for a Series	"Q & A"	Nominated	
Primetime Creative Arts Emmy Awards	2002	Outstanding Stunt Coordination	"Time Will Tell"	Nominated	
Primetime Creative Arts Emmy Awards	2003	Outstanding Art Direction for a Single-Camera Series	"Phase One"	Nominated	
Primetime Creative Arts Emmy Awards	2003	Outstanding Cinematography for a Single-Camera Series	"Double Agent"	Nominated	
Primetime Creative Arts Emmy Awards	2003	Outstanding Costumes for a Series	"Phase One"	Nominated	
Primetime Creative Arts Emmy Awards	2003	Outstanding Hairstyling for a Series	"The Counteragent"	Nominated	
Primetime Creative Arts Emmy Awards	2003	Outstanding Makeup for a Series (Non-Prosthetic)	"The Counteragent"	Won	
Primetime Creative Arts Emmy Awards	2003	Outstanding Single-Camera Picture Editing for a Drama Series	"Phase One"	Nominated	
Primetime Creative Arts Emmy Awards	2003	Outstanding Sound Editing for a Series	"Phase One"	Nominated	
Primetime Creative Arts Emmy Awards	2003	Outstanding Stunt Coordination	"The Telling"	Won	
Primetime Creative Arts Emmy Awards	2004	Outstanding Art Direction for a Single-Camera Series	"Taken"	Nominated	
Primetime Creative Arts Emmy Awards	2004	Outstanding Cinematography for a Single-Camera Series	"Conscious"	Nominated	
Primetime Creative Arts Emmy Awards	2004	Outstanding Hairstyling for a Series	"Unveiled"	Nominated	
Primetime Creative Arts Emmy Awards	2004	Outstanding Sound Editing for a Series	"Resurrection"	Nominated	
Primetime Creative Arts Emmy Awards	2004	Outstanding Sound Mixing for a Single-Camera Series	"Hourglass"	Nominated	
Primetime Creative Arts Emmy Awards	2004	Outstanding Stunt Coordination	"Resurrection"	Nominated	
Primetime Creative Arts Emmy Awards	2005	Outstanding Costumes for a Series	"Tuesday"	Nominated	
Primetime Creative Arts Emmy Awards	2005	Outstanding Hairstyling for a Series	"Nocturne"	Nominated	
Primetime Creative Arts Emmy Awards	2005	Outstanding Stunt Coordination	"The Awful Truth"	Nominated	
Primetime Creative Arts Emmy Awards	2006	Outstanding Hairstyling for a Series	"There's Only One Sydney Bristow"	Nominated	
Primetime Creative Arts Emmy Awards	2006	Outstanding Stunt Coordination	"Reprisal" and "All the Time in the World"	Nominated	
Producers Guild of America Awards	2003	Television Producer of the Year – Episodic Drama	Alias	Nominated	
Satellite Awards	2002	Best Actress – Drama Series	Jennifer Garner	Nominated	
Satellite Awards	2002	Best Series – Drama	Alias	Nominated	
Satellite Awards	2002	Best Supporting Actor – Drama Series	Victor Garber	Won	
Satellite Awards	2002	Best Supporting Actor – Drama Series	Ron Rifkin	Nominated	
Satellite Awards	2002	Best Supporting Actress – Drama Series	Lena Olin	Nominated	
Satellite Awards	2003	Best Actress – Drama Series	Jennifer Garner	Nominated	
Satellite Awards	2003	Best DVD Release – TV Series	Alias season 2	Won	
Satellite Awards	2003	Best Supporting Actress – Drama Series	Lena Olin	Nominated	
Satellite Awards	2004	Best Actress – Drama Series	Jennifer Garner	Nominated	
Satellite Awards	2004	Best DVD Release – TV Series	Alias season 3	Nominated	
Satellite Awards	2006	Best DVD Release – TV Series	Alias season 5	Nominated	
Screen Actors Guild Awards	2003	Outstanding Actress – Drama Series	Jennifer Garner	Nominated	
Screen Actors Guild Awards	2004	Outstanding Actress – Drama Series	Jennifer Garner	Won	
Teen Choice Awards	2004	Choice TV Show – Drama/Action Adventure	Alias	Nominated	
Teen Choice Awards	2004	Choice TV Actress – Drama/Action Adventure	Jennifer Garner	Won	
Visual Effects Society Awards	2005	Outstanding Supporting Visual Effects – Broadcast Program	"The Index"	Nominated	
Visual Effects Society Awards	2006	Outstanding Supporting Visual Effects – Broadcast Program	"All the Time in the World" and "Reprisal"	Nominated	
