= Deep Freeze (film) =

- theatrical poster as Ice Crawlers
- Directed by: John Carl Buechler
- Screenplay by: Robert Boris; Dennis A. Pratt; Matthew Jason Walsh
- Story by: Robert Boris
- Produced by: John Carl Buechler; James Rosenthal
- Starring: Götz Otto; David Millbern; Alexandra Kamp; Karen Nieci; Howard Holcomb; Jack Krieger; Allen Lee Haff; David Lenneman; Rebekah Ryan; Norman Cole; Billy Maddox; Tunde Babalola; Robert Axelrod
- Cinematography: Tom Calloway
- Edited by: JJ Jackson
- Music by: Ken Williams
- Production company: Regent Productions
- Distributed by: Regent Worldwide Sales
- Release date: November 10, 2001; (Germany)
- Running time: 80 minutes
- Country: United States
- Language: English

Deep Freeze (also known as Ice Crawlers) is a 2001 horror film directed by John Carl Buechler. Written by Robert Boris, Dennis A. Pratt, and Matthew Jason Walsh, the film was shot in Germany in 2001. The film was retitled Ice Crawlers for United States release.

== Plot ==
The Geotech Company has set up a large Antarctic base to drill for oil. The facility is staffed by Dr. Monica Kelsey, Nelson Schneider, and six workers. During a raging storm, a research team arrives by helicopter, forced to land due to an even worse storm approaching, sent by Geotech to investigate the death of a worker named Lenny, the disappearance of workers Carl and Lippski, and mysterious tremors hitting the area, hoping to learn the cause of these events before the arrival of a United Nations investigation team who might shut down the base. The team's leader, Professor Ted Jacobson, has romantic ties to Dr. Kelsey. The rest of his team are four post-grad students: Arianna, Tom, Update, and Curtis. A giant black trilobite makes its appearance and attacks Dr. Kelsey. One by one, the rest get picked off by the monster.

== Cast ==
- Götz Otto as Nelson
- Robert Axelrod as Lenny
- Norman Cole as Munson
- Rebekah Ryan as Kate
- Allen Lee Haff as Curtis
- Alexandra Kamp-Groeneveld as Dr. Monica Kelsey
- Karen Nieci as Arianna
- Howard Holcomb as Tom
- David Millbern as Ted Jacobson
- David Lenneman as Update
- Billy Maddox as Clyde
- Tunde Babalola as Shockley
- Brad Sergi as Jack Krieger

== Reception ==
MJ Simpson notes that the film was directed and produced "by effects legend John Carl Buechler". Speaking toward the giant monster trilobite of the film, he writes, "it wouldn’t be a John Carl Buechler movie without a deadly rubber monster puppet", clarifying "Of course, it has to be considerably more deadly and carnivorous than trilobites are believed to have been". He also noted that although the writing team had otherwise decent work to their credit, "three credited writers don’t necessarily make for a good script and this one’s a clunker." Toward the makeup and creature effects, he granted that "to be fair, the trilobite is a well-done effect, especially when seen scuttling across the floor," but that as an antagonist is "just such a dopey concept for a monster." He also found flaw with production design and "sloppiness" of the screen credits. He concluded, "It’s got a few thrills, a few unintentional laughs, and a bunch of exterior stock footage from The Thing, but there’s a certain amount of depth to the characters and there are no wannabe scream queens in the cast, which is a blessing."

Dread Central lists the criteria that viewers should look for to pre-determine that this film is a bad one: its premise is derivative of Alien, the plotline of the film "blatantly copies that of more than one famous genre film", that special effects specialists "rarely ever succeed when taking the director’s chair", the special effects are unremarkable, the director is already known for Ghoulies 3, and the lead writer is the man responsible for Backyard Dogs. The reviewer then lambasts the monster, a trilobite with the seeming and inexplicable power of teleportation and mind reading. Dubbing the creature "Trilly", the reviewer writes, "Trilly, you see, is no ordinary man-eating, prehistoric insect awoken from an icy slumber. No, Trilly has magical powers that your typical man-eating, prehistoric insect didn’t have. Trilly seems to be psychic. Much like Santa, Trilly knows when you are sleeping and knows when you’re awake, and really knows when you’re taking a bath or shower. Most importantly, Trilly knows when you’re alone. It becomes numbing the sheer number of times there are several people in a room discussing whatever, but the moment one of them is alone in that room, Trilly suddenly strikes, having apparently hid somewhere in the room waiting patiently for the very moment when someone would be left alone. It’s ridiculous how often this happens." He notes that the plot makes no attempt to explain how the creature is able to roam so freely and so quickly for a large and slow beast. He concludes that the film "takes itself way too seriously given the silly concept of a killer prehistoric roach", writing that it appeared that "Buechler was trying to make a 1950’s style creature feature but mistakenly chose to go about things with the mentality of a modern slasher flick". "There is no suspense here, and most shocking, given the director’s pedigree, we don’t even get any good kills. Despite being directed by a guy that has created more than his fair share of gory effects for the movies, Ice Crawlers is surprisingly anemic."

Scott Weinberg of eFilmCritic Reviews noted that "Roger Corman is still churning out the schlock," writing that "Ice Crawlers (a.k.a. Deep Freeze) is a whole lot like John Carpenter's The Thing - minus the craftsmanship, the artistry, and the talent." His conclusion was that the film was "one of director J.C. Buechler's least professional efforts".
