= A Nice Day for a Posh Wedding =

- Ugly Betty episode
- Episode no.: Season 2 Episode 7
- Directed by: James Hayman
- Written by: Silvio Horta; Marco Pennette
- Original air date: November 8, 2007
- Running time: 43 minutes

Guest appearances
- Victoria Beckham as herself; David Blue as Cliff St. Paul; Bud Cort as Priest; Julia Fowler as Wedding Helper; Rick Fox as Dwayne; Jenny Lind as Reporter No. 1; Arloa Reston as Reporter No. 2; Derek Riddell as Stuart McKinney; Alec Mapa as Suzuki St. Pierre; Vera Wang as herself

Episode chronology
← Previous "Something Wicked This Way Comes"	Next → "I See Me, I.C.U."
- Ugly Betty season 2

"A Nice Day for a Posh Wedding" is the seventh episode of the second season of the American television comedy drama Ugly Betty and the series's 30th episode overall. It was written by Silvio Horta and Marco Pennette, and directed by James Hayman. The episode was originally broadcast on ABC in the United States on November 8, 2007. Ugly Betty centers on Betty Suarez's job at the fashion magazine MODE, despite not fitting their expectations of beauty and style. In this episode, MODE's creative director Wilhelmina Slater attempts to marry the magazine's publisher Bradford Meade.

Victoria Beckham guest-stars as herself in the episode, appearing as Wilhelmina's maid of honor who steals attention from the wedding. She was originally supposed to wear a fatsuit as part of a joke about weight gain. Vanessa Williams's ex-husband, retired basketball player Rick Fox, appears as Wilhelmina's bodyguard and lover. Vera Wang makes a cameo appearance, and designed Wilhelmina's wedding dress and Beckham's bridesmaid dress. Wang first drafted a larger taffeta wedding dress, but Williams felt it was inappropriate for Wilhelmina's age and requested a simpler design. The wedding was filmed over several days at the First Congregational Church of Los Angeles.

The episode was publicized through a TV Guide cover and a fictional wedding announcement in The New York Times. "A Nice Day for a Posh Wedding" was well received by critics who praised Beckham's cameo and Becki Newton's cover of Kelis's 2003 single "Milkshake" during the wedding. It received two nominations for a Primetime Emmy Award and an NAACP Image Award. The scenes about Ignacio Suarez's United States citizenship ceremony attracted attention from academic scholars. The initial broadcast of the episode was viewed by 10.9 million viewers and number one in its time slot for adults between the ages of 18 and 34.

== Plot ==
Betty Suarez (America Ferrera) has moved out of her familial home following an argument with her father Ignacio (Tony Plana) over her relationship with Henry Grubstick (Christopher Gorham), who has impregnated another woman and has decided to move to Tucson, Arizona to care for the child. As a result, Betty refuses to attend Ignacio's United States citizenship ceremony; she feels guilty about being blackmailed into lying to her boss Daniel Meade (Eric Mabius) about Wilhelmina Slater (Vanessa Williams) who is having an affair with her bodyguard Dwayne (Rick Fox) in order to get Ignacio his visa. Wilhelmina used her connection with her senator father to secure the visa in exchange for Betty's silence. Betty and Henry move in together, and he encourages her to attend her father's ceremony.

Wilhelmina's assistant Marc St. James (Michael Urie) is stressed from planning her wedding to Bradford Meade (Alan Dale), the CEO of Meade Publications. Wilhelmina worries her maid of honor Victoria Beckham is stealing the spotlight, and attempts to undermine her by replacing Victoria's Vera Wang dress with a less appealing garment. Victoria, however, still attracts media attention. Meanwhile, Bradford and his daughter Alexis (Rebecca Romijn) celebrate the return of advertisers to the fashion magazine MODE, after a boycott regarding Alexis's role as its openly transgender co-editor-in-chief. Daniel feels ignored by his father, who has chosen Alexis to be his best man. Christina McKinney (Ashley Jensen), MODE's seamstress, reunites with her husband Stuart (Derek Riddell) after leaving him in Scotland years ago; he reveals he is dying of a rare disease which requires a $100,000 operation.

Daniel suspects Wilhelmina is having an affair with Dwayne, although Betty denies any knowledge of this. Prior to the ceremony, Wilhelmina has Victoria locked in a confessional booth. Following Henry's advice about the importance of family, Betty attends Ignacio's citizenship ceremony; they apologize to each other and Betty reveals how she secured his visa, and he encourages Betty to tell the truth to Daniel and stop the wedding. Betty interrupts the event to talk to Daniel in private, who then fires her for lying to him about Wilhelmina's affair. After Betty leaves the church, Daniel reveals the affair to Bradford, who refuses to believe it. During the pause in the ceremony, MODE's receptionist Amanda Tanen (Becki Newton) sings "Milkshake" while accompanied by an organ. Bradford returns to the altar and collapses, with Wilhelmina and Daniel attempting to resuscitate him. Betty watches these events from a monitor in Times Square.

== Production ==
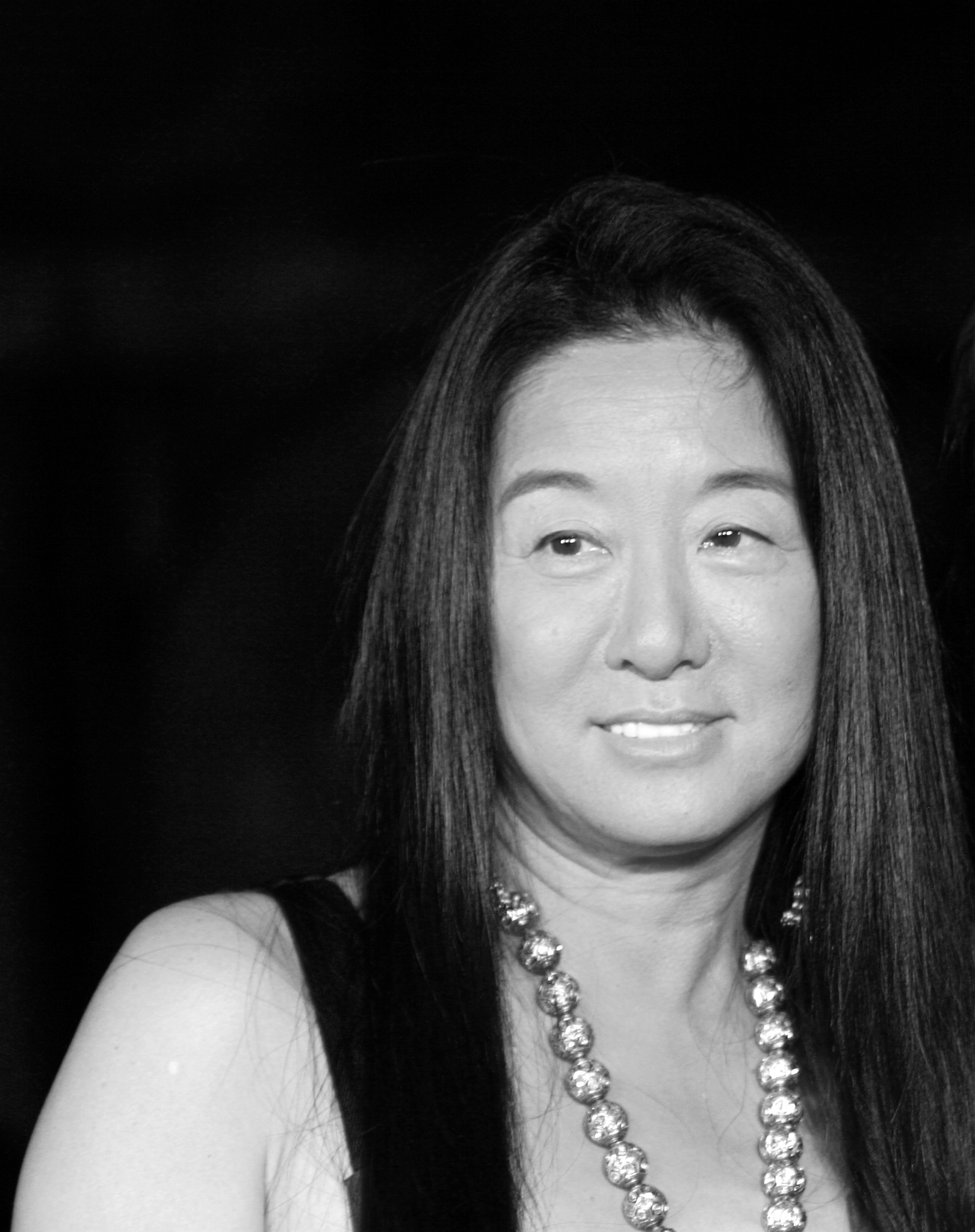
Vera Wang designed the dresses for the episode and appeared as herself.

"A Nice Day for a Posh Wedding" has a runtime of approximately 43 minutes; it was written by Silvio Horta and Marco Pennette, and directed by James Hayman. The episode includes Jeff Buckley's cover of Leonard Cohen's 1984 song "Hallelujah", which is heard during the ending sequence. Along with Becki Newton's rendition of "Milkshake", the wedding scenes include Stevie Wonder and Paul McCartney's 1982 duet "Ebony and Ivory" and Hot Chocolate's 1975 single "You Sexy Thing".

In June 2007, producers requested Victoria Beckham, nicknamed "Posh Spice" during her time as a member of the Spice Girls, to appear as herself in a wedding-theme episode. Eric Mabius had met her during a London awards ceremony; when Beckham said she was a fan of Ugly Betty, Mabius suggested a possible guest appearance. She agreed to appear on the show despite her past reluctance to pursue an acting career. The casting was confirmed the following month by Pennette, who joked that Beckham's husband David would be required to come to the set. She was reportedly paid £70,000 for her appearance. According to The New Zealand Herald, she wanted her cameo to raise her popularity in the United States following her move there earlier in the year.

In the episode's initial storyline, Beckham was to wear a fatsuit for a joke about her weight gain following her move to the U.S. An ABC insider said; "Everyone at the wedding will be expecting skinny, beautiful Posh to show up. But they'll be horrified to see she's piled on the pounds because of major comfort-eating and American junk food." This idea was later abandoned. Prior to the episode's release, photographs of Beckham were leaked online. In 2008, Beckham was rumored to be returning for regular guest appearances in future episodes, although further guest appearances did not materialize.

As well as making a cameo appearance, American fashion designer Vera Wang created the wedding dress. It was made from ivory charmeuse fabric, and included a train and appliqué details on the neckline. Wang had originally created a larger taffeta gown that Vanessa Williams felt was too comedic for the character. Williams said the final design was more "elegant, and suitable for someone Wilhelmina's age". Wang also designed Beckham's bridesmaid's dress. The wedding scenes were filmed over several days at the First Congregational Church of Los Angeles, which was used as a stand-in for a Manhattan cathedral.

Alongside Beckham and Wang, Rick Fox guest-starred as Wilhelmina's bodyguard and lover. Some media outlets asked whether Fox's role was awkward given his divorce from Williams, though they said filming with each other was enjoyable. Fox said he remained friends with Williams while they were co-parenting their daughter.

== Broadcast history and release ==
"A Nice Day for a Posh Wedding" was originally broadcast on November 8, 2007, in the United States on the ABC network. A video preview featuring Beckham's guest appearance was released prior to the episode's debut. Some media outlets promoted the episode as "The Wedding of the Year"; Ferrera, Williams, and Urie were photographed in their costumes for a TV Guide cover. ABC published a fictitious wedding announcement in the "Vows" section of The New York Times.

According to Nielsen, the episode was watched by 10.9 million viewers; it was number one in its time slot for adults between the ages of 18 and 34. The Guardian partially attributed the ratings to Beckham's cameo appearance. "A Nice Day for a Posh Wedding" marked a rise in viewership compared to the previous episode "Something Wicked This Way Comes", which was viewed by 9.9 million people. There was a slight drop in ratings for the following episode "I See Me, I.C.U.", which was seen by 10.7 million viewers. "A Nice Day for a Posh Wedding" was released on DVD as part of the second season release in 2008. The episode was also made available on numerous streaming video on demand services, including Amazon Prime Video, Hulu, Google Play, and Vudu.

== Reception ==
=== Critical response ===
"A Nice Day for a Posh Wedding" received two award nominations. It was up for a Primetime Emmy Award for Outstanding Hairstyling for a Single-Camera Series at the 60th Primetime Emmy Awards, but lost to the Mad Men first-season episode "Shoot". The episode was also nominated for an NAACP Image Award for Outstanding Writing In a Comedy Series at the 39th NAACP Image Awards, although it lost to Everybody Hates Chris for the episode "Everybody Hates Guidance Counselor".

The episode received a largely positive critical response. The A.V. Club's Michaelangelo Matos praised it as one of the best of the season at that point. He described the characters and their respective storylines as well-balanced, writing that "each segment was paced to breathe, and the jokes were aimed perfectly." Denise Ward of the Los Angeles Times commended the episode for "pull[ing] our collective gut in all directions (and we're still deliciously dizzy)", and singled out its use of comedy and drama. In a 2016 Refinery29 article, Erin Donnelly cited Wilhelmina's wedding dress as one of the top 34 most memorable in television history. Entertainment Weekly's Kate Ward wrote that the episode had "all the drama with plenty of pitch-perfect comedy", citing scenes between Marc and his boyfriend Cliff St. Paul as the notable high points. Ward, however, questioned whether the time spent on Ignacio's citizenship ceremony could have been used for other characters, though she found the ending to his immigration storyline to be enjoyable. On the other hand, Amina Akhtar of Vulture dismissed the episode as one of the worst in the show's history; she criticized the script as containing numerous plot holes and the costuming as too tacky given the characters' association with a fashion magazine.

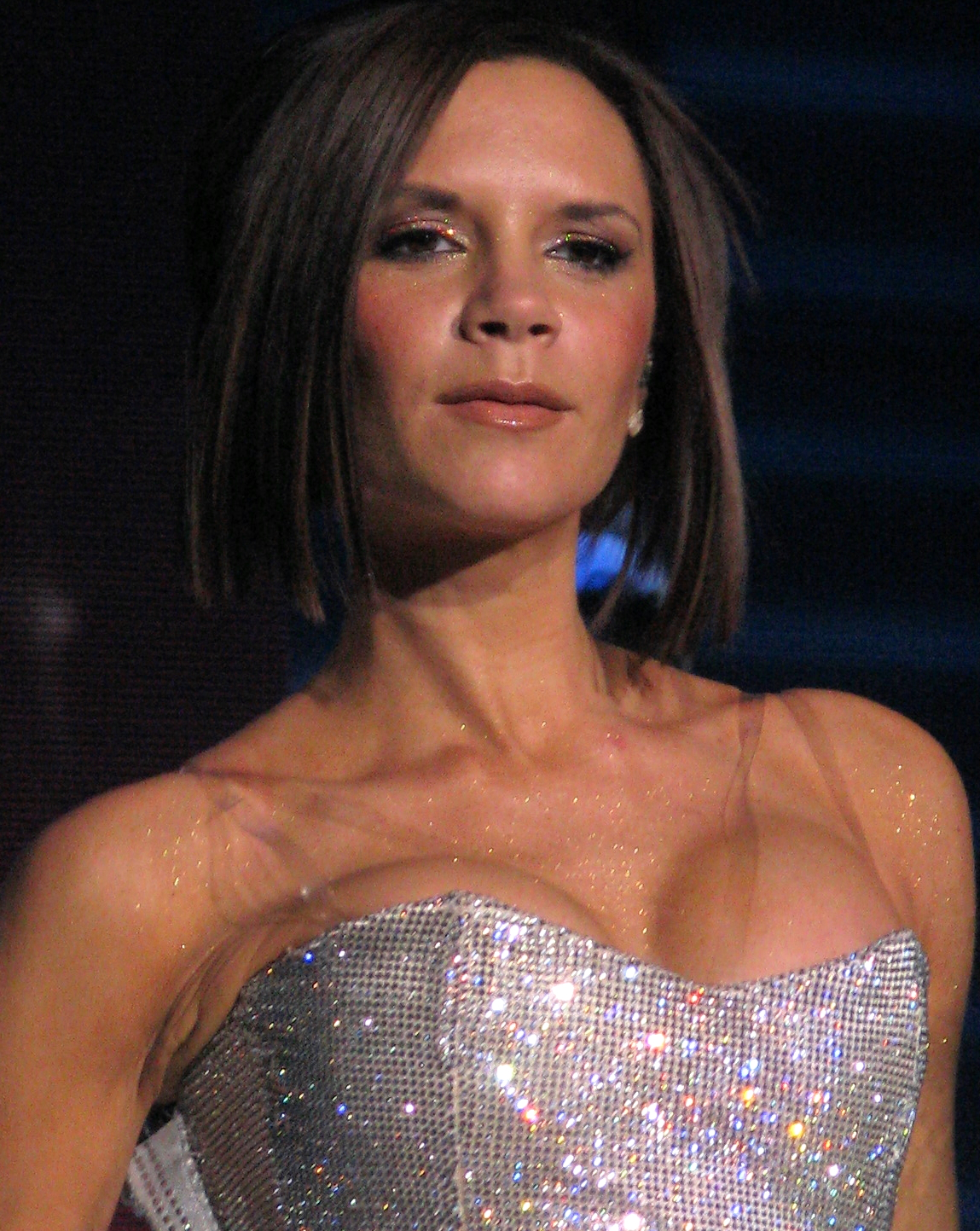
Victoria Beckham's cameo was well received by critics.

Beckham's inclusion was widely praised by television critics. Matos praised the decision to use Beckham as a running gag rather than as a serious character. Dorothy Snarker of AfterEllen.com wrote that Beckham's dynamic with Wilhelmina was "destined to become a classic", but she criticized Beckham's acting. TV Guide's Aimee Deeken singled out Beckham's advertisement for an energy drink during a wedding-related press interview as her favorite part of the episode. The guest role was also praised in retrospective reviews. In a 2008 Entertainment Weekly article, Tanner Stransky cited Beckham as one of the better celebrity appearances in the series. In a 2017 listicle for Digital Spy, Sam Ashurst considered her to be one of the eleven best cameo appearances in television. He described Beckham's role as a caricature of herself that is perfect for the show's story and tone, though he was uncertain about her acting abilities.

Critics had a positive response to Newton's rendition of "Milkshake". Ward preferred it over the original, writing that she "personified train wreck during her church-y rendition", and Matos referred to the performance as risky yet successful. In a 2010 article looking back on Ugly Betty, The Guardian's Kira Cochrane likened its "occasional musical moments", like "Milkshake", to "the best stage spectacles, those filled with wild outfits and wilder songs, which make you laugh with one breath before ripping out your heart with the next". Music journalist Paul Lester wrote that the inclusion of "Milkshake" on Ugly Betty and other television shows were signs of the song's "cultural penetration". On the other hand, the inclusion of "Hallelujah" had a more mixed response. The Chicago Tribune's Geoff Edgers felt its use in the episode, as well as in other television shows, proved its status as a standard. Alternatively, Mato criticized the moment as trite, referring to the song as "the biggest musical-cue cliché of the decade".

=== Racial analysis ===
Ignacio's citizenship ceremony was the subject of some scholarly analysis. According to Chicana/o studies professors Eliza Rodriguez y Gibson and Tanya González, the related scenes juxtapose Betty's and Ignacio's faith in the government. Ignacio gains faith in the United States through citizenship, despite doing it outside the established system, while Betty loses it because she no longer views "the system of citizenship as protection". Betty becomes "reduced and marginalized" as an assistant, and gets fired unfairly in a violation of the "reciprocal protections" promised by the American Dream. According to Rodriguez y Gibson, the episode sends a message that "citizenship does not guarantee against marginalization nor does it offer protection, nor friendship, nor inclusion." Communication studies professors Stacey K. Sowards and Richard D. Pineda criticized the convenience in which Ignacio obtained his citizenship for implying immigration issues could be solved by "knowing the right people or through hard work to pay for a lawyer that can address one's immigration positionality".
