= James R. Rosenthal =

American film producer

- Born: March 1, 1968; Chicago, Illinois, U.S.
- Died: September 17, 2011 (aged 48); Santa Monica, California, U.S.
- Other names: James Rosenthal; Jim Rosenthal
- Years active: 1992–2011

James R. "Jim" Rosenthal (March 1, 1968 – September 17, 2011) was an American film producer and production manager.

== Filmography ==
Year	Title	Credited as	Notes
1992	Deuce Coupe	Intern	Credited as Jim Rosenthal
1994	Jackson Browne: Going Home	Provided documentary footage	Television documentary, credited as Jim Rosenthal
1994	Mirror, Mirror 2: Raven Dance	Post-production supervisor, first assistant editor	
1994	Playmaker	Post-production coordinator	
1994	Dead Badge	post-production supervisor, post-production coordinator	
1995	Girl in the Cadillac	Post-production supervisor	
1995	The Takeover	Post-production supervisor, assistant film editor	
1996	The Elevator	Co-producer	
1996	The Secret Agent Club	Co-producer	
1996	Santa with Muscles	Co-producer	
1996	Prey of the Jaguar	Co-producer	
1996	Assault on Dome 4	Production supervisor	Television movie
1996	Blood Money	Co-producer, production supervisor	Credited as Jim Rosenthal
1997	Firestorm	Production supervisor	
1997	Skeletons	Co-producer	Television movie
1999	The Virgin Suicides	Post-production supervisor	
1999	Kiss Toledo Goodbye	Post-production supervisor	
2000	Primary Suspect	Post-production supervisor	
2000	The Right Temptation	Post-production supervisor	
2000	Sanctimony	Post-production supervisor	Television movie, credited as James Rosenthal
2000	Crash and Byrnes	Production supervisor	Television movie, credited as Jim Rosenthal
2002	I Saw Mommy Kissing Santa Claus	Producer	Credited as James Rosenthal
2003	A Good Night to Die	Co-producer	Credited as James Rosenthal
2003	Deep Freeze	Producer	
2004	Costume Party Capers: The Incredibles	Producer	Television movie
2004	Dead Scared	Co-producer	
2005	Born Killers	Co-producer	
2005	Dante's Cove	Post-production supervisor	Television series, unknown episodes
2006	Long Lost Son	Line producer	
2006	Honeymoon With Mom	Line producer	
2006	Behind the Mask: The Rise of Leslie Vernon	Post-production supervisor	
2006	Coachella	Post-production supervisor	Documentary
2007	Ice Spiders	Line producer	
2007	Echo	Producer	Short
2008	Gingerdead Man 2: Passion of the Crust	Line producer/producer	
2008	White Flag	Co-producer	Short
2009	Little Fish, Strange Pond	Line producer	
2010	Rain from Stars	Line producer	
2010	Calico Diner	Producer	Short
2010	Demonic Toys: Personal Demons	Associate producer, first assistant director	Credited as Jim Rosenthal
2011	Gingerdead Man 3: Saturday Night Cleaver	Line producer	
2011	The Brooklyn Brothers Beat the Best	Line producer	
2011	Fully Loaded	Line producer	
2011	The Connecticut Kid	Producer, Lee Vantage (credited as Jim Rosenthal)	
2012	LUV	Line producer	
2013	Sugar	Line producer, producer	
2013	Scavengers	Line producer	
2013	Rain from Stars	Line producer	
2014	A Fine Step	Line producer	
