= Curse of the Forty-Niner =

- Directed by: John Carl Buechler
- Starring: Karen Black
- Release date: 2002
- Running time: 86 minutes
- Country: United States
- Language: English
- Budget: Unknown

Curse of the Forty-Niner (also known as Miner's Massacre) is a 2002 American slasher film directed by John Carl Buechler and starring Karen Black.

== Plot ==
A group of explorers go hiking in the forests of northern California. They stumble upon an old mine and take a large amount of gold that they find. They do not know that the gold belonged to a miner named Jeremiah Stone (Vernon Wells), who died in the mine. He awakens from the dead and begins killing anyone who gets in the way of his gold.

== Cast ==
- Karen Black - Aunt Nelly
- John Phillip Law - Sheriff Murphy
- Richard Lynch - Old Man Prichard
- Vernon Wells - Jeremiah Stone
- Martin Kove - Caleb (Bertie's Lover)
- Jeff Conaway - Reverend Sutter
- Sean Hines - Nick Berman
- Rick Majeske/Rich Majeske as Hayden (Rox Ann's Boyfriend)
- Stephen Wastell/Steve Wastell as Axl (Tori's Boyfriend)
- Carrie Bradac - Claire Berman
- Kelsey Wedeen as Lilly Sutter
- Alexandra Ford as Eve (Aunt Nelly's niece)
- Sandra Purpuro/Sangie as Tori (Axl's Girlfriend)
- Elina Madison as Rox Ann (Hayden's Girlfriend)
- Skye Myers as Bertie (Caleb's Lover)
