= Scott Thomson (actor) =

American actor (born 1957)

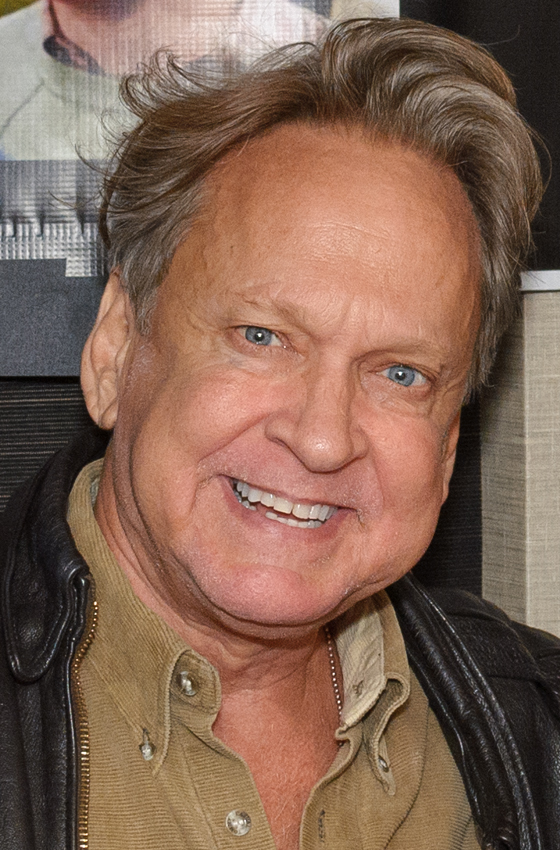
- Scott Thomson at the Chiller Theatre Expo in 2017
- Born: October 29, 1957 (age 68); California, United States
- Occupation: Actor
- Years active: 1977 - present

Scott Thomson (born October 29, 1957) is an American actor. He has appeared in the films Twister (1996), Ghoulies (1985), Fast Times at Ridgemont High (1982) and Police Academy (1984).

== Early life ==
Thomson was born on October 29, 1957. He graduated from Lowell High School in Whittier, California in 1972.

His sister, Carolyn Jean Thomson Casanave. was a musical theater artist who appeared as Carolyn McCurry. She created the role of Raven in the Broadway production of The Robber Bridegroom.

== Career ==
His film appearances include Parasite, Jack Frost, Clockstoppers, and It Runs in the Family.

Thomson played the role of Chad Copeland in the 1984 movie Police Academy (1984), which he reprised in Police Academy 3: Back in Training (1986) and Police Academy 4: Citizens on Patrol (1987). He played Dan Huber in the 2015 film Greater.

== Filmography ==
- The Greatest American Hero (1981) – Young Boy
- Jessica Novak (1981) – Richie
- Parasite (1982) – Chris
- Fast Times at Ridgemont High (1982) – Arnold
- T. J. Hooker (1982) – Deke
- Frightmare (1983) – Bobo
- Police Academy (1984) – Cadet Chad Copeland
- Ghoulies (1985) – Mike
- Johnny Dangerously (1984) – Charley
- Police Academy 3: Back in Training (1986) – Sgt. Chad Copeland
- Police Academy 4: Citizens on Patrol (1987) – Sgt. Chad Copeland
- RoboCop (1987) - Creep #2
- The Couch Trip (1988) – Klevin
- Casual Sex? (1988) – Man #1
- Day One (1989) – Chemist
- Hunter (1989) – Danny McCann
- Star Trek: The Next Generation (1989) – Daimon Goss
- Parker Lewis Can't Lose (1990) – Mr. Kornstein
- Jack the Bear (1993) – Street Worker
- Mr. Jones (1993) – Conrad
- It Runs in the Family (1994) – Delbert Bumpus
- The Cosby Mysteries (1994) – Street Person
- Clueless (1995) – Flower Delivery Guy
- Twister (1996) – Jason "Preacher" Rowe
- Circles (1998) – Dick Halloran
- Jack Frost (1998) – Dennis Father
- Blast from the Past (1999) – Young Psycho
- Loser (2000) – Cell Phone Guy
- Clockstoppers (2002) – Tourist Dad
- Fawlty Tower Oxnard (2007) – The Major
- Big Love (2009) – Tour Guide
- Ghost Whisperer (2009) – Man
- True Blood (2010) – Mr. Rakestraw
- Night of the Living Dead 3D: Re-Animation (2012) – Werner Gottshok
- Vamps (2012) – Erik
- Keep It Together (2014) – Manager del hotel
- Greater (2015) – Dan Huber
