= Primetime Emmy Award for Outstanding Hairstyling for a Single-Camera Series =

Television award category

Primetime Emmy Award for Hairstyling for a Single-Camera Series
- Awarded for: Outstanding Hairstyling for a Single-Camera Series
- Country: United States
- Presented by: Academy of Television Arts & Sciences
- Currently held by: The Marvelous Mrs. Maisel (2019)
- Website: emmys.com

This is a list of winners and nominees of the Primetime Emmy Award for Outstanding Hairstyling for a Single-Camera Series. The category was previously awarded as Outstanding Hairstyling for a Series. In 2008, it splits to honor single-camera series and Outstanding Hairstyling for a Multi-Camera Series or Special.

In the following list, the first titles listed in gold are the winners; those not in gold are nominees, which are listed in alphabetical order. The years given are those in which the ceremonies took place:

== Winners and nominations ==
=== 1970s ===
Outstanding Individual Achievement in Any Area of Creative Technical Crafts

Year	Program	Episode	Nominees	Network
1970
1970	The Don Adams Special: Hooray for Hollywood		Edie Panda	CBS
1974
1974	Benjamin Franklin		Lynda Gurasich	CBS
1974	The Sonny & Cher Comedy Hour		Rena Leuschner	CBS
1975
1975	Benjamin Franklin	"The Ambassador"	Edie Panda	CBS
1975	Little House on the Prairie	"If I Should Wake Before I Die"	Larry Germain	NBC
1976
1976	Eleanor and Franklin		Billie Laughridge, Jean Burt Reilly	ABC
1977
1977	Eleanor and Franklin: The White House Years		Emma di Vittorio, Vivienne Walker	ABC
1977	The Great Houdini		Naomi Cavin	ABC
1977	Little House on the Prairie	"To Live with Fear"	Larry Germain	NBC
1978
1978	The Awakening Land	"Part 3"	Sugar Blymyer	NBC
1978	Little House on the Prairie	"Here Comes the Brides"	Larry Germain, Gladys Witten	NBC

Outstanding Achievement in Hairstyling

Year	Program	Episode	Nominees	Network
1979
1979	The Triangle Factory Fire Scandal		Janice D. Brandow	NBC
1979	Backstairs at the White House	"Book Four"	Susan Germaine, Lola Kemp, Vivian McAteer	NBC
1979	Ike: The War Years	"Part 3"	Jean Burt Reilly	ABC

=== 1980s ===
Year	Program	Episode	Nominees	Network
1980
1980	The Miracle Worker		Larry Germain, Donna Barrett Gilbert	NBC
1980	Fantasy Island	"Dr. Jekyll and Ms. Hyde/Aphrodite"	Joan Phillips	ABC
1980	Haywire		Carolyn Elias, Bette Iverson	CBS
1980	Murder Can Hurt You		Naomi Cavin, Mary Hadley	ABC
1980	The Silent Lovers		Leonard Drake	NBC
1981
1981	Madame X		Shirley Padgett	NBC
1981	Father Damien: The Leper Priest		Janice D. Brandow	NBC
1981	The Jayne Mansfield Story		Silvia Abascal, Janis Clark	CBS
1981	Little House on the Prairie	"To See the Light"	Larry Germain	NBC
1981	Lou Grant	"Stroke"	Jean Austin	CBS
1982
1982	Eleanor, First Lady of the World		Hazel Catmull	CBS
1982	Cagney & Lacey	"Street Scene"	Stephen Robinette	CBS
1982	Fame	"The Strike"	Gloria Montemayor	NBC
1982	Jacqueline Bouvier Kennedy		Emma M. diVittorio, Dione Taylor	ABC
1982	Marco Polo	"Part 4"	Renata Magnanti, Elda Magnanti	NBC
1983
1983	Rosie: The Rosemary Clooney Story		Edie Panda	CBS
1983	The Life and Adventures of Nicholas Nickleby		Mark Nelson	Syndicated
1983	Missing Children: A Mother's Story		Janice D. Brandow	CBS
1983	Wizards and Warriors	"The Rescue"	Sharleen Rassi	CBS
1984
1984	The Mystic Warrior		Dino Ganzino	ABC
1984	The Day After		Dorothea Long, Judy Crown	ABC
1984	Dempsey		Adele Taylor	CBS
1984	George Washington	"Part 1"	Janice D. Brandow, Shirley Crawford, Irene Aparicio, Cathy Engel, Emma M. diVittorio	CBS
1984	Samson and Delilah		Jan Van Uchelen	ABC
1985
1985	The Jesse Owens Story		Robert L. Stevenson	OPT
1985	The Atlanta Child Murders		Janice D. Brandow, Robert L. Stevenson	CBS
1985	The Burning Bed		Stephen Robinette	NBC
1985	Love Lives On		Vivian McAteer	ABC
1985	My Wicked, Wicked Ways: The Legend of Errol Flynn		Adele Taylor	CBS
1985	Robert Kennedy and His Times	"Part 1"	Lynda Gurasich	CBS

Outstanding Hairstyling for a Series

Year	Program	Episode	Nominees	Network
1986
1986	Amazing Stories	"Gather Ye Acorns"	Bunny Parker	NBC
1986	Dynasty	"Masquerade"	Gerald Solomon, Cherie, Linda Leiter Sharp	ABC
1986	Moonlighting	"The Dream Sequence Always Rings Twice"	Judy Crown, Josée Normand	ABC
1987
1987	Moonlighting	"Atomic Shakespeare"	Kathryn Blondell, Josée Normand	ABC
1987	Crime Story	"Top of the World"	Bunny Parker	NBC
1987	Dynasty	"The Ball"	Gerald Solomon, Cherie	ABC
1987	The Facts of Life	"62 Pickup"	JoAnn Stafford-Chaney, Phillip Ackerman	NBC
1987	Max Headroom	"Body Banks"	Janice Alexander	ABC
1988
1988	Designing Women	"I'll Be Seeing You"	Judy Crown, Monique DeSart	CBS
1988	Crime Story	"Moulin Rouge"	Bunny Parker	NBC
1988	Dynasty	"The Fair"	Gerald Solomon, Cherie, Monica Helpman	ABC
1988	Frank's Place	"Dueling Voodoo"	Ora Green	CBS
1988	Star Trek: The Next Generation	"Haven"	Richard Sabre	Syndicated
1989
1989	Quantum Leap	"Double Identity"	Virginia Kearns	NBC
1989	Almost Grown	"If This Diamond Ring Don't Shine"	Susan Schuler-Page, Sharleen Rassi	CBS
1989	Star Trek: The Next Generation	"Unnatural Selection"	Richard Sabre, Georgina Williams	Syndicated
1989	Thirtysomething	"We'll Meet Again"	Carol Pershing	ABC
1989	The Tracey Ullman Show	"The Subway"	Billy Laughridge	Fox

=== 1990s ===
Year	Program	Episode	Nominees	Network
1990
1990	The Tracey Ullman Show	"My Date With Il Duce," "The Thrill Is Gone," "The Wrong Message"	Linle White, Peggy Shannon	Fox
1990	Guns of Paradise	"A Gathering of Guns"	Linda Leiter Sharp	CBS
1990	Murder, She Wrote	"When the Fat Lady Sings"	Ronald W. Smith, Gerald Solomon, Rita Bellissimo, Dino Ganziano, Ann Wadlington	CBS
1990	Star Trek: The Next Generation	"Hollow Pursuits"	Vivian McAteer, Barbara Lampson, Rita Bellissimo	Syndicated
1990	Thirtysomething	"Strangers"	Carol Pershing	ABC
1991
1991	Dark Shadows	"Episode 8"	Dee-Dee Petty, Jan Van Uchelen, Susan Boyd	NBC
1991	Anything but Love	"Long Day's Journey Into... What?"	Joanne Harris, Gus Le Pre, Peggy Shannon	ABC
1992
1992	Homefront	"Man This Joint Is Jumping"	Jerry Gugliemotto, Barbara Ronci	ABC
1992	In Living Color	"310"	Pauletta O. Lewis, Victoria Wood, Pinky Cunningham	Fox
1992	Sessions	"Thursday We Eat Italian"	Lucia Mace	HBO
1992	Star Trek: The Next Generation	"Cost of Living"	Joy Zapata, Patricia Miller	Syndicated
1993
1993	Star Trek: The Next Generation	"Time's Arrow, Part 2"	Joy Zapata, Candace Neal, Patricia Miller, Laura Connolly, Richard Sabre, Julia L. Walker, Josée Normand	Syndicated
1993	Homefront	"Life Is Short"	Jerry Gugliemotto, Georgina Williams	ABC
1993	Murphy Brown	"A Year to Remember"	Judy Crown	CBS
1993	Sisters	"The Cold Light of Day"	Sharleen Rassi, Barry Rosenberg	NBC
1993	Star Trek: Deep Space Nine	"Move Along Home"	Candace Neal, Ronald W. Smith, Gerald Solomon, Susan Zietlow-Maust	Syndicated
1994
1994	Dr. Quinn, Medicine Woman	"Where the Heart Is"	Laura Lee Grubich, Cheri Hufman, Shirley Dolle, Virginia Grobeson, Barbara Minster, Rebecca De Morrio	CBS
1994	Star Trek: Deep Space Nine	"Armageddon Game"	Josée Normand, Ronald W. Smith, Norma Lee, Gerald Solomon	Syndicated
1994	Star Trek: The Next Generation	"Firstborn"	Joy Zapata, Patricia Miller, Laura Connolly, Carolyn Elias, Don Sheldon, Susan Zietlow-Maust	Syndicated
1994	The Young Indiana Jones Chronicles	"Paris, May 1919"	Meinir Jones-Lewis	ABC
1995
1995	Dr. Quinn, Medicine Woman	"A Washington Affair"	Karl Wesson, Kelly Kline, Deborah Holmes Dobson, Virginia Grobeson, Leslie Ann Anderson, Laura Connolly, Caryl Codon-Tharp, Carol Pershing	CBS
1995	Babylon 5	"The Geometry of Shadows"	Tracy Smith	Syndicated
1995	The Nanny	"Stock Tip"	Dugg Kirkpatrick	CBS
1995	Roseanne	"Skeletons in the Closet"	Pixie Schwartz	ABC
1995	Star Trek: Deep Space Nine	"Improbable Cause"	Josée Normand, Norma Lee, Ronald W. Smith, Gerald Solomon, Michael Moore, Chris McBee, Caryl Codon-Tharp, Faith Vecchio, Rebecca De Morrio, Joan Phillips	Syndicated
1995	Star Trek: Voyager	"Caretaker"	Josée Normand, Patricia Miller, Shawn McKay, Karen Asano-Myers, Dino Ganziano, Rebecca De Morrio, Barbara Minster, Janice D. Brandow, Gloria Ponce, Caryl Codon-Tharp, Katherine Rees, Virginia Kearns, Patricia Vecchio, Faith Vecchio, Audrey Levy	UPN
1996
1996	Dr. Quinn, Medicine Woman	"When a Child Is Born"	Karl Wesson, Kelly Kline, Deborah Holmes Dobson, Laura Lee Grubich, Virginia Grobeson, Christine Lee	CBS
1996	Chicago Hope	"Right to Life"	Mary Ann Valdes, Dione Taylor	CBS
1996	Saturday Night Live	"Host: Quentin Tarantino"	David H. Lawrence, Wanda Gregory, Valerie Gladstone-Appel, Linda Rice	NBC
1996	Star Trek: Deep Space Nine	"Our Man Bashir"	Shirley Dolle, Cherie, Lee Crawford, Brian A. Tunstall, Ellen Powell, Susan Zietlow-Maust, Barbara Ronci	Syndicated
1996	Star Trek: Voyager	"Persistence of Vision"	Barbara Minster, Karen Asano-Myers, Laura Connolly, Suzan Bagdadi	UPN
1996	3rd Rock from the Sun	"The Dicks They Are a Changin'"	Pixie Schwartz	NBC
1997
1997	Star Trek: Voyager	"Fair Trade"	Josée Normand, Suzan Bagdadi, Karen Asano-Myers, Monique DeSart, Charlotte Parker, Jo Ann Phillips, Frank Fontaine, Diane Pepper	UPN
1997	Dr. Quinn, Medicine Woman	"Starting Over"	Karl Wesson, Kelly Kline, Deborah Holmes Dobson, Virginia Grobeson, Christine Lee, Leslie Ann Anderson	CBS
1997	Star Trek: Deep Space Nine	"Trials and Tribble-ations"	Norma Lee, Brian A. Tunstall, Jacklin Masteran, Linle White, Francine Shermaine, Caryl Codon-Tharp, Susan Zietlow-Maust, Charlotte Harvey	Syndicated
1997	3rd Rock from the Sun	"A Nightmare on Dick Street"	Pixie Schwartz, Camille Friend	NBC
1997	Tracey Takes On...	"Childhood"	Audrey Futterman-Stern	HBO
1998
1998	Tracey Takes On...	"Smoking"	Audrey Futterman-Stern	HBO
1998	Buffy the Vampire Slayer	"Becoming"	Jeri Baker, Francine Shermaine, Suzan Bagdadi, Susan Carol Schwary, Dugg Kirkpatrick	The WB
1998	Dr. Quinn, Medicine Woman	"A New Beginning"	Deborah Holmes Dobson, Virginia Grobeson, Laura Lee Grubich, Christine Lee, Elaina P. Schulman, Jennifer Guerrero-Mazursky, Kelly Kline	CBS
1998	Star Trek: Deep Space Nine	"Far Beyond the Stars"	Norma Lee, Brian A. Tunstall, Rebecca De Morrio, Darlis Chefalo, Gloria Pasqua Casny, Kathrine Gordon, Hazel Catmull, Ruby Ford, Louisa V. Anthony, Barbara Ronci, Suzan Bagdadi, JoAnn Stafford-Chaney	Syndicated
1998	Star Trek: Voyager	"The Killing Game"	Josée Normand, Charlotte Parker, Viviane Normand, Gloria Montemayor, Chris McBee, Mimi Jafari, Ruby Ford, Delree F. Todd, Laura Connolly, Hazel Catmull, Diane Pepper, Adele Taylor, Barbara Ronci, Lola 'Skip' McNalley	UPN
1999
1999	Tracey Takes On...	"Hair"	Audrey Futterman-Stern	HBO
1999	MADtv	"402"	Matthew Kasten	Fox
1999	Saturday Night Live	"Host: Gwyneth Paltrow"	Bobby H. Grayson	NBC
1999	Star Trek: Deep Space Nine	"Badda-Bing Badda-Bang"	Norma Lee, Brian A. Tunstall, Gloria Pasqua Casny, Rebecca De Morrio, Laura Connolly, Lauran Upshaw, Frank Fontaine, Tim Jones, Susan Zietlow-Maust, Angela Gurule, Gloria Ponce, Virginia Grobeson, Linda Leiter Sharp	Syndicated
1999	That '70s Show	"Prom Night"	Gabriella Pollino, Cindy Costello, Valerie Scott, Deborah Ann Piper	Fox

=== 2000s ===
Year	Program	Episode	Nominees	Network
2000
2000	Saturday Night Live	"Host: Alan Cumming"	Bobby H. Grayson	NBC
2000	Buffy the Vampire Slayer	"Beer Bad"	Sean Flanigan, Lisa Marie Rosenberg, Gloria Pasqua Casny, Loretta Jody Miller	The WB
2000	MADtv	"Movie Show"	Dugg Kirkpatrick, Judith Tiedemann, Christine Curry, Virginia Grobeson, Danny Goldstein, Bryn E. Leetch, Matthew Kasten, Kenneth Michael Beck	Fox
2000	The Sopranos	"Full Leather Jacket"	Mel McKinney, William A. Kohout	HBO
2000	Star Trek: Voyager	"Dragon's Teeth"	Josée Normand, Charlotte Parker, Gloria Montemayor, Viviane Normand, Jo Ann Phillips	UPN
2000	That '70s Show	"Vanstock"	Gabriella Pollino, Cindy Costello, Valerie Scott	Fox
2001
2001	MADtv	"601"	Matthew Kasten, Mishell Chandler, Desmond Miller, Rod Ortega, Mimi Jafari, Fabrizio Sanges	Fox
2001	The Lot	"Daddy Dearest"	Cheri Ruff, Carl Bailey, Stephen Elsbree	AMC
2001	Sex and the City	"All or Nothing"	Michelle Johnson, Jacques Stephane Lempire, Sacha Quarles	HBO
2001	Star Trek: Voyager	"Prophecy"	Josée Normand, Charlotte Parker, Gloria Montemayor	UPN
2001	That '70s Show	"Backstage Pass"	Gabriella Pollino, Cindy Costello, Terrie Velazquez Owen	Fox
2002
2002	Star Trek: Enterprise	"Two Days and Two Nights"	Michael Moore, Gloria Pasqua Casny, Roma Goddard, Laura Connolly, Cheri Ruff	UPN
2002	Alias	"Q&A"	Michael Reitz, Karen Bartek	ABC
2002	Buffy the Vampire Slayer	"Hell's Bells"	Sean Flanigan, Lisa Marie Rosenberg, Francine Shermaine, Thomas Real, Linda Arnold	UPN
2002	Sex and the City	"Ghost Town"	Michelle Johnson, Angel De Angelis, Sacha Quarles, Suzana Neziri	HBO
2002	Six Feet Under	"I'll Take You"	Randy Sayer, Kimberley Spiteri, Pinky Babajian	HBO
2003
2003	American Dreams	"I Want to Hold Your Hand"	Cheri Ruff, Soo-Jin Yoon, Paulette Pennington	NBC
2003	Alias	"The Counteragent"	Michael Reitz, Karen Bartek	ABC
2003	MADtv	"805"	Matthew Kasten, Mishell Chandler, K. Troy Zestos, Stacey Bergman	Fox
2003	Sex and the City	"Plus One Is the Loneliest Number"	Wayne Herndon, Mandy Lyons, Suzana Neziri, Donna Marie Fischetto	HBO
2003	Six Feet Under	"Perfect Circles"	Randy Sayer, Dennis Parker, Pinky Babajian	HBO
2004
2004	Carnivàle	"After the Ball Is Over"	Kerry Mendenhall, Louisa V. Anthony, Elizabeth Rabe	HBO
2004	Alias	"Unveiled"	Michael Reitz, Karen Bartek, Grace Hernandez, Julie M. Woods	ABC
2004	Deadwood	"Plague"	Josée Normand, Peter Tothpal, Susan Carol Schwary, Ellen Powell	HBO
2004	MADtv	"MADtv's 200th Episode"	Matthew Kasten, Mishell Chandler, Anthea Grutsis, Desmond Miller	Fox
2004	Saturday Night Live	"Hosts: Jessica Simpson & Nick Lachey"	Clariss Morgan, Michaelanthony, Linda Rice	NBC
2005
2005	Deadwood	"Boy the Earth Talks To"	Carol Pershing, Terry Baliel, Kimberley Spiteri	HBO
2005	Alias	"Nocturne"	Michael Reitz	ABC
2005	American Dreams	"Starting Over"	Mary Ann Valdes, Norma Lee, Paulette Pennington, Cathrine A. Marcotte	NBC
2005	Carnivàle	"Outside New Canaan"	Norma Lee, Nanci Cascio, Violet Ortiz	HBO
2005	MADtv	"1017"	Matthew Kasten, Anthea Grutsis, Desmond Miller, Raissa Patton	Fox
2005	Star Trek: Enterprise	"In a Mirror, Darkly"	Norma Lee, Nanci Cascio, Violet Ortiz	UPN
2006
2006	Rome	"Stealing from Saturn"	Aldo Signoretti, Ferdinando Merolla, Stefano Ceccarelli, Gaetano Panico	HBO
2006	Alias	"There's Only One Sydney Bristow"	Michael Reitz, Katherine Rees, Shimmy Osman	ABC
2006	Desperate Housewives	"Remember"	Gabor Heiligenberg, Dena Green, James Dunham, Nicole DeFrancesco	ABC
2006	Six Feet Under	"Everyone's Waiting"	Randy Sayer, Miia Kovero, Karl Wesson, Daphne Lawson	HBO
2006	Will & Grace	"The Finale"	Luke O'Connor, Tim Burke	NBC
2007
2007	Rome	"De Patre Vostro (About Your Father)"	Aldo Signoretti, Stefano Ceccarelli, Claudia Catini, Michele Vigliotta	HBO
2007	Dancing with the Stars	"303"	Mary Guerrero, Lucia Mace, Cynthia P. Romo	ABC
2007	Deadwood	"A Constant Throb"	Gabor Heiligenberg, Dena Green, James Dunham, Maria Fernandez DiSarro	HBO
2007	Desperate Housewives	"It Takes Two"	Gabor Heiligenberg, Dena Green, James Dunham, Maria Fernandez DiSarro	ABC
2007	Ugly Betty	"I'm Coming Out"	Mary Ann Valdes, Lynda Kyle Walker, Norma Lee	ABC

Outstanding Hairstyling for a Single-Camera Series

Year	Program	Episode	Nominees	Network
2008	Mad Men	"Shoot"	Gloria Ponce, Katherine Rees, Marilyn Phillips, Michele Payne	AMC
2008	Desperate Housewives	"In Buddy's Eyes"	Gabor Heiligenberg, Dena Green, James Dunham, Maria Fernandez DiSarro	ABC
2008	Dirty Sexy Money	"The Bridge"	Dennis Parker, Polly Lucke, Kay Majerus, Anna Maria Orzano	ABC
2008	Pushing Daisies	"Smell of Success"	Daniel Curet, Yuko T. Koach	ABC
2008	Tracey Ullman's State of the Union	"104"	Martin Samuel	Showtime
2008	Ugly Betty	"A Nice Day for a Posh Wedding"	Mary Ann Valdes, Lynda Kyle Walker, Norma Lee, Kim Messina	ABC
2009	Mad Men	"The Gold Violin"	Gloria Ponce, Katherine Rees, Marilyn Phillips, Michele Payne	AMC
2009	Desperate Housewives	"The Best Thing That Ever Could Have Happened"	Gabor Heiligenberg, Dena Green, James Dunham, Maria Fernandez DiSarro	ABC
2009	Pushing Daisies	"Dim Sum Lose Some"	Daniel Curet, Yuko T. Koach, Gloria Conrad, Elizabeth Rabe	ABC
2009	Tracey Ullman's State of the Union	"202"	Martin Samuel, Colleen LaBaff	Showtime
2009	The Tudors	"Protestant Anne of Cleves"	Dee Corcoran	Showtime

=== 2010s ===
Year	Program	Episode	Nominees	Network
2010	Mad Men	"Souvenir"	Lucia Mace, Anthony Wilson, Mary Guerrero, Peggy Semtob	AMC
2010	Castle	"Vampire Weekend"	Toni-Ann Walker, Yuko T. Koach, Lillie S. Frierson	ABC
2010	Glee	"Hairography"	Lynda Kyle Walker, Ann Marie Luddy, Michael S. Ward, Gina Bonacquisti	Fox
2010	Glee	"The Power of Madonna"	Stacey K. Black, Mary Gail Stultz, Roxanne N. Sutphen, Gina Bonacquisti	Fox
2010	Tracey Ullman's State of the Union	"301"	Martin Samuel, Colleen LaBaff	Showtime
2010	The Tudors	"Sixth and the Final Wife"	Dee Corcoran	Showtime
2011	Mad Men	"Christmas Comes But Once a Year"	Sean Flanigan, Gloria Pasqua Casny, Lucia Mace, Theraesa Rivers, Jules Holdren	AMC
2011	Boardwalk Empire	"Boardwalk Empire"	Michael Kriston, Jerry DeCarlo	HBO
2011	Game of Thrones	"A Golden Crown"	Kevin Alexander, Candice Banks, Rosalia Culora, Gary Machin	HBO
2011	Glee	"The Sue Sylvester Shuffle"	Janis Clark, Sterfon Demings, Monte Haught, Susan Zietlow-Maust, Stacey K. Black	Fox
2011	Mad Men	"Hands and Knees"	Lucia Mace, Theraesa Rivers, Terrie Velazquez Owen	AMC
2012	Downton Abbey	"Episode One"	Anne Oldham, Christine Greenwood	PBS
2012	Boardwalk Empire	"Two Boats and a Lifeguard"	Francesca Paris, Christine Cantrell	HBO
2012	The Borgias	"The Confession"	Stefano Ceccarelli, Tahira Herold, Claudia Catini, Sevlene Roddy	Showtime
2012	Game of Thrones	"The Old Gods and the New"	Kevin Alexander, Candice Banks, Rosalia Culora, Gary Machin	HBO
2012	Mad Men	"The Phantom"	Theraesa Rivers, Lucia Mace, Arturo Rojas, Maria Sandoval, David Blair	AMC
2013	Boardwalk Empire	"Resolution"	Francesca Paris, Lisa DelleChiaie, Sarah Stamp	HBO
2013	The Borgias	"The Wolf and the Lamb"	Stefano Ceccarelli, Claudia Catini, Sevlene Roddy, Judit Halász	Showtime
2013	Downton Abbey	"Episode Four"	Magi Vaughan, Vanya Pell	PBS
2013	Game of Thrones	"Second Sons"	Kevin Alexander, Candice Banks, Rosalia Culora, Gary Machin, Dana Kalder	HBO
2013	Mad Men	"The Doorway"	Theraesa Rivers, Arturo Rojas, David Blair, Jules Holdren	AMC
2014	Downton Abbey	"Episode Eight"	Magi Vaughan, Adam James Phillips	PBS
2014	Boardwalk Empire	"William Wilson"	Francesca Paris, Lisa DelleChiaie, Therese Ducey	HBO
2014	Game of Thrones	"The Lion and the Rose"	Kevin Alexander, Candice Banks, Rosalia Culora, Gary Machin, Nicola Mount	HBO
2014	Mad Men	"The Runaways"	Theraesa Rivers, Arturo Rojas, Valerie Jackson, Ai Nakata	AMC
2014	The Originals	"Dance Back from the Grave"	Colleen LaBaff, Kimberley Spiteri	The CW
2015	Downton Abbey	"Episode Six"	Nic Collins	PBS
2015	Boardwalk Empire	"Eldorado"	Francesca Paris, Lisa DelleChiaie, Sarah Stamp	HBO
2015	Game of Thrones	"Mother's Mercy"	Kevin Alexander, Candice Banks, Rosalia Culora, Gary Machin, Laura Pollock, Nicola Mount	HBO
2015	The Knick	"Get the Rope"	Jerry DeCarlo, Rose Chatterton, Suzy Mazzarese-Allison, Victor DeNicola, Christine Cantrell	Cinemax
2015	Mad Men	"Person to Person"	Theraesa Rivers, Arturo Rojas, Valerie Jackson, Ai Nakata	AMC
2016	Downton Abbey	"Episode Nine"	Nic Collins, Adele Firth	PBS
2016	Game of Thrones	"The Door"	Kevin Alexander, Candice Banks, Nicola Mount, Laura Pollock, Gary Machin, Rosalia Culora	HBO
2016	The Knick	"Williams and Walker"	Jerry DeCarlo, John 'Jack' Curtin, Nathan Busch, Karen Dickenson, Suzy Mazzarese Allison	Cinemax
2016	Masters of Sex	"Matters of Gravity"	Mary Ann Valdes, Matthew Holman, George Guzman	Showtime
2016	Penny Dreadful	"Glorious Horrors"	Ferdinando Merolla, Sevlene Roddy, Giuliano Mariano, Orla Carroll	Showtime
2017	Westworld	"Contrapasso"	Joy Zapata, Pavy Olivarez, Bruce Samia, Donna Anderson	HBO
2017	The Crown	"Hyde Park Corner"	Ivana Primorac, Amy Riley	Netflix
2017	Penny Dreadful	"Ebb Tide"	Ferdinando Merolla, Sevlene Roddy, Giuliano Mariano, Orla Carroll	Showtime
2017	Stranger Things	"Chapter Two: The Weirdo on Maple Street"	Sarah Hindsgaul, Evelyn Roach	Netflix
2017	Vikings	"Revenge"	Dee Corcoran, Catherine Argue, Jenny Readman, Ida Erickson, Zuelika Delaney	History
2018
2018	Westworld	"Akane No Mai"	Joy Zapata, Lori McCoy Bell, Dawn Victoria Dudley, Karen Zanki, Connie Kallos, Norma Lee	HBO
2018	The Crown	"Dear Mrs. Kennedy"	Ivana Primorac	Netflix
2018	Game of Thrones	"The Dragon and the Wolf"	Kevin Alexander, Candice Banks, Nicola Mount, Rosalia Culora	HBO
2018	GLOW	"Pilot"	Theraesa Rivers, Valerie Jackson, Leslie Bennett, Jules Holdren	Netflix
2018	The Marvelous Mrs. Maisel	"Pilot"	Francesca Paris, Christine Cantrell, Cassie Hurd, Reo Anderson	Amazon
2019
2019	The Marvelous Mrs. Maisel	"We're Going to the Catskills!"	Jerry DeCarlo, Jon Jordan, Peg Schierholz, Christine Cantrell, Sabana Majeed	Amazon
2019	American Horror Story: Apocalypse	"Forbidden Fruit"	Michelle Ceglia, Helena Cepeda, Lydia Fantani, Romaine Markus-Meyers	FX
2019	Game of Thrones	"The Long Night"	Kevin Alexander, Candice Banks, Nicola Mount, Rosalia Culora	HBO
2019	GLOW	"The Good Twin"	Theraesa Rivers, Valerie Jackson, Mishell Chandler, Deborah Pierce, Loretta Nero, Jason Green	Netflix
2019	Pose	"Pilot"	Chris Clark, Barry Lee Moe, Jameson Eaton, Mia Neal, Tim Harvey, Sabana Majeed	FX

== Programs with multiple awards ==
4 awards

- Downton Abbey
- Mad Men

3 awards

- Dr. Quinn, Medicine Woman

2 awards

- Rome
- Tracey Takes On...
- Westworld

== Programs with multiple nominations ==
9 nominations

- Mad Men

8 nominations

- Game of Thrones

7 nominations

- Star Trek: Deep Space Nine

6 nominations

- Star Trek: The Next Generation
- Star Trek: Voyager

5 nominations

- Alias
- Boardwalk Empire
- Downton Abbey
- Dr. Quinn, Medicine Woman

4 nominations

- Desperate Housewives
- Little House on the Prairie

3 nominations

- Buffy the Vampire Slayer
- Deadwood
- Dynasty
- Glee
- Sex and the City
- Six Feet Under
- Tracey Ullman's State of the Union

2 nominations

- American Dreams
- The Borgias
- Carnivàle
- Crime Story
- The Crown
- GLOW
- Homefront
- The Knick
- The Marvelous Mrs. Maisel
- Moonlighting
- Penny Dreadful
- Pushing Daisies
- Rome
- Star Trek: Enterprise
- Thirtysomething
- The Tudors
- Ugly Betty
- Westworld
