= The Strange Case of Dr. Jekyll and Mr. Hyde (2006 film) =

- Directed by: John Carl Buechler
- Written by: John Carl Buechler
- Based on: Strange Case of Dr. Jekyll and Mr. Hyde; 1886 novella by Robert Louis Stevenson
- Produced by: Peter B Davy; Rick Nicolet
- Starring: Tony Todd; Tracy Scoggins; Vernon Wells; Deborah Shelton; Stephen Wastell
- Cinematography: James M. LeGoy
- Edited by: Norman Apstein
- Music by: Andy Garfield
- Distributed by: Rocky Mountain Pictures
- Release date: February 1, 2006
- Running time: 100 minutes
- Country: United States
- Language: English
- Budget: US$750,000 (estimated)

The Strange Case of Dr. Jekyll and Mr. Hyde is a 2006 horror film, and an adaptation of Robert Louis Stevenson's 1886 novella. It was directed by John Carl Buechler, and produced by Peter Davy, British American film producer. The film is set in modern times instead of Victorian England.

== Plot ==
Dr. Henry Jekyll has succeeded in curing a higher primate of his serious heart condition. He tests the serum on himself, resulting in dire consequences; he is transformed into the evil Edward Hyde. Dr. Jekyll does not realize that Hyde is a manifestation of himself, and develops a kind of multiple personality disorder. Hyde murders female college students and frames Jekyll. Jekyll feels guilty about the murders, and gives the victims' families $30,000 in damages. Hyde rapes and murders Jekyll's boss, Donna Carew.

During a dinner party, Jekyll's friend Dennis Lanyon sees his colleague transform into Hyde before his eyes. Detective Karen Utterson and Lanyon race to find Jekyll before it's too late, as the serum gives Hyde immortality. Jekyll tries giving himself up to the police, but Hyde won't allow him to go to prison, knowing he will be executed: If Jekyll dies, so does Hyde.

Jekyll commits suicide by jumping off the roof of the hospital, in order to make sure that Hyde will never hurt anyone ever again. As Jekyll dies, he says "It was for my soul."

== Cast ==
- Tony Todd as Dr. Henry Jekyll / Edward Hyde
- Tracy Scoggins as Karen Utterson
- Vernon Wells as Dr. Dennis Lanyon
- Rebecca Grant as Linda Santiago
- Judith Shekoni as Renée
- Danielle Nicolet as Whitney Weddings
- Arloa Reston as Gloria Hatten
- Stefanie Budiman as Whitney's body double
- John Paul Fedele as Alan Ballard
- Paula Ficara as Dominio Hunter
- Peter Jason as Lt. Hamilton
- Marie Louise Jones as Valet
- Howard Kahen as Perkins
- Tyler Kain as Colleen Woodbe
- Miranda Kwok as Stacy Li
- Michelle Lee as Kim Li
- Justin Levin as Jesse
- Peter Lupus III as Gerald Poole
- Elina Madison as Cindy shivers
- Clayton Martinez as Arnold
- Mike Muscat as Night Watchman
- Grant Reynolds as Security Guard
- Deborah Shelton as Donna Carew
- Jacob Tawney as Kelsey James
- Tim Thomerson as Arnie Swift
- Nicholle Tom as Carla Hodgkiss
- Stephen Wastell as Richard Enfield
- Chris Kerner as Paramedic (uncredited)
- Ben Solenberger as Student at Opera House Restaurant (uncredited)

== Release ==
The film was released on DVD by Image Entertainment on May 20, 2008.

== Reception ==
Critical reception for the film has been negative. Jon Condit from Dread Central awarded the film a score of 2.5 out of 5 stating, "While this latest variation of the Jekyll story isn't likely to win over any enthusiasts of the book, it will probably satisfy the undiscerning fan looking for some blood and a few unintentional laughs". DVD Verdict gave the film a negative review criticizing the film's lack of atmosphere, pacing and the film's ending.
