= Satellite Award for Best DVD Release of TV Shows =

Retired annual media award

The Satellite Award for Best DVD Release of TV Shows was an award given by the International Press Academy from 2004 to 2009.

== Winners and nominees ==
Year	Winners and nominees	
2004	Alias	For The Complete Second Season.
2004	24	For The Complete Second Season.
2004	Dawson's Creek	For The Complete Second Season.
2004	Family Guy	For Volume 2.
2004	Mr. Show with Bob and David	For The Complete Third Season.
2004	Star Trek: Deep Space Nine	For Season 7.
2005	Seinfeld	
2005	24	For season 3.
2005	Alias	For season 3.
2005	Angel	For season 4.
2005	Buffy the Vampire Slayer	For season 6.
2005	Felicity	For edition III.
2005	Frasier	For the final season.
2005	Sex and the City	For edition 6.
2005	Taxi	For the Complete First Season.
2005	Terrahawks	
2006	24	For Season Four.
2006	Curb Your Enthusiasm	Complete Fourth Season.
2006	Deadwood	Complete First Season.
2006	Desperate Housewives	Complete First Season.
2006	Entourage	Complete First Season.
2006	House M.D.	For Season One.
2006	The L Word	Complete Second Season.
2006	Lost	Complete First Season.
2006	Rescue Me	Complete First Season.
2006	Seinfeld	For Season 6.
2006	The Simpsons	Complete Seventh Season (Collectible Marge Head Pack).
2006	South Park	Complete Sixth Season.
2007	The Simpsons	For "The Complete Eighth Season".
2007	Alias	For "The Complete Fifth Season".
2007	Desperate Housewives	For "The Complete Second Season".
2007	Mission: Impossible	For "The Complete First Season".
2007	Police Squad!	For "The Complete Series".
2007	Six Feet Under	For "The Complete Series Gift Set".
2007	Slings & Arrows	For "Season Two".
2007	Liza with a Z	For "Collector's Edition".
2008	Dexter	For season 1.
2008	The House of Eliott	For the 'Complete Collection'.
2008	Lost	For the complete third season.
2008	The Muppet Show	For season 2.
2008	Nip/Tuck	For season 4.
2008	The Office	For season 3.
2008	Rome	For season 2.
2008	Twin Peaks	For season 2.
2008	Ugly Betty	For season 1.
2008	Daniel Deronda	
2009	30 Rock	For season 2.
2009	The Tudors	The Complete First Season.
