= Something Wicked This Way Comes (Ugly Betty) =

- Ugly Betty episode
- Episode no.: Season 2 Episode 6
- Directed by: Wendey Stanzler
- Written by: Henry Alonzo Myers
- Editing by: Shawn Paper
- Production code: 206
- Original air date: November 1, 2007

Episode chronology
← Previous "A League of Their Own"	Next → "A Nice Day for a Posh Wedding"
- Ugly Betty season 2

"Something Wicked This Way Comes" is the sixth episode in season two of the dramedy series Ugly Betty, and the 29th episode in the series, which aired on November 1, 2007. The episode was written by Henry Alonso Myers and directed by Wendey Stanzler. The episode takes its title from the phrase "something wicked this way comes", as well as the fact that this episode features the popular Broadway musical Wicked as a date venue.

== Plot ==
Daniel tries to find advertiser support after Bradford favours Alexis to pull in money for Mode, while Betty's friends and family try to distract her from being "lonely" over Henry. However, Henry and Betty have plans to see Wicked, but Daniel is still in the dark over their reunification so Betty is forced to pretend she is attending with annoying sandwich-maker, Gio. Meanwhile, Wilhelmina is still fretting about her upcoming wedding, attempting to gain weight to fit into her dress.

== Production ==
Scenes from the episode were filmed on location at the Pantages Theatre with the Los Angeles production company of the hit musical Wicked, which was a stand-in for the Broadway production. In this production, Megan Hilty and original Broadway standby Eden Espinosa played Glinda and Elphaba respectively. In a July 29, 2007 interview with Playbill, producer Marco Pennette said: "I love theatre actors," says Pennette. "I grew up back east (he was born in Greenwich, Connecticut), and I'm a big lover of theatre. I want to go into theatre; TV sort of lured me away..."

== Reception ==
There were some mixed reviews over this episode because of the "plug" for "Wicked." In a recap from Entertainment Weekly, reviewer Kate Ward described it as, "If after last night's episode, you didn't stand up, walk to your computer and log onto Ticketmaster while chanting, Must...see...Wicked, well, then consider yourself immune to all influences. Because if Ugly Betty wasn't just one giant commercial for the Broadway show, I don't know what was."

== Ratings ==
The episode was watched by 9.9 million viewers in the US and had a 7.3 rating, according to ABC.

== Also starring ==
- Freddy Rodriguez as Giovanni "Gio" Rossi
- David Blue as Cliff St. Paul
- Bailey Chase as Beckett "Becks" Scott
- Juliette Goglia as Hilary

== Guest stars ==
- Eden Espinosa as Elphaba
- Megan Hilty as Glinda
- Marlo Thomas as Sandra Winthrop
- Jasmine Anthony as Antonella Rossi
- Kristoffer Cusick as Fiyero
- Casey Margolis as Duncan
