= Gingerdead Man 2: Passion of the Crust =

- DVD artwork
- Directed by: Silvia St. Croix
- Written by: Muffy Bolding; William Butler; Aaron Strongoni
- Produced by: James R. Rosenthal; Charles Band; Gregory Paul Smith
- Starring: John Vulich; K-von Moezzi; Kelsey Sanders; Joseph Porter; Frank Nicotero; Jon Southwell; Bruce Dent; Emily Button; Parker Young; Michelle Bauer; Johnnie Oberg Jr. Kenneth J. Hall; Chi Chi Garcia; Bryce Wagoner; Travis Dixon; Junie Hoang; Nic Haas; Nicole Shilperoort; Jacob Witkin
- Cinematography: Viorel Sergovici
- Distributed by: Full Moon Entertainment
- Release date: July 4, 2008
- Running time: 72 minutes
- Country: United States
- Language: English

Gingerdead Man 2: Passion of the Crust is a 2008 American comedy slasher film written and directed by Silvia St. Croix. The film is a sequel to the 2005 film The Gingerdead Man. The distributor of the film is Full Moon Entertainment. The film was originally titled Gingerdead Man 2: Bakery of Blood.

== Plot ==
Kelvin Cheatum is trying to save his father's studio from bankruptcy by producing worthy heirs to his father's slate of classic low-budget cult films. Cheatum Studio's current productions include Hamburger Time Traveler Detective and the ninth entry of his father's famous killer puppet franchise. A blogger who goes by the name of "Demon Warrior 13" is organizing effective boycotts of their films.

A puppet exploding during a shot has brought matters to a head and an open brawl has broken out on the set. Tommy Hines arrives from The End of the Rainbow Last Wish Foundation with his caseworker Heather Crocker. His final wish before he dies is to tour the studio and see the star puppets from the Tiny Terrors franchise.

Polly Bonderhoof attempts to restore order with a box of baked goods from her sister in Waco, Texas, which includes the Gingerdead Man. He slips out of the pastry box and locates a spellbook in the prop room, which includes a transmigration spell to transfer his soul out of his stale form and into a human body. The spell calls for blood from five victims placed in a pentagram, and then the sacrifice of one more victim, who must be a virgin.

The Gingerdead Man kills four people in various gruesome ways, but is driven off by Kelvin and Heather as he cuts the handoff of a crew member. Kelvin orders the studio evacuated and sets off with Heather to confront the cookie and find Tommy, which goes badly when the Gingerdead Man seizes control of a prop robot with functioning lasers and disintegrates Jake. Tommy cuts the robot's power cord with an ax and it topples over. Tommy reveals himself to be "Demon Warrior 13," who has faked his illness in order to gain access to the studio and blow it up as revenge for the studio non-responsiveness to the scripts he has submitted. Kelvin offers a three-picture deal while Heather sneaks up behind Tommy and attempts to bludgeon him. The assault fails and Kelvin is knocked unconscious.

Kelvin wakes on an altar on the Tiny Terrors set. Tommy is reading an incantation from the spellbook, but the Gingerdead Man fatally stabs Tommy from behind. The Gingerdead Man changes his plan, and decides to use Kelvin's body as his new host. It is revealed that the Gingerdead Man has made a mistake. The dolls from the set of Tiny Terrors animate themselves, and then attack the Gingerdead Man. They hold him down while one of them gets a cross and crucify him before burning him on the cross. One of the actors from the movie bursts in and shoots all of the puppets with an AK-47.

It is shown that Kelvin has married Heather and Tiny Terrors has won an award for Best Horror Hand Puppet Motion Picture, while a homeless man comes across the burnt cookie. He takes a bite and becomes possessed by the Gingerdead Man.

== Cast ==
The film's credits give a number of characters last names that are not mentioned in the film itself. Several of these are references to major food companies (specifically ones that produce snack cakes and goods) or puns such as “Crocker, Hines/Heinz, Entemann, Nestle, Pillsbury” and “Cinabonus”. There are also a number of jokes within the credits themselves such as listing Edgar Allan Poe as “Scary Writer Dude”, John Vulich simply as “Himself” instead of “Gingerdead Man”, and Stephanie Denton as “Still owes Silvia twenty bucks”.

- John Vulich as “Himself“ (The Gingerdead Man)
- K-von Moezzi as Kelvin Cheatum, failing producer and heir to Cheatum Studios.
- Kelsey Sanders as Heather Crocker, an employee for End of the Rainbow Last Wish Foundation.
- Joseph Porter as Tommy Hines, supposedly a boy with terminal illness wishing to gain access to Cheatum Studios.
- Frank Nicotero as Marty Dradel-Brillstein-Schwartz, Cheatum Studios Operations Manager.
- Jon Southwell as Jake Jackson, Stuntman.
- Jacob Witkin as Sir Ian Cavanaugh, a distinguished actor who's been duped into starring in Tiny Terrors 9.
- Michelle Bauer as Polly Bunderhoof, “a one-time siren Scream-Queen, now turned, craft services ‘cougar’ girl”; a reference to Bauer's work in pornographic and horror films throughout The 80's and the Gingerdead Man's 3rd victim.
- Bruce Dent as Ricki Johnson, makeup artist and the Gingerdead Man's 2nd victim.
- Emily Button as Wendy Heinz
- Parker Young as Cornelius Entemann, a young, attractive Alactor and the Gingerdead Man's 4th victim.
- Vivian Waye as Zira Cinabonus
- Bryce Wagoner as Tim Nestle
- Johnnie Oberg Jr. as Butch Pillsbury
- Kenneth J. Hall as Lord Astroth
- Chi Chi Garcia as Cholo Wardrobe Lady
- Nick Green as Hungry-Man Grip
- David Sivits as Muscle Angel
- Ricardo Gil as Angry Elf
- Julian Fries as Bitter Efx Guy
- Travis Dixon as Major Nelson Newton
- Junie Hoang as Ensign Del Rio
- Nic Haas (Nick Hawk) as Lieutenant Grant Ginger
- Bryan Pisano as Dr. Lupas Callahan
- Nicole Shilperoort as Nubile Untouched Young Virgin
- Nicolas Leiting as Killer Robot
- JD Parsons as Bewildered Production Assistant
- Kennedy Clarke as Burned-Out Crew Member
- Zach Wagoner as Flabbergasted Efx Guy
- Michael Penfold as Beaten Down Crew Member
- Merideth Corrado as Roid-Rage Fueled Crew Member
- James R. Rosenthal as Hungover Crew Member
- Edgar Allan Poe as Scary Writer Dude
- Pieter Coulson as Shady Crew Member
- David DeCoteau as Himself
- Greg Nicotero as Himself
- Adam Green as Toothless McHomeless
- Stephanie Denton as Still Owes Silvia Twenty Bucks

== Production ==
After directing Furnace in 2007, William Butler was asked by Charles Band if he wanted to return to the Gingerdead Man series and direct the sequel, having written the original script for the first film before it was retooled. He agreed, on the condition that he could do whatever he wanted, as long as it fit within the budget. Butler directed the film under the pseudonym Silvia St. Croix (a reference to the 1992 musical Ruthless!) partly due to embarrassment over his involvement in the film, as well as a contractual obligation from Disney, whom he was employed with at the time.

== Reception ==
Gingerdead Man 2: Passion of the Crust received mixed reviews.

The website GeekTyrant gave a positive review stating, "Gingerdead Man 2: The Passion of the Crust is as much fun as you could expect from a Full Moon movie. Watching each victim (this time on a movie set) get stalked down and killed by this killer cookie is just laughable yet still enjoyable to the point it just draws you in."

Review site That Was A Bit Mental praised how the film was a jab at the film history of Full Moon Entertainment involving dolls or toys in the plot of many of their stories, such as their Puppet Master films. They said in their review "There’s no need to see the original Gingerdead Man, but if you fancy a self-aware film that’s deliberately cheap and nasty and makes fun of itself for being so, then give this a go."

Dread Central also praised the self-aware nature of the movie, but criticized the somewhat bitter delivery of the film regarding critics which was expressed throughout. Their review stated, "though I must say it takes a certain degree of ballsy cynicism to make a movie where you basically admit the movies you make are crap while still taking considerable time to bitch about online critics like myself who pan them for being crap, even more so when you consider this movie was directed by someone who chose to use a pseudonym rather than put their real name in the credits." The site also criticized the DVD release for its lack of interesting special features for it is just trailers for previous Full Moon Entertainment films.

Pop Horror review for Gingerdead Man 2 was positive, finding the characters to be better written and liking the use of practical effects. The less serious tone compared to the previous film was also praised. The review concluded "All in all, Full Moon scores a goal with Gingerdead Man 2: Passion of the Crust. It’s trashy entertainment at its finest!"

Felix Vasquez Jr. at Cinema Crazed gave the film a negative review and wrote: "Mostly forgettable, and clocking in at a little over an hour, it's just lazy."

== Release ==
Gingerdead Man 2: Passion of the Crust was released direct to video on DVD on June 24, 2008. An alternate DVD exclusive to Full Moon's website was available that featured different box art with the Gingerdead Man crucified on a cross. The film became available on Blu-ray for the first time in 2025 as part of a box set that also includes Blu-ray editions of the other films in the series, the crossover, and the spin-off The Gingerweed Man. Scenes from the film are included in a special edition Blu-ray released in December 2025 titled the Gingerdead Man: Murder-Thon containing highlights of the series edited into one film.

== Sequel ==
On July 16, 2008, Charles Band announced that he would be making Gingerdead Man 3: Saturday Night Cleaver, which he expected to be released in 2009. The film was initially slated for a 2009 release, but this was delayed until September 13, 2011.

== See also ==
- Killer toy
