= Arloa Reston =

American actress (born 1978)

Arloa Reston (born March 8, 1978) is an American actress.

== Early life ==
Arloa was born in Cheyenne, Wyoming, the youngest of two children. Her father was a Colonel in the U.S. Air Force which allowed Arloa to grow up all over the world, living in Europe, Asia and much of the United States. Her ethnic background is a mix of Latin American, European, Scandinavian and Asian.

== Career ==
Arloa was destined to be a performer: her father was the lead guitarist and singer of a rock and roll band, her mother dabbled in modeling and acting and her grandmother is a singer. At the age of four, Arloa played the Virgin Mary in her church play. Her first paid gig was in high school as an actress and host on a national television show for two years while her family was stationed in Korea. After high school, she moved to New York, studied with Bill Esper, worked in theatre and landed her first U.S. television role on the soap opera Another World. Shortly after the soap ended, Arloa booked back-to-back roles in two feature films which took her from New York to Los Angeles where she currently resides and works.

== Filmography ==
Arloa Reston's film and television credits:

=== Television ===
- Femme Fatales (2011)
- Desperate Housewives (2010)
- Outlaw (2010)
- The Middleman (2008)
- Ugly Betty (2007)
- Mind of Mencia (2007)
- Beyond the Break (2006)
- Days of Our Lives (2004–2006)
- Saurian (2006)
- Joey (2005)
- She Spies (2003)
- Another World (1995)

=== Movies ===
- The Collection (2012) - Lisa
- Sideshow Attraction (2006) - Ezmerelda
- The Strange Case of Dr. Jekyll and Mr. Hyde (2006) - Gloria Hatten
- Charming (2005) - Jade
- Virginia (2005) - Irene
- Fronterz (2004)
- The Kiss (2004) - Woodswoman
- Still Single (2004) - Elisa
- Invisible Evidence (2003) - Veronica
- The Look (2003)
- 25th Hour (2002)
- Johnny Suede (1991)
