= Ghoulies =

1985 film

- Theatrical release poster
- Directed by: Luca Bercovici
- Written by: Luca Bercovici; Jefery Levy
- Produced by: Jefery Levy
- Starring: Peter Liapis; Lisa Pelikan; Michael Des Barres; Scott Thomson; Mariska Hargitay; Jack Nance
- Cinematography: Mac Ahlberg
- Edited by: Ted Nicolaou
- Music by: Richard Band; Shirley Walker
- Production company: Ghoulies Productions
- Distributed by: Empire Pictures
- Release date: January 18, 1985
- Running time: 81 minutes
- Country: United States
- Language: English
- Budget: $200,000-$400,000
- Box office: $35 million

Ghoulies is a 1985 American horror film, directed by Luca Bercovici in his directorial debut. The film was co-written with producer Jefery Levy. It stars Peter Liapis, Lisa Pelikan, Michael Des Barres, Jack Nance, Scott Thomson, and Mariska Hargitay. The film follows a young man named Jonathan Graves who, after inheriting his satanic father's estate, becomes seduced by its occult secrets. It is the first in the Ghoulies film series. It received negative reviews from critics.

== Plot ==
Malcolm Graves, the leader of a satanic cult, is about to sacrifice his child Jonathan when his mother, Anastasia, places a protective talisman around Jonathan's neck. Malcolm orders a participant named Wolfgang to take the child away, and sacrifices her instead. Twenty-five years later, an adult Jonathan and his girlfriend Rebecca inherit his late father's estate, where they find several books on magic and a basement full of occult paraphernalia. They throw a party. Jonathan recruits his friends to perform a ritual in the basement for fun. When he begins conducting the ritual, Jonathan abruptly becomes short-tempered. Everyone leaves when the ritual fails, but a small creature materializes in the basement.

The next day, Jonathan tells Rebecca he is quitting college to work on the estate. She expresses concern, which grows when Jonathan refuses to eat, explaining that he is fasting. He conjures several creatures called Ghoulies, and proclaims himself their master, demanding they hide their existence from everyone but him. One day, Rebecca comes home to find Jonathan in the basement wearing a dripping wet robe. He explains that he was trying to learn about the parents which he never knew, and promises to stop his behavior. He gives her the protective talisman as a gift, urging her to never take it off. While they are having sex, a Ghoulie draws an occult diagram under the bed which prompts Jonathan to chant in another language. A furious Rebecca leaves him.

Jonathan summons two dwarfs named Grizzel and Greedigut to his service, who promise to give him everything he desires. They explain that he must perform a dangerous ritual with seven other people to obtain the knowledge and power he seeks. Rebecca returns and asks Jonathan to leave with her, but he refuses and reveals he has green eyes. In a pique of anger, she tears off the talisman, unwittingly enabling Jonathan to hypnotize her, forcing her to do his bidding. He invites his friends and bewitches them to participate in the ritual. As Jonathan, Rebecca, their friends, Grizzel, and Greedigut all chant, Malcolm is resurrected from the grave. Oblivious to this, Jonathan invites his friends to stay the night.

Malcolm proclaims himself the real master to the Ghoulies and dwarfs, and commands them to kill Jonathan's friends. Meanwhile, Jonathan apologizes to Rebecca and breaks the spell by placing the talisman around her neck, but she falls into a deep sleep. She wakes up to see Jonathan in a trance, and runs away. After she removes the talisman around her neck, Jonathan and the Ghoulies attack her and she is magically shoved down a flight of stairs to her death. Jonathan brings her to the basement to resurrect her, where he finds the dead bodies of his friends underneath sheets.

Malcolm appears with the dwarfs, revealing that he used Jonathan to resurrect him in order to capture his youth and sacrifice him. He also admits that it was he who killed Rebecca, not Jonathan. Malcolm resurrects Rebecca to distract Jonathan, but the dwarfs alert him of the trap. Wolfgang appears and fights Malcolm with his own magical powers. The house begins to crumble, and Wolfgang defeats Malcolm before they both disappear. Jonathan's friends are resurrected, and they drive away as Grizzel and Greedigut wave farewell. Mike asks what is happening. Jonathan assures him it is over, but Mike is unconvinced after he sees the Ghoulies in the car with them.

== Cast ==
- Peter Liapis as Jonathan Graves
  - Jamie Bronow as Jonathan Graves as a child
- Lisa Pelikan as Rebecca
- Scott Thomson as Mike
- Ralph Seymour as Mark "Toad Boy"
- Mariska Hargitay as Donna
- Keith Joe Dick as Dick
- David Dayan as Eddie
- Victoria Catlin as Anastasia
- Charene Cathleen as Robin
- Tamara De Treaux as Greedigut
- Peter Risch as Grizzel
- Michael Des Barres as Malcolm Graves
- Jack Nance as Wolfgang
- Bobbie Bresee as Temptress
- Brian Connolly as Ghoulie (voice)
- Annie Stocking as Ghoulie (voice)
- Craig Talmy as Ghoulie (voice)

== Production ==
Ghoulies originated as a one-location horror film by Luca Bercovici and his writing partner Jefery Levy. The concept was pitched by Bercovici to executive producer Charles Band, with whom he previously worked as an actor on the film Parasite (1982). Band was originally slated to direct Ghoulies, reuniting the pairing of Band as director and Stan Winston as makeup and effects supervisor from Parasite. However, after Winston dropped out of the project, Band decided to step back into a producer role and chose Bercovici to direct.

Principal photography began on January 30, 1984, at the Wattles Mansion, which served as the film's main location, in Los Angeles, California, after being in pre-production for five months. During its fifth week of filming, Hemdale Film Corporation was set to handle the film's domestic distribution. However, the company remained uncredited when they later filed a lawsuit against Charles Band and Ghoulies Productions, citing "misrepresentation" after Band allegedly misled the company regarding the home video sales and distribution.

The film was in production at the same time as Joe Dante's film Gremlins (1984). Warner Bros. sued to stop Ghoulies Productions from using the title, but lost. Halfway through shooting, Band ran out of money, so the filmmakers spent months searching for funding, which allowed Gremlins to be released first.

== Release ==
The film premiered in Los Angeles on January 18, 1985, opening in 350 theaters before premiering in New York on March 1.

=== Critical response ===
On review aggregator website Rotten Tomatoes, the film holds a 7% approval rating, based on 14 reviews.

Vincent Canby of The New York Times dismissed the film as "a cut-rate 'Gremlins'" with "unexceptional performances" and "a lot of badly simulated gore". Variety wrote that the film "has a quaint corniness about it, as if it were a cheapie horror movie from the 1950s ... Special effects and production values are mediocre, which in this case is part of the fun". Michael Wilmington of the Los Angeles Times wrote: "Cinematographer Mac Ahlberg contributes eerily lit camera work that occasionally achieves surprising atmosphere and delicacy, and John Carl Buechler's creations, the ghoulies themselves—foul, reptilian little beings coated with some obscene glittering, mucous-like moisture—have a certain nauseating charm. From there, however, it's a steep slide downhill". Kim Newman of The Monthly Film Bulletin called it "an unashamed rip-off which contrives to ignore its obvious inspiration (Gremlins) and comes up with yet another prime example of the comic book-ish vitality, wit and simplicity which has become Band's trademark".
