= Ghoulies (film series) =

Film series

- Created by: Luca Bercovici; Jefery Levy
- Original work: Film
- Years: 1985–94

Print publications
- Book: The Complete History of Ghoulies (2021)

Films and television
- Films: Ghoulies (1985); Ghoulies II (1987); Ghoulies III: Ghoulies Go to College (1991); Ghoulies IV (1994)
- Direct-to-video: Ghoulies: From Toilets to Terror - The Making of Ghoulies (2015); Ghoulies II: More Toilets, More Terror - The Making of Ghoulies II (2015)

Ghoulies is an American horror comedy film series that consists of four films released from 1985 to 1994. The films center on a group of small demonic creatures that have a wide range of twisted appearances.

== Films ==
Film	Director	Production	Writer(s)	Producer(s)
Ghoulies (1985)	Luca Bercovici	Empire International Pictures	Luca Bercovici; Jefery Levy	Jefery Levy
Ghoulies II (1987)	Albert Band	Empire International Pictures	Dennis Paoli	Albert Band
Ghoulies III: Ghoulies Go to College (1991)	John Carl Buechler	Vestron Pictures	Brent Olson	Iain Paterson
Ghoulies IV (1994)	Jim Wynorski	CineTel Films	Mark Sevi	Gary Schmoeller

=== Ghoulies (1985) ===
The plot of this film centers on Jonathan Graves (Peter Liapis), a college student who uncovers his late father's occult paraphernalia in his family's mansion. Graves tries to summon up the demonic forces his father dabbled with, in hopes of gaining supernatural powers. Consequently, the little Ghoulies are summoned to descend on the manor and terrorize everyone who participated in the ritual. The film also stars Lisa Pelikan, Michael Des Barres, Jack Nance, and Mariska Hargitay in her film debut.

Ghoulies was pitched as a one-location horror film by director Luca Bercovici and his writing partner Jefery Levy to Charles Band by Bercovici. The film premiered in Los Angeles on January 18, 1985, and in New York on March 1.

According to stories that Charles Band tells on his Full Moon Horror Road Show, he was tasked to come up with a great campaign to promote the film. During a brainstorming session with Gary Allen, he came up with the idea to have the Ghoulie popping up from the toilet. Although Band has claimed that the scene with the Ghoulie popping out of the toilet was shot after the fact to mirror the poster image, Luca Bercovici says that it was part of the original shoot.

=== Ghoulies II (1987) ===
In the second installment, the Ghoulies hitch a ride with a carnival and end up hiding in an amusement park funhouse called "Satan's Den" which becomes a smash hit when visitors believe the little demons are part of the attraction – that is, until people start falling victim to the evil creatures. The film stars Damon Martin, Dale Wyatt, Royal Dano, Phil Fondacaro and J. Downing.

The film was again produced by Empire Pictures and directed by Charles Band's father Albert Band. It was also the last entry to have any involvement from Charles Band, as he sold the rights to Vestron Pictures to save Empire Pictures, which was struggling financially at the time. Ghoulies and Ghoulies II were released as a double feature DVD from MGM Home Entertainment in 2003 and as a double feature Blu-ray from Scream Factory in 2015. While both releases include theatrical trailers, the Blu-ray special features include commentaries, interviews, and still galleries. In 2017 Austrian company NSM Records released Ghoulies II on Blu-ray in a fully uncut R-rated version, marking the first time the movie had been released uncut since the original cast and crew premiere.

=== Ghoulies III: Ghoulies Go to College (1991) ===
In the third installment, the little demons are summoned at a college campus by Professor Ragnar (Kevin McCarthy), who is obsessed with the occult. Soon the creatures wreak havoc that is initially dismissed as elaborate pranks by the partying frat houses during the annual "Prank Week" - that is, until a couple at the school realize that the pranks are not so innocent this time.

The film also stars Eva LaRue and Patrick Labyorteaux.

The third film saw Buechler step into the director's chair and was released straight-to-video in 1991 by Vestron Video after a theatrical release fell through. The film co-starred genre stalwart Kevin McCarthy and is the first film where the Ghoulies actually speak. The film was released on DVD by Lionsgate as part of an eight-horror movie DVD set. It received a Blu-ray release in July 2025 on Lionsgate's Vestron Video label. This is Matthew Lillard's film debut.

=== Ghoulies IV (1994) ===
In the final installment, Jonathan Graves (Peter Liapis) returns, this time a retired-occultist-turned police officer. His latest assignment finds him battling his former girlfriend Alexandra (Stacie Randall), who has escaped an asylum and tries to summon forth the demonic forces Graves trifled with in the first film.

The film also stars Barbara Alyn Woods, was directed by Jim Wynorski, was made by CineTel Films, and also released straight-to-video in 1994 by Columbia TriStar Home Video. Instead of the puppet Ghoulies of the previous films, the movie cast little actors in costumes. Ghoulies IV was released on DVD in 2007 by Echo Bridge Home Entertainment.

== Characters ==
=== Ghoulies ===
Ghoulie	Ghoulies	Ghoulies II	Ghoulies III	Ghoulies IV
Fish Ghoulie	✓	✓	✓	Archival footage
Cat Ghoulie	✓	✓	✓	Archival footage
Rat Ghoulie	✓	✓	✓	Archival footage
Flying Ghoulie	✓	✓	✗	Archival footage
Clown Doll Ghoulie	✓	✗	✗	✗
Other Fish Ghoulies	✓	✗	✗	✗
Toad Ghoulie	✗	✓	✗	✗
Giant Ghoulie	✗	✓	✗	✗
Lite Ghoulie	✗	✗	✗	✓
Dark Ghoulie	✗	✗	✗	✓
