= Alias (TV series) =

American spy-action television series

- Genre: Action; Drama; Science fiction; Spy thriller
- Created by: J. J. Abrams
- Showrunners: J. J. Abrams (seasons 1–3); Jeff Pinkner (seasons 4–5)
- Starring: Jennifer Garner; Ron Rifkin; Michael Vartan; Bradley Cooper; Merrin Dungey; Carl Lumbly; Kevin Weisman; Victor Garber; David Anders; Lena Olin; Greg Grunberg; Melissa George; Mía Maestro; Rachel Nichols; Balthazar Getty; Élodie Bouchez; Amy Acker
- Theme music composer: J. J. Abrams
- Composer: Michael Giacchino
- Country of origin: United States
- Original language: English
- No. of seasons: 5
- No. of episodes: 105 (list of episodes)

Production
- Executive producers: J. J. Abrams; John Eisendrath; Ken Olin; Alex Kurtzman; Roberto Orci; Jesse Alexander; Jeffrey Bell; Jeff Pinkner
- Producers: Sarah Caplan; Robert M. Williams Jr.; Monica Breen; Alison Schapker; Chad Savage; Jennifer Garner
- Running time: 42–45 minutes
- Production companies: Bad Robot; Touchstone Television

Original release
- Network: ABC
- Release: September 30, 2001 – May 22, 2006

Alias is an American spy action thriller television series created by J. J. Abrams that was broadcast on ABC for five seasons from September 30, 2001, to May 22, 2006. It stars Jennifer Garner as Sydney Bristow, a double agent for the Central Intelligence Agency posing as an operative for SD-6, a worldwide criminal and espionage organization. Main co-stars throughout all five seasons included Michael Vartan as Michael Vaughn, Ron Rifkin as Arvin Sloane, and Victor Garber as Jack Bristow.

The first two seasons of Alias mainly explore Sydney's obligation to hide her true career from her friends and family as she assumes multiple aliases to carry out missions as well as her efforts to take down SD-6 with the help of the CIA. The series' later seasons deal with multiple character and plot-driven storylines, with a recurring focus on the search for and recovery of artifacts created by Milo Rambaldi, a fictitious Renaissance-era figure with similarities to both Leonardo da Vinci and Nostradamus.

Alias was well received among critics and has been included in several "best of" lists, including the American Film Institute's top ten list for television programs in 2003. The series also received numerous awards and nominations. Alias is considered to be part of a wave of television series from the late 1990s and early 2000s that feature strong female characters, alongside Buffy the Vampire Slayer, Xena: Warrior Princess, La Femme Nikita, and Dark Angel.

== Plot ==
=== Season 1 (2001–02) ===
Seven years before the first episode, Sydney Bristow was an undergraduate student. She was approached by someone who claimed to work for the Central Intelligence Agency and offered her a job as an agent. Having accepted, she was assigned to a unit called SD-6, which she was told was a secret "Black Ops" section of the CIA. She became a field agent. In the pilot, she tells her fiancé Danny Hecht (played by Edward Atterton) that she is a spy and as a result of her revealing SD-6's existence to him, Danny is murdered by SD-6. She discovers that her father Jack Bristow is also an SD-6 agent and that SD-6 is not part of the CIA; instead, it is part of the Alliance of Twelve, an organization that is an enemy to the United States. Sydney decides to offer her services to the real CIA as a double agent. Having learned that her father is also a double agent for the CIA, she begins the long and arduous task of destroying SD-6 from the inside.

Major plotlines from season 1 include Sydney hiding her triple identity from her friends, both in her personal life and in her SD-6 job, Will Tippin's investigation into Danny's death, the race to find Milo Rambaldi (a 15th century philosopher with an uncanny understanding of the future) artifacts, and the past activities of Sydney's mother. Sub-plots include Sydney's friendship with Francie, Francie's romantic relationship with Charlie, and Sydney's developing relationship with her CIA handler Michael Vaughn, of whom she is skeptical at first but grows to trust as her life becomes increasingly stressful. Season One focuses on the development of Sydney's character and allows the audience to become familiar with her.

=== Season 2 (2002–03) ===
The second season begins with the introduction of Irina Derevko, Sydney's mother, who soon becomes a key character in the series. Midway through the second season, the series underwent a "reboot" of sorts with Sydney successfully destroying SD-6 and becoming a regular agent for the CIA, still in pursuit of former SD-6 leader Arvin Sloane, his associate Julian Sark, and the Rambaldi artifacts. Sydney's friends at SD-6, Marcus Dixon and Marshall Flinkman, are finally made aware of her dual identity and recruited into the CIA. Sydney also begins a romantic relationship with Vaughn, now that their relationship will not endanger them.

In the second half of the season, it is revealed that Francie Calfo, Sydney's best friend, was murdered and replaced by Allison Doren, a woman who was transfigured to look exactly like her. Allison was then in a position to spy on Sydney and Will. The end of the season saw Will possibly murdered and Sydney killing Allison and then falling unconscious. Sydney awakens two years later in Hong Kong, unable to remember the two years that have passed. She soon learns that her friends and the CIA believed her to be dead, and Vaughn found a new love and is now married.

=== Season 3 (2003–04) ===
The third season takes place two years after the events of season 2, with Sydney having been missing and presumed dead. DNA evidence in a badly burned body confirmed her death to her family and friends. The truth, however, is that Sydney was kidnapped by a terrorist organization called The Covenant, who tried to brainwash her into believing she was an assassin named Julia Thorne. Eventually Sydney voluntarily had her memories of the two years erased in an attempt to forget some of the deeds she was forced to undertake as Julia and to ensure that one of Rambaldi's most dangerous artifacts would never be found.

As Sydney recovers, she begins investigating her absence while reintegrating into the CIA. There she deals with the facts that Arvin Sloane had become a world-renowned humanitarian after being pardoned, and that Michael Vaughn had married NSC agent Lauren Reed. Reed is later revealed to be a member of the Covenant and a lover of Julian Sark. The National Security Council plays a role as a government organization that holds massive unsupervised power, with a Guantanamo-like detention facility, considerable influence over the CIA, and driven by questionable motives. Sydney later discovers that her mother and Arvin Sloane had a child together, the result of an affair between the two years before Sydney's birth. She locates her half-sister, Nadia, and rescues her from being killed by the Covenant. At the end of the season, Sydney goes on a mission and encounters Lauren. After they battle, Lauren begins to taunt Sydney by saying she has information about her past. When Vaughn shows up, Sydney goes to him, leaving Lauren a chance to attack again. Vaughn shoots Lauren, and she dies, but before she does, she gives Sydney the number of a security deposit box where she can find information about her past.

=== Season 4 (2005) ===
Season 4 begins where season three ended: with Sydney uncovering a shocking, classified document called "S.A.B. 47 Project." It is explained that the document authorizes Jack Bristow to execute Sydney's mother, who mysteriously placed a contract on Sydney's life (this was apparently something of a retcon to cover for actress Lena Olin presumably not returning to the series). The first page refers to Sydney as the "active" subject of a "project" that began on April 17, 1975, a possible reference to Project Christmas, and also setting up Jack as either the real head of (or somehow involved with) the Covenant and/or being a descendant of Rambaldi or Rambaldi himself. Sydney joins a black ops division of the CIA, patterned after SD-6 and run by her one-time nemesis Arvin Sloane. The new division is dubbed "APO": Authorized Personnel Only. Members of APO (all hand-picked by Sloane) include almost all of the recurring characters from previous seasons, including Jack, Vaughn, Sydney's former partner (and third-season CIA director) Marcus Dixon, the computer and technical genius, Marshall Flinkman, and Vaughn's best friend Eric Weiss (brought in after having to be rescued by Sydney and Vaughn, who he previously believed to have left the CIA). Sloane's daughter and Sydney's half-sister Nadia Santos also eventually returns to join APO.

During the season, an Arvin Sloane impostor, jokingly identified as "Arvin Clone", acquired the technology to implement a Rambaldi-predicted apocalypse. Using Omnifam, the real Sloane had polluted the world's drinking water with chemicals that caused feelings of peace and tranquility. However, these feelings can be reversed with the Mueller device. The third Derevko sister, Elena, had built a giant Mueller device in Sovogda, Russia, which drove the residents to insanity. Sydney, Jack, Irina, Nadia, and Vaughn parachute in, destroy the device and kill Elena. But Nadia is injected with the tainted water and driven insane. She battles Sydney until Sloane is forced to shoot his own daughter. Nadia is later put into a coma while a cure is sought, and Irina is allowed to escape. The season concludes with Sydney and Vaughn becoming engaged. On a trip to Santa Barbara, Vaughn confides a shocking secret: his name isn't really Michael Vaughn; their initial meeting wasn't coincidental; and that his allegiance may not be to the CIA. Before he can divulge any more information, another car crashes into theirs and the season ends.

=== Season 5 (2005–06) ===
The cast of season five

As season five begins, Vaughn is abducted. Sydney learns that Vaughn is under suspicion of being a double agent and that the crash may have been a cover for his extraction. Vaughn later escapes and explains to Sydney that his real name is André Michaux. He reveals that he is investigating a secret operation known as Prophet Five, which at one point involved his father. During a mission in recovering a Prophet Five book, Sydney receives a phone call from her doctor with some untimely news – she's pregnant. (This development was created to deal with the actress' real-life pregnancy.) Vaughn is later shot, and apparently killed, on orders of Prophet Five operative Gordon Dean. Four months later, as Sydney continues to investigate Vaughn's murder, she works with an assassin and associate of his, Renée Rienne, in order to unearth the inner workings of Prophet Five, while at the same time trailing Dean and his criminal organization "The Shed", disguised as a black ops CIA division, very much like SD-6.

Two new members are added to APO to replace Weiss, who moved to Washington, D.C. for a new job, and Nadia, who is still in a coma. Thomas Grace is a brash young agent with unorthodox methods who often butts heads with Sydney. Rachel Gibson is a computer specialist who, like Sydney, was deceived into thinking she was working for the real CIA and briefly works as a mole within The Shed, as did Sydney within SD-6, before The Shed's destruction by Dean. Sydney's mom and dad help her deliver her baby girl while under attack in a high-rise in Vancouver, Canada, on a mission in season 5, episode 11: "Maternal Instinct." Shortly afterwards, it's finally revealed that Vaughn is alive—living and hiding in Nepal. In an ongoing subplot, Arvin Sloane follows his own personal obsession, finding a cure for Nadia. Sloane is jailed for his actions during Season 4; however, he is released after the sentencing committee is manipulated by Dean. In exchange for his freedom, Sloane is now working for Dean as a mole within APO. Unaware of Sloane's new allegiance, Jack agrees to let Sloane rejoin APO and use its resources to seek a cure for his daughter.

With the series' end, it emerges that Sloane's ultimate goal is that of immortality, for which he sacrifices his daughter Nadia's life. However, he is trapped in Rambaldi's tomb by a critically wounded Jack, who sacrifices himself via a bomb to avenge all the pain Sloane caused Sydney over the years. Thus, moments after Sloane achieves immortality, he is trapped for all of eternity in a cave, where even Nadia's ghost deserts him. Sydney tracks Sark and the Horizon to Hong Kong, finding Irina. After a final battle between them, Irina plunges to her death. The series ends with a flash forward to several years in the future. Sydney and Vaughn are semi-retired and married, with a second child named Jack in honor of Sydney's father. Daughter Isabelle exhibits the same ability to complete the CIA test that marked Sydney's inborn skills to be an ideal agent at that age. After Isabelle completes the puzzle, Sydney calls to her from outside, asking what she is doing. She responds by saying, "Nothing", as she casually knocks it over before running outside to join everyone.

== Cast ==
=== Main characters ===
Actor	Character	Seasons				
Actor	Character	1	2	3	4	5
Jennifer Garner	Sydney Bristow	Main	Main	Main	Main	Main
Ron Rifkin	Arvin Sloane	Main	Main	Main	Main	Main
Michael Vartan (Note: Vartan was credited as a main cast member in the season 5 premiere, and then as a Special guest star in his later appearances in the season.)	Michael Vaughn	Main	Main	Main	Main	Main
Bradley Cooper	Will Tippin	Main	Main	Special Guest		Special Guest
Merrin Dungey	Francie Calfo / Allison Doren	Main	Main	Recurring		Special Guest
Carl Lumbly	Marcus Dixon	Main	Main	Main	Main	Main
Kevin Weisman	Marshall Flinkman	Main	Main	Main	Main	Main
Victor Garber	Jack Bristow	Main	Main	Main	Main	Main
David Anders	Julian Sark	Recurring	Main	Main	Special Guest	Recurring
Lena Olin	Irina Derevko	Stand-in	Main		Special Guest	Recurring
Greg Grunberg	Eric Weiss	Recurring	Recurring	Main	Main	Recurring
Melissa George	Lauren Reed			Main	Special Guest	
Mía Maestro	Nadia Santos			Recurring	Main	Recurring
Rachel Nichols	Rachel Gibson					Main
Balthazar Getty	Thomas Grace					Main
Élodie Bouchez	Renée Rienne					Main
Amy Acker	Kelly Peyton					Main

Alias featured an ensemble cast portraying the various people in Sydney's life. During the course of the series, every main character becomes involved in the world of espionage in some form or another.

- Sydney Bristow (Jennifer Garner), the daughter of Jack Bristow and Irina Derevko, is a graduate student in English in Los Angeles. She moonlights as an operative for SD-6, which she initially believed was a black ops division of the CIA. Her fiancé was murdered in the pilot episode, and she then learned SD-6 is actually a branch of an international criminal organization known as the Alliance of Twelve. She then becomes a double agent for the real CIA. She would later become a member of APO, a black-ops division of the CIA. Sydney has 41 confirmed kills through the series.
- Arvin Sloane (Ron Rifkin) was the head of SD-6 and APO, the show's main antagonist. Originally a loyal CIA officer, he is obsessed with the work of a 15th-century prophet, Milo Rambaldi. Though sometimes showing a genuine affection to the Bristows, he is always ready to hurt them and even kill them, and vice versa.
- Michael Vaughn (Michael Vartan) was Sydney's CIA handler and later partner. He and Sydney share a mutual attraction, which eventually leads to a relationship. At the end of Season 4, it is revealed that it was not a coincidence that he met Sydney. Despite departing in season 5 as a series regular, Vartan's character was still credited as a main cast member in the first episode then special guest star in the latter part of the season.
- Will Tippin (Bradley Cooper) was a reporter for a local newspaper, and he is one of Sydney's two best friends. After the death of Sydney's fiancé, Will begins to investigate, and eventually learns of the existence of SD-6. The discovery threatens his life, but he later is recruited as an analyst for the CIA. He is put into witness protection at the beginning of Season Three. The character makes occasional guest appearances in later seasons.
- Francie Calfo (Merrin Dungey) is Sydney's other best friend. When Season 1 begins, she is Sydney's roommate and fellow graduate student. In Season 2, she drops out of her graduate program and opens a restaurant in the Silver Lake neighborhood of Los Angeles. She remains largely unaware of the spy world until the middle of season two when she is killed, and her identity is stolen by a doppelgänger. She (and her double) also dated Will during the second season.
- Marcus Dixon (Carl Lumbly) is Sydney's partner and friend at SD-6. He is the first one to notice signs of Sydney's betrayal, but dismisses his thoughts as foolish. During the two-year gap between the second and third season, he became a director at the CIA. However, he later resigns as he thinks the office job just is not for him. Dixon later joins APO.
- Marshall Flinkman (Kevin Weisman) worked in tech support at SD-6. He takes up the same role in the CIA and at APO. Even though he is not field-trained, he has participated in missions on several occasions.
- Jack Bristow (Victor Garber) is Sydney's father, and also works for SD-6, but he is actually a double agent for the CIA. In Season 1, his relationship with Sydney is strained. He was devastated by her mother's "death," and kept Sydney at arm's length for the rest of her childhood. As a CIA agent, he is exceptionally ruthless and skillful as evidenced by his CIA call sign, "Raptor." After Sloane left, Jack took over as head of APO.
- Eric Weiss (Greg Grunberg) is a friend of Vaughn's, and also a CIA agent. He later forges a relationship with Sydney's sister, Nadia. Against his over-the-top colleagues, he keeps a more human and gentle demeanor.
- Julian Sark (David Anders) is originally introduced as an operative working for Sydney's mother, but he later proves to be an antagonist on his own. He has an instinct for self-preservation, thus making his loyalty flexible. During the third season, he becomes the partner-in-crime of Vaughn's wife, Lauren, and eventually begins a relationship with her.
- Irina Derevko (Lena Olin) was a former Russian spy, and she is also the mother of Sydney Bristow. During the 1970s, she was sent to the United States, with the objective to seduce and marry Jack Bristow so she could steal information from him about a project he was working on. She has also assassinated several CIA officers, including Vaughn's father.
- Lauren Reed (Melissa George) is a NSC liaison at the CIA and marries Vaughn during the two-year gap between the second and third season. She is later revealed to be a mole sent by The Covenant to watch over Vaughn should Sydney contact him during her involvement with them and also to steal crucial information from the CIA.
- Nadia Santos (Mía Maestro) is Sydney's half-sister, and the daughter of Irina Derevko and Arvin Sloane. Introduced at the end of the third season, she is "The Passenger," a person who provides a direct line to Rambaldi. Prior to joining the CIA, she worked for the Argentine Intelligence.
- Rachel Gibson (Rachel Nichols) is a computer genius introduced at the beginning of Season Five as an operative working for an organization that poses as the CIA, known as The Shed. Unaware of this, she indirectly helps to apparently kill Michael Vaughn. After the truth is revealed to her, she joins the CIA in order to take down the organization that had lied to her, much like Sydney did years before.
- Thomas Grace (Balthazar Getty) is an operative who is hired by Jack to join APO after the apparent death of Michael Vaughn. Years ago, his wife was shot and killed by an assassin who was intending to kill him.
- Renée Rienne (Élodie Bouchez) is an international terrorist known as "The Raven," who worked for years with Vaughn to investigate a group of people known as "The Prophet Five." After Vaughn's assassination by the Prophet Five, she allies with Sydney to take down the group.
- Kelly Peyton (Amy Acker) is a friend and former colleague of Rachel's. She works for The Shed, and later directly for the Prophet Five. Together with the Derevko sisters, or maybe more, she is the most ruthless character of the show.

=== Recurring characters ===
Characters are listed in order of appearance on the show.

Actor	Character	Seasons				
Actor	Character	1	2	3	4	5
Angus Scrimm	Calvin McCullough	Recurring	Recurring		Guest	
Ric Young	Dr. Zhang Lee	Recurring	Recurring	Guest		
Evan Parke	Charlie Bernard	Recurring				
Sarah Shahi	Jenny	Recurring				
Gina Torres	Anna Espinosa	Recurring			Recurring	Guest
Yvonne Farrow	Diane Dixon	Recurring	Recurring			
James Handy	CIA Director Arthur Devlin	Recurring	Recurring			Guest
Joey Slotnick	Steven Haladki	Recurring				
Patricia Wettig	Dr. Judy Barnett	Recurring	Recurring	Recurring		
Amy Irving	Emily Sloane	Recurring	Recurring		Guest	
Terry O'Quinn	FBI Assistant Director Kendall	Guest	Recurring	Guest		
Amanda Foreman	Carrie Bowman		Guest	Recurring	Guest	Guest
Kurt Fuller	NSC Director Robert Lindsey			Recurring		
Isabella Rossellini	Katya Derevko			Recurring	Recurring	
Angela Bassett	CIA Director Hayden Chase				Recurring	
Sônia Braga	Elena Derevko				Recurring	

In addition, Alias also featured many other famous actors in roles ranging from single-episode guest appearances to semi-recurring characters, including Jonathan Banks as Frederick Brandon, Raymond J. Barry as Senator George Reed, Tobin Bell as Karl Dreyer, Peter Berg as Noah Hicks, David Carradine as Conrad, David Cronenberg as Dr. Brezzel, Faye Dunaway as Ariana Kane, Griffin Dunne as Leonid Lisenker, Vivica A. Fox as Toni Cummings, Ricky Gervais as Daniel Ryan, John Hannah as Martin Shepard, Rutger Hauer as Anthony Geiger, Ethan Hawke as James Lennox, Djimon Hounsou as Kazari Bomani, Richard Lewis as Mitchell Yaeger, Peggy Lipton as Olivia Reed, Sir Roger Moore as Edward Poole, Richard Roundtree as Thomas Brill, Jason Segel as Sam Hauser, Christian Slater as Neil Caplan, Quentin Tarantino as McKenas Cole, Justin Theroux as Simon Walker, Keone Young as Professor Choy, and Danny Trejo as Emilio Vargas.

== Production and crew ==
Produced by Touchstone Television and Bad Robot, film production primarily took place in the greater Los Angeles area. Studio shooting primarily took place at the Walt Disney Studios in Burbank, California, along with some outdoor shots around Los Angeles, including in Griffith Park. The U.S. Bank Tower filled in for CIA headquarters. Despite its worldwide locales, only one episode was ever filmed outside the Los Angeles region, in Las Vegas, Nevada at the Aladdin Casino and Resort.

- J. J. Abrams – executive producer
- John Eisendrath – executive producer (Season 1–3)
- Alex Kurtzman – executive producer (Season 2–3)
- Roberto Orci – executive producer (Season 2–3)
- Jeffrey Bell – executive producer (Season 4–5)
- Jeff Pinkner – executive producer (Season 5)
- Jesse Alexander – executive producer (Season 5)

The series premiered the same month as the September 11 attacks. In an interview in advance of the show's release, Abrams told the New York Times that the show was not meant to be a realistic account of how the agency operates: "The truth can be inspiring and take you places, but I'm more interested in what I believe to be true and what works for the story than in doing a documentary on Langley procedure." He also said that he came up with the idea for the show while in the Felicity writers room, recalling, "Wouldn't it be really cool if Felicity were recruited by the C.I.A.? Then she'd find strength she didn't know she had and she wouldn't be able to tell her friends about it."

== Themes ==
- Family: Describing the family aspects of the show, Garner stated that Alias is about "this woman and her father and trying to figure out what is always a complicated relationship in the context of life and death at work."
- Prophecy: A good deal of Alias revolves around the prophecies of Milo Rambaldi. The viewer is first introduced to a prophecy about a woman who will "render the greatest power unto utter desolation". Later, as Sloane completes part of the Rambaldi prophecy he has received his own prophetic message. The Rambaldi storyline seemed to come to a close with the conclusion of Elena Derevko's endgame at the end of season four, but the fifth season introduced its own "prophet" (also in pursuit of Rambaldi) in the form of the mysterious organization known as Prophet Five, which ended up being a reference to Rambaldi and the final part of his endgame, immortality, which had been set up in the first season, though this was only one part of his plan. The first part was world peace, which Elena Derevko perverted and attempted in Season 4.
- Trust and betrayal: Much of the first three seasons of the show revolved around issues of trust and betrayal. Most obvious is the betrayal of Sydney by SD-6 which starts the show. However, the show includes numerous other examples of betrayal including Irina's betrayal of Jack, Sloane's betrayal of the Alliance, Sydney's betrayal of SD-6 and Sydney's lying to her friends. The first season can be viewed as a story of Sydney learning to trust her father and the second season can be viewed as Sydney struggling with trust issues relating to her mother.
- Clandestine operations: The government agencies that Sydney works for are conducting secret operations in various countries regularly. The same applies of course to the mentioned illegal agencies which are battled against. Those clandestine operations deal with collecting the sought-after Rambaldi artifacts, but also with aspects like illegal arms trade or blackmailing. To further their objectives, the CIA or APO, respectively, arrest criminals from other countries and bring them to interrogation facilities of the CIA.

== Costumes, hair, and wigs ==
Head Hair Designer Michael Reitz was nominated for Outstanding Hairstyling for a Series at the Emmys five years in a row (2002–2006); as well as three nominations and one win for "contemporary hair and makeup" at the Hollywood Makeup Artist and Hair Stylist Guild Awards.

Notable contributions to the hair stylist team include:

- Karen Bartek (3 Emmy Award nominations)
- Julie Woods (1 Emmy Award nomination)
- Grace Hernandez (1 Emmy Award nomination)
- Kathrine Rees (1 Emmy Award nomination)
- Yesmin Osman (1 Emmy Award nomination)
- Oogle Claire (0 nominations)

Alias was also known for the variety of its costumes. USA Today wrote that the show "features the most outrageous array of sexy costumes since Cher went off the air". Laura Goldsmith was the costume designer and she received one Costume Designers Guild Award nomination.

== Reception ==
=== Critical response ===
On review aggregator website Rotten Tomatoes, the first season has an approval rating of 84%, based on 37 reviews, with an average rating of 8.3/10. The site's critical consensus reads, "With dazzling action sequences, fine writing, and believable characters, Alias sets 'em up and knocks 'em down as solid escapist television, even if the narrative grows confusing at times." The second season holds an approval rating of 90%, based on 10 reviews, with an average rating of 8/10. The third season holds an approval rating of 83%, based on 6 reviews, with an average rating of 7.3/10. For the fourth season, 75% of 6 critics gave a positive review, with an average rating of 6.9/10. The site's critical consensus reads, "Alias enters its fourth season having seemingly run out of rabbits to pull out of the hat, but Jennifer Garner's charm and a whizz-bang sensibility keeps these spy games fun." The fifth season holds an approval rating of 100%, based on 7 reviews, with an average rating of 8.8/10.

The New York edition of Time Out listed the show in their top 50 TV shows of the decade 2000 – 2009. Alias also appeared in UGO.com's list of Top 50 TV Shows of All Time. In 2010, Kristin dos Santos of E! ranked it number 4 on her list, "Top 20 TV Series of the Past 20 Years".

=== U.S. television ratings ===
Seasonal rankings (based on average total viewers per episode) of Alias on ABC.

Season	Timeslot (Eastern & Pacific Time)	Season premiere	Season finale	TV season	Ranking	Viewers (in millions)
1	Sunday 9:00 PM (September 30, 2001 – May 12, 2002)	September 30, 2001	May 12, 2002	2001–2002	#60	9.7
2	Sunday 9:00 PM (September 29, 2002 – May 4, 2003)	September 29, 2002	May 4, 2003	2002–2003	#72	9.0
3	Sunday 9:00 PM (September 28, 2003 – May 23, 2004)	September 28, 2003	May 23, 2004	2003–2004	#78	8.2
4	Wednesday 9:00 PM (January 5, 2005 – May 25, 2005)	January 5, 2005	May 25, 2005	2004–2005	#37	10.3
5	Thursday 8:00 PM (September 29, 2005 – November 17, 2005) Wednesday 10:00 PM (December 7, 2005 – December 14, 2005) Wednesday 8:00 PM (April 19, 2006 – May 17, 2006) Monday 9:00 PM (May 22, 2006)	September 29, 2005	May 22, 2006	2005–2006	#90	6.7

The season 2 episode "Phase One" aired as a lead-out for Super Bowl XXXVII. Despite earning critical acclaim from USA Today, and achieving series-high ratings of 17.4 million viewers, it was unable to fully benefit from the post-Super Bowl time slot due to ABC airing a 40-minute post-game show (unusually long even by Super Bowl standards), which pushed its start time past 11:00 p.m. ET. The episode retained only 19 percent of the Super Bowl audience, and has the dubious distinction of earning the lowest overall ratings for a program airing after a Super Bowl since at least 1987, and the lowest rating ever (8.3 rating) in the age 18–49 demographic for a post-Super Bowl program, until Elementary in 2013.

Its ratings peak was reached in its fourth season, when ABC moved the program to Wednesday, in a 9:00 p.m. time slot following another (yet more successful) J. J. Abrams' drama, Lost, while airing the season's episodes in (almost) consecutive weeks beginning with the January 5, 2005, 2-hour season premiere (watched by 15.8 million viewers; the second most-watched episode in the series) and ending in May 2005. However, the fourth season was the only season in which this near-consecutive-week schedule was used, and the increase in audience numbers was minimal, as it faced competition from the results broadcasts of season 4 of American Idol, then nearing the peak of its popularity.

Coming off its most-watched season, Alias was moved to Thursdays at 8:00 p.m. in the fall of 2005 by ABC in an effort to invigorate the network's weak Thursday-night lineup. However, the move proved unsuccessful for the series, receiving the lowest viewership in the show's history. Alias became another scripted show in the history of ABC to not survive more than a year in this timeslot since Mork & Mindy was cancelled in 1982. In November 2005, ABC announced that the current fifth season of Alias would be its final one. ABC then temporarily aired Alias on Wednesdays at 10 p.m. in December, receiving the lead-in support of Lost.

The ABC network gave the show a 4-month hiatus (allowing Jennifer Garner to give birth to her first child); however, when it was brought back in April 2006, its new time slot was Wednesdays at 8:00 p.m. Notwithstanding, the viewer numbers still remained dismal, culminating in a 2-hour series finale airing on Monday, May 22, 2006 (broadcast against both the season finales of hit dramas, Fox's 24 and CBS' CSI: Miami) which attracted 6.68 million viewers. In comparison, the first season averaged 9.7 million viewers.

=== Awards and nominations ===
==== Awards won ====
Golden Globe Awards

- Best Performance by an Actress in a Television Series – Drama Jennifer Garner (2002)

Saturn Awards

- Best Network Television Series (2003)
- Best Actress in a Television Series Jennifer Garner (2003)
- Best Supporting Actor in a Television Series Victor Garber (2003)
- Cinescape Genre Female Face of the Future Melissa George (2004)

Screen Actors Guild Awards

- Outstanding Performance by a Female Actor in a Drama Series Jennifer Garner (2004)

==== Awards nominated ====
Emmy Awards

- Outstanding Lead Actress in a Drama Series Jennifer Garner (2002–2005)
- Outstanding Supporting Actor in a Drama Series Victor Garber (2002–2004)
- Outstanding Writing for a Drama Series (2002) J. J. Abrams
- Outstanding Supporting Actress in a Drama Series Lena Olin (2003)

Golden Globe Awards

- Best Television Series – Drama (2002)
- Best Performance by an Actress in a Television Series – Drama Jennifer Garner (2003–2005)

Saturn Awards

- Best Network Television Series (2004–2005)
- Best Actress in a Television Series Jennifer Garner (2004)
- Best Actor in a Television Series Michael Vartan (2004)
- Best Supporting Actor in a Television Series Victor Garber (2004)
- Best Actress on Television Jennifer Garner (2005–2006)

Screen Actors Guild

- Outstanding Performance by a Female Actor in a Drama Series Jennifer Garner (2003)

=== Cultural influence ===
In August 2003, the actual CIA enlisted Jennifer Garner to appear in a recruitment video, which would be shown at fairs and college campuses. A CIA officer said: "Jennifer and the character of Sydney Bristow both reflect a lot of the qualities we look for in new career field officers."

==== Parodies ====
The Alias production team has participated in at least two spoofs based upon the series and featuring cast members.

- The first was produced in 2002 for a segment of ABC's Monday Night Football in which Sydney (Jennifer Garner) is ordered by Sloane (Ron Rifkin) to infiltrate the locker room of the Washington Redskins NFL team in order to steal the coach's playbook. Syd disguises herself as a cheerleader and distracts the "Hogettes", a group of Redskins fans, with a glass of beer before stealing the book. Upon returning to SD-6 headquarters, she is horrified to find Sloane wearing a pig mask and oinking. This skit was advertised as being included in the season 2 DVD box set, but it was dropped from the set at the last minute, presumably due to copyright reasons. Another specially filmed MNF segment featuring Garner was included in the season 3 DVD set, but this was not, strictly speaking, a spoof.
- Another faux Alias "episode" was produced for a 2003 TV special celebrating the 50th anniversary of ABC. Featuring most of the regular cast of the series, the skit began with Jack Bristow preparing Sydney and Vaughn for a mission, and informing them that they will have a new partner – Detective Columbo (Peter Falk). Columbo, in his usual eccentric behavior, proceeds to wreak havoc at CIA headquarters, accidentally shooting Vaughn with an anesthetic dart and volunteering to wear a skimpy bikini intended for Sydney during the mission. Columbo reveals that his mission is not to aid the CIA but rather to help Walt Disney Company/ABC head Michael Eisner better understand the show. His work completed, Columbo departs, leaving Jack to utter a confused, "Dear God, that was strange."

Other spoofs and humorous references include:

- In an episode of Bradley Cooper's sitcom Kitchen Confidential, Michael Vartan guests as a rival French chef. Cooper's character makes a quip along the lines of, "it's almost like we used to work together".
- MADtv created a season 1 spoof.
- In episode 23 of Robot Chicken, the series is re-imagined with the part of Sydney being played by a killer whale ("Whalias"), complete with red hair and lipstick. The sketch features Sydney undercover in a glamorous party at SeaWorld, pretending to be a prize-winning cellist. A fight scene occurs in typical Alias style.
- In episode 57 of Kim Possible the characters (due to the use of a Pan-Dimension Vortex) find themselves appearing in various fictional television shows similar to the main plot point of the film Last Action Hero. Each of these television shows is clearly a spoof of a real-world television show. During one such "appearance", Kim lands in a night club where she is confronted by a character with bright red hair. The character orders Kim to "Tell me what I want to know." In response, Kim addresses the character as "Miss Tries Too Hard." and adds "Nice Wig." A brief Alias-like hand-to-hand fight sequence then ensues. The end of the segment involves characters talking about "The Device." In the context of the episode, the device is "The Pan-Dimensional Vortex Inducer", but asking about a "device" would also track with the plot of many Alias episodes.
- In episode 27 of Will Trent, another show produced for ABC, members of an online message board for Alias fans are tricked into thinking they have been recruited as CIA sleeper agents and given full immunity to assassinate targets. A running gag features several characters speaking enthusiastically about the show, getting swept up in their fandom and forgetting the seriousness of the crimes being committed.

== Reboot ==
In May 2010, E! Online's Kristin dos Santos reported that ABC was toying with the idea of rebooting Alias, but getting rid of the mythological Rambaldi elements to make the storylines more accessible for a mainstream audience. Subsequently, Entertainment Weekly columnist Michael Ausiello confirmed that ABC was in the early stages of developing a reboot, but that the potential series probably would not make it beyond the development phase.

== Merchandise ==
=== Soundtracks ===
Varèse Sarabande released a season one soundtrack containing 26 tracks. These tracks were used in the show, including the opening theme. All of them are composed by Michael Giacchino, except for the opening theme which was composed by J. J. Abrams. The tracks share a similar dance genre, however a few tracks, such as "In the Garden" share more of a slowed down tempo. A second soundtrack was also released containing music from the second season, but did not receive as much praise as the first soundtrack. A soundtrack for Alias: The Video Game, composed by Chris Tilton (who also provided additional music for later episodes of the TV series), was also released, but can only be downloaded online.

The original soundtrack was removed from the versions of the show available on streaming services such as Tubi. DVDs appear to have the original soundtrack on them.

=== Video game ===
The video game Alias, based on the series, is a third-person stealth action title developed and released by Acclaim Entertainment for the PC, PlayStation 2 and Xbox. The plot was written by the creators of the show and the game features the voices of the cast principals. It was released on April 6, 2004, and has a rating of T for Teen. The game is set between episodes 19 and 20 of season 2. The game allows the player to be Sydney (and briefly on one mission Vaughn), and sends her on various missions to many different locations. The missions become more difficult as players come closer to finishing the game. It includes many spy skills that Sydney uses in the show.

Prior to the Acclaim release, ABC Television produced an episodic downloadable video game, Alias: Underground, which is available through ABC's website. The game was a 3D third-person stealth action game much like the Acclaim production, with missions released monthly during the original broadcast of the TV show's second season.

=== Original novels ===
A number of original novels based upon the series have been published, primarily for a teenage reading audience. Due to the intricate and story arc-based nature of the series, most novels published to date have been prequels to the series, some focusing on Sydney in her early missions for SD-6, and others focusing on Vaughn's missions before meeting her. Their canon status with regards to the televised series has yet to be determined. Although aimed at young readers, the books tackle serious subject matter, such as one volume which details the first time Sydney kills someone.

1. Recruited – Lynn Mason (2002) ISBN 0-553-49398-1
2. A Secret Life – Laura Peyton Roberts (2003) ISBN 0-553-49399-X
3. Disappeared – Lynn Mason (2003) ISBN 0-553-49400-7
4. Sister Spy – Laura Peyton Roberts (2003) ISBN 0-553-49401-5
5. The Pursuit – Elizabeth Skurnick (2003) ISBN 0-553-49402-3
6. Close Quarters – Emma Harrison (2003) ISBN 0-553-49403-1
7. Father Figure – Laura Peyton Roberts (2003) ISBN 0-553-49404-X
8. Free Fall – Christa Roberts (2004) ISBN 0-553-49405-8
9. Infiltration – Breen Frazier (2004) ISBN 0-553-49437-6
10. Vanishing Act – Sean Gerace (2004) ISBN 0-553-49438-4
11. Skin Deep – Cathy Hapka (2004) ISBN 0-553-49439-2
12. Shadowed – Elizabeth Skurnick (2004) ISBN 0-553-49440-6

The second series of novels, titled "The APO Series", fit into the season four timeframe and are published by Simon Spotlight Entertainment.

1. Two of a Kind? – Greg Cox (April 26, 2005) ISBN 1-4169-0213-9
2. Faina – Rudy Gaborno, Chris Hollier (April 26, 2005) ISBN 1-4169-0245-7
3. Collateral Damage – Pierce Askegren (June 28, 2005) ISBN 1-4169-0247-3
4. Replaced – Emma Harrison (July 26, 2005) ISBN 1-4169-0246-5
5. The Road Not Taken – Greg Cox (October 4, 2005) ISBN 1-4169-0248-1
6. Vigilance – Paul Ruditis (December 6, 2005) ISBN 1-4169-0928-1
7. Strategic Reserve – Christina F. York (March 7, 2006) ISBN 1-4169-0946-X
8. Once Lost – Kirsten Beyer (April 25, 2006) ISBN 1-4169-0947-8
9. Namesakes – Greg Cox (July 11, 2006) ISBN 1-4169-2442-6
10. Old Friends – Steven Hanna (September 2006) ISBN 1-4169-2443-4
11. The Ghost – Brian Studler (November 2006) ISBN 1-4169-2444-2
12. Mind Games – Paul Ruditis (December 2006) ISBN 1-4169-2445-0
13. A Touch of Death – Christina York (December 2006) ISBN 1-4169-2446-9

=== Trading cards ===
Inkworks released the official trading cards for the series. Season One was published in 2002, Season Two in 2003, Season Three in 2004, and Season 4 in 2006. Each release included a full set of base cards and various inserts, including autographs and memorabilia from the cast.

=== Comic books ===
Planned comic book tie-ins were supposed to be released by Rob Liefeld's Arcade Comics, but it was scrapped before publishing any issues.
