= List of Full Moon Features productions =

This is a list of all films produced by Full Moon Features. Note that this does not include any films that were produced by Charles Band prior to the creation of Full Moon, even though Full Moon now distributes some of them, such as Trancers. For a list of these pre-Full Moon productions, see Empire Pictures filmography.

== Full Moon ==
=== Full Moon Productions Series ===
- Puppet Master (1989)
- Meridian: Kiss of the Beast (1990)
- Shadowzone (1990)

=== Full Moon Entertainment Series ===
- Crash and Burn (1990)
- Puppet Master II (1990)
- Dollman (1991)
- The Pit and the Pendulum (1991)
- Puppet Master III: Toulon's Revenge (1991)
- Subspecies (1991)
- Trancers II (1991)
- Bad Channels (1992)
- Demonic Toys (1992)
- Doctor Mordrid (1992)
- Netherworld (1992)
- Seedpeople (1992)
- Trancers III (1992)
- Arcade (1993)
- Bloodstone: Subspecies II (1993)
- Dollman vs. Demonic Toys (1993)
- Invisible: The Chronicles of Benjamin Knight (1993)
- Mandroid (1993)
- Puppet Master 4 (1993)
- Robot Wars (1993)
- Bloodlust: Subspecies III (1994)
- Dark Angel: The Ascent (1994)
- Lurking Fear (1994)
- Oblivion (1994)
- Puppet Master 5 (1994)
- Shrunken Heads (1994)
- Trancers 4: Jack of Swords (1994)
- Trancers 5: Sudden Deth (1994)
- Castle Freak (1995)
- Demon in the Bottle (1996)
- Oblivion 2: Backlash (1996)

=== Full Moon Studios Series ===
- Vampire Journals (1997)

=== Full Moon Pictures Series ===
- Alien Abduction: Intimate Secrets (1996)
- Head of the Family (1996)
- Petticoat Planet (1996)
- The Creeps (1997)
- Hideous! (1997)
- Curse of the Puppet Master (1998)
- Shrieker (1998)
- Subspecies 4: Bloodstorm (1998)
- Talisman (1998)
- Blood Dolls (1999)
- The Boy with the X-Ray Eyes (1999)
- The Incredible Genie (1999)
- The Killer Eye (1999)
- Retro Puppet Master (1999)
- Totem (1999)
- Witchouse (1999)
- The Dead Hate the Living! (2000)
- Killjoy (2000) (Co-production with Big City Pictures)
- Prison of the Dead (2000)
- Sideshow (2000)
- Voodoo Academy (2000)
- Witchouse II: Blood Coven (2000)
- Demonicus (2001)
- Horrorvision (2001)
- Vampire Resurrection (2001)
- Witchouse 3: Demon Fire (2001)
- Groom Lake (2002)
- Hell Asylum (2002)
- Jigsaw (2002)
- Killjoy 2: Deliverance from Evil (2002) (Co-production with Big City Pictures and Tempe Entertainment)
- Speck (2002)
- Trancers 6 (2002)

=== Full Moon Features Series ===
- Birth Rite (2003)
- Darkwalker (2003)
- Deadly Stingers (2003)
- Delta Delta Die! (2003)
- Puppet Master: The Legacy (2003)
- Dr. Moreau's House of Pain (2004)
- Tomb of Terror (2004)
- The Baker's Dozen (2005)
- Decadent Evil (2005) (Co-production with Wizard Entertainment)
- Doll Graveyard (2005)
- The Gingerdead Man (2005) (Co-production with Talos Entertainment)
- Horrific (2005)
- Monsters Gone Wild! (2005)
- The Possessed (2005)
- Urban Evil (2005) (Segment: The Horrible Dr. Bones, Ragdoll and The Vault)
- When Puppets and Dolls Attack (2005) (Co-production with Wizard Entertainment; Archivals of Puppet Master and Demonic Toys)
- Aliens Gone Wild (2005)
- Evil Bong (2006) (Co-production with Talos Entertainment)
- Petrified (2006)
- Dangerous Worry Dolls (2007)
- Dead Man's Hand (2007)
- Decadent Evil II (2007)
- Deadly End (2008)
- Gingerdead Man 2: Passion of the Crust (2008)
- Evil Bong 2: King Bong (2009)
- Skull Heads (2009)
- Demonic Toys 2 (2010) (Co-production with Trainsition Entertainment)
- Killjoy 3 (2010)
- Puppet Master: Axis of Evil (2010)
- Evil Bong 3D: The Wrath of Bong (2011)
- Gingerdead Man 3: Saturday Night Cleaver (2011) (Co-production with Trainsition Entertainment)
- The Dead Want Women (2012)
- DevilDolls (2012) (Segment: Ragdoll, Doll Graveyard and Demonic Toys)
- Killer Eye: Halloween Haunt (2012)
- Killjoy Goes to Hell (2012)
- Puppet Master X: Axis Rising (2012)
- Gingerdead Man vs. Evil Bong (2013)
- Ooga Booga (2013)
- Unlucky Charms (2013)
- The Dead Reborn (2013)
- Trophy Heads (2014)
- Evil Bong 420 (2015)
- Evil Bong: High-5! (2016)
- Killjoy's Psycho Circus (2016)
- Ravenwolf Towers (2016)
- Evil Bong 666 (2017)
- Puppet Master: Axis Termination (2017)
- Evil Bong 777 (2018)
- Necropolis: Legion (2019)
- Weedjies: Halloweed Night (2019)
- Barbie & Kendra Save the Tiger King (2020)
- Barbie & Kendra Storm Area 51 (2020)
- Corona Zombies (2020)
- Femalien: Cosmic Crush (2020)
- Blade: The Iron Cross (2020)
- Baby Oopsie (2021)
- Cassex (2021)
- Don't Let Her In (2021)
- The Gingerweed Man (2021)
- The Resonator: Miskatonic U (2021)
- The Seduction of Rose Parrish (2021)
- 12 Slays of Christmas (2022)
- Attack of the 50 foot Cam Girl (2022)
- Baby Oopsie 2: Murder Dolls (2022)
- Baby Oopsie 3: Burn Baby Burn! (2022)
- Evil Bong 888: Infinity High (2022)
- Famous T&A 2 (2022)
- Femalien: Starlight Saga (2022)
- Giantess Battle Attack (2022)
- Piranha Women (2022)
- Puppet Master: Doktor Death (2022)
- Sorority Babes in the Slimeball Bowl-O-Rama 2 (2022)
- Demonic Toys: Jack-Attack (2023)
- Murderbot (2023)
- The Primevals (2023)
- Subspecies V: Blood_Rise (2023)
- Barbie & Kendra Crash Joe Bob's Drive-in Jamboree (2024)
- Dungeons of Ecstasy (2025)
- Prompt (2025)
- Autonomous (2026)
- Buried Secrets (2026)
- The Grim Rapper (2026)
- Head of the Family 2: Sirens of Seduction (2026)
- Models vs. Werewolves (2026)
- Robotica (2026)
- Barbenheimer (TBA)

== Sub-labels ==
=== Moonbeam Entertainment ===
- Prehysteria! (1993)
- Remote (1993)
- Beanstalk (1994)
- Dragonworld (1994)
- Pet Shop (1994)
- Prehysteria! 2 (1994)
- Josh Kirby... Time Warrior: Chapter 1, Planet of the Dino-Knights (1995)
- Josh Kirby... Time Warrior: Chapter 2, the Human Pets (1995)
- Josh Kirby... Time Warrior: Chapter 3, Trapped on Toyworld (1995)
- Josh Kirby... Time Warrior: Chapter 4, Eggs from 70 Million B.C. (1995)
- Leapin’ Leprechauns! (1995)
- Magic Island (1995)
- Prehysteria! 3 (1995)
- Josh Kirby... Time Warrior: Chapter 5, Journey to the Magic Cavern (1996)
- Josh Kirby... Time Warrior: Chapter 6, Last Battle for the Universe (1996)
- Spellbreaker: Secret of the Leprechauns (1996)
- Magic in the Mirror (1996)
- Magic in the Mirror: Fowl Play (1997)
- Mystery Monsters aka Goobers (1997)
- Johnny Mysto: Boy Wizard (1997 Video)
- The Secret Kingdom (1998)
- The Shrunken City (1998)
- Clockmaker aka Timekeeper (1998 TV film)
- The Search for the Jewel of Polaris: Mysterious Museum (1999)
- Phantom Town (1999 Video)
- Aliens in the Wild, Wild West (1999 Video)
- Shapeshifter aka Shifter (1999)
- Teenage Space Vampires (1999)
- Planet Patrol (1999 Video)
- Teen Sorcery (1999 Video)
- Teen Knight aka Medieval Park (1999 TV film)
- The Boy with the X-Ray Eyes (1999)
- Excalibur Kid (1999 Video)
- Task Force 2001 (2000 Video)

=== Torchlight Entertainment ===
- Beach Babes from Beyond (1993)
- Test Tube Teens from the Year 2000 (1994)
- Beach Babes 2: Cave Girl Island (1995)
- Blonde Heaven (1995)
- Huntress: Spirit of the Night (1996)
- Petticoat Planet (1996)
- Lurid Tales: The Castle Queen (1997)

=== Monster Island Entertainment ===
- Zarkorr! The Invader (1996)
- Kraa! The Sea Monster (1998)

=== Filmonsters! ===
- Frankenstein Reborn! (1998)
- The Werewolf Reborn! (1998)

=== Alchemy Entertainment/Big City Pictures ===
- Ragdoll (1999)
- The Horrible Dr. Bones (2000)
- The Vault (2001) (Co-production with Tempe Entertainment)
- Cryptz (2002)

=== Edge Entertainment ===
- Freeway II: Confessions of a Trickbaby (1999)
- Dying to Get Rich! (2000)
- Gun: Fatal Betrayal (2000)

=== Delirium Films ===
- It Knows You're Alone (2021)
- Scream of the Blind Dead (2021)

=== Shadow Entertainment ===
- Bleed (2002)

=== Pulp Noir ===
- Quadrant (2024)
- Death Streamer (2024)

[4]

=== Wizard Studios ===
- Vampie (2011)
- Villanelle (2012)
- Virginia Obscura (2014)
