= Stoner film =

Subgenre of comedy films

Stoner film is a subgenre of comedy film based on marijuana themes, where recreational use often drives the plot, sometimes representing cannabis culture more broadly or intended for that audience.

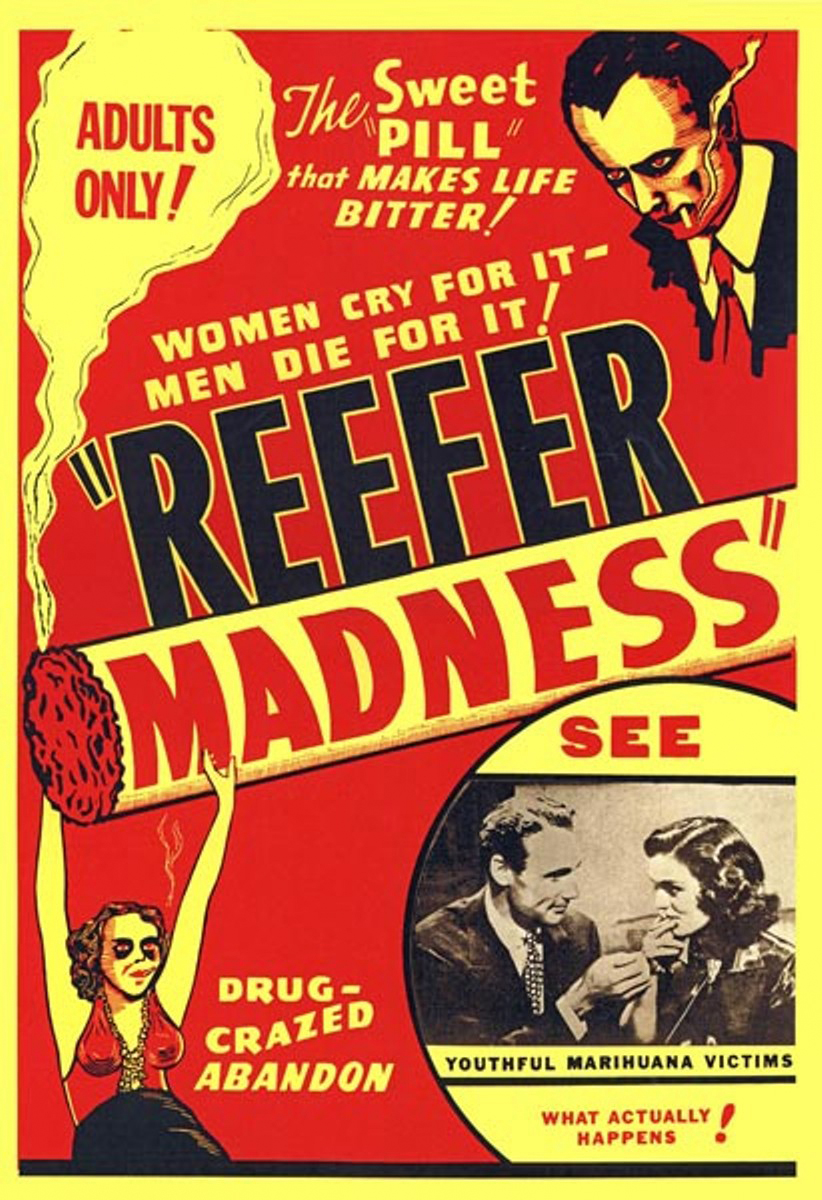
Reefer Madness (1936), one of the first stoner films

== Genre ==
The midnight movie scene in theaters of the 1970s revived the hectoring anti-drug propaganda film Reefer Madness (1936) as an ironic counterculture comedy. The broad popularity of Reefer Madness led to a new audience for extreme anti-drug films bordering on self-parody, including Assassin of Youth (1937), Marihuana (1936), and She Shoulda Said No! a.k.a. The Devil's Weed (1949).

The duo Cheech & Chong established the archetypal "stoner" comedy throughout the 1970s, taking their antics to the big screen for Up in Smoke in 1978, establishing the contemporary stoner film genre.

High Times magazine, founded in 1974, began sponsoring the first Stony Awards in 2000, celebrating stoner films and television, recognizing a broad scope of noteworthy cannabis media.

The enduring influence of Reefer Madness led to a musical comedy remake in 2005.

== Common elements ==
Many stoner movies have certain elements and themes in common. The template involves protagonists who have marijuana, are attempting to find marijuana, or have some other task to complete. The protagonists are often two friends in a variation of the buddy film.

Stoner films often involve evading authority figures who disapprove of the protagonists' marijuana usage, usually out of a greater lack of acceptance of their lifestyle of leisure and innocence. Authority figures are often law-enforcement agents, who are portrayed as comically inept, as well as parents, co-workers, friends, and security guards. Most serious moments in stoner films are intended ironically, often to parody overwrought counterparts in mainstream cinema. The comic story arcs often approach or fall over the line into slapstick.

== List of stoner films ==
- Jewel Robbery (1932)
- Reefer Madness (1936)
- I Love You, Alice B. Toklas (1968)
- Easy Rider (1969)
- Beyond the Valley of the Dolls (1970)
- Fritz the Cat (1972)
- The Nine Lives of Fritz the Cat (1974)
- Acapulco Gold (1976)
- The Chicken Chronicles (1977)
- Animal House (1978)
- Rockers (1978)
- Up in Smoke (1978)
- Cheech & Chong's Next Movie (1980)
- Cheech & Chong's Nice Dreams (1981)
- Fast Times at Ridgemont High (1982)
- Things Are Tough All Over (1982)
- Still Smokin' (1983)
- Class of Nuke 'Em High (1986)
- Les Frères Pétard (1986)
- Far Out Man (1990)
- London Kills Me (1991)
- Dazed and Confused (1993)
- Clerks (1994)
- PCU (1994)
- The Stoned Age (1994)
- Friday (1995)
- Mallrats (1995)
- Bio-Dome (1996)
- Don't Be a Menace to South Central While Drinking Your Juice in the Hood (1996)
- Bongwater (1997)
- The Big Lebowski (1998)
- Dead Man on Campus (1998)
- Fear and Loathing in Las Vegas (1998)
- Half Baked (1998)
- Homegrown (1998)
- Detroit Rock City (1999)
- Freak Talks About Sex (1999)
- Human Traffic (1999)
- Idle Hands (1999)
- Outside Providence (1999)
- Scarfies (1999)
- Dude, Where's My Car? (2000)
- Next Friday (2000)
- Saving Grace (2000)
- Scary Movie (2000)
- How High (2001)
- Jay and Silent Bob Strike Back (2001)
- Lammbock (2001)
- Scary Movie 2 (2001)
- Super Troopers (2001)
- The Wash (2001)
- Wet Hot American Summer (2001)
- Ali G Indahouse (2002)
- Friday After Next (2002)
- High Times' Potluck (2002)
- My Dinner with Jimi (2002)
- Slackers (2002)
- Feuer, Eis & Dosenbier (2002)
- Van Wilder (2002)
- Rolling Kansas (2003)
- Leprechaun: Back 2 tha Hood (2003)
- Scary Movie 3 (2003)
- Harold & Kumar Go to White Castle (2004)
- Soul Plane (2004)
- Without a Paddle (2004)
- Reefer Madness: The Movie Musical (2005)
- Clerks II (2006)
- Grandma's Boy (2006)
- Scary Movie 4 (2006)
- Trailer Park Boys: The Movie (2006)
- Van Wilder: The Rise of Taj (2006)
- Evil Bong (2006)
- Knocked Up (2007)
- Kush (2007)
- Remember the Daze (2007)
- Smiley Face (2007)
- Walk Hard: The Dewey Cox Story (2007)
- Weirdsville (2007)
- Harold & Kumar Escape from Guantanamo Bay (2008)
- Humboldt County (2008)
- Pineapple Express (2008)
- Strange Wilderness (2008)
- The Wackness (2008)
- Eat Me! (2009)
- Extract (2009)
- Stan Helsing (2009)
- Stone Bros. (2009)
- Van Wilder: Freshman Year (2009)
- Trailer Park Boys: Countdown to Liquor Day (2009)
- Evil Bong 2: King Bong (2009)
- Due Date (2010)
- High School (2010)
- Leaves of Grass (2010)
- A Very Harold & Kumar Christmas (2011)
- Anuvahood (2011)
- High Road (2011)
- Jeff, Who Lives at Home (2011)
- Our Idiot Brother (2011)
- Paul (2011)
- Stonerville (2011)
- Evil Bong 3D: The Wrath of Bong (2011)
- Easy Rider: The Ride Back (2012)
- Liberal Arts (2012)
- Mac & Devin Go to High School (2012)
- The Newest Pledge (2012)
- Ted (2012)
- A Haunted House (2013)
- Cheech & Chong's Animated Movie (2013)
- Gingerdead Man vs. Evil Bong (2013)
- Go Goa Gone (2013)
- Idukki Gold (2013)
- Kili Poyi (2013)
- Hansel & Gretel Get Baked (2013)
- Honey Bee (2013)
- Scary Movie 5 (2013)
- This Is the End (2013)
- We're the Millers (2013)
- A Haunted House 2 (2014)
- The Coed and the Zombie Stoner (2014)
- Kid Cannabis (2014)
- Trailer Park Boys: Don't Legalize It (2014)
- The Night Before (2015)
- Ted 2 (2015)
- Evil Bong 420 (2015)
- Midnight Delight (2016)
- Jil Jung Juk (2016)
- Sausage Party (2016)
- Evil Bong High-5! (2016)
- Grow House (2017)
- Hot Summer Nights (2017)
- Evil Bong 666 (2017)
- Dude (2018)
- Super Troopers 2 (2018)
- Evil Bong 777 (2018)
- The Beach Bum (2019)
- The Gentlemen (2019)
- How High 2 (2019)
- Jay and Silent Bob Reboot (2019)
- The Marijuana Conspiracy (2020)
- The Gingerweed Man (2021)
- Clerks III (2022)
- Good Mourning (2022)
- Evil Bong 888: Infinity High (2022)
- Ebony & Ivory (2024)
- Half Baked: Totally High (2024)
- Okay, I’m Reloaded! (2025)
- Pizza Movie (2026)
- Scary Movie 6 (2026)
- Super Troopers 3 (2026)
- The Wrong Girls (2026)

== Stoner crossover films ==
- The Harder They Come (1972), stoner crime film
- The Big Lebowski (1998), stoner crime comedy film
- Grass: History of Marijuana (1999), stoner documentary
- Scarfies (1999), stoner crime black comedy
- Deuce Bigalow: European Gigolo (2005), stoner sex comedy
- Puff, Puff, Pass (2006), stoner crime film
- The Tripper (2006), stoner slasher film
- Super High Me (2007), stoner documentary
- The Union: The Business Behind Getting High (2007), stoner documentary
- Sex Pot (2009), stoner sex comedy
- Mr. Nice (2010), stoner crime film
- Your Highness (2011), stoner comic fantasy
- Bong of the Dead (2011), stoner horror film
- Paulette (2012), stoner crime film
- Savages (2012), stoner crime film
- The Culture High (2014), stoner documentary
- Inherent Vice (2014), stoner crime film
- Mile High: The Comeback of Cannabis (2014), stoner documentary
- Halloweed (2016), stoner horror film
- Grass Is Greener (2019), stoner documentary
- The Smoke Master (2022), stoner kung fu film
- Untitled Snoop Dogg biography (2027?), stoner biopic

== See also ==
- Cannabis culture
- List of drug films
- Psychedelic film
- Television series about cannabis
