= Hambo (disambiguation) =

Hambo is a traditional dance that originated in Sweden.

Hambo may also refer to:

- Hambo, a character in the film Gikor
- Hambo, a character in the film Karo
- Hambo, a character in the animated cartoon Weebl and Bob
- Hambo, a puppet in the animated series Adventure Time episodes "Sky Witch" and "Betty"
- Hambo the Clown, a character in the films Evil Bong and Gingerdead Man vs. Evil Bong
- Matthew "Hambo" Hampson (born 1984), an English former rugby union prop
- Vahid Hambo (born 1995), a Finnish footballer
