= Robin Sydney =

American actress

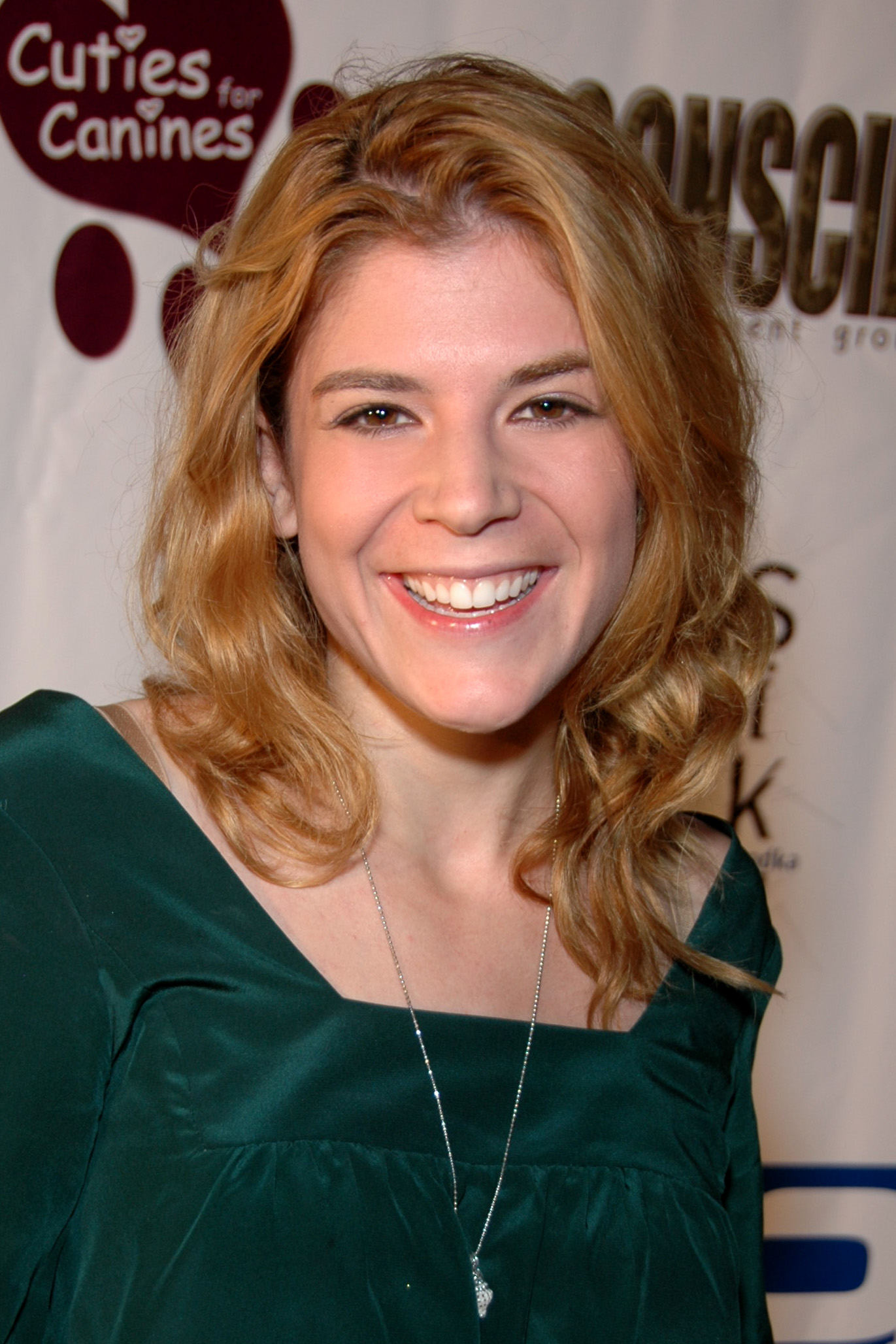
- Sydney in November 2007
- Born: Robin Sydney Heymsfield; Boulder, Colorado, U.S.
- Occupation: Actress
- Years active: 1992–present
- Spouse: Charles Band (m. 2023)
- Website: www.robinsydney.net

Robin Sydney (born Robin Sydney Heymsfield) is an American actress.

== Career ==
Sydney began acting at the age of eight in local theater in her hometown of Boulder, Colorado. At age seventeen, she moved to Hollywood with her mother to pursue a screen acting career.

She appeared in the television series ER, Drake & Josh, Oliver Beene, Masters of Horror, The Brotherhood of Poland, New Hampshire, Femme Fatales and Chemistry. She has also appeared in the Charles Band-directed films The Gingerdead Man, Evil Bong, Dead Man's Hand, Evil Bong 2: King Bong, Skull Heads and Evil Bong 3D: The Wrath of Bong.

Besides acting, Sydney along with her mother Marian Heymsfield created the company Zorbitz in 2003. Through the Zorbitz company they sell a number of children's products in which they donate a portion of each sale to charities worldwide.

== Personal life ==
Sydney met filmmaker Charles Band on the set of his 2004 film The Gingerdead Man, they dated for 17 years and she was cast in several acting roles in his films during that time. They became engaged on December 9, 2022 and then married exactly a year later. Sydney is the stepmother of Band's four children from his two previous marriages, one of whom is Band's son Alex Band, the lead vocalist of the band The Calling.

== Filmography ==
=== Film ===
Year	Title	Role	Notes
2002	Coming Clean	Dena	Short film
2002	Colour Blind	(unknown)	
2003	Sticky Fingers	Teen Girl #1	Short film
2005	The Baker's Dozen	Sarah Leigh	Short film
2005	The Gingerdead Man	Sarah Leigh	
2006	The Lost	Katherine Wallace	
2006	Cattle Call	Auditioner #9	
2006	Big Bad Wolf	Melissa	
2006	Evil Bong	Luann	
2007	Dead Man's Hand	JJ	
2008	Wicked Lake	Ilene	
2008	Garden Party	Sara	
2009	Angels	Charlotte	Short film
2009	Evil Bong 2: King Bong	Luann	
2009	Skull Heads	Naomi	
2011	Evil Bong 3D: The Wrath of Bong	Luann	
2011	Gingerdead Man 3: Saturday Night Cleaver	Robyn	
2012	Night of the Living Dead 3D: Re-Animation	DyeAnne	
2012	The Dead Want Women	Woman in Pearls	
2012	FDR: American Badass!	Missy	
2012	American Muscle	Darling	
2013	Gingerdead Man vs. Evil Bong	Sarah Leigh, Luann	
2015	Evil Bong 420	Sarah Leigh	
2016	Evil Bong High-5!	Sarah Leigh	
2016	Killjoy's Psycho Circus	Luann / Faux Batty Boop	Character credited as 'Luanne'
2017	Evil Bong 666	Luann / Faux Batty Boop	
2017	Puppet Master: Axis Termination	Bar Patroness	
2018	Evil Bong 777	Luann / Faux Batty Boop	
2019	Weedjies: Halloweed Night	Party Guest	
2019	Bunker of Blood: Chapter 8: Butcher's Bake Off: Hell's Kitchen	Molly	
2020	Corona Zombies	Kendra	
2020	Barbie & Kendra Save The Tiger King	Kendra	
2020	Barbie & Kendra Storm Area 51	Kendra	
2022	Evil Bong 888: Infinity High	Kendra	

=== Television ===
Year	Title	Role	Notes
2001–2002	The Andy Dick Show	Shy Girl / Teen Girl	Episodes: "Andy's Angels", "Reunited"
2003	ER	Sasha	Episode: "No Strings Attached"
2003	The Brotherhood of Poland, New Hampshire	Maddie Morris	Episode: "Little Girl Lost"
2004	Oliver Beene	Daughter Novogroder	Episode: "Dibs"
2004–2007	Drake & Josh	Jackie	Recurring role
2005	Freddie	Marissa	Episode: "The Italian Job"
2007	Masters of Horror	Trish	Episode: "Right to Die"
2007	CSI: Crime Scene Investigation	Miss Palermo	Episode: "Big Shots"
2008	Merry Christmas, Drake & Josh	Jackie	Television film
2011	Femme Fatales	Lindsey Brickman	Episode: "The Clinic"
2011	Chemistry	Casey	Episodes: "Lust in Translation", "In or Out, Part 2"
