= Dead Man's Hand (2007 film) =

- Directed by: Charles Band
- Written by: August White
- Starring: Wes Armstrong; Sid Haig; Michael Berryman
- Cinematography: Terrance Ryker
- Music by: District 78
- Distributed by: Full Moon Features
- Release date: July 2007
- Running time: 81 minutes
- Country: United States
- Language: English

Dead Man's Hand (sometimes known as The Haunted Casino) is a 2007 American horror film directed by Charles Band. It follows a group of survivors going on a road trip to Las Vegas when they found an abandoned casino that became haunted.

== Plot ==
After inheriting a casino from his dead uncle, Matthew Dragna, his girl friend J.J. (Robin Sydney) and a group of friends take a road trip to the outskirts of Las Vegas, where they find the run-down Mysteria Casino. But the trip takes a frightening turn when the kids discover that the casino is haunted by the ghosts of Vegas mobsters Roy "The Word" Donahue (Sid Haig) and his goon Gil Wachetta (Michael Berryman), looking to settle an old score. Matthew and J.J. must fight for their very souls as the ghosts seek their gruesome vengeance, and in the vein of The Shining, this horrifying tale builds to a bloody and surprising climax.

== Cast ==
- Wes Armstrong as Jim "Jimbo"
- Michael Berryman as Gil Wachetta
- Kristyn Green as Paige
- Sid Haig as Roy "The Word" Donahue
- Kristopher Logan as Roulette Dealer (credited as Jack Maturin)
- Jessica Morris as Melissa
- Lily Rains as Emily
- Kavan Reece as "Skeeter"
- Bob Rumnock as Sam
- Rico Simonini as Blackjack Dealer
- Robin Sydney as J.J.
- Scott Whyte as Matthew Dragna
