= Amy Paffrath =

American television presenter and actress

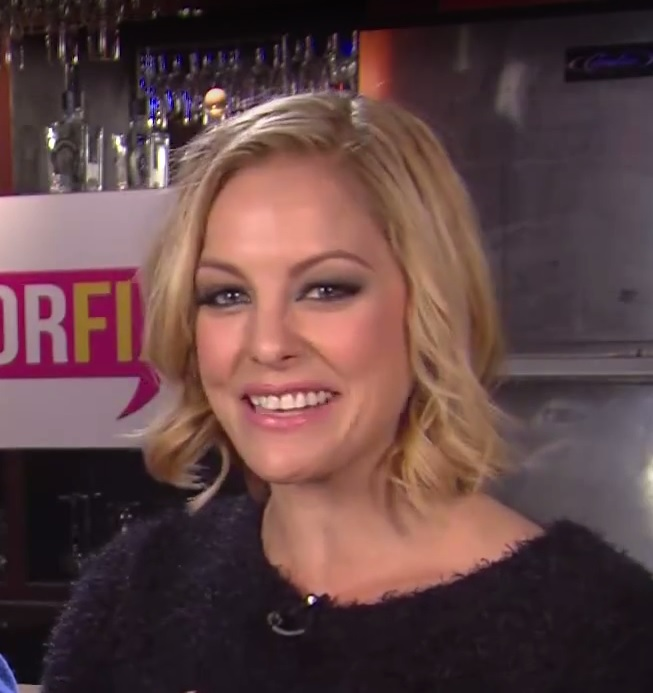
- Paffrath in 2015
- Occupations: Television presenter; actress
- Years active: 2006–present
- Spouse: Drew Seeley (m. 2013)
- Children: 1

Amy Paffrath is an American television presenter and actress.

== Early life ==
Paffrath earned her degree in Broadcast Journalism in 2005. She moved to Los Angeles in early 2006.

== Career ==
=== Hosting ===
From 2006 to 2007, Paffrath performed on-air reporting for Created by U and In the Mix, both on DirecTV. In early 2007, she hosted her own pop culture news show, Broadcaster News on broadcaster.com. Paffrath served as the longtime host of E! News Now; a red carpet correspondent for TV Guide's Hollywood 411; was a series regular on MSN's The Big Debate, and guest hosted on G4's Attack of the Show! and Fuel TV's The Daily Habit.

Paffrath hosted MTV’s Jersey Shore: After Hours and seasons 4-6 of Jersey Shore: Reunion. She appeared on The Girl Spot on BiteSize TV. Paffrath was a red carpet correspondent for Yahoo! Movies. She hosted Top Story! Weekly on Improv Olympics; and seasons one and two of the reality series, Dating Naked, on VH1. In 2015, Paffrath hosted the Mid-America Emmy Awards.

=== Acting ===
Paffrath appeared in the films Moonlight on Ivy (2006), Fly Kidz (2006), and Dinner at Eight (2007), and played the lead in Huntsville (2007). She starred in Paramore's music video, "Misery Business", and Whitestarr's "Sunshine Girl".

Paffrath has acted in the American sitcoms Hot in Cleveland, Sullivan & Son, and 2 Broke Girls. In 2014, she appeared in the American film The Purge: Anarchy.

=== Spokesmodel ===
Paffrath is the spokesmodel for Sibu Beauty Products. She plays "Mayday Amy" in the Amazon Kindle "Fire" commercial campaign.

== Personal life ==
In April 2013, Paffrath married actor and singer Drew Seeley. They have a daughter, born in July 2019.

== Filmography ==
=== Film ===
Year	Title	Role	Notes
2007	Dinner at Eight	Molly-Sue	Short film
2007	Hauntsville	Tammy	
2008	Shadow on the Wall		Short film
2009	Fired Up!	3rd Row Brunette	Uncredited
2009	Fun with War Crimes	Nurse	Short film
2009	The Pit and the Pendulum	Gemma	
2009	Deep in the Valley	Sorority Girl	Uncredited
2012	Stockholm	Qara	Short film
2014	Dumbbells	Female Cop	
2014	The Purge: Anarchy	TV Newscaster	
2015	Freshwater	Kim Whitley	
2016	Do Over	Angela Weiss	
2016	The Thinning	Wendy Banks	
2018	The Thinning: New World Order	Wendy Banks	

=== Television ===
Year	Title	Role	Channel
2009	Attack of the Show!	Herself	G4
2009	Evil Bong 2: King Bong	Velicity	
2009	I Kissed a Vampire	Luna Dark	
2010	The Defenders	Field Reporter	CBS
2010	The Daily 10	Correspondent	E! News
2011	Hollywood 411	Correspondent	TV Guide
2011	The Daily Habit	Guest Host	Fuel TV
2011	Evil Bong 3D: The Wrath of Bong	Velicity	
2011–2012	Jersey Shore	Host	MTV
2012	Oh Fuck, It's You	Mia	CBS
2012	War Bride	Nicole	
2012	Husband & Wife	The Wife	
2012	Hot in Cleveland	LA Actress	TV Land
2013	BK Comedy Series	Writer, director, producer	
2013	Gingerdead Man vs. Evil Bong	Velicity	
2013	Sullivan & Son	Kathy	TBS
2013	Hollywood Minute		BiteSize TV
2 Broke Girls	York	CBS	
2014	The Breaks	Vanessa	
2014–2015	Dating Naked	Host	VH1
2016	Evil Bong: High 5	Velicity	
