= Gingerdead Man vs. Evil Bong =

2013 film directed by Charles Band

- Release poster
- Directed by: Charles Band
- Screenplay by: Kent Roudebush
- Story by: Charles Band
- Produced by: Charles Band; Nakai Nelson
- Starring: Robin Sydney; Tian Wang; Mindy Robinson
- Cinematography: Howard Wexler
- Music by: William Levine
- Production companies: Full Moon Features; Côla Pictures
- Distributed by: Full Moon Features; Shower Film Groups
- Release date: October 29, 2013 (United States)
- Running time: 80 minutes
- Country: United States
- Language: English

Gingerdead Man vs. Evil Bong is a 2013 American crossover horror comedy film produced by Full Moon Features, about a battle between the namesake characters from two film series, The Gingerdead Man and Evil Bong. The film was released October 29, 2013, on the Full Moon Features website as streaming video, with wider release November 12, 2013.

== Synopsis ==
The Gingerdead Man is on a tropical island. He ruminates on killing Sarah Leigh but does not know where she is. A newspaper blows by with information on Sarah’s upcoming “Bake off” and he starts planning her demise.

Larnell now owns and operates “Dick’s Head Shop” with girlfriend Velicity, and they briefly recount the events of the first three Evil Bong films in passing. Larnell is dealing with two prospective buyers when Hambo the Clown enters the shop. Larnell’s assistant String deals with Hambo, who is looking to sell an Ooga Booga replica to the store for some fast cash. String refuses Ham the offer when two tourists enter the store asking for directions. Hambo inexplicably poses them for a photo and promptly leaves with it. String sells the tourists on some marijuana paraphernalia and the pair leaves. Larnell is still selling the two patrons on some glassware by allowing them to test it with his own marijuana when the pair reveal they actually have no money. Larnell has String kick them out, who ominously returns with a bloody switch blade. Larnell goes to a back room and pulls Eebee out from a hidden safe.

Rabbit enters the shop and bearing Evil Bong merchandise. He tries to sell it to Larnell who instead is interested in the replica Gingerdead Man cookie that Rabbit is eating. He directs him to a newly opened bakery nearby called Dough Re Mi Bakery. Larnell goes to buy a cookie and Rabbit waits for him to return in the back and finds Eebee. He smokes from her and is pulled into her Bong World.

Sarah Leigh is working with her two employees at the bakery during this time and one of them asks about her newspaper article covering the bakery’s opening. Larnell walks in and asks Sarah to visit his store so they can form a partnership promoting their two small business and she leaves. The Gingerdead Man kills both employees of the bakery while they have sex in the back. He then follows Sarah to Larnell’s shop. Luann enters the shop asking about Brett. It is revealed that Brett and Bachman admitted their love for each other to everyone's surprise. Luann insults Sarah and leaves angrily. Larnell enters the back room with Sarah expecting to find Rabbit and instead finds Eebee. The Gingerdead Man arrives and kills String by shoving a bong through his head. Larnell and Sarah escape him by entering the Bong World. Eebee convinces the Gingerdead Man she has the power to restore his human form if he smokes from her and enters the Bong World too so he follows Sarah and Larnell.

Gingerdead Man finds himself in a Bong World jungle and meets King Bong, who has been trapped inside the Bong World by Eebee since the events of Evil Bong 2. King Bong uses his Poontang Tribeswomen to send Gingey to the Pastry Tribunal where he is sentenced to eternal damnation. Larnell and Sarah find Rabbit enjoying himself. He explains that the Bong World takes advantage and feeds off one's innermost desires, so they must think about not escaping. Gingey convinces the Tribunal to give him one chance at life as a cookie saying he will be good. Larnell and Sarah are transported out of the Bong World to Eebee’s surprise. She insists the Gingerdead Man will not be escaping who encounters Rabbit. Rabbit uses the Tribeswomen to neutralize him. The final scene shows the Gingerdead Man smoking a joint while sitting on a rock in the Bong World.

== Cast and characters ==
- Robin Sydney as Sarah Leigh / Luann
- Tian Wang as Asian Tourist
- Mindy Robinson as Poontang Girl #1 / Bikini Girl #1
- Timothy A. Bennett as Perv Customer
- Orson Chaplin as Hesher #2
- Ryan Curry as Larry
- Sonny Carl Davis as "Rabbit"
- The Don as "String"
- Joss Glennie-Smith as Hesher #1
- Chanell Heart as Poontang Girl #2 / Bikini Girl #3
- John Patrick Jordan as Larnell
- Jinhee Joung as Asian Wife
- John Karyus as The Gingerdead Man Mouth
- Victoria Levine as Debbie
- Masuimi Max as Uber Poontang Girl / Bikini Girl #2
- Amy Paffrath as Velicity
- Chance A. Rearden as Hambo
- Megan Steele as Body Double

=== Archive footage ===
- Brett Chukerman as Alistair McDowell (second Evil Bong film)
- Brian Lloyd as Brett
- David Weidoff as Alistair McDowell (first Evil Bong film)
- Gary Busey as Millard Findlemeyer (first Gingerdead Man film)
- Jacob Witkin as Cyril Cornwallis
- Mitch Eakins as Bachman
- Peter Stickles as Alistair McDowell (third Evil Bong film)
- Tommy Chong as Jim "Jimbo" Leary

=== Voice actors ===
- Michael A. Shepperd as King Bong (from second Evil Bong film)
- Bob Ramos as The Gingerdead Man
- Tokie Jazman as Rasta Brownie (from third Gingerdead Man film)
- Victoria De Mare as Tart (from third Gingerdead Man film)
- Philip Kreyche as Cream Puff (from third Gingerdead Man film)
- Jacques Aime LaBite as Baguette (from third Gingerdead Man film)
- Michelle Mais as Evil Bong / Eebee

== Production ==
While directing Gingerdead Man 2: Passion of the Crust and Gingerdead Man 3: Saturday Night Cleaver, William Butler had struck a deal with Charles Band that allowed him to do whatever he wanted, as long as his ideas fit within the films' budgets. Expecting the deal to continue, Butler had explored some ideas for a potential fourth movie involving the Gingerdead Man assassinating Santa Claus at the North Pole. Band turned down the proposed sequel, stating, "No way. You've gone too far!"

As a result, Butler left the series, and Band directed the next entry, a crossover with another Full Moon series: Evil Bong. The film largely ignores the events of the Gingerdead Man sequels and instead serves as a follow-up to the original film as well as Evil Bong 3D: The Wrath of Bong.

Bob Ramos replaced Butler as the voice of the Gingerdead Man, while John Karyus provided the live-action mouth used for the character’s talking scenes.

== Release ==
Gingerdead Man vs Evil Bong began streaming on the Full Moon Features app in October 2013, with a wider release in November 2013. It became available to rent on November 3, 2013 on Google Play, and Prime Video. In April 2022, the film became available to stream on Apple TV. The film was released on Blu-ray for the first time on Oct 05, 2021, in a box set called the Evil Bong Stash Box containing the first seven movies, the Gingerdead Man crossover and Weedjies: Halloweed Night. Scenes from the film are included in special edition Blu-rays released in 2025 titled the Gingerdead Man: Murder-Thon and Evil Bong-A-Thon, containing highlights of each series edited into one film.

=== Tie-in Merchandise ===
In celebration of the release, a limited edition cereal box was made available that depicts the titular characters on opposite sides of the box in with unique artwork. It comes with the DVD of the movie along with special features, and multi-grain cereal called "Nookie Crisp" or "Weedies" in reference to the characters.

=== Sequel ===
In 2014, Charles Band stated he had some ideas for a sequel, but it was never made. The Gingerdead Man reappeared in some of the Evil Bong sequels, and a crossover comic was released in 2018 titled The Gingerdead Man meets Evil Bong, published by Action Lab Comics.

=== Spin-off ===
Despite not directly featuring either title character, a fifth film of The Gingerdead Man series and also ninth of the Evil Bong series was released in 2021 titled The Gingerweed Man that includes characters from this film.

== Reception ==
JoBlo praised the trailer, writing that it was "hilariously awful". Missoula Independent praised the film for its bringing together two of Full Moon's favorite series. The reviewer was disturbed by the film's first scenes but stated that the film got better as it progressed.
