= Killer Eye: Halloween Haunt =

2011 film by Charles Band

The Killer Eye 2: Halloween Haunt
- Release poster
- Directed by: Charles Band
- Written by: Kent Roudebush; August White
- Story by: Charles Band
- Produced by: Charles Band
- Starring: Erica Rhodes; Olivia Alexander; Chelsea Edmundson; Ariana Madix; Lauren Furs
- Cinematography: Terrance Ryker
- Edited by: Danny Draven
- Music by: Richard Kosinski; William Levine
- Distributed by: Full Moon Features
- Release date: October 18, 2011
- Running time: 67 minutes
- Country: United States
- Language: English
- Budget: $500,000

The Killer Eye 2: Halloween Haunt (alternate, rerelease title: The Disembodied) is a 2011 comedy horror film by Full Moon Features and is a sequel to the 1999 The Killer Eye.

The film is unrated, but contains strong language, sexuality, sexual content, nudity, violence, and some gore.

== Plot ==
Jenna invites Rocky, Catalina, and Kiana to help her decorate her family's home for Halloween, while her mother is away for a week. The girls decide to take a break from decorating so that they can drink and dance. Rocky discovers a copy of a horror movie, The Killer Eye, complete with a plastic replica of the titular Eye. The girls begin to watch the movie, but find it terrible and split off to do other things. Out of sight, the plastic eye comes to life. It has the same hypnotic powers as the Eye from the movie, and uses them to hypnotize Kiana into doing a striptease. When she starts to break free of her trance, the Eye kills her first.

Next, the Eye hypnotizes Jenna into making out with Catalina, but they are interrupted by Giselle, who has crashed the party. While Jenna brings Giselle downstairs, while Catalina tries to sleep, she wakes up and screams very loud, then the eye attacks and kills her. Later, Giselle wanders into the living room and is hypnotized by the Eye. The Eye has learned how to take control of human bodies, and the hypnotized Giselle tells Rocky and Jenna that they will fall under the Eye's power and allow it to reproduce with them. Rocky attempts to destroy the Eye, but she gets killed in the process.

Jenna manages to snap Giselle out of her trance (twice), but the Eye resurrects Rocky and Catalina's dead bodies as human disguises to capture the two remaining girls. Jenna discovers a welder's mask that can block the Eye's hypnotic rays. As the Eye closes in on her, Giselle (wearing the mask) crushes the Eye with a sledgehammer to end its madness for good as well as avenging Rocky, Catalina and Kiana's deaths. Giselle and Jenna walk over to the Crystal ball and discover something unknown.

== Cast ==
- Erica Rhodes as Jenna
- Olivia Alexander as Giselle
- Chelsea Edmundson as Rocky
- Ariana Madix as Catalina
- Lauren Furs as Kiana
- Circus-Szalewski as Voice of Crystal Ball
- Danielle Stewart as Voice of Mother

== Reception ==
"This is a film about a film; yes, one of those." noted Halloween Horror Watchlist 3. TV Guide called it a "gruesomely fun fright-flick."

== See also ==
- List of films set around Halloween
