= Gingerdead Man 3: Saturday Night Cleaver =

2011 film by William Butler

- Release poster
- Directed by: William Butler
- Written by: William Butler; Muffy Bolding
- Produced by: Charles Band
- Starring: William Butler; Jackie Beat; Paris Wagner; Steve-Michael McLure; Kimberly Pfeffer; Justin Schwan; Selene Luna
- Cinematography: Terrance Ryker
- Edited by: Henry Gordon Jago
- Distributed by: Full Moon Features
- Release date: September 13, 2011
- Running time: 78 minutes
- Country: United States
- Language: English

Gingerdead Man 3: Saturday Night Cleaver (also known as Gingerdead Man 3: Roller Boogieman) is a 2011 American science fiction slasher comedy film by Full Moon Features and is the third main installment in The Gingerdead Man franchise and a direct sequel to Gingerdead Man 2: Passion of the Crust. It was co-written, directed, and produced by William Butler (who also stars) and was released on September 13, 2011, by producer Charles Band.

== Plot ==
At the Scientific Research Institute for the Study of Homicidal Baked Goods, The Gingerdead Man is visited by Clarissa Darling, an FBI agent, who attempts to kill the Gingerdead Man because he possesses the soul of her brother Toothless McHomeless of who was driven to suicide after taking a bite of the Gingerdead Man. As she's about to shoot the "half-baked piece of shit", a group of animal rights activists breaks into the institute, overpowers her, and releases the Gingerdead Man and the rest of the baked inmates. The killer cookie comes across the "Time Travel Studies" room, shoots Dr. Acula and his partner, and is sent back through time as Security tries to kill him.

He arrives at a Roller Disco Beauty Pageant in 1976 and can not get the remote to work to get him out, so he decides to kill. While the club's owner, Trixie, tells the skaters she has to close it down due to taxes, the Gingerdead Man kills three car-washing bimbos, Doreen, Connie, and Sandy, by connecting the hose to a tank of hydrochloric acid, melting them. Trixie introduces her odd niece, Cherry (who possesses telekinesis) to the skaters and then enlists her to help her pack up her office. Cherry meets one of the disco's staff, Randy, and skates with him against Trixie's wishes. Heading back inside, the Gingerdead Man tries to get one of the employees, Ingrid Harshman, to suck him off through a glory hole but she rips it off and eats it. He continues on and discovers the disco's janitor, Bugsby, having a threesome with two drugged teens, Peaches and Tux, and kills them all with a nail gun. Cherry is eventually nominated as one of the Beauty Pageant's finalists at the club, to the dismay of Trixie, who reveals that she caused the attack on Pearl Harbor with her skating talent, and the four-year winning champion, Tammy Pimento. When Tammy discovers she'll lose the pageant vote, she has her boyfriend, Wheels Epstein, set up a bucket of pig blood to fall on Cherry's head during the ceremony.

The Gingerdead Man kills the shoe clerk, Leroy, with a meat cleaver in the bathroom and mixes up the DJ Angel's cocaine with a cleaning product, killing her and takes over the music for the “Saturday night cleaver”. Meanwhile, two kids, Pickles and Tina discover the remote, manage to get it working, and are sent traveling through time. The Gingerdead Man messes up the prank and the bucket falls on Tammy instead. He cleaves her head in half and cleaves Wheels on stage. Pulling a gun from somewhere, he shoots Tammy's crew, Coco, Yoko, and PJ, dead. When the cookie shoots Trixie in the shoulder, Cherry uses her telekinesis to lock the doors in the club and brings the disco ball down, inadvertently electrocuting everyone except herself, Trixie, Ralph Ingrid, Randy, and the Gingerdead Man.

As the cookie's about to finish them off, Pickles and Tina return from time-traveling with Clarissa Darling, Security, Adolf Hitler, Charles Manson, Jeffrey Dahmer, and Lizzie Borden. All six-time travelers overpower the cookie, tear him to pieces and shove him into a cookie jar-magic lamp. Pickles and Tina reveal to the aunt the winning numbers for the lottery, which is enough to keep the club up and running. Pickles and Tina also reveal that because they warned the FBI Agent about the attack on the institute, the events of the entire film never happened. Everyone who has died comes back to life, and the time travelers go back to their own time period, including the aunt, who goes back in time to prevent herself from causing the Pearl Harbor attacks.

== Cast ==
=== Starring ===
- William Butler as The Gingerdead Man (Voice)
- Jackie Beat as Trixie, the roller disco club owner
- Paris Wagner as Cherry, Trixie's niece, a parody of Stephen King's Carrie
- Steven-Michael McLure as Randy, a clerk at the disco who is interested in Cherry
- Kimberly Pfeffer as Tammy Pimento, 4-time winner of the Disco Derby
- Justin Schwan as "Wheels" Epstein, Tammy's boyfriend and skating partner
- Selene Luna as Angel, the club DJ

=== Co-Starring ===
- Jacqui Holland as Peaches
- Jonny J. as "Tux"
- Laura Kachergus as Clarissa Darling, a parody of Clarice Starling
- Jean Louise O'Sullivan as P.J.
- Travis Walck as Leroy
- Elizabeth Bell as Connie
- Junie Hoang as Sandy
- Jonona Amor as Doreen

=== Featuring ===
- Steffinnie Phrommany as Yoko
- Tiffany Danielle as Coco
- Brendan Lamb as "Beef"
- Zachery Haas as "Pickles"
- Alexis Marie Colcord as Tina
- Caley Chase as Polly
- Jared Black
- Mike Manning as Adonis / Bugsby
- Jonathan "Jonno" Liberman as Dead Man #5 / Lead Boogie Skater
- Michael Airington as Baked Inmates (voice)
- Muffy Bolding as Ingrid Harshman

=== Lead Boogie Skaters ===
- Appelusa
- Ashley Beach
- Audrianna Acosta
- Crystal Rosenborough
- Danielle Hawkins
- Francesca Leigh
- Alix Liberman
- Kristen Best
- Meryl Taylor
- Jay Runciman
- LeBrian
- Chelsea Benetatos

=== Featured Skaters ===
- Jessica Romero
- Vinson Corbo
- Donna Macias
- Betsy Bolding
- Jose Gonzalez
- William Cash
- Michael Rojas
- Richard Ray
- Martin Donovan
- Rachel Stiller
- Robert Popa
- Jarrod Long
- Markita Colter
- Richard Figone
- Natalie Diaz
- Logan Cross
- Daniel Hoock
- Delicia Davis
- Cat Doss
- Fred Brotman
- Brian Grandis
- Tamara Torres
- Kimberly Forchetti
- Randy Hardin
- Chris Henderson
- Maren McConnell
- Josi Cat
- Elizabeth Halverson
- Gladys Bocardo
- Anthony sant' Anselmo
- Jonathon Weilbaecker
- Tim Jahn
- Steve Early
- Jeandrea Larson
- Madison Mojica
- Lisa Harris
- Michael Johns
- Matt Aidan
- Senor Amor

=== Parody Skaters (uncredited) ===
- Bogdan Szumilas as Hitler
- Peter Stickles as Jeffrey Dahmer
- Bobby Bromley as Charles Manson
- Bobbi Brown McRae as Lizzie Borden

== Production ==
On July 16, 2008, Charles Band announced in the Full Moon Features video newsletter uploaded to his CharlesBandVidcasts account on YouTube that he and the company would have a booth at the 2008 San Diego Comic Con. At the end of this video, he also announced that they’d be promoting their 6 films in “pre-production” and naming 4 of them, with one of them being GDM3 . Band says “we’re having so much fun with that little, pissed-off cookie. So, we’re doing Gingerdead Man 3: Roller Boogieman”. An early promotional poster for the film reflects this subtitle as well as featuring the Gingerdead Man with his face half-burned, a reference to the previous film's ending. The burn on his face appears in the first scene of GDM3, however, he's not depicted as burned for any other part of the film. The subtitle “Roller Boogieman” would later be incorporated into the final film's tagline, “The Ultimate Roller Boogieman”. In a later vidcast from August 25, 2008, Band announced the Full Moon Executive Producer Credit that would be active for the upcoming Labor Day week. The company runs the credit as a successful way to crowdsource funds for their in-production films by offering an “executive producer” credit on the film to anyone who buys $120 worth of merchandise from the Full Moon website during a designated time period. He also announced that the film's title would be changed to possibly Gingerdead Man 3: Saturday Night Cleaver, saying “it’s an idea; it may be really stupid” and which he expected to be filmed in 2009. The film was slated for a 2009 release, but filming was delayed until January 2010. In another vidcast from August 21, 2009, Band announced another “Executive Producer Credit” for the upcoming Labor Day weekend.

== Release ==
Full Moon Entertainment released the film on September 13, 2011, on DVD. The film was later included on DVD as part of a ten-film horror pack released in 2012. The film was released on Blu-ray for the first time on September 26, 2024, as part of a box set that also includes the other films in the trilogy, the crossover and the spin-off The Gingerweed Man. Scenes from the film are included in a special edition Blu-ray released in December 2025 titled the Gingerdead Man: Murder-Thon containing highlights of the series edited into one film.

== Reception ==
HorrorNews.net gave the film a mixed review in 2011. Reviewer Alex DiVincenzo notes that director William Butler does a well enough job of filling Gary Busey's shoes (although the actor's voice talent is missed) as the voice of the titular killer and says that the puppetry adds to the film's "schlocky charm". DiVincenzo also posed criticisms saying the abundant CGI is "distracting" and that the film "relies too heavily on spoofs which brings to mind the soulless works of Jason Friedberg and Aaron Seltzer (Epic Movie, Date Movie, et al.)". Despite this, the review concludes that the film "packs a ton of retro fun into about 75 minutes" and unlike some other Full Moon properties " Gingerdead Man still has plenty of life baked in it" in reference to the inevitable sequel (released two years later).

DreadCentral.com reviewed the film in 2011 saying that "a lowbrow sense script is elevated by an enthusiastic cast that make this 75-minute smorgasbord of delirium a real guilty pleasure" and compared it to USA Network's Up All Night arguing that the film would have been at home among the Gilbert Gottfried and Rhonda Shear hosted variety show. The review does note the absence of Gary Busey, point out the many anachronisms with the film's time period, and argues that the opening scene sets up a more interesting premise than the one actually followed in the movie. He notes that the film's absurd ending is some "truly inspired lunacy," ultimately awarding the film 3 out of 5 "knives" (stars).

The film was received more negatively by Cinema-Crazed.com in a review that called it "an obvious satire sans the laughs." The review also points out the plot arbitrarily pieced together resulting in a "film [that] is just a lot of blatant nudity, gratuitous sex, and Gingerdead Man fading into the background".

== Crossover ==
The fourth film in the Gingerdead Man franchise is a crossover with another Full Moon Entertainment property, Evil Bong, titled Gingerdead Man vs. Evil Bong. It was released on October 29, 2013.
