= Evil Bong 3D: The Wrath of Bong =

- Release poster
- Directed by: Charles Band
- Screenplay by: August White
- Story by: Patrick Klepek
- Produced by: Charles Band; Co-Producer: Rick Short
- Starring: John Patrick Jordan; Brian Lloyd; Mitch Eakins; Peter Stickles; Sonny Carl Davis; Jacob Witkin; Robin Sydney; Christina DeRosa; Amy Paffrath; Michelle Mais; Circus-Szalewski and Irwin Keyes
- Cinematography: Terrance Ryker
- Edited by: Danny Draven
- Music by: Richard Band
- Production company: Full Moon Entertainment
- Distributed by: Full Moon Entertainment
- Release date: April 8, 2011
- Running time: 87 minutes
- Country: United States
- Language: English
- Box office: $91,260

Evil Bong 3-D: The Wrath of Bong is a 2011 comedy film directed by Charles Band and the third film in the Evil Bong series, following Evil Bong 2: King Bong. The film was released on April 8, 2011 through Full Moon Entertainment and was given a limited theatrical release which featured a live stage show from the band in a tour format, making it the first Full Moon film to be released theatrically. Evil Bong was shot in 3D and utilized scratch and sniff cards that film viewers could smell at certain times during the film.

== Plot ==
In the early morning hours on April 20, a man burying his wife in the woods sees a meteor crash nearby. Investigating, he finds it is no meteor, but an alien capsule containing a large Space Bong, that he takes with him. Alistair McDowell, now working at the Space Institute, has been tracking the comet. He finds it in the woods and realizes it is not a comet. He is surprised by Larnell, who is apparently a Black Belt now and who initially does not recognize him (a reference to Alistair’s 2nd recasting). He immediately pushes conspiracy theories on Al, claiming James Cameron is an alien and that all forms of government agencies are corrupt. He also explains he is running from the government, living off-grid and training in fighting with a “Ninja Master” called Wong Dong, who is really just a car stereo thief. He convinces Al to help him find what he thinks is an alien bong, due to the marijuana residue on the object. The Killer Husband brings the Space Bong to a small smoke shop co-owned by Brett and Bachman and sells it to them. It is revealed that the alien marijuana, which he found on the meteor, has spread like a rash over his skin. Brett calls Al to see if he can tell them anymore about the bong. In a back room, Bachman smokes from Space Bong, who comes to life, and is pulled into Space Bong’s Bong World, where he is set upon by mostly nude women.

Al and Larnell arrive to inspect the Bong. Brett notices the alien fungus has grown on things the Killer Husband touched and Al finds the same thing happening with his meteor samples. Just then, Rabbit, still a “practicing” priest, shows up for a scheduled “study session” with Bachman, who has gone missing. Brett’s ex girlfriend, Luann, whom he now avoids, briefly stops by. Rabbit is enticed into smoking from Space Bong, who reveals his intentions to take over Earth. Larnell, Brett, and Al enter the back room in time to see Rabbit being sucked into the Bong World. Larnell suggests they contact his grandfather, Cyril (now a medical marijuana doctor going by Dr. Weed) who shows up with his assistant Nurse Hookah. Cyril, along with Evil Bong, Eebee, was ditched by the gang in the Amazon after defeating King Bong, and having escaped together, the two have since become friends and business partners. Space Bong insults Eebee, so she and Cyril agree to help the gang stop the alien invader, who thinks he can outsmart everyone. Larnell, Alistair and Eebee all enter Space Bong's Bong World while Nurse Hookah holds Brett hostage, per Cyril’s orders, in case anything goes wrong.

Inside, Larnell and Eebee find Rabbit and Bachman hooked up to alien contraptions used to farm their sperm. Soon, Alistair finds himself trapped in one of the machines. Meanwhile outside Bong World, Space Bong convinces Cyril that he is not an invader, but simply a peaceful alien visitor. Brett overpowers Nurse Hookah and enters the Bong World. He finds Rabbit and Bachman, both milked dry and delirious, Bachman covered in the alien fungus. The trio find Eebee and Larnell trying to get Al out of the sperm extractor, whose sperm is more valuable to Space Bong since he is more intelligent. Larnell uses his fighting skills to take out the nude alien women and free Al, but the gang is still trapped in Space Bong’s Bong World.

Eebee suggests they create a reverse entryway out of the Bong World by combining Space Bong’s “female units” and smoke from alien-weed-covered Bachman, whom they light on fire. Afterwards, he lights up a joint, the power of which causes Space Bong and his women to explode, returning the gang to Earth. Some time later, Brett and Luann are back together and the gang is hanging out at his shop. Larnell orders pizza, remarking on how he misses Velicity, who walks in with the pizza. She explains she lost her income after they destroyed King Bong and Cyril stopped employing her, so she is decided to stay with him. Brett is revealed to have some of the alien marijuana fungus growing on him, to Luann’s dismay. In a final scene, Cyril and Nurse Hookah find the original meteor, the crash site now having been overgrown with the alien weed.

== Cast ==
- Circus-Szalewski as The Alien Bong (Voice)
- Michelle Mais as EeBee (Voice)
- Irwin Keyes as The Killer
- Christina DeRosa as Nurse Hookah
- Robin Sydney as Luann
- Amy Paffrath as Velicity
- Peter Stickles as Alistair McDowell
- Eden Modiano as Devil Chick
- Dena Kollar as Angel Chick
- Sonny Carl Davis as "Rabbit"
- John Patrick Jordan as Larnell
- Mitch Eakins as Bachman
- Jacob Witkin as Gramps
- Brian Lloyd as Brett
- Nina Estes as Graffiti Chick
- Tara Spadaro as TV Chick

== Production ==
The subtitle The Wrath of Bong was submitted by a fan named Patrick Klepek as part of a contest to name the film. Incidentally, he misread the contest rules and also submitted an idea for the plot, which was fleshed out and used in the movie, earning him a writing credit.

== Marketing and release ==
In 2011, Full Moon announced a sweepstakes ahead of the film's theatrical release, asking fans to post their own teaser trailers for the film, for a chance to win 4,020. With only six winners. Other contests invited fans to submit photos and videos of themselves for a chance to be awarded the title of Biggest Stoner or recognized for having the nicest genitalia. The film premiered at the Historic Portage Theater Film Festival in Chicago, the film utilized 3D and Scratch and sniff cards that audiences could smell during events in the film.

=== Box office ===
Evil Bong 3D opened with 24,775 in its opening weekend, and through the rest of the week, grossed 91,260.

=== Home media ===
Evil Bong 3D: The Wrath of Bong was released on DVD on September 6, 2011. The film was released on Blu-ray for the first time on Oct 5, 2021, in a box set called the Evil Bong Stash Box containing the first seven movies, the Gingerdead Man crossover and Weedjies: Halloweed Night. Scenes from the film are included in a special edition Blu-ray released in June 2025 titled the Evil Bong-A-Thon, containing highlights of the series edited into one film.

== Reception ==
Fangoria gave the film one and a half skulls, saying that it "may fall short of entertaining via either the lame film or poorly executed gimmicks, but it’s not for lack of trying". HorrorNews.net gave a positive review for Evil Bong 3D, stating that fans of the series would enjoy the entry as it was "more of the same" and "trumps the previous sequel".

== Crossover with Gingerdead Man ==
Charles Band has announced on his vid cast that they will shoot for Gingerdead Man vs. Evil Bong. Gingerdead Man vs. Evil Bong was released in 2013.
