= Skull Heads =

- DVD cover
- Directed by: Charles Band
- Written by: Charles Band
- Produced by: Charles Band
- Starring: Robin Sydney; Rane Jameson; Steve Kramer; Samantha Light; Kim Argetsinger; Lucia Stara; Antonio Covatta; Giacomo Gonella
- Music by: Richard Band; Gratis Music Library
- Distributed by: Full Moon Features
- Release date: October 6, 2009
- Running time: 80 minutes
- Country: United States
- Language: English

Skull Heads (also known as Devious) is a 2009 drama/horror film written, produced and directed by Charles Band and distributed by his company Full Moon Features. The film revolves around an emotionally backward young woman who lives in a castle in Italy with her mother and her aggressive father, along with a dark secret hidden within the castle.

== Plot ==
In the basement of their castle in Rome, Italy, Naomi Arkoff is tortured on a rack by her father Carver, "this" time for having a cell phone. Untying her, he warns that next time her punishment won't be slow and painful. She runs upstairs screaming: "I can run faster than you!" over and over.

The next afternoon, Carver's wife Lisbeth questions what he did to Naomi. At lunch Carver tells his intellectually disabled half brother Peter that the lamb they're eating is Sophia, for whom Peter has an affection. Naomi cheers him up with her toy horse. Lisbeth takes a tray of food upstairs to her father and reads Edgar Allan Poe's "From Childhood's Hour" to him. She alerts him that his guardian angels are in the room, shown to be small creatures with big skulls.

Naomi tells Lisbeth she wants to get away to college and meet people and do exciting things. Lisbeth tries to dissuade her, telling about Naomi's grandmother who went to see the circus when Lisbeth was a baby and didn't come back. When Lisbeth was a teenager the circus returned and Lisbeth saw her mother in the circus performing acrobatics. Lisbeth finds an iPod under Naomi's pillow, but allows Naomi to keep it so long as her father doesn't know.

The next morning Kimi, L.J., and Jensen arrive, Hollywood producers scouting locations. Carver tears up Kimi's business card telling Uncle Peter to escort them out. Naomi gathers up the card, sneaks a cell phone from a delivery boy, and invites the trio to dinner.

Having calmed her father over having guests, everyone settles for the meal when they hear something. The family explains it's "the protectors". The Romans buried the dead in catacombs and built the castle above to guard against grave robbers. The "Skull Heads" are born of witchcraft to protect the dead from violation.

Leaving after a tour of the castle, the film crew are revealed to actually be art thieves. The next morning, preparing to torture Naomi, Carver finds Peter trying to have sex with the maid Claudia. He beats Peter out of the room but has Claudia keep her pants down as he unzips himself. That night, Kimi, L.J. and Jensen sneak in and start stealing items.

Jensen finds and releases Naomi from the rack. As they're about to escape, they run into Carver and Lisbeth. Arguing over the right decision for Naomi, Lisbeth explains that Naomi is not only Carver and Lisbeth's daughter, but also their niece as Carver and Lisbeth are brother and sister. Naomi is a little retarded because she is inbred and confused over her identity. Suddenly, Lisbeth and Carver are shot by Kimi, who then forces Jensen and Naomi back into the basement.

Kimi has Naomi tie Jensen to the rack for betraying his partner, then presses a button causing the rack to run automatically and locks Naomi in a trap. L.J. and Kimi continue grabbing the valuables they had earmarked. The Skull Heads resurrect the bodies of Carver and Lisbeth as zombies and have them go after the thieves. Carver and Lisbeth corner L.J. and Kimi at the castle doors where they start eating off their faces, spraying blood all over the walls.

Peter releases Naomi and Jensen. Jensen follows Naomi upstairs to get her grandfather and is shocked to find he has been dead for quite some time. Suddenly, his body rises up and surprises Jensen, revealing one of the Skull Heads controlling his body. Jensen runs back downstairs, grabs Kimi's gun, shoots at Carver and Lisbeth and runs outside, shutting the doors behind him. Just as he thinks he is safe, a screaming Naomi opens the doors, grabs Jensen and pulls him back in, slamming the doors behind her.

== Cast ==
- Robin Sydney as Naomi
- Samantha Light as Lisbeth
- Steve Kramer as Carver
- Rane Jameson as Jensen
- Kim Argetsinger as Kimi
- Lucia Stara as Claudia
- Antonio Covatta as L.J.
- Giacomo Gonnella as Peter

== Reception ==
Dread Central said, "Much of what makes Skull Heads work is due to the performances, in particular that of Robin Sydney as the sympathetic Naomi. She successfully carries the film on her shoulders – and boobs."
