= Last Foxtrot in Burbank =

- Directed by: Charles Band
- Written by: Bill Haggard; Sam Vaughn
- Starring: Michael Pataki
- Cinematography: Tom Grubbs
- Edited by: John Carpenter
- Distributed by: Federated Film Corporation
- Release date: October 26, 1973
- Running time: 65 minutes
- Country: United States
- Language: English

Last Foxtrot in Burbank is a 1973 film directed by Charles Band. It is a spoof of Bernardo Bertolucci's Last Tango in Paris.

This film was believed to be a lost film but a copy of it was found in the University of California, Los Angeles Archives and was eventually re-released.

== Cast ==
- Michael Pataki as Paul (credited as Michael Loveman)
- Sherry Denton as Jeanne
- Merlouch Drabin
- I. William Quinn as Tom
- Sally Marr as Mrs. Kitchenberg
- Simmy Bow as Marcel
- Richard Band

== Release ==
Last Foxtrot in Burbank had its premiere in Los Angeles on October 26, 1973.

== See also ==
- List of American films of 1973
