= Decadent Evil =

2005 vampire film by Charles Band

Decadent Evil (US); Decadent Evil Dead (UK)
- Directed by: Charles Band
- Written by: Charles Band; August White
- Produced by: Charles Band; Joe Dain; Jeremy Gordon; Jethro Rothe-Kushel
- Starring: Phil Fondacaro; Hazel Dean; Raelyn Hennessee; Daniel Lennox
- Cinematography: Keith James Duggan
- Edited by: Danny Draven
- Music by: James Thomas Sale
- Release date: 25 June 2005 (Los Angeles)
- Running time: 70 minutes
- Countries: United States; United Kingdom
- Language: English

Decadent Evil (known by the slightly reworked title of Decadent Evil Dead in the UK) is a 2005 vampire film, produced and directed by Charles Band under his Wizard Entertainment banner, released on June 25. The film was shot in and around Los Angeles, California.

The films stars Phil Fondacaro, Debra Mayer, Jill Michelle, Daniel Lennox, Hazel Dean and Raelyn Hennessee. Porn actress Harmony Rose has a small role as a hooker.

== Plot ==
A fallen foot tall Homunculus called Marvin (a part human/part reptile creature) is imprisoned in a birdcage by a vengeful lover who is bidding to become the world's most powerful vampire.

Footage from Vampire Journals (a spin off from the Subspecies franchise) is used at the beginning of the movie to explain how Morella, the vampire Queen, left her bloodline behind in Europe. The movie ends with Morella transformed into a Homunculus and having sex in the cage with Marvin.

== Cast ==
- Hazel Dean as Tami
- Phil Fondacaro as Ivan
- Raelyn Hennessee as "Spyce"
- Daniel Lennox as Dexter "Dex"
- Debra Mayer as Morella
- Jill Michelle as "Sugar"
- Brian Muito as Club Patron

== Production ==
The concept of Decadent Evil was conceived by Charles Band during a trip to a strip club. The film was shot in six days, starting on Halloween. The blood effects were achieved with maple syrup that was dyed dark red.

== Reception ==
Critical reception was typically negative. Scott Weinberg reviewed Decadent Evil for DVD Talk, calling it "a mess in just about every sense of the word -- but that won't stop me from checking out his next projects". Felix Vasquez of Cinema Crazed also reviewed the movie, similarly panning it. Kim Newman reviewed both Decadent Evil and Decadent Evil II, criticizing both.

== Sequel and legacy ==
Charles Band directed a sequel to Decadent Evil, Decadent Evil II, in 2007. Jill Michelle with Danniel Lennox returned to star in the film, while the role of Ivan Burroughs was played by Ricardo Gil. Fondacaro would later reprise the role of Ivan Burroughs in Evil Bong. A character by the name of Ivan Ivanov, played by George Appleby and revealed to be the character Ivan Burroughs, appeared in the 2016 series Ravenwolf Towers and the 2017 film Puppet Master: Axis Termination.

== Merchandising ==
A thirteen-inch replica of Marvin the homunculus was released by Full Moon Playthings in 2005.
