= Dr. Moreau's House of Pain =

- Directed by: Charles Band
- Written by: Earl Kenton (screenplay); H. G. Wells (novel)
- Starring: John Patrick Jordan; Peter Donald Badalamenti II; Jessica Lancaster
- Music by: James T. Sale
- Distributed by: Full Moon Entertainment
- Release date: January 2004
- Running time: 72 minutes
- Country: United States
- Language: English

Dr. Moreau's House of Pain is a 2004 American horror film directed by Charles Band.

== Plot ==
A group of friends investigate various strange events and find themselves trapped in a house at the mercy of a strange doctor and his various hideous "creations".

== Cast ==
- John Patrick Jordan as Eric Carson
- Jessica Lancaster as Judith
- Peter Donald Badalamenti II as Gallagher (credited as Peter D. Badalamenti II)
- Lorielle New as Alliana (credited as Loriele New)
- Ling Aum as Pak
- B.J. Smith as "Peewee"
- Debra Mayer as Mary Anne
- Jacob Witkin as Dr. Moreau
- Laura Petersen as Gorgana (credited as Laura Ushijima)
- Jack Kennedy as "Moose"
- Steve Quimby as Johnny "Johnny Q"
- Tony Simmons as The Bartender
