= Peter Stickles =

American actor (born 1976)

- Born: October 8, 1976 (age 50); Oswego, New York
- Occupation: Actor
- Spouse: Michael Carbonaro (m. 2014)

Peter Stickles (born October 8, 1976) is an American actor. He is best known for his role as the voyeuristic Caleb in the John Cameron Mitchell film Shortbus and as Damian, leader of a gay vampire cult, in the Here TV original series The Lair.

== Career ==
Stickles was cast in Shortbus in 2003 from amongst some 400 actors who submitted audition tapes for the film, which was initially known as "Sex Film Project." No script had been written prior to casting and the story was built out of improvisational sessions once the cast was in place. The voyeuristic aspect of Caleb's character grew in part out of Stickles's own interests at the time. "I was exploring sex clubs at the time and not necessarily participating but watching from afar. I think John Cameron Mitchell was attracted to the idea of this whole voyeuristic aspect of the character. ... How far would you go to touch somebody from afar?"

Stickles, along with others in the cast, was nominated for the Gotham Independent Film Award for Best Ensemble Cast.

Stickles stars in The Lair, which premiered on here! in June 2007. His character, Damian, is the leader of a gay vampire cult. The series, although not critically well-reviewed, was renewed for a second season which premiered in late 2008.

Stickles has appeared in a number of low-budget and direct-to-video horror films, including such titles as Meat Weed Madness (2006) and its sequel Meat Weed America (2007), and has four films slated for release in 2008. He also appeared in the exercise video The Bedroom Workout for Men: Better Sex Through Exercise.

== Personal life ==
Stickles is openly gay. He has been married to magician Michael Carbonaro since 2014.

== Filmography ==
| Year | Title | Role | Note |
|---|---|---|---|
| 2000 | Shaft | Mickey Hunt 2 | |
| 2000 | Strangers with Candy | Track Team Fan | TV series - Episode: "Blank Relay" |
| 2004 | Personal Sergeant | Street Punk | |
| 2005 | Dead Serious | Hostage | |
| 2006 | Shortbus | Caleb, The Stalker | |
| 2006 | Cemetery Gates | Hunter Belmont | |
| 2007 | 2 Minutes Later | Victor | |
| 2007 | The Girl Next Door | EMT | |
| 2007 | Sexina: Popstar P.I. | Onski | |
| 2007 | Meat Weed America | Bin Smokin' | direct-to-video |
| 2007 | The Lair | Damian Courtenay | TV series - 26 episodes |
| 2008 | Eat Your Heart Out | Vincent | Skinned Alive |
| 2008 | Evilution | Stanfa | |
| 2008 | Watch Out | Brian | |
| 2009 | The Crystal Lake Massacres Revisited | V | |
| 2009 | The Conquest of the Silken Beaver | Peter | segment "Painting by Numbers" |
| 2009 | George's Intervention | Ben | |
| 2010 | BearCity | Executive | |
| 2010 | The Brides of Sodom | Dominic | |
| 2010 | The Black Box | Bob Wilkins, Newscaster | |
| 2011 | Sunday on the Set with George | Unknown | short |
| 2011 | Gingerdead Man 3-D: Saturday Night Cleaver | Jeffrey Dahmer | |
| 2011 | Evil Bong 3D: The Wrath of Bong | Alistair | |
| 2011 | Psychosomatika | Sage | |
| 2011 | For Christ's Sake | Pete Browning | |
| 2011 | I Want to Get Married | Jim | |
| 2011 | Showgirls 2: Penny's from Heaven | Godhardt Brandt | |
| 2013 | The Trouble with Barry | Barry Montenegro | feature |
| 2014 | Best Day Ever | James | |
| 2017 | Stage Fright | Kevin | |
