= Evil Bong 2: King Bong =

2009 film by Charles Band

Evil Bong 2: King Bong (2009)
- Release poster
- Directed by: Charles Band
- Screenplay by: August White
- Story by: Charles Band; August White
- Produced by: Executive Producer; Dana Harrloe; Thomas Smead; Co-Producer; Dan Golden; Charles Band
- Starring: John Patrick Jordan; Amy Paffrath; Sonny Davis; Brett Chukerman; Mitch Eakins
- Cinematography: Terrance Ryker
- Edited by: Henry Gordon Jago
- Music by: District 78
- Distributed by: Full Moon Features
- Release date: July 7, 2009
- Running time: 80 minutes
- Country: United States
- Language: English

Evil Bong 2: King Bong, (alternate title: Evil Bong 2: Devils Harvest) is a 2009 stoner comedy film directed by Charles Band and the sequel to Evil Bong. It follows the same four main characters as they deal with the fallout of their encounter with Eebee, the Evil Bong from the first film, and search the Amazon for King Bong. The film's subtitle and poster parody King Kong, a film that also features a group of people traveling to a remote jungle in search of the titular character.

== Plot ==
Sometime after they helped destroy Evil Bong, Eebee, college student Larnell finds Alister McDowell at his dorm room door, remarking “I almost didn’t recognize you” (a reference to Alister's recasting). Larnell invites him in and explains something is wrong with him and his roommates Bachman, and Brett: Bachman has become narcoleptic followed by amnesia, Larnell has uncontrollable sexual urges, and Brett has become massively overweight due to an uncontrollable appetite.

The group decides to call the delivery man Rabbit, who first delivered Eebee. He arrives and after a brief interaction with Larnell, agrees to trade information for marijuana. He tells them Jimbo Leary bought the bong in the Amazon in the 1960s while working for the peace corps. When half his friends die after smoking from Eebee, Jimbo locked her in his attic, where she stayed until his wife sold it, leading to the events of the first film. Believing they can find a cure, the five men travel to the Amazon. There, they encounter Velicity, a woman who is continuing her recently deceased father's research with his research partner. Larnell and Rabbit discover a pile of marijuana behind Velicity's hut, packed to move. Guarding it is Velicity's partner, Larnell's grandfather Cyril, who is inexplicably out of his wheelchair and able to walk. Larnell and Rabbit go inside the hut where Velicity explains that her father uncovered a prehistoric strain of marijuana cultivated by an ancient people, "the Poontang Tribe". She has found that the marijuana can be used to help cure people of health problems and severe injuries-explaining how Cyril is able to walk again-and Velicity is planning on donating the marijuana to help cancer patients. Bachman suggests that the marijuana could help them with their extreme side effects, so they smoke some and it seems to work.

Larnell pulls out leftover pieces of Eebee's face which Velicity immediately recognizes as Poontang craftsmanship. Eebee is brought back to life by the ancient marijuana smoke and Velicity takes the pieces to Cyril. She overhears a phone call between Cyril and a potential buyer, so she confronts him. He chastises her for her naivety, and she runs off upset. Having heard Cyril's plan, Eebee offers her help if he helps restore her original form, which Cyril does. Rabbit shows up and tries to cut a distribution deal with Cyril, threatening to expose Cyril's intended operation if he does not cut him in, when three Poontang Tribeswomen appear behind them, holding spears. They attack Cyril (who runs off) and capture Rabbit and Eebee. The three women bring Rabbit and Eebee to King Bong even larger, skull-shaped bong with eyes. They place Eebee on an altar next to King Bong and they argue, revealing a past relationship. The women “force” Rabbit to smoke from the King Bong and he enters the Bong World. Cyril returns to the hut, bleeding, where he tells the others what happened. Larnell, Velicity, Alister, Bachman and Brett head out to save Rabbit leaving Cyril behind.

They find King Bong and theorize that he is more powerful than Eebee and has ability to pull a person's whole being into the Bong World, not just their soul. Eebee, still being bitter from King Bong's implied infidelity, tells them they have to destroy his “symbol”, a necklace and the source of his power. Bachman and Brett enter the Bong World (this time a jungle) and are danced on by two mostly nude tribeswomen before being tied up and brought before King Bong with Rabbit. Larnell and Alister enter find the tribe rolling Rabbit up in giant paper, turning him into a massive joint that King Bong shrinks down to a normal size with his necklace. They untie Bachman and Brett and the group attacks the tribe while Larnell shatters the necklace, destroying King Bong and sending them out of the Bong World. They all walk off, ignoring Eebee's angry cries to them not to leave her on the altar alone. The film ends with everyone smoking in Larnell's dorm, everything back to normal.

== Cast ==
- John Patrick Jordan as Larnell.
- Amy Paffrath as Velicity. It is the first of the four films of the franchise with this character.
- Sonny Davis as "Rabbit".
- Brett Chukerman as Alistair McDowell. The character is also in the first movie, but played by another actor.
- Mitch Eakins as Bachman.
- Brian Lloyd as Brett.
- Jacob Witkin as Cyril.
- Robin Sydney as Luann.
- Michele Mais as V.O. Eebee.
- Michael A. Shepard as V.O. King Bong.
- Ariel X as Poontang Tribe.
- August as Poontang Tribe.
- Emilianna as Poontang Tribe.
- Kat as Poontang Tribe.
- Kyle Stone as Poontang Tribe.

== Production ==
During production on the original Evil Bong, Charles Band had already started developing ideas for a sequel, first mentioning "King Bong" as a possible title in the behind-the-scenes featurette.

Jeff Farley of Obscure Artifacts returned to design the King Bong prop as well as the effects for Brian Lloyd's fat suit.

Brett Chukerman was recast as Allistair, replacing David Weidoff.

== Release ==
Evil Bong 2: King Bong was released on DVD on July 7, 2009. The film was released on Blu-ray for the first time on Oct 5, 2021, in a box set called the Evil Bong Stash Box containing the first seven movies, the Gingerdead Man crossover and Weedjies: Halloweed Night. Scenes from the film are included in a special edition Blu-ray released in June 2025 titled the Evil Bong-A-Thon, containing highlights of the series edited into one film.

== Sequel ==
A Sequel titled "Evil Bong 3D: The Wrath of Bong" was released two years later, it utilized scratch and sniff cards and was released theatrically on April 8, 2011, before given a DVD release later on.
