= Groom Lake (film) =

- DVD cover
- Directed by: William Shatner
- Written by: William Shatner; Maurice Hurley
- Produced by: Chuck Williams; J. R. Bookwalter
- Starring: Dan Gauthier; Amy Acker; Tom Towles; Dick Van Patten; John Prosky; Dan Martin; Rickey Medlocke; Duane Whitaker; Brenda Bakke; William Shatner
- Cinematography: Mac Ahlberg
- Edited by: Brad Lauren; Steven Nielson
- Music by: Richard John Baker
- Distributed by: Shadow Entertainment, Koch Entertainment
- Release date: September 21, 2002 (Temecula Valley International Film Festival)
- Running time: 92 minutes
- Country: United States
- Language: English

Groom Lake, also called The Visitor, is a 2002 science fiction film directed by William Shatner and starring Amy Acker.

== Cast ==
- William Shatner as John Gossner
- Dan Gauthier as Andy
- Amy Acker as Kate
- Tom Towles as Dietz
- Dick Van Patten as Irving "Irv" Barnett
- John Prosky as Hester Dealt
- Dan Martin as Captain Morgan
- Rickey Medlocke as Rancher
- Duane Whitaker as Dr. Stevens
- Brenda Bakke as Joyce
- J. T. Colosa as J.T.
- Debra Mayer as Nurse In Clinic
- Chuck Williams as The Alien
