= The Gingerdead Man =

2005 film by Charles Band

- DVD cover
- Directed by: Charles Band
- Written by: William Butler; Domonic Muir
- Produced by: Charles Band; Jethro Rothe-Kushel
- Starring: Gary Busey; Robin Sydney; Ryan Locke; Alexia Aleman; Jonathan Chase; Margaret Blye; Daniela Melgoza; Newell Alexander; James Snyder; Larry Cedar
- Cinematography: Keith J. Duggan
- Edited by: Danny Draven
- Music by: Roger Ballenger
- Production company: Full Moon Features
- Distributed by: Full Moon Entertainment; Talos Entertainment
- Release date: August 30, 2005
- Running time: 70 minutes
- Country: United States
- Language: English

The Gingerdead Man is a 2005 American comedy slasher film directed by Charles Band. Gary Busey stars as the titular Gingerdead Man, created from a mix of gingerbread spice mix and the ashes of deceased serial killer Millard Findlemeyer, who terrorizes a small-town bakery. The film also stars Robin Sydney, Jonathan Chase, Alexia Aleman, Margaret Blye, James Snyder, and Larry Cedar.

== Plot ==
At Cadillac Jack’s diner in Waco, Texas, killer Millard Findlemeyer murders most of the Leigh family, leaving only Sarah Leigh and her mother, Betty, alive.

Sarah’s testimony leads to Millard’s conviction and execution in the electric chair. After his death, Millard’s ashes are collected by his mother, who adds them into a gingerbread spice mix.

Later, Sarah and Betty struggle to keep their pastry shop, The Bakery, afloat. Betty has turned to alcohol, and Sarah sends her home with bakery worker Julia. Sarah is confronted by Jimmy Dean, a determined businessman who wants to buy their property, and his conniving daughter, Lorna.

A mysterious delivery of gingerbread spice mix (courtesy of Millard’s mother) arrives at The Bakery. Sarah and her employee Brick Fields use the mix to bake a giant gingerbread man. During the process, Brick accidentally cuts himself, and his blood mingles with the dough. Brick leaves early for a wrestling match, leaving Sarah to bake the dough in the industrial oven.

Meanwhile, Lorna sneaks into The Bakery to sabotage it. She plants a rat to trigger the health department to shut them down. During a heated confrontation, Lorna accidentally hits a switch that surges electricity into the oven, bringing the gingerbread man to life.

Amos Cadbury, Lorna’s boyfriend, grows impatient waiting outside The Bakery and enters the shop. Sarah removes the animated “Gingerdead Man” from the oven, now a murderous, sentient cookie.

The group tries to lock the Gingerdead Man in the freezer while Sarah attempts to call the police, only to find the phone line dead. Lorna calls her father using Amos’s cell phone before its battery dies.

Betty returns to search for her alcohol stash, and Julia arrives looking for Betty. Betty loses a finger and is forced into the oven, while Julia is knocked out with a frying pan and left in the freezer.

Amos retrieves a handgun from his car. As Jimmy Dean arrives to pick up Lorna, the Gingerdead Man steals his car, and, using a rolling pin to operate the accelerator, kills him.

Amos and Sarah rescue Julia from the freezer. Sarah begins to suspect the killer cookie is Millard reincarnated. Outside, Lorna discovers her father’s corpse sprawled over the car hood. She steals his ring and reenters the bakery, only to trigger a tripwire that drives a knife into her forehead.

Sarah and Amos confess their feelings for each other before trying to rescue Betty from the oven. The Gingerdead Man locks Sarah inside and knocks Amos unconscious. Amos recovers and saves Sarah.

Brick returns to help, but the Gingerdead Man grabs Amos’s pistol and starts shooting. Julia and Brick manage to subdue him, and Brick bites off the cookie’s head. However, this allows the Gingerdead Man to possess Brick, who attacks Sarah. Amos and Julia ultimately push Brick into the oven and crank the heat to full, destroying the cookie.

Later, Betty and Amos hold a bake sale to raise money for the hospital, assisted by two nurses. Two children ask for gingerbread cookies, and a nurse mentions an older lady recently dropped some off.

One of the cookies is purchased by a woman, along with a box of pastries, which she plans to send to her sister in Los Angeles, setting the stage for the sequel.

== Cast ==
- Gary Busey as Millard Findlemeyer / The Gingerdead Man
- Robin Sydney as Sarah Leigh
- Ryan Locke as Amos Cadbury
- Alexia Aleman as Lorna Dean
- Jonathan Chase as 'Brick' Fields
- Margaret Blye as Betty Leigh
- Daniela Melgoza as Julia
- Newell Alexander as James Leigh
- James Snyder as Jeremy Leigh
- Larry Cedar as Jimmy Dean
- E. Dee Biddlecome as Millard's Mother
- Debra Mayer as Nurse #1
- Kaycee Shank as Nurse #2

== Production ==
The Gingerdead Man originated from a rejected pitch for a Mad TV sketch. Writer William Butler had proposed an idea involving a gingerbread cookie coming to life and killing a family during Christmas time; however, a sketch involving a woman fighting the Snuggle bear mascot had aired around that time and the idea was considered too similar. The idea was revived with Full Moon Features during a meeting with Charles Band, where Buttler was asked what the goofiest idea he had ever thought of was. After hearing the concept, Band greenlit the film on the spot and said, "Good! You're filming it in a month. Go write a script." Around this time, a teaser trailer was released, revealing an estimated release window of Summer 2001. The film did not make this release window.

Ultimately, Full Moon was unable to use Butler's script, as the estimated production cost was around three million dollars. Band and Butler later reached a deal where Full Moon bought the script and rewrote it in order to lower the budget. The script was rewritten by Domonic Muir under the pseudonym August White. According to Butler, almost nothing from his original script was kept, except for a few minor gags, such as the idea of the Gingerdead man driving a car.

In Butler's original version, The Gingerdead Man was intended to be a fully CGI character, resembling the Pillsbury Doughboy; however, with the rewrite, the design was changed to more closely resemble an actual gingerbread man cookie. The character was achieved with practical hand and rod puppets, as well as a full-body suit, created by John Carl Buechler.

In an interview with PopHorror.com, Band reportedly offered Gary Busey $25,000 to star in the film, expecting him to turn it down but he accepted. Busey filmed his scenes as Millard Findlemeyer in two days. This reportedly upset him when he learned he was only booked for such a small amount of time, as he misunderstood and assumed he was supposed to appear in person throughout the entire film and the two days was the entire filming schedule. His agent was later informed that this was not the case and that most of his lines would be dubbed with ADR.

== Reception ==
The horror website Bloody Good Horror gave the film a negative review, stating "It's one of the shortest, yet hardest to watch, films I've ever seen." Criticisms were directed at the film's humor and its writing.

According to Horror Society this film lacks a plot and makes very little sense. The review stated the "acting was atrocious" and "insanely stupefied."

Like many other Full Moon properties, the film spawned a franchise of sequels, crossovers, shorts, and comic books, as well as merchandise.

The Gingerdead Man was featured as one of the films in 13 Nights of Elvira.

=== Sequels and crossover film ===
On October 9, 2007, it was revealed that Gingerdead Man 2: Passion of the Crust had begun shooting. It was released in 2008. It included new monsters called "Tiny Terrors" (a pun on the unreleased Puppet Master Bobblehead line and an homage to the Full Moon’s many “killer toy“ properties)

On July 16, 2008, Charles Band announced a third film, Gingerdead Man 3: Saturday Night Cleaver. The film was slated for a 2009 release, but filming was delayed until January 2010. The film was released on September 13, 2011, and sees the Gingerdead Man travel back in time to slash his way through a Roller Disco Competition.

In 2013 Gingerdead Man vs. Evil Bong was released serving as the fourth film in the Gingerdead Man series while also being a crossover with the Evil Bong films. It follows the Gingerdead Man’s quest for vengeance on survivor Sarah Leigh.

A fifth movie titled Gingerdead Man: Rebaked! was announced in a pre-credits teaser in Evil Bong 666 (2017), but was never made. Instead, the fifth film was reworked into a new film titled The Gingerweed Man, acting as both the ninth installment of the Evil Bong film series and the fifth installment of the Gingerdead Man film series, which released in 2021.

=== Prominence in the Evil Bong series ===
Starting with Gingerdead Man vs. Evil Bong, The Gingerdead Man serves as a reoccurring antagonist, appearing in Evil Bong 420 as the main antagonist and Evil Bong High-5! as a supporting character, returning in Evil Bong 666 as the secondary antagonist. The character Sarah Leigh also becomes a supporting character in the Evil Bong series going forward, and is referred to in Evil Bong 666 and 777 as Faux Batty Boop.

He's also the overarching antagonist of Evil Bong 777 though remaining dead the entire film. He had a minor cameo at the end of Evil Bong 888: Infinity High.

=== Comic books ===
On December 7, 2015, Action Lab Comics and Full Moon Features announced a new comic book series based on the cult classic films. The first issue, The Gingerdead Man: Baking Bad #1, was written by Brockton McKinney (Ehmm Theory, Killer Queen), with art by Sergio Rios, and variant covers by the creator of Zombie Tramp, Dan Mendoza. Issue #1 of The Gingerdead Man: Baking Bad launched on February 3, 2016. The series serves as a loose sequel to the first Gingerdead Man film but largely ignores its continuity.

Another comic series was released on March 28, 2018, by Action Lab Comics titled The Gingerdead Man Meets Evil Bong, a crossover with the Evil Bong films. It is loosely inspired by the crossover film Gingerdead Man vs. Evil Bong and is a sequel to the Gingerdead Man: Baking Bad series. The comic is also written by Brockton McKinney with the artwork being done by Sergio Rios. The comic series consists of only three issues. On May 30, 2018, a volume of all three issues was released.

The Gingerdead Man appears in the fifth issue of Dollman Kills the Full Moon Universe, a crossover comic featuring Brick Bardo from Dollman tracking down different Full Moon monsters and villains to kill, published by Full Moon Comix in 2018.

=== Merchandise ===
Trick or Treat Studios released a full head mask of the Gingerdead Man in collaboration with Full Moon Features. The mask was designed by special makeup effects artist Tom Devlin.

Full Moon would later release an 8.75 inch tall resin statue of the Gingerdead Man that is available for purchase on their online market place Full Moon Direct.

In celebration of the release of Gingerdead Man vs. Evil Bong, a limited edition cereal box was made available that depicts the titular characters on opposite sides of the box in with unique artwork. It comes with the DVD of the movie along with special features, and multi-grain cereal called "Nookie Crisp" or "Weedies" in reference to the characters.

=== Home media ===
The Gingerdead Man was released on DVD on November 8, 2005, with a limited edition VHS in collaboration with Retro Release Video.

The film was released on Blu-ray for the first time on August 13, 2024, featuring remastered visuals and the behind-the-scenes bonus feature that was previously exclusive to the VHS. The Blu-ray can be purchased individually or as part of a box set that also includes Blu-ray editions of the sequels, the crossover, and the spin-off The Gingerweed Man. A special edition Blu-ray was also released in 2025 titled the Gingerdead Man: Murder-Thon containing highlights of the series edited into one film.
