= Full Moon Features =

American motion picture company

- Formerly: Full Moon Entertainment (1989–2005)
- Type: Private
- Founded: 1988; 38 years ago
- Founder: Charles Band
- Headquarters: Los Angeles, California, United States
- Key people: Charles Band (CEO)
- Products: See § Notable releases
- Services: Film production; Film distribution
- Divisions: Torchlight Entertainment; Moonbeam Entertainment
- Website: fullmoonfeatures.com

Full Moon Features (formerly Full Moon Entertainment; stylized in all caps) is an American independent motion picture production and distribution company headed by B-movie veteran Charles Band. It is known for the direct-to-video series Puppet Master, Trancers, and Subspecies, as well as the film Castle Freak and the VideoZone featurette through 1989 to 2013.

== History ==
=== Full Moon Productions era (1988–1995) ===
Full Moon Entertainment (1989–1995) logo

After the collapse of Band's previous film studio Empire Pictures, he moved back to the United States from Rome and opened Full Moon Productions. Band's goal with Full Moon was to create low-budget horror, sci-fi, and fantasy films while retaining a somewhat "big-budget" look. In the United States, Canada, and several foreign territories, from the company's very humble beginnings, Full Moon teamed with Paramount Pictures and Pioneer Home Entertainment for direct-to-video releasing on VHS and LaserDisc and the first release was the feature film directed by David Schmoeller, Puppet Master in 1989, and designed to create the company under the umbrella of Bandcompany, Inc. He additionally set up its label, Phantom Video, used to distribute cult movies on videocassette.

Puppet Master turned out to be a huge hit for Full Moon. Following the film on VHS and LaserDisc was a featurette entitled No Strings Attached, which documents the making of Puppet Master. It then featured interviews with cast and crew members, including actor Paul Le Mat and Charles Band himself. The next three releases—Shadowzone, Meridian: Kiss of the Beast, and Crash and Burn (changing to Full Moon Entertainment with the release of the latter)—all featured a making-of presentation after the film. Paramount, however, didn't believe in the making-of concept and forced Band to pay for all of the additional tape needed. At the same time, Band also reissued two catalog titles, Tourist Trap and Parasite through Paramount.

Some controversy arose, however, many years after the release of Puppet Master. In an interview on the website The Terror Trap, Puppet Master director, David Schmoeller, says that Charles Band owes him residuals, as well as stating that Charles Band doesn't give credit to directors. Schmoeller continues, saying that Band didn't want him on the director's commentary on the DVD release of Puppet Master, because "it would reveal that someone else shared in the creation of Full Moon's biggest and most successful franchise."

With the fifth Full Moon release Puppet Master II in 1991, Full Moon introduced VideoZone, a behind-the-scenes video magazine. The average VideoZone featured an introduction by Charles Band, the making-of the "movie you just watched," an interview with someone involved in a future Full Moon release, merchandise (such as Full Moon T-shirts, posters and other assorted goods), trailers, and contact information. VideoZone tied together the "comic book feel" that Band insisted with the Full Moon product. In 1992, Full Moon decided to expand into theatrical film production, with a distribution agreement at Paramount Pictures, to release two films, but it was never materialized.

Moonbeam Entertainment Logo

Full Moon continued producing its releases throughout the early 1990s (sometimes as many as twelve releases a year) and in 1993 founded two more labels: Torchlight Entertainment, specializing in softcore pornographic sci-fi comedies and Moonbeam Entertainment, specializing in family science fiction and fantasy films. Torchlight's first release was Beach Babes From Beyond; Moonbeam's was Prehysteria!, which actually became a high seller for distributor Paramount and was one of the first Full Moon films to be sold as an inexpensive sell-through product (as most Full Moon features were sold on VHS as rental items with prices upwards of $100 for each tape). Full Moon has also set up the Moonstone Records, and film and trading cards based on the company's own properties.

=== Full Moon Studios era (1995–2002) ===
In 1995, due to the direct-to-video market losing interest and financial ground with the rental market in addition to internal issues, Full Moon Entertainment separated from distributor Paramount. Full Moon's Halloween 1995 production Castle Freak was released on video unrated. Castle Freak was eventually released in November 1995 in both R-rated and unrated versions.

After the releases of Castle Freak and Oblivion 2: Backlash, Band renamed Full Moon Entertainment, Full Moon Studios for the feature Vampire Journals and used the name Full Moon Pictures for the following film Hideous!. Band continued to distribute all films on his own under then name of Amazing Fantasy Entertainment until around 1999 when some of the films were distributed by The Kushner-Locke Company. In 1997, Bobby Young, who had joined Full Moon two years earlier, has left to start Dominion Entertainment.

With the release of Shrieker in 1998, Band enlisted the help of Ohio-based filmmaker and Tempe Entertainment founder, J. R. Bookwalter, who had recently relocated to California. Bookwalter was commissioned by Band to begin editing features, including Curse of the Puppet Master. Curse of the Puppet Master was created primarily out of market demand and isn't held in high regard with fans of the genre. To conserve costs (as most Full Moon features were being made for much less than the Paramount-distributed films), the film was put together using footage from the first five Puppet Master files, as well as some new footage. However, Bookwalter's work got Full Moon noticed on Apple.com where a story was published about Bookwalter's editing of Curse of the Puppet Master on his iBook in a hotel room in Ohio.

Over the next several years, Full Moon continued its releases and even introduced more labels:

- Alchemy Entertainment/Big City Pictures – specializing in urban horror and science-fiction films.
- Surrender Cinema – replacing Torchlight Entertainment, specializing in the same soft-core science fiction as Torchlight.
- Cult Video – mainly used to re-release old pre-Empire and Empire-era Band films.
- Pulp Fantasy Productions – New films that don't fit the usual Full Moon mold.
- Pulsepounders – Replacing Moonbeam Entertainment, specializing in science fiction and fantasy films for families.
- Monster Island Entertainment - Making films about giant monsters.

Bookwalter would eventually get the chance to direct a Full Moon film with the sequel to Witchouse, Witchouse 2: Blood Coven. It was Bookwalter's first film on 35 mm and with it opened a new door for Bookwalter's Tempe Entertainment.

Starting with Horror Vision, Tempe Entertainment was hired to produce several Full Moon films for Band. All of these films were shot on DV, a first for Full Moon and were primarily made for under $60,000 (with Witchouse 3: Demon Fire completed for $26,000). The films were produced under very tight schedules, some being shot in as little as nine days. While the production drawbacks were high in each situation, this opportunity gave new exposure to Bookwalter and Tempe who was accustomed to producing films on shoestring budgets. On January 16, 2001, Full Moon decided to launch a TV show with William Shatner attached as host, presenting various Full Moon pictures.

Once again, the industry changed and Band decided to end the Full Moon label with the 2002 release of Jigsaw. In 2001, Full Moon decided to bow out of theatrical distribution, and decided to focus back to straight-to-video films.

During this era of Full Moon, Band secured a weekly television series on the Sci Fi Channel called William Shatner's Full Moon Fright Night. Veteran actor, William Shatner, hosted Full Moon films with wraparounds, as well as interviews with many of sci-fi's most notable personalities, including Stan Lee and Jeffrey Combs. Tempe also received exposure here as HorrorVision was included in this short-lived series.

With the release of 2000's The Dead Hate the Living!, Band dropped the VideoZone name and produced behind-the-scenes featurettes without a masthead.

=== Shadow Films era (2002–2004) ===
Shadow Films Logo

Blockbuster Entertainment, a longtime supporter of the Full Moon brand requested the company produce a slasher film, due to the late '90s resurgence of this subgenre, thanks to Scream and I Know What You Did Last Summer. With the help of an uncredited Tempe Entertainment, Band produced Bleed and acquired Keith Walley's Scared, renaming it Cut Throat.

Band produced only two more films "officially" under the Shadow name: (Birthrite, Delta Delta Die!). Another Keith Walley film Speck was acquired. William Shatner's DV science-fiction movie Groom Lake, produced by J. R. Bookwalter became notorious as one of the most-expensive films of the modern era of Full Moon.

Wizard Video Logo

Band also decided around this time to bring back an old label used in the Empire era named Wizard Video, which distributed cult-like films. This modern rendition saw the release of Tempe's Skinned Alive and Ozone (renamed Street Zombies for the Wizard release). However, due to low sales, another Tempe film Bloodletting (which was also renamed: I've Killed Before) was dropped from the release schedule.

In 2003, Charles Band entered into a deal with 20th Century Fox to produce a low budget horror movie. Fox would distribute the movie and Band would retain copyrights. The film was directed by J. R. Bookwalter and named Deadly Stingers. In the tradition of the giant killer bug movies, Deadly Stingers was about giant scorpions taking over a town. However, after the film was completed, it was shelved due to a decline in the industry and low sales of another similar project at Fox (excluding Full Moon) entitled Dark Wolf. The film was shown at the Frightvision Horror Festival in 2003, but while it has surfaced on Full Moon Streaming as of December 2013 under the name of Mega Scorpions, it has yet to see a release on DVD or Blu-ray. A teaser trailer for the film does exist on J. R. Bookwalter's Tempe Entertainment website.

=== The second Full Moon Pictures era (2004–present) ===
In late 2003, Band began work on his first 35 mm film in years, Dr. Moreau's House of Pain. The film released in January 2004 also marked the official return of the name Full Moon Pictures. However, while the film's video releases all contain the name of Shadow Entertainment, the film's trailer contains the Full Moon Pictures logo.

Quickly before the release of Dr. Moreau's House of Pain, Full Moon released Puppet Master: The Legacy, a "greatest hits" film that contained the best scenes from all (hitherto) seven Puppet Master films with about 20 minutes of a wrap-around story and very bad puppet effects (string rods can be seen in almost every scene featuring the puppets). Once again, all video releases said Shadow Entertainment, but the trailer featured the Full Moon Pictures logo.

On the heels of Puppet Master: The Legacy, Band quickly cut together Tomb of Terror, Horrific and Urban Evil. These three films edited by HorrorVision director, Danny Draven, were clip shows that showed off the best in Full Moon's library.

After the release of those films, Band re-christened the Full Moon name to Full Moon Features. Full Moon Features intends to take more time making films with considerably higher budgets and on 35 mm film and as of July 2006 has focused on that with the exceptions of When Puppets and Dolls Attack!, Monsters Gone Wild! and Aliens Gone Wild! (all clip shows).

In 2005, Charles Band embarked on the Full Moon Horror Roadshow, a traveling, live Full Moon-inspired show featuring Band and actors/actresses from past Full Moon films. Some shows also featured his son, Alex Band. At all shows, Band offered a contest for a chance for a member of the audience to have a part in a future Full Moon feature. As of 2009, none of these winners had received their roles. However, on August 27, 2009, Band blogged that those who were chosen would have the opportunity to be cast in his next project. Band continued the roadshow in 2006, this time putting it in smaller venues. A similar contest offering a part in a movie was held at these events. In 2011, contest winners were contacted for the chance to be extras in the movie Gingerdead Man 3: Saturday Night Cleaver. Available winners who could make it to the set were featured as extras in the movie during a mass electrocution scene at a roller rink. Full Moon uploaded pictures of the contest winners onset on its official Facebook page.

In 2009, Band hopes to expand Full Moon to a similar release schedule more like the mid-1990s with a new release every month. Additionally, the company plans to add sequels to many franchises, including Puppet Master, Demonic Toys, and Head of the Family.

In 2012, the Videozone was brought back, making its return on the DVD release of Puppet Master X: Axis Rising. In addition, the Moonbeam Entertainment brand label was revived under the name Moonbeam Films.

The studio's nearly thirty-year history is covered in the book It Came From the Video Aisle written by Dave Jay, William S. Wilson, and Torsten Dewi and published by Schiffer Publishing in October 2017.

== Notable releases ==
- Puppet Master – Full Moon's first franchise, inspired from an earlier Empire film, Dolls, and United Artists' success with Child's Play the year prior. Spawned seven sequels: Puppet Master II, Puppet Master III: Toulon's Revenge, Puppet Master 4 and Puppet Master 5: The Final Chapter during the Full Moon Entertainment era, Curse of the Puppet Master and Retro Puppet Master during the Full Moon Pictures era, and Puppet Master: The Legacy during the Full Moon Features era. A made-for-TV crossover film titled Puppet Master vs. Demonic Toys was on Sci Fi Channel in 2004, under Shadow Entertainment. A trilogy of standalone prequels were released in the 2010s: Axis of Evil (2010), Axis Rising (2012) and Axis Termination (2017). A reboot, The Littlest Reich, was released in 2018, with a spin-off, Blade: The Iron Cross, focused on the puppet Blade, in 2020. A second spin-off, Doktor Death, based on the eponymous character from Retro, was released in 2022.
- Subspecies – Full Moon's take on vampires. It currently consists of Subspecies, Bloodstone: Subspecies II, Bloodlust: Subspecies III and Subspecies 4: Bloodstorm (released during the Full Moon Pictures era). Fans of the series also consider the spin-off Vampire Journals as an entry as well, despite being non-canon. A fifth entry and prequel, Blood Rise: Subspecies V was released in 2023.
- Trancers – A carry over from Band's days at Empire, under the Full Moon name, he produced II, III, 4 and 5. A sixth installment was created by Johnnie J. Young and Jay Woelfel's Young Wolf Productions and was distributed by Band under the Full Moon Pictures label.
- Killjoy – Focuses on the titular Killjoy, a demonic clown who is summoned to assist revenge plots in all three films, only to prove too overwhelming for each character who calls him. Two follow-ups, entitled Goes to Hell (2012) and Psycho Circus (2016), take the series in a whole new direction.
- Demonic Toys – A knock-off of Puppet Master, created a cross-sequel called Dollman vs. Demonic Toys featuring characters from Demonic Toys, Dollman and Bad Channels. Succeeded by Demonic Toys: Personal Demons (2010) and the character centered Baby Oopsie (2021) and Jack Attack (2023).
- Doctor Mordrid – Bears striking resemblance to Marvel Comics' Doctor Strange, though screenwriter C. Courtney Joyner denies any connection; one of Full Moon's "flashier" films.
- Dragonworld – Released by Moonbeam Entertainment, and directed by Ted Nicolaou (of Subspecies), a young child named John McGowan has moved to Scotland after losing his parents in a traffic accident. He befriends a dragon, who he names "Yowler". A sequel, The Legend Continues was released by Kushner-Locke in the United States under the title Shadow of the Knight.
- The Pit and the Pendulum – Directed by Re-Animator's Stuart Gordon, a retelling of the classic Edgar Allan Poe story.
- Prehysteria! – A trilogy of kid-oriented sci-fi comedy films about mini-dinosaurs that come to life. Produced under Moonbeam Entertainment.
- The Dead Hate the Living! – Full Moon's first zombie film, received notable coverage in various horror magazines.
- Groom Lake – William Shatner's show about a dying woman who receives a visit from aliens; only notable given the name and the stories behind it, as the film received mostly negative reviews.
- The Gingerdead Man – One of the latest Full Moon franchises, with the first installment starring Gary Busey, who plays a criminal who is sent to the electric chair, comes back to life as a Gingerbread Man, and goes out to kill the woman who sent him to jail. Followed by Passion of the Crust, and Saturday Night Cleaver, released in 2011. A crossover, Gingerdead Man vs. Evil Bong, was released in 2013. The series is very much played with a tongue-in-cheek mentality.
- Evil Bong - The Newest Full Moon franchise, Evil Bong is a horror comedy film series focused on a group of stoners as they battle an evil Bong named Eebee. It was followed by the eponymous first film Evil Bong in 2006, two sequels Evil Bong 2: King Bong in 2009, and Evil Bong 3D: The Wrath of Bong released in 2011. A crossover with Gingerdead Man released in 2013 under the name Gingerdead Man vs. Evil Bong. Much like Gingerdead Man, It was followed by four more sequels, Evil Bong 420 in 2015, Evil Bong High-5! in 2016, Evil Bong 666 in 2017, and Evil Bong 777 in 2018, Including a spin-off in 2021 titled The Gingerweed Man. The tenth and final film, Evil Bong 888: Infinity High was released on May 20, 2022. The series is played with a tongue-in-cheek mentality.
- The Primevals - Directed by David W. Allen, and written by him alongside Randall William Cook (visual effects artist known for working on the Lord of the Rings films). It is a science fiction, fantasy and adventure film, that pays homage to the films of said genres from the 40's and 50's. The film had a fairly long development due to financial problems, including the death of its director, which led to it being archived due to the inability to complete post-production. That was until Charles Band decided to revive the project in 2018 with Chris Endicott, who had worked with Allen on other Full Moon projects in the 90s. They finished production in 2023. This film ended up being one of the production company's films with the most stop motion produced.
