= Charles Band =

American film director (born 1951)

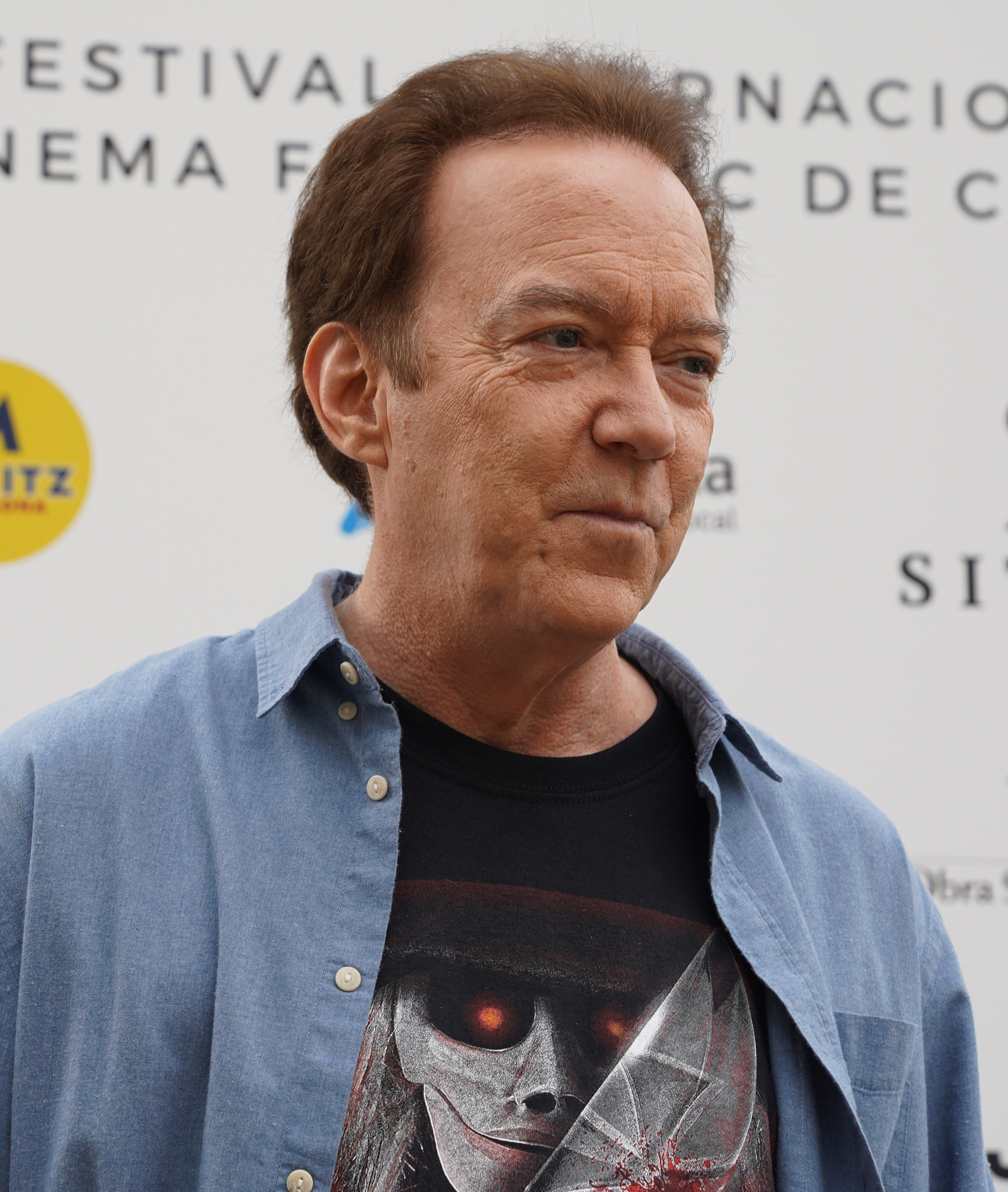
- Band at Festival de Cinema de Sitges in 2019
- Born: Charles Robert Band; December 27, 1951 (age 74); Los Angeles, California, U.S.
- Other names: Carlo Bokino; Robert Talbot; James Amante
- Occupations: Film producer, film director
- Years active: 1973–present
- Spouses: Meda Robertson (m. 1977; div. 1983); Debra Dion (m. 1984; div. 2004) Robin Sydney (m. 2023)
- Children: 4, including Alex Band
- Father: Albert Band
- Relatives: Richard Band (brother)
- Website: charlesband.com

Charles Robert Band (born December 27, 1951) is an American film producer and director, known for his work on horror comedy movies.

== Career ==
Band entered film production in the 1970s with Charles Band Productions. Dissatisfied with distributors' handling of his movies, he formed Empire Pictures in 1983. At its height, Empire would release an average of two films a month, one theatrically and one on home video. Movies released by Empire included Ghoulies and Ghoulies II, and the cult classic Re-Animator.

Empire folded in 1988, due to financial difficulties. Band would found Full Moon Productions the same year. Full Moon releases include the Puppet Master and Subspecies series. Full Moon's family-oriented label Moonbeam Entertainment released the Prehysteria! trilogy.

In 2021, Harper Collins published Band's best-selling autobiography Confessions of a Puppetmaster, charting his entire history in the business to date.

== Personal life ==
Band was born in Los Angeles, California. He is Jewish. He is the son of director-producer Albert Band, and brother of composer Richard Band. Band's grandfather was the painter Max Band. With his former wife Meda, Band had two children, including Alex, the vocalist for the band The Calling. He had two sons with his former wife Debra Dion. Band is currently married to actress Robin Sydney.

== Filmography ==
=== As director ===
- Last Foxtrot in Burbank (1973, as Carlo Bokino)
- Crash! (1977)
- Parasite (1982)
- Metalstorm: The Destruction of Jared-Syn (1983)
- The Alchemist (1983, as James Amante)
- The Dungeonmaster (1984, segment "Heavy Metal")
- Trancers (1984)
- Pulse Pounders (1988)
- Meridian: Kiss of the Beast (1990)
- Crash and Burn (1990)
- Trancers II (1991)
- Doctor Mordrid (1992)
- Prehysteria! (1993)
- Dollman vs. Demonic Toys (1993)
- Head of the Family (1996, as Robert Talbot)
- Mystery Monsters (1997, as Robert Talbot)
- Hideous! (1997)
- The Creeps (1997)
- Blood Dolls (1999)
- NoAngels.com (2000)
- Full Moon Fright Night (2002, TV Series)
- Puppet Master: The Legacy (2003)
- Dr. Moreau's House of Pain (2004)
- Decadent Evil Dead (2005)
- Doll Graveyard (2005)
- The Gingerdead Man (2005)
- Petrified (2006)
- Evil Bong (2006)
- The Haunted Casino (2007)
- Decadent Evil Dead II (2007)
- Dangerous Chucky Dolls (2008)
- Evil Bong II: King Bong (2009)
- Skull Heads (2009)
- Evil Bong 3-D: The Wrath of Bong (2011)
- Killer Eye: Halloween Haunt (2011)
- DevilDolls (2012)
- The Dead Want Women (2012)
- Puppet Master X: Axis Rising (2012)
- Ooga Booga (2013)
- Blood of 1000 Virgins (2013, Documentary)
- Nazithon: Decadence and Destruction (2013, Documentary)
- Unlucky Charms (2013)
- Bada$$ Mothaf**kas (2013, Documentary)
- Gingerdead Man vs. Evil Bong (2013)
- The Haunted Dollhouse (2013)
- Trophy Heads (2014)
- Evil Bong 420 (2015)
- Kings of Cult (2015, Documentary)
- Evil Bong: High 5 (2016)
- Ravenwolf Towers: The Feature (2016)
- Ravenwolf Towers (2016, TV Series)
- Fists of Fury (2016)
- Evil Bong 666 (2017)
- Puppet Master: Axis Termination (2017)
- Evil Bong 777 (2018)
- Bunker of Blood: Chapter 2 - Deadly Dolls: Deepest Cuts (2018)
- Death Heads: Brain Drain (2018)
- Vampire Slaughter: Eaten Alive (2018)
- Bunker of Blood: Chapter 6: Zombie Lust: Night Flesh (2018)
- Bunker of Blood: Chapter 8: Butcher's Bake Off: Hell's Kitchen (2018)
- Corona Zombies (2020)
- Barbie & Kendra Save the Tiger King (2020)
- Barbie & Kendra Storm Area 51 (2020)
- Evil Bong 888: Infinity High (2022)
- Barbie & Kendra Crash Joe Bob’s Drive-in Jamboree! (2024)
- Robotica (2026)
- Barbenheimer (TBA)

== List of Full Moon films ==
=== Charles Band Productions ===
- Last Foxtrot in Burbank (1973)
- Mansion of the Doomed (1975)
- Cinderella (1977)
- Crash! (1977)
- End of the World (1977)
- Auditions (1978)
- Laserblast (1978)
- Fairy Tales (1978)
- Tourist Trap (1979)
- The Day Time Ended (1980)
- The Best of Sex and Violence (1980)
- Famous T&A (1982)
- Parasite (1982)
- Metalstorm: The Destruction of Jared-Syn (1983)
- Filmgore (1983)

=== Empire ===
- The Alchemist (1983)
- The Dungeonmaster (1984)
- Ghost Warrior (1984)
- Trancers (1984)
- Ghoulies (1985)
- Re-Animator (1985)
- Savage Island (1985)
- Underworld (1985)
- Walking the Edge (1985)
- Zone Troopers (1985)
- Breeders (1986)
- Crawlspace (1986)
- Dreamaniac (1986)
- Eliminators (1986)
- From Beyond (1986)
- Necropolis (1986)
- Rawhead Rex (1986)
- Robot Holocaust (1986)
- Troll (1986)
- TerrorVision (1986)
- Vicious Lips (1986)
- The Caller (1987)
- Creepozoids (1987)
- Dolls (1987)
- Enemy Territory (1987)
- Mutant Hunt (1987)
- The Princess Academy (1987)
- Ghoulies II (1987)
- Prison (1987)
- Valet Girls (1987)
- Assault of the Killer Bimbos (1988)
- Buy & Cell (1988)
- Catacombs (1988)
- Cellar Dweller (1988)
- Ghost Town (1988)
- Pulse Pounders (1988)
- Sorority Babes in the Slimeball Bowl-O-Rama (1988)
- Transformations (1988)
- Arena (1989)
- Deadly Weapon (1989)
- Intruder (1989)
- Robot Jox (1989)
- Spellcaster (1989)

=== Pulp Fantasy ===
- Head of the Family (1996)
- The Killer Eye (1998)
- Killer Eye: Halloween Haunt (2011)

=== Action Xtreme ===
- Alien Arsenal (1999)
- Murdercycle (1999)

=== Filmonsters! ===
- Frankenstein Reborn! (1998)
- The Werewolf Reborn! (1998)

=== Alchemy Entertainment/Big City Pictures ===
- Ragdoll (1999)
- The Horrible Dr. Bones (2000)
- Killjoy (2000)
- The Vault (2001)
- Cryptz (2002)
- Killjoy 2: Deliverance from Evil (2002)

== Bibliography ==
- Confessions of a Puppetmaster: A Hollywood Memoir of Ghouls, Guts, and Gonzo Filmmaking (2021, with Adam Felber)
