= Evil Bong =

- Teaser poster
- Directed by: Charles Band
- Screenplay by: August White
- Story by: Charles Band
- Produced by: Executive Producer; Dana Harrloe; Thomas Smead (Co-Executive Producer); Cristina Childers and Andrew Austin
- Starring: David Weidoff; John Patrick Jordan; Mitch Eakins
- Cinematography: Mac Ahlberg
- Music by: District 78
- Production company: Talos Entertainment
- Distributed by: Full Moon Features
- Release date: October 24, 2006
- Running time: 86 minutes
- Country: United States
- Language: English

Evil Bong is a 2006 American stoner horror comedy film directed by Charles Band about a group of stoners who smoke from a sentient, malevolent bong that traps the smoker in The Bong World, a surreal realm filled with killer strippers and other Full Moon creatures. The ending features an extended cameo by Tommy Chong, of Cheech & Chong fame. Brandi Cunningham from VH1's Rock of Love with Bret Michaels and horror icon Bill Moseley also make appearances in the film, which spawned a franchise of sequels.

== Plot ==
Nerdy college student Alistair McDowell moves in with law school drop-out Larnell, and his current roommates typical "surfer-stoner" Bachman and former baseball player Brett. When Larnell sees an ad for a large bong that the previous owner claims was "possessed", he responds. They receive the bong and start smoking (with the exception of Alistair). Alistair meets Brett's girlfriend Luann and her friend Janet, who Alistair develops a crush on.

Later that night, Bachman's soul is pulled into The Bong World, which takes the form of a hellish strip club, inside Evil Bong, where he meets Ooga Booga and Ivan Burroughs, who warns him to watch himself around the Evil Bong. He is introduced to one of the strippers (Kristen Caldwell) who has skulls on her bra that start biting his neck, killing him, while Ooga Booga watches on, masturbating. The next morning, the other roommates find Bachman dead on the couch. Alistair tells them that it is probably from the weed, but Larnell points out they all smoked the weed. Larnell also notices that the bong has changed; a face has started to appear. The trio hide his body and are nearly caught when Larnell's paralyzed, wealthy grandfather, Cyril, comes by to tell Larnell that he just got remarried.

Later on, the bong (voiced by Michele Mais) starts speaking to Larnell (to Larnell only, no one else hears) and tempts him to smoke from her, which he does. Pulled into the Bong World, he sees Bachman (who seems to be fine), the Gingerdead Man, and Cyril. Eventually a stripper gives Larnell a lap dance, and he is killed in a similar way that Bachman was killed. Back in the real world, Luann and Janet come over and the group (again with the exception of Alistair) smokes from the bong. After Brett and Luann pass out, they wake up in the same strip club and they are greeted by Jack Attack, and Luann is taken away by the bouncer. Brett is then treated by his ex-girlfriend Carla Brewster, a stripper in the Bong World. She eventually uses her lip-cupped bra to bite off Brett's genitals, killing him.

Meanwhile, when Alistair starts figuring out what is going on, Janet falls prey to the bong and passes out. Jimbo Leary (Tommy Chong) enters and proclaims that the bong, named Eebee, is his and has a voodoo curse on it: once one takes enough hits from it, it brings one to the Bong World where it kills the smoker. In order to save Janet, Alistair enters the bong world. Meanwhile, Jimbo tries destroying the bong with a hammer, chainsaw, and (resorting to drastic measures) a bomb. Eebee unleashes a cloud of marijuana smoke, causing Jimbo to pass out.

Meanwhile, in the Bong World, Eebee forces the strippers to seduce Alistair, but he breaks them off. During his search, he bumps into Jack Deth. Once he finds a stoned Janet, Eebee reveals her motives: to control the world by turning the air into pot smoke and the oceans into bong water, making everyone massive stoners. They take "vitamins" (that Jimbo gave them) to make them sober again. Jimbo, who has just got sucked into the bong world, tells them to go ahead and escape while he takes care of Eebee. Jimbo shows Eebee the time bomb strapped to his chest. He activates the bomb and blows up Eebee. Back in the real world, the gang has their souls returned and everyone comes back to life. However, Jimbo has been apparently killed, along with the bong, which is now shattered into pieces. The final scene shows that Jimbo is now the "king" of the Bong World.

== Cast ==
- John Patrick Jordan as Larnell, a stereotypical stoner, and the main character of the Evil Bong film series. Though absent in 666, 777 and The Gingerweed Man, he returned in Evil Bong 888.
- David Weidoff as Alistair McDowell, a nerdy science student who is Larnell, Bachman, and Brett's new roommate. In the next two movies he is played by another actor.
- Mitch Eakins as Bachman, a stereotypical "surfer" and stoner.
- Brian Lloyd as Brett, a stereotypical jock. Together with Bachman he is starring in the next two movies of the franchise.
- Robin Sydney as Luann, Brett's attractive girlfriend. She is in all of the Evil Bong movies (later getting a new personality), except of the last one, where the same actress is playing Kendra.
- Kristyn Green as Janet.
- Tommy Chong as Jim "Jimbo" Leary, Eebee's longtime owner, discovers her in the Amazon
- Michelle Mais (voice) as Eebee, an Evil Bong who is awakened every time someone smokes from her. She gains power once she pulls a person into the Bong World and kills them.
- Jacob Witkin as Cyril Cornwallis, Larnell's grandfather, reliant on a wheelchair. He disapproves of his grandson in general and is recurring and vocal about it. He keeps starring in the next five movies about the Evil Bong.
- Phil Fondacaro as Ivan Burroughs.
- Tim Thomerson as Jack Deth.
- Bill Moseley as Bong World Patron.
- Brandi Cunningham as Carla Brewster.
- Dana Danes as Bong World Dancer.
- Gina-Raye Carter as Bong World Dancer.
- Sonny Carl Davis as "Rabbit", the delivery man; although Davis' role in this film is minor, he becomes a main character in the series. Though he is a main character in the film series, his first appearance was in the 1991 film Trancers II. Later he was also in the Gingerweed Man spin-off, and, together with Larnell and Luann, he was in Killjoy's Psycho Circus.
- Sylvester Terkay as Bouncer.
- Dale Dymkoski as Male Dancer.
- Mae LaBorde as Rosemary Cornwallis.
- John Carl Buechler as Gingerdead Man (puppeteer/voice)

== Production ==
The concept of Evil Bong was conceived when director Charles Band had a conversation with his sons about making a weed movie. Band jokingly thought of the title Evil Bong and decided to make it. The film was shot in seven days, with production starting only six weeks after the concept was conceived.

Ebee's design was based on a thirty-year-old bong prop that Band and actress Robin Sydney bought at a head shop. Jeff Farley of Obscure Artifacts recreated it and made three different face molds with varying levels of detail for the different transformation phases it goes through after being smoked from. The tubes connected to the bong were blown around with compressed air. Eebee's name is a play on the film's title, as it phonetically sounds like "EB," the abbreviation for Evil Bong.

For his cameo appearance as Jack Deth, Tim Thomerson wore the coat from his other Full Moon character, Dollman, as the original was no longer available, leading to comments from Trancers fans about the inconsistent color. Additionally, Thomerson only agreed to the cameo since he was friends with fellow castmate Tommy Chong.

John Carl Buechler replaced Gary Busey as the voice of the Gingerdead Man.

== Release ==
The original DVD release on October 24, 2006, includes a 20-minute behind-the-scenes special feature with the cast and crew. The special feature has been included on numerous subsequent DVD releases with its various sequels. The film also received a limited edition VHS in collaboration with Retro Release Video. Evil Bong was released on Blu-ray for the first time on Oct 05, 2021, in a box set called the Evil Bong Stash Box containing the first seven movies, the Gingerdead Man crossover and Weedjies: Halloweed Night. A special edition Blu-ray was also released in 2025 titled the Evil Bong-A-Thon, containing highlights of the series edited into one film.

== Soundtrack ==
Rare for a direct to DVD film, an associated soundtrack is available on Lakeshore Records and features music from Twiztid, Insane Clown Posse, Sen Dog (from Cypress Hill), and Volume 10 ("Pistol Grip Pump"). It also has music from the film's composers, District 78, and two tracks from music group Kottonmouth Kings.

== Reception ==
Dread Central published a positive review shortly after the film's release in 2006, saying that despite its flaws, "Evil Bong is an enjoyable little flick that truly harkens back to the early, glory days of Full Moon Pictures", but points out the horror is secondary to the film's comedy. The reviewer compares the humor in the film to that of a sitcom and furthers the comparison by pointing out that "the majority of the film is set in the living room of this one apartment (much like a sitcom)". Ultimately, the reviewer argues that the film "is the most well-paced movie Band has churned out in ages but even it hits a few lulls along the way due to the premise being too flimsy for both the running time and the film's limited budget". The review also covers the aspects of the DVD release and special features included.

Spectrum Culture reviewed the film in 2017, over a decade after its initial release. The review heavily criticized the film with particular criticism given to the characters who the reviewer calls "an onslaught of college douchebags" and for taking place largely in a singular location. The review also argues that the vernacular used by the stoners of the film would be considered "total narc lingo" by "any true High Times subscriber".

== Sequels ==
=== Evil Bong 2: King Bong (2009) ===
Sometime after they helped destroy Evil Bong, Eebee, college student Larnell finds Alister McDowell at his dorm room door, remarking "I almost didn't recognize you" (a reference to Alister's recasting). Larnell invites him in and explains something is wrong with him and his roommates Bachman, and Brett: Bachman has become narcoleptic followed by amnesia, Larnell has uncontrollable sexual urges, and Brett has become massively overweight due to an uncontrollable appetite.

The group decides to call the delivery man Rabbit, who first delivered Eebee. He arrives and after a brief interaction with Larnell, agrees to trade information for marijuana. He tells them Jimbo Leary bought the bong in the Amazon in the 1960s while working for the peace corps. When half his friends die after smoking from Eebee, Jimbo locked her in his attic where she stayed until his wife sold it, leading to the events of the first film. Believing they can find a cure, the five men travel to the Amazon. There, they encounter Velicity, a woman who is continuing her recently deceased-father's research with his research partner. Larnell and Rabbit discover a pile of marijuana behind Velicity's hut, packed to move. Guarding it is Velicity's partner, Larnell's grandfather Cyril, who is inexplicably out of his wheelchair and able to walk. Larnell and Rabbit go inside the hut where Velicity explains that her father uncovered a prehistoric strain of marijuana cultivated by an ancient people, "the Poontang Tribe". She has found that the marijuana can be used to help cure people of health problems and severe injuries-explaining how Cyril is able to walk again-and Velicity is planning on donating the marijuana to help cancer patients. Bachman suggests that the marijuana could help them with their extreme side effects, so they smoke some and it seems to work.

Larnell pulls out leftover pieces of Eebee's face which Velicity immediately recognizes as Poontang craftsmanship. Eebee is brought back to life by the ancient marijuana smoke and Velicity takes the pieces to Cyril. She overhears a phone call between Cyril and a potential buyer, so she confronts him. He chastises her for her naivety, and she runs off upset. Having heard Cyril's plan, Eebee offers her help if he helps restore her original form, which Cyril does. Rabbit shows up and tries to cut a distribution deal with Cyril, threatening to expose Cyril's intended operation if he does not cut him in, when three Poontang Tribeswomen appear behind them, holding spears. They attack Cyril (who runs off) and capture Rabbit and Eebee. The three women bring Rabbit and Eebee to King Bong even larger, skull-shaped bong with eyes. They place Eebee on an altar next to King Bong and they argue, revealing a past relationship. The women "force" Rabbit to smoke from the King Bong and he enters the Bong World. Cyril returns to the hut, bleeding, where he tells the others what happened. Larnell, Velicity, Alister, Bachman and Brett head out to save Rabbit leaving Cyril behind.

They find King Bong and theorize that he is more powerful than Eebee and has the ability to pull a person's whole being into the Bong World, not just their soul. Eebee, still being bitter from King Bong's implied infidelity, tells them they have to destroy his "symbol", a necklace and the source of his power. Bachman and Brett enter the Bong World (this time a jungle) and are danced on by two mostly nude tribeswomen before being tied up and brought before King Bong with Rabbit. Larnell and Alister enter find the tribe rolling Rabbit up in giant paper, turning him into a massive joint that King Bong shrinks down to a normal size with his necklace. They untie Bachman and Brett and the group attacks the tribe while Larnell shatters the necklace, destroying King Bong and sending them out of the Bong World. They all walk off, ignoring Eebee's angry cries to them not to leave her on the altar alone. The film ends with everyone smoking in Larnell's dorm, everything back to normal.

Evil Bong 3: Reefer Madness (2011), A galactic stoner comedy about survivors of a battle with King Bong whose Venice Beach head shop gets them enslaved by an alien’s sexy weed strain.

=== Evil Bong 3D: The Wrath of Bong (2011) ===
In the early morning hours on April 20, a man burying his wife in the woods and sees a meteor crash nearby. Investigating, he finds it is no meteor, but an alien capsule containing a large Space Bong, that he takes with him. Alistair McDowell, now working at the Space Institute, has been tracking the comet. He finds it in the woods and realizes it is not a comet. He is surprised by Larnell, who is apparently a Black Belt now and who initially does not recognize him (a reference to Alistair's 2nd recasting). He immediately pushes conspiracy theories on Al, claiming James Cameron is an alien and that all forms of government agencies are corrupt. He also explains he is running from the government, living off-grid and training in fighting with a "Ninja Master" Wong Dong, who is really just a car stereo thief. He convinces Al to help him find what he thinks is an alien bong, due to the marijuana residue on the object. The Killer Husband brings the Space Bong to a small smoke shop co-owned by Brett and Bachman and sells it to them. It is revealed that the alien marijuana he found on the meteor, has spread like a rash over his skin. Brett calls Al to see if he can tell them anymore about the bong. In a back room, Bachman smokes from Space Bong, who comes to life, and is pulled into Space Bong's Bong World, where he is set upon by mostly nude women.

Al and Larnell arrive to inspect the Bong. Brett notices the alien fungus has grown on things the Killer Husband touched and Al finds the same thing happening with his meteor samples. Just then, Rabbit, still a "practicing" priest shows up for a scheduled "study session" with Bachman, who has gone missing. Brett's ex-girlfriend, Luann, who he now avoids, briefly stops by. Rabbit's enticed into smoking from Space Bong who reveals his intentions to take over Earth. Larnell, Brett, and Al enter the back room in time to see Rabbit being sucked into the Bong World. Larnell suggests they contact his grandfather, Cyril (now a medical marijuana doctor going by Dr. Weed) who shows up with his assistant Nurse Hookah. Cyril, along with Evil Bong, Eebee, was ditched by the gang in the Amazon after defeating King Bong, and having escaped together, the two have since become friends and business partners. Space Bong insults Eebee, so she and Cyril agree to help the gang stop the alien invader, who thinks he can outsmart everyone. Larnell, Alistair and Eebee all enter Space Bongs Bong World while Nurse Hookah holds Brett hostage, per Cyril's orders, in case anything goes wrong.

Inside, Larnell and Eebee find Rabbit and Bachman hooked up to an alien contraption used to farm their sperm. Soon, Alistair finds himself trapped in one of the machines. Meanwhile, outside Bong World, Space Bong convinces Cyril that he is not an invader an simply a peaceful alien visitor. Brett overpowers Nurse Hookah and enters the Bong World. He finds Rabbit and Bachman, both milked dry and delirious, Bachman covered in the alien fungus. The trio find Eebee and Larnell trying to get Al out of the sperm extractor, whose sperm is more valuable to Space Bong since he is more intelligent. Larnell uses him fighting skills to take out the nude alien women and free Al, but the gang is still trapped in Space Bong's Bong World.

Eebee suggests they create a reverse entryway out of the Bong World by combining Space Bong's "female units" and smoke from alien-weed-covered Bachman, who they light on fire. After, he lights up a joint, the power of which causes Space Bong and his women to explode, returning the gang to Earth. Sometime later, Brett and Luann are back together, and the gang is hanging out at his shop. Larnell orders pizza, remarking on how he misses Velicity, who walks in with the pizza. She explains she lost her income after they destroyed King Bong and Cyril stopped employing her, so she has decided to stay with him. Brett is revealed to have some of the alien marijuana fungus growing on him, to Luann's dismay. In a final scene, Cyril and Nurse Hookah find the original meteor, the crash site now having been overgrown with the alien weed.

=== Gingerdead Man vs. Evil Bong (2013) ===
The Gingerdead Man is on a tropical island, being fanned by topless women. He ruminates on killing Sarah Leigh, the only person to best him, but does not know where she is. Suddenly, a newspaper blows by with information on Sarah's upcoming "Bake off" and he starts planning her demise. Note that Sarah is played by the same actress who played Luann in the first three movies.

Larnell now owns and operates "Dick's Head Shop" with girlfriend Velicity, and they briefly recount the events of the first three Evil Bong films in passing. In short: the gang is captured by Evil Bong, Eebee, but ultimately destroy her; the gang battles King Bong in the Amazon where Eebee is resurrected and helps them destroy the new threat; and the gang faces off against the alien Space Bong again with the help of Eebee. Larnell is dealing with two prospective buyers when Hambo the Clown (a shifty old clown with a pig nose) enters the shop. Larnell's assistant String, a gruff little person with a fake eye patch, deals with Hambo, who is looking to sell an Ooga Booga replica to the store for some fast cash. String refuses Ham I'd offer when two tourists, entirely depicted through racist Asian stereotypes, enter the store asking for directions. Hambo inexplicably poses them for a photo, takes the picture and promptly leaves with it, thanking them and apparently satisfied. String sells the tourists on some marijuana paraphernalia and the pair leaves, yelling obscenities at String who had earlier been verbally berating the tourists with racist Asian names and phrases after they began taking pictures of him and point out his dwarfism. Larnell is still selling the two patrons on some glassware by allowing them to test it with his own marijuana when the pair reveal they actually have no money. Larnell has String kick them out, who ominously returns with a bloody switch blade. While he is out Larnell goes to a back room and pulls Eebee (thought dead) out from a hidden safe.

Rabbit enters the shop, now a traveling salesman after renouncing the Priesthood due to the church's stance on marijuana and bearing Evil Bong merchandise. He tries to sell it to Larnell who instead is interested in the replica Gingerdead Man cookie that Rabbit is eating. He directs him to a newly opened bakery nearby called Dough Re Mi Bakery, operates by Sarah who looks suspiciously like Luann (a reference to the characters both being played by Robin Sydney). Larnell goes to buy a cookie and Rabbit waits for him to return in the back and finds Eebee. He smokes from her and is pulled into her Bong World.

Meanwhile, Sarah Leigh is working with her two employees at the bakery during this time and one of them asks about her newspaper article covering the bakery's opening. It also covers her history, which is when Larnell walks in and asks Sarah to visit his store so they can form a partnership promoting their two small business and she leaves. The Gingerdead Man kills both employees of the bakery while they have sex in the back. He then follows Sarah to Larnell's shop. When Larnell and Sarah arrive at the shop, Luann, the girlfriend of Larnell's former roommate and best friend Bachman, enters the shop asking about Brett. It is revealed that after defeating Space Bong, Brett and Bachman admitted their love for each other, moved to San Francisco and were married, to everyone's surprise. Luann insults Sarah and leaves angrily. Larnell enters the back room with Sarah expecting to find Rabbit and instead finds Eebee. The Gingerdead Man arrives and kills String by shoving a bong through his head. Larnell and Sarah escape him by entering the Bong World. Eebee convinces the Gingerdead Man she has the power to restore his human form if he smokes from her and enters the Bong World too so he follows Sarah and Larnell.

Gingerdead Man finds himself in a Bong World jungle and meets King Bong, who has been trapped inside the Bong World by Eebee since the events of Evil Bong 2. King Bong uses his Poontang Tribeswomen to send Gingey to the Pastry Tribunal, a court consisting of Cream Puff, Baguette, Tiny Tart, and Rasta Brownie where he is sentenced to eternal damnation: to be eaten and reformed repeatedly and forever. Meanwhile, Larnell and Sarah find Rabbit enjoying himself, having "mastered" the Bong World. He explains that the Bong World takes advantage and feeds off one's innermost desires, so escape they must think about not escaping. Gingey convinces the Tribunal to give him one chance at life as a cookie saying he will be good. Soon Larnell and Sarah are transported out of the Bong World to Eebee's surprise. She insists the Gingerdead Man will not be escaping who, in the Bong World, encounters Rabbit. When Gingey asks where Sarah is so he can finally kill her, Rabbit uses the Tribeswomen to neutralize him. The final scene shows the Gingerdead Man smoking a joint while sitting on a rock in the Bong World.

=== Evil Bong 420 (2015) ===
A couple years after the events of the previous film, Rabbit has escaped the Bong World, and has opened up a topless bowling alley, seemingly leaving the weed business for good, but is still selling weed, sneaking it inside bowling shoes. In the Bong World, Gingerdead Man plans his vengeance against Larnell and Sarah Leigh.

Meanwhile, Larnell has troubles when Velicity begins to suspect of the former cheating on her with Sarah Leigh, while this is happening, The Gingerdead Man plans to get his revenge on Sarah, Larnell and Rabbit. Despite the former's belief Rabbit has escaped the Bong World, Eebee is assured that he is still in it.

Eventually, Eebee and Gingerdead Man leave the Bong World to go after Rabbit and The Gang, Eebee confronts Rabbit for selling her weed to the Bowling Alley, but not before Rabbit restrains her with a bag over her head. The Latter begins neutralizing everyone in the Bowling Alley. During this, Gingerdead Man has sex with a stripper.

In the finale of the movie, Velicity and Sarah Leigh begin fighting for Larnell, but not before Rabbit neutralizes them. Rabbit comes up with the solution to Larnell's relationship with Velicity and Sarah, by bowling, and whoever wins, gets to have Larnell. Rabbit puts a stop to Gingerdead Man by neutralizing him with his Weedblower. Eebee escapes her restrain and teleports The Gang into the Bong World, setting up the next film.

=== Evil Bong High-5! (2016) ===
Shortly after 420, Larnell, Rabbit, Velicity, Sarah and the Gingerdead Man have all been sucked into the Bong World by Eebee, but Larnell and Rabbit manage to break a deal with Eebee to retrieve her a million dollars within 12 hours, otherwise Velicity and Sarah will remain in the Bong World for all eternity, The Gang return to Earth and get back to Larnell's shop.

Hambo from 420 comes back and tries selling a line of toys titled the "Badass Dolls" (this is a riff on Full Moon's true toy line known as the Badass Dolls). Throughout the movie, three of the badass dolls are revealed. Larnell's Dad returns and continues insulting him, and a group of rednecks and duo of stoners begin causing trouble at the shop.

Eventually, Hambo trades The Gang the million dollars they need to save Velicity and Sarah Leigh for the Evil Bong merchandise sold by Rabbit, Just in the nick of time, as Eebee receives the money, Larnell and Rabbit save Velicity and Sarah from the Bong World. Gingerdead Man's neutralization has worn off and threatens to murder everyone in the shop, but Rabbit uses his telekinesis to send Eebee and Gingerdead Man into his mind, but accidentally sends Larnell in too.

While inside Rabbit's mind, Larnell is put through an endless void of an acid trip, while Gingerdead Man and Eebee find a way out themselves. The ending teases Evil Bong 666.

=== Evil Bong 666 (2017) ===
Just a year after the events of High-5!, a woman named Lucy Furr has taken over the shop, and murders the two stoners from 420 and High-5! and sacrifices their souls in order to summon Eebee back to life. Eebee mentions how her plans of world domination were about to come into fruition but got foiled by Rabbit. The two strike a deal to work together for world domination.

Rabbit returns to the shop and reminisces of his times, working with and hanging out with Larnell, Meanwhile, Luann (or Sarah Leigh), now known as Faux Batty Boop, has been fired from Killjoy's Psycho Circus and starts working for the shop again. She runs into Velicity.

Eventually, Lucy's true intentions are revealed, and the latter drags Faux Batty Boop and Velicity to Sexy Hell and turns on Eebee. Leaving Rabbit and Eebee to teaming up, and create a creature known as The Gingerweed Man. Rabbit, Eebee and Gingerweed Man enter Sexy Hell, Gingerweed Man uses his weed launcher and defeats a bunch of demons, he and Gingerdead Man have a brief battle, before the latter is killed.

The Gang save Velicity and Faux Batty Boop and escape Sexy Hell, finally they destroy the portal to Sexy Hell, and celebrate by smoking joints. But down in Sexy Hell, Lucy Furr has sinister plans.

=== Evil Bong 777 (2018) ===
One Year Later, Rabbit, Velicity, Faux Batty Boop, Eebee and Gingerweed Man decide to close up shop and go on vacation to Las Vegas and enter a limo, rented by Rabbit.

The Gang rent a hotel, which is run by the ghosts of the stoner duo, Gingerweed Man and Faux Batty Boop start a relationship while Eebee tries getting Velicity into smoking. Downstairs Rabbit is drinking at a bar, however, in the third act of the film, The Gang find out that Lucy Furr had followed them to LA and split up.

Rabbit and Velicity hide in a horror movie museum, though Lucy catches on and nearly kills the two, but Eebee summons a portal, returning Lucy back to Sexy Hell. The film ends on a cliffhanger.

=== The Gingerweed Man (2021) ===
==== Chapter One: The Weed Man ====
A stoner finishes creating an alien weed creature named Buddy, but is soon pursued by a spy named Smokeahontas who was sent from a company named F. U.. Meanwhile, in the Unnamed City, Gingerweed Man (for short Ginggy) runs a weed delivery service. Ginggy delivers some gangster weed to a man named High, who is known to sell bizarre junk to the former. At High's, Ginggy finds the injured stoner from the beginning. After explaining his situation to Ginggy, he is given a fast-food bag containing Buddy inside, before dying, as the former leaves. Smokeahontas shoots High and demands information related to Buddy, after receiving info, the former takes High out of his misery. At the park, Ginggy discovers the Buddy alien as the former decides to take a smoke break. Once the Ginggy became the infamous mob boss "Martian Gingger Lord" he killed Al Packino and became friends with the monster that's under his bed. The newlyweds, Gingger and Al Packino's daughter, Packina, after visiting the Eustache Volcano, saw the legendary talking gun named Steven Universe and made him suck an evil monster sausage. Steven Universe, after sucking the big juicy monstrous milky sausage and comparing it to his sausage, he knew that he had some work to do, so he took off (his pants) and started dancing in the wind, it's midnight and his buns were soggy, and so were Packina's mail. The after credits showed the loving Packina killed by the super bong brothers, so Ginggy plans to take revenge.

==== Chapter Two: The Nub ====
Once he finishes his smoke break, Gingy takes Buddy back to his apartment, but Barbara gets increasingly annoyed of his antics, but eventually starts to like him. Smokeahontas arrives and kidnaps both Barbara and Buddy, Gingy discovers their disappearances and smokes from his bong. Suddenly, a fairy named Kaya The Weed God, she reveals that Buddy and Barbara have been taken to F. U. Headquarters and, Barbara is going to be sold for white slavery. While Buddy is going to be used by a man dressed in a reaper costume to turn into a weed god and take over the world. Gingy gets the help of Ooga Booga to hack into the F. U. HQ website to uncover information about where it is located, The two head off to rescue Buddy and Barbara. Meanwhile, Barbara is locked in a cage. The Reaper auctions off strippers to the local Mob, but when Gingy and Ooga Booga in disguise, auction for over a billion dollars for Barbara, The Reaper begins to suspect, but in time, Ooga Booga kills a couple of members of the Mob. Gingy holds off against Smokeahontas while Barbara saves Buddy and defeats the Reaper, Gingy kills Smokeahontas by farting massive weed gas in her face. With F. U. HQ defeated, and Ooga Booga finding ladies of his own, The Trio head back to their apartment. At home, Gingy and Barbara decide to raise Buddy as their own son, just like Rabbit did with Gingy.

=== Evil Bong 888: Infinity High (2022) ===
In Beverly Hills, California, confirming the location where the franchise takes place, Rabbit opens up a restaurant hoping to give up on marijuana altogether. A woman named Tom Atkins gets hired by Rabbit to run for the restaurant, He explains he got the money to open it up due to Larnell being sucked into his mind and leaving behind cash. He introduces her to the rest of the crew. Vanessa and Nicki, a lesbian couple who both have ADHD and mostly text each other on their phones. Sal, a German chef who prides himself in his nationality. And Eebee, who's still bent on taking over the world, helps cook food for the restaurant. As the clock ticks to the Grand Opening, Rabbit and the Gang struggle after finding out they are fresh out of ingredients, drama ensues to the point where Rabbit is close to pressing a red button and getting high.

Eebee and Sal decide to put aside their differences and start cooking with what they have got. Though in secrecy, Eebee puts weed in the ingredients Sal has, believing no one will care about what food they are eating when they are high. The first customers are a trio of women who grow horny from eating the weed-infected food. Next up are the Rednecks from 420 and High-5!, who each discuss getting into the cryptocurrency business.

Nicki serves two customers named Barbie and Kendra, the two discuss life after the COVID-19 pandemic. Afterwards, Joe Exotic meets the two and discusses his times helping lions and tigers. Meanwhile, a woman named Karen begins causing trouble and frustrates both Nicki and Rabbit, the latter is tempted to push the red button but realizes if he pushes it, that Eebee gets to take over the restaurant and backs off again. But when Karen comes back with the police, reporting women with suggestive clothes, Rabbit finally pushes the button and comes out with the Weedblower from 420, and gets high, finally ready for the police take him away. Suddenly, Rabbit summons Larnell back to life, shocked to see his return, Larnell simply smokes a joint. Though Rabbit prepares to suck everyone into his mind permanently, Eebee sucks everyone into the Bong World instead, giving up on taking over the world for good. The Gang remain perfectly content with staying in the Bong World for all of Eternity.

In the ending, The Gingerdead Man and The Gingerweed Man attend to the restaurant, confused about the restaurant being completely empty.

== Television special ==
On April 20, 2022, Full Moon released a documentary television special on their Amazon Prime channel and their streaming app titled Bad To The Bong: 16 Years of Eebee, celebrating sixteen years of the original Evil Bong film, highlighting the series' best moments, and including a trailer for Evil Bong 888: Infinity High.
