= Frightmare =

Frightmare may refer to:

- Frightmare (1974 film), a Pete Walker film
- Frightmare (1981 film), a horror film
- Frightmare (wrestler), a professional wrestler
- "Frightmare" (C.A.T.S. Eyes), a 1985 television episode
- "Frightmare" (Danny Phantom), a 2007 television episode
- Frightmare (video game), a 1988 video game by Cascade for C64, Spectrum and DOS
- Frightmare, a Mario Party 5 minigame
