= Giallo (2009 film) =

- Theatrical release poster
- Directed by: Dario Argento
- Written by: Jim Agnew; Sean Keller; Dario Argento
- Produced by: Adrien Brody; Rafael Primorac; Richard Rionda Del Castro
- Starring: Adrien Brody; Emmanuelle Seigner; Elsa Pataky
- Cinematography: Frederic Fasano
- Edited by: Roberto Silvi
- Music by: Marco Werba
- Production companies: Hannibal Media; Giallo Production; Footprint Investment Fund; Media Films
- Distributed by: Lionsgate
- Release dates: 25 June 2009 (Edinburgh International Film Festival); 1 July 2011 (Italy)
- Running time: 92 minutes
- Country: Italy
- Languages: English; Italian; Japanese
- Box office: $32,655

Giallo is a 2009 Italian thriller co-written and directed by Dario Argento and starring Adrien Brody, Emmanuelle Seigner and Elsa Pataky.

The film was poorly received at the time of its release, and is arguably most-known for Brody's lawsuit against the film for not having been paid.

== Plot ==
Turin, Italy: French flight attendant Linda and Italian-American detective Enzo Avolfi team up to find Linda's younger sister Celine. Celine, a model, has been abducted by a serial killer. Known only as "Yellow" ("Giallo" in Italian), he kidnaps beautiful foreign women in his unlicensed taxi cab. After drugging them, the killer proceeds to mutilate and finally murder them. He photographs his deeds so that the photos may grant him personal sexual gratification.

Enzo receives a phone call from a fellow officer, who finds the body of an Asian woman outside a church near a fountain. They find out she's still alive, and starts to speak in Japanese. Enzo and Linda start to look for a translator, who tells them that the girl was praying Buddha and then repeated "yellow." They visit the morgue, where Linda realizes that the killer's face could be yellow, and the coroner tells Enzo that yellow skin is a symptom of liver disease, so the killer might be on the waiting list for a new liver.

They go to the hospital and find Giallo, but he escapes. Enzo finds out his name is Flavio Volpe and gets his address. Giallo starts to torture Celine by cutting one of her fingers when she starts to bad-mouth him. Enzo breaks into Giallo's apartment but finds it empty and full of torture devices.

Enzo tells Linda why he became a policeman: long ago, Enzo, who was 10, witnessed his mother being murdered by a local butcher, to whom she owed money. Enzo kills the butcher in his own shop five years later, while Inspector Mori knows why he did it. Mori took him in as if he were his own son. Enzo had kept the knife he used to kill the butcher as a reminder of how he became a cop. Enzo also tells Linda that Giallo might be a pattern killer who hates beautiful women due to his deformity.

Throughout the film, Enzo and Linda find more victims and clues about who the killer is and why he tortures them. An origin story shows that Giallo's mother was a prostitute who gave her son up for adoption at a church, where orphaned kids started to bully him. Celine tries to escape from Giallo but gets captured. Just when he is about to strangle her, Celine tells him she's rich and will reward him with money.

Giallo breaks into Linda's apartment and demands a ransom for the safe return of Celine. The film ends with Enzo and Giallo having a shootout in a hotel. Giallo tries to escape but falls from a skylight to the lobby floor, dying instantly. The police searched his apartment for Celine but could not find her. They also try finding her at an abandoned gas factory where Giallo brings his victims.

Linda starts to blame Enzo for killing her sister, as well as calling him selfish and inhumane, because Giallo was going to tell her the location of where her sister is. Enzo tries to convince Linda that Giallo as a killer could not be trusted. After telling her this, he walks away while Linda continues to berate him. By chance, while patrolling a car park, a policeman hears Celine as she tries to gain attention, tied up and gagged in the trunk of Giallo's car.

== Cast ==
- Adrien Brody as Inspector Enzo Avolfi / Flavio Volpe / Giallo
- Emmanuelle Seigner as Linda
- Elsa Pataky as Celine
- Robert Miano as Inspector Mori
- Silvia Spross as Russian Victim
- Giuseppe Lo Console as Butcher
- Luis Molteni as Sal
- Lorenzo Pedrotti as Delivery Boy
- Daniela Fazzolari as Sophia
- Valentina Izumi as Keiko
- Taiyo Yamanouchi as Toshi
- Sato Oi as Midori
- Maryann McIver as Girl In Bookstore
- Barbara Mautino as Nurse
- Massimo Franceschi as Coroner
- Liam Riccardo as Baby Yellow
- Anna Varello as Butcher's Wife
- Giancarlo Judica Cordiglia as Desk Sergeant
- Nicolò Morselli as Young Enzo
- Farhad Re as Designer
- Patrick Oldani as Officer Gian Luca
- Andrea Redavid as Officer #1
- Linda Messerlinker as Girl Victim

== Production ==
"Giallo" is the Italian word for "yellow," and since the 1960s has also been a term used for a specific genre of crime fiction that used to be published in a series of books with trademark yellow covers.

In November 2007, Dario Argento signed on to direct Yellow, written by Jim Agnew and Sean Keller, a "satirical homage" to the giallo genre. By January 2008, now retitled to Giallo, Argento enlisted Ray Liotta, Vincent Gallo, and Asia Argento to star in the film. Filming was slated to begin in February 2008, in the Italian city of Turin, the same filming location for Argento's previous film, Mother of Tears. The following month, Gallo, Asia Argento's ex-fiancé, told New York Daily News that he was trying to exit the film due to the involvement of Asia Argento. By April 2008, Adrien Brody, Emmanuelle Seigner, and Elsa Pataky joined the cast, as Liotta, Asia Argento, and Gallo were no longer involved. Filming was then expected to begin on May 12, 2008. Brody took on not only Liotta's role, but Gallo's serial killer role as well, portraying the character under the pseudonym of "Byron Deidra".

Argento said in an interview that he dislikes the producers' cut of the film and that he no longer is attached to the project.

== Release ==
Giallo premiered at the 2009 Edinburgh International Film Festival in Edinburgh, Scotland. It premiered in America at the Omaha International Film Festival in Omaha, Nebraska on 14 March 2010. Claiming he was not paid the correct amount for his role in the film, Adrien Brody filed a lawsuit against the filmmakers, and attempted to prevent the film's release on DVD until he received his full salary. In late November 2010 Brody was granted a ruling in United States District Court that blocked the sale or use of Brody's likeness in Giallo until the actor's remaining salary was paid. On 20 January 2011, Deadline Hollywood Daily reported that Brody had reached a settlement with the producers. Brody stated, "I very much enjoyed the process of making Giallo and am happy that things have been resolved and that people can now enjoy seeing the film."

In January 2010, in an interview with Argento, the director claimed the film was supposedly blacklisted in America after failing to acquire distribution.

Giallo received a limited release in the United States on 11 June 2011, and was released in Italy on 1 July 2011 by Lionsgate.

== Critical reception ==
Giallo has received a negative reception from critics. Fangoria gave the film a 1/4 rating, writing, "this is a deeply disappointing work from a director who seems to be yellowing with age, his vision progressively jaundicing. After so many consecutive misfires, it might seem that Argento's creative career is coming to an end. With a film like Giallo, he only builds the gallows higher." Mark Kermode called it a "depressingly sleazy shocker" that "descends rapidly into self-pastiche, with even the director's trademark gliding camera moves and elegant architectural framings failing to raise the murky tone." Total Film wrote, "this Turin-based turkey has more in common with bargain-basement torture porn than the classy slashers that made Argento's name."
