= Dorothea (film) =

2025 crime horror film by Chad Ferrin

- Theatrical release poster
- Directed by: Chad Ferrin
- Written by: Chad Ferrin
- Starring: Susan priver; Pat McNeely; Lew Temple; Ezra Buzzington; Robert Steven Rhine
- Production company: Epic Pictures Group
- Release date: November 4, 2025 (limited theatre release)
- Running time: 90 minutes
- Country: United States
- Language: English

Dorothea is a 2025 true crime horror film written and directed by Chad Ferrin and starring Susan Priver, Pat McNeely, Lew Temple, Ginger Lynn, and Brinke Stevens, among other cast.

The plot follows the life of American serial killer Dorothea Puente, who murdered her elderly or vulnerable tenants at her boarding home in Sacramento, California, in the 1980s.

== Plot ==
The film begins at a California State Prison with an elderly and dying Dorothea Puente recounting her past to a younger cellmate named Queenie. Through flashbacks to the 1980s, Puente is played by actress Susan Priver, who is in the role of a younger Puente living on F Street in Sacramento, California, where she runs a boarding house. In the 1980s, Puente is a respected member of the local community in Sacramento, welcoming vulnerable people into her home, including elderly and mentally disabled residents.

However, beneath the facade of normality and the image of a gentle and sweet grandmother, Dorothea murders her tenants, taking advantage of their mental vulnerability to deceive and kill them, subsequently disposing of their bodies by burying them in her backyard garden. In order to have enough plots to bury the victims, Dorothea hires a local handyman named Billy 'Hurricane' Hodges to help her with the manual labor of the crimes while dealing with rat infestations and deep burial sites.

When social worker Judy Moise begins to suspect foul play at the F Street home, she informs detectives John Cabrera and Laurence Kaufman, who end up uncovering the horrors committed by the true Dorothea, a deceptive and psychopathic woman who killed defenseless people in cold blood to cash their Social Security disability checks.

== Cast ==
- Susan Priver as Dorothea Puente, a Sacramento serial killer
  - Pat McNeely as older Dorothea Puente
- Lew Temple as Billy 'Hurricane' Hodges, a handyman who aids Puente in the cover-up of her crimes
- Ezra Buzzington as Chief
- Robert Steven Rhine as Detective Laurence Kaufman
- Cyril O'Reilly as Detective John Cabrera
- Silvia Spross as Judy Mouse, a social worker
- Robert Miano as Everson Theodore Gillmouth, an elderly victim of Puente
- Brinke Stevens as Ruth Monroe, another victim of Puente
- Ginger Lynn as Betty Palmer
- William Salyers as Willy Wilkes
- Cassandra Gava as Charleston
- Elina Madison as Queenie
- Peter Mendoza as Roberto Puente, a former husband of Dorothea

== Reception ==
The film received mixed to favorable reviews. Celia Payne of Let's Talk Terror gave Dorothea a positive review, saying that the true horror in the film comes from knowing that what happened "to society's most vulnerable [was] done by one you'd least expect." Matthew Orozco of Macabre Daily agreed with Payne's review, saying that since Puente did not mutilate or commit sexual crimes seen in movies about other criminals, the horror came from her coldness when hurting vulnerable people who trusted her.

Graham Womack of The Sacramento Bee gave another generally favorable review, stating that Puente's story continues to echo in Sacramento, while providing information in the note about events in the real crimes committed by Puente and not completely told in the film. In an interview with PopHorror, writer and director Chad Ferrin concurred with those pointing to the seemingly inoffensive look in Puente regardless of committing premeditated serial murders, warning that one "must not judge a book by its cover."

Writing for Nerdly, George Thomas praised the 1980s settings of the films while criticizing the comedy style of some scenes whose inconsistency in tone stops them short from becoming part of a serious movie. Ryan Gajewski of The Hollywood Reporter highlighted Ferrin's works in developing true crime films, including other projects about serial killers Richard Ramirez and Ed Kemper.
