= Get Gone (film) =

- Directed by: Michael Thomas Daniel
- Written by: Michael Thomas Daniel
- Produced by: Michael Thomas Daniel; Mark David; DJ Dodd
- Starring: Lin Shaye; Weston Coppola Cage; Robert Miano; Bradley Stryker; Rico E. Anderson
- Cinematography: Mark David
- Edited by: Erich Demerath
- Music by: Patrick Wilson
- Production companies: Future Proof Films; Sweet Nelly Productions
- Distributed by: Cleopatra Entertainment
- Release dates: 31 July 2019 (Action on Film International Film Festival); 24 January 2020 (US)
- Running time: 91 minutes
- Country: United States
- Language: English

Get Gone is a 2019 American slasher film directed by Michael Thomas Daniel, starring Lin Shaye, Weston Coppola Cage, Robert Miano, Bradley Stryker and Rico E. Anderson.

== Cast ==
- Lin Shaye as Mama Maxwell
- Weston Coppola Cage as Patton Maxwell
- Robert Miano as Don Maxwell
- Bradley Stryker as Grant
- Rico E. Anderson as Ranger Rico
- Bailey Coppola as Apple Maxwell
- Cory Crouser as Kyle Hamm
- Adam Bitterman as Craig Eubanks
- Emily Shenaut as Abbey Rose
- Brittany Benita as Rene
- Caitlin Stryker as Connie
- Luke B. Carlson as Scott Whizzer
- Tristan David Luciotti as Tommy Bont
- Silvia Spross as Silvia Surveyor

== Release ==
The film received a limited release on 24 January 2020.

== Reception ==
Noel Murray of the Los Angeles Times wrote, "There’s nothing notably new — or especially scary — about any of it."

Frank Scheck of The Hollywood Reporter wrote, "Even the reliably good Shaye can't rescue this amateurish, overly derivative effort."

Setphanie Archer of Film Inquiry wrote, "While there are pieces of a truly successful horror film scattered throughout, they are drowned within a film lacking character depth, unnecessary exposition, poor technical execution and a continued male perspective of female treatment in horror films."
