= Norman Thaddeus Vane =

American film director (1928–2015)

- Born: July 7, 1928; Brookhaven, New York
- Died: May 2, 2015 (aged 86); Hollywood, California
- Other names: Norman T. Vane, Norman Thaddeus Vein
- Occupations: Film director, screenwriter, and producer

Norman Thaddeus Vane born Norman Thatteus Vein (July 7, 1928 – May 2, 2015) was an American screenwriter, producer, playwright and film director. He served as writer for the 1968 film Mrs. Brown, You've Got a Lovely Daughter, and in the subsequent year was writer and associate producer of the movie Lola. He wrote the screenplay for the 1972 film, 1931: Once Upon a Time in New York. Vane went on to direct the 1983 film, Frightmare, and continue contributing to writing films including The Black Room in 1984.

== Early life ==
Born Jewish, Vane converted to Roman Catholicism when he was 18. He spent one year in the United States Merchant Marine and two years in the US Air Force at Moody Air Force Base in Georgia. He attended Columbia University on the G.I. Bill.

== Career ==
Vane's first play, The Penguin, opened Off-Broadway in 1952 starring Martin Landau, to stellar reviews. His Broadway debut, Harbor Lights, ran for only four performances.

Vane spent most of the 1960s and early 1970s in London, where he wrote and directed his first two films, Conscience Bay and The Fledglings; ran two nightclubs, including Esmeralda's Barn, which was eventually sold to the British gangsters Ronnie and Reggie Kray; and was a regular contributor to Penthouse Magazine.

In the mid-1960s, he married Sarah Caldwell, then 16 years old, and later cast her in the 1968 film Mrs. Brown, You've Got a Lovely Daughter. He was writer and associate producer of the 1969 movie Lola, starring Charles Bronson which was based loosely on his marriage to Caldwell. (The two divorced by the late 1960s.)

He wrote the screenplay for the 1972 mafia film, 1931: Once Upon a Time in New York. In 1976, Vane wrote the screenplay and story for the film Shadow of the Hawk, starring Jan-Michael Vincent and Marilyn Hassett. He served as director and screenwriter of the 1983 film Frightmare, starring Ferdy Mayne. The film included satirical references to the 1931 film Dracula. Vane was writer and director of the 1984 film The Black Room, starring Cassandra Gaviola.

Vane wrote, directed and produced the film Club Life, which starred Tony Curtis, Dee Wallace, and Michael Parks. Vane's directing in Club Life received positive reception, with Lou Lumenick of The Record writing, "writer-director Norman Thaddeus Vane keeps a firm narrative grip on the proceedings, packing 14 musical numbers and three major fight sequences into its taut, 90-minute running time." Vane's work on the film received a more critical reception from Ernest Tucker in the Chicago Sun-Times, writing, "'Club Life' is like watching Dante's Inferno written on an Etch-a-Sketch. This vision comes from writer-director Norman Thaddeus Vane, whose 'Frightmare' film earned solid marks in the horror genre."

He was writer and director of the 1989 film Midnight; the film is also known by the title Midnight for Morticia. Vane produced the film with Gloria J. Morrison. It starred Tony Curtis, Rita Gam, Frank Gorshin, Wolfman Jack, Kathleen Kinmont, and Lynn Redgrave. According to Leonard Maltin's Movie Guide, following the video publication of the film a director's cut was featured in "theatrical showings".

Vane produced and directed the film Taxi Dancers, about a woman's adventures as a taxi dancer. The film was shown at the Cannes Film Festival. In a review of the film for Daily Variety, critic Leonard Klady wrote, "Writer/director/producer Norman Thaddeus Vane encourages a shrill acting style reminiscent of 1950s expose features."

He died on May 2, 2015, from heart failure at age 86.

== Filmography ==
=== Film ===
Year	Film	Role
1960	Conscience Bay	Writer, editor, producer, director
1968	Mrs. Brown, You've Got a Lovely Daughter	Writer
1970	Lola (aka London Affair aka Twinky)	Writer, associate producer
1972	1931: Once Upon a Time in New York	Writer
1976	Shadow of the Hawk	Writer
1979	Dracula Sucks	Second unit director
1983	Frightmare	Writer, director
1984	The Black Room	Writer
1986	Club Life	Writer, director, producer
1989	Midnight	Writer, director, producer
1993	Taxi Dancers	Writer, director, producer
2007	You're So Dead	Writer, director, producer

=== Television ===
Year	Title	Role	Notes
1957	Kraft Television Theatre	Writer	Ponds Theatre, Episode 1.92: "Collision"
1974	The Evil Touch	Writer	Episode 1.25: "They"

== See also ==
- Horror film
- List of comedy horror films
- List of horror films
- List of film and television directors
