= Club Life =

Club Life may refer to:

- Tiësto's Club Life, a weekly radio show by DJ Tiësto
- Club Life (1986 film), starring Tony Curtis
- Club Life (2015 film), starring Danny A. Abeckaser
