= Jailbirds (TV series) =

American reality television series

- Genre: Reality

Production
- Executive producer: J.C. Begley

Original release
- Network: Netflix
- Release: 2019

Jailbirds is an American reality television series about female inmates at the Sacramento County Jail, California, which premiered on Netflix in 2019. It documents the lives of female inmates of Sacramento County Jail in California, which has just under 2,400 inmates. The show aired a single season with six episodes in 2019, revealing to the audience various prisoners dealing with the reality of "their life being turned upside down" in jail as expressed by executive producer Rasha Drachkovitch when questioned on the prison environment. The production focused on aspects of prison life including violence, isolation and newfound relationships.

== Episodes ==
=== Episode One: "Dressed in Oranges" ===
The pilot episode introduces 19-year-old Yasmin Sundermeyer, the newest inmate processed into Sacramento County Jail on accusation of committing numerous felonies including alleged alcohol, drugs, weapon possession, carjacking and evading officers. Yasmin is then moved to a holding cell emotionally distraught with the realization of prison time as female prisoners yelling out 'new fish' and 'fresh meat' which is 'prison slang' to define the newest prisoner on the scene.

=== Episode Two: "Ima Be That Phatt B*tch" ===
In the second episode of the series, Sargent Hernandez commences the procedure of a lockdown following the verbal slander turned physical between two females who statistically are twenty percent more likely to become violent whilst imprisoned. The audience is showcased 'toilet talk' whereby prisoners including Daniel Carder and Katrina take advantage of the vertical piping network to communicate through their 'bowls' (toilets) as well as transfer notes in a practice called 'fishing' from which crafted rope is flushed between cells. The episode also introduces a new location within the prison known by inmates as 'Female AD-SEG' (administrative segregation) whereby prisoners are placed in single-inmate pods that are separated from the general population.

=== Episode Three: "We're All Criminals" ===
This episode presents some of the Deputies within the jail, revealing their background regarding why they desired to work in a prison environment. Deputy Turner became an officer of the law because she witnessed her cousin lose their life in a gang affiliated incident and wanted to protect the lives of others. On the other hand, Deputy Greenberg-Bobbitt went into law enforcement as her whole family work in this field and now she is documented as an experienced Deputy in Sacramento County Branch. The episode also delves into relationships in prison such as the alleged violent relationship between Megan 'monster' and Erin 'A1', gang affiliation and eruption of violence at the branch.

=== Episode Four: "Swimmin' in Sh*t, Bruh!" ===
The fourth episode begins with a flooding incident in one of the cells whereby men from an above block clogged the piping because of an argument that occurred whilst 'toilet talking.' The audience is also showcased the physical violence that can occur at any moment within the prison as Blanca was struck on the face in the yard which generated a large incident.

=== Episode Five: "It's a Crazy Beautiful Kinda Love" ===
The fifth episode in the series explores the nuances of being in a relationship within the restrictions of prison. In the beginning of the episode, two inmates from the branch and main jail Brianna Tibayan and Bianca are getting married requiring a prison style marriage whereby they are quickly wedded in a court room surrounded by family with Jay as an inmate witness and then returned to their respective cells. This unique relationship is described as long distance, however having the possibility of no physical contact following the wedding ceremony. The audience is also presented through the experiences of Jay the difficulties of trying to maintain a loving relationship with one partner being confined to a prison cell and the other living as a free man. She is struggling to detoxify from drugs, relying on the few visits from her partner Kadin and on the hope that he has remained loyal to her from the outside.

=== Episode Six: "She Swung at Me, I Swung Back" ===
The final episode in the series begins with a physical confrontation between Ebony and Noonie which sparks an all-out brawl with several female inmates being detained and separated. The show reveals the erratic nature of life behind bars whereby even the cameraman is caught in the middle of the violence. This violence results in a full investigation with several inner prison hearings, isolated inmates and additional days placed upon sentences. The audience including various online medias have developed speculations regarding the current whereabouts of these inmates seen on the show with no official statements from the production or the Sacramento County Jail. Finally, the series concludes with footage revealing some of the prisoners connecting with one another outside the prison after serving out the remainder of their sentence. Jailbirds filmed in Sacramento County Jail finished at the end of 2019 with seemly no further entries to the series. However, the show moved location, starting another series called Jailbirds New Orleans which aired in 2021.

== Cast ==
Courtney "Jay" Koranda as was an inmate on the show introduced in episode two, arrested for alleged evading and resisting arrest. She was documented on the show detoxing from drug addiction, a result of a psychological spiral following the recent passing of her mother to stage four cancer. She is also struggling with the reality of being in a relationship with Kadin whilst behind bars, counting down the days before they can live together again. Jay also reveals that she is also a mother of a four-year-old boy.

Tayler Renee Coatney was an inmate interviewed whereby she disclosed her involvement in a home invasion burglary which resulted in a father and his two sons being murdered.

Rebecca Temme nicknamed 'Baby Girl' came onto the show as an administratively segregated inmate. The show describes her victimization at a young age with her mother resorting to drug use which placed Rebecca in foster care whereby, she turned violent, began using drugs at the age of ten and placed in jail under suspected murder and robbery charges. The documentary places her as a representation of the number incarcerated women who report high rates of childhood victimization.

Megan Hawkins nicknamed 'Monster' is an inmate interviewed in episode three, revealing her origins as an East Coast tattoo artist who turned to a life of crime. Whilst transferring to the Sacramento County Branch, she revealed to the cameras that she was facing sentences for 'check fraud, grand theft auto, transporting narcotics, possession of a controlled substance and committing a felony during bail.

Ebony was announced to viewers in episode three when involved in several physical and verbal incidences both inside and outside of prison. She was placed into Sacramento County Jail on charges involving burglary, robbery, assault, identity fraud, driving without a license, evading the police and shoplifting. Although placed under these charges, Ebony dreams of one day becoming a business owner, inspired by her mother who was the owner of a nail salon in Oakland.

David Matlock who is known as 'Squeeze' for his use of guns is introduced to the audience in episode five as a twenty-four-year-old male prisoner who is charged with theft and unlawful driving of a vehicle with no bail. The show explores his start into a lifestyle of crime for the ages of fourteen given his lack of a father figure and exposure from his mother who couldn't pay the rent and resorted to hard drug use. He is shown 'toilet talking' to a female inmate called Noonie who is falling for him; however, David is constantly questioning the thought of being in a long-term relationship whilst in prison.

== Production ==
=== Location ===
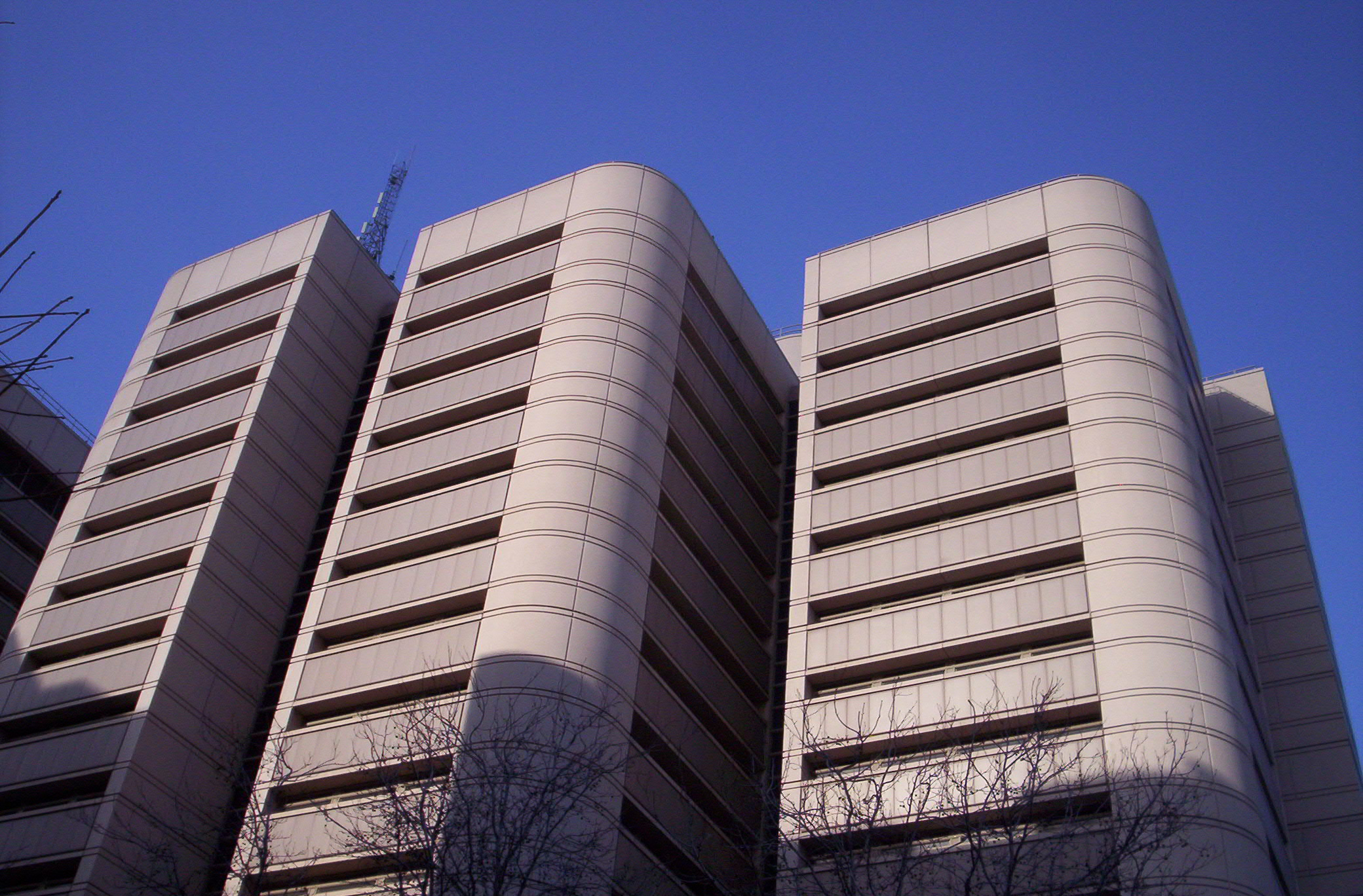
The series is filmed at the Sacramento County Jail (pictured in 2008).

The show being filmed on location inside Sacramento County Jail in California requires a production crew that documents logistically and ethically under the extreme conditions that is the prison environment. This Jailbirds production crew were able to convince the heads of faculty to enable filming on the premises whereby 99% of correctional facilities would deny the opportunity to produce a documentary.

=== Filming ===
In crafting the story lines within the reality show, executive producer Rasha Drachkovitch discussed the requirement to find inmates who are comfortable behind the camera, will sign a personal release enabling the publication of the footage and give a story that reflects on an aspect of the 'jail experience.' The method carried out in finding individuals that offered talent and an eye-opening story involved constantly filming and communicating with the prisoners until the best candidate was found. This was explained by the president of 44 Blue Productions in that 'someone from the team was usually in prison everyday film' looking for the few people who are willing to share their story. The team revealed that the required bond with inmates took months to generate whereby the crew developed strong relationships with the prisoners build on trust and approval, enabling the documentation of various prison origins and experiences.

== Jargon ==
Throughout the series, Jailbirds showcases communication between inmates which incorporates distinctive prison lingo or jargon that is constantly developing. The show also explores the context and deeper meaning of these words through one-on-one interview with the female inmates. The confines of the prison create a unique community that develops their own language which is understood by all prisoners regardless of their cultural background.

Green light is word used on various occasions involving the discussion of violence whereby the common phrase 'you have the green light,' specifically means an inmate is approving the incitement of violence towards another prisoner. The nature of this language is to all the discussion of future violence without prison staff being aware. This is presented within the show in episode five 'She Swung at Me, I Swung Back' where a male inmate nicknamed 'Squeeze' encourages Noonie to physically attack Ebony repeating 'green light Noonie green light,' which say her get into a heated brawl with Ebony that sent the prison into lockdown.

Toilet talk or the bowl is a term specific to Sacramento County Jail which describes a practice involving inmates communicating to each other on different levels of the prison through pipes of the toilet. The vertical piping not only enables inmates to talk through their toilets to other levels but also send contraband or other items as well. This is achieved through a process called fishing where inmates create two long ropes using items such as T-shirts with cutlery tied on each end. Then they are placed in the toilet and flushed, enabling both lines to connect and transport weapons or even drugs.

'Fish' is a common term used to describe any new inmate in the prison. The jargon is not exclusive to the Sacramento County Jail in California with the slang dating back to the 1950s. The connotation is linked to the significant attention drawn to the new inmate placed into the cell just as significant attention would be given to a smelly fish.

== See also ==
- List of original programs distributed by Netflix
