= Silvia Spross =

- Born: Dielsdorf, Zurich, Switzerland
- Other name: Lapzo
- Occupation: Actress
- Known for: Giallo

Silvia Spross (born in Dielsdorf, Zurich) is a Swiss-born American film, television, and stage actress. Originally from Gais Appenzell.

== Biography ==
Silvia Spross began her career as a street performer in Central Park, doing shows with a tap dancing puppet named Bonifaz. She attended Uta Hagen's HB Studio in Manhattan full-time for three years. Since then, Miss Spross has appeared in numerous independent films, working with actors such as Adrien Brody, Danny Glover, Martin Landau, Michael Rooker, Christopher Masterson and the renowned Italian director Dario Argento. Miss Spross has also been featured in a number of theatrical productions, including the Off-Broadway show "St Nicholas At Christmas Tide."

Miss Spross currently lives in Los Angeles where she works with her mentor Robert Miano. Swiss German. In 2009, she launched a jewelry store in Santa Monica.

== Filmography ==
Year	Title	Role	Notes
2025	Dorothea	Judy Mouse	Biopic about serial killer Dorothea Puente.
2020	Exorcism at 60,000 Feet	Sally	
2020	The Deep Ones	Ingrid Krauer	
2011	Mysteria	Roommate	
2011	Eamon's Road	Martha Raymond	
2009	Giallo	Russian Victim	
2009	Exact Bus Fare	Dirty Donna	
2009	Someone's Knocking at the Door	Annie	
2008	David & Fatima	Nurse Levi	
2008	The Art of Travel	Vopka	
2007	Lady Samurai	FBI Assistant	
2007	Satisfy Me	Toni	
2006	Vagabond	Kayla	
2006	The System Within	Spa Girl	
2005	All Babes Want to Kill Me	Marina #5 / Set Director	
