= Exorcism at 60,000 Feet =

2019 comedy horror film

- Film poster
- Directed by: Chad Ferrin
- Written by: Robert Rhine; Daniel Benton
- Produced by: Robert Rhine
- Starring: Robert Miano; Bai Ling; Bill Moseley; Lance Henriksen; Kevin J. O'Connor; Robert Rhine; Kelli Maroney; Silvia Spross; Johnny Williams; Matthew Moy; Adrienne Barbeau
- Cinematography: Christian Janss
- Edited by: Chad Ferrin
- Music by: Richard Band
- Production companies: Girls and Corpses
- Distributed by: Girls and Corpses; Shout! Studios
- Release date: August 9, 2019 (Hollywood Horrorfest)
- Running time: 95 minutes
- Country: United States
- Language: English

Exorcism at 60,000 Feet is a 2019 comedy horror film that was directed by Chad Ferrin, based on a script written by Robert Rhine and Daniel Benton. Rhine also served as one of the film's producers and as one of the actors.

== Synopsis ==
The movie begins with a Christian priest, Father Romero, exorcising a demon from two men, Lt. Garvan and Martin, by shooting Garvan in the head and killing him. Romero then boards a flight to Vietnam along with several other passengers. Garvan's remains are also on the plane. During the flight his body reanimates, allowing the demon to possess two of the passengers. Romero manages to successfully exorcise the passengers.

Romero tells a Rabbi, named Feldman, that he had served with Garvan during the Vietnam War. The lieutenant had put him in a coma for several years, due to Garvan having a mental breakdown and shooting both Romero and a little girl he was trying to exorcise. The demon possesses several others, one of which results in a possessed pregnant woman giving birth to a demon baby that gets flushed down the toilet. Together, the priest and rabbi go to the cargo hold to battle Garvan, who manages to escape by overwhelming Romero with visions.

During the chaos, Romero discovers that one of the passengers, Amanda, is the sister to the little girl Garvan murdered. He successfully persuades her to assist him and together they convince one of the pilots to fly the plane to 60,000 feet (18,288 meters), as this will take them further from Hell and the source of the demon's powers. More deaths and possessions occur, but ultimately Romero, Feldman, Amanda and several other survivors land the plane, only to be met by Garvan's corpse and several other undead, possessed people.

== Cast ==
- Robert Miano as Father Romero
- Bai Ling as Amanda
- Lance Henriksen as Captain Houdee
- Matthew Moy as Thang
- Kevin J. O'Connor as Buzz
- Bill Moseley as Garvan
- Adrienne Barbeau as Mrs. Montegue
- Robert Rhine as Rabbi Larry Feldman
- Silvia Spross as Sally
- Kelli Maroney as Ms. Jenkins
- Kyle Jones as Brad
- Johnny Williams as Frankie Foldem
- Jin N. Tonic as Veronica
- Stefanie Peti as Debbie
- Gino Salvano as Abudabu

== Release ==
Exorcism at 60,000 Feet premiered on August 9, 2019 at Hollywood Horrorfest, followed by a Blu-ray, DVD, and VOD release on May 5 of the same year through Shout! Studios' Scream Factory label.

== Reception ==
Much of the criticism for Exorcism at 60,000 Feet centered upon the film's humor, which Dread Central described as "tired gags and stereotypes". Elements of praise focused on the Richard Band soundtrack and Kim Newman stated that it was "almost superfluously excellent". HorrorNews.net gave a favorable review for the film, stating that it was "that film that cheerfully plays with its audience. A bucket of blood here, some pea green puke, nuns who engage in lesbian sex, as well as ample amounts of other outrageous humor, and a game cast of artists who are in all-too-familiar surroundings and loving it."

=== Awards ===
- Best Horror Comedy Feature at Hollywood Horrorfest (2019, won - Robert Rhine)
- Best Actor at Hollywood Horrorfest (2019, won - Robert Miano)
- Best Comedy Actress at Hollywood Horrorfest (2019, won - Bai Ling)
- Best Original Score at Hollywood Horrorfest (2019, won - Richard Band)
