= Elly Kenner =

Israeli film editor, director, and producer (born 1948)

- אלי קנר
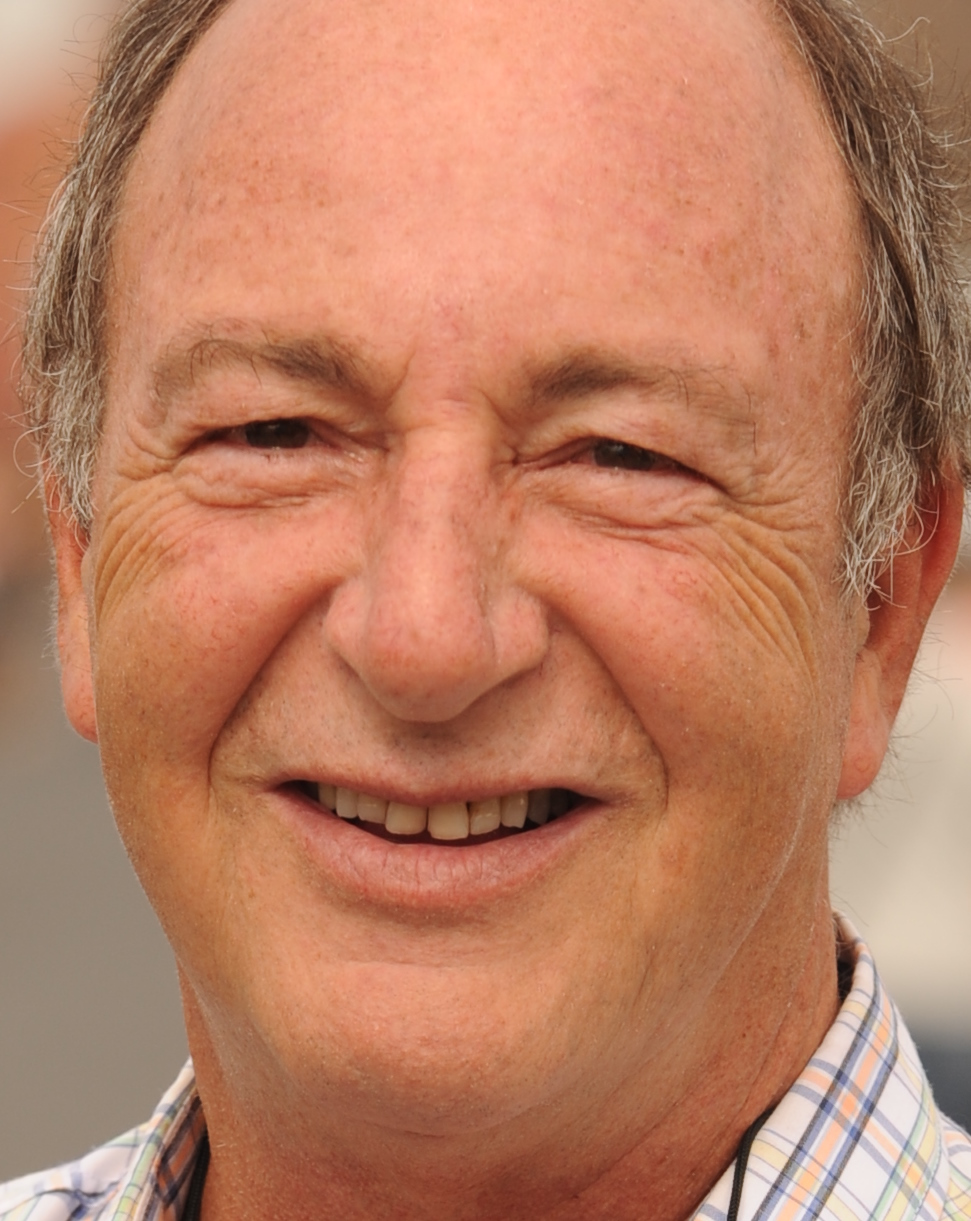
- Born: October 7, 1948 (age 77); Jerusalem
- Citizenship: Film
- Education: Master's degree
- Alma mater: Boston University, United States
- Occupations: Film producer, director
- Years active: 1970s-

Elly Kenner (Hebrew: אלי קנר; born October 7, 1948) is an Israeli film editor, director, and producer.

== Early life ==
Born in Jerusalem, Kenner attended Gymnasia Rehavia. He studied psychology and theater at The Hebrew University of Jerusalem. In 1972, Kenner enrolled at Boston University in the United States, where earned for a Master's Degree in Film.

== United States career ==
In 1976, his film Falling received positive reviews in The Boston Globe and The Los Angeles Times. It won a Cinematography award from the American Society of Cinematographers.

In 1976 Kenner moved to Hollywood where he edited films for the American Film Institute's Directing Workshop for Women.

His second feature film, The Black Room was released in the United Kingdom in 1983.

== Return to Israel ==
Kenner returned to Jerusalem in 1984. After returning to Israel, he became director of Hello Jerusalem, a series screening in the United States.

In 1989, he made an episode of the Israel television news program Mabat Sheni, "No Free Enterprise." The program received positive reviews from Heda Boshes of Haarets Newspaper and Sima Kadmon of Maariv Newspaper.

Later, Kenner became partner in the Jerusalem advertising agency "Sheta", and produced Visions of the Holy Land.

== Mystical period ==
The 6-part film series Esoterica Jerusalem deals with Healing and Channeling. One of the chapters of this series was screened in January 1992 at the Film Festival at Tours in France. In the newspaper BaMachane Eitan Bar Yoseff called Kenner "Atlantis's Ambassador to Israel."

In 1992, Kenner produced The Sixth Dimension, a weekly program dealing with mysticism and alternative medicine, on Israel's then temporary Channel 2.

== Later career ==
In 1994, Kenner directed a short dramatic film for the "Israel Film Service" about the new peace accord agreement with Jordan, starring Dubi Gal and Oded Menashe. The film was screened in schools around the country by the Ministry of Education.

1995, Kenner produced and directed feature film Mi Ha'Abba? (Who is the Father?) starring Dubi Gal, Nitza Shaul, Uri Banai and Maria Ovanov. The film was invited to screen at the International Film Festival in Shanghai in 1997.

== Television ==
1988-2011, Kenner was a news editor for the Jerusalem Bureau of the National French television station France 2.
