= Gina La Piana =

American actress (born 1978)

- Born: 1978 (age 47–48); Brooklyn, New York, U.S.
- Occupations: Actress, singer

Gina La Piana (born 1978 in Brooklyn, New York) is an American actress and pop singer.

== Filmography ==
=== Film ===
Year	Film	Role	Notes
1996	Diamonds in the Rough	Maria	
1996	Jerry Maguire	Former girlfriend	uncredited
1997	Fix	Hot girl "Carla"	
1998	Nash Bridges	Rosaria	
2000	Pitstop	Rita	
2000	Knockout	Sandra Lopez	
2002	Cinderella II: Dreams Come True	Bibidi bobbidy boo	
2002	Ali G Indahouse	Hoochie	
2002	Buddha Heads	Nurse Cassandra	
2005	Crash Landing	Cindy	
2009	30 Days to Die	Sophia	
2010	Black Widow	Gloria	
2014	Audrey	Stacy	Executive producer
2014	Baby Geniuses and the Treasures of Egypt	Cleopatra	
2015	Baby Guniuses and the Space Baby	Nina	
2019	Frank, Earnest with Mercy	Mercy	Short film
2019	Stay with Me	Georgia	Executive producer
2020	The Deep Ones	Alex	Producer

=== Television ===
Year	Show	Role	Notes
1994	Boogies Diner	Juliana	
1997	Beverly Hills, 90210	Vee Jay	Episode: 'Spring Breakdown'
1998	Nash Bridges	Rosaria	Episode: 'Hardball'
2003	Days of Our Lives	Gabriella 'Gabby' Ortiz	12 episodes
2002	Meet the Marks	Hot friend	
2007	Studio 60 on the Sunset Strip	Diana Valdes	
2007	Criminal Minds	Sammy	Episode: 'Now Way Out, Part II'
2008	Everybody Hates Chris	Arminta	Episode: 'Everybody Hates Docs'
2010	The Mentalist	Hannah Diaz	Episode: 'Red Herring'
2010	Bones	Josephine	Episode: 'The Maggots in the Meathead'
2013	Anger Management	Blake	Episode: 'Charlie and the Sex Addict'
2016-2017	Sangre Negra	Rosa Bianchi	2 episodes
2017	BloodLands	Det. Maria Trevino	Episode: 'Pilot'
2019	American Soul	Sarah Jacobs	Episode: 'Man is First Destiny'

== Discography ==
- Giana La Piana (2007) note: online only album
