= Elsa Pataky =

Spanish model and actress (born 1976)

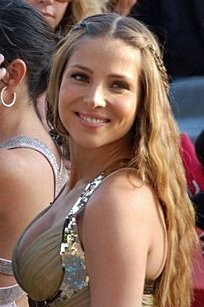
- Pataky in 2007
- Born: Elsa Lafuente Medianu; 18 July 1976 (age 50); Madrid, Spain
- Education: Universidad CEU San Pablo
- Occupations: Model; actress
- Years active: 1997–present
- Spouse: Chris Hemsworth (m. 2010)
- Children: 3, including India Rose Hemsworth

Elsa Lafuente Medianu (Spanish: [ˈelsa laˈfwente meˈðjanu]; born 18 July 1976), known professionally as Elsa Pataky, is a Spanish-Romanian model and actress. Pataky is known for her leading role of Raquel Alonso in the Spanish teen drama Al salir de Clase (1997–2002), before garnering international recognition as Elena Neves in the Fast & Furious franchise. She has appeared in the films Snakes on a Plane (2006), Giallo (2009) and Give 'Em Hell, Malone (2009). She also starred in the Spanish film Di Di Hollywood (2010) and played Mr. Norton and the Vuvalini General in Furiosa: A Mad Max Saga (2024) in a dual role.

== Early life ==
Pataky was born Elsa Lafuente Medianu in Madrid, Spain, the daughter of José Francisco Lafuente, a Spanish biochemist, and Cristina Medianu Pataky, a Romanian publicist. Her grandmother Rosa was Hungarian from the Transylvania region of Romania.

Pataky attended the Universidad CEU San Pablo, studying journalism and taking acting classes. In addition to Spanish and Romanian, she is fluent in English, Italian, Portuguese, and French.

== Career ==
Pataky was a member of the Madrid theatre company Teatro Cámara de Ángel Gutiérrez. Eventually, she left school when she was cast in the television series Al salir de clase. Some of her subsequent films were co-productions with the UK and France, which introduced her to working in English and French. She was in the cast of the television series Queen of Swords (2000) as Señora Vera Hidalgo, trophy wife of Gaspar Hidalgo and mistress of Captain Grisham, credited in the opening titles but appearing in only 14 of the 22 episodes. She also had a recurring role in the television series Los Serrano, playing teacher Raquel, who fell in love with her student Marcos (Fran Perea).

Pataky has appeared in over 10 Spanish films and co-starred in the French film Iznogoud (2004). She was also on the cover of August 2006 issue of Maxim. She was cast in 2009 in the Mexican series Mujeres Asesinas as Paula Moncada in the episode "Ana y Paula, Ultrajadas". She also starred in the action noir film Give 'Em Hell, Malone and Dario Argento's Giallo.

Pataky became the female face for the first collection of Time Force's jewelry line Ultimate Jewel, opposite football star Cristiano Ronaldo. She played Officer Elena Neves in the movie Fast Five, with Dwayne Johnson as her partner, Luke Hobbs. MTV Networks' NextMovie.com named her one of the Breakout Stars to Watch for in 2011. Pataky was a stand in for Natalie Portman in the post end credit scene in Thor: The Dark World.

Pataky reprised her role as Elena Neves in Fast & Furious 6 (2013), Furious 7 (2015), and The Fate of the Furious (2017), the sixth, seventh and eighth installments of Fast & Furious film series respectively.

In 2018, Pataky starred in the Australian web television series Tidelands as Adrielle Cuthbert. It was released on 14 December 2018 on Netflix.

Pataky played the lead role in Interceptor, directed by Matthew Reilly, which was released in June 2022.

Pataky co-founded a skincare brand called Purely Byron. The brand launched its first product in 2022. In March 2023, Purely Byron was placed in administration and put up for sale. At the time, BWX Group owned a 47.4 per cent stake in the company, while Ido Leffler and Lance Kalish held about 22 per cent each, and Chris Hemsworth's Byron Bay 1st Management owned a 3.2 per cent stake.

== Personal life ==
Pataky dated French actor Michaël Youn from 2004–06 and American actor Adrien Brody from 2006–09. She started dating Australian actor Chris Hemsworth in early 2010 after meeting through their mutual representatives. Pataky and Hemsworth married during the Christmas holidays in 2010. They have three children together: a daughter, India Rose Hemsworth, and twin sons. In 2015, the family moved from Los Angeles to Byron Bay, Australia.

In September 2012, Pataky won €310,000 in a ruling by the Supreme Court of Spain against publishing group Ediciones Zeta, owner of the magazine Interviú which in March 2007 published topless photos of Pataky that had been taken with a long lens while she was changing clothes during a photoshoot for Elle magazine.

== Filmography ==
=== Film ===
Year	Title	Role	Notes	Ref.
1997	Solo en la buhardilla	Chica revista	Short film	
2000	The Art of Dying	Candela		
2000	Tatawo	Blanqui		
2000	Less is More	Diana		
2001	Don't Tempt Me	Waitress in Hell		
2001	Twelfth Night	Marta Cuspineda		
2002	Peor imposible ¿qué puede fallar?	Fátima		
2003	Beyond Re-Animator	Laura Olney		
2003	El furgón	Nina		
2003	Atraco a las 3... y media	Katya		
2004	Romasanta	Barbara		
2004	Tiovivo c. 1950	Balbina		
2005	Iznogoud	Prehti-Ouhman		
2005	Arquitectura efímera deconstruida	Vídeo 'Retorciendo palabras'	Direct-to-video	
2005	Ninette	Alajandra 'Ninette'		
2006	Snakes on a Plane	Maria		
2007	Manual of Love 2	Cecilia		
2008	Máncora	Ximena Saavedra		
2008	Skate or Die	Dany		
2008	Santos	Laura Luna		
2009	Giallo	Celine		
2009	Give 'Em Hell, Malone	Evelyn		
2009	Shorts	Allie Hamilton	Voice; Spanish dub	
2010	Mr. Nice	Ilza Kadegis		
2010	Di Di Hollywood	Di Di		
2011	La importancia de llamarse Enesto		Short film	
2011	Fast Five	Elena Neves		
2011	Where the Road Meets the Sun	Michelle		
2011	Snowflake, the White Gorilla	Bruja del Norte / Brumhilda the Witch	Voice	
2013	All Things to All Men	Sophia Peters		
2013	The Wine of Summer	Veronica	Also producer	
2013	Fast & Furious 6	Elena Neves		
2015	Furious 7	Elena Neves		
2017	The Fate of the Furious	Elena Neves		
2018	12 Strong	Jean Nelson		
2022	Interceptor	JJ Collins		
2022	Thor: Love and Thunder	Wolf Woman		
2022	Poker Face	Penelope		
2022	Carmen	Gabrielle		
2023	Fast X	Elena Neves	Archive footage from Fast Five	
2024	Furiosa: A Mad Max Saga	Mr. Norton / Vuvalini General	Dual role	

=== Television ===
Year	Title	Role	Notes	Ref.
1997	Al salir de clase	Raquel Alonso	192 episodes	
1998	Tio Willy		1 episode	
1998	La vida en el aire		13 episodes	
2000	Hospital Central	Maribel	2 episodes	
2000	Queen of Swords	Vera Hidalgo	14 episodes	
2002	Clara		Television film	
2002	Paraíso	Luisa	Episode: "El cebo"	
2003	7 vidas	Cristina	Episode: "La jaula de las locas"	
2003	Los Serrano	Raquel Albaladejo	11 episodes	
2005	Films to Keep You Awake: The Christmas Tale	Ekran	Television film	
2009	Mujeres asesinas	Paula Moncada	Episode: "Ana y Paula, ultrajadas"	
2018	Tidelands	Adrielle Cuthbert	Main role	
2026	The Tribute	Stella Novak	Main role	

=== Music videos ===
Year	Artist	Song	Ref.
2004	Fangoria	"Retorciendo Palabras"	
