= The Deep Ones =

2020 film directed by Chad Ferrin

- Official release poster
- Directed by: Chad Ferrin
- Written by: Chad Ferrin; H. P. Lovecraft
- Story by: H. P. Lovecraft
- Based on: The Shadow over Innsmouth by H. P. Lovecraft
- Produced by: Chad Ferrin; Gina La Piana; Robert Miano; Jeff Olan
- Starring: Gina La Piana; Robert Miano; Johann Urb; Silvia Spross; Jackie Debatin; Nicolas Coster
- Cinematography: Jeff Billings
- Edited by: Jahad Ferif
- Music by: Richard Band
- Production companies: Crappy World Films; Laurelwood Films
- Distributed by: 123 Go Films; ILY Films
- Release dates: October 8, 2020 (Sitges); April 23, 2021 (United States)
- Running time: 83 minutes
- Country: United States
- Languages: English; Finnish; Swiss German
- Box office: $19,629

The Deep Ones (also known as H.P. Lovecraft's the Deep Ones or H.P. Lovecraft was a Deep One) is a 2020 American horror science fiction film written and directed by Chad Ferrin and based on H.P. Lovecraft's 1931 novel The Shadow over Innsmouth. The film stars Gina La Piana, Robert Miano, Johann Urb, Silvia Spross, Jackie Debatin, Nicolas Coster and was produced by Chad Ferrin, Gina La Piana, Robert Miano and Jeff Olan. It was premiered at Sitges Film Festival on October 10, 2020. The film is about a couple recovering from a recent miscarriage that encounters overly friendly locals and strange goings-on at a coastal getaway.

The Deep Ones is the last film appearance of Nicolas Coster after he died on June 26, 2023.

== Plot ==
After suffering a miscarriage, American couple Alex and Petri seek solace by renting a secluded beachfront Airbnb in the coastal town of Oxnard, California. Their hosts, the affable yet unsettling Russell Marsh and his visibly pregnant wife Ingrid, welcome them with open arms. However, the couple's seemingly idyllic retreat quickly devolves into a nightmare as they encounter a community steeped in bizarre rituals and ancient sea worship.

Russell and Ingrid introduce Alex and Petri to the local residents, who exhibit peculiar behaviors and an uncanny familiarity. Petri becomes increasingly distant, exhibiting signs of hypnosis and enthrallment, particularly after a boat outing with Russell. Alex, meanwhile, experiences disturbing visions and encounters, including a visit from a peculiar doctor, Gene Rayburn, who insists on conducting invasive health checks.

The couple is invited to a neighborhood gathering, which reveals the community's true nature, a cult devoted to the ancient sea deity Dagon. The cult's objective is to use Alex as a vessel for Dagon's offspring, continuing a lineage of human-deep one hybrids.

As Alex delves deeper into the town's secrets, she discovers that Ingrid's pregnancy is far from ordinary, marked by grotesque tentacle manifestations. The cult's rituals involve drugging and hypnotizing victims, leading to scenes of sexual violence and forced impregnation by sea creatures. One particularly disturbing sequence involves a woman being torn apart during a monstrous birth.

Alex attempts to escape the cult's clutches, battling both the brainwashed Petri and the monstrous entities summoned by the cult.

== Cast ==
- Gina La Piana as Alex
- Robert Miano as Russel Marsh
- Johann Urb as Petri
- Silvia Spross as Ingrid Krauer
- Jackie Debatin as Deb
- Nicolas Coster as Finley
- Kelli Maroney as Ambrose Zadok
- Timothy Muskatell as Dr. Gene Rayburn

== Release ==
The film was premiered at Arizona Underground Film Festival on September 19, 2020, HARDLINE Film Festival on September 24, 2020, Santiago Horror Film Festival on September 30, 2020, H. P. Lovecraft Film Festival on October 2, 2020, Grimmfest International Festival of Fantastic Film and AFI Silver on October 9, 2020, Sitges Film Festival on October 10, 2020 and Irish Film Institute Horrorthon on October 24, 2020.

It also premiered at The Dark Hedges Film Festival on October 26, 2020, Anatomy Crime & Horror International Film Festival on October 29, 2020, Another Hole in the Head Film Festival on December 11, 2020, MidWest WeirdFest on March 5, 2021, UK Motion Picture Festival on March 11, 2021.

The film has a limited release in the United States on April 23, 2021.

== Reception ==
Alix Turner of Ready Steady Cut rated the film 1.5 out of 5 rating and wrote: "Awful film that likes to think it's a modern, glamorous Lovecraft adaptation, but just looks cheap and sleazy". Mike McGranaghan of The Aisle Seat gave the film a rating of 1/4 and said: "Writer/director Chad Ferrin doesn't build any mystery or suspense with the story. If you're going to adapt Lovecraft, shouldn't focusing on those things be your primary order of business?"

Roger Moore of Movie Nation rate the film 1.5 out of 4 rating and he wrote: "If only the unintentional laughs, and the intentional ones, added up to something more than a vaguely canonical Lovecraft spoof." On Culture Crypt the film has a review score of 45 out of 100 indicating "unfavorable reviews".

Emilie Black of Cinema Craze gave the film a 3.5/5 rating and wrote:

The Deep Ones is a low budget take on Lovecraft's work that modernizes the subject at hand and makes the most of it.

== Accolades ==
| Award ceremony | Category | Recipient | Result | Ref. |
|---|---|---|---|---|
| Anatomy Crime and Horror Film Festival | Best Picture | The Deep Ones | Won | |
| Anatomy Crime and Horror Film Festival | Best Director | Chad Ferrin | Won | |
| Anatomy Crime and Horror Film Festival | Best Cinematography | Jeff Billings | Won | |
| Anatomy Crime and Horror Film Festival | Best Special Effects | The Deep Ones | Won | |
| Anatomy Crime and Horror Film Festival | People's Choice Best Actor | Robert Miano, Johann Urb | Won | |
