= Rico E. Anderson =

American film and television actor

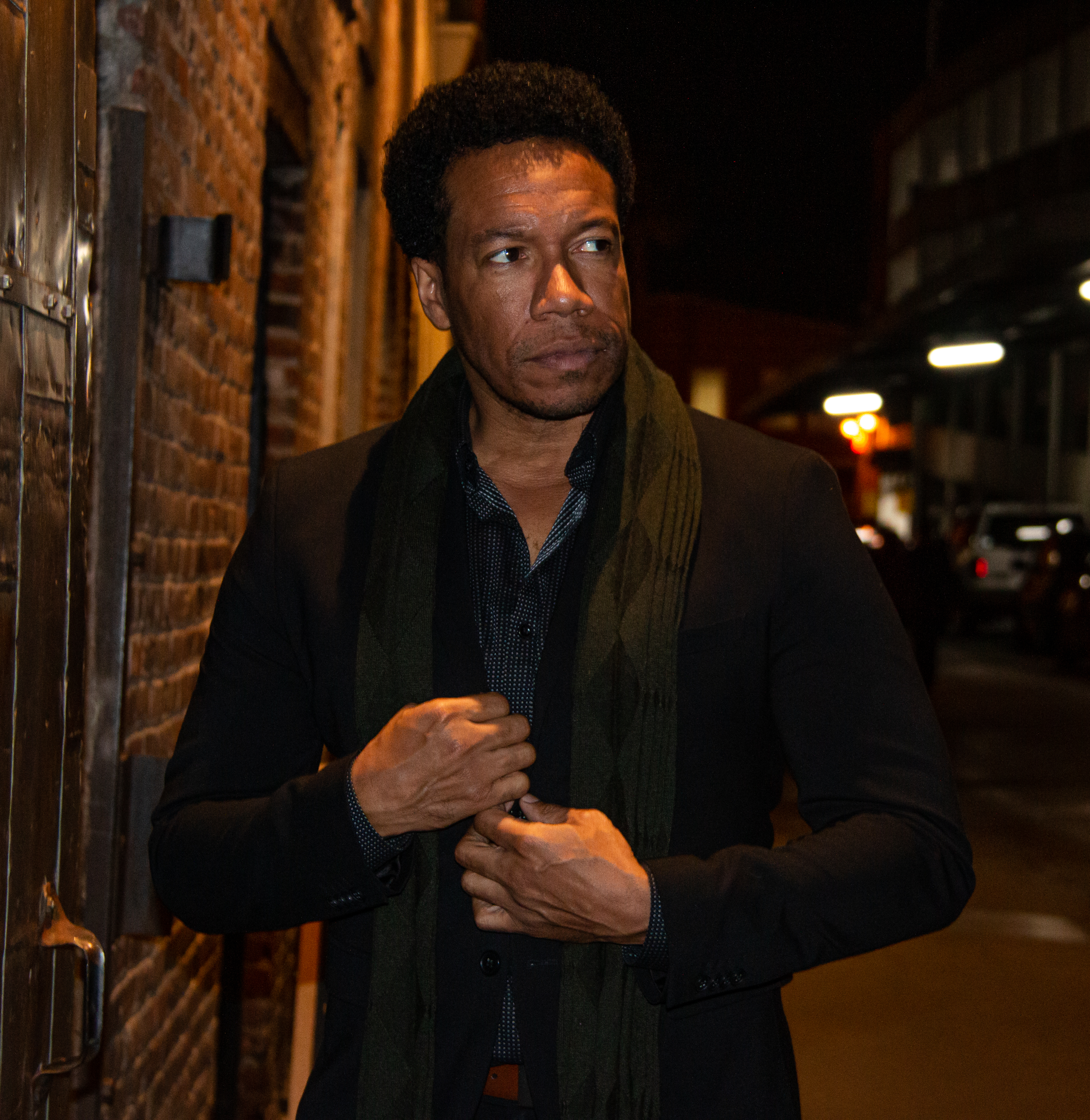
- Born: March 10, 1968 (age 58); Seaside, California
- Occupation: Actor
- Years active: 1989–present

Rico Elliott Anderson is an American film and television actor who has appeared in over 90 TV shows, films, and commercials.

== Early life ==
Anderson was born in Seaside, California and is the oldest of eleven children on his mother's side (6 biological and 5 adopted), and the 3rd of 4 children on his father's side.

== Career ==
Anderson's list of film and television credits spans many decades, the most notable recurring TV roles being Herbie on the critically acclaimed Apple TV+ series Truth Be Told starring Octavia Spencer, as well as Cornelius Rayburn in The Drop: A Snowfall Saga and Willie Reddish in The Greatest. He has had guest appearances on FBI: International, I Think You Should Leave with Tim Robinson, S.W.A.T., The Orville, Star Trek: Renegades, The Rookie, Modern Family, Two and a Half Men, 2 Broke Girls, Bones, NCIS, Criminal Minds, Law & Order, The Bold and the Beautiful and Days of Our Lives.

== Select filmography ==
=== Television ===
2026	The_Greatest_(2026_TV_series)	Willie Reddish	4 Episodes
2026	The_Drop:_A_Snowfall_Saga	Cornelius Rayburn	3 Episodes
2025	Countdown_(American_TV_series)	Randall Tooks	Season 1, Episode 12
2023	I Think You Should Leave with Tim Robinson	Jack	Season 3, Episode 2
2023	FBI: International	Daniel LeDee	Season 2, Episode 9
2021	B Positive	Officer Nelson	Season 2, Episode 8
2019	Truth Be Told	Herbie	18 Episodes
2019	The Rookie	Amari	Season 2, Episode 6
2018	S.W.A.T.	Young Daniel Sr.	3 Episodes
2017	The Orville	Moclan Doctor	Season 1, Episode 3
2017	Goliath	Hank	Season 2, Episode 1
2017	Rosewood	Agent Fitzpatrick	Season 1, Episode 10, Bacterium & the Brothers Panitch
2017	The Mick	Officer	Season 1, Episode 12, The Wolf
2017	The Fosters	Swat #2	Season 4, Episode 1, Potential Energy
2016	Grey's Anatomy	Donnie	Season 12, Episode 24, Family Affair
2015	Code Black	Cop	Season 1, Episode 4, Sometimes It's A Zebra
2015	Star Trek: Renegades	Boras	Pilot
2012	Don't Trust the B— in Apartment 23	Reggie	Season 2, Episode 4, It's A Miracle...
2012	Two and a Half Men	M. P. Searle	Season 10, Episode 7, Avoid the Chinese Mustard
2012	Sullivan & Son	Mike	Season 1, Episode 2, The Bribe
2012	2 Broke Girls	MTA Guy	Season 1, Episode 22, And the Big Buttercream Breakthrough
2011	Love That Girl!	Officer Bradley	Fatal Attraction
2011	Modern Family	Policeman	Season 3, Episode 6, Go Bullfrogs!
2011	Days of Our Lives	Public Defender O'Neill	4 Episodes
2011	Law & Order: LA	Alec Bratton	Season 1, Episode 16, Big Rock Mesa
2010	Mike & Molly	Man	Season 1, Episode 3, First Kiss
2010	Weeds	Bartender	Season 6, Episode 3, Bartender
2010	The Bold and the Beautiful	Prison Guard	5 Episodes
2010	Justified	FBI Agent Murphy	Season 1, Episode 4, Long in the Tooth
2009	Dollhouse	Agent	2 Episodes
2009	Entourage	Reporter	Season 6, Episode 2, Amongst Friends
2009	Eleventh Hour	Dave	Season 1, Episode 16, Subway
2008	Chocolate News	Bernard	Season 1, Episode 1
2008	Root Of All Evil	Admissions Officer	Season 2, Episode 9, Strip Clubs vs Sororities
2008	Mind of Mencia	Black Guy	2 Episodes
2006	NCIS	Rick Samson	Season 4, Episode 10, Smoked
2006	The Shield	Eritano	Season 5, Episode 7, Man Inside

=== Film ===
Year	Title	Role	Notes
2023	Rite Of Passage	Dad	
2019	Get Gone	Ranger Rico	Action On Film International Film Festival - Best Supporting Actor
2018	Spinning Man	Reporter #1	
2017	5th Passenger	Captain Arnold Reguine	
2017	The Assassin's Apprentice	Blanco	
2017	Jaded	Charles	
2017	Runaway	Renzler	
2016	Dreams My Master	Ernie	Pasadena International Film Festival - Best Actor
2015	Fearless	Coach Carl	
2013	Things Never Said	Louis	
2009	The Harimaya Bridge	Grant Holder	
2007	Derek and Delila	Glen	
2006	Break-Down at El Mirage	Armand	
2005	The Urban Demographic	Bob Johnson	
2002	String Theory	Marcus	

=== Video Games ===
Year	Title	Role	Notes
2024	Stormgate	Captain Nero	
2015	Batman:_Arkham_Knight	Various	
