= Lola (1970 film) =

Film by Richard Donner

Twinky / Lola
- Theatrical release poster
- Directed by: Richard Donner
- Written by: Norman Thaddeus Vane
- Produced by: Clive Sharp
- Starring: Charles Bronson; Orson Bean; Honor Blackman; Michael Craig; Paul Ford; Jack Hawkins; Trevor Howard; Lionel Jeffries; Kay Medford; Robert Morley; Susan George
- Cinematography: Walter Lassally
- Edited by: Norman Wanstall
- Music by: John Scott
- Production companies: World Film Services; San Marco
- Distributed by: The Rank Organisation (UK)
- Release dates: 15 January 1970 (Metropole Victoria); 15 February 1970 (United Kingdom)
- Running time: 98 minutes
- Countries: Italy; United Kingdom
- Language: English
- Budget: £2 million

Lola (originally released as Twinky, also known as London Affair) is a 1970 romantic comedy drama film directed by Richard Donner and starring Charles Bronson and Susan George. It was written by Norman Thaddeus Vane. The London section of the film features a number of well known British actors in cameo roles.

== Plot ==
Scott, a thirty-eight-year-old writer of pornographic novels has fallen in love with a sixteen-year-old schoolgirl whilst living in a riverside apartment in London. Her parents are horrified. When Scott finds his visa to remain in Britain has expired, the couple get married in Scotland and move to New York, where his parents live. His parents are also horrified. Scott's brother Hal, an incompetent lawyer and literary agent, pressures Scott to deliver his next, and overdue, novel.

Despite the marriage, New York state law says that Lola must go to school. Tensions arise when she participates in a demonstration outside her high school. Attempting to drag her out of the crowd, Scott inadvertently punches a police officer, is arrested and sentenced to thirty days in jail. While there, Lola leaves Scott's parents house and secures an expensive apartment, also on the river, at a cheap price. After he is released early, Scott struggles to write his novel in order to earn a living, as Lola becomes a distraction in their apartment. After a bitter row, she runs away and after a search of several days is found by Scott hiding in the cellar. The reunited couple go to bed. When Scott awakes, Lola is gone, leaving only a farewell message on their blackboard. Scott is left alone with the cat. Meanwhile, Lola apparently returns to her old life with her school friends.

== Cast ==
- Charles Bronson as Scott Wardman
- Susan George as Twinky / Lola / Sybil Londonderry
- Orson Bean as Hal
- Honor Blackman as mummy
- Michael Craig as daddy
- Paul Ford as Mr Wardman
- Jack Hawkins as Judge Millington-Draper
- Trevor Howard as Twinky's grandfather
- Lionel Jeffries as solicitor
- Kay Medford as Mrs Wardman
- Robert Morley as Judge Roxborough
- Sue Lloyd as Ursula
- Eric Barker as Scottish clerk
- Erik Chitty as lawyer's elderly client
- Judith Furse as schoolmistress

== Production ==
The idea and script for the film was written by Norman Thaddeus Vane, which author Simon Richter believes was the key force behind the film. Vane's script has been suggested to be somewhat autobiographical, as it mirrors the author's own marriage to 16 year-old model Sarah Caldwell, whom he married in the mid-1960s when he was 38.

In October 1968 it was announced producer John Heyman had optioned Vane's original story.

The film was shot on location in London and New York City.

Richard Donner called it "a wonderful, silly little romantic comedy. The producer sold it to AIP. AIP brought it over here and re-cut, re-edited and re-dubbed it. They then added two scenes and called it LOLA and made it more of a sex thing." The director said the experience made him feel "like shit".

== Music ==
The title song and two other original numbers are composed and performed by Jim Dale.

== Release ==
The film had its world premiere at the Metropole Victoria in London on 15 January 1970. It opened in London on 15 February 1970. The film had an original UK runtime of 102 minutes by the British Board of Film Classification (BBFC) for cinema release in August 1969 with an A rating.

=== Home media ===
It was subsequently released on VHS and DVD with the film re-edited and cut to a 94 and 88 minute runtime.

== Reception ==
=== Critical response ===
The Monthly Film Bulletin wrote: "With a frenzied assortment of fashionable tricks (frozen frames, slow motion runs, speeded-up bicycle rides), an insistent pop score, a gratuitous hippy party and yards of exposed teenage thigh, Richard Donner drives what one hopes will be the final nail into the coffin of the Swinging Sixties. The film is predicated on the irresistible appeal of its nymphet heroine and on the assumption that her first fumblings towards maturity are of riveting psychological interest; but since she is surrounded by a family of cutely kooky characters ... it is hard to take problems seriously, the more so since the unbelievably fey dialogue with which she is saddled ...does little to elucidate the processes of the adolescent mind at work. Susan George, who has elsewhere shown herself an actress of some promise, can do little with the part which, with the camera moving in for close-up after close-up of her tossing blonde hair, takes on the nightmare quality of a ninety-minute shampoo commercial."

The Radio Times Guide to Films gave the film 1/5 stars, writing: "Richard Donner directs this abysmal relic from Swinging London that not even its distinguished supporting cast can salvage. Susan George plays a 16-year-old schoolgirl who elopes with an American novelist played by Charles Bronson. Both sets of parents are appalled. The audience is, too."

The Contemporary North American Film Directors: A Wallflower Critical Guide state that the film exploited "the sexual freedom of its era", describing Susan George's character as a "naive young nymphet".

Leslie Halliwell said: "Dreary sex comedy drama, the fag end of London's swinging sixties."
