= India Rose Hemsworth =

Australian actress (born 2012)

- Born: 11 May 2012 (age 14); London, England
- Citizenship: British; Australian; Spanish
- Occupation: Actress
- Years active: 2022–present
- Parents: Chris Hemsworth (father); Elsa Pataky (mother)
- Relatives: Luke Hemsworth (uncle); Liam Hemsworth (uncle); Joanne van Os (great-aunt)

India Rose Hemsworth (born 11 May 2012) is an Australian and British actress. She has appeared in Thor: Love and Thunder (2022), Furiosa: A Mad Max Saga (2024), and Avengers: Doomsday (2026).

== Early life ==
Hemsworth was born on 11 May 2012 in London, to Australian actor Chris Hemsworth and Spanish-Romanian model-actress Elsa Pataky. In 2015, her family moved from Los Angeles to Byron Bay, New South Wales, Australia. She is fluent in both English and Spanish. She trains in Brazilian jiu-jitsu under Thalison Soares, and has competed in national tournaments.

== Career ==
In 2022, Hemsworth appeared as Love in Thor: Love and Thunder (2022), a role which she is set to reprise in Avengers: Doomsday (2026). In 2024, she appeared in Furiosa: A Mad Max Saga (2024).

== Filmography ==
=== Film ===
Year	Title	Role	Notes
2022	Thor: Love and Thunder	Love	
2024	Furiosa: A Mad Max Saga	Girl	
2026	Avengers: Doomsday †	Love	Post-production

=== Television ===
Year	Title	Role	Notes
2022	Marvel Studios: Assembled	Herself	Episode: "The Making of Thor: Love and Thunder"
2022	Limitless with Chris Hemsworth	Herself	Episode: "Fasting"
