= Mrs. Brown, You've Got a Lovely Daughter (film) =

1968 British musical comedy by Saul Swimmer

- Directed by: Saul Swimmer
- Written by: Thaddeus Vane
- Produced by: Allen Klein
- Starring: Herman's Hermits; Stanley Holloway
- Cinematography: Jack Hildyard
- Edited by: Tristam Cones
- Production company: Ivorygate Films
- Distributed by: Metro-Goldwyn-Mayer
- Release date: 12 June 1968 (US)
- Running time: 96 minutes
- Country: United Kingdom
- Language: English

Mrs. Brown, You've Got a Lovely Daughter is a 1968 British musical comedy film directed by Saul Swimmer and starring Herman's Hermits and Stanley Holloway. It was written by Thaddeus Vane and produced by Allen Klein.

It was Herman's Hermits' second starring feature, as well as their third and last film for Metro-Goldwyn-Mayer, following When the Boys Meet the Girls (1965) and Hold On! (1966).

== Plot ==
Herman Tulley inherits a prize greyhound called Mrs. Brown and aims to race the dog and win the derby in London. Herman and his group, The Hermits, play gigs to raise money for the race entry fees. After Mrs. Brown wins the preliminaries in Manchester, The Hermits travel to London for the big race. However, they must again raise money to enter their greyhound, so they make arrangements for more concerts and also take up temporary employment at G.G. Brown's fruit market. During this time, Herman falls for Judy, an aspiring young model who is the Browns' daughter, but Herman's neighbourhood friend Tulip has her sights set on him. Mrs. Brown wins the London race, but is later lost by Herman after he ties her to a baggage cart at a busy railway station. She eventually is found by a street entertainer and returned and gives birth to a "daughter." Judy does modelling in Rome. Herman winds up moving on with the hint of a possible relationship with Tulip.

== Cast ==
- Peter Noone as Herman Tulley
- Keith Hopwood as Keith
- Derek Leckenby as Derek
- Karl Green as Karl
- Barry Whitwam as Barry
- Stanley Holloway as G.G. Brown
- Mona Washbourne as Mrs. Brown
- Marjorie Rhodes as grandma Gloria
- Lance Percival as Percy the tramp
- Sheila White as Tulip
- Sarah Caldwell as Judy Brown
- Hugh Futcher as Swothard
- Drewe Henley as Clive
- Avis Bunnage as Tulip's mother
- John Sharp as Oakshot
- Tom Kempinski as Hobart
- Nat Jackley as pub singer
- Margery Manners as pub singer
- Billy Milton as landlord
- Dermot Kelly as con man
- Joan Hickson as landlady
- Lynda Baron as Miss Fisher
- Annette Crosbie as maid
- Pamela Cundell as woman on embankment
- Jessie Robins as woman in pub

== Production ==
In December 1965, an article in Billboard magazine announced that Allen Klein would be producing a film based on the song "Mrs. Brown, You've Got a Lovely Daughter", starring Herman's Hermits for Metro-Goldwyn-Mayer. "Mrs. Brown" had been a US number one hit for the group earlier that year. Klein was the American business manager of Herman's Hermits' producer, Mickie Most.

In May 1967, Billboard revealed production had begun in England with Morton DaCosta as director. The article announced the film as an Allen Klein & Co. production, although the company's name does not appear in the final print. Klein was able to secure financing for the film by convincing MGM's record division, which distributed Herman's Hermits' music in America, to "advance money against [the group's] future royalties".

Sarah Caldwell, who played the role of Judy Brown, was the 16-year old wife of the film's screenwriter Norman Thaddeus Vane, who was 38 when production started.

In early June, DaCosta was dismissed from the production and replaced by Saul Swimmer. (Note: Klein did not directly fire DaCosta, instead assigning the task to his associate Abbey Butler.) Swimmer had previously worked with Klein on the film Without Each Other (1962). Filming took place at Shepperton Studios and on location around London and Manchester, including King's Cross Station, Covent Garden, St Katharine Docks and the Great West Road. The greyhound racing scenes were shot at the Catford Stadium and White City Stadium. The film's sets were designed by the art director George Provis. Production wrapped in mid-July.

== Soundtrack ==
Graham Gouldman composed five of the eight new songs featured in the film. John Paul Jones arranged the soundtrack. Most is credited in the film as music supervisor. Ron Goodwin provided additional music. Herman's Hermits recorded a new version of the title song for the film, while the original single version appears during the end credits. "There's a Kind of Hush", which also appears in the film, had been a top ten hit for Herman's Hermits in the US and UK in early 1967. The film's soundtrack album was released by MGM Records in the US and EMI's Columbia label in the UK.

== Release ==
Mrs. Brown, You've Got a Lovely Daughter was originally planned for release in the fall of 1967, before being delayed to spring 1968. The film opened in Detroit on 12 June 1968. The film later received a G rating from the Motion Picture Association of America. In September, the film opened in London.

=== Home media ===
In 1984, MGM/UA Home Video released the film on VHS. On 19 April 2011, the film was released on DVD as part of the Warner Archive Collection.

== Critical reception ==
The Monthly Film Bulletin wrote: "Another mongrel child born out of English neo-realism (clean linen waving like flags from the washing lines of picturesque northern slums) and the myth of a trendy London in which all the younger people are connected with a colour supplement and dressed in last year's gear. Although Herman and his Hermits rush eagerly around England's principal tourist attractions and everyone involved displays an indomitable (and presumably exportable) cheeriness, the message that emerges is a sadly negative one: the world is for the young, or as the heroine puts it, "One only has a few super years". It is characteristic of the film's ephemeral and pathetically swinging world that when Judy tells Herman that she's going to Rome (via St. Pancras, incidentally) for six weeks, he should automatically assume "It's all over, then"."

Kine Weekly wrote: "So far as British pop-musicals go, this is pretty much the mixture as before. The hero is a nice simple lad living in humble status who is at first dazzled by the rapid glitter of success but in the end realises the true value of life in the station to which he was born. Wholesome, moral stuff, not unentertaining, but not wildly exciting."

The Independent Film Journal wrote: "A genial, light-hearted attempt to parlay a hit jukebox record into a hit movie attraction. With Herman's Hermits, especially Peter Noone (Herman) on center-stage for most of the film's running time, the outing should prove popular with the singing group's fans."

In DVD Talk, Bill Gibron wrote "It's almost impossible to embrace this movie as well made and amusing. It is an entertaining antique, but that's about it."

In The Spinning Image, Graeme Clark described the film as "something of an improvement on the Hermits' previous movie, Hold On!...The songs are better...what you're left with is an artefact that was not intended to last down the ages, but has anyway."
