= Hop-Scotch Polka =

1949 popular song

Single by Guy Lombardo and His Royal Canadians
- B-side: "Dangerous Dan McGrew"
- Released: 1949
- Genre: Pop
- Length: 2:51
- Label: Decca
- Songwriter(s): Billy Whitlock; Carl Sigman; Gene Rayburn

"Hop-Scotch Polka (Scotch Hot)" is a popular song based on the Billy Whitlock composition "Scotch Hot", with new lyrics added by Gene Rayburn and Carl Sigman. The song was published on July 6, 1949, by Cromwell Music, Inc., and was soon recorded by several artists, including Art Mooney for M-G-M Records, Guy Lombardo and His Royal Canadians for Decca Records, Margery Manners, and the Three Suns for RCA-Victor. Guy Lombardo's recording peaked at number 11 in the United States, and Art Mooney's version peaked at number 16.

In 1950, the song found an audience in Australia, where both the Guy Lombardo and Art Mooney recordings reached the number-one spot on the Australian chart.

== Charts ==
Chart (1950)	Peak position
Australia	1
US	11
