= Midnight (1989 film) =

1989 film by Norman Thaddeus Vane

- Theatrical release poster
- Directed by: Norman Thaddeus Vane
- Written by: Norman Thaddeus Vane
- Produced by: Norman Thaddeus Vane; Gloria J. Morrison
- Starring: Lynn Redgrave; Tony Curtis; Steve Parrish; Rita Gam; Gustav Vintas; Karen Witter; Frank Gorshin; Wolfman Jack
- Cinematography: David Golia
- Edited by: David Bartholomew; Sam Adelman
- Music by: Michael Wetherwax
- Production companies: SVS Films; Midnight Inc.
- Distributed by: SVS Films
- Release date: July 1989
- Country: United States
- Language: English

Midnight is a 1989 American comedy horror film written and directed by Norman Thaddeus Vane and starring Lynn Redgrave and Tony Curtis.

== Synopsis ==
Sultry late-night horror film hostess Midnight has the highest-rated show on television. Mr. B is scheming to steal the rights to the show. The tug of war begins and soon escalates into a deadly conflict.

== Cast ==
- Lynn Redgrave as Midnight
- Tony Curtis as Mr. B
- Steve Parrish as Mickey Modine
- Karen Witter as Missy Angel
- Frank Gorshin as Ron Saphier
- Robert Miano as Arnold
- Rita Gam as Heidi
- Gustav Vintas as Siegfried
- Wolfman Jack as himself
- Robert Axelrod as Ozzie
- Nathan Le Grand as Hank
- Barry Diamond as Wally
- Ron Max as detective
- Tommy "Tiny" Lister as security guard
- Kathleen Kinmont as party
