= The Black Room (1982 film) =

- Promotional poster
- Directed by: Elly Kenner; Norman Thaddeus Vane
- Written by: Norman Thaddeus Vane
- Produced by: Aaron C. Butler
- Starring: Stephen Knight; Cassandra Gava; Jimmy Stathis; Clara Perryman
- Cinematography: Robert Harmon
- Music by: Art Podell; James Ackley
- Production companies: Butler-Cronin Productions; Lancer Productions Limited; Ram Productions
- Release date: March 1984 (US)
- Running time: various; Vestron VHS lists 88 minutes.
- Country: United States
- Language: English
- Budget: $40,000

The Black Room is a 1982 American horror film directed by Elly Kenner and written and co-directed by Norman Thaddeus Vane. It stars Stephen Knight, Cassandra Gava, Jimmy Stathis, and Clara Perryman, and features Christopher McDonald and Linnea Quigley in small, early roles. The plot concerns siblings who lure swingers to their Hollywood mansion, kill them, then - with long scenes of blood transfusions - drain their blood. Though there is no classical vampirism in the film—in the sense of supernatural beings or blood drinking—the plot's focus on draining blood to prolong life has led to many sources considering it a vampire film.

== Plot ==
Bored suburban husband and father Larry (Jimmy Stathis) surreptitiously rents a room in the Hollywood Hills mansion owned by Bridget (Cassandra Gava) and her brother Jason (Stephen Knight), who is suffering from a rare blood disorder which requires frequent transfusions. Larry uses his new rental property to bring various willing women for the purposes of sex, while Jason and Bridget watch through a secret peep hole. Unbeknownst to Larry, however, once he departs the scene, Bridget and Jason capture his sex partners and drain their blood in an effort to prolong Jason's life. Eventually, Larry's wife Robin (Clara Perryman) discovers his infidelity. While initially hurt and angry, she soon decides to rent the "black room" for her own sexual purposes. When Larry finds out his wife is also cheating on him, he becomes angry and jealous, arguing with her and finally agreeing to cease his illicit activities in exchange for her doing the same. Both partners agree to cease their activities in "the black room." They soon discover, however, that Jason and Bridget have kidnapped their two children, and plan to drain their blood. A fight ensues, during which both Jason and Bridget appear to be killed—Bridget is stabbed to death and Jason is drowned in a bathtub full of blood—and the married couple escape with their kids. The film ends, however, with both corpses inexplicably reanimating, while Robin wonders aloud if "people like that ever really die?"

== Cast ==
- Stephen Knight as Jason
- Cassandra Gava as Bridget (as Cassandra Gaviola)
- Jimmy Stathis as Larry
- Clara Perryman as Robin
- Linnea Quigley as Milly
- Christopher McDonald as Terry
- Sheila Reid as Female Lover

== Reception ==
In his book Horror Films of the 1980s (vol 1) writer John Kenneth Muir situates the film within the context of the "precautionary tales" which define 1980's horror cinema, in which "married people step out of accepted social mores [usually involving sex] only to see their families threatened by their irresponsible actions." He also notes that the film "seem to understand, very early in the age of AIDS, the 'loaded' nature of hypodermic needles and the danger of contaminated blood in transfusions."

Kurt Loder of Rolling Stone called the film, "...a bizarre obscurity that, by any prevailing critical standpoint, completely lives up to its plot line's utter lack of promise....an inert and inscrutably obsessive film."

In their notes for a modern screening of the film, Alamo Drafthouse Cinema notes that "THE BLACK ROOM eerily occupies the brief period in American genre films following the close of the swinging 1970s but predating the AIDS and crack/cocaine epidemics of the '80s. From its lingering shots of hypodermic needles and blood coursing through transfusion tubes into track-scarred arms to its fascination with voyeurism, promiscuity and gratification, it's definitely a film ahead of its time."
