= Margery Manners =

British variety performer (1926–1997)

- Birth name: Margery Manners
- Born: 18 March 1926; Coventry, Warwickshire, England
- Died: 27 April 1997 (aged 71); Paddington, Greater London, England
- Occupation(s): Variety performer, singer and actress

Margery Manners (18 March 1926 – 27 April 1997) was a music hall and variety performer, singer, television actress and radio performer. She was best known for her signature stage tune, "Bring Me the Sunshine of Your Smile".

== Early life ==
Manners was born in 1926 in Coventry, Warwickshire. She began performing in concerts in the working men's clubs of Birmingham when she was 8 years old. She learned how to sing, as well as play the guitar and accordion.

== Career ==
Manners became a professional performer at 12 years old, when she joined the popular 1930s show band Billy Merrin and his Commanders. At 14, she toured the music halls singing as a "cowgirl crooner" with another show band, Big Bill Campbell and his Rocky Mountain Rhythm.

From the age of 16, Manners became a well known pantomime principal boy, topping theatre bills across the UK. She performed at venues including the London Palladium, Palace Pier Theatre in Brighton, Alhambra in Bradford, and the Royal Court Theatre in Liverpool. The song "Bring Me the Sunshine of Your Smile" became her signature stage tune, and she was also known for performing songs such as "Have I Told You Lately that I Love You?" and "Hop Scotch Polka".

During World War II, she worked as a radio broadcaster on the BBC lunchtime series Workers' Playtime.

In 1957, Manners starred in the last performance held at the Theatre Royal in Leeds, which was about to be pulled down. In 1969, she toured variety theatres across Britain with the double act Bob and Alf Pearson in a nostalgic bill called The Golden Years of Music Hall. During the 1970s, she toured in South Africa and New Zealand.

Manners also appeared in variety television shows including BBC Sunday-Night Play, The Passing Show and The Good Old Days. She performed as a pub singer in the 1968 film Mrs. Brown, You've Got a Lovely Daughter.

== Death ==
Manners died of cancer on 27 April 1997 at St Mary's Hospital, London, aged 71.
