= Sacramento County Jail =

Jail in California, United States

Coordinates: 38°34′59″N 121°29′51″W

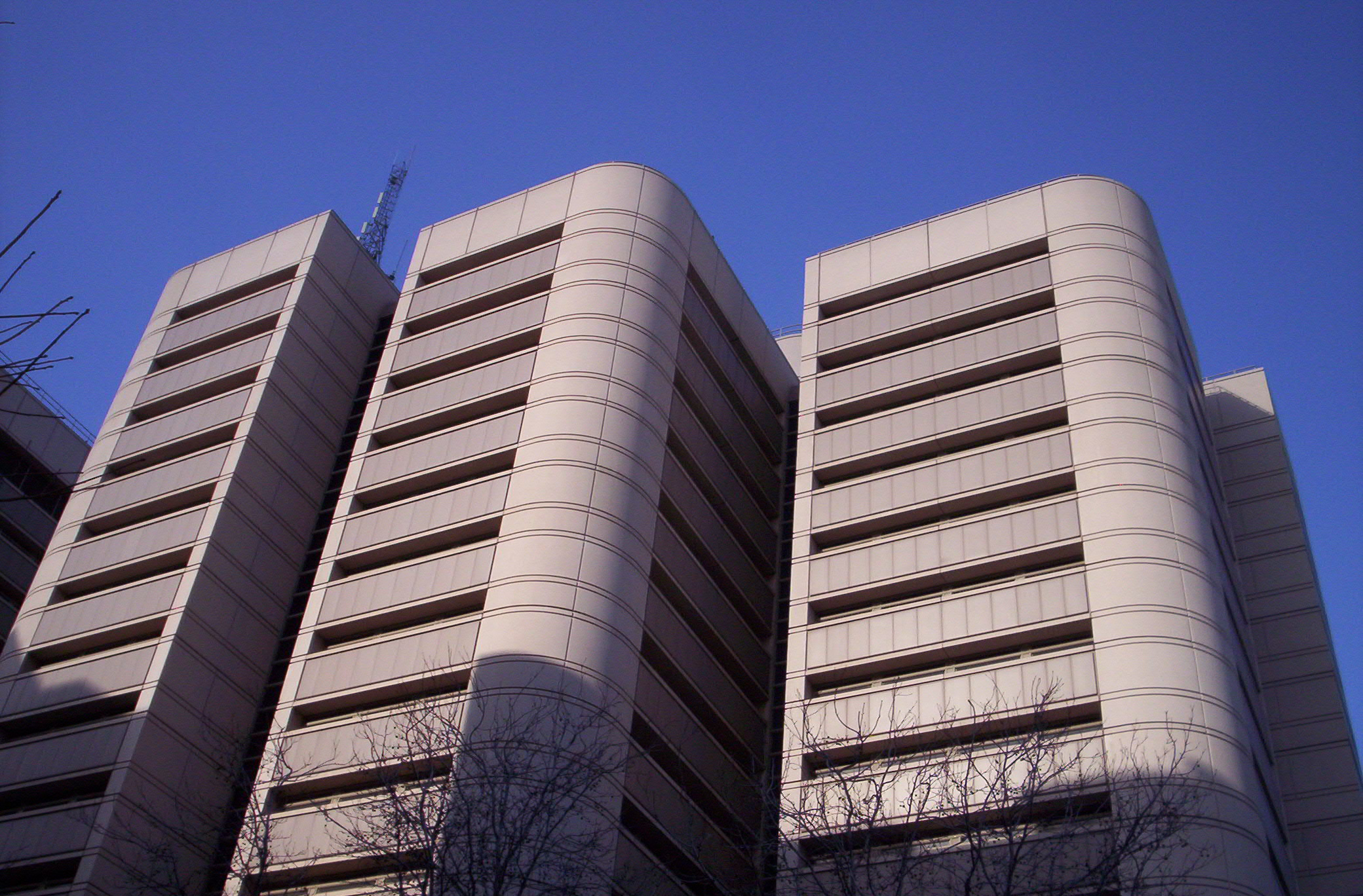
Sacramento County Jail

1984 photograph of the Sacramento County Sheriff's Jail, which was demolished in 1989

The Sacramento County Jail is one of the county jails for the Sacramento County area of the US State of California, serviced by the Sacramento County Sheriff's Department. It is located on 651 I Street, approximately 100 meters from Downtown Commons. Completed in 1989, the jail complex includes the Lorenzo Patiño Hall of Justice of the Sacramento County Superior Court. The jail replaces the Sacramento County Sheriff's Jail, formerly located at 620 I Street, which was demolished after the completion of this complex in 1989.

The jail has been operating under a federal consent decree since 1993.

== Famous inmates ==
- Theodore Kaczynski, Unabomber
- Eric McDavid, environmental activist and anarchist
- Dorothea Puente, American serial killer
- Nikolay Soltys, Ukrainian-American spree killer
