= Frightmare (video game) =

1988 video game

- Developer: Floppy
- Publishers: Accolade (US); Cascade Games (UK)
- Platforms: MS-DOS, Commodore 64, ZX Spectrum
- Release: UK: 1988; US: 1989
- Genre: Platform
- Mode: Single-player

Frightmare is a platform game published in 1988 by Accolade under their Avantage budget label and in the UK by Cascade Games. It was released on floppy disk for MS-DOS, ZX Spectrum, and Commodore 64.

== Gameplay ==
The game is a platformer where players control a character within a dreamworld trying to overcome a nightmare. Players encounter enemies including ghosts, ghoulies, and monsters and must avoid them by jumping and climbing around them, or must defeat them using a variety of weapons. Players progress through many screens across various levels to complete the game by advancing the alarm clock from midnight to 8:12 A.M.

== Reception ==
Frightmare

Review scores
Publication	Score
Computer and Video Games	8
The Games Machine	71%
ACE Magazine	28

Richard C. Leinecker, reviewing the MS-DOS version of the game for Compute! magazine, noted that the game suffered from poor documentation containing numerous errors. The documentation also only explained how to use a joystick, although the game can be played with a keyboard. He also found bugs such as the character sprite appearing out of position, either just above or below ledges and objects in the game. He speculated that the sloppy programming may be a consequence of trying to keep costs down for a budget title.
