= Robert Miano =

American actor (born 1942)

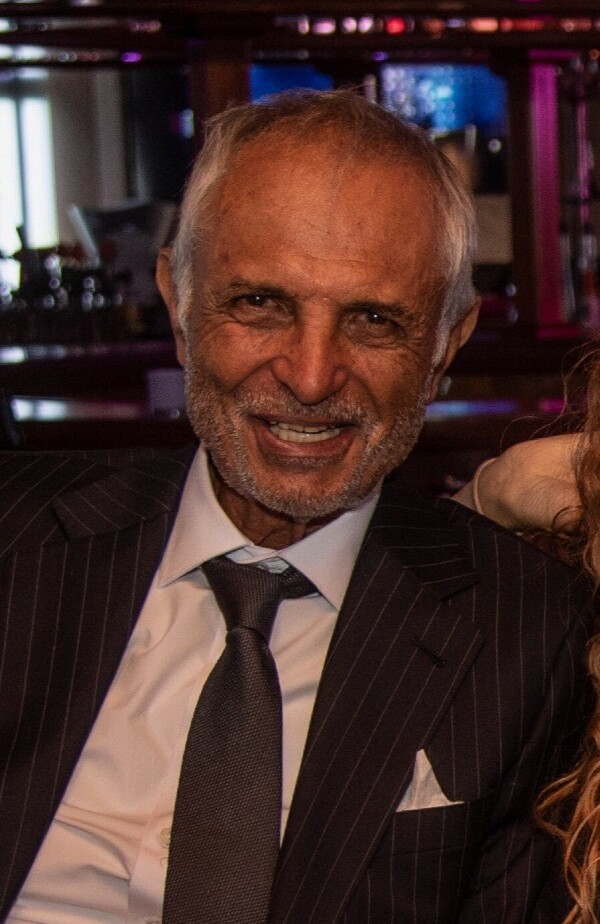
- Miano in 2021
- Born: September 25, 1942 (age 84); New York City, New York, U.S.
- Occupation: Actor
- Years active: 1972–present
- Spouse: Silvia Spross (m. 2014)

Robert Miano (born September 25, 1942) is an American actor.

== Early life ==
Robert Miano was born in New York City and raised in the Southeast Bronx neighborhood. He is of Italian descent.

At the age of fifteen Miano was discovered by a talent agent who happened to pass by a street corner in the Bronx and heard Miano singing with a doo-wop group. This would lead to a recording of "Kingdom Of Love" by the Preludes on the Cub Label, a new subsidiary of MGM Records.

Years later, at an open casting call, Miano auditioned for the lead rock singer in the play "Satyricon" and landed the role. The musical was presented at the Stratford Shakespearean Festival in Ontario, Canada. Subsequently, Miano spent several years traveling around Europe as a troubadour where he performed musical acts by singing and playing his guitar on the streets and in restaurants.

== Career ==
When Miano returned to New York City, he took up method acting studies with Lee Strasberg and Warren Robertson. It was during this time in the mid '70s that Miano garnered attention from numerous directors including Michael Winner, Howard W. Koch, and Chuck Workman, among others.

Upon his relocation to Los Angeles, Miano honed in on his craft as a character actor for over thirty years, appearing in hundreds of feature films and numerous television programs. He is perhaps best known for repeatedly playing mobster characters.

In 1994 and 1995, Miano played Bronx mob boss Joe Scully on the soap opera General Hospital. There his character was the one-time mentor and possible future rival to resident mobster Sonny Corinthos. Miano also portrayed real-life Bonanno crime family capo Alphonse "Sonny Red" Indelicato in the 1997 film Donnie Brasco, alongside Al Pacino, Michael Madsen, and Johnny Depp. He also co-starred in the film The Funeral, with Christopher Walken, Chris Penn, and Benicio del Toro. Miano played a mobster character called "Frankie Eyes" on the sci-fi series Star Trek: Deep Space Nine and real-life Mafia boss Vito Genovese in the 1999 television film Lansky, written by David Mamet.

== Filmography ==
Film
| Year | Title | Role | Notes |
|---|---|---|---|
| 1973 | Badge 373 | Sweet William's Hood | |
| 1974 | Death Wish | Mugger | |
| 1976 | The Money | Steve Eppinonoymus | |
| 1976 | Alex & The Gypsy | Young Shepard | |
| 1982 | Vice Squad | Duty Seargent | |
| 1982 | The Concrete Jungle | Stone | |
| 1982 | Kiss Me Goodbye | Michael | |
| 1983 | Chained Heat | Stone | |
| 1984 | Firestarter | Blinded Agent | |
| 1984 | Fear City | Hitman #2 Minor | |
| 1986 | Club Life | Ferd | |
| 1986 | Hollywood Vice Squad | Luchessi | |
| 1987 | China Girl | Enrico Perito | |
| 1987 | Open House | Shapiro | |
| 1987 | Weeds | Parole Board | |
| 1988 | Traxx | Arturo | |
| 1989 | Midnight | Arnold | |
| 1989 | Easy Wheels | Nick | |
| 1989 | Ministry of Vengeance | Ali Aboud | |
| 1990 | Blue Desert | William Karp | |
| 1990 | The Rain Killer | Allenby | |
| 1991 | Hangfire | 'Ace' | |
| 1991 | Driving Me Crazy | Omar | |
| 1991 | The Last Hour | Frankie | |
| 1991 | Diplomatic Immunity | Serrano | |
| 1991 | A Time to Die | Eddie | |
| 1992 | Out for Blood | Jerry Geisler | |
| 1992 | Bikini Summer II | Joshua | |
| 1993 | Silver | Detective Howard | |
| 1993 | Deadly Rivals | The Interrogator | |
| 1993 | Quest of the Delta Knights | Incense Merchant | (Video) |
| 1993 | No Escape No Return | Larry | |
| 1993 | Midnight Kiss | Captain Nicoletti | |
| 1993 | GodFather III Screen Test | Unknown | (Video short) |
| 1994 | Taxi Dancers | Miguelito | |
| 1994 | Lookin' Italian | Charlie | |
| 1994 | 3 Ninjas Kick Back | Shuttle Driver | |
| 1994 | Guardian Angel | David | |
| 1994 | Night of the Archer | Oscar Lucci | |
| 1995 | Ballistic | Businessman | |
| 1995 | Uninhibited | 'Papa' Escobar | |
| 1996 | Overkill | Ben Anderson | |
| 1996 | Irresistible Impulse | Detective Nicolette | (Video) |
| 1996 | The Funeral | Enrico | |
| 1996 | The Killer Inside | Detective Nicoletti | |
| 1997 | Opposite Corners | Carmine | |
| 1997 | Donnie Brasco | Alphonse 'Sonny Red' Indelicato | |
| 1997 | Laws of Deception | Raymond Kelsey | |
| 1997 | Executive Target | Jack | |
| 1997 | Lesser Prophets | Sal | |
| 1998 | Smoke Signals | Burt Cicero | |
| 1998 | Matter of Trust | Ben | |
| 1998 | Back to Even | Volanta | |
| 1998 | Detour | Gianni Grasso | (Video) |
| 1998 | Butter | Visconti | |
| 1998 | The Last Siege: Never Surrender | John Gathers | |
| 1998 | The Perfect Shadow | Joaquin | |
| 1999 | Thick as Thieves | Riles | |
| 1999 | Malevolence | Holbrook | |
| 1999 | Unconditional Love | Harry Peskel | |
| 1999 | Cool Crime | Uncle Bruce | |
| 1999 | Two Shades of Blue | Alvin Stone | |
| 1999 | Running Red | Chambers | (Video) |
| 1999 | Ballad of the Nightingale | Uncle Frankie | |
| 1999 | Hitman's Run | Dominic Catania | |
| 1999 | Storm Catcher | General William Jacobs | |
| 1999 | She's Too Tall | Omar | |
| 1999 | Night of Terror | Unknown | (Video) |
| 2000 | Luckytown | Tony DeCarlo | |
| 2000 | Our Lips Are Sealed | Emil Hatchew | |
| 2000 | Dungeons & Dragons | Azmath | |
| 2000 | The Black Rose | Agent Marzetti | |
| 2002 | The Stickup | Lieutenant Vincent Marino | |
| 2002 | Whacked! | Salvatore 'Lucky Salvatore' | |
| 2002 | Cock & Bull Story | Charlie Murray | |
| 2002 | Turn of Faith | Louie Muro | |
| 2003 | Studio City | Carmine | (Short) |
| 2003 | Submarines | Sajid Kahn | (Video) |
| 2004 | Killer Weekend | Detective Luke Nicolleti | |
| 2004 | Sin's Kitchen | Vinnie | |
| 2004 | Shadow of Fear | Mr. Davis | |
| 2005 | Edison | Droste | |
| 2005 | Today You Die | Bruno | (Video) |
| 2005 | Chasing Ghosts | Anthony Parramatti | |
| 2005 | Confessions of a Pit Fighter | Mario | |
| 2005 | The Story of Bob | Officer Paul Fiorentino | (Short) |
| 2005 | Devil's Highway | Joe | |
| 2006 | Unbeatable Harold | Drunk Customer | |
| 2006 | Even Money | Pit Boss | |
| 2006 | The Still Life | Mr. Rifken | |
| 2006 | Vagabond | Ivan Mangele | |
| 2006 | The System Within | Richard Lord | |
| 2007 | Sugar Creek | Pete St. Clair | |
| 2007 | You're So Dead | Julius | |
| 2007 | The Indian | Dr. Reed | |
| 2007 | The Third Nail | Father Antonio | |
| 2007 | No Names | Unknown | (Short) |
| 2007 | Lady Samurai | Ian Stanley | |
| 2008 | The Stick Up Kids | Levine | (Video) |
| 2008 | Safe House | Antonio Moffa | |
| 2008 | Fashion Victim | Gianni Versace | |
| 2008 | David & Fatima | Dr. Levi | |
| 2008 | 2:22 | Willy | |
| 2008 | Exact Bus Fare | Razelli | (Short) |
| 2008 | The Beneficiary | Peter | (Short) |
| 2008 | Waiting for the Miracle | Fulci | (Short) |
| 2008 | The Sit Down | Paulie | (Short) |
| 2008 | Resurrection County | Parson | |
| 2009 | Without | Man #2 | (Short) |
| 2009 | Fast & Furious | Braga Double | |
| 2009 | Giallo | Inspector Mori | |
| 2009 | Sarah's Choice | Henry | (Video) |
| 2010 | American Mobster | Marco Leone | |
| 2010 | Cage Free | Detective Gonzalez | |
| 2010 | Death Calls | FBI Agent Padilla | |
| 2010 | Nightbeasts | Straw Hat Man | |
| 2010 | Awakening Arthur | Arthur | (Short) |
| 2010 | Underground | Unknown | |
| 2010 | Little Fockers | Party Parent | |
| 2010 | The Sinners | The Father | |
| 2010 | Minor League: A Football Story | Coach Whistler | |
| 2010 | Family Virtues | Unknown | (Short) |
| 2010 | Boston Girls | Sergeant Joseph Scotto | |
| 2011 | Memphis Rising: Elvis Returns | Nicoletti | |
| 2011 | Impulse Black | Dr. Max Osbourne | |
| 2011 | Mysteria | Aleister | |
| 2011 | Brotherhood | Nico Palermo | |
| 2011 | A Comic Trap | Waldbalm | (Video short) |
| 2012 | Locked in a Room | Attorney Kelogg | |
| 2012 | A Kiss and a Promise | Detective Joseph Bello | |
| 2012 | The Final Shift | Maslow | |
| 2012 | A Fallen Angel | Cerberus | (Short) |
| 2012 | Rose's Diet | Vito | (Short) |
| 2012 | The Encounter: Paradise Lost | Bruno Mingarelli | |
| 2012 | Beyond the Trophy | Gino Del Porto | |
| 2012 | Revan | Silvani | |
| 2012 | Piece of a Cake | Fettucini | |
| 2012 | Match Made | Charlie | (Short) |
| 2013 | Lady of RAGE | The Smithsonian | (Short) |
| 2013 | Broken Blood | Capra | |
| 2013 | Samuel Bleak | Reverend John | |
| 2013 | Revelation Road: The Beginning of the End | Narrator (voice) | |
| 2013 | The Book of Esther | Mordecai | |
| 2013 | The Cloth | Lewis | |
| 2013 | Independence | Tom | (Video short) |
| 2013 | Chavez Cage of Glory | Bret Johnson | |
| 2013 | Blood of Redemption | Sergio 'Serge' Grimaldi | |
| 2013 | The Book of Daniel | Old Daniel | |
| 2013 | Pendejo (Idiot) | Rodney | |
| 2013 | 63lbs | Mr. Prescot | (Short) |
| 2014 | Lost in Gray | Frank | (Short) |
| 2014 | Reflections | Dr. Grimaldi | (Short) |
| 2014 | No Loose Ends | Unknown | (Short) |
| 2014 | Being American | Atash | |
| 2014 | In the Company of Strangers | Mr. Greenberg | |
| 2015 | An Act of War | 'Sully' Sullivan | |
| 2015 | Til the Dust Is Gone | Unknown | (Short) |
| 2015 | If I Tell You I Have to Kill You | Detective Wilkes | |
| 2015 | No Way Out | Rodolfo | |
| 2015 | The Two Pamelas | Detective Galento | |
| 2015 | Ghost Aliens | Dr. Stewart | |
| 2016 | The Green Fairy | Schwyzerdutsch | (Documentary) |
| 2016 | Tunnel Vision | Robert French | (Short) |
| 2016 | Last Stop | Albert | |
| 2016 | A Fighting Chance | Bob | (Short) |
| 2016 | Parasites | Wilco | |
| 2016 | Assassin X | Joey | |
| 2016 | Happy Birthday | 'El Gato' Enfermo | |
| 2016 | Bloody Bobby | Old Man Granger | |
| 2016 | A Winter Rose | Jimmy | |
| 2016 | Emperor of the Free World | Giovanni | |
| 2017 | Call Me King | Elio | |
| 2017 | Girls Trip | Bob 'Hobo Bob' | |
| 2017 | Executor | Isaac | |
| 2017 | The Neighborhood | Joey 'Joey B' | |
| 2017 | Sunset Park | 'Gramps' Sarcione | |
| 2017 | Dream Wagon | Unknown | |
| 2017 | The American Connection | Bobby | |
| 2018 | Inheritance | Giovanni Delvecchio | |
| 2018 | The Actor | General Eugene Clark / Abdulrahman | |
| 2018 | Attack in LA | Wilco | |
| 2018 | Frank and Ava | Hank Sanicola | |
| 2018 | Defeated | Tony | |
| 2019 | Ian's Realm Saga Concept Film | Silvio 'The Wizard' | (Short) |
| 2019 | Get Gone | Don Maxwell | |
| 2019 | A Brief Wait | Unknown | (Short) |
| 2019 | Muna | Luca | |
| 2020 | Exorcism at 60,000 Feet | Father Romero | |
| 2020 | The Deep Ones | Russel Marsh | |
| 2023 | Mob Land | Ellis | |
| 2025 | Dorothea | Everson Theodore Gillmouth | |

Television
| Year | Title | Role | Notes |
|---|---|---|---|
| 1976 | The Streets of San Francisco | Joey Lucero | Episode: "Police Buff" |
| 1976 | Bridger | Modoc Leader | TV movie |
| 1976 | Spencer's Pilots | Pete Carlislie | Episode: "The Matchbook" |
| 1976 | Police Story | Cop #3 | Episode: "Thanksgiving" |
| 1977 | The Hardy Boys/Nancy Drew Mysteries | Roth | Episode: "The Creatures Who Came on Sunday" |
| 1979 | The Amazing Spider-Man | Assault Team Bravo member | Episode: "Wolfpack" |
| 1979 | How the West Was Won | Antoine | Episode: "L'Affaire Riel" |
| 1980 | Barnaby Jones | Hitman | Episode: "The Killing Point" |
| 1981 | CHiPs | Jesus | Episode: "Sharks" |
| 1981 | Fantasy Island | Cavalier | Episode: "Cyrano/The Magician" |
| 1984 | Cagney & Lacey | Jogger | Episode: "Insubordination" |
| 1985 | Finder of Lost Loves | Mechanic | Episode: "Tricks" |
| 1985 | A Death in California | Unknown | Episode #1.2 |
| 1985 | MacGyver | Black | Episode: "Target MacGyver" |
| 1982–1985 | T.J. Hooker | Alex Lucas / Ernie Hanks / George Coleman / Keller | 4 episodes |
| 1984–1985 | Knots Landing | Mechanic / 'Slim' | 2 episodes |
| 1986 | Outrage! | Santini | TV movie |
| 1986 | The A-Team | Unknown | Episode: "Alive at Five |
| 1987 | Hunter | Karl | Episode: "Straight to the Heart" |
| 1987 | Sidekicks | Chaffee | Episode: "Read Between the Lines" |
| 1987 | Crime Story | Phil Ross | Episode: "Robbery, Armed" |
| 1988 | Divorce Court | Mr. Conti | Episode: "Conti vs Conti" |
| 1988 | Sonny Spoon | Milton | Episode: "Ratman Can" |
| 1990 | El Diablo | Bandit #1 | TV movie |
| 1990 | Matlock | Ken Groman / William Hodges | Episode: "The Brothers" |
| 1991 | Jake and the Fatman | Manny Pacheco | Episode: "Pretty Baby" |
| 1991 | Superboy | Garrett Waters | Episode: "Wish for Armageddon" |
| 1991 | Blood Ties | Vampire Hunter #3 | TV movie |
| 1991 | Pros and Cons | Burns | Episode: "Fire and Ice" |
| 1993 | Bob | Robber | Episode: "I'm Getting Remarried in the Morning" |
| 1994 | Frasier | Rocco | Episode: "You Can't Tell a Crook by His Cover" |
| 1994 | Blindfold: Acts of Obsession | Officer Parker | TV movie |
| 1996 | Caroline in the City | Pauly Brown | Episode: "Caroline and the Gift" |
| 1997 | High Tide | Unknown | Episode: "Dead Men Don't Snore" |
| 1998 | Mike Hammer, Private Eye | Angel Grammatico | Episode: "Lucky in Love" |
| 1999 | Vengeance Unlimited | Michael Sanricci | Episode: "Judgment" |
| 1999 | Air America | Unknown | Episode: "Catch-23" |
| 1999 | Star Trek: Deep Space Nine | Frankie 'Frankie Eyes' | Episode: "Badda-Bing, Badda-Bang" |
| 1999 | Lansky | Vito Genovese | TV movie |
| 1999 | L.A. Heat | Alfredo Matessa | 2 episodes |
| 1999 | Acapulco H.E.A.T. | Tully Sims | Episode: "Code Name: The Stolen Leg" |
| 1999 | Early Edition | Mr. Escobar | Episode: "Take Me Out to the Ballgame" |
| 1999 | Ryan Caulfield: Year One | Unknown | Episode: "A Night at the Gashole" |
| 2000 | Walker, Texas Ranger | Clint Redman | 2 episodes |
| 2002 | The Shield | Eddie Crosby | Episode: "Blowback" |
| 2002 | The Jersey | Unknown | Episode: "It's a Mad Mad Mad Mad Jersey" |
| 2004 | Skeleton Man | Blind Indian | TV movie |
| 2004 | The Young and the Restless | Bertolli Lewis | 4 episodes |
| 2005 | Larva | Sheriff Lester | TV movie |
| 2012 | Low Lifes | Don | TV movie |
| 2014 | Charlie Murphy's Law | Mr. Phelps | Episode: "Reunions" |
| 2014 | The Sparrows | Gus Sparrow | Episode: "Trailer" |
| 2017 | Sangre Negra | Vincent Sabatini | 2 episodes |
| 2017 | Broken Dreams Blvd | Abe Zemmle | TV movie |
| 2017 | A Venice Tale | Bartender Dad | TV movie |
| 2019 | What/If | Mr. Willis | 2 episodes |

Video games
| Year | Title | Role |
|---|---|---|
| 1992 | It Came from the Desert | Sheriff (voice) |
| 1995 | Phantasmagoria | Zoltan 'Carno' Carnovasch |
| 1996 | Eraser - Turnabout | File Clerk |
