= Dorothea Puente =

American serial killer (1929–2011)

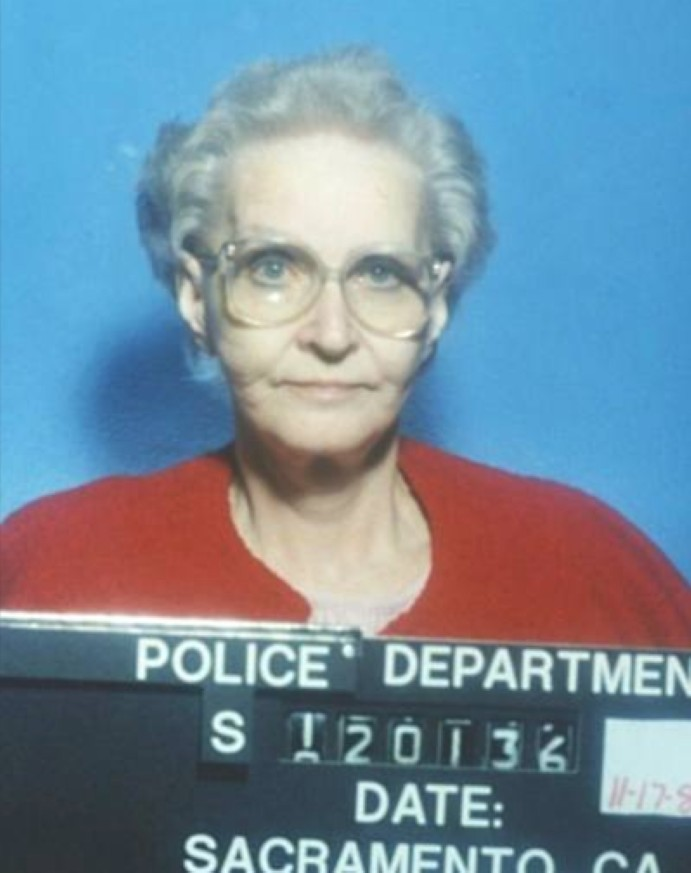
- Puente's mugshot on November 17, 1988
- Born: Dorothea Helen Gray; January 9, 1929; Redlands, California, U.S.
- Died: March 27, 2011 (aged 82); Central California Women's Facility, Chowchilla, California, U.S.
- Other names: "Death House Landlady"; Teya Singoalla Neyaarda; Sharon Johansson
- Convictions: First-degree murder with special circumstances (2 counts); Second-degree murder
- Penalty: Life imprisonment without the possibility of parole

Details
- Victims: 9 (convicted of 3)
- Span of crimes: 1948–1988
- Country: United States
- State: California
- Date apprehended: November 16, 1988

Dorothea Helen Puente (née Gray; January 9, 1929 – March 27, 2011), also known as the Killer Landlady or the Death House Landlady, was an American serial killer and financial fraudster who murdered various tenants of the boarding house she ran in Sacramento, California, between 1982 and 1988.

Posing as a landlady, Puente procured various elderly and mentally disabled people to stay at the boarding house she ran. Beginning in 1982, she began killing her tenants, typically by poisoning, before burying their bodies around the residence and then cashing their Social Security checks. Puente was arrested on November 16, 1988, after authorities uncovered the bodies during the investigation into the disappearance of one of her victims.

Puente was tried on nine first-degree murder charges in 1993, but she was only convicted of three as the jury deadlocked on the six other counts. She was sentenced to life imprisonment without parole on December 10, 1993, and was imprisoned at Central California Women's Facility until her death in 2011.

== Background ==
Dorothea Helen Gray was born on January 9, 1929, in Redlands, California, to Trudy Mae (née Yates) and Jesse James Gray. Both parents were alcoholics. Puente's father repeatedly threatened to kill himself, holding a gun to his head in front of his children. (Reports vary of whether Dorothea had 6 or 7 siblings.) He died of tuberculosis in 1937. Her mother, who worked as a sex worker, lost custody of her children in 1938 and died in a motorcycle accident by the end of the year. Dorothea and her siblings were subsequently sent to an orphanage, where she was sexually abused.

In 1945, 16-year-old Puente married her first husband, Fred McFaul, a soldier who had just returned from the Pacific theater of World War II. They had two daughters between 1946 and 1948; Puente sent one to live with relatives in Sacramento, and placed the other for adoption. She also suffered a miscarriage.

In the spring of 1948, Dorothea was arrested for purchasing women's accessories using forged checks in Riverside. She pled guilty to two counts of forgery, serving four months in jail and three years' probation. Six months after her release, she left Riverside. Later that year, her first husband left her.

In 1952, she allegedly married merchant seaman Axel Bren Johansson in San Francisco. She created a fake persona, calling herself Teya Singoalla Neyaarda, a Muslim woman of Egyptian and Israeli descent. They had a turbulent marriage; Puente took advantage of Johansson's frequent trips to sea by inviting men to their home and gambling away his money.

She was arrested in 1960 for owning and operating a bookkeeping firm as a front for a brothel in Sacramento; she was found guilty and was sentenced to ninety days in the Sacramento County Jail. In 1961, Johansson had her briefly committed to DeWitt State Hospital after a binge of drinking, lying, criminal behavior, and suicide attempts. While there, she was diagnosed by doctors as a pathological liar with an unstable personality.

Dorothea and Johansson divorced in 1966, although she continued to use Johansson's surname afterwards. Holding her identity, she assumed the name Sharon Johansson and portrayed herself as a devout Christian. She established her reputation as a caregiver, providing young women with a sanctuary from poverty and abuse without charge.

In 1968, Dorothea married Roberto Jose Puente. After sixteen months, the couple separated, with Dorothea citing domestic abuse. She attempted to serve him with a divorce petition, but he fled to Mexico; the divorce was not finalized until 1973. The two continued to have a turbulent relationship, and Dorothea filed a restraining order in 1975. She continued to use the surname Puente for over 20 years.

Following her divorce, Puente focused on running a boarding house near 15th and F Streets in Sacramento. She established herself as a genuine resource to the community to aid alcoholics, homeless people, and the mentally ill by holding Alcoholics Anonymous meetings and assisting individuals to sign up to receive Social Security benefits. She created her public image of a respectable older matron by wearing vintage clothing and large glasses, and not dyeing her greying hair. She established herself as a respected member of the local Hispanic community, funding charities, scholarships and radio programs. She eventually met and married Pedro Angel Montalvo, though Montalvo abruptly left the relationship a week after their marriage.

On December 21, 1978, Puente was convicted of illegally cashing 34 state and federal checks that belonged to her tenants. She was given five years' probation and ordered to pay $4,000 in restitution.

== Victims ==
On January 16, 1982, Puente met Malcolm McKenzie, age 74, in a bar and accompanied him back to his apartment. He later reported that Puente had drugged him by slipping something into his drink before she robbed him of a coin collection, watches and other jewelry, including a diamond ring belonging to his mother, which she removed from his finger while he was incapacitated.

On April 28, 1982, Ruth Munroe, age 61, who had visited Puente's home two weeks prior, was found dead due to respiratory depression, caused by a massive overdose of codeine. Munroe was reportedly in good health when she arrived at Puente's home; however, by April 25, she told a friend, "I am so sick I feel like I am going to die." Munroe's death was originally ruled an "undetermined overdose," but later classified as a homicide.

On May 16, 1982, Dorothy Osborne, age 49, found checks, credit cards, and other items missing eight hours after Puente visited her home and prepared her a drink. This resulted in Puente being convicted of three grand theft charges. She was sentenced to five years in prison, state parole until March 21, 1986, and her federal parole sentence was extended another two years, until 1990.

During her incarceration, she began corresponding with Everson Theodore Gillmouth, a 77-year-old retiree from Oregon. At the beginning of September in 1985, Gillmouth arrived at Puente's boarding house with his truck and trailer. On September 9, 1985, after serving only half her sentence, Puente was released from prison, whereupon she was picked up by Gillmouth and Ricardo Ordorica, a close friend who lived with his family in the downstairs flat at 1426 F Street. In October 1985, Puente wrote to Gillmouth's sister informing her that she and Gillmouth were to be married on November 2. A short time later, Puente hired a handyman, Ismael Carrasco Florez, to remodel some of her house. She asked him to build a 6-foot by 30-inch by 30-inch storage box. She agreed to give him Gillmouth's truck and $800 as payment. The day after Florez completed the box, he noticed it had been nailed shut. Puente asked Florez to help her move the box, which now weighed approximately 300 lb (140 kg), to a storage location, but she decided to leave it near a river about an hour's drive from Sacramento. On January 1, 1986, a fisherman discovered the suspicious-looking box along the Sacramento River and notified authorities. A severely decomposed human body was found inside the box, wrapped in several plastic bags and covered with a bed sheet secured by electrical tape; mothballs and toilet deodorizer were also placed in the box. The body was not positively identified as Gillmouth's until over two years later, on December 28, 1988. It was later discovered that after Gillmouth's death, Puente had mailed forged letters and cards to his sister in an attempt to make her believe Gillmouth was still alive. Puente was also found to have forged Gillmouth's signature on his truck's certificate of title, and she continued cashing Gillmouth's benefit checks until July, 1986.

In the fall of 1986, Betty Mae Palmer, age 78, arrived at Puente's boarding house. On October 14, 1986, Puente obtained a California ID card with her photo and Palmer's name. Two months later, the mailing address on Palmer's social security checks was changed to Puente's address. Puente forged Palmer's signature and cashed nearly $7,000 worth of benefit checks belonging to Palmer. In November 1988, the partially dismembered body of a woman was discovered in a shallow hole in Puente's front yard. The head, hands, and lower legs were never found. Toxicology reports of the body revealed the presence of doxylamine, an over-the-counter antihistamine, as well as haloperidol and flurazepam, both of which were previously prescribed to Palmer. The body was identified as Palmer's on January 24, 1989, through comparison to previous medical X-rays.

On October 21, 1986, Puente summoned a notary to the hospital room of Leona Carpenter, 78, who had suffered a flurazepam overdose. She was given power of attorney over Carpenter and began cashing her social security checks just ten days later. In December, after Carpenter was released from the hospital, she went to live with Puente. Once again, Carpenter returned to the hospital, and just a few weeks after she was discharged, in February 1987, she disappeared. In November 1988, her body was found in the southeastern corner of Puente's yard. Toxicology reports of Carpenter's brain tissue revealed the presence of codeine, diazepam, and flurazepam.

In February 1987, James Gallop, 62, moved into Puente's home. On July 20, 1987, a potentially malignant tumor was found in Gallop's colon. He agreed to further testing, but Puente later contacted his doctor's office, notifying them that he had gone to Los Angeles indefinitely. Gallop's body was discovered buried under a gazebo in Puente's yard in November, 1988. Toxicological testing of Gallop's brain and liver revealed the presence of amitriptyline, nortriptyline, phenytoin, and flurazepam.

In July 1987, Eugene Gamel, 58, was found dead of an apparent suicide, having overdosed on amitriptyline and ethanol. Puente, who was Gamel's landlady, said he had a history of suicide attempts. Though Puente was never charged with Gamel's murder, he was considered a possible victim.

On October 2, 1987, Vera Faye Martin, age 61, was sent to live with Puente. Beginning on October 5, 1987, Puente forged a number of Martin's social security checks, totalling over $7,000. On October 19, 1987, Martin failed to contact her daughter on her birthday, as she had done each year. In November 1988, Martin's body was found buried under a metal shed in Puente's yard. Toxicology reports of her brain and liver revealed flurazepam.

On October 21, 1987, Dorothy Miller, age 65, was placed in an upstairs flat in Puente's home. She introduced Miller to Ricardo Ordorica, who the following November became the representative payee for Miller's social security benefits. Just weeks after her arrival, Miller disappeared, and on November 20, 1987, Puente hired a carpet cleaner to remove a large "pile of foul smelling slime" in Miller's room. Puente continued to forge Miller's checks, totalling over $11,000, after she was no longer at her house. Miller's remains were later discovered buried under a slab of concrete, near some rose bushes. Tissue samples from Miller's brain revealed the presence of carbamazepine and flurazepam.

On November 29, 1987, Brenda Trujillo sent a letter to the Social Security office in Sacramento, accusing Puente of stealing her Social Security checks, totalling $3,500. Trujillo had met Puente in the Sacramento County Jail in 1982, and the two had later been cellmates. After Trujillo's release, she had moved into Puente's boarding house, where Puente had helped her apply for Social Security benefits. Trujillo claimed that Puente had drugged her and called her parole officer, resulting in her parole being revoked, this preventing her from receiving the checks.

In February 1988, Alvaro "Bert" Gonzales Montoya, age 51, arrived at Puente's home. In March, an application was filed, designating Puente as the payee of Montoya's benefits. At the end of August, a roommate saw a man removing Montoya's clothes from a closet. Montoya was last seen on August 24 and missed an appointment on August 29. Puente told several people that Montoya had gone to Mexico to visit his relatives. Social workers continued to attempt to contact Montoya in September and October to no avail. In November, Puente asked Donald Anthony, a former convict who had been working in her yard, to contact the social worker, pretending to be Montoya's brother-in-law. He agreed. Calling himself Michel Obergone, he told the social worker he had transported Montoya from the F Street house to Utah. The social worker, suspicious, told Puente that she was going to call the police. On November 10, the social worker received a letter, purportedly from Michel Obergone, wrapped in a paper towel to avoid fingerprints. Days later, Montoya's body was found buried adjacent to Carpenter's. Toxicology testing revealed the presence of loxapine, flurazepam, diphenhydramine, amitriptyline, and carbamazepine. Montoya had prescriptions for all of the drugs except for carbamazepine.

On March 9, 1988, Benjamin Fink, age 55, was sent to live with Puente. Fink's brother visited him on a weekly basis, for six weeks. By the end of April, Fink was gone. Another tenant reported smelling a foul odor emanating from his room, but was told by Puente that it was a sewer backup. On April 29, Puente received 12 bags of cement. That June, next to the door of the metal shed, she had a hole dug, which was later filled in with concrete. In November, Fink's body was discovered in this area, wrapped in a plastic knotted bedspread, secured with duct tape, and covered with blue absorbent pads. His toxicology report revealed the presence of amitriptyline, loxapine, and flurazepam.

== Arrest ==
On November 7, 1988, police spoke with John Sharp, a former resident, about the disappearance of Montoya. Initially, Sharp told police that he had seen Montoya two days earlier, but then he slipped a note to the officer that said, "She wants me to lie to you." He later met with an officer to tell his story. On November 11, 1988, a detective returned to Puente's residence and, with her permission, began digging in areas that appeared to be recently disturbed. Thirty minutes later, he discovered the first body there. Just hours afterward, Puente slipped away from police. On November 13, 1988, an all-points bulletin was issued for her.

On November 16, 1988, Charles Willgues, along with Gene Silver of CBS, alerted police to Puente's whereabouts at a motel in Los Angeles. Willgues met Puente, who was using the alias Donna Johansen, the day before at a nearby bar. He later recalled seeing her on a CBS morning newscast and reached out to Gene Silver, who met with Willgues at his apartment. The two contacted local law enforcement, and Puente was arrested the same day.

== Trial and conviction ==
On November 17, 1988, Puente was flown from the Burbank–Glendale–Pasadena Airport to Sacramento, escorted by police, and booked in the county jail. She was then formally charged with the murder of Montoya.

On March 10, 1989, criminal charges against Ismael Florez were dismissed because the statute of limitations had expired three years after Gillmouth's body was discovered. Florez was later granted immunity for his testimony against Puente.

On March 31, 1989, an amended complaint was filed, charging Puente with nine counts of murder, with special circumstance, qualifying it as a death penalty case. According to investigators, most of her victims had been drugged until they overdosed; Puente had then wrapped them in bed-sheets and plastic lining before dragging them to open pits in the backyard for burial. By May 24, 1990, the prosecutor rested his case for the preliminary hearing to determine whether the case could proceed to trial, having called 71 witnesses and introducing 108 exhibits. On June 19, 1990, a judge ruled that there was "ample circumstantial evidence" to send Puente to trial, and on July 31, 1990, Puente pleaded not guilty.

After numerous delays, on October 19, 1992, a judge ruled that Puente would face all nine murder counts, and that all cases would be heard in Monterey County. On December 21, 1992, twelve jurors, consisting of eight men and four women, were selected for Puente's trial. The following month, six alternate jurors, five women and one man, were selected to back up the twelve regular jurors.

Puente on trial in 1993

Puente's trial began on February 9, 1993. By the conclusion of the trial, 156 witnesses testified, more than 3,100 exhibits had been submitted, and over 22,000 pages of transcript were recorded. After deliberating for eleven days, the jury told Judge Michael J. Virga on August 2, 1993, that they were deadlocked on all nine counts of murder and asked for further instruction. The next day, Virga ordered the jury to resume their efforts to break the deadlock. On August 26, 1993, Puente was convicted on three counts of murder: Benjamin Fink, Leona Carpenter, and Dorothy Miller. The jury, after deliberating for 35 days, remained deadlocked on six cases: Ruth Munroe, Everson Theodore Gillmouth, Betty Mae Palmer, James Gallop, Vera Faye Martin, and Alvaro Gonzales Montoya.

During the penalty phase of the trial, jurors found themselves deadlocked once again, and on October 13, 1993, Puente was spared the death penalty. On December 10, 1993, she was sentenced to life imprisonment without the possibility of parole. She was incarcerated at Central California Women's Facility (CCWF) in Chowchilla, California.

On August 28, 1997, an appellate court in San Jose, California, affirmed Puente's murder convictions, but ordered an examination of juror misconduct allegations. After a three-day hearing, on September 25, 1998, Judge William D. Curtis rejected each allegation of jury misconduct in Puente's trial.

== Death ==
Puente died in prison at Chowchilla on March 27, 2011, from natural causes; she was 82 years old.

== Media ==
Puente has been featured on numerous true crime television shows, including Crime Stories, Deadly Women, A Stranger in My Home, World's Most Evil Killers, and Worst Roommate Ever.

In 1998, Puente began corresponding with Shane Bugbee. The result was Cooking with a Serial Killer (2004), which included a lengthy interview, almost fifty recipes, and various pieces of prison art sent to Bugbee by the convicted murderer. Jodi Picoult mentions Puente's crimes and cookbook in her novel House Rules.

The boarding house at 1426 F Street in Sacramento was included in the 2013 home tour held by the Sacramento Old City Association. It was then the subject of the 2015 documentary short The House Is Innocent and was again opened to tours for one day in conjunction with a local film festival's showing of the film.

Dorothea, a biopic written and directed by Chad Ferrin, was released on November 4, 2025, with Susan Priver playing Puente.

== See also ==
- List of serial killers in the United States
- List of serial killers by number of victims
