= Frightmare (1981 film) =

- Theatrical release poster
- Directed by: Norman Thaddeus Vane
- Written by: Norman Thaddeus Vane
- Produced by: Henry Gellis; Hedayat Javid; Callie Wright; Patrick M. Wright
- Starring: Ferdy Mayne; Luca Bercovici; Jennifer Starrett; Nita Talbot; Barbara Pilavin
- Cinematography: Joel King
- Edited by: Doug Jackson
- Music by: Jerry Mosely
- Production company: Screenwriters Production Co.
- Distributed by: Saturn International
- Release date: September 9, 1981 (UK)
- Running time: 86 minutes
- Country: United States
- Language: English
- Budget: $120,000

Frightmare (originally known as The Horror Star, and also known as simply Horror Star) is a 1981 American supernatural slasher film written and directed by Norman Thaddeus Vane. It stars Ferdy Mayne, Luca Bercovici, Jennifer Starrett, Nita Talbot and Barbara Pilavin, along with Jeffrey Combs in his horror film acting debut. The film's plot follows a group of drama students who decide to kidnap the corpse of a recently deceased horror movie star. By disrupting his tomb, they unwittingly release an ancient black magic that begins consuming them one by one.

The film was distributed by Saturn International, and has been released on home media by Troma Entertainment and Vinegar Syndrome, among other companies.

== Plot ==
A group of drama students idolize their favorite horror film star, Conrad Ragzoff. In the beginning, Conrad is acting in a commercial for dentures, and the director stops the filming because he does not like Conrad's performance. While the director sits on the edge of the balcony, an angry Conrad pushes him off with his cane. Later, Conrad visits a school and talks about his performances, only to faint under excitement. One of the drama students, Meg, revives him. Later, as Conrad sits in his bed, his obese director Wolfgang visits him. After a long talk about his death arrangements, Conrad closes his eyes and tricks the director into believing he is dead. Then, the director denounces him until Conrad springs up and smothers him with a pillow. After Conrad dies, the seven drama students, Meg, Saint, Bobo, Eve, Donna, Oscar, and Stu, go to the cemetery after dark, they sneak into the tomb where Conrad's coffin resides. The lights turn on and they see a film of Conrad stating that he welcomes them into his tomb, unless, he says, they have broken in. Creeped out, Meg asks them not to take Conrad, but they do, and take him to an old mansion where they stay for the night.

That night, Conrad's coffin explodes, and he rises from the dead. Later, Oscar and Donna are having sex but Donna says she is scared. Oscar goes to investigate and has his tongue ripped out by Conrad in the attic. Donna becomes worried and walks outside only to see Conrad, who uses black magic to set her on fire. Later, the five remaining teens realize that Oscar and Donna are missing and begin to look for them. Bobo however is put in a trance by Conrad and walks to Conrad's tomb, only to suffocate from vapors that are released inside the crypt. Eve decides to watch a movie and is lured out of her room by the sound of Donna's voice, only to be smashed into the wall by Conrad's coffin, and hidden with Oscar's body.

Meg, Saint, and Stu realize that the other two are now missing and begin to panic, and Meg decides she's going to tell the police. Stu runs upstairs to get a flashlight since Saint's car will not start, only to be decapitated by Conrad who then sends his severed head out onto the front lawn of the mansion. Meg and Saint venture outside looking for Stu and find Donna's burnt body, and hurry back inside. Saint decides to try to fix his car, while Conrad traps Meg in the attic, where she impales him with a cross. Saint safely hides her unconscious body and takes Conrad's body with him to put back in the crypt, while the police arrive to the mansion finding a delirious Meg and all her dead friends. At the cemetery, Conrad attacks Saint and puts him in the crematorium, and goes back to his grave. A while later, his wife and his psychic friend arrive to say their final goodbyes to the "dead" Conrad, only Conrad kills his psychic after she steals his jewelry from his body, and his wife locks the crypt for forever. The final scene shows a video being played on the television installed in the crypt of Conrad informing the audience that hell is actually quite pleasant and hopes that more respect will be shown for the dead.

== Cast ==
- Ferdy Mayne as Conrad Ragzoff (credited as Ferdinand Mayne)
- Luca Bercovici as Saint
- Nita Talbot as Mrs. Rohmer
- Leon Askin as Wolfgang
- Jennifer Starrett as Meg
- Barbara Pilavin as Etta Radzoff
- Alan Stock as Oscar
- Carlene Olson as Eve
- Scott Thomson as Bobo
- Donna McDaniel as Donna
- Jeffrey Combs as Stu
- Peter Kastner as Commercial Director
- Stann Findelle as Assistant Director

== Production ==
Some of the horror movie memorabilia seen in the film was provided by Forrest J Ackerman.

== Release ==
Several sources list the film's release year as 1981, including home video distributor Vinegar Syndrome. Other sources list the release year as 1982, and still others list it as 1983.

== Critical reception ==
A contemporary review in Variety called Frightmare a "misguided horror spoof." Bill Gibron of DVD Talk referred to it as "a monotonous mess, made even less memorable by its lack of anything closely resembling a movie – like characters, plot or purpose." He concluded that the film is "far too slow and somber for a modern macabre audience, and its supposedly ingenious premise pales in comparison to those that would later really fidget with the scary movie dynamic." However, in his book The Essential Monster Movie Guide, writer Stephen Jones called the film an "enjoyable low-budget horror thriller." Meagan Navarro of Bloody Disgusting wrote that the film "has some pretty great death sequences", and called it "'80s slashers meets Gothic horror, but full on weird."

== Home media ==
Frightmare was released on VHS by Vestron Video. In May 2005, it was released on DVD by Troma Entertainment. On October 20, 2015, the film was released on DVD and Blu-ray by Vinegar Syndrome and later by UK distributors 88 Films.
