= Robert Steven Rhine =

American actor and writer

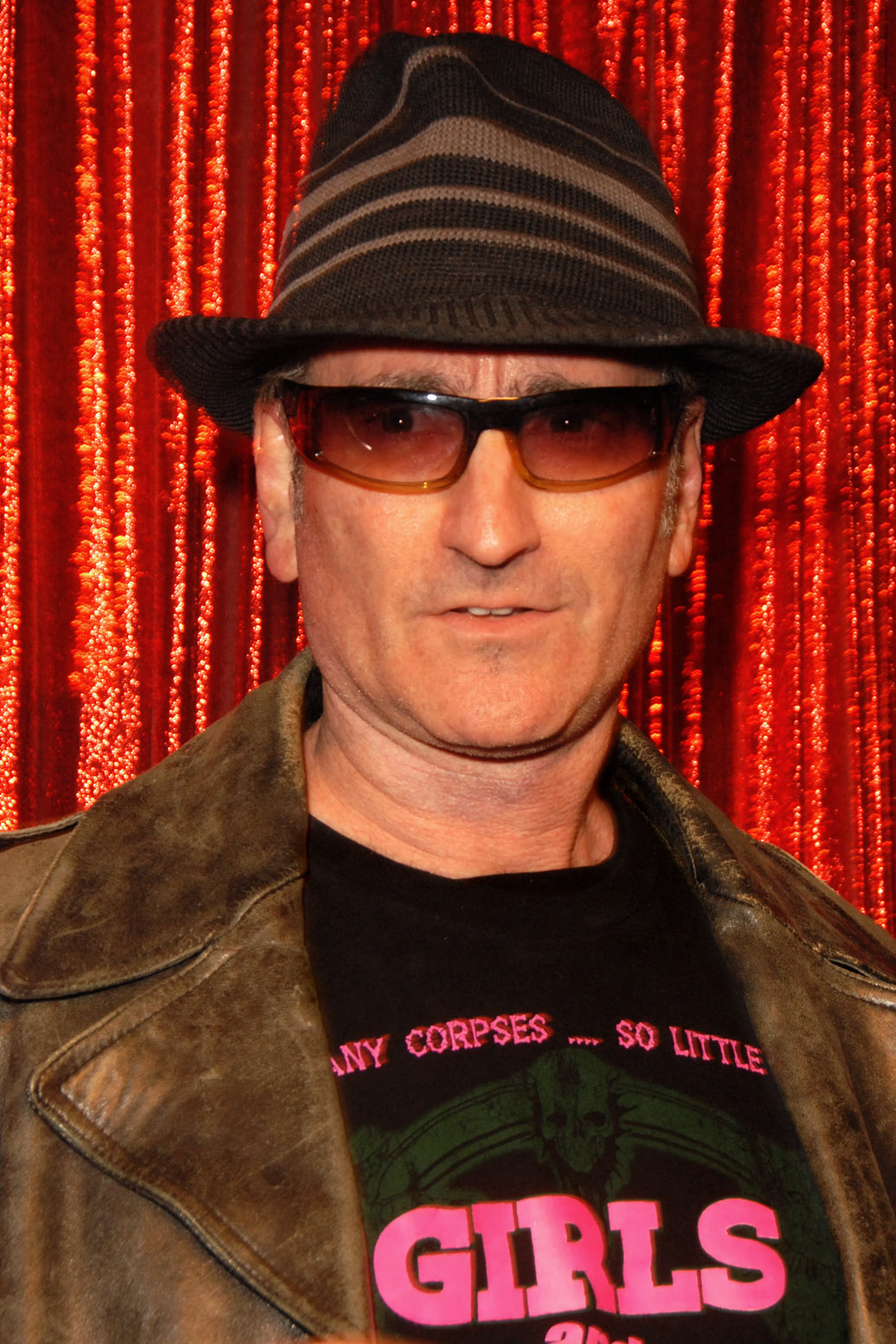
- Rhine on April 4, 2010.
- Other name: Corpsy
- Occupations: Writer, actor
- Website: Official website

Robert Steven Rhine, also known by his pen name Corpsy, is an American writer and actor. Rhine is the founder, publisher, and "Deaditor-in-Chief" of the horror-comedy magazine Girls and Corpses.

== Biography ==
He is the son of Larry Rhine.

=== Acting ===
Rhine has appeared in over a two dozen plays (including two L.A. premieres), television, features, print, and commercials. Rhine also portrayed Rod Serling for director Joe Dante's "The Twilight Zone Tower of Terror" ride at Disney's Hollywood Studios. Coincidentally, Rhine met Rod Serling, who was an acquaintance of his family, several times when he was ten years old. In 2019 Rhine starred in Exorcism at 60,000 Feet, also serving as a scriptwriter and producer.
