= Cassandra Gava =

American actress and producer

- Born: Cassandra Gaviola
- Occupation: Actress
- Years active: 1963–present

Cassandra Gava (Cassandra Gaviola) is an American actress and producer. Gava is best known for her performance as the witch in the 1982 film Conan the Barbarian, and as the slave woman Alessa in High Road to China. She appeared in 21 films between 1979 and 1998. She also appears on the cover of the 1976 Jefferson Starship album Spitfire, and is credited as "dragon princess" in the liner notes. Gava appeared in the television series Trapper John, M.D. as O'Malley in 1980 and in Taxi as Desiree in the 1981 episode "Vienna Waits".

== Theater ==
In the 1970s for theater as well in films in the 1980s, Gava was billed in the credits as Cassandra Gaviola. In 1973, she was Coda in the one-act play Coda in the 1973 production which was produced by East West Players. In the following year, she was the character Jane Larry, the future wife of the main character, in the East West Players production of In the Jungle of the Cities by Bertolt Brecht.

== Partial filmography ==
- Conan the Barbarian (1982) -- The Wolf Witch (as Cassandra Gaviola)
- Night Shift (1982) -- J.J.
- The Black Room (1982) -- Bridget (as Cassandra Gaviola)
- High Road to China (1983) -- Alessa
- Straight Up (1988) -- Cocaine
- The Game (1988) -- Dawn
- Dead By Dawn (1988)
- Mortal Passions (1989) -- Cinda
- The Amityville Curse (video) (1990) -- Abigail
- Last Man Standing (1996) -- Barmaid
- Mysteria (2011) -- Rose
- Dorothea (2025) -- Charleston
- Ed Kemper American Serial Killer (2025) - as Maude Kemper
