= Club Life (1986 film) =

- Directed by: Norman Thaddeus Vane
- Written by: Norman Thaddeus Vane
- Story by: Norman Thaddeus Vane; Bleu Mckenzie
- Produced by: Norman Thaddeus Vane
- Starring: Tom Parsekian; Michael Parks; Jamie Barrett; Tony Curtis; Dee Wallace
- Cinematography: Dennon Rawles
- Edited by: David Kern
- Music by: Jack Conrad
- Production companies: Cineworld Enterprises Corp; Tiger Productions
- Distributed by: Troma Entertainment
- Release date: February 28, 1986 (Los Angeles)
- Running time: 92 minutes
- Country: United States
- Language: English

Club Life is a 1986 American action thriller drama film directed by Norman Thaddeus Vane and starring Tom Parsekian, Michael Parks, Jamie Barrett, Tony Curtis and Dee Wallace.

== Cast ==
- Tom Parsekian as Cal
- Michael Parks as Tank
- Jamie Barrett as Sissy
- Tony Curtis as Hector
- Dee Wallace as Tilly
- Ron Kuhlman as The Doctor
- Pat Ast as Butch
- Bruce Reed as First Punk
- Kristine DeBell as Fern

== Release ==
The film was released theatrically in New York City on April 3, 1987.

== Reception ==
Kevin Thomas of the Los Angeles Times gave the film a positive review and wrote that it "manages to bring freshness and warmth to the oft-told tale of youthful innocents adrift in Bad Old Hollywood."

Janet Maslin of The New York Times gave the film a negative review and wrote, "The film is too loud and busy to establish this in terms of character or conversation, so it concentrates strictly on the visual set, which is garish but attention-getting. The acting consists mostly of unfocused posturing, in a succession of scenes that could easily have been rearranged without losing any of their dramatic focus. Only Mr. Curtis is any better than the material, with a world-weary gravity that seems, in this context, like the last word in maturity."
