= Giancarlo Judica Cordiglia =

Italian actor and entertainer

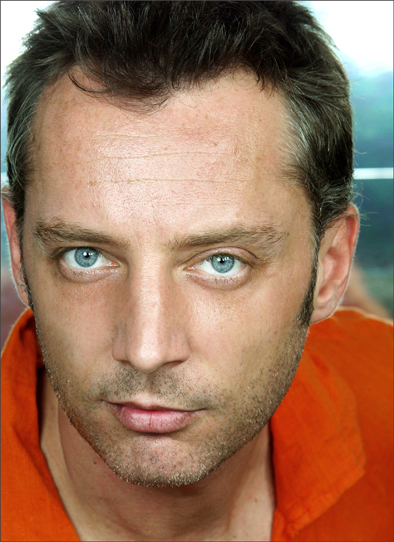
- Born: Giancarlo Judica Cordiglia; 30 September 1971 (age 54); San Maurizio Canavese, Italy
- Occupations: Character actor, comedian

Giancarlo Judica Cordiglia (born 30 September 1971) is an Italian actor and entertainer perhaps best known for his role in the television program Melevisione on Raitre (as Gnomo Ronfo) and his roles in RIS Delitti Imperfetti (as Capt. Bruno Corsini) films on Canale 5.
