= Al Burke =

American professional wrestler

Personal information
- Born: February 13, 1954 (age 72) United States

Professional wrestling career
- Ring name(s): Al Burke; Dr. Feelgood; Mr. Outrageous
- Billed height: 6 ft 0 in (183 cm)
- Billed weight: 240 lb (109 kg)
- Debut: 1980s
- Retired: 2019

Allen Burke (born September 25, 1954) is an American professional wrestler and actor. He worked for the World Wrestling Federation and Universal Wrestling Federation in the late 1980s and early 1990s.

== Professional wrestling career ==
Burke got into professional wrestling after he and his friends met Hulk Hogan in the early 1980s. Hogan influenced Burke and his friends into wrestling.

In 1988, Burke made his debut in the World Wrestling Federation as a jobber. He competed against Jim Duggan, Jake Roberts, André the Giant, Ultimate Warrior, Bret Hart, Shawn Michaels, Dusty Rhodes, Legion of Doom, and Bob Backlund. Burke left the WWF in 1993.

After the WWF, Burke worked for Herb Abrams's Universal Wrestling Federation in 1993 and 1994 as Dr. Feelgood. He appeared on UWF Blackjack Brawl with Missy Hyatt as his valet against Sunny Beach for the vacant SportsChannel Television Championship. Near the end of the match, Feelgood pulled a rag out of his medical bag with black ink poured on it and then tried to shove the rag into Beach, but Beach countered by shoving the rag into Feelgood's face and pinning him to win the SportsChannel Television Championship. Hyatt slapped Beach after the match, allowing Feelgood to attack him with the rag from behind. After UWF had folded, Burke retired from wrestling and went into acting.

On May 26, 2019, Burke returned to wrestling for one match, defeating Israeli wrestler Tomer Shalom by disqualification for CWO Maynia in Toronto, Ontario.

Burke is currently a member of the Cauliflower Alley Club. He won the 2023 REEL Award.

== Acting career ==
Burke became an actor when he got an offer to play a bad guy role in the film Atomic Blue: Mexican Wrestler. His most well known role is the "Large Billy Idol Fan" in the Adam Sandler movie The Wedding Singer. Has appeared in many television series such Star Trek Enterprise, All That, Mad About You, Getting Away with Murder, and others. He has also appeared in commercials and music videos.

== Championships and accomplishments ==
- Cauliflower Alley Club
  - REEL Award (2023)
- International Wrestling Alliance
  - IWA Heavyweight Championship (2 times)

== Filmography ==
=== Acting ===
Film appearances
Year	Title	Role	Notes	Ref.
1998	The Wedding Singer	Billy Idol's Biggest Fan		
1999	Atomic Blue Mexican Wrestler	Tex	Also stunt performer	
2000	Little Heroes 2	Inmate	Uncredited; Also stunt performer	
2002	High Crimes	Biker	Uncredited	
2002	The Circuit 2	Fighter		
2003	13 Dead Men	Psyco	Also stunt performer	
2003	Unknown Caller	Unknown Caller	Short film Also stunt coordinator and performer	
2004	Blood Gnome	Cop #1		
2005	Sharkskin 6	Car Cop		
2005	Another Man's Treasure	Hobbes	Short film	
2005	Pit Fighter	Mob Boss	Uncredited; Also stunt performer	
2006	The Script	Police Sergeant	Short film	
2006	Heart of Fear	Lead Sergeant		
2006	Werewolf in a Women's Prison	Badger	Also stunt coordinator	
2007	Naughty or Nice	Santa	Short film Also stunt performer	
2007	Brobot	Cop	Short film	
2007	It's Christmas	Officer Williams		
2008	Magus	Python	Also stunt coordinator and performer	
2008	The Trek	Sgt. Schulman	Also stunt driver and performer	
2009	Knock 'Em Dead, Kid	The Cop	Also stunt performer	
2009	World Full of Nothing	Cop in Hamilton		
2009	A Second Chance	Officer O'Brien	Short film Also stunt coordinator and performer	
2009	Awaken	Motorcycle Cop	Short film	
2009	Safe House	Police Sgt.	Also stunt performer	
2010	Bio Slime	Land Lord	Also stunt coordinator	
2010	The Gruesome Death of Tommy Pistol	Arnold Schwarzenegger		
2010	Killjoy 3	Punchy the Hobo Clown / Cop	Also fight choreographer and stunt coordinator	
2010	A Dirty Job	Cop	Short film	
2011	L.A. Paranormal	LAPD Sergeant		
2011	The Curse of the Apple	Officer Tom	Short film Also stunt driver	
2011	Naked Run	Motor Officer	Also stunt driver	
2011	McGruder and the Loch Ness Bone	Sgt. O'Brien		
2011	Roll Call	Seamus O'Malley	Also stunt coordinator and co-writer	
2011	Weird Tales 5: The Strange Case of Rhyolite Nevada	Police Chief Harry O'Brien		
2011	Hardcore Hearts	The Cop		
2011	40-Life	Police Officer		
2012	Choices	Bouncer	Short film Also stunt coordinator	
2012	Already Gone	Officer McGinty	Short film Also stunt performer and weapons handler	
2012	People Like Us	Outrageous Biker	Uncredited; Also stunt coordinator and performer	
2012	Killjoy Goes to Hell	Punchy	Also stunt coordinator and performer	
2012	The Five	Deputy John Connelly	Short film	
2012	Dust Up	Mr. Lizard	Also stunt driver and performer	
2013	Thirteen	Police Officer 5	Short film	
2013	Day of Redemption	Police Officer		
2013	The Dinosaur Experiment	Sheriff Morgan		
2013	Ambushed	LAPD Officer Lifor	Uncredited; Also stunt driver	
2013	Blood of Redemption	Officer Bauer	Uncredited	
2013	Dark Realm	Head of Security		
2013	Biggest Fan Music Video	Police Officer #2	Short film	
2013	Robin's Egg Blue	Police Officer	Short film	
2013	Richard, Dinner's Ready	The Sherriff	Short film	
2014	Hiccup	Officer Jonas	Short film	
2014	Puncture Wounds	Officer Jay Friday	Uncredited	
2014	Traces from the Past	Officer Clark	Short film	
2014	Gun Fu	Bad Outlaw	Short film	
2014	The Stoop Kids	Police Officer	Short film	
2014	7 Faces of Jack the Ripper	Sgt. Johnson		
2014	Remnant	CHP Officer		
2014	The Oatmeal Man	Officer Brown		
2014	The Burden	Police Officer	Short film	
2014	The Toy Soldiers	Male Police Officer		
2014	To Protect and Serve	Cop	Short film	
2014	The Baddest Part	Gas Station Attendant	Short film	
2014	Tumbleweed: A True Story	Officer O'Brien	Also stunt performer	
2015	Not in My Backyard	Sheriff O'Brian		
2015	Popcorn Ceiling	Officer Lee	Short film	
2015	Despair Sessions	Sgt. O'Brien		
2015	God of Thunder	Officer Richards		
2015	TheCavKid	Police Officer	Short film	
2015	Ol' School	Seamus O'Malley	Also stunt coordinator, driver and writer	
2015	King of Darkness	Mr. Jones	Also director	
2016	The 4th	Sargeant		
2016	Stavka na lyubov	Officer O'Brien		
2016	The Connected	Cop	Short film	
2016	Christmas Crime Story	Police Sergeant		
2016	Monster House	Biker Ghost	Short film	
2016	Trouble Man	Snyde, Officer	Short film	
2016	Killjoy's Psycho Circus	Punchy		
2016	Decades Apart	Officer Roake	Short film	
2016	Best Thanksgiving Ever	Officer D'Naleri		
2016	Meet the Wahls	Mr. Wahl	Short film	
2016	Radical			
2016	No Sunlight	Officer Clump		
2017	Robert Earl	Trooper	Short film	
2017	You Can't Have It	Detective Mosier	Uncredited	
2017	The Bang Bang Brokers	FBI Agent Callahan		
2017	Total Ape: MORE	Officer Burke	Short film	
2017	The KAOS Brief	Cop #1		
2017	Giantess Attack	Motor Officer	Also stunt performer	
2017	Torn	Officer Porter	Short film	
2017	Sun Dogs	Officer White	Also stunt driver	
2017	The Wrong Nanny	Police Sergeant	Uncredited	
2017	Dreams I Never Had	Baliff		
2017	Jack Suffer	Officer Burke		
2017	Stronghold	Big Chuck		
2017	Marco	Police Man		
2017	Cowboy	Deputy	Short film	
2017	Cops Are Actors	Police Sergeant	Short film	
2018	Bachelor Lions	Desk Sergeant		
2018	Frank Blue	CO O'Reily		
2018	A Friend's Obsession	Sgt. Hill		
2018	DWB: Dating While Black	Police Officer		
2018	The Big Break	LAPD Sergeant	Short film Also stunt driver	
2018	Sundown	Blind Sheriff	Short film	
2018	The Crossing	Captain O'Malley	Short film	
2018	Silent Panic	Police Officer		
2019	Counterpunch	Police Sergeant	Also stunt driver	
2019	Honey Boy	Biker	Uncredited	
2019	Bunker of Blood 07: Killjoys Carnage Caravan	Punchy		
2019	It Wants Blood!	Ralph Spector		
2019	Paint It Red	Police Motor Officer		
2019	Underdog	Officer Burke	Also stunt driver	
2019	Desperate Waters	Police Sergeant		
2019	Gam Cam Grrl	LAPD Cop #2		
2019	Intolerance: No More	Officer Al	Also stunt driver	
2019	Slice & Dice	Santa	Short film	
2019	Feast of Fear	Python	Also stunt coordinator and stunt double	
2020	Killer Waves 2	Punchy	Also stunt performer	
2020	Catch of the Day 2: You Die at Dawn!	Duncan Reinhold		
2020	Acts of Revenge	Sgt. O'Brien		
2020	Attack of the Unknown	Sergeant Burke		
2020	Paranormal Attraction	Officer Cooper		
2020	Break Even	Harbor Sheriff		
2021	The Junky Warrior	Sgt. Burke		
2021	Alien Danger! With Raven Van Slender	Mog The Meeker		
2021	Dutch	Sgt. Burke	Also stunt driver	
2021	Blind Ambivalence	Sargeant Burke	Short film Also stunt driver	
2021	Outsiders	Police Officer		
2021	Baby Money	Police Sergeant		
2021	Alien Danger 2! With Raven Van Slender	Mog The Meeker		
2021	The True Blue Ripper	Officer Burke		
2022	The Nudels of Nudeland	Officer D. Mann		
2022	The Princess Frog	Daddy Labouf		
2022	Lockdown	Officer Osborn	Also stunt performer	
2022	9 Ways to Hell	Officer Osbourne	Segment: "Wrath"	
2022	Dark Angels: The Demon Pit	Police Officer		
2022	Final X: The Final Experiment	Officer Crawford	Also stunt coordinator	
2023	Wages of Sin	Sgt. Burke	Post-production	
2023	Hell's Coming for You	Officer D. Mann	Post-production	
2023	Flycatcher	Sgt. Burke	Post-production; Also stunt driver	
TBA	Slice!	Todd Palmer	In production	
TBA	Clowny	Police Commander Burke	In production	
TBA	Hollywood Werewolf	Njal Good	Pre-production	
TBA	Hellvira's Haunted Asylum of Horror	Punchy / Mr. Nanners / Mr. Outrageous / Himself; Segment: "Hellvira's Haunted Asylum of Horror", "It's Hellvira Time!"	Pre-production	
TBA	The Lost Ship	Father	Pre-production	
TBA	Wicked Jack: Devil's Night	Bob	In Production	

Television appearances
Year	Title	Role	Notes	Ref.
1994	All That	Mr. Outrageous	2 episodes	
1997	Caillou	Cailette Singer	Episode: "Caillou Joins the Circus"	
1999	Mad About You	Herb Miller	Episode: "Separate Beds"	
2000	Above the Law	Chief Boobi	Episode: "Little Acts of Kindness"	
2001	The Bold and the Beautiful	Mover #1	2 episodes	
2002	The King of Queens	Butcher	Episode: "Holy Mackerel"; Uncredited	
2002	Robbery Homicide Division	Biker	Episode: "Wild Ride"	
2002-2003	Star Trek: Enterprise	Arctic Alien / Enolian Alien	2 episodes Uncredited	
2005	Untold Stories of the E.R.	Police Officer	Episode: "Comatose Man in Jail Cell"; Television documentary Also stunt driver	
2006	Where Did It Come From?		Episode: "Ancient Maya: Power Centers"; Also stunt performer Television documentary	
2007	Getting Away with Murder	Outrageous Bodyguard	Episode: "Enter Seth Silver"; Also stunt performer	
2007	Passions	Inmate #1	Episode: "June 19, 2007"	
2007	30 Days of Night: Dust to Dust	Jim Maguire	Episode: "Part 1"; Television miniseries	
2008	Crisis Point	Officer #2	Episode: "Pilot"	
2011	My Roommate the...	LAPD Officer	Episode: "Bank Robber"	
2012	The Eric Andre Show	Leather Daddy	Episode: "Ryan Phillippe"; Uncredited	
2012	The Screen Junkies Show	Police Officer	Episode: "Tips 2 Not Get Taken 2"	
2012	Cover Stories	Police Officer	Episode: "LMFAO: Sorry for Party Rocking"	
2013	Deadly Wives	Police Officer Samec	2 episodes Television documentary	
2013	BlackBoxTV	Police Officer	Episode: "Up to Here"	
2013	Prodigal Daughter	Anise's Dad	Television short	
2013-2014	Outrageous 911	Police Sergeant	2 episodes	
2013-2014	JustKiddingFilms	Male Cop / Bad Outlaw	2 episodes	
2014	Radio Disney Music Awards	Electrician	Television special	
2014	Balcony	Cop	Episode: "Cop"	
2014	Tattoo Nightmares	Motor Officer	2 episodes Also stunt driver	
2015	The Garry Haley Experience	LAPD Officer Quinn		
2015, 2020	David's Vlog	Sgt. Johnson	2 episodes Also stunt driver	
2015, 2020	L.A. Macabre	Police Sergeant / Sheriff Burke	2 episodes	
2016	El Vato	Officer Jameson	Episode: "El corrido de Chino Prison"	
2016	Dad Friends	Baliff	Television film	
2017	My Daughter Is Missing	Sgt. O'Brien	Television film	
2017	Murder Among Friends	Don Anthony	Episode: "Band of Brothers"; Television documentary	
2017	Nathan for You	Police Officer	Episode: "Shipping Logistics Company"; Television documentary	
2017	Blood Relatives	Officer Al	2 episodes Television documentary	
2017	Milagros de Navidad	Sgt. Burke	Episode: "Abriendo muros" Also stunt driver Television miniseries	
2017	Deadly Delusion	Police Sergeant	Television film	
2018	Spook Hunters	Sergeant Parker		
2018	Kevin Hart: What the Fit	LAPD Sgt. Burke	Episode: "Track & Field with James Van Der Beek"	
2018	Baby Obsession	Officer Burke	Television film	
2019	Deadly Recall	Sgt. Burke	Episode: "An Obsession"; Also stunt driver	
2019	The Coop	Sergeant Burke	Episode: "Who-Dun-It"	
2019	Criminal Confessions	Denver Police Sergeant	2 episodes Television documentary	
2019	Malvolia: The Queen of Screams	Santa	Episode: "Malvolia's Xmas Honor"	
2020	My Daughter's Been Kidnapped	Arresting Officer	Uncredited; Television film	
2021	20/20	Chris Camacho Jr.	Episode: "The Dating Game Killer"; Also stunt driver	
2021	American Cartel	Police Officer	2 episodes Television miniseries Also stunt driver	
2021	Jentzen Ramirez	Sgt. Burke	Episode: "Last to Get Arrested Wins $10,000"; Television miniseries	
2021	Wild West Chronicles	Wild man	Episode: "Bat Masterson & the Dodge City Dead Line"	
2021	Nova Vita	Officer Danvers	10 episodes	
2021	The Curse of Von Dutch: A Brand to Die For	Bailiff Morgan	Episode: "Von Douche"; Television miniseries	
2021	Fault	Police Sergeant		

Music videos appearances
Year	Title	Artist(s)	Role	Notes	Ref.
2000	"Disposable Teens"	Marilyn Manson	Riot Captain		
2000	"Original Prankster"	The Offspring	Mr. Outrageous		
2002	"Without Me"	Eminem	Himself	Uncredited	
2003	"Blowin' Me Up (With Her Love)"	JC Chasez	Biker		
2004	"Rumors"	Lindsay Lohan	Bodyguard		
2005	"Still Tippin'"	Mike Jones			
2005	"Ass Like That"	Eminem	Police Sergeant		
2006	"Let's Ride"	The Game	Police Officer		
2008	"The Man Who Can't Be Moved"	The Script	Policeman		
2009	"Never Say Never"	The Fray	Policeman		
2009	"Time for Miracles"	Adam Lambert	Police Sergeant	Also stunt performer	
2009	"Friend Lover"	Electrik Red	Plumber		
2010	"Momentos"	Noel Schajris	Dockworker	Also stunt coordinator	
2012	"Sorry for Party Rocking"	LMFAO	Police Sergeant	Uncredited	
2012	"Freedom at 21"	Jack White	CHP Motor Officer		
2013	"By Crooked Steps"	Soundgarden	Police Sergeant		
2013	"Happy"	Pharrell Williams	Carwash Attendant	Television short	
2013	"Death Valley"	Fall Out Boy	Police Sergeant		
2014	"Desi Kalakaar"	Yo Yo Honey Singh	Lead Police Sergeant	Also stunt driver	
2015	"Alright"	Kendrick Lamar	Police Sergeant		
2017	"Bellyache"	Billie Eilish: Bellyache (Music Video)	Police Officer		
2018	"This Is America"	Childish Gambino	Police Sergeant		
2018	"That's Alright"	EBEN	Police Officer #2		
2020	"Outsiders (Victims of Tradition)"	Christafari	Bad Usher		
2021	"How High"	The Record Company	Police Officer		
TBA	"Valley of Dry Bones"	Christafari	Padlock	Pre-production	

=== Stuntman ===
Film
Year	Title	Notes	Ref.
1999	Atomic Blue Mexican Wrestler		
2000	Little Heroes 2	Also stunt performer	
2003	Biker Boyz	Also stunt driver	
2003	Cradle 2 the Grave		
2003	13 Dead Men		
2003	Unknown Caller	Also co-director and stunt coordinator	
2005	Pit Fighter		
2006	Werewolf in a Women's Prison	Also stunt coordinator	
2007	Naughty or Nice	Short film	
2008	Magus	Also stunt coordinator	
2008	The Trek	Also stunt driver	
2009	Knock 'Em Dead, Kid		
2009	A Second Chance	Short film Also stunt coordinator	
2009	Safe House	Also stunt performer	
2010	Bio Slime	Also stunt coordinator	
2010	Killjoy 3	Also fight choreographer and stunt coordinator	
2010	The Other Way	Short film Also stunt coordinator	
2011	The Curse of the Apple	Short film Also stunt driver	
2011	Naked Run	Also stunt driver	
2011	Roll Call	Also stunt coordinator	
2012	Choices	Short film Also stunt coordinator	
2012	Already Gone	Short film	
2012	People Like Us	Also stunt coordinator	
2012	Killjoy Goes to Hell	Also stunt coordinator	
2012	Dust Up	Also stunt driver	
2013	Ambushed	Also stunt driver	
2014	Tumbleweed: A True Story	Also stunt performer	
2015	Ol' School	Also stunt coordinator and driver	
2017	Giantess Attack		
2017	Sun Dogs	Also stunt driver	
2018	The Big Break	Short film Also stunt driver	
2019	Counterpunch	Also stunt driver	
2019	Underdog	Also stunt driver	
2019	Intolerance: No More	Also stunt driver	
2019	Feast of Fear	Also stunt coordinator and stunt double	
2020	Killer Waves 2		
2021	Dutch	Also stunt driver	
2021	Blind Ambivalence	Short film Also stunt driver	
2022	Lockdown		
2022	Final X: The Final Experiment	Also stunt coordinator	
2023	Flycatcher	Post-production; Also stunt driver	

Television
Year	Title	Notes	Ref.
2005	Untold Stories of the E.R.	Episode: "Comatose Man in Jail Cell"; Television documentary Also stunt driver	
2006	Where Did It Come From?	Episode: "Ancient Maya: Power Centers"; Also stunt performer Television documentary	
2007	Getting Away with Murder	Episode: "Enter Seth Silver"	
2014	Tattoo Nightmares	2 episodes Also stunt driver	
2015, 2020	David's Vlog	2 episodes Also stunt driver	
2016	Hell's Kitchen	Episode: "3 Chefs Compete"; Precision rider	
2017	Milagros de Navidad	Episode: "Abriendo muros" Also stunt driver Television miniseries	
2019	Deadly Recall	Episode: "An Obsession"; Also stunt driver	
2020	Killer in Suburbia	Also stunt driver	Television film
2020	Brent Rivera	Episode: "Crazy April Fools Pranks On My Sister And Friends"; Also stunt driver	
2021	20/20	Episode: "The Dating Game Killer"; Also stunt driver	
2021	American Cartel	2 episodes Television miniseries Also stunt driver	
2021	Relentless	Also stunt driver	

Music videos
Year	Title	Role	Notes	Ref.
2009	"Time for Miracles"	Adam Lambert		
2010	"Momentos"	Noel Schajris	Also stunt coordinator	
2011	Howlin' For You	Music video Also stunt coordinator Uncredited		
2014	"Desi Kalakaar"	Yo Yo Honey Singh	Also stunt driver	

=== Other film work ===
Other film work
Year	Title	Credited as				Notes	Ref(s)
Year	Title	Director	Writer	Producer	Other	Notes	Ref(s)
2003	Unknown Caller	Yes	No	Yes	Yes	Short film Co-directed with Chris Courtois	
2007	Lords of the Underworld	Yes	Yes	No	Yes	Weapons handler	
2011	Roll Call	No	Yes	Yes	Yes	Co-written with Bill Morroni, Joseph Osborn, D. Patrick McDermott and Jason Sullivan; Animal wrangler	
2014	Free's Freedom	No	No	Yes	No	Short film Technical advisor	
2015	King of Darkness	Yes	No	Yes	Yes		
2018	The Royal Court	Yes	No	Yes	No	Television film	
2019	Feast of Fear	Yes	Yes	Yes	Yes		

=== Films produced ===
As producer

- Unknown Caller (2003)
- Tumbleweed: A True Story (2014)
- Redhead (2023)

As executive producer

- Roll Call (2011)
- Ol' School(2015)
- King of Darkness (2015)
- Feast of Fear (2019)

=== As producer ===
Year	Title	Notes
1999	The Royal Court	TV movie; also director
2013	JustKiddingFilms	Episode: "Interrogation"
