= Killjoy =

Killjoy may refer to:

== People ==
- Margaret Killjoy, American author and musician
- Killjoy (musician) (1969–2018), American vocalist

== Characters ==
- Killjoy, in Charlton Comics' E-Man series
- Killjoy, in the video game Valorant
- Killjoy, in the Marvel Comics series Weapon P.R.I.M.E.
- Killjoy, in the movie The Ice Pirates
- Dr. Killjoy, in the video game The Suffering
- Katie Killjoy, in the adult animation series Hazbin Hotel
- The Fabulous Killjoys, from the band My Chemical Romance

== Film and television ==
- Killjoy, a 1981 made-for-television movie starring Kim Basinger
- Killjoy (film series), a series of 6 horror films featuring the eponymous clown Killjoy
  - Killjoy (2000 film), the first installment, from 2000
  - Killjoy 2: Deliverance from Evil, a 2002 sequel
  - Killjoy 3, a 2010 sequel
  - Killjoy Goes to Hell, a 2012 sequel
- Killjoys, a 2015 science fiction television series

== Music ==
- The Killjoys (Australian band), a 1980s Australian pop-folk band
- The Killjoys (Canadian band), a 1990s Canadian alternative rock band
- The Killjoys (UK band), late 1970s UK punk rock/new wave band
- Killjoy (Finnish Band), 2020s Finnish Metal Band
- Killjoy (Shihad album), 1995
- Killjoy (Fox Stevenson album), 2019
- Killjoy (Coach Party album), 2023
- "The Killjoy", a song by Insomnium from the album Above the Weeping World
- "Mr. Killjoy", a song by Lordi from the special edition of the album The Arockalypse
- Danger Days: The True Lives of the Fabulous Killjoys (My Chemical Romance album)

== Novels ==
- Killjoy, a 2002 novel by Julie Garwood
- (Our Sister) Killjoy, a 1977 novel by Ama Ata Aidoo
- The True Lives of the Fabulous Killjoys (2013-2014), graphic novel by Gerard Way

== Other ==
- Killjoy, the NATO reporting name of the Kh-47M2 Kinzhal missile
