= Killjoy (film series) =

- Directed by: Craig Ross; Tammi Sutton; John Lechago
- Written by: Carl Washington; Douglas Snauffer; Tammi Sutton; John Lechago
- Starring: Ángel Vargas; Trent Haaga
- Cinematography: Carl Bartels; Balthazar Jones; Terrance Ryker
- Edited by: Craig Ross; Don Adams; Henry Gordon Jago
- Music by: Richard Kosinski; Jon Greathouse; Michael Sean Colin
- Distributed by: Full Moon Entertainment; Full Moon Features; Big City Pictures (first and second film); Tempe Entertainment (second film)
- Running time: 220 minutes (combined total)
- Countries: United States; China
- Language: English
- Budget: $180,000 (combined total of first two films)

Killjoy is an American slasher film series which focuses on the titular Killjoy, a demonic clown who is summoned to assist revenge plots in all five films, only to prove too overwhelming for each character who calls him.

== Films ==
Year	Film	Director	Writer	Producer
2000	Killjoy	Craig Ross	Carl Washington	Mel Johnson, Jr. & Charles Band
2002	Killjoy 2: Deliverance from Evil	Tammi Sutton	Tammi Sutton	Charles Band & J. R. Bookwalter
2010	Killjoy 3	John Lechago	John Lechago	Charles Band
2012	Killjoy Goes to Hell	John Lechago	John Lechago	Charles Band
2016	Killjoy’s Psycho Circus	John Lechago	John Lechago	Charles Band
2019	Bunker of Blood 07: Killjoy’s Carnage Caravan	Craig Ross	Brockton McKinney	Mel Johnson, Jr.

Produced by Full Moon Features, the series was established in 2000 with the eponymous first installment, starring Ángel Vargas. A sequel, Killjoy 2: Deliverance from Evil, followed in 2002, which saw Trent Haaga replace Vargas for the role of Killjoy due to Vargas being busy with other projects. In spite of the negative reception of both films, Full Moon filmed a third installment while shooting Puppet Master: Axis of Evil in China, and in 2010 Killjoy 3 was released. Haaga reprised his role for Killjoy 3, eight years after the release of the previous film.

The original film was essentially an effort in the blaxploitation genre, and this was carried over to a lesser extent in Deliverance from Evil. Both of these films consisted of a largely African American cast; however, this element was greatly diminished for Killjoy 3, which was presented as something of a teen-slasher film. The titular character, as a clown, makes a number of crude jokes throughout the first two installments, but Killjoy 3 appears to be a genuine effort in black comedy. The third installment was also a first in establishing that Killjoy can be summoned through a blood pact; two different spoken rituals are used in the earlier films. The first film had a significantly more generous budget than its sequel, at a projected $150,000, dwarfing the $30,000 budget of Deliverance from Evil.

Full Moon Features launched a Kickstarter in early August 2014 to help raise funds for their upcoming movie named Killjoy's Psycho Circus. The company announced that the Kickstarter would raise $60,000 while the company itself would add another $100,000 to make sure the series was produced. Full Moon set a one-month limit to raise their funds. The Kickstarter ended on September 3, 2014 and was unsuccessful. Charles Band has been quoted as saying that this is the company's way of experimenting and bringing their brand into the modern way of filmmaking. The film eventually premiered on October 30, 2016, on the El Rey Network.

== Characters ==
Characters	Film					
Characters	Killjoy	Killjoy 2: Deliverance from Evil	Killjoy 3	Killjoy Goes to Hell	Killjoy's Psycho Circus	Bunker of Blood 07: Killjoy's Carnage Caravan
Characters	2000	2002	2010	2012	2016	2019
Killjoy The Demonic Clown	Angel Vargas	Trent Haaga	Trent Haaga	Trent Haaga	Trent Haaga	Angel Vargas / Trent Haaga
Jada	Vera Yell					
Jamal	Lee Marks					
Monique	"D" Austin					
Michael	Jamal Grimes		Quentin Miles (Ghost)			
"T-Bone"	Corey Hampton					
"Baby Boy"	Rani Goulant					
Kahara	Napiera Danielle Groves					
Homeless Man	Arthur Burghardt					
Lorenzo	William L. Johnson					
Singer	Penny Ford					
Tamara	Dionelle Rochelle					
Ray Jackson	Carl Washington					
Nic		Charles Austin				
Charlotte		Olimpia Fernandez				
Denise Martinez		Debbie Rochon				
Harris Redding		Logan Alexander				
Eddie		Jermaine Cheeseborough				
"Ce-Ce"		Nicole Pulliam				
Kadja		Rhonda Claerbaut				
"Ray-Ray"		Choice Skinner				
Batty Boop The Sexy Clown			Victoria De Mare	Victoria De Mare	Victoria De Mare	Victoria De Mare
Sandie			Jessica Whitaker	Jessica Whitaker		
Rojer			Michael Rupnow			
Zilla			Spiral Jackson			
Erica			Olivia Dawn York			
Punchy The Clown			Al Burke	Al Burke	Al Burke	Al Burke
Freakshow The Mime Clown			Tai Chan Ngo	Tai Chan Ngo	Tai Chan Ngo	Tai Chan Ngo
The Professor			Darrow Igus			
Skid Mark The Clown				John Karyus		
Beelzebub				Stephen Cardwell	Stephen Cardwell	
Detective Ericson				Jason Robert Moore		
Detective Grimley				Cecil Burroughs		
Dr. Simmons				Randy Mermell		
Baliff				Ian Roberts		
Scribe				Jim Tavaré	Jim Tavaré	
Samantha					Victoria Levine	
Jezebel					Lauren Lash	
Handy					Tim Chizmar	Tim Chizmar
Luanne (Note: It is Luann from the Evil Bong franchise, but her name is spelled as Luanne in the film credits.)					Robin Sydney	

== Merchandising ==
- A replica of the Killjoy doll was released in 2003 by Shadow Entertainment.
- A resin statue of Killjoy based on Killjoy's Psycho Circus was released in 2017 by Full Moon collectables
- A resin statue of Batty Boop based on Killjoy's Psycho Circus was released in 2017 by Full Moon collectables
- A latex mask based on Killjoy Goes to Hell was released in 2017 by Trick or Treat Studios, sculpted by Tom Devlin.
- A cloth face mask featuring Killjoy’s lower face was released in 2020 as part of Full Moon’s Series 2 mask line.

== Reception ==
Jimmy Totheo of JoBlo expressed that the series is "cheesy b-movie goodness".

== Comics ==
A Killjoy themed bong appears in the crossover comic The Gingerdead Man meets Evil Bong.

Killjoy and Batty Boop appear in the fourth issue of Dollman Kills the Full Moon Universe, a crossover comic featuring Brick Bardo from Dollman tracking down different Full Moon monsters and villains to kill, published by Full Moon Comix in 2018.
