= Roslyn Gentle =

Australian actress

- Born: Gulgong, New South Wales, Australia
- Other names: Ros Gentle, Roz Gentle
- Occupation: Actress
- Years active: 1983-present

Roslyn Gentle, billed as Ros Gentle and Roz Gentle, is an Australian actress, best known for her role in the television series Prisoner as librarian/prostitute Laura Gardiner/Brandy Carter – an inmate who has multiple personality disorder – in 1983.

== Early life ==
Roslyn Gentle was born in Gulgong, New South Wales in Australia. She spent her childhood studying music, but started her initial day job as a primary school teacher to pay the bills, while singing in nightclubs of an evening. During this period, she also studied acting in order to enhance her performance - only to discover her true calling. Taking this more seriously, she studied and graduated from the National Institute for Dramatic Art (NIDA).

== Career ==
With over 40 years of experience in acting, coaching, producing and directing, Gentle started her acting career in Australia, predominantly in television. She has spent more than 30 years living in the United States where she continues to act.

Gentle also teaches Psychology of Performance at New York Film Academy.

Early Australian acting roles include playing Anna Rossi, a romantic interest for Jim Robinson in the 1985 season of Neighbours. She featured in two episodes of situation comedy Mother and Son, as Wendy, the girlfriend of Arthur Beare (Garry McDonald), whose mother Maggie (Ruth Cracknell) tries to drive off. Gentle also appeared in A Country Practice, G.P., The Young Doctors and The Restless Years.

More recently (in the United States), she played 'The Demon' juror in The People v. O. J. Simpson: American Crime Story (2016) and appeared in guest roles on Lucifer (2018), American Horror Story (2021) and The Young and the Restless (2023). Ros Gentle is set to return as Rachel Blake on Days of Our Lives, with her first appearance scheduled for January 24, 2025.

== Filmography ==
=== Film ===
| Year | Title | Role | Type |
|---|---|---|---|
| 1989 | The Punisher | Reporter | Feature film |
| 2008 | Express 831 | Heather | Short film |
| 2011 | Suing the Devil | Judge Woods | Film |
| 2013 | Discarded | Nurse Candice | Feature film |
| 2015 | Method | Theatre Director | Short film |
| 2015 | Winning Formula | Kerry | Feature film |
| 2016 | Remember When | Rose | Short film |
| 2016 | Sienna's Choice | Dr. Bennett | Short film |
| 2016 | Turbulence | Mrs. Johnson | Feature film |
| 2017 | Becoming Bond | Belinda's Mother | Documentary film |
| 2017 | Throbbin' 84 | Thelma de Groot | Feature film |
| 2018 | Cemetery Tales: A Tale of Two Sisters | Rose | Short film |
| 2019 | Her Mind in Pieces | Elaine | Anthology film (Segment: "Ordinary") |
| 2019 | Ordinary | Elaine | Short film |
| 2019 | Bombshell | Assistant to Murdoch | Feature film |
| 2019 | Gone Hollywood | Mary-Benny's Secretary | TV movie |
| 2021 | Remote Viewing | Dr Meridian | Short film |
| 2021 | Tales from the Other Side | Mary | Anthology film (Segment: "Scary Mary") |
| 2022 | Of the Devil | Gloria | |
| 2022 | Unborn | Sarah | Feature film |
| 2022 | Tomorrow's Game | Charlotte Higgins | Feature film |
| 2024 | Nightbitch | Nana | Feature film |

=== Television ===
| Year | Title | Role | Type |
|---|---|---|---|
| 1983 | Carson's Law | Rosalie | TV series, 2 episodes |
| 1983 | Prisoner | Brandy Carter / Laura Gardiner | TV series, 10 episodes |
| 1984 | Special Squad | Judith Deans | TV series, 1 episode |
| 1985 | Neighbours | Anna Rossi | TV series, 8 episodes |
| 1985 | Mother and Son | Wendy | TV series, 2 episodes |
| 1986 | Land of Hope | Annette | TV miniseries |
| 1986-88 | A Country Practice | Amy Carter | TV series, 5 episodes |
| 1994 | G.P. | Adrienne | TV series, 1 episode |
| 1988 / 1994 | Home and Away | Helen James / Miss Patterson | TV series, 6 episodes |
| 2005 | LAX | Woman | TV series, 1 episode |
| 2012 | Kickin' It | Nanny Dummy | TV series, 1 episode |
| 2013 | Hello Ladies | Mother | Web series, 1 episode |
| 2013 | Outrageous 911 | Sheila | TV series, 1 episode |
| 2014 | Santa Sent Me to the ER | Sandy | TV series, 1 episode |
| 2015 | Tattoo Nightmares | Mom | TV series, 1 episode |
| 2015 | Agent X | Oksana | TV series, 1 episode |
| 2016 | The People v. O. J. Simpson: American Crime Story | 'The Demon' Juror | TV series, 7 episodes |
| 2018 | Lucifer | Snooty Owner | TV series, 1 episode |
| 2018 | Picnic at Hanging Rock | Mrs. Fitzhubert | TV miniseries, 4 episodes |
| 2021 | Wild West Chronicles | Sister Amadeus | TV series, 1 episode |
| 2021 | American Horror Story | Audition Woman | TV series, 1 episode |
| 2021 | Talking Prisoner | Self | TV special |
| 2022 | Prisoner on Earth | Barbara | TV series |
| 2022 | Our Flag Means Death | Mother Bonnet | TV series, 1 episode |
| 2022 | Monster: The Jeffrey Dahmer Story | Coroner | TV miniseries, 1 episode |
| 2023 | High Desert | Grounded Lady | TV series, 1 episode |
| 2023 | The Young and the Restless | Linda Franklin | TV series, 1 episode |
| 2025 | Days of Our Lives | Rachel Blake/The Woman in White | TV series, 14 episodes |
| 2025 | The Residence | Rachel Middlekauff | TV series, 4 episodes |
| TBA | 6:38: The Death of Ronni Chasen | Ronni Chasen | In production |

== Theatre ==
| Year | Title | Role |
|---|---|---|
| 1977 | The Trip | The Australian Theatre, Newtown |
| 1978 | Othello | The Actors Company Theatre |
| 1981 | All's Well That Ends Well | Jane Street Theatre |
| 1982 | Nervous System | Parade Theatre |
| 1982 | Sleeping Beauty | Phillip Street Theatre |
| 1982 | Camino Real | Parade Theatre |
| 1982 | The Crucible | Parade Theatre |
| 1982 | The Crucible | Parade Theatre, The Playhouse, University of Newcastle, Drama Theatre |
| 1982 | Bitter Sweet | Parade Theatre |
| 1985 | Playing Moliere | Stables Theatre |
| 1989 | Big River: The Adventures of Huckleberry Finn | Her Majesty's Theatre, Sydney, Lyric Theatre, Her Majesty's Theatre, Melbourne, Festival Theatre, Adelaide |
| 1991 | The Wizard of Oz - The Musical | State Theatre, Melbourne |

== Video game ==
| Year | Title | Role | Type |
|---|---|---|---|
| 2010 | Command & Conquer 4: Tiberian Twilight | Additional voices | Video game |
