= The Ghouls =

2003 horror film

- Directed by: Chad Ferrin
- Written by: Chad Ferrin
- Produced by: Chad Ferrin; Nicholas Loizides; John Santos; assistant: David DeFino; Trent Haaga; Lewis Jackson
- Starring: Timothy Muskatell; James Gunn; Trent Haaga; Stephen Blackehart
- Cinematography: Nicholas Loizides
- Edited by: Jahad Ferif
- Music by: Nick Smith
- Release dates: November 6, 2003 (Cinematheque); March 8, 2005
- Running time: 81 minutes
- Country: United States
- Language: English

The Ghouls (also known as Cannibal Dead: The Ghouls) is a 2003 independent American horror film that was written and directed by Chad Ferrin.

== Plot ==
Eric Hayes makes his living as a news stringer finding gruesome atrocities and filming them to sell to the media. One night, he stumbles upon some ghouls devouring a young woman in an alley. After discovering that he did not have any film in his camera, Hayes convinces his friend Clift to help him track down the ghouls again.

== Cast ==
- Timothy Muskatell as Eric Hayes
- Trent Haaga as Clift
- Tina Birchfield as Sue
- Gil Espinoza as Juan
- Casey Powell as Benny
- James Gunn as Detective Cotton
- Stephen Blackehart as Police Detective
- Joseph Pilato as Lewis (Joseph Rhodes)
- Ernest M. Garcia as Mr. Wollen (E.M. Garcia)
- Marina Blumenthal as Jessica
- Scott Vogel as Bunuel
- Tiffany Shepis as Ghoul Victim
- Jessica Garcia as Prostitute
- Patrick Floch as The Bartender
- John Santos as Ghoul
- Richard Steele as Ghoul
- Carlo Corazon as Ghoul
- Scott Vogel as Ghoul
- Sharkey Schmit as Ghoul
- Chad Ferrin as Father (uncredited)

== Production ==
The film was independently produced and shot guerrilla style in Los Angeles on Mini DV for $15,000.

== Reception ==
The Ghouls has been described as "a no-budget horror opus" and a "vicious cross between Paparazzi and Kolchak: The Night Stalker".

The film won the 2003 "Sinners Award" at the Saints and Sinners Film Festival.
