= Chop (film) =

- Directed by: Trent Haaga
- Written by: Adam Minarovich
- Produced by: Chad Ferrin; Trent Haaga; Jeff Hamilton
- Starring: Will Keenan; Timothy Muskatell
- Cinematography: Christian Janss
- Edited by: Jahad Ferif
- Music by: Matt Olivo
- Production company: Panfame Films
- Distributed by: Bloody Disgusting Selects
- Release dates: 15 April 2011 (Imagine Film Festival); 27 December 2011 (DVD)
- Running time: 98 minutes
- Country: United States
- Language: English

Chop is a 2011 American horror comedy film directed by Trent Haaga, starring Will Keenan and Timothy Muskatell. The film was Haaga's directorial debut.

== Cast ==
- Will Keenan as Lance Reed
- Timothy Muskatel as The Stranger
- Chad Ferrin as Bobby Reed
- Tanishaa as Emily Reed
- Adam Minarovich as Detective Williams
- Jeffrey Sisson as Jeff the Freak
- Camille Keaton as Mrs. Reed

== Release ==
The movie was released on DVD, Video on demand, Microsoft Movies & TV, Amazon Prime Video, PlayStation Video and iTunes Store on 27 December 2011.

== Reception ==
Joel Harley of Starburst rated the film 5 stars out of 5, criticising the first half an hour of the film, while writing that the film is "fitfully amusing and admirably zany, most notably during its first major chop sequence". Howard Gorman of Scream rated the film 4 stars out of 4. Corey Danna of HorrorNews.net rated the film 5 stars out of 5, writing, "With a terrific cast and script, “Chop” manages to be a hell of a fun film, one that is unpredictable, hilarious, and fun."

Scott Hallam of Dread Central rated the film 4 stars out of 5, praising the acting, the humour, the F/X, and the film's uniqueness. Dave Canfield of ScreenAnarchy wrote a positive review of the film, writing, "Once again Bloody Disgusting Selects has found a genuine minor gem to join the ranks of the increasingly must see series of titles on their label."
