= 1954 in professional wrestling =

1954 in professional wrestling describes the year's events in the world of professional wrestling.

== List of notable promotions ==
Only one promotion held notable shows in 1954.

Promotion Name	Abbreviation
Empresa Mexicana de Lucha Libre	EMLL

== Calendar of notable shows ==
Date	Promotion(s)	Event	Location	Main event
September 26	EMLL	EMLL 21st Anniversary Show	Mexico City, Mexico	Gory Guerrero wrestled Cavernario Galindo to a "no contest" as neither man was able to continue wrestling in a "super libre", No Disqualification match

== Championship changes ==
=== EMLL ===
NWA World Middleweight Championship
incoming champion – Sugi Sito
Date	Winner	Event/Show	Note(s)
January 1	El Santo	EMLL show	

NWA World Welterweight Championship
incoming champion – Blue Demon
No title changes

Mexican National Heavyweight Championship
incoming champion - Firpo Segura
Date	Winner	Event/Show	Note(s)
August 12	Joaquin Murrieta	EMLL show	

Mexican National Middleweight Championship
incoming champion – Uncertain
No title changes

Mexican National Lightweight Championship
incoming champion – Black Shadow
Date	Winner	Event/Show	Note(s)
Uncertain	Vacant	N/A	Championship vacated for undocumented reasons

Mexican National Light Heavyweight Championship
incoming champion – Vacant
No title changes

Mexican National Welterweight Championship
incoming champion – Vacant
No title changes

=== NWA ===
NWA Worlds Heavyweight Championship
Incoming Champion – Lou Thesz
Date	Winner	Event/Show	Note(s)
No title changes

== Debuts ==
- Debut date uncertain:
  - Al Tomko
  - Billy Red Lyons
  - The Destroyer
  - Dory Dixon
  - El Gladiador
  - Joe Higuchi
  - Johnny Weaver
  - Killer Karl Kox
  - Nick Bockwinkel
  - René Guajardo
  - Sandy Scott
- February 4 – Kurt von Brauner
- April – Felipe Ham Lee
- July 29 – Penny Banner
- October 8 – Ray Mendoza
- October – Toyonobori

== Births ==
- Date of birth uncertain:
  - Haiti Kid
- January 1 – Danie Voges (died in 2021)
- January 3 – Dean Hart(died in 1990)
- January 6 – Bullwhip Johnson (died in 2003)
- January 11 – Scott Casey
- January 14 –
  - Jim Duggan
  - Masanobu Fuchi
- January 18 – Ted DiBiase
- January 22 – Tully Blanchard
- February 7 – Rip Rogers
- March 25 – Tim White (died in 2022)
- April 10 – Paul Bearer(died in 2013)
- April 17 – Roddy Piper(died in 2015)
- April 23 – Tony Atlas
- May 13 – Masakre (died in 2012)
- June 1 – Big Bully Busick(died in 2018)
- June 5 – Mocho Cota(died in 2016)
- June 10 – Tom Stone
- June 11 – Lee Wang-pyo (died in 2018)
- July 11 – Butch Reed(died in 2021)
- July 27 – Manny Fernandez
- August 1 – Trevor Berbick (died in 2006)
- August 5 – Matthew Saad Muhammad (died in 2014)
- August 31 – Águila Solitaria
- September 4 – El Signo(died in 2024)
- September 13 – Mike Hogewood (died in 2018)
- September 17 – Bill Irwin
- September 25 – Al Burke
- October 1 – Héctor Guerrero
- October 17 – Black Cat(died in 2006)
- November 8 – Mike Masters (died in 2022)
- November 20 – Kyohei Wada
- December 8 – Gama Singh
- December 13 – Marty Jones
- December 28 – Lanny Poffo(died in 2023)

== Deaths ==
- April 6 - Tiger Jack Fox (47)
- September 3 – Karl Pojello (61)
- September 4 – Maurice Tillet (50)
- October 10 – Tony Stecher (65)
- November 22 – Jess McMahon (72)
- November 26 – Bobby Becker (36)
