= KJ =

KJ or Kj may refer to:

== Language ==
- Kwanyama dialect (ISO 639-1 code alpha-2 kj), a standardized dialect of Oshiwambo
- Kj (letter), a Latin-script digraph

== People ==
- KJ Apa (born 1997), New Zealand actor and singer
- KJ Duff (born 2005), American football player
- KJ Edwards (born 2007), American football player
- KJ Henry (born 1999), American football player
- Khairy Jamaluddin (born 1976), Malaysian politician also known as "KJ"

== Other uses ==
- Kilojoule (kJ), an SI unit of energy equal to 1000 joules
- British Mediterranean Airways (IATA airline code KJ)
- Jeep Liberty, a car (model code KJ)
- Karaoke jockey, a disk jockey who specializes in running karaoke performances
- Kiryas Joel, New York, a village in Monroe, Orange County, New York, US
- Knight of the Order of Saint Joachim
- Kennebec Journal, a newspaper in the U.S. state of Maine

== See also ==
- KJS
- Kay Jay (disambiguation)
- Killjoy (disambiguation)
- King James (disambiguation)
