= Kay Jay =

Kayjay or Kay Jay may refer to:

== Places ==
- Kayjay, Kentucky, USA; an unincorporated community in Knox County; formerly Kay-Jay
- Kay Jay Apartments, Omaha Housing Authority, Omaha, Nebraska, USA

== People and characters ==
=== Persons ===
- Kay-Jay Harris (born 1979), U.S. American football player
- KayJay Sutherland, U.S. musician, a member of the band Odyssey (band)
- Kayjay, a Number One charting artist on the 2007 UK Dance Singles Chart; see List of UK Dance Singles Chart number ones of 2007

=== Fictional characters ===
- Kay Jay, a fictional character from the 2017 film Mass for Shut-Ins

== Groups, organizations ==
- KAJA (FM), San Antonio, Texas; a radio station, branded as "Kay-Jay"
- Kentucky–Jellico Coal Company; see List of geographic acronyms and initialisms

== Other uses ==
- 'Kayjay', a cultivar of the flower Tillandsia aeranthos
- 'Kayjay', a cultivar of the flower Tillandsia stricta

== See also ==
- KJ (disambiguation)
- Kay (disambiguation)
- Jay (disambiguation)
- Jay Kay
