= Stephen Blackehart =

American actor

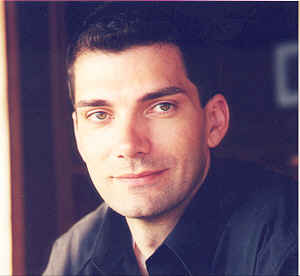
- Born: December 1, 1967 (age 58); New York City, New York, U.S.
- Education: London Academy of Music and Dramatic Art (BA)
- Occupations: Actor; author; producer

Stephen T. Blackehart (born December 1, 1967) is an American character actor, author, and producer.

== Education ==
Blackehart began his artistic education at the University of South Florida under BAFTA-winning character actor Paul Massie, before moving overseas to attend the London Academy of Music and Dramatic Art. While at LAMDA, in addition to the normal study-and-performance curriculum, Blackehart studied swordsmanship under renowned fight masters Rodney Cottier and John Waller, and went on to attain an advanced certification from the Society of British Fight Directors (now called the BASSC). Upon returning to the U.S., he became an active member of Manhattan's Westside Repertory Theatre (at the time the oldest classical theater company in the city), and by day studied at HB Studio under Uta Hagen and with character actor William Hickey.

== Career ==
Blackehart first became known for playing Benny Que in the cult classic film Tromeo and Juliet, though he has since acted in a mixture of B-movies (Retro Puppet Master, The Land That Time Forgot) and mainstream films, many of which are associated with James Gunn (The Belko Experiment, Super, Guardians of the Galaxy, The Suicide Squad), whom he met while working on Tromeo.

In addition to his film work, Blackehart has acted in TV series including Grey's Anatomy, Star Trek: Deep Space Nine, and The Orville. He was a regular on the BBC's The Tromaville Cafe, where he originated the role of Felix, the French Trickster.

In 2004, Blackehart produced Jenna Fischer's mockumentary film LolliLove. It was subsequently picked up for distribution by Troma and garnered DVD Talk's distinction as a "Collector's Series" disc immediately upon its video release. It was also voted #2 by the editors of Amazon in their list of Best DVDs of the Year - Comedy, and completely sold out of all copies within the first day of release.

In 2008 and 2009, he produced the comedy web series PG Porn and Humanzee! for filmmaker James Gunn.

In November 2014, he published a collection of novellas entitled A Stranger to the Darklands and Other Tales.

== Personal life ==
Blackehart is from Hell's Kitchen, New York. It has been reported that Blackehart was born as Stefano Brando and is the son of late actor Marlon Brando, though Blackehart denies that he is related.

James Gunn has emphatically stated that Stephen Blackehart is his best friend.

== Filmography ==
=== Film ===
Year	Title	Role	Notes
1995	The Primal Garden	Frank Dillon	
1995	The Naked Eye	Martin Davis	
1996	Tromeo and Juliet	Benny Que	
1996	Rockabilly Vampire	Wrecks Vincent	
1997	Criminals	Johnny	
1998	Lethal Weapon 4	Police Sergeant	Uncredited
1998	Rush Hour	SWAT Captain	Uncredited
1999	The Other Sister	Cousin Jonathan	Uncredited
1999	Retro Puppet Master	First Servant	Direct-to-video
1999	Blast from the Past	Bartender	Uncredited
2001	Echos of Enlightenment	LAPD Detective	
2002	Romeo & Juliet Revisited	Lycosian Troop	
2002	The First $20 Million Is Always the Hardest	Talking Head at Meeting	Uncredited
2003	The Ghouls	Police Detective	
2004	Tales from the Crapper	Stephen Blackehart	
2004	LolliLove	Ch. 7 Cameraman	
2004	Welcome to Purgatory	Studio Executive	
2007	666: The Beast	Tom	Direct-to-video
2008	100 Million BC	Lt. Robert Peet	Direct-to-video
2008	Death Racers	Harvey Winkler	Direct-to-video
2008	Pants on Fire	Auditioner	
2009	The Terminators	Logan	Direct-to-video
2009	Mega Shark Versus Giant Octopus	U.S. Sub Sonar Chief	Direct-to-video
2009	The Land That Time Forgot	Lonzo	Direct-to-video
2009	2012: Supernova	Agent Greene	Direct-to-video
2010	Airline Disaster	Chief of Staff DeToro	
2010	Super	Quill	
2011	The Whisperer in Darkness	Charlie Tower	
2011	Battle of Los Angeles	Pilot #2 - Lt. Kirkman	Direct-to-video
2012	Hayabusa: The Long Voyage Home	Dr. Curtis Wilson	
2014	P-51 Dragon Fighter	Flt. Lt. Millet	
2014	Guardians of the Galaxy	Knowhere Dispatcher	
2014	The Hive	Soldier #1	
2015	Jurassic City	Detective Henning	
2015	Customer Service Intelligence	Manny Jerial	Direct-to-video
2015	Dominion	The Official	
2016	The Belko Experiment	Robert Hickland	
2017	Guardians of the Galaxy Vol. 2	Brahl	
2017	Charlotte	Frank	
2019	Brightburn	Travis	
2019	Annabelle Comes Home	Thomas	Scenes Deleted
2020	Conjure X	My BFF	
2021	The Suicide Squad	Briscoe	
2023	Guardians of the Galaxy Vol. 3	Steemie	
2025	Superman	Sydney Happersen	
2027	Man of Tomorrow	Sydney Happersen	Post-production

=== Television ===
Year	Title	Role	Notes
1998	Brave New World	Alpha Man at Club	Television film; uncredited
1999	Star Trek: Deep Space Nine	Starfleet Officer / Cardassian Civilian	2 episodes
2001	Big Apple	Jimmy Dugan	3 episodes
2002	Star Trek: Enterprise	Risian Nightclub Patron	Episode: "Two Days and Two Nights"
2005	Grey's Anatomy	Vic	Episode: "The First Cut Is the Deepest"
2006	Passions	Swiss Guard	4 episodes
2007	First Landing	Edward Maria Wingfield	Television film
2007	General Hospital	Silas	Episode #1.11368
2008	Cold Case	Lt. Putnam '51	Episode: "Shore Leave"
2008	Sparky & Mikaela	Kidnapper	Episode: "Pilot"
2008–2009	James Gunn's PG Porn	PigPen / Guido	3 episodes
2018, 2019	The Orville	Krill Second Officer	2 episodes
2022–2025	Peacemaker	Charlie the Gorilla (voice)	Episode: "Monkey Dory"
2022–2025	Peacemaker	Sydney Happersen	2 episodes
2022	The Guardians of the Galaxy Holiday Special	Steemie	Television special
2024	Scare Tactics	Various characters	3 episodes

== Awards ==
- Shared the 2005 Kodak Independent Soul Award with Jenna Fischer for their film, LolliLove
