= KJS =

KJS may refer to:

== Schools ==
- Kinder- und Jugendsportschule (KJS; German: Children and Youth Sports School), a type of sports school found in East Germany
- Kaohsiung Japanese School (KJS), Lingya, Kaohsiung, Taiwan
- The King John School (KJS), South Benfleet, Essex, England, UK
- Kowloon Junior School (KJS), Hung Hom, Kowloon City District, Kowloon, Hong Kong, China; an English Schools Foundation international primary school
- Kenneth J. Shouldice Library (KJS), Lake Superior State University, Sault Ste. Marie, Michigan, USA

== Groups, organizations ==
- Kerala Prisons and Correctional Services (KPCS), Kerala, India; formerly Kerala Jail Services (KJS)
- Kerala Janapaksham (Secular) (KJ(S)), Kerala, India; a political party
- Kohjinsha (KJS), Japanese computer maker
- Katholische Jugendgruppe Saulheim (KJS; German: Saulheim Catholic Youth Group), an organization in Saulheim, Alzey-Worms, Rhineland-Palatinate, Germany
- KJS (King Jesus Saves), a former radio station in Los Angeles, CA, US; predecessor to KWKW
- Korean Journal of Spine
- Kraft Jacobs Sushard, former parent company of Greek chocolatier Ion (chocolate)

== Other uses ==
- kilo-Joules per second (kJ/s), otherwise known as a kilowatt (kW)
- KJS (KDE JavaScript Engine), a discontinued ECMAScript processor that was used in combination with KHTML in Konqueror and with the Linux X/Windows KDE environment; that was later forked into Apple Safari JavaScriptCore
- Kewa language (ISO 639 language code kjs), a language found in Papua New Guinea
- Krishnarajasagar Station (station code KJS), a train station near Hongahalli, Mandya, Mysuru, Kamataka, India
- Kartu Jakarta Sehat (KJS; Indonesian: Healthy Jakarta Card), a healthcare program introduced by Indonesian president Joko Widodo

== See also ==
- KJS-1, a British glider; see List of British gliders
- KJ (disambiguation), for the singular of KJs
