= Unspeakable (2000 film) =

- Director's Cut DVD released by Troma Entertainment
- Directed by: Chad Ferrin
- Written by: Chad Ferrin
- Produced by: Chad Ferrin
- Starring: Roger Garcia; Tina Birchfield; Timothy Muskatell
- Cinematography: Jason Tosta; Nicholas Loizides
- Edited by: Chris Kirkpatrick
- Music by: Nick Smith
- Production company: Crappy World Films
- Distributed by: Troma Entertainment
- Release dates: January 23, 2000 (TromaDance, Park City)
- Running time: 81 minutes
- Country: United States
- Language: English

Unspeakable is a 2000 exploitation film written and directed by Chad Ferrin and starring Roger Garcia, Tina Birchfield, and Timothy Muskatell.

== Plot ==
On his way home from a party, James Fhelleps is involved a car crash that kills his daughter Heather, and leaves his wife Alice disfigured, paralyzed and catatonic. While James aimlessly wanders the city, Alice is cared for by Barry, a coprophilic physical therapist who sexually abuses her. One day, James gives a prostitute named Emmy Bruzze a lift to her house, where James experiences a psychotic break when Emmy tries to seduce him, resulting in him killing her. As James stares at Emmy's body in shock, it begins speaking to him in Heather's voice, begging for help and claiming that God is keeping her from him. James returns home, gets rid of all religious objects in the house, and holds a conversation with Alice, who he is convinced communicates with him telepathically.

James (who is revealed to have molested Heather) believes he can somehow bring Heather back and "beat" God by killing street people, and those who associate with them. After murdering a perverted priest, James is held at gunpoint by Slick, a minion of "street king" Hell, but wounds his assailant, having one of his ears shot off in the struggle. A mob of homeless then attack James, forcing him to flee to his apartment, where he catches Barry having sex with Alice. James disfigures Barry (who narrowly escapes, only to commit suicide in his own home out of fear of prison) and leaves, rigging the place so that it explodes when Slick breaks in, killing him and Alice.

In a daze, James stumbles onto Hell and his lackey Marco harassing a prostitute and her daughter, and kills the two thugs, being shot in the process. The ambiguous ending of the film shows James getting out of bed, going into Heather's bedroom, and telling her to be quiet.

== Cast ==
- Roger Garcia as James Fhelleps
- Tamara Noll as Alice Fhelleps
- Leigh Silver as Heather Fhelleps
- Larry Richards as Doctor Gordon
- Rae Robison as Nurse Bava
- Eddie Shea as The Priest
- Timothy Muskatell as Barry A. Carter
- Tina Birchfield as Jess St. James/Hena
- Stephanie Lane as Sweet Jane
- Scott Vogel as Thirsty Nerd
- Jean Keller as Emmy Bruzze
- Gregory Lee Kenyon as Slick
- Wolf Dangler as Hell
- J.M. Wilkerson as Marco
- Richard Gunn as Jixer

== Reception ==
Film Bizarro wrote that Unspeakable showed promise, concluding "The movie wins points by being fairly ambitious. It's relatively well shot, has some varying effects that mostly look good, actors that seem to handle their characters rather well (even if outrageous at times) and no matter how bad the plot might be at times at least it works within the frames of the film". A two and a half out of five was awarded by Dread Central, which criticized the pace and uninteresting subplots, but wrote, "It's a commendable first effort though, limitations considered, and most certainly does the job of delivering an angry wallop straight to the gut".
