= Killjoy (2000 film) =

2000 American fantasy slasher film

- DVD cover
- Directed by: Craig Ross
- Written by: Carl Washington
- Produced by: Mel Johnson, Jr.
- Starring: Ángel Vargas; Vera Yell; Lee Marks; D Austin; Jamal Grimes; Corey Hampton; Rani Goulant; Napiera Groves; Arthur Burghardt; William L. Johnson; Penny Ford; Dionne Rochelle; Carl Washington
- Cinematography: Carl Bartels
- Edited by: Craig Ross
- Music by: Richard Kosinski
- Production companies: Big City Pictures; Full Moon Pictures
- Distributed by: Full Moon Entertainment
- Release date: October 24, 2000
- Running time: 72 minutes
- Country: United States
- Language: English
- Budget: $150,000

Killjoy is a 2000 American supernatural slasher film directed by Craig Ross, starring Ángel Vargas. It follows a young man who's murdered and seeks revenge through a killer demon clown named Killjoy. It is the first entry in the Killjoy franchise.

== Plot ==
Nerdy high school student Michael asks classmate Jada to attend the homecoming dance with him. Although Michael has unrequited feelings for her, Jada considers him only a friend and politely rejects him, reminding him that she has a boyfriend, gangster Lorenzo, who has repeatedly warned Michael to stay away. Lorenzo arrives to pick up Jada and her friends with his associates T-Bone and Baby Boy. Seeing Michael talking to Jada, they beat him and drive away while a homeless man silently watches from a nearby alley.

That night, Michael uses black magic, a knife, candles, and a clown doll in an attempt to summon Killjoy, a demon of vengeance. The ritual seemingly fails. Later, Lorenzo, T-Bone, and Baby Boy abduct Michael outside his house and take him to a secluded area, where they "accidentally" shoot him and leave him for dead.

One year later, Lorenzo is partying with T-Bone and Baby Boy at a rundown apartment before leaving to meet his new girlfriend, Kahara. T-Bone and Baby Boy approach an ice cream truck whose clown operator claims to sell drugs. He lures them inside and teleports them to an abandoned warehouse. Baby Boy is killed when the speeding truck pins him against a wall, while T-Bone smokes a lit blunt that causes him to burst into flames and disintegrate. Their battered corpses are then teleported back to the apartment.

At Kahara's apartment, Lorenzo investigates a noise and sees a clown fleeing. After finding the ice cream truck outside, he is pulled inside and teleported to the warehouse. Lorenzo shoots the clown repeatedly, but the clown absorbs the bullets and fires them from his mouth, killing him. Kahara later finds Lorenzo's body inside the truck and flees when the clown frightens her.

Meanwhile, Jada develops romantic feelings for classmate Jamal while still struggling with her feelings for both Lorenzo and Michael, particularly knowing that Lorenzo was responsible for Michael's death. After Jada and Jamal sleep together, Monique pages Jada and urgently asks her to come over. Jamal accompanies her to Monique's apartment, where they find Monique with the homeless man who had watched Michael's beating a year earlier.

The homeless man has the three hold hands in a circle, creating a telepathic link through which he explains that Michael's desire for revenge brought Killjoy to life, although the demon's appearance was delayed by Michael's death. Killjoy subsequently killed Lorenzo and his associates. The homeless man reveals that Jada, the clown's true love, is the only person who can destroy the evil within it. He instructs them to destroy the clown doll and tells them that the ice cream truck outside can take them to the clown's lair, then mysteriously vanishes.

Jada, Jamal, and Monique enter the truck and are teleported to the warehouse, where the clown attacks them. They are pursued by undead versions of Lorenzo, Baby Boy, and T-Bone. Jamal kills Lorenzo, Jada kills T-Bone, and Jamal kills Baby Boy. The clown enters carrying Michael's knife but is disarmed by Jamal and Monique. Jada takes the knife as the clown knocks the others unconscious.

The clown asks Jada for a kiss. She agrees on the condition that he leave her world and never return. Instead, the clown transforms into Michael. It is revealed that the clown is actually Michael's resurrected body, using Killjoy's appearance and powers to carry out his revenge; Michael and the clown are one and the same. Michael tells Jada that he did everything for her, but she repeatedly stabs him in the heart, causing him to fade away.

After Jamal and Monique awaken, the trio prepare to return through the ice cream truck, only to find the clown and the undead gangsters behind them. They realize that they must still destroy the doll. The clown taunts them that he cannot die in his own world, forcing them back into the truck. They are transported to Michael's room, where the clown doll lies surrounded by candles. It transforms into Michael, who begs Jada for forgiveness and pleads for his life. She stabs him in the heart with his own knife, destroying the doll and ending his revenge.

The earth shakes, a portal opens, and the undead gangsters are sucked away. Holding hands in a circle, the trio telepathically witness the real Killjoy appear. He taunts Michael for failing and vaporizes him permanently before the trio are transported back to Jamal's apartment. The homeless man thanks them and disappears.

Later, Jada, Jamal, and Monique are at a club when Ray Jackson and his girlfriend Tamara, both from Jada's English class, approach them. Ray claims his brother owns the club and identifies him as Killjoy before laughing maniacally and transforming into the clown, while Tamara becomes Lorenzo.

Jada screams at the reappearance of the men she has struggled to move on from and awakens from the nightmare beside Jamal. He attempts to comfort her, but when he emerges from beneath the covers, he has transformed into the clown. Jada screams as the film cuts to black, suggesting that she will continue struggling to move on from the clown and Lorenzo.

== Cast ==
- Ángel Vargas as Killjoy the Demonic Clown
- Vera Yell as Jada
- Lee Marks as Jamal
- D. Austin as Monique
- Jamal Grimes as Michael
- William L. Johnson as Lorenzo
- Corey Hampton as "T-Bone"
- Rani Goulant as "Baby Boy"
- Napiera Groves as Kahara
- Arthur Burghardt as Homeless Man
- Penny Ford as Singer
- Carl Washington as Ray Jackson
- Dionne Rochelle as Tamara

== Production ==
Killjoy was filmed in Los Angeles on an estimated budget of $150,000. Indoor scenes were primarily filmed at the Lacy Street Production Center, with various locations around the city used for outdoor scenes. Killjoy’s appearance was achieved using plastic prosthetics that took around four to five hours to apply to Angel Vargas’s face, with additional touch-ups later in the filming day to maintain continuity.

Killjoy was director Craig Ross Jr.'s second film after Cappuccino in 1998. He was given the film by Charles Band after repeatedly writing to Full Moon asking to be involved in any of their projects.

== Release ==
The film was first released on DVD and VHS by Full Moon Home Video in November 2000, then again in 2001. It was also released by Film 2000 on March 12, 2001, on DVD. In 2005 it was included in a 4-DVD Collection titled Casket of Death and featuring 4 Full Moon films: The Horrible Doctor Bones, Witchouse, Killjoy, and Vampire Journals. Then between 2012 and 2017, Echo Bridge Home Entertainment included the film (sometimes with its first two sequels) in at least 10 film collections, either being included with other B-Movie psycho killers or other Full Moon properties. For example, on August 7, 2012, the Killjoy trilogy was paired with the Scarecrow trilogy and then on November 6, 2012, paired with 9 of the Puppet Master films in a 12-film collection. The distributor rereleased the collection in 2017.

== Reception ==
Reception to the film has been generally mixed. HorrorNews.net gave the film a mixed review, criticizing the film's low-budget set location as "less than desired", and the effectiveness of the title villain, stating: "while somewhat effective as a reoccurring lesser horror icon-style entity, does in fact come across as poor man’s Wishmaster", although asserting that fans of low-budget horror films will likely find it enjoyable.

Chris Summerfield from Scared Stiff Reviews.com awarded the film a negative score of 4.5 out of 10, criticizing the flatness of several of the film's characters, confusing plot points, and lack of scares.

The YouTube channel “brutalmoose” uploaded a video review of the film, ultimately recommending it to their viewers despite its flaws. While the majority of the video consists of the reviewers analyzing the film's plot for cohesiveness and pointing out the many inconsistencies, they argue that the low budget and the progressively confusing script gives it a “so bad, it’s good” quality with one reviewer even admitting to having watched it twice. They also point out the film's 4 sequels over a nearly 20-year span as evidence of having sustained a fan base of some sort.

DVDbeaver.com made several positive points, despite acknowledging the film's low budget and resulting technical flaws, saying “It’s watchable and interesting enough”. They also commented on how this film could be seen as a response to Candyman—the contrast being this film featuring “Black characters confronting an urban legend without the need of a white audience identification figure”.

== Merchandising ==
A replica of Michael's Killjoy doll was released in 2003 by Shadow Entertainment and Workshop Toys.

== Franchise ==
The film's sequel, Killjoy 2: Deliverance from Evil was released in 2002. A second sequel, Killjoy 3 was released in 2010, followed by Killjoy Goes to Hell in 2012, and Killjoy’s Psycho Circus in 2016. Trent Hagga took over the role of the Killjoy character in the sequels.
