= The Belko Experiment =

2016 film directed by Greg McLean

- Theatrical release poster
- Directed by: Greg McLean
- Written by: James Gunn
- Produced by: Peter Safran; James Gunn
- Starring: John Gallagher Jr.; Tony Goldwyn; Adria Arjona; John C. McGinley; Melonie Diaz; Josh Brener; Michael Rooker
- Cinematography: Luis David Sansas
- Edited by: Julia Wong
- Music by: Tyler Bates
- Production companies: Troll Court Entertainment; The Safran Company; Metro-Goldwyn-Mayer(uncredited)
- Distributed by: Orion Pictures; BH Tilt
- Release dates: September 10, 2016 (TIFF); March 17, 2017 (United States)
- Running time: 89 minutes
- Country: United States
- Language: English
- Budget: $5 million
- Box office: $11.1 million

The Belko Experiment is a 2016 American action horror film directed by Greg McLean and written by James Gunn, who also produced the film with Peter Safran. It stars John Gallagher Jr., Tony Goldwyn, Adria Arjona, John C. McGinley, Melonie Diaz, Josh Brener, and Michael Rooker. The film follows 80 foreigners (mainly Americans) working abroad for a company named Belko Industries in Bogotá, Colombia. One day, after they arrive at work, they are locked inside the building, and a mysterious voice announces that if the employees do not start killing each other, they will be killed themselves.

Filming began on June 1, 2015, in Bogotá, Colombia, and concluded the following month. The film premiered at the TIFF on September 10, 2016, and was released in the USA on March 17, 2017, by Blumhouse Tilt and Orion Pictures. The film received mixed reviews from critics and grossed $11 million worldwide against its $5 million budget.

== Plot ==
Mike Milch and Barry Norris, employees of Belko Industries, arrive at their office building in Bogotá, Colombia, to find unfamiliar security guards turning away local Colombian staff at the gate. New employee Dany Wilkins reports for her first day and is told that a tracking device is implanted in the base of every Belko employee's skull in case of kidnapping. Once all employees arrive, a voice on the intercom instructs them to kill two of their co-workers within 30 minutes, or else there will be consequences. Steel shutters seal off the building, locking them all inside. They ignore the announcement at first, believing it to be a sick prank, but after 30 minutes pass and two have not been killed, four employees die when explosives hidden in their trackers detonate and blow their heads apart. Mike attempts to remove his tracker with a box cutter, but he gives up when the voice threatens to detonate his explosive unless he stops.

The group is told that unless 30 of them are dead within two hours, 60 will be killed. They split into two factions, one led by Mike, who believes there should be no killing, and one led by Barry, who intends to follow the directions to save himself. Barry and his group, including executive Wendell and employees Terry, Antonio, and Bradley, attempt to burn off the lock of the armory to gain access to its weapons. Mike and his group, including his girlfriend, Leandra Florez, Evan, and employees Keith, Leota, Peggy, Vince, and Roberto, try to hang banners from the roof as a call for help, but soldiers outside shoot at them. Barry, Wendell, and Terry ambush the group in the stairway, kill Evan, and take his keys to the armory.

With their group now armed, Barry and Wendell select 30 people, including Mike and Peggy, forcing them to kneel in a line. Barry begins executing them. Dany, who has been hiding in the basement, sees what is happening and shuts off the building's lights before Mike and several others can be killed. The employees run for cover as Barry and his group start firing, killing several more. However, employees gang up on Bradley and Antonio and kill them. Meanwhile, Dany goes into the elevator shaft with Roberto.

Barry and Wendell hunt down the fleeing employees as the voice informs them that only 29 have been killed. When the two-hour time limit runs out, 31 more people are killed by their trackers, including Terry, Leota, Peggy, and Keith, leaving only 16 survivors. They are then informed by the voice that, as a final task, the employee who has killed the most people within an hour will be spared. Barry finds Dany and Roberto in the elevator shaft. Dany escapes while Roberto is crushed and killed by the elevator. Leandra finds two employees, Marty and Chet, collecting unexploded trackers from the heads of people who have died by other methods. They tell her they plan to use them to blow up the wall. However, they are killed by Wendell. Leandra kills Wendell, leaving six final survivors: Vince, Mike, Barry, Dany, Leandra, and Liezle, who dies shortly afterward. Barry shoots Vince and Dany, killing them, and also shoots Leandra. With her dying breath, she proclaims her love to Mike.

In a rage, Mike bludgeons Barry to death with a tape dispenser. The building is then unsealed, as he is the last survivor, and the soldiers escort him to the hangar next door. There, he meets the owner of the voice, who explains they are part of an international organization studying human behavior. As he and his colleagues begin questioning Mike about his emotional state, Mike notices a panel of switches corresponding to the 80 employees. Having planted the trackers that Marty collected on the soldiers and the voice, he flips every remaining switch except his own. The trackers explode, killing the soldiers and wounding the voice, before Mike grabs a gun and kills the remaining men. He then staggers outside.

It becomes apparent that Mike is one of many sole survivors from similar experiments, being watched by another group through security cameras. A new voice states, "End stage one. Commence stage two."

== Cast ==
- John Gallagher Jr. as Mike Milch, an employee at Belko Industries
- Tony Goldwyn as Barry Norris, the COO of Belko and an ex-special forces soldier
- Adria Arjona as Leandra Florez, Barry's assistant and Mike's love interest
- John C. McGinley as Wendell Dukes, a socially awkward top executive
- Melonie Diaz as Dany Wilkins, a new hire at Belko
- Owain Yeoman as Terry Winters, Mike's co-worker and friend.
- Sean Gunn as Marty Espenscheid, a cafeteria worker
- Brent Sexton as Vince Agostino, Belko's head of human resources
- Josh Brener as Keith McLure, a tech worker
- David Dastmalchian as Alonso "Lonny" Crane, a maintenance worker under Bud
- David Del Rio as Roberto Jerez, a worker who befriends Dany.
- Gregg Henry as The Voice
- Michael Rooker as Bud Melks, Belko's head of Maintenance
- Rusty Schwimmer as Peggy Displasia, Mike's secretary
- Gail Bean as Leota Hynek, a worker who befriends Dany
- James Earl as Evan Smith, Belko's only security guard
- Abraham Benrubi as Chet Valincourt, Marty's best friend
- Valentine Miele as Ross Reynolds, a sales representative for Belko
- Stephen Blackehart as Robert Hickland, an interpreter
- Benjamin Byron Davis as Antonio Fowler, a worker.
- Silvia de Dios as Helena Barton, the supervisor of Roberto, Leota, Bradley and Dany
- Cindy Better as Lorena Checo, a worker who pretends to be friendly to Barry.
- Andres Suarez as Bradley Lang, Dany's co-worker
- Alietta Montero as Liezle Freemont, a cafeteria worker.
- Joe Fria as Tyson Moon, Wendell's friend.
- Mikaela Hoover as Raziya Memarian, Vince's assistant
- Maia Landaburu as Louisa "Raven" Luna, a worker.
- Santiago Bejarano as Luis Costa, an elderly worker.
- Maruia Shelton as Agnes Meraz, a co-worker of Luigi.
- Luna Baxter as Samantha Arcos, a co-worker of Mike.
- Maria Juliana Caicedo as Lucy Martinez, a friend of Chet and Marty.
- Kristina Lilley as Sarah Mariana, a worker. She is the last person to arrive before the experiment begins.
- Juan Ortega as Luigi Moretti, a co-worker of Agnes.
- Jason Ismael Lopez as Mike, a co worker of Luigi
- Yeison Alvarez as Lawrence Fitzgibbon, Evan's best friend.
- Silvia Varón as Frances Anne, the only wheelchair-using employee of Belko.
- Lorena Tobar as J. Ferguson, an elderly cafeteria worker.
- Ximena Rodriguez as A. Huberman, a cafeteria worker.
- Álvaro García as Jonathan Schwartz, an elderly worker.
- Guillermo Galindo as Carlos Yanez, an elderly worker.
- David Cantor as Griffin Myers, a cafeteria worker.
- Charles Daze as Tim Gallaher, a worker.

== Production ==
James Gunn began writing the film around 2007, after waking up from a dream of an office building being enclosed in metal walls and hearing a voice instruct employees to kill each other. The film was greenlit soon thereafter, and plans were made for it to be filmed in São Paulo, Brazil, with Gunn directing. However, Gunn turned down the opportunity, owing to getting a divorce around the same time. Gunn later said, "I just wanted to be around my friends and family. I didn't want to go shoot this thing that was about people who loved and cared about each other being forced into killing each other. It just didn't seem to be the way I wanted to spend the next few months of my life. So I backed out of it." Gunn moved on to other projects, including Super (2010), and had "kind of forgotten about it" until he received a call from Jon Glickman at MGM asking if he would still be interested in making it. Gunn did not have time to direct the film himself, due to his work on Guardians of the Galaxy (2014) and Guardians of the Galaxy Vol. 2 (2017), but he agreed to produce it, provided that he was given full creative control.

Much of the cast was announced in May 2015, including John Gallagher Jr., Tony Goldwyn, and Melonie Diaz. More joined the cast in June, including David Del Rio, Stephen Blackehart, Josh Brener, and Rusty Schwimmer. Principal photography on the film began on June 1, 2015, in Bogotá, Colombia. and concluded on July 12, 2015.

== Release ==
The film premiered at the TIFF on September 10, 2016. Shortly after, Blumhouse Tilt and Orion Pictures acquired U.S. distribution rights to the film, and set it for a March 17, 2017, release. It was released to UK theaters on April 15, 2017.

The film was promoted through a series of four claymation shorts directed by Lee Hardcastle which, according to website io9 (where they debuted), "features exaggerated versions of The Belko Experiment's characters, and offers a taste of the level of violence and humor you'll see when the actual movie opens". The movie was also promoted with a video game, "'Belko Experiment' Escape Room in VR", released for virtual reality platforms.

== Reception ==
=== Box office ===
In the United States and Canada, The Belko Experiment was released alongside Beauty and the Beast and was projected to gross around $4 million in its opening weekend. It made $305,000 from Thursday night previews and $1.5 million on its first day. It went on to open to $4.1 million, finishing seventh at the box office.

=== Critical response ===
According to the review aggregator website Rotten Tomatoes, 55% of critics have given the film a positive review based on 105 reviews and an average rating of 5.6/10. The site's critics consensus reads, "The Belko Experiment offers a few moments of lurid fun for genre enthusiasts, but lacks enough subversive smarts to consistently engage once the carnage kicks in." On Metacritic, the film has a score 44 out of 100 based on 21 critics, indicating "mixed or average reviews".

== See also ==
- Mean Guns, a 1997 film with a similar plot device
- The Tournament, a 2009 film with a similar plot device
- Mayhem, a 2017 film with a similar premise
- Office Uprising, a 2018 film with a similar premise
