= Deadgirl =

2008 American horror film

- Theatrical release poster
- Directed by: Marcel Sarmiento; Gadi Harel
- Written by: Trent Haaga
- Produced by: Marcel Sarmiento; Gadi Harel
- Starring: Shiloh Fernandez; Noah Segan; Candice Accola; Jenny Spain
- Cinematography: Harris Charalambous
- Edited by: Phillip Blackford
- Music by: Joseph Bauer
- Production company: Hollywoodmade
- Distributed by: Dark Sky Films
- Release dates: September 6, 2008 (TIFF); July 24, 2009 (United States)
- Running time: 101 minutes
- Country: United States
- Language: English

Deadgirl is a 2008 American horror film directed by Marcel Sarmiento and Gadi Harel and written by Trent Haaga. It follows two teenage boys (Shiloh Fernandez and Noah Segan) whose friendship is tested when they discover a naked female zombie (Jenny Spain), with one boy wanting to keep her as a sex slave and the other boy wanting to free her.

== Plot ==
Rickie and J.T. are two high school seniors who gaze at the girls they wish they could get, especially Joann, whom Rickie has known since he was a child. One day, they cut class and end up in an abandoned psychiatric hospital. They discover a mute, naked woman in the basement, chained to a table. J.T. considers raping her, and after failing to dissuade him, Rickie leaves but tells no one about their discovery. The next day, J.T. reveals that the woman is undead, which he discovered after attempting to kill her, and nicknames her "Deadgirl".

Rickie finds that J.T. invited their friend Wheeler to join him and decides to free her. Rickie only manages to free one hand before J.T. and Wheeler arrive. As J.T. begins to rape her, the woman scratches his face.

Despite knowing she has a boyfriend, Rickie asks Joann out and gets rejected. Her boyfriend Johnny and Dwyer, Johnny's friend, beat up Rickie and Wheeler. Wheeler baits them into coming to see Deadgirl. Rickie convinces Johnny to force Deadgirl to perform oral sex on him, and she bites Johnny's penis. The next day, in the school bathroom, Johnny finds out he is infected and runs to the bathroom. His intestines burst out of his body, and he is found in a vegetative state in the bathroom, leaving him in the same undead state as Deadgirl.

Noticing Deadgirl's rotting body, J.T. and Wheeler decide to make a new Deadgirl. They wait outside a gas station but fail to kidnap a female victim. When Joann confronts them about Johnny, they capture her.

Rickie, still intending to free Deadgirl, heads to the basement with a machete. He finds Joann and Deadgirl tied to each other. J.T. tries to convince Rickie to let Deadgirl bite Joann, while Wheeler starts to feel her up. Rickie defends her by slicing Wheeler's hand off. Joann unties Deadgirl, who feeds on Wheeler and J.T.

Rickie and Joann flee but cannot escape through the locked entrance. Rickie runs off to find an escape route, and when he returns, Joann is gone. He returns to the basement, where Deadgirl knocks him down, breaks down the door, and escapes outside. Rickie finds Joann and sees that J.T. has stabbed her in the back. J.T. urges Rickie to let him bite her so she will live undead. Rickie assures Joann that he loves her and will save her. She coughs blood into his face and rejects him again, then slowly dies afterward.

Later, Rickie's life has seemingly returned to normal. However, it is shown that he returns to the asylum's basement where Joann has transformed into a deadgirl herself.

== Cast ==
- Shiloh Fernandez as Rickie
- Noah Segan as J.T.
- Candice Accola as Joann
- Jenny Spain as Deadgirl
- Michael Bowen as Clint
- Andrew DiPalma as Johnny
- Eric Podnar as Wheeler
- Nolan Gerard Funk as Dwyer
- Christina Blevins as Amanda
- Kelle Cantwell as Britt
- Shushig DerStepanian as Elizabeth
- David Alan Graf as Mr. Harrison
- Dustin Hess as Walter
- Susan Marie Keller as Nikki
- Christina Masterson as Rosie

== Production ==
Deadgirl was the only feature film by Hollywoodmade, a now-defunct production company in Los Angeles. It is rated R for "strong aberrant sexuality, graphic nudity, bloody violence, and pervasive language".

== Release ==
Deadgirl premiered at the 2008 Toronto International Film Festival. It was also screened that year at Fantastic Fest, the Sitges International Film Festival, AFI Fest, the San Sebastian Fantasy Film Festival, the Cucalorus Film Festival, the Leeds International Film Festival, Stockholm International Film Festival, Melbourne Underground Film Festival, and the Lone Star International Film Festival. It was released in the U.S. by Dark Sky Films on July 24, 2009.

VCR Records released Joseph Bauer's soundtrack for the film on vinyl in 2015.

== Reception ==
Deadgirl has a 37% approval rating on Rotten Tomatoes based on 17 reviews, with an average rating of 4.52/10. Peter Debruge of Variety complimented the acting and atmosphere in the early scenes, and wrote that it "takes a disturbing adolescent male fantasy and glosses it up just enough to pass for a legitimate horror movie".

The film was controversial; in response to accusations of misogyny, screenwriter Trent Haaga proposed a sequel about two women who find a naked male zombie. In 2012, Complex ranked the film at No. 4 on its list of the 15 most uncomfortable moments of female nudity in film.
