= Jenny Spain =

American actress

- Born: Jenny Spain; July 2, 1980 (age 45); San Diego, California
- Occupations: Actress, Model
- Years active: 2007-present

Jenny Spain (born July 2, 1980, in San Diego, California) is an American actress. She is of Spanish descent.

In 2007, Spain appeared in her first short film All The Girls Fake (which won an award at East Lansing Film Festival), and she also portrayed the title character in the 2008 movie Deadgirl.

== Filmography ==
- All The Fake Girls (2007 short film)
- Deadgirl (2008)
- Trust (2010)
- Harvest (2011 short film)
- American Girls (2013)
