= Easter Bunny, Kill! Kill! =

2006 film by Chad Ferrin

- DVD cover
- Directed by: Chad Ferrin
- Written by: Chad Ferrin
- Produced by: Trent Haaga
- Starring: Timothy Muskatell; Charlotte Marie; Ricardo Gray; David Z. Stamp; Trent Haaga
- Cinematography: Giuseppe Asaro
- Edited by: Jahad Ferif
- Music by: The Giallos Flame
- Production company: Crappy World Films
- Distributed by: Vicious Circle Films; Breaking Glass Pictures
- Release date: August 4, 2006 (Twisted Nightmare Weekend)
- Running time: 90 minutes
- Country: United States
- Language: English

Easter Bunny, Kill! Kill! is a 2006 American slasher film directed and written by Chad Ferrin. It stars Timothy Muskatell, Charlotte Marie, Ricardo Gray, David Z. Stamp, and Trent Haaga, who also produced the film.

Easter Bunny, Kill! Kill! had its world premiere at Twisted Nightmare Weekend on August 4, 2006. It was released on VOD platforms on April 1, 2010, and on DVD on June 1, 2010.

== Plot ==
The night before Easter, a lowlife named Remington dons an Easter Bunny mask, and robs a convenience store with a shotgun, shooting the clerk in the mouth. Remington is then revealed to have charmed his way into the life of widow Mindy Peters, a nurse who lives with her cerebral palsy-afflicted son Nicholas, who Remington torments when Mindy is not around. While taking out the garbage, Nicholas befriends a disfigured vagrant who gives him a rabbit he claims is an Easter Bunny. Nicholas decides to keep the rabbit a secret, but it is discovered by Remington, who threatens to kill it if Nicholas says anything bad about him to Mindy.

On Easter, Mindy has to work a double shift, so she leaves Nicholas alone with Remington, after the latter kicks out some unscrupulous home renovators. As soon as Mindy leaves, Remington assaults Nicholas, and calls over a physically disabled and pedophilic acquaintance named Ray, who he "rents" Nicholas to in exchange for money and drugs. Remington goes to get prostitutes, and while Ray searches for Nicholas, someone wearing Remington's discarded Easter Bunny mask murders him with a knife, and a drill. As the killer disposes of Ray's body, the renovators return to pick up their tools, and ransack the house. The killer disembowels one with a circular saw, and wounds another with a hammer as the remaining one is approached by the vagrant.

Remington arrives with a pair of prostitutes named Candy and Brooke, and they are attacked by the injured and disoriented handyman (who Remington kills with a flashlight) and the killer. Candy is impaled through the mouth with a broomstick handle, Brooke is stabbed with a piece of glass, and Remington has his throat slit. The killer is shown to be Mindy, who taunts Remington as he dies, stating, "I hid, and watched, and I saw how you treated Nicholas. I heard every venomous word that spewed through your deceitful mouth. Until I ended it. Just like his father". A flashback then shows that exactly a decade prior, Mindy set Donald, her abusive husband, on fire because he regarded Nicholas as a burdensome freak.

The homeless man enters, and is revealed to be Donald, who asks for forgiveness, and acceptance back into the family, unveiling to Mindy and Nicholas the head of a renovator he had murdered to help Mindy. The three embrace, and the film ends with Donald saying, "Now, what do you say we clean up these dead bodies, and start a family, huh?"

== Cast ==
- Timothy Muskatell as Remington Rashkor
- Ricardo Gray as Nicholas Peters
  - Max Haaga as Young Nicholas Peters
- Charlotte Marie as Mindy Peters
- David Z. Stamp as Ray Mann
- Jose I. Lopez as Jorge
- Marina Blumenthal as Lupe
- Ernesto Redarta as Jesus "BF" Ferrer
- Amy Szychowski as Brooke
- Kele Ward as Candy
- Wolf Dangler as Bunny Killer
- Granny as Easter Bunny
- Jeff Sisson as Ken Johnston
- Kirk Sever as Billy Wilder
- Trent Haaga as Donald Simmons

== Reception ==
On the review aggregator website Rotten Tomatoes, 100% of 6 critics' reviews are positive, with an average rating of 6.7/10.

- A 3/5 was awarded by Bloody Disgusting, which wrote, "To be frank, Easter Bunny, Kill! Kill! is a pretty shallow exercise, but Ferrin seems to know that and doesn't masquerade the film as anything other than what it actually is – a fun, pretense-free throwback to a bygone era of exploitation cinema. It's this sense of play that slightly elevates the film above Ferrin's Someone's Knocking at the Door, a movie I felt tried too hard to be about something when it would've worked better by simply following through on its gonzo premise. There's no such attempt at message-making in EBKK; it's sheer camp, a tongue-in-cheek nightmare of blood-splattered psychedelia and over-the-top (albeit clumsily edited) kills".
- Steve Barton of Dread Central gave the film a score of 3½ out of 5, called it well acted and competently made, and stated, "My advice? If you see it playing at a festival somewhere and you have the stomach for it, do not miss it. Easter Bunny, Kill! Kill! revels in its obscenity and packs enough punch to knock out even the most jaded of viewers".
- DVD Talk's Jeremy Biltz bestowed a grade of 2½ out of 5, and gave his final thoughts as, "Easter Bunny Kill Kill is pure, bottled weirdness. It's creepy, tense, gory and fun. It also has some significant flaws in the acting, story and pacing. It's no cinematic masterpiece, but there is a body of considerable talent lurking beneath the surface that pokes its head up from time to time. Rent this one".
