= Tales from the Crapper =

- Theatrical Poster
- Directed by: Gabriel Friedman; Chad Ferrin (space crash segment); David Paiko (“Soul Stripper” segment); Brian Spitz (“Freeride” segment); Lloyd Kaufman (uncredited)
- Written by: Mark C. Adams; Edward Havens; Adam Jahnke
- Produced by: Ramzi Abed; Gabriel Friedman; Michael Herz; Lloyd Kaufman; India Allen
- Starring: Julie Strain; Masuimi Max; Ron Jeremy; James Gunn; Debbie Rochon; Kevin Eastman; Arban Ornelas; Jorge Garcia
- Cinematography: Steven Vasquez
- Production companies: Mach Studios; Geanre
- Distributed by: Troma Entertainment
- Release date: September 28, 2004 (United States)
- Running time: 90 minutes
- Language: English

Tales from the Crapper is a 2004 American straight-to-video anthology film that was a spoof of the Tales from the Crypt comics. The film was released by Troma Entertainment.

== Plot ==
Troma Entertainment co-founder and B-movie director and producer Lloyd Kaufman plays the Crap Keeper. He presents the viewers with two horror stories that contain gore, nudity, fat men, talking penises, lesbian scenes, vampires, UFOs, and appearances by porn star Ron Jeremy and the band New Found Glory. The film was purportedly shot over three years with six directors and close to fifteen writers.

== Cast ==
Actor	Role
Julie Strain	Ivanna Dance / Amanda Samantha
Lloyd Kaufman	The Crap Keeper / Dad / Voice of Tromantis
Kevin Eastman	Travis Dance
Jorge Garcia	Raccoon Head
Trey Parker	Steve Keen
James Gunn	Himself
Ron Jeremy	Jimmy
Ted Raimi	Next Door Neighbor
India Allen	Sally Sterks
Gabriel Friedman	Strip Bar Announcer / Voice of Larry / Voice of Deacon / Oliver Stone
Debbie Rochon	Herself / Zelda Lipschitz
Joe Fleishaker	Michael Herz / 500 pound candygramm
New Found Glory	Jewish party-goers
Eli Roth	Gay Party-goer
Trent Haaga	Shocked Party-goer
Wes Craven	Himself
Stephen Blackehart	Himself
Chad Ferrin	Himself
Count Smokula	Himself
Arban Ornelas	Lesbian Vampire
Masuimi Max	Lesbian Vampire

== Production ==
The film started pre-production in early 2001, after a successful digitized web-comic starring Yaniv Sharon entitled Tales From the Crapper hit the Troma website. After the three-part comic was done, Troma President Lloyd Kaufman wanted a real series on their website to be made. A contract was done with India Allen, who had recently produced and directed the film The Rowdy Girls which Troma distributed. The budget for the first season was $200,000.

After more than a year of production, Troma received the footage that was shot and it was unwatchable. In some cases, there was missing sound, the camera-work seemed unprofessional. All of the episodes were unfinished. Lloyd Kaufman and Michael Herz were even more displeased when they found out that the entire budget was gone. In order to salvage the project, Lloyd Kaufman got former Troma alumni to re-work the script and find new uses for the footage shot. In 2003, re-shooting began both in Los Angeles and New York with Kaufman overseeing production. Gabriel Friedman, Troma's editor at the time, had made a list of the shots that were needed for the rewrites that they were working on. Despite Friedman and Kaufman being clear on what to do, many problems arose as well in the re-shoot with incompetent crew members. This led to years of post-production. In order to make scenes fit together and due to the lack of sound on most of the footage, many scenes had to be re-dubbed. Both segments, which started out as horror films with a slice of comedy, had now become over-the-top comedy.

== See also ==
- Troma Entertainment
- Lloyd Kaufman
- Tales from the Crypt
