= Chad Ferrin =

American actor

- Occupations: Film director, screenwriter, Film actor

Chad Ferrin is an American horror film director, screenwriter, producer and actor.

== Biography ==
Ferrin first broke into the film industry as a production assistant on films such as Halloween: The Curse of Michael Myers and Hellraiser: Bloodline. He moved on to directing episodes of the Troma television series Troma's Edge TV.

Unspeakable marked Ferrin's writing and feature directing debut. The film, shot for $20,000, was released by Troma.

Ferrin next wrote, produced and directed The Ghouls. Called "a no-budget horror opus", the film was shot on Mini DV for $15,000.

After The Ghouls, Ferrin directed one segment of the Troma film Tales from the Crapper in 2004. This direct-to-DVD film starred Lloyd Kaufman, James Gunn, Julie Strain and Ron Jeremy.

Ferrin's film Easter Bunny, Kill! Kill! has become a cult classic with horror fans worldwide. The DVD for Ferrin's film Someone's Knocking at the Door was released on 25 May 2010. Both of Ferrin's films Someone's Knocking at the Door and Easter Bunny Kill! Kill! are part of the Dark Delicacies collection 2010. Ferrin narrated his film Someone's Knocking at the Door upon its re-release on 24 July 2010 at the Sci-Fi Center in Sin City. Ferrin is the director of the 2016 horror film The Chair, based on the graphic novel from Alterna Comics, and starring Naomi Grossman.

== Filmography ==
Year	Title	Director	Writer	Producer	Actor	Notes
1997	Blood Bath	Yes	Yes	Yes	No	Short Film
2000	Unspeakable	Yes	Yes	Yes	Yes	
2000	Troma's Edge TV	Yes	No	No	Yes	
2003	The Ghouls	Yes	Yes	Yes	Yes	aka Cannibal Dead: The Ghouls (UK video title)
2004	Tales from the Crapper	Yes	No	No	No	Director "Space Crash" Segment
2006	Easter Bunny, Kill! Kill!	Yes	Yes	Yes	No	
2009	Someone's Knocking at the Door	Yes	Yes	Yes	No	
2016	The Chair	Yes	No	No	No	
2016	Parasites	Yes	Yes	Yes	No	aka Attack in LA
2020	Exorcism at 60,000 Feet	Yes	No	No	No	
2020	The Deep Ones	Yes	Yes	Yes	No	
2021	The Night Caller	Yes	Yes	Yes	No	
2022	Pig Killer	Yes	Yes	Yes	No	
2023	Scalper	Yes	Yes	Yes	No	sequel to The Night Caller
2024	The Dark Ones	Yes	Yes	Yes	No	sequel to The Deep Ones
2024	Unspeakable: Beyond the Wall of Sleep	Yes	Yes	Yes	No	sequel to Unspeakable
2025	Ed Kemper	Yes	Yes	Yes	No	co-written with Stephen Johnston
2025	Dorothea	Yes	Yes	Yes	No	
2026	Sunset Strip Killers	Yes	No	Yes	No	
2026	Devil's Disciple: The Night Stalker	Yes	Yes	Yes	No	
