= Carl Washington =

American actor, writer, and producer

- Born: December 18, 1978 (age 47); Los Angeles, California, United States
- Occupations: Actor, writer, film producer

Carl Edward Washington (born December 18, 1978) is an American actor, writer, and producer.

== Early life ==
He was born in Los Angeles, California in the Hollywood area. He attended and graduated Westchester High School in June 1997. He started extra work at 16 appearing in such films as Mars Attacks, Jingle All the Way and the zombie film Hood of the Living Dead.

== Filmography ==
- As Writer
- Chat Room (2002)
- As Producer
- Urban Massacre (2002)
- Latin Kingz (2003)
- Sweet Potato Pie (2004)
- J.C. in tha Hood (2006)
- Unemployed (2007)
- As Actor
- Killjoy (2000)
- The Chatroom (2002)
- Dead Season (2002)
- The Crawling Brain (2002)
- Voodoo Tailz (2002)
- Creepies (2003)
- Midnight is Coming (2003)
- Jack Movez (2003)
- Hot Parts (2003)
- Latin Kingz (2003)
- Drug Lordz (2003)
- Dope Game 2 (2003)
- Tha' Crib (2004)
- Wild Things 2 (2004)
- Sweet Potato Pie (2004)
- East L.A. King (2004)
- I Got Five on It (2005)
- Rampart (2005)
- Hood of the Living Dead (2005)
- Slaughter Party (2005)
- Evil Ever After (2006)
- J.C. in the Hood (2006)
- Illegal Business (2006)
- Broken Glass (2006)
- Aces (2006)
