= Nicole Pulliam =

American actress

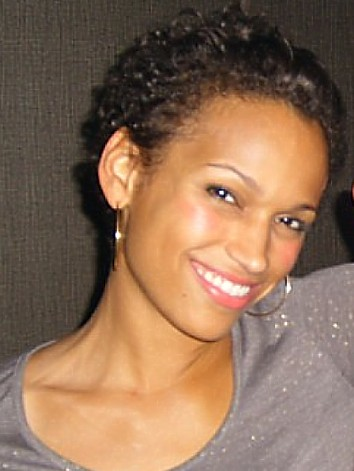
- Occupation: Television actress

Nicole Pulliam is an American actress.

== Filmography ==
=== Film ===
Year	Title	Role	Notes
1998	One Foot in the Grave	Charloette	
1999	Thick as Thieves	Cassandra	
2000	The Horrible Dr. Bones	Rasha	
2002	Killjoy 2: Deliverance from Evil	Cecile 'Ce-Ce' Washington	Video
2002	Rappin-n-Rhyming	Mia Trada	
2001	Kingston High	Trina	
2003	Holes	Mrs. Sweetfeet	
2004	The Last Run	Erin	
2009	Dukes and Dutchess	Zukura	
2010	Inception	Lobby Sub Con	
2011	Sick Day	Female Executive	Video short
2014	Barry Price	Skyler	

=== Television ===
Year	Title	Role	Notes
1997	Saved by the Bell: The New Class	Jennifer	"Highs and Lows"
2000	Arrest & Trial	Maryann	"King Tut"
2000-2003	The Man Show	Juggy Dancer	Regular role
2001	The Hughleys	Patty	"Titanic 2: Electric Boogaloo"
2001	Spyder Games	Model #1	"1.33"
2003	Half & Half	Girl	"The Big Phat Mouth Episode: Parts 1 & 2"
2004	Crossing Jordan	Young Mrs. Avery	"Justice Delayed"
2006	Fashion House	Nikki Clark	Main role
2006	The Young and the Restless	Nurse	"1.8300"
2007/2015	The Game	Raquel	"Turkey Basting Bitches" "Pow Pow Pow"
2007	CSI: NY	Bartender	"Child's Play"
2008	Entourage	Flight Attendant	"The All Out Fall Out", "First Class Jerk"
2009	Eleventh Hour	Medical Assistant	"Eternal"
2011	Love Bites	Woman	"Keep on Truckin'", "Sky High"
2011	Crazy Love	Monica King	TV series
2011	Revenge	Diane Kingsly	"Betrayal"
2014	Brooklyn Nine-Nine	Angela D'Beverly	"Operation: Broken Feather"
2014	Shameless	Denise	"Emily"
2014	Teen Wolf	Dr. Wentz	"Weaponized"
