= Mel Johnson Jr. =

American actor

- Born: 1953 (age 72–73); Long Island City, Queens, New York, US
- Occupations: Actor, producer, theatre director
- Years active: 1978–present

Mel Johnson Jr. (born 1953) is an American character actor and film producer from Long Island City, Queens, in New York City.

== Biography ==
Johnson portrays the mutant cab driver and Mars secret agent Benny in the 1990 hit science fiction film Total Recall. He also starred in the Broadway musical On the Twentieth Century and appeared in the Public Theater's "Shakespeare in the Park" 2005 revival of Two Gentlemen of Verona. He was also in the musical The Rink.

Johnson played Broca, the Cardassian who succeeds Damar in becoming the leader of the Cardassian Union in Star Trek: Deep Space Nine's final two episodes, "The Dogs of War" and "What You Leave Behind". Johnson has also guest starred in The Munsters Today, The Fresh Prince of Bel-Air and The Practice. His other motion picture credits include Off the Mark, American Blue Note, Murder By Numbers, Hideous!, Archibald the Rainbow Painter and In the Shadow of the Cobra.

Johnson served as the creative head of Full Moon Entertainment label Alchemy Entertainment/Big City Pictures. His credits as producer while there include Ragdoll, The Horrible Dr. Bones, Killjoy and The Vault.

== Credits ==
=== Broadway ===
- On the Twentieth Century (1978–1979)
- Eubie! (1978–1979)
- The Rink (1984)
- Rap Master Ronnie (1984)
- Big Deal (1986)
- The Lion King (1997–present)
- Hot Feet (2006)
- Jekyll & Hyde (2013)
- Kiss Me, Kate (2019)

=== Film ===
- Eubie! (1981)
- Off the Mark (1987)
- American Blue Note (1989)
- Murder by Numbers (1990)
- Total Recall (1990)
- Intimate Stranger (1991)
- Hideous! (1997)
- Archibald the Rainbow Painter (1998)
- In the Shadow of the Cobra (2004)

As producer:

- Ragdoll (1999)
- The Horrible Dr. Bones (2000)
- Killjoy (2000)
- The Vault (2000)

=== Television ===
- Gimme a Break! (1985)
- The New Mike Hammer (1986)
- My Two Dads (1988)
- Police Story: The Watch Commander (1988)
- Designing Women (1989)
- Life Goes On (1989)
- The Munsters Today (1991)
- On the Air (1992)
- The Fresh Prince of Bel-Air (1994)
- New York Undercover (1997)
- Liberty! The American Revolution (1997)
- The Practice (1998)
- Sunset Beach (1999)
- Star Trek: Deep Space Nine (1999)
- Sheena (2001)
- Jessica Jones (2018)
- The Terror: Devil in Silver (2026)
