= Getting Away with Murder (web series) =

- Created by: Test Pattern LLC
- Directed by: Bennett Barbakow
- Starring: Gilrbert John; Kian Mitchum; Justin Cotta; John Kerry (actor)|John Kerry; Eric Beck; Kian Mitchum
- Country of origin: United States
- No. of seasons: 1
- No. of episodes: 14

Production
- Running time: Approx. 4 minutes

Original release
- Network: IFC
- Release: November 10, 2008 – February 23, 2009

Getting Away with Murder is an American television and web series, which airs on the IFC in the United States.

Seth Silver, a 25-year-old hit man, is trying to make it in the world as a successful, well-adjusted adult. While he is confident with his job, he struggles to lead a normal life, which is complicated by the fact he still lives with his mother (who thinks he's a veterinarian technician), and he even has a hard time asking a girl on a date.

The show is produced and filmed in California by Test Pattern LLC.

== Episodes ==
No.	Title	Original release date	Prod. code
1	"Meet Seth Silver"	November 10, 2008	101
Introduction to Seth Silver, a young, handsome career driven twenty-something looking to balance his murderous job with his personal life.
2	"Meet Seth Silver"	November 17, 2008	102
Introduction to Seth's relationship with his mother, as she pries into his life as a Vet technician.
3	"High Noon At The Book Nook"	November 24, 2008	103
Seth meets a girl at the book store while running a menial errand for his mother. Seth meets Rex, his obnoxious best friend.
4	"Sharp As A Tack, But Damn Cold"	December 1, 2008	104
Rex and Seth talk about the finer points of being young and getting ladies.
5	"The Good, The Bad, And The Ugly"	December 8, 2008	105
Seth's archnemesis, Pinkie, makes his debut as a sadistic killer.
6	"250 Lbs. Of Pure Yoked Diesel"	December 15, 2008	106
Rex sits at Seth's bedside and shares the story of his "temporary suspension."
7	"The Finkle Payback"	January 5, 2009	107
Rex and Mrs. Silver chat it up while Seth has a few unsettling nightmares.
8	"The Panties"	January 12, 2009	108
A senator is indicted on some pretty nasty charges, and a legal intern is sent to obtain evidence.
9	"Stress Positions"	January 19, 2009	109
The hit men have a business meeting, and Seth brings the group a little present.
10	"She Should Be So Lucky"	January 26, 2009	110
Seth prepares for his date with Lily.
11	"A Date With Lily Part I"	February 2, 2009	111
Lily drops by the house for the date.
12	"A Date With Lily Part II"	February 9, 2009	112
Seth harangues the restaurant host to get the perfect table at the restaurant. Meanwhile, Pinkie lays a nasty trap to help him carry out his murderous plans.
13	"A Date With Lily Part III"	February 16, 2009	113
Seth and Lily get their dinner started, but Seth has to "take a call" and battle a bunch of Japanese thugs.
14	"A Date With Lily Part IV"	February 23, 2009	114
When Lily gets suspicious, Seth faces an important decision. Should he tell Lily about his true self for his one true love?
