= Trent Haaga =

American actor, screenwriter, producer, and director

- Born: 1971 (age 54–55); Los Angeles, California, U.S.
- Occupations: Actor; Screenwriter; Film producer; Film director
- Years active: 1999–present

Trent Haaga (born 1971) is an American actor, screenwriter, producer, and director. He is best known for his work on independent horror films, such as Deadgirl (2008), Cheap Thrills (2013), and 68 Kill (2017).

== Career ==
Haaga came to the attention of the horror community after co-starring in the Troma film Terror Firmer. He went on to fill the role of screenwriter as well as assistant director on the fourth film in the Toxic Avenger series, Citizen Toxie: The Toxic Avenger IV. Due to also playing the leader of the Diaper Mafia in this film, he was forced to direct many scenes in the film while wearing a baby bonnet and an adult diaper. He relates many of these experiences as co-author of the book Make Your Own Damn Movie! written with Lloyd Kaufman of Troma.

He has worked in many aspects of filmmaking (writing, producing, acting) and enjoys them all.

"As a writer or actor you're important to the project, but not indispensable. If you're producing there are fewer battles to fight creatively. But, honestly, I like to make films and am happy to do anything on a film set. I'm happy and flattered that people want me to be in their movies or have shot scripts that I've written."

Haaga works in independent film and has stated that he likes the advances made in digital cinematography.

"Let's make as many as we can right now! History will determine which ones live on, but I can't get enough low budget horror films no matter what."

Haaga has praised the speed of digital filmmaking.

"We shot Killjoy 2, Hell Asylum, and Dead and Rotting in 8 days (each, not all three in 8 days!). The Ghouls shot in 12 days. Suburban Nightmare in 9."

Haaga directorial debut Chop, which stars Will Keenan, Tanishaa Mukherji and Billy Bakshi, was released in 2011. He wrote the script for the independent thriller alongside Adam Minarovich. The movie is a revenge thriller within the tradition of Fargo and Oldboy. Haaga narrated the Indie thriller flick Fetch.

Haaga has also written for video games; he worked on the DLC for the survival horror game The Evil Within and was the lead writer on the game's sequel. The story for The Evil Within 2 was created by the Japanese developers and Haaga was tasked with fleshing out the characters in the game.

== Filmography ==
=== Acting credits ===
Year	Title	Role	Notes
1999	Terror Firmer	Jerry	
1999	Troma's Edge TV	Troma Superstar Trent Haaga	
2000	Citizen Toxie: The Toxic Avenger IV	Tex Diaper	
2001	Mulva: Zombie Ass Kicker!	James 'the Cock God' Vanbrunt	
2002	Killjoy 2: Deliverance from Evil	Killjoy	
2003	The Ghouls	Clift	
2004	Suburban Nightmare	Charles Rosenblad	
2004	Tales from the Crapper	Party Goer	
2005	Knight of the Living Dead	Justin's Dad	
2006	Easter Bunny, Kill! Kill!	Bum/Donald	
2007	Gimme Skelter	Luther	
2007	Black Dahlia Movie: The Elizabeth Short Story	Red/Bobby Manley	
2007	Splatter Disco	Kent Chubb	
2008	Bonnie & Clyde vs. Dracula	Clyde	
2010	Killjoy 3	Killjoy	
2012	Where the Dead Go to Die	Ralph's Dad	
2012	Killjoy Goes to Hell	Killjoy	
2014	The Pact 2	Pink Room Receptionist	
2015	Tales of Halloween	Nelson	
2016	Killjoy's Psycho Circus	Killjoy	
2017	Bad Match	Detective Dean	
2019	Bunker of Blood 07: Killjoys Carnage Caravan	Killjoy	
2019	The Creative Slump	Trent Haaga	Short
2022	An American Masquerade	Bronson	

=== Directing credits ===
- Deathcember (2019)
- 68 Kill (2017)
- Chop (2011)

=== Writing credits ===
- Citizen Toxie: The Toxic Avenger IV (2000) (writer)
- Hell Asylum (2002) (V) (writer)
- Feeding the Masses (2004) (V) (writer)
- Damage Control (2005) TV series (unknown episodes)
- Raving Maniacs (2005) (screenplay)
- Make Your Own Damn Movie! (2005) (book)
- Deadgirl (2008) (writer)
- Poor Things (2008) (screenplay) (story)
- Fetch (2009)
- Cheap Thrills (2013) (writer)
- Killing Mommy (2016) (writer) (TV Movie)
- 68 Kill (2017) (screenplay) (director)
- The Evil Within 2 (2017) (video game) (writer)
- It Came From the Desert (2017) (writer)
- Girl on the Third Floor (2019) (writer)
- Deathcember (writer) (2019) (segment "Operation Dolph)

=== Producer credits ===
- Killjoy 2: Deliverance from Evil (2002) (line producer)
- Dead & Rotting (2002) (producer)
- Hell Asylum (2002) (line producer)
- The Ghouls (2003) (associate producer)
- Easter Bunny, Kill! Kill! (2006) (producer)
- Chop (2011) (producter)
- The Dead Reborn (2013) (producer)
