= Knock 'Em Dead, Kid (film) =

- Directed by: Christopher L. Golon
- Written by: Christopher L. Golon
- Starring: Dirk Julian; Michael Resendez; Chad Post; Cody Cowell; Angela Nordeng; Torey Marks; Erin Prieto
- Cinematography: Shane Greavette
- Edited by: Christopher L. Golon
- Release date: February 3, 2009
- Country: United States
- Language: English

Knock 'Em Dead, Kid is a 2009 American independent film written, co-produced, and directed by Christopher L. Golon. The film stars Dirk Julian, Michael Resendez, Chad Post, Torey Marks, Angela Nordeng, Andrew Chase, Cody Cowell, Les Mahoney, Judy Waller, and Al 'Mr. Outrageous' Burke. Knock 'Em Dead, Kid tells the story of a young man, on his way to college, who makes horrible choices during one fateful summer.

== Plot ==
The film is set during a summer in New Britain, Connecticut and centers on Bret, a 19-year-old who lives with his divorced mother and recently lost his job at an ice cream shop. He wants to attend a film school in New York, but must go through the application and interview process. One evening Bret and his friends Willard and Jim decide to assault Teddy, a man believed to have raped a friend of theirs. Planning to force a confession out of him, the three don masks and jump Teddy but only succeed in knocking him out before fleeing. The assault is investigated by a detective, Krej, who believes that Bret is one of the responsible parties and frequently questions him. It isn't until he is out on a walk with his girlfriend Veronica that Bret begins to realize how serious the repercussions might be for him.

In the following days Bret spends time with a 16-year-old girl he met at a party, Trish, and ends up kissing her in his car, unaware that Veronica witnessed everything. She confronts him the following day and an upset Bret decides to spend time with Willard, who is going to see his crush Angela. Upon seeing her with another man, Willard turns violent and beats both Angela and the man. Still confused, Bret later spends time with Trish and discovers that he's losing interest, particularly as he is still in love with Veronica.

One morning Angela discovers that her car has been vandalized with sexist graffiti. Believing it to be Willard, she reports him to the police and also tells them that he, Bret, and Jim were responsible for Teddy's assault. While he is interviewing with a film school recruiter, Willard is discovered in a car with a local stoner, Andy, and the two are arrested. They are manhandled during the arrest, which is witnessed by onlookers. This results in a minor riot, in which Jim participates. As the riot continues through the night, Bret unsuccessfully tries to reconnect with Veronica, only for her to rebuff him and say that she cannot forgive him. The following morning Bret is arrested by Krej and taken into custody.

In the following weeks Bret is given community service and learns that film school is on indefinite hold. Seeing her son's despondency, Bret's mother tells him that he can still fix his life and that he is, after all, 'alive.' Bret lays down realizing he is fortunate to be alive.

== Cast ==
- Dirk Julian as Bret
- Michael Resendez as Willard
- Torey Marks as Veronica
- Erin Prieto as Trish
- Chad Post as Jim
- Cody Cowell as Detective Krej

== Production ==
Knock 'Em Dead, Kid was shot in Los Angeles, California during the summer of 2008. Golon drew inspiration for the screenplay from his own experiences. He wrote the initial script in 1995 and in some of the subsequent drafts, "the script, which had been 212 pages...began to scale down. And down it went: 165, 140, and finally about 80." The script had numerous titles, like 'Once Upon a Summer in Connecticut' and 'In the End.'

== Release ==
The film was released on February 3, 2009 in Los Angeles, California.

== Reception ==
Richard Propes of The Independent Critic gave the movie a grade of C+, praising the camera work and Golon's riot scene while also criticizing the acting as "a bit hit or miss". Nicholas Sheffo of Fulvue Drive-in rated Knock 'Em Dead, Kid a 6 out of 10, writing that "the teens are still more realistic than most of what Hollywood gives us in bad comedies or phony feel-good films, but the violence is ironically the weak point here.." Felix Vasquez of Cinema Crazed wrote the film had "a gritty realistic sense of direction, dialogue flows from the cast with startling energy. Jay S. Jacobs of Pop Entertainment writes "the film has promise." Brian Skutle of Sonic Cinema gave the film a C− writing "[the] film...just doesn't cut it, however truthful it may want to be to life.

=== Awards ===
- Honorable Mention at the 2009 Twin Rivers Media Festival
