= Marina Blumenthal =

Argentine actress

Marina Blumenthal is an Argentinian actress. Born in Buenos Aires, she began acting and modelling as a young girl. Her roles in Argentina covered: film, television, commercials and stage (winning the A.C.E. award for best actress in a play). Blumenthal has studied theatre, music, dancing, and improvisation.

After being cast in a Latino Sitcom, Blumenthal moved to Los Angeles, where she has had roles in films, and television, as well as modelling, and hosting. Her filmography includes Cuando Volveras, Easter Bunny, Kill! Kill!, and the TV movie Bike Cops Van Nuys. As well as appearing in Telemundo TV series, Blumenthal co-hosts the "Repo Radio Show" with Lou Pizarro, and has appeared in the web comedy series Chamacas, on Sofia Vergara's YouTube Channel. The actress has a number of forthcoming film and television projects.

== Filmography ==
- 1999: El mar de Lucas
- 2003: The Ghouls
- 2003: My First Time (1 episode)
- 2004: Como TV's (TV-Serie)
- 2004: Porno
- 2006: Easter Bunny, Kill! Kill!
- 2008: Cuando volveras
- 2008: The Junkyard Willie Movie: Lost in Transit (Video)
- 2013: Chamacas (TV-Serie)
- 2013: Bike Cops Van Nuys (TV-Movie)
- 2015: Flowers for Monica (Short film)
- 2016: The Potential for Beauty
- 2017: Ataka (Short Film)
- 2017: The Heart of a Woman (Short Film)
- 2019: The Power of Beauty
