= Killjoy 2: Deliverance from Evil =

Killjoy 2
- Release poster
- Directed by: Tammi Sutton
- Written by: Douglas Snaffer; Tammi Sutton
- Produced by: Charles Band; J. R. Bookwalter associate producer: Robert Hall; Trent Haaga
- Starring: Charles Austin; Olimpia Fernandez; Debbie Rochon; Logan Alexander; Jermaine Cheeseborough; Nicole Pulliam; Rhonda Claerbaut; Choice Skinner; Trent Haaga
- Cinematography: Balthazar Jones
- Edited by: Don Adams
- Music by: Jon Greathouse
- Distributed by: Full Moon Features
- Release date: January 8, 2002
- Running time: 77 min.
- Country: United States
- Language: English
- Budget: $30,000

Killjoy 2: Deliverance from Evil is a 2002 American slasher film and sequel to Full Moon's horror movie, Killjoy.

== Plot ==
A young man, Nicholas “Nic” Gordon, is being chased by dirty cops Officer White and Officer Donnelly. They manage to catch him, handcuff him, and plant cocaine on him so they can make the “arrest”. A week later, Nic and four other minor offenders; Raymond “Ray-Ray” Martin, Eddie Jasper, Cecile “CeCe“ Washington and the shy Charlotte Davis, are taken by detention officers Denise Martinez and Lieutenant Harris Redding to “Loxahatchee Canyon”. They are to spend 90 days at the location that’s “200 miles away” where they will be renovating a group home for fellow delinquents. On the way, their bus engine blows stranding them in the middle of nowhere, at night, with no cellphone reception.

Redding takes the three men with him to search for cellphone reception. They happen upon a house and Ray-Ray breaks in when no one answers while Redding climbs a nearby hill in hopes of cell service. A gunshot is heard and Ray-Ray falls through the front door of the house, having taken a shotgun blast to the chest. A redneck local, Lilly, comes out threatening them to leave. She is about to shoot Eddie when Redding shoots her in the head. He tells them to get Ray-Ray back to the van while he searches for a phone. On the way back, they hear another gunshot, warning them that there are more rednecks out there. Believing that Redding is dead, the men quickly head back.

They get back to the van and find they have no medical kit with them. Warning the others about the rednecks, Martinez panics when she learns Redding may be dead and Nic takes her gun. The group leaves into the woods to find help. Eventually, they find another house belonging to voodoo priestess, Kadja Boszo, who tells them she can try to help Ray-Ray with her magic, but if he chooses to stay alive, he'll live, if he chooses to die, he‘ll die. Ce-Ce tells the group a story that her grandmother told her about, an evil spirit named Killjoy, a revenge demon who can be summoned through black magic. A boy named Michael summoned Killjoy but when Michael was killed, Killjoy used him to gain power by taking revenge on Michael’s killers, then destroyed Michael’s soul and disappeared. Nic and CeCe go outside to talk. Nic, intrigued and believing that Killjoy can help Ray-Ray, tells Ce-Ce he’ll give her cocaine if she can bring Killjoy to life.

After the ritual seemingly fails, Nic says the deal’s off, but CeCe offers sex in return for the drugs which Nic agrees to. After having sex, he tells her he actually has no drugs and she leaves angrily. She goes to the outhouse when Killjoy appears and begins terrorizing her from outside the outhouse. Killjoy takes out his teeth, a pair of razor-sharp windup chattering teeth, and shoves them through a slot in the door. He listens and laughs as the teeth tear her to shreds then chatter their way back out where he puts them back in his mouth. Back inside the house, Nic arrives and gets told that Ray-Ray choose not to stay and now he's dead and Boszo took him outside. Martinez worries about CeCe and Nic leaves to find Boszo. Eddie leaves to get water from a water pump and finds CeCe’s mangled body. Killjoy emerges and using his telekinetic powers, lifts Eddie up off the ground and impales him onto the pump. He laughs maniacally while pumping blood from Eddie’s body from the pump.

Boszo, Nic, Martinez, and Charlotte begin to worry when Eddie and CeCe both have not returned. They argue about what to do and Nic leaves angrily when Boszo accuses him and CeCe of summoning Killjoy. Outside, he runs into Killjoy, he shoots him several times but it does nothing. Nic pulls out a knife but Killjoy makes Nic “carve a smile” in his own face, killing him.

Martinez, Charlotte and Boszo begin a voodoo ceremony to defeat Killjoy, blessing several jars of liquid on a table. Boszo and Martinez go into the woods to continue the ceremony where Killjoy slashes Boszo’s throat to stop her ritual and Martinez runs back to the house. Killjoy enters, knocks out Martinez and is ready to kill Charlotte when Redding comes in with a gun distracting him. Charlotte grabs the jars of liquid and splashes it onto Killjoy who screams as his face slowly melts. The next day, Charlotte, Ms. Martinez and Redding are taken out of the wilderness by a ranger.

== Cast ==
- Charles Austin as Nic Gordon, a tough guy arrested by two crooked cops
- Logan Alexander as Lieutenant Harris Redding
- Debbie Rochon as Denise Martinez
- Nicole Pulliam as Cecile “Ce-Ce” Washington, a young woman “fresh out of a 28-day stay, since the womb like mother, like daughter”
- Choice Skinner as Raymond “Ray-Ray” Martin, a young man “came up in the streets with Nic”
- Olimpia Fernandez as Charlotte Davis, “a little, lost girl, started a fire at school, the whole school burned down”
- Jermaine Cheeseborough as Eddie Jasper, a non-threatening young man who “considers himself a crusader for the African-American People; he’ll debate your ear off but he’s pretty harmless. He was just in the wrong place at the wrong time”
- Babalda Francis Cledjo as Security Guard
- Tammi Sutton as Lilly, a hillbilly hermit
- Rhonda Claerbaut as Kadja Boszo, a powerful voodoo priestess
- Trent Haaga as Killjoy, a psychotic demon killer clown
- Devin Hamilton as Ranger
- Wayland Geremy as Officer Donnelly, a crooked cop who arrested Nic
- Bobby Marsden as Officer White, a crooked cop who arrested Nic
- Aaron Brown as File Clerk

== Production ==
The script for Killjoy 2 was written in two weeks, and the film was shot in Los Angeles over the course of eight days with an estimated budget of $30,000.

Angel Vargas turned down the offer to reprise his role and was recast with Trent Haaga, who went on to play Killjoy. Hagga was suggested for the film by fellow cast member Debbie Rochon, who had previously worked with him on Terror Firmer and Citizen Toxie: The Toxic Avenger IV. Initially hired as a producer, Rochon suggested Hagga for the role of Killjoy after Vargas became unavailable, noting that he met most of the physical requirements and was already going to be on set every day anyway. Initially dismissive of the idea, Hagga took the role when he learned it would earn him a $200 raise in his daily pay. Hagga was originally embarrassed by his role in the film but returned in several sequels.

== Release ==
Killjoy 2: Deliverance from Evil was released direct to video on VHS and DVD on January 8, 2002.

== Sequels ==
Three sequels have been released to Killjoy 2: Deliverance from Evil: Killjoy 3 in 2010, Killjoy Goes to Hell in 2012, and Killjoy's Psycho Circus in 2016.
