= Killjoy 3 =

- Release poster
- Directed by: John Lechago
- Written by: John Lechago
- Produced by: Charles Band
- Starring: Trent Haaga; Victoria De Mare; Jessica Whitaker; Michael Rupnow; Spiral Jackson; Oliva Dawn York; Al Burke; Tai Chan Ngo; Darrow Igus
- Music by: Michael Sean Colin
- Distributed by: Full Moon Features
- Release date: December 14, 2010
- Running time: 78 min.
- Country: United States
- Language: English

Killjoy 3 (also known as Killjoy's Revenge) is a 2010 American slasher comedy film and sequel to Full Moon's hit urban horror film, Killjoy. Released in 2010, this film is one of several made by Full Moon Entertainment in an attempt to resurrect old franchises. Other new films included Puppet Master: Axis of Evil and Demonic Toys 2.

== Plot ==
Some time passes and Killjoy is once again called, this time through a blood pact. Immediately he resorts to using the blood spilled by his summoner to create three underlings, which he dubs new evil clowns, Punchy, Freakshow and Batty Boop. However the man does not name a victim for Killjoy, leaving the scene without doing so. This causes Killjoy and his posse to vanish and return to their world.

Meanwhile, a college student named Sandie is watching over her professor's house while he is gone from town, along with her friends Rojer, Erica and Zilla. While fetching the morning newspaper, Rojer finds a sack on the professor's doorstep. He carries it into the house, however Sandie protests against opening it. They decide to uncover the contents that night when Erica and Zilla return, and doing so, they find an ornate mirror which they hang on the professor's wall. That night Zilla inspects the mirror on his own, whereby he is transported to Killjoy's world. Killjoy stages a boxing match between Zilla and Punchy which nearly kills Zilla, however his friends discover his physical body and successfully resuscitate him, rescuing his consciousness from Killjoy's world. Furthermore, a barrier has been placed over the house, trapping the group indoors.

Erica is the next to fall victim to the mirror, and soon enough Killjoy makes his presence known by communicating with the three students through the mirror, beckoning them to join him in his world. He reveals his plan to dine on Erica, and invites the group to his feast. The professor (the man who summoned Killjoy earlier in the film) returns home and is quickly informed of the situation, however he is not surprised, having summoned Killjoy in the first place. Sandie, Rojer, Zilla and the professor enter Killjoy's world through the mirror, and each person faces a different demon. Zilla manages to convince Punchy not to be Killjoy's slave, the professor escapes Freakshow and Rojer is seduced by Batty Boop, while Sandie leads Killjoy on long enough for Boop to jealously confront him. Killjoy berates her for ironically coming onto another man, and then destroys her. The group then fails to save Erica at the dinner, before Killjoy's posse slices her apart on a silver platter. A battle ensues wherein Freakshow is vanquished with salt (which repels evil spirits) by Zilla, Rojer is killed during the encounter by having his head whacked off with a giant mallet by Killjoy and Zilla suggests Punchy take this opportunity to strike back against Killjoy, who slays him for his insolence.

Having allowed the deaths of Erica and Rojer as distractions, the professor finally enacts his plan to say the name Killjoy originally went by in antiquity, in an effort to subdue him. He also reveals himself to be the father of Michael, whose soul Killjoy exploited before destroying. The professor chose not to name a victim while initially summoning Killjoy because the target of his revenge was ultimately Killjoy himself. The clown applauds the professor for his deviousness in using both himself and the students alike to achieve his revenge. Killjoy proclaims that the souls he consumes become a part of him, and the spirit of Michael appears, consoling his father. With the professor's guard down, Killjoy slays him as well by smashing him with the giant mallet. The two survivors, Sandie and Zilla, resort to laughter to quell the clown, but Zilla is killed when Killjoy taunts them while actually trying to be humorous. Sandie continues to laugh at Killjoy while shouting his original name, which incapacitates him long enough for her to return to the mirror and be transported to her world. Killjoy then explodes in a fit of innards. The Magic mirror disappeared from the wall. Sandie is shown to be committed for insanity, having not stopped laughing since the ordeal, and under the suspicion of murdering her friends and the professor.

== Cast ==
=== Evil Clowns ===
- Trent Haaga as Killjoy The Demonic Clown
- Al Burke as Punchy The Clown
- Tai Chan Ngo as Freakshow The Mime Clown
- Victoria De Mare as Batty Boop The Sexy Female Clown

=== Humans ===
- Darrow Igus as The Professor
- Spiral Jackson as Zilla
- Quentin Miles as Michael
- Michael Rupnow as Rojer
- Jessica Whitaker as Sandie
- Olivia Dawn York as Erica

== Production ==
Director John Lechago intentionally moved away from the urban style of the previous two films, stating: “But then I also wanted to take it in the direction of what fans these days want to see, and the first thing I had to do was get rid of the urban thing. I don’t mean any disrespect to the previous guys, but I just really didn’t like it. I felt it was out of date and more like it was taking advantage of a culture and making a mockery of it. Like the ‘urban’ part was really just portraying these young kids as pot smokers and gang members. I know some of these guys, and they’re not like that. So I said that if I’m doing it, there’s no urban to it, and I’m going to have a multicultural cast—or as much as I could get it that way—but still honor Killjoy’s origins.”

Lechago was given the directing job after his earlier work caught the attention of Stuart Gordon, a friend and frequent collaborator of Full Moon founder Charles Band. The film was shot alongside Puppet Master: Axis of Evil at Ace Studios, located in the Nanhai District of Foshan, Guangdong, China.

Initially, it was unclear if Trent Haaga would return as Killjoy, as he had become a successful screenwriter and hadn’t been contacted for the film. In the eight years since Killjoy 2: Deliverance from Evil, Full Moon had lost contact with Haaga. Lechago used his friendship with Hagga as leverage to persuade the company to bring in special effects artist Tom Devlin, after they initially declined and planned to rely solely on their Chinese crew. After hearing about the project from Devlin, Haaga wasn’t interested. He was slightly embarrassed by his previous role in Killjoy 2 and disliked the makeup process. He eventually agreed to return after learning the film would be shot in China, seeing it as an opportunity to travel to a country he had never visited.

Three deleted scenes from the film were reused in a recap montage in the sequel Killjoy Goes to Hell. The scenes go by quickly, so the only way to see them is to play the footage in slow motion. The first scene shows the shaman outside the living room window as Sandie and Rojer clean up, but when Rojer senses his presence and turns, the shaman is gone. The second one takes place shortly after that, where Rojer is making advances towards Sandie in bed, but she turns him down. The third one occurs when Killjoy tries to get the mirror to work, where he calls technical services and appears to get into a heated argument with the operator, but Batty calms him down. Why these scenes were removed and not included in a deleted scenes section is unknown.

== Sequels ==
Two sequels have been released to Killjoy 3: Killjoy Goes to Hell in 2012 and Killjoy's Psycho Circus in 2016.
