= Tattoo Nightmares =

- Genre: Reality television
- Created by: SallyAnn Salsano
- Directed by: Lucas Kenna Mertes
- Theme music composer: Michael Baiardi
- Country of origin: United States
- Original language: English
- No. of seasons: 3
- No. of episodes: 59

Production
- Executive producers: SallyAnn Salsano; Joel Zimmer; Sheonna Mix; Jacob Walker; Brad Kreisberg
- Producers: Sean Hogan; Adjani Vivas
- Editors: Ken Abraham; M.J. Ben Eisele
- Running time: 60 minutes

Original release
- Network: Spike
- Release: 16 October 2012 – 1 September 2015

Related
- Tattoo Nightmares Miami; Tattoo Fixers

Tattoo Nightmares is an American reality television series based in North Hollywood that broadcast on Spike from October 16, 2012. The series showcase the horror stories behind the public's unfortunate tattoos and the tattoo artists attempts to fix them. The cast include Big Gus, Jasmine Rodriguez and Tommy Helm.

== International broadcasts ==
Tattoo Nightmares aired in the UK and Ireland on the TV channel truTV.
