= Outrageous 911 =

- Genre: Reality television
- Country of origin: United States
- Original language: English
- No. of seasons: 1
- No. of episodes: 14

Production
- Running time: 22 minutes
- Production company: Mike Mathis Productions

Original release
- Network: TLC
- Release: December 14, 2013 – November 5, 2014

Outrageous 911 is an American reality television series that premiered on the TLC cable network, on December 14, 2013. The series features some of the strangest and oddest calls to police during mishaps and accidents.

== Episodes ==
No.	Title	Original release date
1	"Locked Inside My Car"	December 14, 2013
2	"They Made My Burger Wrong"	January 25, 2014
3	"CPR on a Bear"	September 24, 2014
4	"TP-Emergency"	September 24, 2014
5	"Big Flies and Missing Chickens"	October 1, 2014
6	"The Mailman is Drunk"	October 1, 2014
7	"Black Magic and Burritos"	October 8, 2014
8	"Scuba Diving in a Pond"	October 8, 2014
9	"The Mean Lady Next Door"	October 15, 2014
10	"Kid in the Vending Machine"	October 15, 2014
11	"Tiger in My Backyard"	October 22, 2014
12	"Trapped Under a Buffalo Head"	October 29, 2014
13	"Naked Truck Push"	November 5, 2014
14	"Asleep on the Toilet"	November 5, 2014
