= Killjoy Goes to Hell =

2012 comedy horror film by Full Moon

- Release poster
- Directed by: John Lechago
- Written by: John Lechago
- Produced by: Charles Band
- Starring: Trent Haaga; Victoria De Mare; Tai Chan Ngo; Al Burke; John Karyus; Stephen Cardwell; Jason Robert Moore; Cecil Burroughs; Randy Mermell; Ian Roberts; Jim Tavaré and Jessica Whitaker
- Cinematography: Brandon Rossy
- Edited by: John Lechago
- Music by: Michael Sean Colin
- Distributed by: Full Moon Features
- Release date: October 6, 2012
- Running time: 92 min.
- Country: United States
- Language: English
- Budget: $85,000

Killjoy Goes to Hell (also known as Killjoy 4) is a 2012 American black comedy slasher film and the fourth installment in the Killjoy series of movies by Full Moon.

A sequel titled Killjoy's Psycho Circus was released in 2016 alongside the release of Evil Bong High-5!.

== Plot ==
The film begins in a deserted snowy desert-esque level of Hell. An Old Hag living in a dusty shack is being paid a prize by a Bailiff for conjuring up Killjoy. After Killjoy is summoned, the Bailiff appears and chokes Killjoy out. Killjoy wakes up in an electric chair and is tortured while being asked if he pleads innocent or guilty.

Meanwhile, on Earth, it's been three years since the events of the previous film, and Sandie is still locked up in the Essex County Mental Asylum and is still questioned by Detective Grimley and Detective Ericson about the missing bodies of Zilla, the Professor, Rojer and Erica. She only responds with laughter, and Doctor Simmons informs the detectives that her brain is always in the stage of laughter, and cannot figure out what is causing her to do this, but from the evidence in the Professor's house, and his relationship with Michael from the first film, Detective Ericson believes that the legend of Killjoy might be real after all.

Meanwhile, the Bailiff takes Killjoy into an elevator that transports them to another level of Hell that looks like a spaceship in deep space, where the courtroom is under Beelzebub's control. Killjoy is on trial for the crime of being too soft and not scary, as he let his last victim, Sandie, escape from his realm. The accuser is Jezabeth, the Devil's Advocate, who was once in a relationship with Killjoy a while ago before he dumped her.

Killjoy is found guilty and is stripped of his malice buffoon and his powers. In Hell Jail, he meets Skid Mark, a human demonic clown who idolizes Killjoy, but has a secret agenda to take his position. He offers to become Killjoy's attorney, and with what little human blood he has left, conjures up Punchy, Freakshow (who is missing his little brother), and Batty Boop, who still has a grudge at Killjoy for vaporizing her. She recognizes Skid Mark, but can't remember him.

In the first court hearing, the trio are brought to the stands and questioned by Jezabeth, but everything goes to Hell (no pun intended) as Punchy only speaks Polari, Freakshow is a mime, and Batty Boop gets Killjoy to apologize to her in front of everyone, not to mention Skid Mark's failure as an attorney. Because of this, nearly half of Killjoy's fifty-three names are crossed out by Scribe, the court's stenographer, which makes Killjoy weaker and erases them from existence.

Back on earth, Detective Ericson and Doctor Simmons begin to notice that the Professor's evidence on Killjoy is disappearing, and they can't remember them either. They decide to meet up with Detective Grimley and Sandie back at the Asylum to discuss what's going on.

Meanwhile, in Hell, Punchy begins to organize a revolt against the court with the rest of the demonic clowns to help Killjoy, and Freakshow goes to the Old Hag's to find materials for a new bionic brother when he notices she has a magic mirror, but is only granted access to it if he sleeps with her. He brings the materials back to Batty Boop, who conjoins him a new brother and tells her about the mirror, and Batty Boop decides to help Killjoy by entering the mirror to Earth and bringing Sandie to Hell to prove Killjoy guilty.

Batty tracks down Sandie's location and she and Freakshow enter the mirror and end up in the asylum, where the detectives have arrived to talk to Doctor Simmons. Security Guard Jim is tasked to bring Sandie to meet with the detectives, but Freakshow kills Jim, and Batty kills Detective Grimley when he arrives to investigate Jim's prolonged absence. Sandie tries to escape but Batty catches her and pushes her into the mirror. Doctor Simmons finds Jim dead along with Sandie's straitjacket, thinking she has escaped. Simultaneously, Freakshow attacks Detective Ericson and is about to kill him, but is summoned back to Hell, leaving him behind wounded and scared.

Back in Hell, Beelzebub takes Killjoy to the elevator and takes him to Oblivion, the Final Circle of Hell, an area of nothing, to show him where he'll be for the rest of eternity if he loses. He also leaves out a box on the desk in the courtroom for Killjoy, which he claims is insurance if Killjoy wins.

The next court hearing, Killjoy fires Skid Mark out of anger and decides to represent himself. Batty brings Sandie to the stands, in clown mode, and Sandie recaps the events to Jezabeth. Killjoy asks Sandie how she felt afterwards, and goes into vivid detail on what Killjoy did, convincing Beelzebub that he is in fact evil. The only thing left to convince him is the Trial of Combat, where Killjoy has to fight to the death with an opponent, which is Skid Mark.

Batty Boop recognizes Skid Mark as one of her victims, who roofied her and raped her, leaving behind only one 'love bite' on him: an infection. Skid Mark turns into a monster, and claims whoever wins gets to keep Batty. An unnamed Clown Observer hands Killjoy a bag of tricks, compliments of Punchy and the clowns, which is ineffective. Batty hands the malice to Sandie, informing her that if Killjoy loses, she won't be able to get out of Hell. Sandie hands Killjoy his malice, allowing him to crush Skid Mark's head off.

The Clowns revolt in the courtroom, where Batty kills Jezabeth and Punchy kills Bailiff. Beelzebub, in a fit of anger, uses his powers to send himself, Scribe and everyone in the entire room out, except for Punchy, Freakshow, Sandie, Batty and Killjoy. Killjoy opens the insurance box, revealing a button. Killjoy presses the button, which initiates a self-destruct sequence to blow up Hell in a minute. The group escapes in the elevator up to Earth, where the clown posse turn on Sandie, and begin pursuing her in the streets.

== Additional footage ==
During Sandie's recap of Killjoy 3, there are three scenes shown in the montage that are not in the final cut of the previous film. These scenes go by fast, so the only way to see them is to play the montage slow motion and analyze each scene closely. The first scene shows the shaman outside the living room window as Sandie and Rojer clean up, but when Rojer senses his presence and turns, the shaman is gone. The second one takes place shortly after that, where Rojer is making advances towards Sandie in bed, but she turns him down. The third one occurs when Killjoy tries to get the mirror to work, where he calls technical services, and appears to get into a heated argument with the operator, but Batty calms him down. Why these scenes were cut out or not left in a deleted scenes section is unknown.

== Cast ==
=== Evil Clowns ===
- Trent Haaga as Killjoy The Demonic Clown
- Victoria De Mare as Batty Boop The Sexy Clown
- Al Burke as Punchy The Clown
- Tai Chan Ngo as Freakshow The Mime Clown
- John Karyus as Skid Mark The Clown
- Daniel Del Pozza as Dirty The Clown
- Derek Jacobsen as Dreadlock The Clown
- Vincent Bilancio as Tramp The Clown
- Nakai Nelson as Switchblade Sinister The Clown / Voice of Destruction
- David Cohen as Clown Observer
- Leroy Patterson as Hillbilly Hobo The Clown / Monster Skid Mark
- Tim Chizmar as White Face The Clown
- Denzil Meyers as Harlequin The Clown

=== Devils ===
- Stephen F. Cardwell as Beelzebub
- Samantha Holman as Court Observer
- Mindy Robinson as Red Devil Girl
- Jenny Allford as Blue Devil Girl
- Aqueela Zoll as Jezabeth
- Jim Tavaré as Scribe
- Juan Patricia as Exploded Observer
- Ian Roberts as Bailiff
- Lisa Goodman as Old Hag

=== Humans ===
- Jessica Whitaker as Sandie
- Cecil Burroughs as Detective Grimley
- Jason Robert Moore as Detective Ericson
- Randy Mermell as Dr. Simmons
- Raymond James Calhoun as Security Guard

== Production ==
The film was shot in seven days on a budget of $85,000.

== Release ==
The film was released on October 6, 2012 in the USA, and was eventually released under the title Killer Clown In the United Kingdom in 2013.

== Sequel ==
In 2016, Charles Band announced a Kickstarter Campaign to help fund the two films Killjoy's Psycho Circus and Evil Bong High-5!
