= New Life Network =

New Life Network is an international producer and distributor of television programs and feature films, founded in 1989. NLN distributes for producers worldwide, with a special focus on films and programs that it deems deserving, but less likely to get distribution because of geographic origin.

== Films ==
Productions include:

- The Puzzle Factory - PuzzleFactoryMovie.com [USA] - in production
- Church in Disaster - [USA] - in post production
- Hope - [Germany] - in production
- Pastor’s Wife - [UK]
- Clan C - [Kenya]

The network is currently distributing Sabina K. a Bosnian film by Cristóbal Krusen which had its world premiere in 2015 Sarajevo Film Festival, the Indian short Kamlaa from director Jim Sanjay. and Long Road Ahead from Syria.

== History ==
The first international distribution took place in the Soviet Union in 1990 before the breakup of the nation into its current individual parts, including Russia, Ukraine, Kazakhstan, Belarus and other relatively new countries.

This was followed up in the early 90s by distribution in Poland, Lithuania, Latvia, and other former Eastern bloc nations.

Since then distribution has spread into other Eastern European regions and former USSR countries, followed by success in China, Mongolia, and Francophone Africa, where it has representatives in Mali, Benin, Togo, Cameroon and Congo (RDC), and the Middle East. Additional results have been in Cuba, Nepal, and Nigeria.

New in 2013 are the countries of Pakistan, India and Indonesia.
