= The Bill Collector =

- Film poster
- Directed by: Cristóbal Krusen
- Written by: Cristóbal Krusen
- Produced by: Kenneth Altman; Matthew Kinne; Cristóbal Krusen; Douglas B. Maddox; Lorna Ray; Jason Richards
- Starring: Danny Trejo; Gary Ray Moore; Brandon Hardesty; Elizabeth Omilami; Tom Ohmer; David Krusen; Kera O'Bryon; Ron Kenoly
- Cinematography: Dave Selle
- Edited by: Sarah Krusen; Sam Wallwork
- Distributed by: Pure Flix Entertainment
- Release date: September 3, 2010
- Running time: 93 minutes
- Language: English

The Bill Collector is a family drama film featuring Danny Trejo and written and directed by Cristobal Krusen.

== Plot ==
When Lorenzo Adams, a top bill collector at Lump Sum Collections, finds out that a dangerous man named Uncle Frankie has tracked Lorenzo to Norfolk, Virginia and is coming to collect money that Lorenzo has owed him for a few years, he finds no one to help but Pastor Kevin and desperate down-and-outers from an inner city mission; who serve as unwitting pawns in Lorenzo's scam to pay Frankie back.

== Cast ==
- Danny Trejo as Frankie Guttierez
- Gary Ray Moore as Lorenzo Adams
- Ron Kenoly as Pastor Kevin
- Brandon Hardesty as Iggy
- Elizabeth Omilami as Wanda
- Tom Ohmer as Stan Davenport
- David Krusen as Omar
- Kera O'Bryon as Ramona
- Tamara Johnson as Therese

== Production notes ==
Filming took place in Hampton Roads and Norfolk, Virginia.
