= Mr. Brooks =

- Directed by: Bruce A. Evans
- Written by: Bruce A. Evans; Raynold Gideon
- Produced by: Jim Wilson; Kevin Costner; Raynold Gideon
- Starring: Kevin Costner; Demi Moore; Dane Cook; William Hurt; Marg Helgenberger; Ruben Santiago-Hudson; Danielle Panabaker
- Cinematography: John Lindley
- Edited by: Miklos Wright
- Music by: Ramin Djawadi
- Production companies: Metro-Goldwyn-Mayer Pictures; Relativity Media; Eden Rock Media; Tig Productions; Element Films
- Distributed by: MGM Distribution Co.
- Release date: June 1, 2007
- Running time: 120 minutes
- Country: United States
- Language: English
- Budget: $20 million
- Box office: $48.1 million

Mr. Brooks is a 2007 American psychological thriller film directed by Bruce A. Evans starring Kevin Costner, Demi Moore, Dane Cook, and William Hurt. The film follows the eponymous character, a celebrated Portland businessman and serial killer (Costner) who is forced to take on a protégé (Cook) after being blackmailed, and has to contend with his bloodthirsty alter ego (Hurt) who convinces him to indulge his "habit". His life grows even more complicated when a driven police officer (Moore) reopens the investigation into his murders. Mr. Brooks was released by MGM Distribution Co. on June 1, 2007. The film received mixed reviews and grossed $48.1 million against a $20 million budget.

== Plot ==
Earl Brooks, a respected businessman in Portland, Oregon, leads a secret life as a serial killer. Despite his effort to curb his "killing addiction," Brooks succumbs to his id, Marshall, and kills a young couple in their bedroom. As part of his psychopathology, Brooks leaves each victim's bloody thumbprint on a lampshade, an act that spawned the nickname the "Thumbprint Killer". He follows a meticulous modus operandi, including fastidious preparation, cleansing the crime scene, posing the bodies, locking doors before departing, and even reciting the Serenity Prayer to help himself calm down. Brooks realizes later that the bedroom curtains were open during the murder, the open window facing an apartment building.

Portland Police Homicide Detective Tracy Atwood is on the case, having trailed the Thumbprint Killer for a number of years. During her investigation she finds out that another serial killer that she previously caught, Thornton Meeks aka The Hangman, has escaped from prison and has vowed to kill her.

Brooks's daughter, Jane, unexpectedly arrives home and asks for a job at his company, having dropped out of college. Later, Brooks learns that Jane is pregnant. Soon after, Brooks and his family are visited by Palo Alto detectives investigating a murder in Jane's former campus dorm. Brooks realizes that Jane committed the murder. He briefly considers allowing her to be caught to "save her" from becoming like him. He changes his mind and commits a similar murder in Palo Alto to provide Jane with an alibi.

A man calling himself "Mister Smith" approaches Brooks. Having a direct view of the murdered couple's bedroom, Smith took pictures of Brooks's crime as it happened. He demands to accompany Brooks during a murder. Brooks reluctantly agrees, warning Smith that killing can become addictive.

Detective Atwood interviews Smith and several other residents living across from the latest crime scene. Brooks learns that Atwood, in addition to being stalked by The Hangman, is undergoing a difficult divorce from her husband, Jesse Vialo. He decides that Vialo and his lawyer/lover, Sheila, will be Smith's first victims. At the scene of the Vialo murder, Smith wets his pants.

Leaving the scene, Smith holds Brooks at gunpoint in panic. Brooks admits to being suicidal, having found his urges irrepressible. At a cemetery, Brooks tells Smith to kill him and dispose of his body in an open grave, sparing his family the shame of his crimes. Smith pulls the trigger. However, Brooks had previously tampered with the gun on the off-chance that he changes his mind. Brooks, deciding he wants to live and see his grandchild, kills Smith and hides his body in the open grave.

With the photos already destroyed, there is no evidence tying Brooks to the crimes. As Smith's urine is the only DNA evidence tied to the Thumbprint Killer, the investigation is off Brooks's trail. Brooks also cleaned out Smith's apartment, intentionally leaving behind a moving company receipt with a new address written on it. Atwood goes to this address and finds herself face-to-face with The Hangman and his girlfriend. A shootout ensues, ending when Atwood wounds Meeks, forcing him to murder his girlfriend and then commit suicide.

A few days later Brooks anonymously calls Detective Atwood, whom he has come to admire. The brief conversation makes Atwood suspect Smith is not the Thumbprint Killer. That night, Brooks has a nightmare in which Jane murders him. After his wife wakes him up, he lies in bed reciting the Serenity Prayer.

== Cast ==
- Kevin Costner as Earl Brooks/The Thumbprint Killer
- Demi Moore as Detective Tracy Atwood
- Dane Cook as Graves Baffert/Mr Smith
- William Hurt as Marshall, Brooks's alter ego.
- Marg Helgenberger as Emma Brooks
- Ruben Santiago-Hudson as Detective Hawkins
- Danielle Panabaker as Jane Brooks
- Aisha Hinds as Nancy Hart
- Lindsay Crouse as Captain Lister
- Jason Lewis as Jesse Vialo
- Reiko Aylesworth as Sheila
- Matt Schulze as Thornton Meeks/The Hangman
- Yasmine Delawari as Sunday
- Traci Dinwiddie as Sarah Leaves
- Michael Cole as Atwood's lawyer
- Laura Bailey as flight attendant

== Reception ==
=== Box office ===
Mr. Brooks opened in 2,453 theaters and grossed $10,017,067, with an average of $4,083 per theater and ranking #4 at the North American box office. The film ultimately grossed $28,549,298 domestically and $19,572,602 internationally for a total of $48,121,900 worldwide, above its $20 million budget.

=== Critical response ===
Mr. Brooks received mixed reviews from critics. On review aggregator Rotten Tomatoes it has a score of 56% based on 158 reviews with an average rating of 5.7/10. The sites critical consensus states "The set-up is intriguing, but Mr. Brooks overstuffs itself with twists and sub-plots, becoming more preposterous as it goes along." Costner and Hurt were both praised for their performances. On Metacritic the film has a score of 45 out of 100 based on 34 critics indicating "mixed or average" reviews. Audiences polled by CinemaScore gave the film an average grade of "B−" on an A+ to F scale.

Peter Travers of Rolling Stone wrote that "the cop on the case, [is] played by Demi Moore with a striking directness that deserved better than being saddled with an absurd back story as an heiress with a fortune-hunting husband."

== Home media ==
The film was released on Blu-ray and DVD on October 23, 2007.

== Soundtrack ==
Mr. Brooks: Original Motion Picture Soundtrack

Film score by Ramin Djawadi
- Released: May 22, 2007
- Genre: Soundtrack
- Length: 51:01
- Producer: Ramin Djawadi

Ramin Djawadi chronology
Beat the Drum (2003)	Mr. Brooks: Original Motion Picture Soundtrack (2007)	Prison Break (2007)

The film score for Mr. Brooks was composed by Ramin Djawadi. The soundtrack album was released on May 22, 2007.

The film's soundtrack features Ramin Djawadi's score and the song "Vicious Traditions" by The Veils. Ramin Djawadi was nominated for the World Soundtrack Award in category Discovery of the Year in 2007.

No.	Title	Length
1.	"One Last Question"	0:43
2.	"Vicious Traditions" (by The Veils)	4:46
3.	"Regrets of an Artist"	2:08
4.	"The Thumbprint Killer"	4:44
5.	"Addiction"	2:43
6.	"Hallway Burial"	2:03
7.	"Detective Atwood"	2:24
8.	"Unwelcome Partner"	3:16
9.	"Suicide Note"	3:05
10.	"Decision"	5:01
11.	"Meet Meeks"	3:42
12.	"Her Story"	2:24
13.	"Are We Alone"	1:38
14.	"Realization"	1:42
15.	"A Clue"	3:35
16.	"Mr. Brooks"	3:31
17.	"Graveyard Standoff"	3:36
Total length:		51:01

== Sequels ==
On the director's commentary, Bruce Evans said that the film was to be the first of a trilogy, but as with any franchise it depended on the film's profits. Despite its commercial success, there are no plans to make further films. Speaking in April 2009, Panabaker said, "Everybody wanted to make a trilogy. I saw Kevin [Costner] last summer and we still would love to. The idea of my character and Kevin's character, it'd be so much fun. I think you got to see how manipulative they both are with each other. I would have loved to have done three."

Speaking with Jason Jenkins at Bloody Disgusting in 2020, Evans further elaborated on what the follow-ups might have entailed. "'Someone would have kidnapped his family, having no idea who they were dealing with,' Evans notes, pointing out that the kidnappers would not only be contending with the murderous Brooks, but his burgeoning psychopath of a daughter as well." Evans noted that Brooks's id Marshall would have returned, and have been "killed" by Brooks at some point in the second film, eventually being resurrected and returning “angrier and more perverse”. Furthermore, Evans revealed that the third film, which would have found Brooks and Jane at odds with one another, would have ended with Brooks killing both himself and his daughter, having realized that there is no hope for either of them.
