= Concordia Preparatory School (Maryland) =

Location
- Towson, Maryland; United States; 39°24′20″N 76°34′12″W

Information
- Former name: Baltimore Lutheran School
- Type: Private
- Motto: All to the Glory of God
- Religious affiliation: Lutheranism
- Denomination: Lutheran Church–Missouri Synod
- Established: 1965; 61 years ago
- Grades: 6–12
- Gender: Coeducational
- Enrollment: 341
- Campus: Suburban
- Colors: Red and white chrome
- Mascot: Saints
- Website: concordiaprepschool.org

Concordia Preparatory School (CPS) is a co-educational parochial secondary school serving grades 6-12. Originally known as Baltimore Lutheran School, the school is located in Towson, Maryland, United States. CPS is operated by the Baltimore Lutheran High School Association, Inc., an association of Lutheran churches in the Baltimore area.

== Religious background ==
Concordia Preparatory School is affiliated with the Lutheran Church–Missouri Synod (LCMS). A majority of the faculty and staff are members of the LCMS. Chapel and religion classes are taught from a Lutheran Christian point of view. However, Concordia Prep accepts students from a wide variety of Christian faith backgrounds.

== History ==
Land for the school's campus was purchased in 1951, and the school opened in 1965 as Baltimore Lutheran School. In 2014, the name was changed to Concordia Preparatory School as part of an effort to increase its visibility and enrollment.

In 2022, a federal district judge ruled in Buettner-Hartsoe v. Concordia Preparatory School that although the school is a 501(c)(3) nonprofit charitable organization and exempt from federal and state taxes, it is a recipient of federal funds and thus subject to Title IX regulations. The ruling, if affirmed by higher courts, would have had major impacts on most U.S. independent schools, but the Court of Appeals for the Fourth Circuit overturned it in 2024.

== Curriculum ==
Concordia Preparatory School offers a Christian college preparatory curriculum.

== Campus ==
The campus sits on twenty-five acres (10 ha) situated in a residential area next to the Baltimore Beltway (I-695). There are two classroom buildings, and an activity center which contains the gymnasium, cafeteria, and band room.

There are two athletic fields. The lower field was replaced with Sportexe synthetic turf in the summer of 2005, and is used for soccer, football, lacrosse, and baseball. The upper field is natural grass and is used for field hockey and softball. A Field House was completed in the summer of 2007 which was used as a practice facility for several sports. The field house collapsed due to snow accumulation on its roof in 2016.

== Sports ==
Concordia Prep's sports teams compete in the MIAA and the IAAM, private school leagues in northern Maryland. Both girls' and boys' teams are referred to as the Saints.

Fall sports: boys' football (varsity), boys' soccer (varsity, junior varsity, middle school), girls' soccer (varsity, middle school), girls' volleyball (varsity, junior varsity), girls' field hockey (varsity, junior varsity), boys' cross country (varsity, middle school), girls' cross country (varsity, middle school), girls' tennis (varsity), cheerleading (middle school, junior varsity, and varsity).

Winter sports: boys' basketball (varsity, junior varsity, middle school), girls' basketball (varsity, junior varsity, middle school), boys' wrestling (varsity, middle school), girls' indoor soccer (varsity), cheerleading (middle school, junior varsity, and varsity).

Spring sports: boys' baseball (varsity, middle school), girls' softball (varsity, middle school), boys' track (varsity, middle school), girls' track (varsity, middle school), boys' lacrosse (varsity), girls' lacrosse (varsity), boys' tennis (varsity).

CPS teams have won several recent conference championships including: girls' track, girls' lacrosse, boys' soccer, girls' basketball, girls' indoor soccer, football, and baseball. The boys' varsity lacrosse team has also won three consecutive championship titles (2009-2011). The girls' varsity lacrosse team won the 2011 IAAM lacrosse championship. In 2018 and 2019, the boys’ soccer team won the B-Conference Championship. They have also won the 2021 and 2023 football B championship MIAA.

== Notable alumni ==
- Brandon Hardesty - movie/TV actor, gained fame through YouTube

== See also ==
- Harford Lutheran School
