= Famous in Love =

2017 American drama television series

- Genre: Drama
- Based on: Famous in Love by Rebecca Serle
- Developed by: I. Marlene King; Rebecca Serle
- Starring: Bella Thorne; Charlie DePew; Georgie Flores; Carter Jenkins; Niki Koss; Keith Powers; Pepi Sonuga; Perrey Reeves
- Composer: Michael Suby
- Country of origin: United States
- Original language: English
- No. of seasons: 2
- No. of episodes: 20

Production
- Executive producers: Dan Farah; Christopher Fife; Miguel Arteta; I. Marlene King
- Producers: Tawnya Bhattacharya & Ali Laventhol; Hynndie Wali
- Cinematography: Larry Reibman
- Camera setup: Single-camera
- Running time: 38–42 minutes
- Production companies: Long Lake; Carmina Productions; Farah Films; Warner Horizon Television

Original release
- Network: Freeform
- Release: April 18, 2017 – May 30, 2018

Famous in Love is an American drama television series that premiered on Freeform on April 18, 2017, and is based on the novel of the same name by Rebecca Serle. The series stars Bella Thorne, Charlie DePew, Georgie Flores, Carter Jenkins, Niki Koss, Keith Powers, Pepi Sonuga, and Perrey Reeves. On June 29, 2018, Freeform announced that it had cancelled the series after two seasons.

== Plot ==
Paige Townsen, a college student, gets a role after auditioning for the starring role in a Hollywood film and must now navigate her new life and chemistry with her co-lead and her best friend.

== Cast and characters ==
=== Main ===
- Bella Thorne as Paige Townsen, a young and beautiful college student who gets cast in the movie adaptation of a blockbuster book series called Locked, which causes her life to change overnight. She is in a love triangle with Jake (Charlie DePew), her longtime crush, and Rainer (Carter Jenkins), her co-star in Locked.
- Charlie DePew as Jake Salt, a down-to-earth guy from the Midwest with an edge who aspires to be a screenwriter and an indie filmmaker. He is Paige's best friend and one of her love interests. Charlie DePew replaced Jesse Henderson in the role from the original pilot.
- Georgie Flores as Cassandra "Cassie" Perkins, Paige's roommate and best friend. Later, she becomes the girlfriend of Adam.
- Carter Jenkins as Rainer Devon, the son of famous producer Nina Devon, and, as later revealed, Alan Mills. He is labeled the "sexiest man alive", and is a famous actor. He has a complicated friendship with Jordan Wilder and soon develops a romantic interest in Paige Townsen.
- Niki Koss as Alexis Glenn, Rainer's old friend who competes for the same role as Paige. She is secretly bisexual.
- Keith Powers as Jordan Wilder, a troubled star who lands the role of the other point in the movie's famous love triangle. He and Rainer are best friends but have a complicated history which is further heightened by the fact that both share a past with Tangey.
- Pepi Sonuga as Tangey Turner, a pop star with a controlling mother. She was sleeping with Jordan Wilder while dating Rainer Devon, which creates tension between the two men.
- Perrey Reeves as Nina Devon, Rainer's smart and cunning mother. Confident and manipulative, she will do whatever it takes to make sure things go her way.

=== Recurring ===
- Jason Antoon as Wyatt, the original director of the movie adaptation of Locked, who leaves the production on the film during its two-month hiatus (season 1)
- Katelyn Tarver as Rachael Davis, former Broadway actress and Alexis's love interest (season 1)
- Nathan Stewart-Jarrett as Barrett, an entertainment and gossip reporter whose beat is Hollywood (season 1)
- Tanjareen Martin as Brandy (season 1)
- Shawn Christian as Alan Mills, the head of the film studio producing the movie who is later revealed to be Rainer's biological father
- Vanessa Williams as Ida, Tangey's mother and manager
- Tom Maden as Adam, a production assistant on the movie and Cassie's boyfriend
- Danielle Campbell as Harper, a former child star whom Rainer meets in rehab and with whom he quickly becomes involved (season 2)
- Claudia Lee as Billy, an actress working as a waitress whom Jake hires to replace Paige as the lead on his independent film (season 2)
- Sofia Carson as Sloane, the best friend of Alexis (season 2)
- Rob Estes as Sloane's father and love interest of Nina Devon (season 2)

== Production ==
=== Development ===
Freeform, then known as ABC Family, had picked up the pilot for fast-track development on March 19, 2015. The pilot was shot in November 2015; Freeform greenlit the pilot on April 7, 2016, and shooting began on July 13, 2016, and wrapped up on October 19, 2016. On November 18, 2016, Freeform announced that the series would premiere on April 18, 2017. Freeform also released the entire season for viewing online on April 18, 2017. The series is based on the novel of the same name, written by Rebecca Serle. Serle worked with I. Marlene King to develop the novel into a television series. Freeform renewed the series for a second season on August 3, 2017. The table read for the second season started on October 30, 2017. The second season premiered on Freeform on April 4, 2018.

On June 26, 2018, it was reported that Freeform had decided to cancel the series after Hulu declined to contribute more money towards the production of a third season. Clashes between actress Bella Thorne and showrunner I. Marlene King were also cited as part of the reason for the cancellation; however, these statements were dismissed by King on her Twitter account. On June 29, Freeform officially cancelled the series.

=== Casting ===
Romeo Miller was cast as Pablo $$ in a recurring role for the second season. Sofia Carson appeared in multiple episodes of the second season as Sloane, the daughter of a movie mogul.

== Episodes ==
=== Series overview ===
Season	Episodes	Originally released	
Season	Episodes	First released	Last released
1	10	April 18, 2017	June 13, 2017
2	10	April 4, 2018	May 30, 2018

=== Season 1 (2017) ===
The entire first season was released on digital platforms, such as OnDemand, the Freeform App and website, and Hulu, on April 18, 2017.

No. overall	No. in season	Title	Directed by	Written by	Original release date	U.S. viewers (millions)
1	1	"Pilot"	Miguel Arteta; Tawnia McKiernan	Story by : Rebecca Serle; Teleplay by : I. Marlene King and Rebecca Serle	April 18, 2017	0.65
Ordinary college student Paige has her world turned upside down as she gets her big break after auditioning for the starring role in a Hollywood blockbuster. She must now navigate her new star-studded life and the highs and lows that come with being the new It-Girl in town, as well as balancing her college workload. As her public profile continues to rise and the undeniable chemistry with her new co-star and Hollywood heartthrob Rainer Devon grows, the more her friendships are strained with her two best friends – particularly Jake, who may be more than just her friend.
2	2	"A Star Is Torn"	Norman Buckley	I. Marlene King & Christopher Fife	April 25, 2017	0.39
On the eve of the big “Locked” cast announcement party, Paige is more nervous about telling her parents the truth about snagging her dream role than the actual event. With her parents set on her education taking priority, she tries to find a way to convince them – and herself – that she can do both. Meanwhile, the gossip is still swirling about Rainer and Jordan’s fight over Tangey, and Nina is determined to shut it down so it won’t hurt the film.
3	3	"Not So Easy A"	Michael Goi	Tawnya Bhattacharya & Ali Laventhol	May 2, 2017	0.30
Having promised her parents that she would be able to balance school and the film’s schedule, Paige quickly learns that it is easier said than done. While trying to work on a crucial school paper, she keeps getting sidetracked with wardrobe fittings, photo shoots and screen tests. Leaning on Jake and Cassie for help, Paige quickly learns she may be in over her head. Meanwhile, Nina must make cuts to the movie budget, and Jake meets with an agent about his script.
4	4	"Prelude to a Diss"	Mary Lou Belli	Rebecca Serle	May 9, 2017	0.28
Paige is determined to prove to everyone she can succeed, especially Alexis; but when everything seems to go awry on her first day on set, her confidence is shaken. And to make matters even stickier, Rainer asks Paige out on a date making her question if she wants to become the Hollywood cliché of dating her co-star or not. Meanwhile, Cassie resorts to desperate measures to pay her tuition bill, and Tangey clashes with her mother over Tangey’s career.
5	5	"Some Like It Not"	Tanya Hamilton	William H. Brown	May 16, 2017	0.21
Paige's 21st birthday and all she wants to do is celebrate with her two best friends, but her friendship with Jake is still on the rocks after his getaway with Alexis. Rainer surprises everyone when he throws Paige a surprise birthday party, but things don't turn out as expected when Jake arrives late. Meanwhile, Jordan and Tangey renew their relationship in secret; Tangey is tired of controlled by her momager and fires back.
6	6	"Found in Translation"	Ron Lagomarsino	Kateland Brown	May 23, 2017	0.26
Nina and Rainer take a last-minute trip to China to rescue Locked from a new setback, which derails Rainer's weekend plans with Paige. But when Alan and Rainer bond over their mutual tastes, Nina feels uncomfortable. Cassie's financial problems continue, so she feels forced to take more shifts as a topless maid. Meanwhile, Jordan deals with issues involving his mother.
7	7	"Secrets & Pies"	Roger Kumble	Miguel Ian Raya	May 30, 2017	0.29
Thinking it would help Cassie's financial problems, Paige offers her a job as her assistant. When Cassie declines, issues in their friendship are revealed. Plus, Jake starts to learn the realities of what it means to sell a script in Hollywood, and Alexis embraces her role as Producer on the project. Meanwhile, Jordan's problems continue to mount as he learns Brandy needs more money, and Barrett Hopper reveals to him that he knows the truth about his and Brandy's past.
8	8	"Crazy Scripted Love"	Geary McLeod	Tawnya Bhattacharya & Ali Laventhol	June 6, 2017	0.33
Paige and Cassie's fight is impacting Paige's performance, and when Jake is too busy to help, Rainer offers his own advice. Later, Jake's career takes an unexpected turn. Meanwhile, when Alan and Rainer spend some time together, Nina grows concerned. On top of her worries, she's facing a possible lawsuit, and she agrees to help Jordan with his mother's issues. Rainer surprises Nina with a helpful solution, but her happiness is short-lived when her worst fears about Alan and Rainer are confirmed.
9	9	"Fifty Shades of Red"	Susanna Fogel	Christopher Fife & William H. Brown	June 13, 2017	0.36
Paige deals with Jake's impending move to Austin, and a revelation about Cassie fractures their friendship. Meanwhile, Rainer starts searching for his real father, but he's thrown into a tailspin after he puts the pieces together. Later, Jordan tries to mend his relationship with Tangey, who feels betrayed by his secret. But when he shares information about his past, she considers forgiving him.
10	10	"Leaving Los Angeles"	Elizabeth Allen Rosenbaum	Melissa Carter	June 13, 2017	0.23
Rainer's downward spiral continues, and Paige searches for him after he disappears. Plus, Alexis receives bad news, and she takes revenge on Rachel. Jake briefly returns to Los Angeles, and Paige tries to confess her feelings. Meanwhile, Jordan attempts to handle the Barrett Hopper problem with an exclusive, but a shocking event stops the plan. Later, Nina stages a press conference to address Rainer's public meltdown, but things are disrupted by an unexpected appearance.

=== Season 2 (2018) ===
No. overall	No. in season	Title	Directed by	Written by	Original release date	U.S. viewers (millions)
11	1	"The Players"	Roger Kumble	I. Marlene King	April 4, 2018	0.29
12	2	"La La Locked"	Roger Kumble	Melissa Carter	April 4, 2018	0.19
13	3	"Totes on a Scandal"	Ron Lagomarsino	Tawnya Bhattacharya & Ali Laventhol	April 11, 2018	0.26
Things are looking up for Cassie as she books an important audition and for Tangey, who has a business proposition for Pablo $$.
14	4	"The Kids Aren't All Right"	Geary McLeod	Bryan M. Holdman	April 18, 2018	0.21
Alexis receives a very cold shoulder from everyone on set after her reality show’s scandalous reveal; A "Backsplash" cast reunion brings back some old feelings and creates new tensions; Paige finds the perfect replacement for Jake's movie, but is later distressed when she finds out that Jake and his new star might be getting too close.
15	5	"Reality Bites Back"	Paula Hunziker	John Webb & Garth Mueller	April 25, 2018	0.26
16	6	"The Goodbye Boy"	Melanie Mayron	Kateland Brown	May 2, 2018	0.25
As “Locked” wraps production, the cast looks to the next steps in their careers, while Jake and Cassie also have to make decisions about their future. Jordan continue his Oscar campaign press tour with a stop at “Good Morning America.”
17	7	"Guess Who's (Not) Coming to Sundance?"	Troian Bellisario	Bryan M. Holdman	May 9, 2018	0.32
Paige and Jake continue to feel further apart as Jake and Billy head to a film festival, while Paige stays in LA for a big interview and cover photo shoot. Meanwhile, Jordan has to deal with the fallout from his recent revelation and Nina takes part in a bidding war for a highly-wanted film script.
18	8	"Look Who's Stalking"	Anna Mastro	Tawnya Bhattacharya & Ali Laventhol	May 16, 2018	0.24
Paige works with police to help find her stalker, while Pablo $$ starts to show a new side to Tangey and Alexis makes a decision that lands her in hot water.
19	9	"Full Mental Jacket"	Norman Buckley	Kateland Brown	May 23, 2018	0.30
Paige and Rainer head to NYC to promote “Locked,” but after everything that has happened, Paige realizes that fame isn’t all that she expected. Meanwhile, Jordan is under a lot of stress and Cassie struggles with her relationship with Adam.
20	10	"The Good, The Bad and The Crazy"	Norman Buckley	Melissa Carter	May 30, 2018	0.22

== Broadcast ==
The second season returned with a two-hour premiere on Freeform on April 4, 2018. It aired in Canada on E! on April 8, 2018, with new episodes set to air every Sunday.

In the United Kingdom, it airs exclusively on Amazon Prime Video with new episodes every Thursday.

In Spain, it airs exclusively on HBO Spain with new episodes every Thursday.

== Ratings ==
Viewership and ratings per season of Famous in Love
Season	Episodes	First aired		Last aired		Avg. viewers (millions)	18–49 rank
Season	Episodes	Date	Viewers (millions)	Date	Viewers (millions)	Avg. viewers (millions)	18–49 rank
1	10	April 18, 2017	0.65	June 13, 2017	0.23	0.33	TBD
2	10	April 4, 2018	0.29	May 30, 2018	0.22	0.25	TBD

=== Season 1 (2017) ===
Viewership and ratings per episode of Famous in Love
No.	Title	Air date	Rating/share (18–49)	Viewers (millions)
1	"Pilot"	April 18, 2017	0.3	0.65
2	"A Star is Torn"	April 25, 2017	0.2	0.39
3	"Not So Easy A"	May 2, 2017	0.1	0.30
4	"Prelude to a Diss"	May 9, 2017	0.1	0.28
5	"Some Like it Not"	May 16, 2017	0.1	0.21
6	"Found in Translation"	May 23, 2017	0.1	0.26
7	"Secrets & Pies"	May 30, 2017	0.1	0.29
8	"Crazy Scripted Love"	June 6, 2017	0.2	0.33
9	"Fifty Shades of Red"	June 13, 2017	0.1	0.36
10	"Leaving Los Angeles"	June 13, 2017	0.1	0.23

=== Season 2 (2018) ===
Viewership and ratings per episode of Famous in Love
No.	Title	Air date	Rating/share (18–49)	Viewers (millions)
1	"The Players"	April 4, 2018	0.1	0.29
2	"La La Locked"	April 4, 2018	0.1	0.19
3	"Totes on a Scandal"	April 11, 2018	0.1	0.26
4	"The Kids Aren't Alright"	April 18, 2018	0.1	0.21
5	"Reality Bites Back"	April 25, 2018	0.1	0.26
6	"The Goodbye Boy"	May 2, 2018	0.1	0.25
7	"Guess Who's (Not) Coming to Sundance?"	May 9, 2018	0.1	0.32
8	"Look Who's Stalking"	May 16, 2018	0.1	0.24
9	"Full Mental Jacket"	May 23, 2018	0.1	0.30
10	"The Good, the Bad and the Crazy"	May 30, 2018	0.1	0.22

== Nominations ==
Year	Award	Category	Nominee(s)	Result	Ref.
2017	Teen Choice Awards	Choice Breakout TV Show	Famous in Love	Nominated	
2017	Teen Choice Awards	Choice Drama TV Actress	Bella Thorne	Nominated	
2017	Teen Choice Awards	Choice Drama TV Show	Famous in Love	Nominated	
2018	Teen Choice Awards	Choice Drama TV Actress	Bella Thorne	Nominated	
2018	Teen Choice Awards	Choice Drama TV Show	Famous in Love	Nominated	
