= American Pie Presents: The Book of Love =

2009 film by John Putch

- DVD cover
- Directed by: John Putch
- Written by: David H. Steinberg
- Based on: Characters by Adam Herz
- Produced by: Mike Elliott
- Starring: Bug Hall; Brandon Hardesty; Kevin M. Horton; Beth Behrs; Jennifer Holland; John Patrick Jordan; Rosanna Arquette; Eugene Levy
- Cinematography: Ross Berryman
- Edited by: John Gilbert
- Music by: David Lawrence
- Production companies: Capital Arts Entertainment; Universal Studios Home Entertainment
- Distributed by: Universal Studios Home Entertainment
- Release date: December 22, 2009 (United States)
- Running time: 96 minutes
- Country: United States
- Language: English

American Pie Presents: The Book of Love is a 2009 American sex comedy film directed by John Putch. It is the fourth installment in the American Pie Presents film series, a spin-off of the American Pie franchise. The film stars Bug Hall, Brandon Hardesty, Kevin M. Horton, Beth Behrs, Jennifer Holland, John Patrick Jordan, Rosanna Arquette, and Eugene Levy, and centers around three high school virgins who find the infamous Book of Love and try to use it to have sex.

The film was released direct-to-DVD in the United States on December 22, 2009, by Universal Studios Home Entertainment. It grossed $5.2 million in DVD sales. This was Sherman Hemsley's final film appearance before his death on July 24, 2012.

== Plot ==
In East Great Falls, Michigan, high-schooler Rob masturbates with a peanut butter sandwich. His dog attempts to eat it and his younger brother Cody films the ordeal, uploading it to YouTube.

At school, an embarrassed Rob meets his fellow virgin friends Nathan and Marshall "Lube"; and Nathan reveals that his girlfriend Dana has pledged to abstain from sex until marriage, despite having already slept with several people. Classmate Scott Stifler threatens to make a move on Heidi, Rob's crush, and Lube has a vivid fantasy about cheerleader Ashley. Rob and Heidi meet in the library where she reveals a desire to lose her virginity as soon as possible.

At the school dance, Nathan offends Dana when he expects sex after giving her cunnilingus in the car. Rob attempts to tell Heidi his feelings for her but is interrupted by Nathan and Lube, and eventually finds her in the library about to have sex with another student. Shocked, Rob drops a lit tiki torch, starting a fire and setting off the sprinklers.

The next day, while Rob and Heidi are cleaning the library for detention, he finds "The Bible", a legendary sex manual compiled by students over forty years, now damaged by the water.

Testing a tip from the book, Rob approaches Ashley in a lingerie store and compliments her. She leads him into a changing room, shows her breasts, and shoves some panties down his pants, telling him to shoplift them for her. He is caught and forced to pay for them with his mother's credit card.

At Dana's church service, Nathan accidentally broadcasts their intimate conversation to the entire congregation over the PA system, so her father forbids her to see him. Rob's mother confronts him about the credit card charge, and his sarcastic reply that he likes wearing women's underwear is filmed by Cody, who again posts the embarrassing footage online.

At a school basketball game, Rob is again unable to tell Heidi how he feels. Following a page in the book, Rob and his friends visit a very experienced Canadian prostitute. Lube misread that the entry was written in 1975, and the friends are disgusted to meet the now elderly Monique, who dies while performing fellatio on Rob, so the panicked boys drive home.

Rob finally tells Heidi he has feelings for her, and she reciprocates, agreeing to meet later at Stifler's party. There, Heidi is hurt overhearing Rob shout, "Tonight, I'm getting laid!". Lube propositions Ashley but she turns him down. Her friend takes him up on his guarantee of sexual satisfaction, but storms out after finding an offensive text on his phone. Nathan tries to reconcile with Dana but offends her again.

Rob finds Heidi in bed with Stifler, so begins drinking heavily. He declares that "only assholes get laid!" and behaves crudely to a random girl, who promptly takes him to bed but he vomits on her back before they can have sex. The next morning, his mother shows him a video she received of the incident.

Rob and his friends resolve to find all the book's original contributors starting with its creator, Noah Levenstein, and eventually succeed in recreating the damaged pages.

On the school ski trip Katie, whom Stifler had been avoiding, is upset she lost her virginity to him. She defeats him at strip poker, forcing him to apologize and go outside naked, where he is sodomized by a moose. Afterward, he bonds with a sympathetic Imogen. Nathan has sex with Dana in the ski lift control room, accidentally shutting off the power.

Stuck in the lifts, Rob and Heidi reconcile and kiss, and Lube falls off. Ashley climbs down to him, and is moved to tears when Lube explains how he really feels about her. Heidi and Rob return to the cabin and have sex, and Lube and Ashley do the same.

Rob, Nathan, and Lube return the newly restored Bible to its hiding place in the library, after Rob has added his own signature. Cody finds an online video of himself putting a vacuum cleaner on his penis which, to his horror, has been viewed almost 10 million times. Rob appears in the video, broadcasting his revenge.

== Cast ==
- Bug Hall as Robert "Rob" Shearson, a high school virgin who is romantically interested in Heidi and finds the Book of Love
- Brandon Hardesty as Marshall "Lube" Lubetsky, a social outcast who has a crush on Ashley
- Kevin M. Horton as Nathan Jenkyll, Dana's boyfriend who attempts to have sex with her
- Beth Behrs as Heidi, a virgin who is trying to have sex
- Melanie Papalia as Dana, Nathan's girlfriend who is attempting to be abstinent from sex until marriage
- Jennifer Holland as Ashley Lawrence, a cheerleader and the subject of Lube's crush
- John Patrick Jordan as Scott Stifler, a womanizer who is popular and hosts many parties
- Louisa Lytton as Imogen
- Eugene Levy as Noah Levenstein, the creator of the Book of Love
- Sherman Hemsley as Pastor
- Curtis Armstrong as Pete O'Donnell
- Jim Wynorski as Eddie
- Rosanna Arquette as Madeline Shearson
- Cindy Busby as Amy
- Nico McEown as Cody, Rob's younger brother who posts embarrassing videos of him on the Internet

Cameo appearances

- Kevin Federline as Canadian Border guard
- Dustin Diamond as alumnus guy #1
- C. Thomas Howell as alumnus guy #2
- Christopher Knight as alumnus guy #3
- Tim Matheson as Carlito (alumnus guy #4)
- Steve Railsback as alumnus guy #5
- Robert Romanus as alumnus guy #6
- Bret Michaels as himself

== Soundtrack ==
1. "Oh Yeah" by Yello
2. "Something in Your Mouth" by Nickelback
3. "Sexy Little Thing"/"Miss Cindy" by The High Decibels
4. "Smoke Alarm" by Freddy Rawsh
5. "Hot N Cold" by Katy Perry
6. "Dance, Dance" by Fall Out Boy
7. "Turn It Down" by Sideway Runners
8. "Hypnotik" by Roobie Breastnut
9. "Beer" by Ace Baker
10. "How Do I Know" by Wanda Bell
11. "When You Want Some Uh Uh" by Nio Renee Wilson
12. "Get Loose (NipJoint Remix)" by Quanteisha
13. "Pauline" by The High Lonesome
14. "Katmandu" by Sam Morrison
15. "1969" by Dr. Hollywood
16. "Body Language" by Isaac Hayes
17. "If Something's Wrong" by Aidan Hawken
18. "Damned If I Do Ya (Damned If I Don't)" by All Time Low
19. "Hot Mess" by Cobra Starship
20. "Are You Ready" Crash! Boom! Bang!
21. "Got Me Some Love" by Keely Hawkes
22. "Army Girl" by The Genders
23. "Obsession" by Ace Baker
24. "Something Wild" by The High Lonesome
25. "Burnin' Love" by Travis Tritt
26. "Laid" by Aidan Hawken
27. "She Can Dance" by Billy Trudel
28. "Monday" by Mikey and the Gypsys
29. "In It for You" ("Catch My Fall") by The Elliots
30. "Heartbeats" by Melinda Ortner
31. "Say Yes" by Elliott Smith
32. "Book of Love" by Powderfinger
33. "Sinner" by Big B featuring Scott Russo
34. "Mouth to Mouth" by Kaya Jones

== Reception ==
Andre Dellamorte of Collider wrote, "I can't hate on a film like this for the very fact that it is the fourth direct to video sequel to the American Pie films. If you didn't know what you were getting when you walked in the door, then who's really to blame?". In his review for IGN, R. L. Shaffer said the film series has lost the original film's "thoughtful and heartfelt tone", and, although this film attempts to bring some of that back, it is "too little too late". David Nusair of Reel Film Reviews gave the film 1.5 out of 4 and called it "...a typically low-rent and flat-out needless straight-to-video endeavor".
