= Georgie Flores =

American actress

- Occupation: Actress
- Years active: 2008–present

Georgie Flores is an American actress. She is best known for playing Cassandra Perkins in the drama series Famous in Love and Callie Reyes in the comedy drama film Dumplin'.

== Career ==
Her most famous film role so far has been playing Callie Reyes in the comedy drama film Dumplin'. In March 2025 it was announced that she was cast to appear in a reboot of Prison Break. She is also expected to play a leading role in the upcoming drama series More.

== Filmography ==
=== Film ===
Year	Title	Role	Notes
2017	The Feminist	Porge	Short
2017	Small Talk	Violet	Short
2018	Dumplin'	Callie	
2019	Cactus Bot	Clem	Short
2020	Kappa Kappa Die	Shauna	

=== Television ===
Year	Title	Role	Notes
2008	CSI: Miami	Magdalena Branco	Episode; Won't Get Fueled Again
2010	Big Time Rush	Pretty Girl#4	Episode; Big Time Dance
2010	CSI: Crime Scene Investigation	Alisa Santiago	Episode; House of Hoarders
2013	CSI: NY	Laura Palmer	Episode; Blood Actually
2017-2018	Famous in Love	Cassandra Perkins	20 episodes
2019	Into the Dark	Eve	Episode; Uncanny Annie
2025	Chicago Med	Renne Robinson	Episode; Together One Last Time
