= Final Solution (2001 film) =

2001 film by Cristobal Krusen

- Directed by: Cristóbal Krusen
- Written by: Cristóbal Krusen
- Produced by: Gary Wheeler
- Starring: John Kani; Jan Ellis; Langley Kirkwood; Vusi Kunene; Mpho Lovinga
- Cinematography: Mike Downie
- Edited by: Patricia Corona
- Music by: Tom Gire; John Sponsler
- Distributed by: Messenger Films
- Release date: 2001
- Running time: 106 minutes
- Countries: South Africa; United States
- Languages: English; Afrikaans
- Budget: 2.50

Final Solution is a 2001 film written and directed by Cristóbal Krusen. Set in South Africa during the early 1990s, the film is based on the real-life stories of Gerrit Wolfaardt and Moses Moremi. In the film, Wolfaardt is committed to peace and forgiveness between white and black South Africans, while wrestling with his past as a violent proponent of apartheid. He is confronted by Moremi, a victim of Wolfaardt’s former violence, who doubts the sincerity of Wolfaardt’s transformation.

The title of the film is drawn from the Final Solution of Nazi Germany, a program for the Holocaust, embraced by Wolfaardt as the last, best hope to keep South Africa racially pure.

The film was shown at multiple film festivals.

== Plot ==
In 1993, one year before South Africa's first-ever non-racial general election, violence intensifies in Langa Township between white and black paramilitary groups. In contrast, Rev. Peter Lekota leads an interracial church service in Langa in opposition to the mutual suspicion and hatred in South African society. Lekota invites Gerrit Wolfaardt, an Afrikaner, to speak at the service. Gerrit has his heart set on making peace between blacks and whites in his country. He is accompanied by his wife, Celeste.

Moses Moremi brings his uncle to the service. Moses himself is skeptical that blacks and whites can ever live together, however he stays when he sees Gerrit in the church and learns that Gerrit is to be the main speaker for the evening. Moses appears shocked and angry, but his reasons are not clear.

That same night, a paramilitary group of white terrorists makes a hit-and-run attack in the township and meets with unexpected resistance from an underground unit of black resistance fighters led by Edward. Jan Oosthuiszen, the leader of the group, escapes in the ensuing violence. The next morning, Jan flees to Lekota’s church, pleading for sanctuary. An angry mob gathers outside to bring Jan to vigilantism, but Lekota insists that Jan only be turned over to the authorities. To placate the crowd, Gerrit speaks up, telling them that he is the one they are really seeking, and he will tell them why if they listen to him. Intrigued, the fighters lay aside their weapons and enter the church.

Gerrit tells his own history, beginning with his grandfather, an Afrikaner guerrilla fighter, who was executed by the British Army during the Second Boer War. Gerrit explains how he was raised by his father and church to venerate his language, Afrikaans along with his Afrikaner heritage and believing that the Afrikaners were God's chosen people. Anglo-South Africans were to be distrusted and blacks were to be feared.

Gerrit tells of his search for identity as a teenager, and how his role model became Adolf Hitler. This led to him reading Mein Kampf and, with his friend Jan, starting the violently anti-black Youth Party. Catching the eye of local politician Hans Gerber, Gerrit was encouraged in his genocidal ambitions. He concocted a plan for a "final solution" to the swart gevaar ("black menace”) that called for corralling the black population into townships and bombing them.

Hearing this, the fighters are outraged, but are calmed by Celeste who stands and speaks about how she met Gerrit, and how he changed. Celeste meets Gerrit at university and challenges him to read Alan Paton’s Cry, The Beloved Country. Additionally, she brings Gerrit to meet Lekota. In that meeting, Lekota exposes Gerrit’s flawed, white supremacist understanding of Christianity, revealing how the Bible instead teaches that all humanity descends from “one blood”.

Soon after, Gerber assigns Gerrit to assassinate Lekota. Gerrit agrees, but is conflicted. The night of the assassination, he positions himself in the woods near the house where Lekota is preparing to lead a Bible study and aims his sniper rifle at Lekota's heart. Gerrit, however, cannot bring himself to pull the trigger. He walks over to the house and confesses to Lekota, crying in Lekota and Celeste's arms.

When Celeste and Gerrit finish telling their story, Moses stands and addresses the congregation, revealing that he was once physically beaten within an inch of his life by Gerrit and his friends in their youth. Moses is not inclined to forgive and now confronts Gerrit with the memory of the savage attack, and of other injustices perpetrated against his family by the South African military. At this point, Jan emerges from hiding and lashes out at the congregation. He rejects Gerrit as a “traitor,” but is soon restrained and taken into custody. Gerrit sits with Moses and asks for forgiveness. Encouraged by Lekota, Moses slowly reaches toward Gerrit’s hand, beginning a hoped-for journey of reconciliation.

The film concludes with footage of the real Gerrit Wolfaardt and Moses Moremi spending time together and in prayer.

== Cast ==
- John Kani as Rev. Peter Lekota
- Jan Ellis as Gerrit Wolfaardt
- Vusi Kunene as Edward
- David S. Lee as Jan Oosthuizen (as David Lee)
- Liezel van der Merwe as Celeste Wolfaardt
- Mpho Lovinga as Moses Moremi
- Marcel van Heerden as Col. Koornhoff
- Regardt van den Bergh as Hans Gerber
- Marius Weyers as Gert Wolfaardt
- Bruce Marchiano as Jake
- Gino Mingo as Gino
- Lakita Garth as Sheryl Brown
- Chris April as Uncle Sam
- Rob van Vuuren as Hennie Terblanche
- Andrew Faure as Chad Fourie
- Langley Kirkwood as Pieter
- Michael Aldous as Young Gerrit
- Alain de la Querra as Teenage Gerrit

== Inspiration ==
Krusen said that the idea for making a film in South Africa first came to him in 1988 during the filming of Ropa Nueva para Felipe in Mexico. He made numerous trips to South Africa between 1990 and 1994 to observe race relations in the country firsthand and seek material for a story that would demonstrate radical transformation from hatred to love between former enemies.

== See also ==
- Apartheid Films
- Cry, The Beloved Country
- National Party (South Africa)
- Afrikaner Weerstandsbeweging
