= John Patrick Jordan =

American actor

- Occupation: Actor
- Years active: 2003–present

John Patrick Jordan is an American actor. He had a main role as Rob McCall on the Fox web series Prison Break: Proof of Innocence (2006).

He is best known for his starring role as Larnell in the Evil Bong film series (2006–2022). His other starring roles in films include American Pie Presents: The Book of Love (2009) and The Warrant: Breaker's Law (2023). Jordan had a recurring role as Earl Denton on the Amazon Prime show Them (2021).

== Career ==
Jordan had a main role as Rob McCall on the Fox web series Prison Break: Proof of Innocence (2006). He had a starring role as Scott Stifler in the sex comedy film American Pie Presents: The Book of Love (2009).

In 2020, Jordan was cast in the western film Boon, which was released in 2022.

== Filmography ==
=== Film ===
Year	Title	Role	Notes
2003	One of Them	Trey	
2004	Dr. Moreau's House of Pain	Eric Carson	
2005	Believers Among Us	Jason	
2006	The Wailer	Andrew	
2006	Evil Bong	Larnell	
2007	Rushers	Alpha President	Short film
2008	Cinco de Mayo	Bryan	Short film
2009	Evil Bong 2: King Bong	Larnell	
2009	American Pie Presents: The Book of Love	Scott Stifler	
2009	Porky's Pimpin' Pee Wee	Tommy	
2011	Evil Bong 3D: The Wrath of Bong	Larnell	
2011	Beach Bar: The Movie	Steve "Brewski" Brewster	
2012	Lucy in the Sky with Diamond	John	
2013	Gingerdead Man vs. Evil Bong	Larnell	
2015	Evil Bong 420	Larnell	
2016	Evil Bong: High 5	Larnell	
2016	Dog Eat Dog	Officer Jack	
2016	Killjoy's Psycho Circus	Larnell	
2018	Eruption: LA	Bennett	
2018	A Christmas Switch	Alex Samson	Television film
2019	Flashout	Matthew	
2020	Mank	Best Original Screenplay Announcer	
2022	Boon	Pryce	
2022	Evil Bong 888: Infinity High	Larnell	
2023	The Warrant: Breaker's Law	Rufus McGillicuddy	
2025	The Accountant 2	Gerald	
2025	Bad Man	Wayne	
2026	Speed Demon	Gabriel	
2026	I Play Rocky	Martin Kessler	

=== Television ===
Year	Title	Role	Notes
2003	Days of Our Lives	College Boy	Episode: "9503"
2004	Passions	Young Guy #2	2 episodes
2006	Prison Break: Proof of Innocence	Rob McCall	Main role; 19 episodes
2007	Viva Laughlin	Greg	Episode: "What a Whale Wants"
2007	CSI: Miami	Frat Boy #1	Episode: "Sunblock"
2007	Cold Case	Red Buckley '63	Episode: "Boy Crazy"
2008	Mad Men	Eugene	Episode: "Flight 1"
2010	Dark Blue	Frat Guy	Episode: "High Rollers"
2013	Supah Ninjas	Thief	Episode: "Flint Forster" Credited as Patrick Jordan
2016	Workaholics	Bro Plastic Surgeon	Episode: "Wolves of Rancho"
2016	Young & Hungry	Conrad	Episode: "Young & Lottery"
2016	Rush Hour	Austin	Episode: "Familee Ties"
2016	Stan Against Evil	Neal	Episode: "Let Your Love Groan"
2016	Pitch	Davis Cecil	Episode: "Unstoppable Forces & Immovable Objects"
2017	Scorpion	Salesman	Episode: "Sci Hard"
2018	Alex, Inc.	Harley	Episode: "The Mother-in-Law"
2018	General Hospital	Peyton Mills	2 episodes
2019	If Loving You Is Wrong	Officer Duncan	4 episodes
2019	Hawaii Five-0	Ben Miller	Episode: "Ho'okahi no la o ka malihini"
2019	The Morning Show	Tom	Episode: "That Woman"
2020	Little Fires Everywhere	Kyle	Episode: "Seventy Cents"
2021	Them	Earl Denton	Recurring role (season 1); 5 episodes
2022	Law & Order: Special Victims Unit	Tom Nolan	Episode: "Silent Night, Hateful Night"
2023	Wolf Pack	Officer Trent Miller	Episode: "Origin Point"
2024	NCIS: Hawai'i	Brock Overton	Episode: "Into Thin Air"
2024	Landman	Ian Crowley	Episode: "The Sting of Second Chances"
2026	Spider-Noir	Interrogator	Episode: "Betrayal"
