= 7 Minutes (2014 film) =

2014 film by Jay Martin

- Directed by: Jay Martin
- Written by: Jay Martin
- Produced by: Jacob Aaron Estes; Jim Hart; Lorenzo P. Lampthwait; Jacob Mosler; Rick Rosenthal
- Starring: Luke Mitchell; Jason Ritter; Leven Rambin; Zane Holtz; Kevin Gage; Brandon Hardesty; Joel Murray; Kris Kristofferson
- Cinematography: Noah Rosenthal
- Edited by: Kayla Emter
- Music by: Tomandandy
- Production company: Whitewater Films
- Distributed by: Starz Distribution
- Release dates: October 26, 2014 (Austin Film Festival); July 26, 2015 (United States)
- Running time: 92 minutes
- Country: United States
- Language: English

7 Minutes is a 2014 American crime thriller drama film, written and directed by Jay Martin and starring Luke Mitchell, Jason Ritter, Leven Rambin, Zane Holtz, Kevin Gage, Brandon Hardesty, Joel Murray and Kris Kristofferson. It follows three high school friends, who are forced to commit a brazen robbery which quickly goes horribly wrong. It received its world premiere on October 26, 2014 at the Austin Film Festival, and then premiered at the Sarasota Film Festival on April 16, 2015. The film received a limited release and through video-on-demand on June 26, 2015 by Starz Distribution.

== Plot ==
Three friends, Sam (Luke Mitchell), Mike (Jason Ritter) and Owen (Zane Holtz), all showing off in real life, are forced to commit a brazen robbery. What begins as a simple plan - 'in and out in seven minutes' - quickly becomes a dangerous game of life and death as complications arise. As each minute of the robbery unfolds, the stakes are pushed higher and higher. In the final act, Sam's pregnant girlfriend Kate is kidnapped, escalating the situation even further and pressing the trio to do whatever they can to make it out alive.

== Cast ==
- Luke Mitchell as Sam
- Jason Ritter as Mike
- Leven Rambin as Kate
- Zane Holtz as Owen
- Kris Kristofferson as "Mr. B"
- Russell Hodgkinson as Lawrence
- Joel Murray as Uncle Pete
- Kevin Gage as "Tuckey"
- Chris Soldevill as Doug
- Brandon Hardesty as Jerome
- Mariel Neto as Brandi

== Production ==
Filming primarily took place at several locations in Everett, Washington, United States in May 2013. The film used extras from local communities, including the Everett High School and Cascade High School football teams for an overnight shoot in Arlington, Washington. The production also leased police cars and other vehicles from the Everett city government for several scenes.

== Release ==
The film has its world premiere at the Austin Film Festival on October 26, 2014. The film then premiered at the Sarasota Film Festival on April 16, 2015. In January 2015, Starz Digital Media acquired the North American rights. The film was finally released in the US with a limited release and through video-on-demand on June 26, 2015. It was released on DVD and Blu-ray by Anchor Bay Entertainment on September 1, 2015.

== Critical response ==
7 Minutes received negative reviews from film critics. On Rotten Tomatoes, a review aggregator website, it received a 19% approval rating and an average rating of 3.7 out of 10, based on 13 critics. On Metacritic, it holds a rating of 35 out of 100, indicating "generally unfavorable" reviews based on 9 critics.

In a positive review, Linda Bernard of the Toronto Star gave the film 3 out of 4 stars stating "A solid score and tight camerawork shows Martin's background as a music video director translates well to big-screen work." Jesse Hassenger of The A.V. Club gave the film a C−, saying "though 7 Minutes does offer an impressive array of backstories for a film that initially appears to be about three semi-interchangeable guys, most of those backstories are still dominated by clichés".

In a more negative review, Rex Reed of The New York Observer gave the film one star out of four, commenting "like most of today's young directors who neither want to nor know how to tell an actual story in a traditional way with a beginning, middle and end, writer-director Jay Martin jumps around like a spastic colon."
