= Douglas B. Maddox =

American film producer

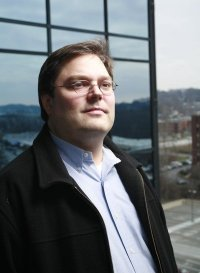
- Douglas B. Maddox
- Born: Douglas B. Maddox; Manassas, Virginia, United States
- Citizenship: United States
- Education: Towson University
- Occupation: Producer
- Years active: 1990–present

Douglas B. Maddox (born in Manassas, Virginia, USA) is an American film producer, executive producer, and production manager. Douglas Maddox was inducted into the Producers Guild of America in July 2007 and has since served as the National Capital Chair. Now he holds the position of Chair Emeritus. He is best known for producing the film, The Bill Collector, starring Danny Trejo and Undaunted, an award-winning biopic on the early life of author and speaker Josh McDowell.

== Producers Guild of America ==
Douglas Maddox started the National Capital Chapter of the Producers Guild where he holds the position of Chair Emeritus of that chapter.

== Filmography ==
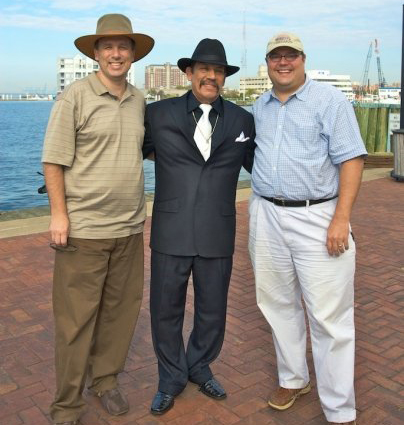
Danny Trejo and Douglas Maddox on the set of The Bill Collector

- The Pizza King (2008) – executive producer, producer
- The Bill Collector (2010) – Executive Producer, Producer
- Undaunted... The Early Life of Josh McDowell (2012) – executive producer, producer

== Documentaries ==
- Discoveries of Israel (2009) – producer, director
- City of David (2010) – producer, director
