= Brandon Hardesty =

American comedic performer & actor (born 1987)

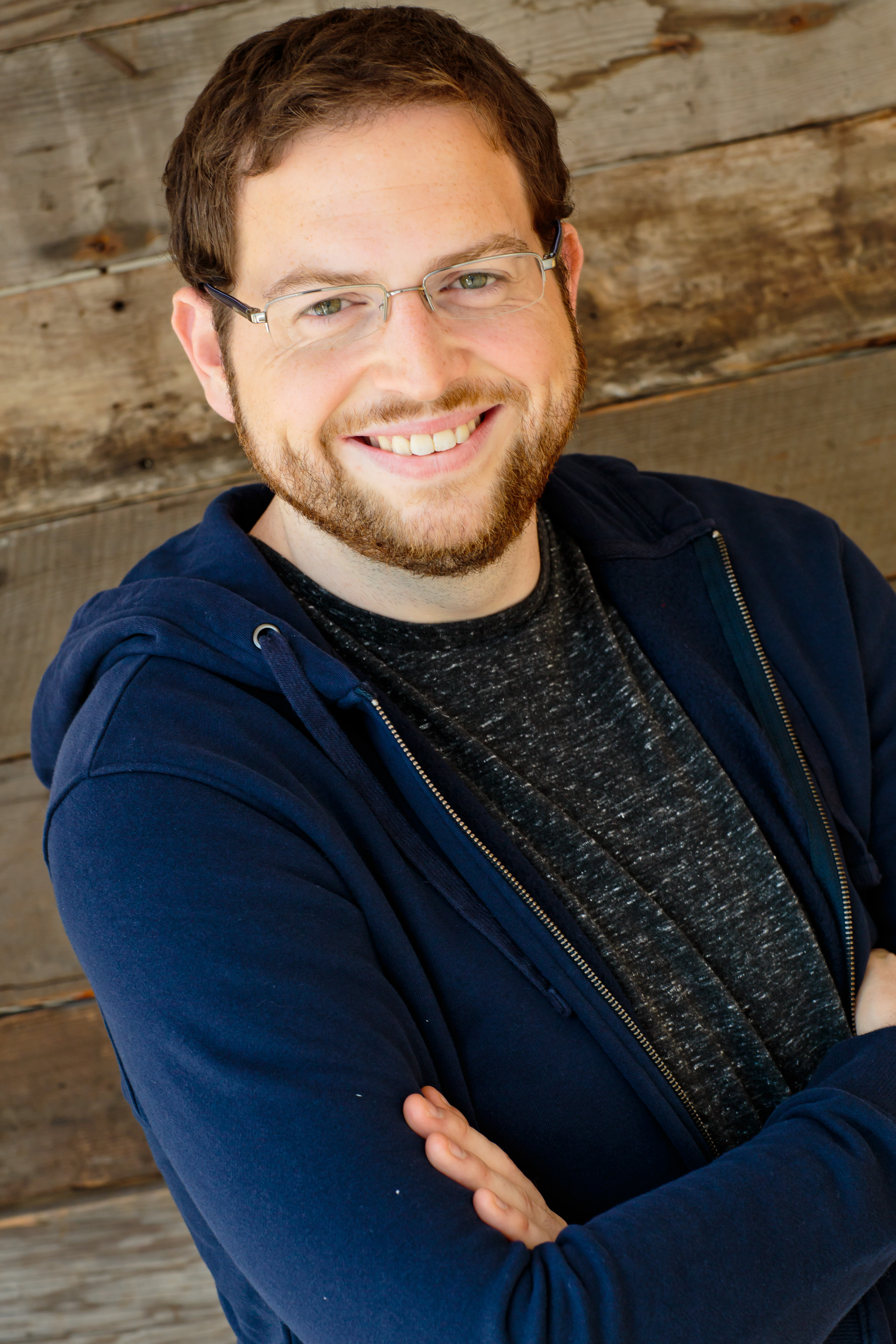
- Hardesty in 2025
- Born: April 13, 1987 (age 39); Baltimore, Maryland, U.S.
- Years active: 2006–present
- Known for: Acting, directing

YouTube information
- Channels: UndoTube; The Back Focus
- Years active: 2006–present (UndoTube); 2014–present (The Back Focus)
- Genres: Comedy, entertainment, documentary, entertainment commentary
- Subscribers: 117 thousand (UndoTube); 161 thousand (The Back Focus)
- Views: 61.1 million (UndoTube); 26.7 million (The Back Focus)
- Last updated: July 12, 2026

Brandon Allan Hardesty (born April 13, 1987) is an American comedic performer and actor. Hardesty posts original comedy videos as well as "uncanny" recreations of scenes from movies, playing every part himself. The Village Voice writer Julian Dibbell has called his works "web culture at its finest."

== Personal life ==
Hardesty was born in Baltimore, Maryland, the youngest child in the family. He is the son of Susan and Brent Hardesty, who is a pianist. He was home-schooled until middle school.

While at Baltimore Lutheran School, a teacher convinced Hardesty into acting in the school's theater productions. He worked as a cashier at a nearby grocery store until beginning his acting career.

== Career ==
=== YouTube ===
On YouTube, Hardesty goes by the username "ArtieTSMITW," which is an abbreviation for "Artie: The Strongest Man in the World," a character from one of his favorite childhood shows, The Adventures of Pete and Pete. His most popular videos are his Re-enactment videos, in which he chooses a movie scene, and re-enacts it, playing all the characters. One of his most popular and strikingly real performances is the drill instructor from Full Metal Jacket, originally portrayed by R. Lee Ermey. Another popular series is Strange Faces and Noises I Can Make, in which he demonstrates the strange faces and noises he can make. He has parodied the Internet sensation 2 Girls 1 Cup with "1 guy 1 lunchable".

To date, Hardesty has had seven of his videos featured on the front page of YouTube: his reenactment of a scene from The Princess Bride, his reenactment of a scene from Uncle Buck, a video dubbed "Three Impressions" which features three of Hardesty's celebrity impersonations, his "Strange Faces and Noises I Can Make III" video, which has had over 7.2 million views, a video entitled "The 30-Second Video," a video called "Request a Reenactment for YouTube Live," and a video called "Movies on YouTube? Huzzah!"

In April 2007, Geico Auto Insurance used "Strange Faces and Noises I Can Make III" in their television commercial. After a portion of the video plays, apparently on a computer screen, a narrator says, "There may be better ways to spend 15 minutes online." Hardesty's Strange Faces and Noises I Can Make video was parodied in the MTV sketch show Human Giant. In the sketch, Aziz Ansari portrayed a character who made a similar funny faces video like Hardesty's.

In November 2008, Hardesty participated in YouTube's first live show: YouTube Live. He asked his fans to request a scene for him to reenact, promising that the #1 most requested scene would air on YouTube Live. It ended up being a popular scene from The Dark Knight, and received over 150,000 views on YouTube in the first week. Hardesty was also interviewed briefly by fellow YouTuber, William Sledd.

In May 2014, Hardesty started a second YouTube channel, No Small Parts, a documentary web series about character actors in the entertainment industry. As of June 2018, the channel has over 1.8 million video views. Some of the actors covered in the series include: Warwick Davis, Harry Dean Stanton, Richard Kiel, Crispin Glover and Pete Postlethwaite amongst others.

As of June 18, 2018, Hardesty has made all of his previous videos on his "ArtieTSMITW" YouTube channel private and changed its name to "UndoTube." However, he brought those previous videos back up.

In July 2018, Hardesty sold the brand of "No Small Parts" to IMDb and rebranded his "No Small Parts" channel to "The Back Focus," a channel "about discovering and commenting on under-appreciated and forgotten elements in entertainment."

After lying dormant for several years, Hardesty and his creative partner Kenny Johnson revitalized the channel in February of 2024 with a broader array of content featuring actor bios, acting analyses of classic films, and obscure film recommendations. As of July 2026, the channel has grown to approximately 161,000 subscribers and 26.7 million total views.

=== Acting career ===
In September 2007, upon seeing Hardesty's YouTube videos, a producer of the film Bart Got a Room e-mailed Hardesty expressing interest in casting him for a supporting role. Hardesty auditioned, got the part, and spent three weeks in Florida for the shoot. After the film Hardesty continued to audition for films and TV shows eventually landing a lead role in American Pie Presents: The Book of Love, as well as a supporting role in the film Bucky Larson: Born to Be a Star, both filmed in 2009.

From 2009 to 2012, Hardesty was cast as a lead in a CBS pilot entitled Living On A Prayer and posted a YouTube video doing a celebration dance, but it was not picked up by the network. He was cast as a lead in a short film "Ham Sandwich," directed by David Green. In 2013 Hardesty has been cast in roles in the film Seven Minutes as well as The Scorpion King 4: Quest for Power, the fourth installment in the Mummy film franchise.

== Filmography ==
Year	Film	Role	Other notes
2008	Bart Got a Room	Craig	
2009	American Pie Presents: The Book of Love	Lube	Straight-to-DVD
2010	The Bill Collector	Iggy	Supporting role
2010	Living On A Prayer	PK	Unaired CBS/Fox Pilot
2011	Bucky Larson: Born to Be a Star	Lars	Nominated – Golden Raspberry Award for Worst Ensemble
2011	Ham Sandwich	Baxter	Comedy Central Short
2012	South Park	Live action Eric Cartman	TV show - Episode: "I Should Have Never Gone Ziplining"
2013	Seven Minutes	Jerome	
2014	The Scorpion King 4: Quest for Power	Boris	
2015	The Haunted Hathaways	Terry	TV show - Episode: Haunted Family
2018	Affairs of State	Kevin Bidwell	
