= Prison Break =

American TV series

- Genre: Crime drama; Action thriller
- Created by: Paul Scheuring
- Starring: Dominic Purcell; Wentworth Miller; Robin Tunney; Peter Stormare; Amaury Nolasco; Marshall Allman; Wade Williams; Paul Adelstein; Robert Knepper; Rockmond Dunbar; Sarah Wayne Callies; William Fichtner; Chris Vance; Robert Wisdom; Danay García; Jodi Lyn O'Keefe; Michael Rapaport; Mark Feuerstein; Inbar Lavi; Augustus Prew
- Composer: Ramin Djawadi
- Country of origin: United States
- Original languages: English; Spanish; Arabic
- No. of seasons: 5
- No. of episodes: 90 (list of episodes)

Production
- Executive producers: Marty Adelstein; Neal H. Moritz; Dawn Parouse; Brett Ratner; Paul Scheuring; Matt Olmstead; Kevin Hooks; Michael Pavone; Dawn Olmstead; Vaun Wilmott; Michael Horowitz; Nelson McCormick
- Production locations: Chicago, Illinois; Joliet, Illinois; Dallas, Texas; Pensacola, Florida; Los Angeles, California; Toronto, Ontario; Vancouver, British Columbia; Panama City; Rabat; Casablanca; Ouarzazate
- Cinematography: Dante Spinotti; Fernando Argüelles; Jeffrey C. Mygatt; Robert LaBonge; Chris Manley; Robbie Greenberg; Rick Anderson
- Editors: Mark Helfrich; Etienne Des Lauriers; Scott Eilers; Eric Seaburn; Warren Bowman; Kaja Fehr; James Coblentz
- Running time: 42–44 minutes
- Production companies: Rat Entertainment (pilot); Original Film; Adelstein/Parouse Productions (seasons 1–4); Dawn Olmstead Productions (season 5); Adelstein Productions (season 5); One Light Road Productions (season 5); 20th Century Fox Television

Original release
- Network: Fox
- Release: August 29, 2005 – May 27, 2009
- Release: April 4 – May 30, 2017

Related
- Breakout Kings

Prison Break is an American crime drama television series created by Paul Scheuring for Fox. The series revolves around two brothers: Lincoln Burrows (Dominic Purcell) and Michael Scofield (Wentworth Miller); Lincoln has been sentenced to death for a crime he did not commit, while Michael devises an elaborate plan to help his brother escape prison and clear his name. Along with creator Paul Scheuring, the series was executive-produced by Matt Olmstead, Kevin Hooks, Marty Adelstein, Dawn Parouse, Neal H. Moritz, and Brett Ratner who directed the pilot episode. The series' theme music, composed by Ramin Djawadi, was nominated for a Primetime Emmy Award in 2006. Prison Break is a joint production between Original Film, Adelstein/Parouse Productions (seasons 1–4), Dawn Olmstead Productions (season 5), Adelstein Productions (season 5), One Light Road Productions (season 5), and 20th Century Fox Television.

The series was initially rejected by Fox in 2003, which expressed concerns about its long-term prospects. Following the popularity of serialized prime time television series 24 and Lost, Fox decided to back production in 2004. The first season received mostly positive reviews from critics. Furthermore, it performed exceptionally in the ratings and was originally planned for a 13-episode run, but was extended to include an extra nine episodes due to its popularity. The subsequent seasons continued to receive strong ratings; however, some critics claimed the show had overstayed its welcome. Prison Break was nominated in several industry awards, including the 2005 Golden Globe Award for Best Television Series Drama and the 2006 People's Choice Award for Favorite New TV Drama, which it won. In the United States, all five seasons have been released on DVD and later released internationally on Blu-ray

The success of the series has spawned several official tie-ins: a video game, the spin-off series Prison Break: Proof of Innocence for mobile phones, online webisodes, an official magazine, and a novel. The fourth season of Prison Break returned from its mid-season break in a new timeslot on April 17, 2009, for the series' last six episodes. Two additional episodes, titled "The Old Ball and Chain" and "Free" were produced, and were later transformed into a standalone feature, titled The Final Break. Its events take place before the last scene of the series finale, and conclude the plotlines. The feature was released on DVD and Blu-ray July 21, 2009.

A nine-episode fifth season was announced by Fox in January 2016. The revival series premiered on April 4, 2017, and concluded on May 30. In January 2018, Fox confirmed that season 6 was in early development; however, in August 2019, Fox announced that it had no current plans to revive Prison Break, with Miller stating in late 2020 that he had no plan to return to the series.

== Series overview ==
Season	Episodes	Originally released	
Season	Episodes	First released	Last released
1	22	August 29, 2005	May 15, 2006
2	22	August 21, 2006	April 2, 2007
3	13	September 17, 2007	February 18, 2008
4	22	September 1, 2008	May 15, 2009
The Final Break		May 27, 2009 (Note: The television film first aired in the UK on May 27, 2009. The film was released direct-to-video on DVD and Blu-Ray in the United States on July 21, 2009.)	
5	9	April 4, 2017	May 30, 2017

=== Season 1 ===
The first season follows the rescue of Lincoln Burrows, who is accused of murdering Terrence Steadman, the brother of the vice president of the United States, Caroline Reynolds. Lincoln is sentenced to death and is incarcerated in Fox River State Penitentiary where he awaits his execution. Lincoln's brother, brilliant structural engineer Michael Scofield, is convinced of Lincoln's innocence and formulates an elaborate escape plan. In order to gain access to Fox River, Michael commits an armed robbery which results in him being sentenced to Fox River. In prison, Michael befriends the prison doctor Sara Tancredi when he pretends to suffer from Type 1 diabetes, in order to gain daily access to the prison's infirmary, where he receives his daily insulin shots. The brothers' fight to ward off the execution is aided by their lifelong friend Veronica Donovan, who begins to investigate the conspiracy that put Lincoln in jail. However, they are hindered by covert agents, members of an organization called "The Company". The Company was responsible for framing Lincoln, and they did so because of Lincoln's father Aldo Burrows, and his former connections with The Company. The brothers, along with six inmates, Fernando Sucre, Theodore "T-Bag" Bagwell, Benjamin Miles "C-Note" Franklin, David "Tweener" Apolskis, John Abruzzi, and Charles "Haywire" Patoshik, who come to be known as the Fox River Eight, escape in the season's penultimate episode by using their prison privileges to climb across a suspended electrical line out of the prison.

=== Season 2 ===
The second season begins eight hours after the escape, focusing mainly on the eight escapees. Series creator Paul Scheuring describes the second season as "The Fugitive times eight" and likens it to the "second half of The Great Escape". The fugitives split up and journey to locations across the country with the authorities close behind them as they each pursue their individual goals. Brad Bellick gets fired from the prison where he worked as the main guard and chases after the inmates himself for the reward money. Several of the escapees reunite in search of a large cache of money buried long ago by another Fox River inmate, Charles Westmoreland. Federal agent Alexander Mahone is assigned to track down and capture the eight fugitives, but is revealed to be working for The Company, which wants all eight men dead. When Sara discovers her father, Governor Frank Tancredi, has been killed, she meets with Michael, remaining with him as the brothers try to bring down now-president Reynolds, a Company member. To ensure the brothers' safety, Sara allows herself to be arrested and faces trial. During the trial, the testimony of former Secret Service agent Paul Kellerman, who used to work for The Company-controlled president, exonerates Lincoln and Sara. Half of the escapees are killed or recaptured, but the brothers make it to Panama. Michael, T-Bag, Mahone, and Bellick are arrested by the Panamanian authorities and imprisoned at the Penitenciaría Federal de Sona.

=== Season 3 ===
The third season follows Michael inside Sona and Lincoln on the outside in Panama. Sona is a prison run by the inmates and guarded only from the outside, due to a riot the year before. Inmates are only supplied with food and water and are expected to distribute and serve fellow inmates independently. The surrounding landscape is monitored by armed guards, who shoot at the sight of inmates escaping. Burrows is quickly contacted by Gretchen Morgan (a Company's operative who was in charge of operations in Panama) who kidnapped his son LJ and Sara, the woman Michael loves. He is told that The Company wants Scofield to break James Whistler out of Sona. The season follows Michael and Whistler's trials in formulating an escape plan, as Michael has to deal with extreme tension and as Lincoln deals with The Company's operative Gretchen Morgan. Sucre gets a job at the prison to aid Michael in his escape plan. When Lincoln attempts to rescue Sara and LJ following a clue provided by Sara, Gretchen claims to have beheaded Sara and sends Lincoln a head in a box as a warning. As the season ends, the pair manage to escape along with Mahone, and another inmate, Luis, leaving behind several accomplices including T-Bag and Bellick. Sucre's identity is discovered by a prison guard and he is thrown into Sona just after the escape. LJ and Sofia (who was captured for a guarantee that Whistler would go with her) are traded for Whistler, and Michael seeks revenge against Gretchen for Sara's death.

=== Season 4 ===
The major storyline for the fourth season is about a team recruited by Homeland Security agent Don Self to obtain Scylla. Although the team initially believes it to be The Company's "black book", it is later revealed to contain information on an advanced renewable power cell. Over the course of the first half of the season, the team obtains cards to access Scylla and breaks into The Company's headquarters to steal it, Sara is discovered to be alive, Bellick dies when he sacrifices himself, and Self is revealed to be a double agent intent on selling Scylla to the highest bidder. Reluctantly, Lincoln decides to join The Company to get it back, while Michael suffers from a brain tumor. He is treated and operated on by The Company. Michael later learns that his mother Christina is still alive and was an agent of The Company, who is revealed to acquire Scylla to sell to the highest bidder. Eventually, the series' main storyline of the past 4 seasons ends in Miami, where Scylla is recovered by Michael and the team, the General and The Company are taken down, and Sara kills Christina to protect her lover.

The last two episodes of the season represent the series finale. In the penultimate episode, Sara is seen buying flowers in Panama with her toddler son, Michael, before visiting Michael's grave with Lincoln, Sucre and Mahone. The final episode and television movie Prison Break: The Final Break show what happened between the takedown of The Company and Michael's death. This story involves the incarceration of Sara in Miami-Dade county penitentiary for Christina's murder. The General and T-Bag are in the adjacent men's facility. The General wants Sara dead and has put a $100,000 bounty on her. Michael hears of the bounty and devises a plan to break Sara out. In the end, knowing that he is dying from a brain tumor, Michael sacrifices himself for Sara to escape.

=== Season 5 ===
Seven years after Michael Scofield's apparent death, strange clues begin to surface, suggesting he may still be alive. Lincoln Burrows, his brother, receives a mysterious photograph from an unknown source that seems to show Michael in a Yemeni prison. Initially skeptical, Lincoln begins to investigate, driven by the hope that his brother might have somehow survived.

Lincoln's search leads him to discover that Michael is being held in Ogygia Prison in Sana’a, Yemen, under a new identity: Kaniel Outis, a name associated with terrorist activities. Outis is wanted by authorities for criminal and terrorist activities. Lincoln, however, believes that Michael's identity is being misrepresented.

As political tensions in Yemen escalate into full-blown civil war, Lincoln teams up with C-Note, who has reformed and is now a devout Muslim with connections in the region. With the help of a local activist named Sheba, they navigate war-torn streets, rebel factions, and corrupt officials in an effort to reach Ogygia and uncover the truth.

Inside the prison, Michael is alive—but a changed man. He appears emotionally detached and distant, refusing to acknowledge Lincoln or explain his situation. He's imprisoned alongside a select group of inmates, including the loyal and sharp Whip, the unpredictable and tech-savvy Ja, and the radical Ramal, a dangerous figure tied to extremist movements.

As Lincoln digs deeper, he learns that Michael was recruited years ago by a shadowy U.S. intelligence operative known only as Poseidon, who used Michael's unique skill set for covert missions. When Michael tried to leave the operation, Poseidon had him "disappeared," stripping him of his identity and separating him from everyone he loved—including Sara and their son.

Lincoln realizes that Michael has been playing a long game from inside the prison, planning yet another impossible escape. But getting out of Ogygia is only the beginning. Once free, they must navigate a collapsing country, evade militants, and bring down a powerful enemy operating at the highest levels of the U.S. government—all while trying to reunite Michael with his family and clear his name.

== Cast and characters ==
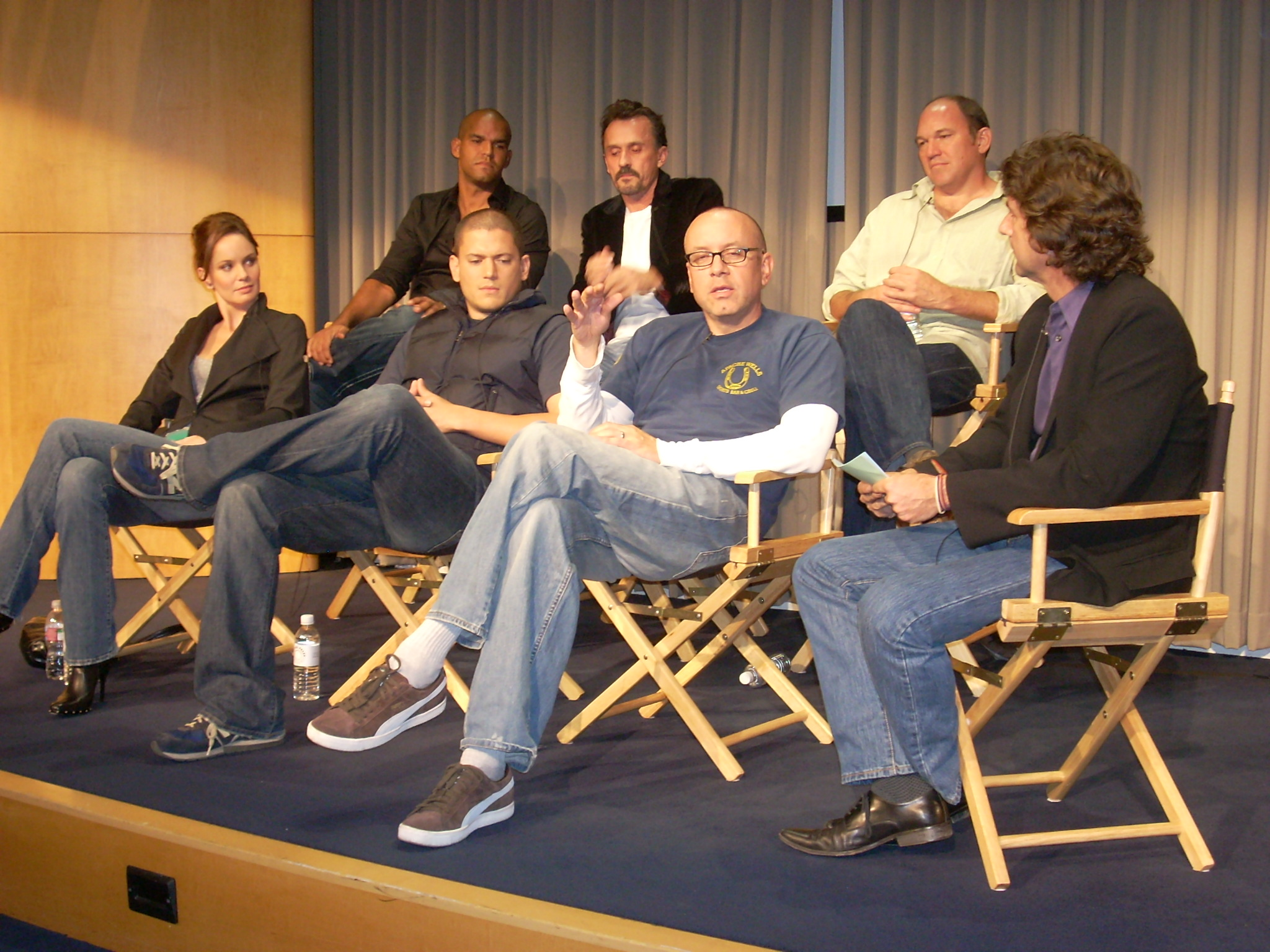
Cast members Amaury Nolasco, Robert Knepper, Wade Williams, Sarah Wayne Callies, Wentworth Miller with executive producer Matt Olmstead

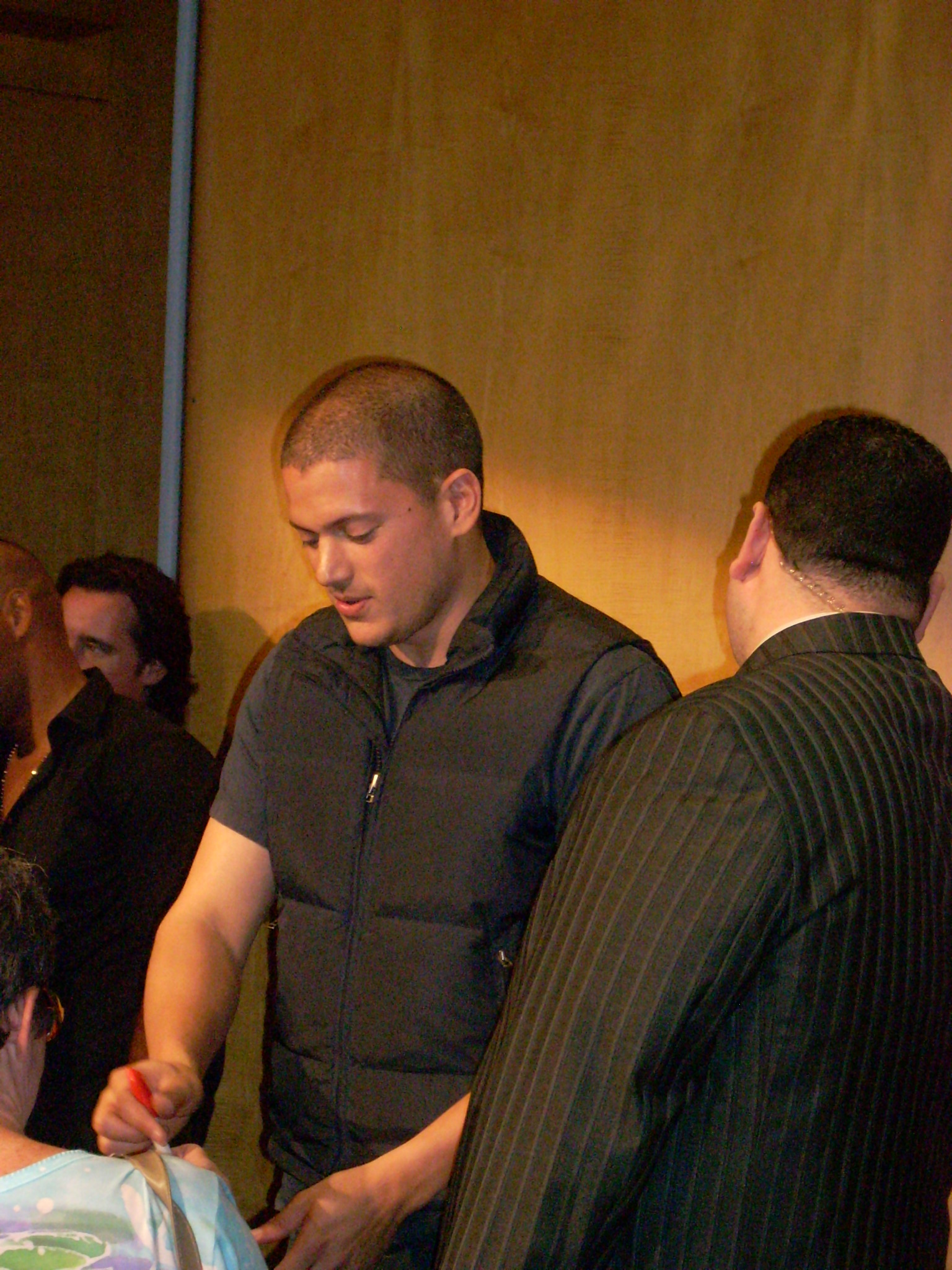
Wentworth Miller signing autographs in Beverly Hills, California

Prison Break maintains an ensemble cast for each season along with many recurring guest stars. The first season features a cast of ten actors who receive star billing, who were based in Chicago or at Fox River State Penitentiary. The second season features a cast of nine actors who receive billing; three characters are downgraded from series regular to recurring status, another is upgraded, and a new character is introduced. The third season introduces four new characters; two of whom are prisoners at Penitenciaría Federal de Sona.

Most of the changes in the cast have been due to character deaths. Series creator Paul Scheuring explains that killing off major characters "makes the audience that much more fearful for our protagonists" and that "it actually does help us in terms of reducing story lines". The two protagonists of the series, Michael Scofield and Lincoln Burrows, are the only characters to have appeared in every episode of the series.

- Dominic Purcell as Lincoln Burrows: Lincoln is a high school drop-out and a convicted felon, who is wrongfully convicted of the murder of Terence Steadman, the brother of the vice president of the United States. Purcell was cast three days before the start of production and consequently, he was the last actor to join the original cast. He auditioned for the role while he had a recurring role as Tommy Ravetto on North Shore. Since working on John Doe, Purcell has had an amiable relationship with Fox. Hence, he was sent the pilot script of Prison Break. Scheuring's first impression of Purcell did not convince him as a fit for the role since the actor went to the audition with his hair styled and a tan. However, Purcell's acting won the role. He arrived on the set on the first day of filming with a shaved head, which amazed Scheuring with the physical likeness of the series' two leading actors.
- Wentworth Miller as Michael Scofield: Michael is Lincoln's brother (his last name is his mother's maiden name), and worked as a structural engineer before devoting full-time to his brother's case. In order to save his brother's life, Michael creates an elaborate plan to help his brother escape from prison. In an interview, Paul Scheuring recalled that most of the actors who tested for the role "would come in playing mysterious, but it was so cheesy and false." A week before the start of production, Miller auditioned for the role and impressed Scheuring with his performance; he was cast the following day.
- Amaury Nolasco as Fernando Sucre: Sucre develops a friendship with Michael during time at Fox River State Penitentiary, where he was his cell-mate. Initially, his character's story focuses on his wish to reunite with his fiancée. Upon receiving the pilot script, Nolasco's first thought was that it was "one of those failed pilots that the network did not really want" since most of the series' pilots would have started production by that time. Admitting that he does not like to read, Nolasco was amazed that the script was a "huge page-turner". Prior to his last audition for the role, Nolasco recalled his nervousness, which grew when Paul Scheuring told him that he was their favorite choice. Subsequently, he was cast in the role.
- Robert Knepper as Theodore "T-Bag" Bagwell: T-Bag appears in all five seasons of the series as a cunning, violent, and manipulative psychopath, consistently underestimated by those around him. According to Knepper, "I never play him like a stereotypical racist or redneck. He's actually quite cunning and smart." He likens the character to "Truman Capote without a degree." Knepper has described slowly winning the support of fans despite playing a dangerous character, and later preferred to talk less about the heinous crimes for which T-Bag was initially imprisoned.
- Robin Tunney as Veronica Donovan (seasons 1–2): Veronica is Michael and Lincoln's childhood friend who decides to review Lincoln's case at Michael's insistence. She becomes Lincoln's lawyer and appears as a major character in the first season. She also stars in the first episode of the second season.
- Peter Stormare as John Abruzzi (seasons 1–2): Due to his role as the leader of a Chicago mafia, Abruzzi became a prominent figure at Fox River State Penitentiary. He agrees to provide an escape jet plane for Michael in exchange for the location of the eyewitness to his crimes, Otto Fibonacci. He appears regularly in the first half of the first season and makes selected appearances towards the end of the first season and the beginning of the second season.
- Marshall Allman as Lincoln "L. J." Burrows Jr. (seasons 1–4): L. J. is the teenage son of Lincoln Burrows and is greatly affected by his father's death sentence. He is forced into hiding after he becomes the target of the people who want Lincoln dead.
- Wade Williams as Brad Bellick (seasons 1–4): Bellick is introduced as the captain of Fox River's correctional officers. After reading the pilot script, Williams initially did not want to portray the role of Bellick because the character was "horrible and despicable". His reluctance stemmed from being the father of a four-year-old daughter. However, his manager persuaded him to audition and Williams landed the role.
- Sarah Wayne Callies as Sara Tancredi (seasons 1–2, 4–5): Sara is the prison doctor at Fox River and the daughter of Governor Frank Tancredi, who is linked into the plot that brings Lincoln to Fox River. She takes a liking to Michael and eventually aids his escape. She ultimately joins them on the run. Callies was the first actress the producers saw at the audition for the role of Sara Tancredi and was also the first to become a principal cast member.
- Paul Adelstein as Paul Kellerman (seasons 1–2, 4–5): Kellerman was introduced as a Secret Service agent working for the vice president to make sure that the execution of Lincoln Burrows goes smoothly. He appears as a major character in the first and second seasons.
- Rockmond Dunbar as Benjamin Miles "C-Note" Franklin (seasons 1–2, 4–5): Desperate for his family, C-Note blackmails Michael at Fox River to join his escape team. He appears in the series as a major character in the first and second seasons.
- William Fichtner as Alexander Mahone (seasons 2–4): Introduced as an FBI agent in the second season, Mahone's assignment was to locate the fugitives. Mahone is intellectually matched with Michael and his background unfolds as the series progresses. In the third season he finds himself incarcerated with Michael in Sona and is eventually forced to become his ally through the fourth season.
- Chris Vance as James Whistler (seasons 3–4): Whistler is incarcerated in Sona for the murder of the Mayor's son and appears as a major character in the third season. He also stars in the first episode of the fourth season.
- Robert Wisdom as Norman "Lechero" St. John (season 3): Appearing as a major character in the third season, Lechero is a prisoner at Sona who rules the prison as a dictator and a Panamanian drug kingpin.
- Danay Garcia as Sofia Lugo (seasons 3–4): Sofia was introduced in the third season as Whistler's girlfriend. At the beginning of the fourth season, she begins dating Lincoln Burrows.
- Jodi Lyn O'Keefe as Gretchen Morgan (seasons 3–4): Introduced as "Susan B. Anthony", Gretchen is an operative for The Company who is in charge of ensuring the escape of James Whistler.
- Michael Rapaport as Donald Self (season 4): Introduced in the fourth season, Self is a Department of Homeland Security special agent who teams up with the gang to take down The Company.
- Mark Feuerstein as Jacob Anton Ness (season 5): Introduced in the fifth season, Jacob is Sara's new husband and an economics professor who is later revealed to be a rogue CIA operative who is responsible for Michael's disappearance.
- Inbar Lavi as Sheba (season 5): The leader of a resistance against ISIL in Yemen, Sheba appears as C-Note's friend and Lincoln's love interest.
- Augustus Prew as David "Whip" Martin (season 5): Michael's cellmate and partner in the fifth season, as well as T-Bag's illegitimate son. He is the muscle to back up Michael, often called Michael's whip hand.

== Production ==
=== Conception ===
The original concept of Prison Break—a man deliberately getting himself sent to prison in order to help someone escape—was suggested to Paul Scheuring by producer Dawn Parouse, who wanted to produce an action-oriented series. Although Scheuring thought it was a good idea, he was initially stumped as to why someone would embark on such a mission or how he could develop it into a viable television show. He came up with the story of the wrongfully accused brother, and began working on the plot outline and devising the characters. In 2003, he pitched the idea to the Fox Broadcasting Company but was turned down as Fox felt nervous about the long-term possibilities of such a series. He subsequently showed the concept to other channels but was also turned down as it was thought to be more suited for a film project than a television series. Prison Break was later considered as a possible 14-part miniseries, which drew the interest of Steven Spielberg before his departure due to his involvement with War of the Worlds. Thus, the miniseries never materialized. Following the huge popularity of serialized prime time television series such as 24 and Lost, Fox backed the production in 2004. The pilot episode was filmed one year after Scheuring wrote the script.

=== Filming ===
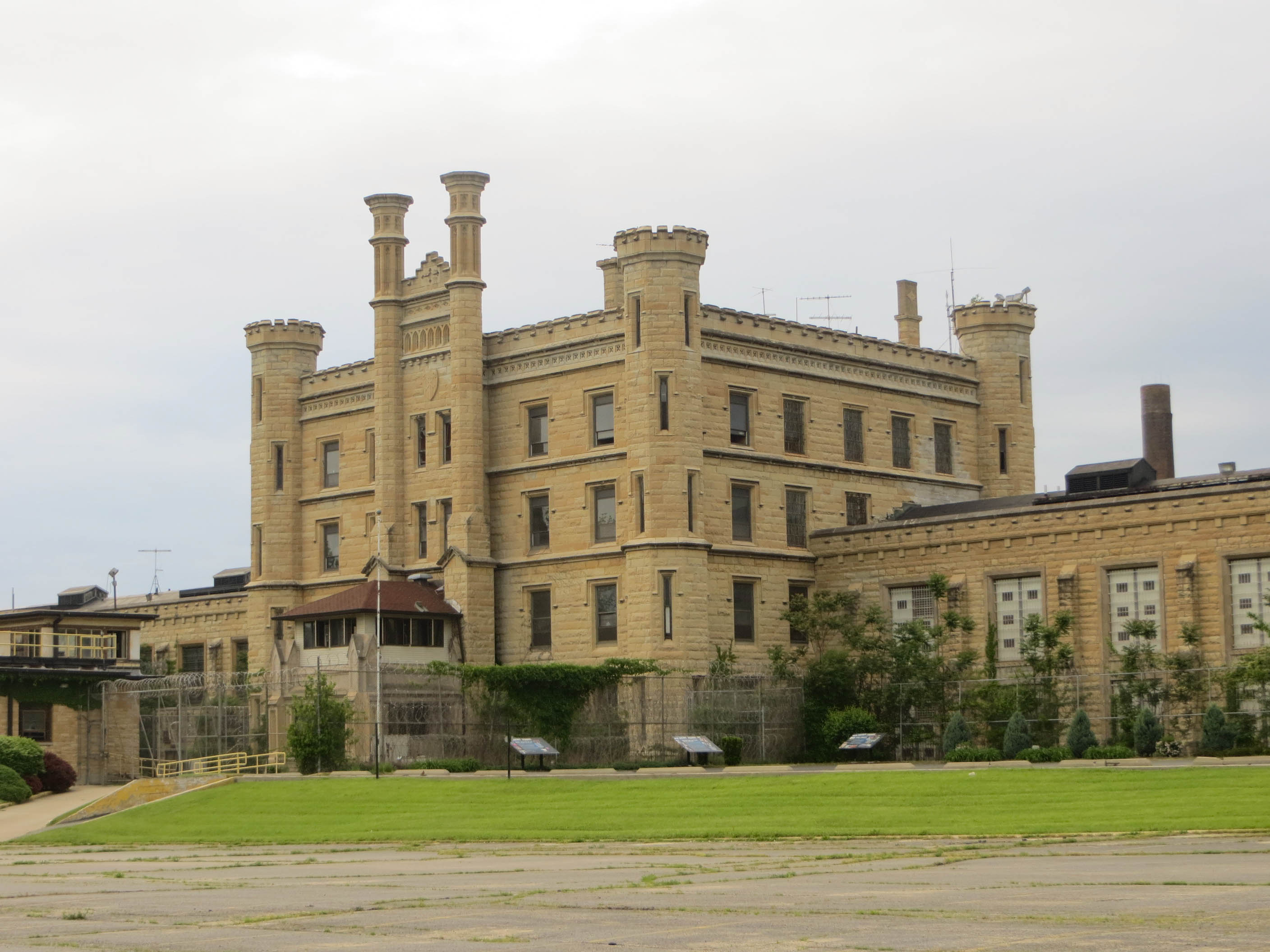
Joliet State Prison became the set of Fox River State Penitentiary in Prison Break.

The majority of the first season was filmed on location in and around Chicago. Joliet Prison closed in 2002, and in 2005 became the set of Prison Break as Fox River State Penitentiary. Scenes set in Lincoln's cell, the infirmary, and the prison yard were all shot on location there. Lincoln's cell was alleged to be where serial killer John Wayne Gacy was incarcerated, (Note: John Wayne Gacy was incarcerated at Menard Correctional Center in Chester, Illinois for 14 years, and then executed at Stateville Correctional Center in Crest Hill, Illinois. He was never held in nearby Joliet Correctional Center.) which at least one member of the production crew refused to enter, because it was allegedly haunted. Other sets were built at the prison, including the cell blocks that housed the general prison population; these blocks had three tiers of cells (instead of the real cell block's four), enlarged for the actors and cameras. Exterior scenes were filmed in areas around Chicago, Woodstock, and Joliet in Illinois. Other locations included O'Hare International Airport in Chicago and Toronto, Ontario in Canada. Prison Break production spent $2 million per episode in the state of Illinois, totaling $24 million in 2005.

Renewed for a second season, Prison Break resumed filming on June 15, 2006, in Dallas, Texas, due to the close proximity of rural and urban settings. Locations within a 30-minute radius of Dallas included Little Elm, Decatur, Mineral Wells, and McKinney. Many of these locations were used to represent various American towns. The show was expected to spend more than $50 million in Texas during the second season. For the final three episodes of the second season, filming took place in Pensacola, Florida to represent Panama. Each episode took eight days to film and contributed approximately $1.4 million to the local economy.

The third season was shot in Dallas and had a budget of $3 million per episode. Several of the exterior scenes with Lincoln and Gretchen negotiating the escape from the Panama jail were shot in the Casco Viejo quarter of Panama City. The principal photography for the fourth season was relocated to Los Angeles, California.

=== Music ===
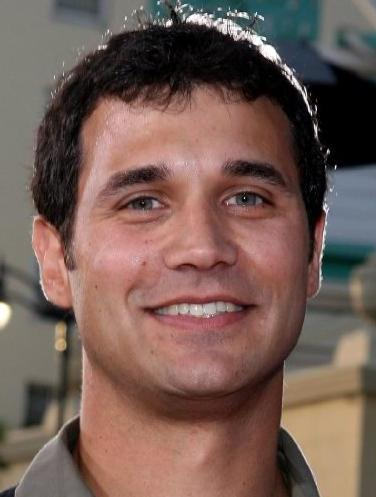
Ramin Djawadi is the composer of the Prison Break score.

The theme music of Prison Break and the incidental music of each episode was composed by Ramin Djawadi. The score for the first two seasons is featured in the Prison Break: Original Television Soundtrack, which was released on August 28, 2007. Djawadi and Ferry Corsten produced a remix of the theme music titled "Prison Break Theme (Ferry Corsten Breakout Mix)" as a single, which was released by Fox Music in 2006. In Europe, rapper Faf Larage's song "Pas le temps" is used by television network M6 in France and by RTL-TVI in Belgium to replace the show's original theme music in the title sequence, which generated publicity and helped to localize the show.

=== Format ===
Prison Break features a serialized story structure, similar to that of its first season companion show 24. At the 2009 TV Critics Press Tour, Kevin Reilly told reporters that the series would end with the fourth season. Despite decreasing ratings, Reilly attributed the cancellation to creativity. He stated, "The show has just played out. You get to a point creatively where you feel all the stories have been told, and you want to end strong and not gimp out in the end of the season." Regarding the finale, Reilly stated, "They have a really cool ending, actually. I know where they end, and it's a hell of an idea."

=== Tattoo ===
Designed by Tom Berg and created by Tinsley Transfers, Michael Scofield's tattoo took around five hours to be applied onto Wentworth Miller. In scenes where the actor is wearing a T-shirt and the entire tattoo is not being shown, only the forearm pieces of the tattoo were applied.

== Reception ==
=== Critical response ===
The first season received generally positive reviews. On review aggregator Metacritic, the season scored 65 out of 100 based on 32 reviews, signifying "generally favorable" reviews. On Rotten Tomatoes, the season has an approval rating of 79% based on 34 reviews, with a critics consensus stating: "Prison Break is confident pulp with a crackerjack premise that spreads thinly enough to smooth over the show's more lunkheaded flourishes." Alessandra Stanley of The New York Times wrote, Prison Break was "more intriguing than most of the new network series, and it certainly is one of the most original", complimenting its ability to create a "suspenseful thriller" and its "authentic look". Gillian Flynn of Entertainment Weekly dubbed it one of the best new shows of 2005. The Washington Post criticized the "somber pretentiousness" and "uniformly overwrought" performances.

The second season received generally positive reviews, but less enthusiastic than the first. On Rotten Tomatoes, the season has an approval rating of 71% based on 14 reviews, with a critics consensus stating: "Prison Break's second phase branches its inaugural season's focused narrative into a series of tangents on the lam, which may lose the interest of some viewers but does maintain the series' propulsive momentum." Robert Bianco of USA Today commented on the "harebrained absurdities that have swamped this show", and blamed the writers for being "incredibly lazy" for the continuous use of the tattoo as an "all-purpose plot fix". In contrast, Detroit Free Press commended the second-season premiere on matching the standard set by the first season, which delivered "rocking good entertainment" due to its "motley crew of cellblock characters" and the "taut, ingenious storytelling of series creator Paul T. Scheuring and his staff".

The third and particularly fourth season received progressively negative reviews, as the show's plot diverged from its origin story of breaking out of prison, and focused more on conventional elements of a government conspiracy drama series. On Rotten Tomatoes, the third season has an approval rating of 50% based on 12 reviews, with a critics consensus stating: "Prison Break's third season relocates the drama back behind bars, but the series feels like it's just retreading old ground with a series of new contrivances in tow." The fourth season has an approval rating of 50% based on 10 reviews, with a critics consensus stating: "Prison Break's (first) series finale will bring closure to the diehard fans, but the season's ludicrous, plot-breaking twists betray the feeling that this saga should have ended a jailbreak or two before."

Season five received mixed reviews. On Rotten Tomatoes, the season has an approval rating of 56% based on 34 reviews, with a critics consensus stating: "Prison Break recaptures some of its old urgency in its return, but familiar faces and frenetic action aren't enough to make up for a plot that manages to bore while beggaring belief." On Metacritic, the season has a score of 48 out of 100, based on 18 critics, indicating "mixed or average" reviews.

=== Ratings ===
The show debuted on August 29, 2005, to an estimated audience of 10.5 million viewers. Fox had not had such success for mid-year Monday numbers since Melrose Place and Ally McBeal aired in September 1998. The premiere was ranked first in both the 18–49 and 18–34 demographics. Due to its ratings success, Fox extended Prison Break by an extra nine episodes, making it the first new series in the 2005–2006 television season to receive a full season order of 22 episodes. The series averaged 9.2 million viewers per week in its first season.

The premiere of the second season of Prison Break obtained an average of 9.4 million viewers. The decline was steeper among young-adult viewers with a decrease of 20% in the 18–49 demographic compared to its series premiere, but its household rating grew from 3.6% to 3.9% during the last half-hour. The second season obtained its largest audience on the original airdate of the episode, "Chicago" with an average of 10.1 million viewers. Overall, the second season averaged 9.3 million viewers per week.

The following seasonal rankings are based on a weighted average total viewers per episode as recorded by Nielsen Media Research. The recording period begins in late September (the start of the U.S. network television season) and ends in late May.

Season	Time slot (ET)	Episodes	Premiered		Ended		Viewers (in millions)	#Rank
Season	Time slot (ET)	Episodes	Date	Premiere viewers (in millions)	Date	Finale viewers (in millions)	Viewers (in millions)	#Rank
1	Monday 9:00 p.m. (2005)/Monday 8:00 p.m. (2006)	22	August 29, 2005	10.51	May 15, 2006	10.24	9.2	55
2	Monday 8:00 p.m.	22	August 21, 2006	9.37	April 2, 2007	8.12	9.3	51
3	Monday 8:00 p.m.	13	September 17, 2007	7.51	February 18, 2008	7.40	8.2	73
4	Monday 9:00 p.m. (2008)/Friday 8:00 p.m. (2009)	22	September 1, 2008	6.53	May 15, 2009	3.32	6.1	68
5	Tuesday 9:00 p.m.	9	April 4, 2017	3.83	May 30, 2017	2.30	4.0	115

According to the file-sharing news website TorrentFreak, Prison Break was the sixth most-watched pirated television series of 2017. The show later gained renewed popularity after becoming available on streaming platforms like Hulu and Netflix. Nielsen Media Research, which records streaming viewership on U.S. television screens, estimated that the series was watched for 758 million minutes from July 29 to August 4, 2024. From August 5 to 11, 2024, Prison Break was the most-streamed program, with 1.6 billion minutes of viewership. The following week, it maintained its top position, with 1.61 billion minutes of viewing time. Hispanic viewers remained a key demographic, constituting nearly one-third of the audience. Nielsen Media Research later reported that Prison Break garnered 1.188 billion minutes of viewing time, once again ranking as the most-streamed television series, from August 26 to September 1, 2024. Since its addition to Netflix in late July 2024, the series has continued to gain significant traction, dominating the overall streaming charts and holding the top spot for a fourth consecutive week. In the week leading up to September 15, 2024, seasons one, two, and three of Prison Break reappeared on Netflix's English-language TV chart. Season one ranked No. 3 with 4.7 million views, followed by season two at No. 7 with 2.8 million views, and season three at No. 10 with 1.7 million views.

=== Classification ===
Concerns were raised by the Parents Television Council in the United States about the time slot in which Prison Break was broadcast (8:00 pm ET) because of graphic content. In France, the broadcasting watchdog, Conseil Supérieur de l'Audiovisuel (CSA), also complained that the violence in some episodes exceeded the amount allowed for its rating, which is "not for under 10s". Under France's regulations, any higher ratings would have moved the show away from its primetime time slot to a later time slot. However, the decision to change the rating would have affected only the first season, which had already been broadcast, and not the second season.

=== Awards and nominations ===
Awards and nominations received by Prison Break
Awards	Year	Category	Nominee(s)	Result	Ref.
Australian Film Institute Awards	2007	Best Actor	Dominic Purcell	Won	
ALMA Awards	2006	Outstanding Director of a Television Drama or Comedy	Jesús Salvador Treviño	Won	
ALMA Awards	2006	Outstanding Supporting Actor in a Television Series	Amaury Nolasco	Nominated	
ALMA Awards	2008	Outstanding Supporting Actor in a Television Series	Amaury Nolasco	Nominated	
Eddie Awards	2006	Best Edited One-Hour Series for Television	Mark Helfrich (for the pilot episode)	Nominated	
Golden Globe Awards	2005	Best Actor – Television Series Drama	Wentworth Miller	Nominated	
Golden Globe Awards	2005	Best Television Series – Drama	Prison Break	Nominated	
Golden Reel Awards	2007	Best Sound Editing in Music for Television – Short Form	David Klotz (for "Disconnect")	Nominated	
Golden Reel Awards	2007	Best Sound Editing in Sound Effects and Foley for Television – Short Form	Gregory M. Gerlich, Casey J. Crabtree, Michael Crabtree, Dan Yale, Brian Risner, William Jacobs, Stuart Calderon, Andy Kopetzky, and Jerry Edemann (for "Disconnect")	Nominated	
Leo Awards	2018	Best Stunt Coordination in a Dramatic Series	Lauro David Chartrand-DelValle (for "Ogygia")	Won	
People's Choice Awards	2006	Favorite New Television Drama	Prison Break	Won	
Primetime Emmy Awards	2006	Outstanding Main Title Theme Music	Ramin Djawadi	Nominated	
Satellite Awards	2006	Best Supporting Actor – Series, Miniseries or Television Film	Robert Knepper	Nominated	
Saturn Awards	2005	Best Network Television Series	Prison Break	Nominated	
Saturn Awards	2005	Best Actor on Television	Wentworth Miller	Nominated	
Screen Actors Guild Awards	2008	Outstanding Performance by a Stunt Ensemble in a Television Series	Prison Break	Nominated	
Television Critics Association Awards	2006	Best New Program	Prison Break	Nominated	

=== Alleged copyright infringement ===
On October 24, 2006, the Associated Press reported that Donald and Robert Hughes filed a lawsuit against Fox Broadcasting Company and the show's executive producer and creator, Paul Scheuring, for copyright infringement, seeking unspecified damages and other costs. They claimed that in 2001, they had sent Fox their manuscript which was based on their own experiences of a prison break at a juvenile facility. In the 1960s, Donald Hughes planned and successfully executed a prison escape for his brother, Robert Hughes, who was wrongfully incarcerated.

== Distribution ==
=== Television ===
In Canada, Prison Break was broadcast on Global one hour before it aired on Fox, except in the Maritimes where it aired two hours before Fox's airing. Prison Break was the only new television series to be positioned in the top twenty television shows of 2005–2006 in Canada, achieving an average of 876,000 viewers in the key demographic of 18–49 and 1.4 million viewers nationally for its first season. Prison Break premiered on the Australian television network Seven on February 1, 2006, to an average audience of 1.94 million. The first season attracted an overall average of 1.353 million viewers. After decreasing ratings throughout the second season, Seven decided to fast-track the airing of the third-season episodes. The fifth-season revival moved to Network Ten and debuted on May 15, 2017.

In the United Kingdom, the first and second seasons premiered on Five, with the first season being replayed on UKTV Gold before the second season debuted on Five. Prior to the start of the third season, Sky One acquired the rights to broadcast Prison Break, paying £500,000 per episode. The series premiered in France on August 31, 2006, with an average of 5.5 million viewers. The second season premiered on September 13, 2007, to 5.3 million viewers.

The first season's broadcast in Hong Kong on TVB Pearl received the largest audience in the country for a foreign drama. The series premiere obtained an average of 260,000 viewers while the first-season finale obtained an average of 470,000 viewers. The second season's premiere received an average of 270,000 viewers.

=== Home media ===
DVDs	Episodes	Discs	Release dates		
DVDs	Episodes	Discs	Region 1	Region 2	Region 4
Season One	22	6	August 8, 2006	September 18, 2006	September 13, 2006
Season Two	22	6	September 4, 2007	August 20, 2007	September 17, 2007
Season Three	13	4	August 12, 2008	May 19, 2008	December 3, 2008
Season Four	24	6/7	June 2, 2009	July 6, 2009	July 16, 2009
The Final Break	1	1	July 21, 2009		
Season Five	9	3	June 27, 2017		

The DVD and Blu-ray Disc sets of each season were released after their television broadcast in various regions. At the 2006 International Consumer Electronics Show, 20th Century Fox Home Entertainment announced that the complete first season of Prison Break was to be released on Blu-ray in early 2007. The release date was later announced to be November 13, 2007, and Prison Break became the first television show to be released on Blu-ray Disc by Fox. The Blu-ray box set contains six discs and includes all the DVD box set's special features. A DVD set containing the first three seasons was released on May 19, 2008, in Region 2. The television movie, Prison Break: The Final Break, was included in the Season 4 set in Regions 2 and 4, but was released separately in Region 1. The Final Break was later released separately in Regions 2 and 4. In France, Germany and the United Kingdom, a Blu-ray package of all four seasons including The Final Break has been released. Over a year after its initial release, Season 4 was later re-issued in Region 4 without The Final Break included.

=== Online distribution ===
In addition to the television broadcast of the show, episodes of Prison Break have also been released on the Internet. Towards the end of the first season, episodes of Prison Break were made available for purchase online at the iTunes Store, which began on May 9, 2006. After the premiere of the second season of Prison Break, Fox began allowing online streaming of the current episode for free via more than 50 websites including AOL, Google, and Yahoo!, as well as its own extensive network. However, this was restricted to the United States. The first three episodes of the second season were broadcast commercial free, available for a week after their television broadcast date. Online streaming of episodes was postponed after the third episode. However, due to the show's three-week broadcast hiatus prompted by Fox's broadcast of the Major League Baseball playoff games in October, a strategy was developed by News Corporation (the parent company of Fox Broadcasting Company and MySpace) in an attempt to maintain their viewers' interest in the show. Starting in October, Fox began to stream past episodes of the second season on the social networking site MySpace and websites of the network's owned and operated stations (the stations are part of the Fox Television Stations Group). Although commercials were aired throughout the broadcast, the episodes were free of charge.

== Other media ==
=== Spin-off series ===
A spin-off series, Prison Break: Proof of Innocence, was produced exclusively for mobile phones and was broadcast first to Sprint customers in April 2006 on SprintTV's Fox station. The first episode of Proof of Innocence became available on the Internet for viewing on May 8, 2006. This was an exclusive deal made between Toyota and News Corporation's Fox network, allowing Toyota to sponsor exclusive content of the show and to obtain advertising exclusivity.

During the show's third season, a series of six online shorts, collectively known as Prison Break: Visitations, were made exclusively for Fox. They feature the characters Lechero, Sammy, McGrady, T-Bag, and Bellick. They were distributed on the Internet and are available for free from iTunes.

On October 24, 2007, The Hollywood Reporter reported that a full spin-off series was under development, tentatively titled Prison Break: Cherry Hill. The series was to revolve around an upper-middle-class housewife, Molly, and her stint in a women's prison. However, the producers' original idea to introduce Molly in the third season of Prison Break was later dropped due to the writers' strike. The new series was planned to instead begin under the Prison Break brand similar to CSI: Miami and CSI: NY, but ultimately did not go into production.

==== Connection to Breakout Kings ====
Robert Knepper reprised his role as T-Bag in the 2011 A&E Network television series, Breakout Kings, which was created by Prison Break writers Matt Olmstead and Nick Santora.

=== Magazine, novel, book and comic ===
In printed media, the show's tie-in products include an official magazine and a tie-in novel. The official magazine, published by Titan Publishing, was launched on November 21, 2006. Each issue contains interviews with selected cast and crew members with other feature stories.

The tie-in novel, Prison Break: The Classified FBI Files (ISBN 1-4165-3845-3), contains details of the show's characters pertaining to the second season's storyline. Written by Paul Ruditis, the book is published by Simon & Schuster and was released on May 8, 2007.

In September 2009, Insight Editions published Prison Break: Behind the Scenes, a companion book featuring production photography, in which writers Christian Trokey and Kalinda Vazquez, as well as Paul Scheuring, Matt Olmstead, and director of photography Fernando Arguelles comment on the show's four-season run.

An official manga adaptation of the series became available on the online service Piccoma beginning June 23, 2019. Artwork is done by Hikosuke Soyama and the adaptation is under the supervision of Twentieth Century Fox.

=== Attraction tour ===
There is also a live feature called "Prison Break LIVE!", created by The Sudden Impact! Entertainment Company, which is an interactive experience aimed at bringing to life the atmosphere from the television series. The attraction toured the US, Australia, UK, China, Germany and Mexico from 2006 to 2008.

=== Video games ===
A mobile game for J2ME was released by Vivendi Games Mobile in 2008.

A video game based on Prison Break was in development for PlayStation 3 and Xbox 360 for release in February 2009, but was cancelled when Brash Entertainment shut down.

Development of Prison Break: The Conspiracy restarted when the game's developer, ZootFly, found a new publisher. The video game was released on March 30, 2010. The game's protagonist is Tom Paxton, a Company employee who is sent inside of Fox River to observe and report every move of Michael Scofield. The game features voices from the original cast members with the exception of Sarah Wayne Callies (Dr. Sara Tancredi) and Muse Watson (Charles Westmoreland).

=== International adaptation ===
In April 2010, it was announced that the series would be adapted for Russia. The Russian adaptation was entitled, Pobeg (Побег), which premiered on September 20, 2010, on Channel One. This adaptation uses many of the features of the original series, with some scenes and dialogue copied completely, but also introduces new storylines and characters which reflect the Russian reality.

=== Reboot ===
In November 2023, it was reported that a reboot written by Elgin James for Hulu was in development. It was also revealed that the series would not feature the same characters from the original series but would be set in the same world. In December 2024, Hulu ordered a pilot. Casting announcements began in March 2025, with Emily Browning, Lukas Gage, Drake Rodger, Clayton Cardenas, JR Bourne, Georgie Flores and Myles Bullock joined in series regulars roles for the pilot. Ray McKinnon, Margo Martindale, Donal Logue, Lili Taylor and Sylvester Powell were cast in guest roles. Production of the pilot began in June 2025 in West Virginia. In October 2025, the reboot was given a series order. Before the series order was announced, Priscilla Delgado was cast in a series regular role for the pilot, however in May 2026, her role was replaced by Kelli Berglund. In August 2026, Sean Bridgers, Sam Trammell, Kerry Bishé, Robin Weigert, Jean Louisa Kelly and Chris Coy joined the series in recurring roles. In September 2026, Noah Emmerich, Catfish Jean, Augie Duke, Brad Beyer, Greg Vrotsos, Daniel David Stewart and Michael Mosley joined the series in recurring roles. In the same month, it was announced that the filming of the series, which was titled as Prison Break: Black Creek, had begun.
