= Bart Got a Room =

- Promotional film poster
- Directed by: Brian Hecker
- Written by: Brian Hecker
- Produced by: Plum Pictures
- Starring: Steven Kaplan; Alia Shawkat; William H. Macy; Cheryl Hines; Ashley Benson; Brandon Hardesty; Kate Micucci; Jennifer Tilly; Dinah Manoff
- Cinematography: Hallvard Bræin
- Edited by: Danny Rafic
- Music by: Jamie Lawrence
- Distributed by: Anchor Bay Entertainment
- Release dates: April 25, 2008 (Tribeca Film Festival); April 3, 2009 (United States)
- Running time: 80 minutes
- Country: United States
- Language: English

Bart Got a Room is a 2008 comedy film written and directed by Brian Hecker, and stars Steven Kaplan, Alia Shawkat, William H. Macy, and Cheryl Hines. Also appearing in the film are Ashley Benson, Brandon Hardesty, Kate Micucci, Jennifer Tilly, Dinah Manoff (in her last film role as of 2022) and Chad Jamian Williams as Bart. The film premiered at the Tribeca Film Festival on April 25, 2008. It had a limited US release in select theaters on April 3, 2009, and was released on DVD on July 28, 2009.

== Plot ==
Danny Stein, a socially awkward high school senior, is facing the pressures of attending prom. With his parents embroiled in a messy divorce, Danny is left to navigate the complexities of high school life on his own. His main concern is finding a date for prom, but his attempts to impress girls and secure a date are consistently unsuccessful.

When Danny realizes he is running out of time, he takes matters into his own hands and attempts to secure a hotel room for the night, hoping it will impress his potential date and make the evening special. However, his efforts lead to a series of missteps, including mishandling his interactions with friends and potential romantic interests.

Throughout the film, Danny's relationship with his parents is also explored. His father, who is emotionally distant and preoccupied with his own problems, offers little guidance. Meanwhile, his mother is caught up in her own personal issues and struggles to provide the emotional support Danny needs.

In the end, after a series of comedic and awkward events, Danny begins to understand that prom and relationships aren't as important as personal growth and self-acceptance. The film concludes with Danny learning that it's okay to embrace who he is, even if things don't go as planned.

== Cast ==
- Steven Kaplan as Danny Stein
- William H. Macy as Ernie
- Cheryl Hines as Beth Stein
- Alia Shawkat as Camille
- Ashley Benson as Alice
- Brandon Hardesty as Craig
- Kate Micucci as Abby
- Jon Polito as Bob
- Jennifer Tilly as Melinda
- Katie McClellan as Gertie
- Dinah Manoff as Mrs Goodson
- Michael Mantell as Dr. Goodson
- Chad Jamian Williams as Bart Beeber
- Angelina Assereto as Marcie
- Sam Azouz as Uncle Walter

== Production ==
The filming took place in Hollywood, Florida. The film is a semi-autobiographical story inspired by Hecker's life growing up as a nerd in South Florida. Hollywood Hills High School was used for the shooting of some scenes in the film. This movie marked the first time that Alia Shawkat, Dinah Manoff, and Michael Mantell have worked together since their appearances on the 2001-2002 TV series State of Grace.

== Reception ==
Bart Got a Room won "Best of Fest" awards at the Fort Lauderdale International Film Festival, the Asheville Film Festival, and the Chicago Gen Art Film Festival. On the review aggregator website Rotten Tomatoes, 69% of 36 critics' reviews are positive, with an average rating of 6.2/10. The website's consensus reads: "Just enough sweetness and good performances lighten up the high school-set tensions, creating a family-appropriate teen comedy." Metacritic, which uses a weighted average, assigned the film a score of 57 out of 100, based on 8 critics, indicating "mixed or average" reviews.

Greg Quill of the Toronto Star called the film "an affectionately nuanced comedy of manners", praising its "warm sensibility" reminiscent of Woody Allen's Radio Days, "judicious editing and superbly controlled performances", concluding that: "Bart Got A Room avoids most of the clichés of the genre, it also avoids the predictable denouement. The off-the-kilter final act is a brave, heart-warming surprise." Betsy Sharkey of the Los Angeles Times felt that Hecker was ill-equipped when directing Macy and Hines, saying she felt the latter was "underused" in her role. She later wrote that he does a better job with Kaplan and Shawkat, finding the former "engaging" and doing "a good job with giving his character the naiveté and desperation of a kid hoping to change what seems to be the "loser" setting of his life." Jeannette Catsoulis of The New York Times wrote that despite Hecker capturing "knowing images" of Florida, she criticized his "antiquated" screenplay for lacking "freshness" in its given genre and giving his cast limited "caricature" parts, concluding that Tilly's five-minute cameo reminds viewers that "comedy without risk is as barren as a prom without a theme." Susan G. Cole, writing for NOW, felt that Hecker made a mistake when taking the farcical path instead of the broad route when telling his teen comedy story with "unlikeable caricatures", saying, "[T]his indie pic demonstrates that a great setting, strong cast and decent premise won't save a bad script." John Semley of Exclaim! felt the film was another Napoleon Dynamite facsimile that bypasses "funniness in favour of stylized quirkiness" for its content, criticizing its thin awkward charm, "mean-spirited" and "adolescent" jokes, and portraying itself as "an ugly, ersatz colouring book version of real life." Ed Gonzalez of Slant Magazine criticized Hecker's "wafer-thin story" for being a "banal, half-sketched cartoon" filled with offensive humor and teen comedy clichés, concluding that Macy's portrayal of his character's "cornily scripted eccentricity" felt believable and he escapes "largely unscathed by sheer force of will."

== Soundtrack ==
In the opening sequence, the film features the song "Sing Sing Sing", played by the Hollywood Hills High School Band at the Hollywood Beach Bandshell.
