= Prison Break: Proof of Innocence =

- Intertitle
- Genre: Action; Thriller; Drama
- Created by: Eric Neal Young
- Starring: Mandell Maughan
- Theme music composer: Ramin Djawadi
- Composer: John Massari
- Country of origin: United States
- Original language: English
- No. of seasons: 1
- No. of episodes: 26

Production
- Running time: 2 minutes per episode

Original release
- Network: Sprint Nextel

Related
- Prison Break

Prison Break: Proof of Innocence is a low-budget spin-off series of the American television series, Prison Break. Made exclusively for mobile phones, its first episode was published on May 8, 2006. Due to the success of the Fox network's television series Prison Break, the release of this mobile series was an exclusive deal made between Toyota and News Corporation's Fox network, allowing Toyota to sponsor exclusive content of the show and to obtain advertising exclusivity.

Each episode is approximately 2 minutes long. This series revolves around the conspiracy that put Lincoln Burrows in jail, but does not feature any of the actors or writers from the TV series, and the TV series does not acknowledge the events of this spin-off. It follows the character Amber McCall as she attempts to uncover evidence to exonerate her friend, L.J. Burrows. This mobile series is produced by Eric Young, who also produced the 24: Conspiracy, 24's mobile series.

== Promotion ==
The episodes advertise the Toyota Yaris. A ten-second advertisement of the car is shown at the beginning, and the car is incorporated into each episode. These are part of a campaign titled "Yaris vs. Yaris", inspired by Mad magazine's "Spy vs. Spy" with two endlessly duelling black hat and white hat spies. A total of eight different advertisements were featured in the series, which were re-used on subsequent episodes beyond the initial eight episodes.

== Distribution ==
Aside from broadcasts on Fox Mobile on mobile phones, the episodes are published on Toyota's Prison Break webpage. They were all included in the Prison Break Season 1 DVD set bundle at Target and Best Buy.

== List of episodes ==
Prison Break: Proof of Innocence was published in 26 episodes, on Toyota's Prison Break webpage on May 8, 2006.

Episode	Title	Release date
1	Proof	May 8, 2006
2	Deeper	May 8, 2006
3	Trust	May 8, 2006
4	Heat	May 8, 2006
5	Insight	May 29, 2006
6	Ally	May 29, 2006
7	Closer	May 29, 2006
8	Switch	May 29, 2006
9	Contingency	June 2006
10	Abduction	June 2006
11	Visit	June 2006
12	Interrogation	June 2006
13	Panic	June 2006
14	Flush	June 2006
15	Trapped	June 2006
16	Escape	June 2006
17	Chase	July 2006
18	Evade	July 2006
19	Guidance	July 2006
20	Battle	July 2006
21	Consequences	July 2006
22	Wrinkle	July 2006
23	Freedom	July 2006
24	Reunited	July 2006
25	Busted	July 2006
26	Horizon	July 2006

== Cast ==
- Mandell Maughan as Amber McCall
- John Patrick Jordan as Rob McCall
- Dheeaba Donghrer as Buzz
- Donn C. Harper as Detective Franklin
