= Harford Lutheran School =

Former private secondary school in Bel Air, Maryland, US

Location
- Bel Air, Maryland; United States
- 39°30′48″N 76°19′44″W

Information
- Type: Private secondary
- Established: 2002
- Status: Closed
- Closed: 2009
- Headmaster: Randall Gast
- Grades: 6–12
- Enrollment: 110
- Campus: Suburban
- Colors: Blue and white
- Mascot: Knights

Harford Lutheran School was a private secondary school located in Bel Air, Maryland, United States.

The school was operated by the Baltimore Lutheran High School Association, an association of Lutheran churches in the Baltimore area. The association opened its first campus, Baltimore Lutheran School, in suburban Towson in 1965. Population movement to Harford County and growth of the Towson campus caused the association to open a second campus in 2002.

Harford Lutheran School had students from grades 6 through 12. It closed in June 2009, with only one class having graduated.
