= Sabina K. =

Sabina K. is a Bosnian feature film written and directed by Cristóbal Krusen which premiered at the Sarajevo Film Festival in 2015. It is inspired by a true story in the aftermath of the war in Bosnia and Herzegovina in the 12 months beginning January 2004.

== Synopsis ==
Sabina K. is inspired by a true story set in Bosnia and Herzegovina. The "Sabina" of the title plans to marry Saša (with whom she served during the Bosnian War), but there is a problem. Sabina is Muslim and Saša a Catholic, and their respective families disapprove of the marriage. Their only ally is an older woman, Ankica, whose son - killed in the war - had been their close friend. "Aunt" Ankica thinks of Sabina and Saša as her children and invites them to her home on the island of Korčula to get married.

Springtime comes and Sabina travels to Korčula where she is reunited with Ankica and where the two women wait for Saša to join them from Zagreb. The days pass, Saša never arrives, and Sabina returns to Sarajevo with a heavy and troubled heart. She discovers that Saša has taken all his things from her apartment and moved out. There is no note; no explanation. Sabina goes to Saša's mother for answers, but the deeply embittered woman treats her harshly and calls the police. Mysteriously, inexplicably, the love of Sabina's life is gone and she doesn't know where or why.

A few weeks later, Sabina passes out on the job. She goes to the doctor and learns that she is pregnant. Her parents and friends counsel her to have an abortion and put the past behind her, but she refuses. As her pregnancy advances and winter approaches, Sabina loses her job and when her ex-husband tries to shake her down for money by threatening to take the children away permanently, she comes to a breaking point. Love has failed her, and she decides to take her life.

Sabina survives her suicide attempt and spends several days in the hospital. While there, she is visited by her landlady, who informs her that since her lease will end in another week, she has decided to rent out Sabina's apartment to another family. Feeling abandoned by family and friends, and without help from social services, Sabina wanders the streets of Sarajevo in the cold of winter. There are no solutions... there is no refuge... and Sabina again makes plans to take her life. She sells the last of her jewelry and surreptitiously buys three times the amount of sleeping pills used in her previous suicide attempt. She checks into a room at a motel and swallows the pills, slipping into unconsciousness.

What happens next is subject to an opinion... But one thing becomes clear. Sabina will never be the same.

== Reception ==
The Australian Christian Channel wrote a favorable review for the movie, stating that "Sabina K is an impacting, must-see film which journeys through a road of emptiness to reveal the treasures of what matters most."
