= Prison Break (soundtrack) =

Soundtrack album by Ramin Djawadi
- Released: August 27, 2007
- Recorded: 2005–2007
- Genre: Soundtrack
- Length: 63:31
- Label: Varèse Sarabande
- Producers: Ramin Djawadi; Robert Townson; Robert Kraft; Jacquie Perryman; Carol Farhat

Ramin Djawadi soundtrack chronology
| Prison Break (2007) | Iron Man (2008) |

Prison Break is the first soundtrack of the American television series Prison Break, composed by Ramin Djawadi, and was released in 2007, bringing together the music used for seasons 1 and 2. Released in August 2007, the album includes 31 songs composed specially for seasons 1 and 2 of Prison Break, although several of these titles were included in the following seasons.

The album contains only the creations of Ramin Djawadi; as such, all other music or songs used in the series are not present. "Main Titles" was nominated for a Primetime Emmy Award in 2006.

== Track listing ==
All music by Ramin Djawadi.

| No. | Title | Length |
|---|---|---|
| 1. | "Main Titles" | 2.29 |
| 2. | "Strings of Prisoners" | 1.27 |
| 3. | "Inking the Plan" | 2.37 |
| 4. | "Save a Brother's Life" | 1.52 |
| 5. | "In the Yard" | 1.45 |
| 6. | "T-Bag's Coming For Dinner" | 1.43 |
| 7. | "Sucre's Dilemma" | 2.26 |
| 8. | "Sarah & MichaelNote 1" | 1.43 |
| 9. | "Abruzzi Is the Ticket" | 1.57 |
| 10. | "In the Tunnels" | 2.56 |
| 11. | "Unconditional" | 2.19 |
| 12. | "Conspiracy" | 2.41 |
| 13. | "Sarah" | 2.44 |
| 14. | "C-Note" | 2.07 |
| 15. | "An In-Be-Tweener" | 3.12 |
| 16. | "Prison Break" | 3.33 |
| 17. | "The Manhunt Begins" | 2.15 |
| 18. | "Special Agent Mahone" | 1.23 |
| 19. | "Veronica Is Murdered" | 1.49 |
| 20. | "Linc & L.J." | 2.04 |
| 21. | "Stand-Off" | 1.58 |
| 22. | "Cat & Mouse" | 1.33 |
| 23. | "Classified" | 2.02 |
| 24. | "Remorse" | 2.30 |
| 25. | "Origami" | 1.03 |
| 26. | "Escape Is Just the Beginning" | 2.11 |
| 27. | "Panama" | 1.21 |
| 28. | "Maricruz" | 1.09 |
| 29. | "Execution" | 1.49 |
| 30. | "Trouble in Paradise" | 1.18 |
| 31. | "Sona" | 1.35 |
| Total length: | | 63:31 |

== Credits and personnel ==
Personnel adapted from the album liner notes.

- Tom Berg – Tattoo Art
- Tompa Berg – Tattoo Art
- Tom Cavanaugh – Music Business Affairs
- Ramin Djawadi – Arranger, Audio Production, Composer, Primary Artist, Producer
- Carol Farhat – Music Production Supervisor
- David Klotz – Music Editor
- Robert Kraft – Executive in Charge of Music

- Erick Labson – Mastering
- Matthew Joseph Peak – Package Design
- Jacquie Perryman – Executive in Charge of Music
- Rob Simon – Compilation Producer, Technical Score Advisor
- Michelle Silverman – Music Supervisor
- Robert Townson – Executive Producer
