= Cristóbal Krusen =

American filmmaker and author

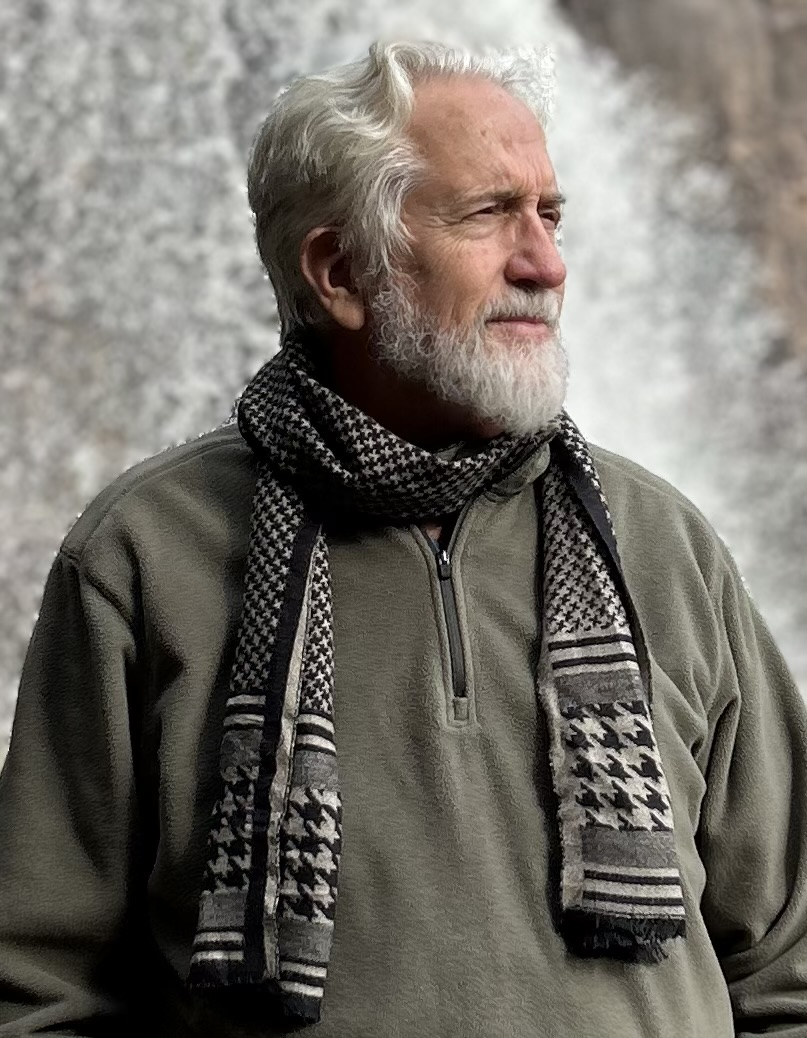
- Cristóbal Krusen

Cristóbal Krusen is an American filmmaker and author. His early films were produced in Spanish in Latin America, including Ropa Nueva para Felipe (1990) and ¿Con Quién Te Vas? (1995) followed by feature films produced in Africa, Asia, and Europe. These include the noteworthy Final Solution (2001) and Sabina K. (2015), which was a finalist for Bosnia’s official entry at the 2016 Oscars. His most recent film, Let Me Have My Son, was released in 2023.

== Early life ==
Krusen was born Christopher Barron Krusen in Tampa, Florida, the son of Margo Sauer and aviation pioneer Bill Krusen. Krusen’s mother was from New Mexico of Hispanic descent and Krusen grew up speaking both English and Spanish. Upon matriculating at Harvard, Krusen majored in English Literature, intending to pursue a career as a novelist and poet. A growing interest in photography and the history of cinema, however, led him to simultaneously explore filmmaking as a possible future career.

Eventually Krusen changed his major and schools, graduating from New York University (BFA, Film and Television) in 1976. He promptly started working with Tele-Tactics, a small production company making commercials and industrial films; other work in the New York film industry followed for several years, culminating in experience at both directing and producing.

== Career ==
In the 1980s, Krusen founded Messenger Films as an outgrowth of his work on Spanish-language productions for U.S.-based relief agencies and international Christian ministries. He produced his first dramatic film, Ropa Nueva para Felipe (New Clothes for Felipe), under the new Messenger Films banner.

In 1989 Krusen earned his MFA at Art Center College of Design in Pasadena, California and has steadily produced and directed films since.

He is also an author and has written the books Undaunted for Tyndale Momentum and They Were Christians (Baker Books).

Sabina K. was shot on location in Bosnia and Herzegovina, and had its world premiere at the 2015 Sarajevo Film Festival, qualifying it for Oscar consideration in the Best Foreign Language Film category. In June 2016, Sabina K. won Best Picture and Best International Film at ICVM in Cincinnati, Ohio.

Let Me Have My Son (2023) is a fictionalized autobiographical retelling of Cristóbal's own experiences with his son Daniel's treatment for schizophrenia. The film was made to bring hope to other families dealing with the loss brought on by mental illness. While the film's central character, Ben Whitmore, Sr., must be satisfied with a vision of hope fulfilled, in real life Daniel Krusen was released into a group home shortly after the film's completion. The film has won numerous awards, including Best Feature Film at both the 2023 Indie House and Arts and Hearts Film Festivals.

Let Me Have My Son also marked Cristóbal's first appearance in the lead role of a major feature film. His performance as Ben Whitmore, Sr., earned him a nod as Best Actor at the 2022 ICVM Crown Awards.

== Filmography ==
- Let Me Have My Son (2023)
- Sabina K. (2015)
- Undaunted... The Early Life of Josh McDowell (2011)
- The Bill Collector (2010)
- First Landing (TV Movie) (2007)
- More Than Dreams (2006)
- Final Solution (2001)
- ¿Con Quién Te Vas? (1996)
- Rescatados del Infierno (TV Movie documentary) (1994)
- Ropa Nueva para Felipe (Short) (1990)
