= Antoni Stutz =

Swiss-German filmmaker and visual artist

Antoni Stutz is a Swiss/German filmmaker and artist.

Stutz directed and produced the neo-noir thriller Rushlights (2013). Starring Beau Bridges, Aidan Quinn, Josh Henderson, and Haley Webb, the film was an official selection at the Montreal World Film Festival, the Shanghai and Dallas International Film Festivals, and the Newport Beach Film Festival. A director's cut of Rushlights was released in 2016.

Stutz was executive producer alongside Academy Award-winning producer Fred Roos on the feature film Expired directed by Cecilia Miniucchi, starring Jason Patric and Samantha Morton. In 2007, the film premiered at the Sundance Film Festival and was included in the official selection of Cannes that same year. Patric won Best Actor for the film at the Stockholm International Film Festival.

Stutz served as producer on the feature No Place Like Rome, starring Stephen Dorff, which premiered at the 2025 Venice Film Festival, as well as executive producer on the film Life Upside Down, starring Bob Odenkirk for AMC Networks.

In 1997, he directed his first feature film the comedy/thriller, You're Killing Me (2003) starring Julie Bowen (Modern Family).

Stutz is currently developing his next feature film which he will direct.

Born and raised in Germany to Swiss parents, Stutz's father Hans-Joachim Stutz was an architect and an executive director of HPP (1974-2000) one of the most prolific and best-known architectural firms in Germany.

Stutz graduated from college in Germany with an emphasis on Fine Arts. He continued his education in the United States at the Lee Strasberg Theatre Institute, both in Los Angeles and New York, under the direction of Anna Strasberg. At the same time he immersed himself in film studies at UCLA.

Stutz began his career as an actor in his teens. Early television roles included Tour of Duty and Michael Mann's Crime Story.

His first feature film role was in John Frankenheimer's Dead Bang co-starring Don Johnson, Penelope Ann Miller and William Forsythe.

Stutz worked as a freelance director on commercials and music videos including MTV's iconic “ROCK THE VOTE” campaign.

Stutz has exhibited his paintings, photography and multi-textural installations both nationally and internationally in museums and galleries. His first solo art show was in 2005 at Bergamot Station followed by an exhibit in 2006 at the Riverside Art Museum, curated by American art critic Peter Frank. In 2014, Stutz's work was presented at the Irvine Fine Arts Center followed by a show in 2016 at BerlinArtProjects Gallery in Berlin, Germany.

His most recent work, described by Peter Frank as "Sculptural Pop-Cubism," was presented at the Palace of Fine Arts in San Francisco at the 2018 inaugural If So, What international art fair.

In 2019 Stutz unveiled a large multi-textural artwork installation at DENK Gallery in Downtown Los Angeles in the "UltraChrome Plus" exhibit July 20 - September 7, 2019. His show on February 22 – April 11, 2020 also at DENK entitled “Heavy Metal” was an introduction of Stutz’ passion for abstract, modern sculpture. Stutz exhibited alongside artists such as Tim Hawkinson.
