= Leeches! =

- Directed by: David Decoteau
- Screenplay by: Michael Gingold
- Story by: Gary Barkin; David DeCoteau; Michael Gingold
- Produced by: Gary Barkin; David DeCoteau
- Starring: Matthew Twining; Josh Henderson; Stacey Nelson; Alexandra Westmore; Michael Lutz; Tony Carroccio; Charity Rahmer; Maya Parish; Stephen Sowan; Greg Lyczkowski; Mark Ian Miller; Trevor Harris; Julie Briggs; Tyler Sedustine; Mike Cole
- Cinematography: Gary Graver
- Edited by: Bruce Little
- Music by: John Massari
- Distributed by: Rapid Heart Pictures
- Release date: August 19, 2003
- Running time: 85 minutes
- Country: United States
- Language: English

Leeches! is a 2003 American direct-to-video horror film directed by David DeCoteau and starring Matthew Twining, Josh Henderson, Stacey Nelson and Alexandra Westmore.

== Plot ==
Members of a college swim team take anabolic steroids to enhance their performance. While on a daytrip to a local lake, a couple of the members pick up some leeches, which feed on the steroids in their blood. The leeches end up washed down a shower drain, where they grow to enormous size and return for more feedings.

Following the deaths of several members of the team and a college administrator, the few surviving team members and one of their girlfriends hatch a plan to kill off the monster leeches. They will draw them to the campus swimming pool by having one of the swimmers act as bait. Then they'll electrify the pool, electrocuting the leeches. Tragically, the team coach, who's been infected by a leech, attacks them, delaying the electrification just long enough to allow the leeches to kill one last swimmer. Finally the coach is subdued and the switch is thrown, frying the leeches.

As the film ends, a surviving swim team member, in true mad scientist fashion, is revealed to have had a hand in creating the leeches and is shown to have breeding stock left.
