= The Brotherhood (film series) =

- DVD cover for the 2001 film
- Directed by: David DeCoteau
- Country: United States
- Language: English

The Brotherhood is a series of homoerotic horror films directed by David DeCoteau. The first film in the series is also known as I've Been Watching You in the United Kingdom.

In 2005, DeCoteau released The Sisterhood, a horror film that utilizes a female version of the same formula.

== Premise ==
The premise of each film in the series is that a young man is either already interested in or is approached to join a fraternity and, along the way, discovers the existence of magic and the supernatural. The main character is drawn to the supernatural and magic, which can manifest as vampires, demons, or warlocks.

=== The Brotherhood ===
Chris Chandler and his new roommate Dan are students at Drake University, home to the secretive fraternity Doma Tau Omega. While he's uninterested in fraternities, Chris is convinced to attend a party at the DTO house by his new friend Megan. At the party, Chris is mesmerized by the fraternity's leader, Devon Eisley, and goes off alone with him. Once alone, Devon gets Chris drunk and the two drink each other's blood.

Chris's personality changes as he takes part in more parties at the DTO house and continues consuming the blood of others. This worries Dan, who breaks into the house to investigate. He discovers decades old photos of Devon, showing that he has been part of the fraternity since its early beginnings and has never aged. Dan leaves the home and is able to successfully convince Megan that Chris is in danger and needs to be rescued.

Back at the fraternity home Devon reveals that he is capable of eternal life as long as he places his soul in a new body every century and that Chris has been chosen as the new host body. Megan and Dan arrive at the house to save Chris, successfully battling their way through several fraternity members. However just as they reach the ceremonial room Megan turns on Dan, revealing that she was a decoy that has been working for Devon and has been for the past 70 years. She then threatens to kill Dan if Chris doesn't participate in the ritual. While everyone is focusing on the ritual, Dan manages to break free and kill Devon. This in turn results in the deaths of Megan and the other fraternity members, leaving Chris alive as he had never actually joined the fraternity. Now free from danger, the two leave the fraternity house.

=== The Brotherhood II ===
At the exclusive private school, Chandler Academy, a young warlock named Luc convinces three other students to be his followers. The three start resisting Luc's influence and learn that he plans to use them as a conduit to summon a powerful demon.

=== The Brotherhood III ===
A group of high-school role-players decide to spice up their sword and sorcery games with two things: breaking into the local school to use its maze of hallways, and utilizing "spells" from a magic book. What the role-players do not realize is that the spells are real. When read, they summon a powerful demon that begins hunting the players down, one by one.

=== The Brotherhood IV: The Complex ===
Lee Hanlon is an eager young cadet who was recently accepted at a prestigious naval academy. Hoping to further excel, he tries to join the elite society Black Skulls, unaware that it is infested with demons.

=== The Brotherhood V ===
A year after a mean-spirited prom prank turned deadly, the most popular students of Sunnydale High are summoned back for a surprise reunion, only to find themselves at the mercy of a relentless killer.

=== The Brotherhood VI ===
When a group of pledges arrive at a secluded cabin for their fraternity initiation, they are met by a blood-thirsty lumberjack.

== Films ==
- 2001: The Brotherhood (also known as I've Been Watching You in the United Kingdom)
- 2001: The Brotherhood II: Young Warlocks
- 2002: The Brotherhood III: Young Demons
- 2005: The Brotherhood IV: The Complex
- 2008: The Brotherhood V: Alumni
- 2008: The Brotherhood VI: Initiation

== Release ==
The films in The Brotherhood series have all been released as straight to home video films. The first film, The Brotherhood, was released in 2001 as a Blockbuster Video exclusive. DeCoteau has stated that the first film did well in rental sales at Blockbuster, as "it had a great box, it had a great concept, and it was basically supplying a market that was underserved." The first film was released in the United Kingdom as I've Been Watching You and it, along with the other films in the series, went on to air on Sky TV.

Five additional films were released in The Brotherhood series, bringing the total to six films as of 2010.

== Themes ==
Films in The Brotherhood series heavily feature themes of homosexuality and homoeroticism. Per Darren Elliott-Smith, the first film in The Brotherhood series was one of three DeCoteau films that fell into the reactionary "coming out" narrative where "the 'Newcomer' can be read as a sexually confused individual who is attracted by the erotic allure of the 'Monster group' who are coded as queer".

Writers for Bloody Disgusting have drawn comparisons between the series and the 2006 film The Covenant, stating that both heavily feature homoeroticism and that "their power lies in subverting the traditional male gaze associated with horror films and, as a result, objectifying the male bodies for the audience’s viewing pleasure".

== See also ==
- The Sisterhood, a 2004 film also by DeCoteau
