= Vidar the Vampire =

- Directed by: Thomas Aske Berg; Fredrik Waldeland
- Written by: Thomas Aske Berg; Fredrik Waldeland
- Produced by: John Iver Berg; Thomas Aske Berg; Fredrik Waldeland
- Starring: Thomas Aske Berg; Brigt Skrettingland; Kim Sønderholm
- Cinematography: John Iver Berg
- Edited by: Tommy Enervold Jørpeland
- Music by: Thomas Aske Berg
- Production companies: UFOh! Photon4 Film
- Distributed by: Dread Central Presents
- Release dates: 23 August 2017 (Norwegian International Film Festival); 7 September 2018 (Norway)
- Running time: 82 minutes
- Country: Norway
- Language: Norwegian
- Budget: NOK 500,000

Vidar the Vampire (also known as VampyrVidar) is a 2017 Norwegian comedy horror film directed by Thomas Aske Berg and Fredrik Waldeland, starring Thomas Aske Berg, Brigt Skrettingland and Kim Sønderholm.

== Cast ==
- Thomas Aske Berg as Vidar Hårr
  - Ruben Jonassen as Young Vidar Hårr
- Brigt Skrettingland as Jesus
- Kim Sønderholm as Psychologist
- Marit Sander as Kristin Hårr
- Martha Kristine Kåstad as Karin
- Henrik Rafaelsen as Pastor Tor Magne Abrahamsen
- Linda Tveiten as Drunk Cunt
- Ingvar Skretting as Pastor Arne Friestad
- Kathrine Junger Ims as Reporter

== Release ==
The film premiered at the Norwegian International Film Festival on 23 August 2017.

== Reception ==
Ian Sedensky of Culture Crypt gave the film a score of 70 out of 100. Nick Spacek of Starburst rated the film 6 stars out of 10, writing that the film "successfully combines all of the aspects of what came before, while definitely leaning into being a gorier, raunchier dark comedy. However, that raunchy aspect can really take the fun out of Vidar the Vampire." Christopher O'Keefe of ScreenAnarchy wrote a positive review of the film, writing that "While the sometimes shockingly perverse situational comedy doesn’t always sit well with the deeper themes the film explores, the steady flow of gasp inducing moments make it a consistently entertaining watch." Michael Gingold of Rue Morgue wrote a mixed review of the film, writing that the film "isn’t for every taste, and if some of its transgressions are more clever than others, it ultimately amuses more than it offends." Film critic Kim Newman wrote a mixed review of the film.
