= David Grove (disambiguation) =

David Grove (born 1935) is an American archaeologist, academic and Mesoamericanist scholar.

David Grove may also refer to:

- David Paul Grove (born 1958), Canadian actor and voice actor
- David Grove (Clean Language) (1950–2008), New Zealander psychotherapist
- David Grove (computer scientist), American computer scientist affiliated with IBM Research and University of Washington, see SIGPLAN
- David Grove (scriptwriter), American scriptwriter, wrote Beastly Boyz
