= Ring of Darkness =

- Directed by: David DeCoteau
- Written by: Ryan Carrassi; Michael Gingold; Matthew Jason Walsh
- Produced by: Sylvia Hess; Charles Arthur Berg (line producer); Paul Colichman; Andreas Hess; Stephen P. Jarchow (executive producers)
- Starring: Ryan Starr; Matt T. Baker; Adrienne Barbeau
- Music by: Ryan Starr; Jojo Draven
- Distributed by: DEJ Productions; Regent Worldwide Sales LLC (worldwide)
- Release dates: April 28, 2004 (AFM International Independent Film Festival)
- Running time: 89 minutes
- Language: English

Ring of Darkness is a 2004 fantasy horror film directed by David DeCoteau and starring Ryan Starr, Matt T. Baker, and Adrienne Barbeau.

Although never released into American theaters, the movie was released worldwide, and translated into several languages other than English, such as French, Spanish, Italian and German.

== Plot summary ==
The lead singer of boy band 'Take 10' vanishes. The band—which is secretly composed of zombie cannibals—conducts an American Idol type contest to find a replacement.

== Cast ==
- Colin Bain as B.J.
- Matt T. Baker as Jake
- Adrienne Barbeau as Alex
- Greg Cipes as Gordo
- Eric Dearborn as Max
- Jaclyn Gutierrez as Female assistant
- Josh Hammond as Lousy contestant
- Jonathan McDaniel as Coordinator
- Jeremy Jackson as Xavier
- Stephen Martines as Shawn
- Jeff Peterson as Jonah
- Margarita Reyes as Rebecca
- Ryan Starr as Stacy
- Mink Stole as Fletcher
- Irina Voronina as Amethyst
- Suzanne Whang as Television Reporter
- John Wynn as Kyle
- Jon Prutow as 1950s Boy Band Member
- Jamisin Matthews as 1980s New Wave band member
- Delno Ebie as 1950s Boy Band Member
- Michael Haboush as 1980s Band Member
- Murray SawChuck as 1980s Rock Roll Singer (Flashback)
- James Townsend as 1950s Boy Band Member

== Production ==
Filming for Ring of Darkness was completed in eight days, based on a script Ryan Carassi, Matthew Jason Walsh, and Fangoria editor Michael Gingold. Per DeCoteau, the film's premise had initially been completely different.

Adrienne Barbeau's character Alex was initially written for a man and DeCoteau had wanted the role filled by either Antonio Sabato, Jr. or Dolph Lundgren. The choice was made to make Alex a woman and Barbeau was brought in to portray the character.

== Reception ==
Ring of Darkness was reviewed by both Felix Vasquez Jr. of Cinema Crazed and Jon Condit of Dread Central, both criticizing the film for its acting and plot.

Per Darren Elliott-Smith, Ring of Darkness, along with DeCoteau's The Brotherhood and Ancient Evil: The Legend of the Mummy II, is an example of the reactionary "coming out" narrative where "the 'Newcomer' can be read as a sexually confused individual who is attracted by the erotic allure of the 'Monster group' who are coded as queer".
