= Prison of the Dead =

- Directed by: Victoria Sloane
- Screenplay by: Matthew Jason Walsh
- Produced by: Charles Band; Vlad Paunescu
- Starring: Patrick Flood; Jeff Peterson; Samuel Page; Kim Ryan; Michael Guerin; Alicia Arden; Debra Mayer
- Cinematography: Gabi Kosuth
- Edited by: Mircea Clocaliel
- Production company: Full Moon Entertainment
- Release date: August 22, 2000
- Running time: 73 minutes
- Country: United States
- Language: English

Prison of the Dead is a 2000 supernatural horror film with elements of a zombie film and a slasher directed by David DeCoteau under the pseudonym Victoria Sloane and produced by Charles Band. It follows a group of friends who unwittingly resurrect a trio of zombie prison executioners that systematically hunt them down.

== Plot ==
Twenty-somethings, Kristof, Michele, Allie, and Rory travel to their friend Calvin’s funeral at the remote Hawthorne Funeral Home, built atop the old Blood Prison. The group were high school friends and amateur Paranormal Investigators but have since found other interests. Blood Prison was a secret jail built by Puritan extremists specifically for the torture and execution of “witches and heretics” and remained in operation even after the practice of witch prosecution was outlawed. Part of the prison's dungeon remains below the current funeral home. Bill, Jeff and Kat, who know the group from school, also arrive at Hawthorne, planning on scaring them in retaliation for Kristof sleeping with Bill’s girlfriend.

Inside, Calvin reveals himself to actually be alive, having faked his death on Kristof’s account, who needed a surefire way to get the five together again. Kristof‘s father recently bought the Hawthorne and set up a contest—based on his own skepticism for paranormal investigators—to prove the existence of a local legendary supernatural item, the Talon Key. The backstory of the Talon Key is confusing but is explained by Kristof as follows: When the Puritans finally discovered the existence of Blood Prison, they were so appalled by the actions of the three prison executioners that they made a special cell to hold the executioners. He goes on to explain that they buried the executioners with key somewhere on the ground but it’s not specified where. The bodies and the key have never been found and this became known as the Talon Key. It supposedly unlocks an actual door under the funeral home, behind which is the evil the puritans locked away (they don’t explain the backstory any further). His father plans to charge admission to those who want to search the grounds for the key but Kristof intends to win the contest (which has a 1 million dollar prize) before it begins and validate himself in his father’s eyes, offering the $1million to the other four if they help him find the Key. The other four are skeptical but Kristof insists. they use a ouija board and Allie is temporarily possessed by a witch’s spirit but claims she’s fine afterwards while Bill, Jeff, and Kat try to set up their scare outside. Meanwhile, the ouija board resurrects the three executioners, Sickle, Mace, and Scythe, named here for the weapons they carry.

Calvin catches a glimpse of Jeff as he walks past a window so he and Kristof search the grounds, leaving Michele and Rory to watch Allie. Jeff is possessed by a witch & immobilized and Sickle decapitates him; Kat’s possessed and Scythe cuts her throat. Rory and Michele leave Allie instead and find the old caretaker’s bedroom to have sex and do cocaine. While alone, two executioners put Allie in metal shackles hanging from the ceiling. Calvin and Kristof have an argument and Kristof leaves to call their limo but reception is spotty. Calvin goes looking for the others and doesn’t notice Allie’s severed arms hanging from the ceiling. Mace and Sickle attack and kill him. Bill finds Kristof and it’s revealed that Kristof paid Bill to jump him in front of his friends but this is not ever fully explained . Rory and Michele have sex and after, while Rory showers, Mace kills Michele. Scythe cuts Rory’s throat when he leaves the shower.

Eventually, Bill and Kristof find Calvin’s bloody body in the coffin, thinking it’s a joke until Bill is possessed by a witch who tells Kristof he summoned their spirits, setting them free from the prison and the executioners now want him dead so the witch spirits cannot leave. Kristof runs off and Bill’s throat is cut by Sickle. Kristof is attacked by a zombie Calvin but is able to kill him again. All the other dead characters return as zombies and start chasing Kristof through the house. He manages to grab the Talon Key (hanging around the neck of Scythe) and opens the door in the old dungeon under the home. When he does this, the executioners and all his zombies friends fade away. Kristof walks outside and is greeted by the limo driver who asks if his friends enjoyed his prank...

== Cast ==
- Patrick Flood as Kristof St. Pierce, his father made millions in publishing, an only child and disowned by the rest of his family, he’s obsessed with the occult and supernatural
- Samuel Page as Calvin, Kristof and Rory’s best friend, he is bisexual and has an implied intimate relationship with Kristof. His parents resent the rest of them for “leading him” into the paranormal lifestyle, which they disapprove of
- Michael Guerin as Rory, Calvin and Kristof’s best friend, he is sarcastic and cynical but the others only take him half seriously
- Debra Mayer as Michele, carries a reputation of a party girl, has a cocaine habit and doesn’t consider the group the friends they once were
- Kim Ryan as Allie, mild tempered, she tries to keep the peace though succumbs to possession when they use the ouija board
- Jeff Peterson as Bill
- Alicia Arden as Cat
- Mac Fyfe as Jeff (uncredited)
- Claudiu Trandafir as Limo Driver (uncredited)
- Constantin Barbulescu as Chauffeur (uncredited)

== Production ==
By the time production on Prison of the Dead began, producer Charles Band had been making films at Castel Film Romania for nearly a decade. He moved the production of his films to the country following 1989’s Puppet Master. In 2011, director David DeCoteau detailed his work for Full Moon Features in Romania during the 1990s extensively in an episode of Cinema Conversations with Stephen P. Jarchow. After the success of Puppet Master III: Toulon's Revenge DeCoteau was put in charge of developing an erotic label for Full Moon, Torchlight Entertainment resulting in a position he described as "essentially the only staff director for Charles Band", where the expectation was that "every time [he] finished a movie, a new script would come out and [he] would start over". When asked if foreign films had any influence on his own style, the director had this to say in a 1999 interview prior to release of Prison of the Dead: "...In terms of foreign exploitation films, like the Tombs of the Blind Dead films and stuff like that which have kind of this Eurotrash quality. I try to incorporate that sometimes in the films that I make, especially the films I make in Romania..." This film was conceived from and idea developed by director David DeCoteau and screenwriter Matthew Jason Walsh originally under the working title ‘Creepies’ and was filmed on jail sets leftover from Highlander: Endgame.

== Release ==
Prison of the Dead was released on DVD and VHS, initially by Full Moon Home Entertainment on August 22, 2000 as a video premier. It was re-released on DVD in 2003 and has been included in at least 2 different DVD collections, with the most recent being in 2013.

The film was screened as part of the 13 episode series William Shatner's 'Full Moon Fright Night' that originally premiered on SyFy (then spelled Sci Fi) in 2002. In the episode, Shatner slowly transforms into a zombie himself over his interludes edited into the film.

== Reception ==
AllMovie did not recommend the film in a review written by Richard Gilliam, who noted that even the combined efforts of B-Movie icons producer Charles Band and director David DeCoteau (who is credited under his common Full Moon pseudonym, Victoria Sloan) could not save this film. The review criticizes the script for being full of uninspired dialogue and characters, “a nominal quest” and a lack of “any sort of plausible story”. Gilliam argues this creates a “fatal mistake”, resulting in a boring movie with interesting features.

TheSchlockPit.com gave the film a more positive review written by Matty Budrewicz, who calls it a “three star masterpiece” with the one criticism of the film being the overcomplicated mythology full of “confusing extra padding like witches, possession, and some weird key”. The highlight of the film is DeCoteau’s visual style (particularly the design of the zombie executioners-a homage to Amando de Ossorio’s Tombs of the Blind Dead), which results in a film that’s a “slick, robust, and sustainedly ghoulish exercise in horror aesthetics”. Budrewicz goes on to praise the characters in the film, particularly Flood’s character Kristof St. Pierce, “a spoilt bisexual rich kid who seems to control his pals via money and sex”. He cites this as a testament to DeCoteau’s use of flawed lead characters and Flood’s “libertine charm” despite some “truly risible ‘mean teen’ dialogue”.

A review in The Zombie Movie Encyclopedia, Volume 2: 2000-2010 by Peter Dendle says, "The dreary dungeon drama was filmed in Romania, and probably the only interesting thing about it is that the producer was named Vlad. A DVD and Video Guide 2005 review states, "Director David DeCoteau's ode to the old Spanish Blind Dead movies is a fun-filled frightfest as a Dim crew unleashes the guards that he buried in the grounds of the old prison in which they are filming".
