= Dead Bang =

1989 film by John Frankenheimer

- Theatrical release poster
- Directed by: John Frankenheimer
- Written by: Robert Foster
- Produced by: Stephen J. Roth; Robert L. Rosen
- Starring: Don Johnson; Penelope Ann Miller; William Forsythe; Bob Balaban; Tim Reid
- Cinematography: Gerry Fisher
- Edited by: Robert F. Shugrue
- Music by: Gary Chang
- Production company: Lorimar Film Entertainment
- Distributed by: Warner Bros. Pictures
- Release date: March 24, 1989 (United States)
- Running time: 105 minutes
- Country: United States
- Language: English
- Budget: $14.5–$15 million
- Box office: $8.1 million (North America)

Dead Bang is a 1989 American action thriller film directed by John Frankenheimer and starring Don Johnson, Penelope Ann Miller, William Forsythe, Bob Balaban, and Tim Reid. Johnson's character, based on real-life LASD Detective Jerry Beck, tracks the killer of a Los Angeles County Sheriff's Deputy and uncovers a plot involving hate literature, white supremacist militias and arms trafficking.

== Plot ==
On Christmas Eve in Los Angeles, a dispatched LASD Sheriff named Kimble is shot dead by an armed criminal, who robbed a convenience store and also killed its African-American owner minutes earlier. The alcoholic, hard-driven LASD Detective Jerry Beck is tasked with the investigation. While examining police records, he comes across a person of interest named Bobby Burns, who has recently been paroled from a four-year robbery sentence. He and parole officer Elliot Webley go to Burns' home only to find his college student brother, John, who claims he has not seen Burns and is only staying for the holidays. A man suddenly flees the house, and Beck captures him after a chase on foot; he turns out to be one of Burns' friends who is also on parole from committing armed robbery. The suspect tells Beck he last saw Burns driving a maroon Ford Ranch Wagon en route to Bakersfield.

In Cottonwood, Arizona, Burns and his cohort rob a Mexican bar and then murder the patrons in cold blood. The local police chief Hilliard informs Beck of the crime, and he immediately leaves for Arizona. Beck and Hillard navigate to a ranch alleged to be Burns' hideout, where Burns and his men attack the officers by firing automatic weapons; they retreat in their car. Beck obtains a cache of documents Burns dropped, which contains white supremacy propaganda, maps, and an address book. Beck leaves for Bogan, Oklahoma in an effort to track down one of the people listed in the book, Reverend Gebhardt, who is the leader of the religious white supremacist organization Aryan Nations. Beck is joined by FBI Special Agent Arthur Kressler, and they take off to Gebhardt's church, where Gebhardt reveals the entity's aim of cleansing America of its "racial impurities" and denies ever seeing Burns. The latter has been hiding near the church casing the place.

That night, Burns springs on Beck while driving his car, holding him at gunpoint. As Burns prepares to shoot him, Beck crashes his car into an oncoming police vehicle. During the shootout, Beck lights a matchbook and sets a car leaking gas on fire, causing Burns to escape with his men after the explosion. Meanwhile, in Los Angeles, Beck's superiors have become frustrated over his performance on the force due in part to his alcoholism and uncouth behavior. They recommend he undergo a psychiatric analysis; after the session, Beck threatens the counselor into letting him pass the evaluation. A phone call later that day informs him that he is now fit for duty.

In Boulder, Colorado, Beck meets Police Captain Dixon, who entrusts his team of black men on the force to track Burns. Along with Kressler, he and Dixon go to a paramilitary training camp owned by Aryan Nations and ambush Gebhardt and the other members. His search for Burns yields no results, which causes hostility between him and Kressler. Beck discovers a concealed door that leads to a bunker. In the ensuing gun battle, Beck manages to shoots Burns. As he dies from his wounds, Burns denies killing the Los Angeles cop. John suddenly emerges from behind them and, as he holds Beck and Kressler at gunpoint, confesses it was he who shot Deputy Kimble to show his brother that he shared his contempt against the police and fidelity to white supremacy. Beck hurls insults to John about his brother, and John reciprocates by opening fire, but when John runs out of bullets and springs from cover, Beck kills him.

At a press conference, Dixon informs that the FBI will be revising its position on white supremacy groups, and he credits Kressler with the success of the investigation due to the evidence that he gathered. Outside, Dixon and Beck befriend one another and go their separate ways.

== Cast ==
- Don Johnson as LASD Detective Jerry Beck
- Penelope Ann Miller as Linda Kimble
- William Forsythe as FBI Special Agent Arthur Kressler
- Bob Balaban as Elliott Webley
- Frank Military as Robert "Bobby" Burns
- Tate Donovan as John Burns
- Antoni Stutz as Ray
- Mickey Jones as Sleepy
- Ron Campbell as Crossfield
- William Traylor as Chief Elton Tremmel
- Hy Anzell as Captain Waxman
- Michael Jeter as Dr. Alexander Krantz
- James B. Douglas as Agent Gilroy
- Brad Sullivan as Chief Hillard
- Tim Reid as Chief Dixon
- Michael Higgins as Reverend Gebhardt

== Production ==
"Jerome Beck" is listed in the film's closing credits as walk-on character Detective John, and also as the film's technical police advisor. Beck was a Los Angeles County Sheriff's Department detective who sold the film rights to his life to Frankenheimer after meeting him. Don Johnson later recalled:

That was amazing, because it was a real-life character. It was an actual cop, and he wrote the script. John Frankenheimer was the director... and I was excited to work with him. Jerry was a homicide cop in L.A., and he had curly hair, so I permed my hair, which was a, uh, very interesting choice. Because I kind of looked like a… It's kind of odd. I don't really know how to describe it. I don't know if you know a lot about perms, but if you do them, they relax after about two or three weeks. So my hair goes through these amazing transitions of being really tight and really wavy and sort of goofy-looking. [Laughs.]

According to director Frankenheimer, Connie Sellecca was originally chosen for the part that went to Penelope Ann Miller. Johnson refused to work with Sellecca, so she was fired and paid off.

Production was designed by Ken Adam. Director of Photography was Gerry Fisher. Music was by Gary Chang.

Principal photography began on April 14, 1988, in Alberta. Shooting locations included Calgary, Drumheller, and High River. The final three weeks of filming took place in Los Angeles.

== Reception ==
On the review aggregator website Rotten Tomatoes, 38% of 13 critics' reviews are positive.
