= Michelle Borth =

American actress (born 1978)

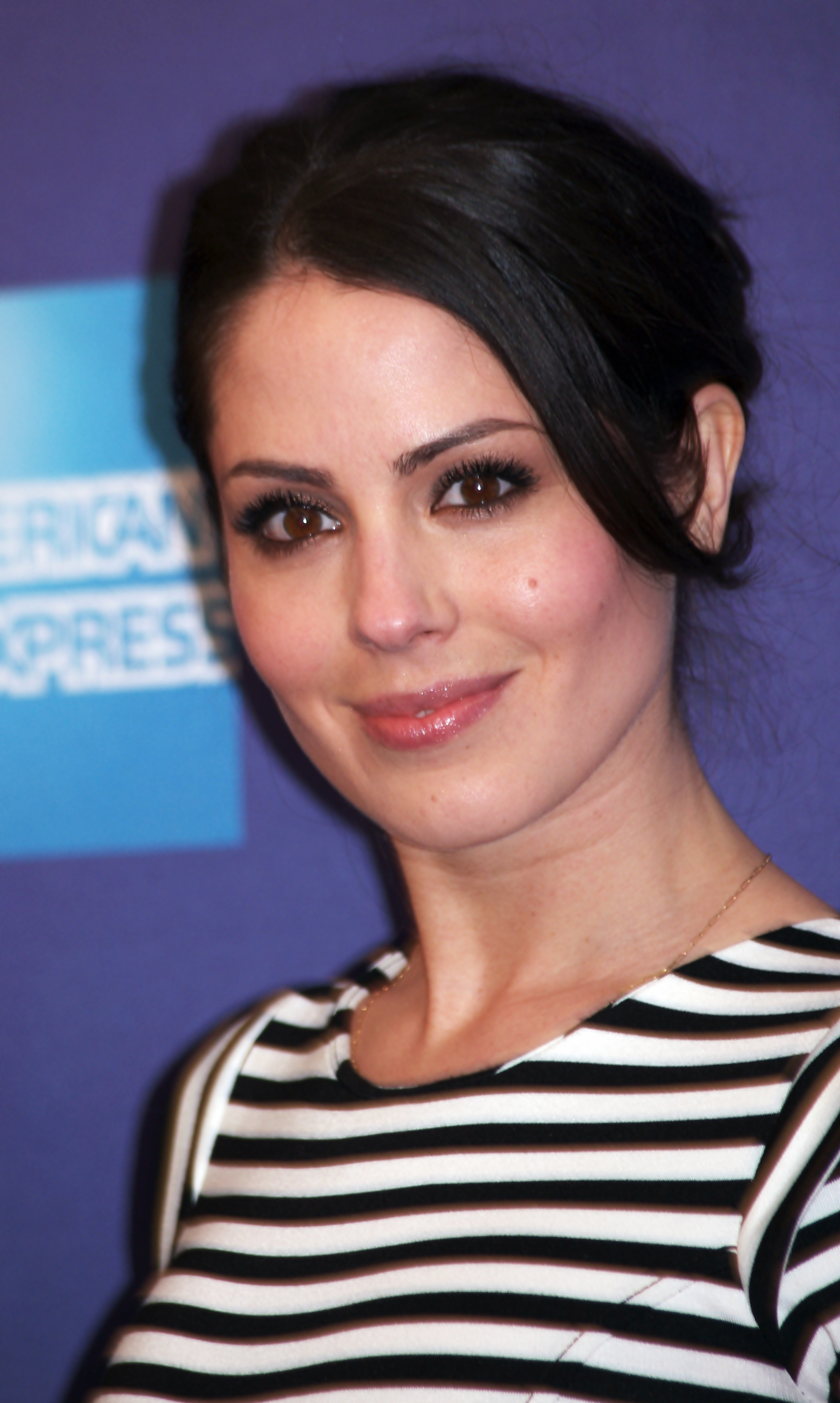
- Borth at the 2011 Tribeca Film Festival premiere of A Good Old Fashioned Orgy
- Born: New York City, New York, U.S.
- Education: Pace University (BFA)
- Occupation: Actress
- Years active: 2002–present

Michelle Teresa Borth is an American actress who has portrayed characters on The Forgotten and the HBO series Tell Me You Love Me. Borth played Catherine Rollins on the CBS crime-drama Hawaii Five-0.

== Early life and education ==
Borth was born in Secaucus, New Jersey, and grew up in New York City. Her mother is of Italian origin, and owns a home improvement business. She has two younger brothers. She aspired to become a gymnast but later discovered acting at a camp. She matriculated at Pace University, receiving a Bachelor of Fine Arts in Theater and Art History in 2001.

== Career ==
Borth's previous credits include the films Wonderland, Trespassers, The Sisterhood, Silent Warnings, Rampage: The Hillside Strangler Murders, and Komodo vs. Cobra; and guest appearances on the Supernatural episode "What Is and What Should Never Be" and the Law & Order: SVU episode "Trade". She also appeared in Burger King's "Lunch Break" advertising campaign. She was also featured in John Mayer's "Bigger than My Body" video.

In 2008, she wrapped the independent film TiMER with Emma Caulfield and Desmond Harrington, and appeared in the Endgame Productions comedy film, A Good Old Fashioned Orgy with Leslie Bibb, Lake Bell, and Jason Sudeikis. In 2009, she was a cast member of ABC's The Forgotten, appearing in 17 episodes, including part of the 2010 season. In 2010, she also guest starred on the TNT TV series Dark Blue double-episode season finale.

In 2010 Borth appeared in the 2010 version of Hawaii Five-0 on CBS where she appeared as Steve McGarrett's on and off girlfriend, Lt. Catherine Rollins, a Navy Lieutenant. On March 26, 2012, CBS announced that Borth would become a cast regular on Hawaii Five-0 for seasons 3 & 4. On March 27, 2014, it was announced that she would not be returning for the fifth season, with the reason for her departure left unknown. However, she would return in the show's 5th-season finale as a guest star. In July 2015 it was announced that Borth would have a recurring role in the first three episodes of the show's 6th season. On September 8, 2016, it was announced that Borth would be returning as a guest for the show's 150th episode. On March 19, 2018, it was announced that Borth would once again be returning to the series as a guest star for the eighth season's twentieth episode.

Borth starred as Canadian Forces surgeon Major Rebecca Gordon on Global's 2011 Canadian drama television series Combat Hospital, which was cancelled after its first season. She appears in the 2019 film Shazam! playing the adult version of Mary Bromfield.

== Filmography ==
=== Film ===
Year	Title	Role	Notes
2002	In Your Face	Brittany Jarvis	
2003	Silent Warnings	Katrina Munro	Direct-to-video film
2003	Wonderland	Sonia	
2004	The Sisterhood	Devin Sinclair	Direct-to-video film
2006	Rampage: The Hillside Strangler Murders	Nicole	Direct-to-video film
2006	Trespassers	Ashley	
2007	Lucky You	Girlfriend of Josh Cohen	
2010	Timer	Steph DuPaul	
2011	A Good Old Fashioned Orgy	Sue Plummer	
2015	Easy Rider: The Ride Back	Vanessa Monteague	
2017	Teenage Cocktail	Lynn Fenton	
2019	Shazam!	Super Hero Mary	

=== Television ===
Year	Title	Role	Notes
2002	Off Centre	Carly	Episode: "P.P. Doc II: The Examination Continues", October 10
2004	Center of the Universe	Peggy	Episode: "And the Silver Medal Goes To..."
2005	Komodo vs. Cobra	Dr. Susan Richardson	Television film
2005	Freddie	Nikki	Episode: "After Hours"
2007	Supernatural	Carmen Porter	Episode: "What Is and What Should Never Be"
2007	Tell Me You Love Me	Jamie	Main role
2008	Law & Order: Special Victims Unit	Avery Hemmings	Episode: "Trade"
2008	The Cleaner	Lisa	Episode: "Back to One"
2009–2010	The Forgotten	Candace Butler	Main role
2010	Matadors	Juliana Lodari	Television film
2010	Dark Blue	Sharon Perry	Episodes: "Personal Effects", "Dead Flowers"
2010–2016, 2018–2020	Hawaii Five-0	Lt. Catherine Rollins	Recurring role (seasons 1, 6); main role (seasons 3–4); guest role (seasons 2, 5, 7–10)
2011	Combat Hospital	Maj. Rebecca Gordon	Main role
2018	Devious Nanny	Elise	Television film; also known as The Au Pair
2020	No Good Deed	Karen	Television film; also known as No Good Deed Goes Unpunished
2021	The Christmas Thief	Lana Lawton	Television film
