= David DeCoteau =

American-Canadian film director and producer

- Born: January 5, 1962 (age 64); Portland, Oregon, U.S.
- Other names: Ellen Cabot; Julian Breen; Victoria Sloan; Richard Chasen; Jack Reed; Martin Tate; Joseph Tennent; Mary Crawford
- Occupations: Film director; film producer
- Years active: 1983–present

David DeCoteau /də koʊtoʊ/ (born January 5, 1962) is an American film director and producer.

== Early life ==
David DeCoteau was born on January 5, 1962, in Portland, Oregon, where he was raised. DeCoteau was an only child and was adopted at birth. His father was of Native American heritage.

DeCoteau's mother died of cancer when he was eight years old. As a teenager, DeCoteau developed a love for film, and worked as a theater projectionist beginning at age fifteen.

== Career ==
He has worked professionally in the movie business since he was 18. He got his start through Roger Corman, who hired him in 1980 as a production assistant at New World Pictures. In 1986, DeCoteau directed and produced his first feature film for Charles Band.

He is the founder of Rapid Heart Pictures, where his films include A Talking Cat!?! and the 1313 film series. He has said of his working methods, "I always wanted to make what I could sell. So I just promised myself that I would not be set in my ways. If somebody said, ‘Look, we need a horror film, we need a creature feature, we need a Western, we need a period costume drama,’ I was able to put it together pretty quickly."

Throughout his career, DeCoteau has been credited under a variety of pseudonyms: Ellen Cabot, Julian Breen, Victoria Sloan, Richard Chasen, Jack Reed, Martin Tate, Joseph Tennent, and Mary Crawford. DeCoteau revealed that he originally did not want his name to be associated with films that did not turn out as intended.

DeCoteau has directed 102 motion pictures between 1986 and 2014.

== Personal life ==
He resides in British Columbia and Los Angeles. DeCoteau is gay.

== Acting credits ==
=== Film ===
Year	Title	Role	Notes
1983	Angel	Jean Jacket Criminal in Line-Up	Uncredited
1983	Games	Dick McCabe	Uncredited
1984	Good Men Go Bad		
1989	Robot Ninja	Russ Mazzola	
1990	Crash and Burn	ILU Member	Uncredited
1993	Beach Babes from Beyond	City Worker	Uncredited
2003	Leeches!	Franklin / Walkie Talkie Voice	Uncredited
2008	Gingerdead Man 2: Passion of the Crust	Self	
2013	I Am Divine	Self	
2014	Trophy Heads	Juicy Stand Customer	
2014	Bigfoot vs. D.B. Cooper	Pilot	Voice role; credited as Ellen Cabot
2015	Evil Bong 420	Self	
2016	Evil Bong: High 5	Self	
2017	The Disaster Artist	David DeCoteau	Uncredited
2017	Puppet Master: Axis Termination	Flamboyant Nazi #1	
2019	Weedjies: Halloweed Night	Party Guest	
2020	Tales of the Uncanny	Self	

== Filmmaking credits ==
Year	Film	Director	Producer	Cinematographer	Writer	Notes	Ref.
1987	Creepozoids	Yes	Yes	No	Yes		
1988	Sorority Babes in the Slimeball Bowl-O-Rama	Yes	Yes	No	No		
1988	Nightmare Sisters	Yes	Yes	No	No		
1988	Lady Avenger	Yes	Yes	No	No		
1988	Assault of the Killer Bimbos	No	Yes	No	No		
1989	Murder Weapon	Yes	Yes	No	No	as Ellen Cabot	
1989	Robot Ninja	No	Yes	No	No		
1989	Ghost Writer	No	Yes	No	No		
1989	Assault of the Party Nerds	No	Yes	No	No		
1989	American Rampage	Yes	No	No	Yes		
1989	Dr. Alien	Yes	Yes	No	No		
1989	Deadly Embrace	Yes	Yes	No	No	as Ellen Cabot	
1989	Ghetto Blaster	No	Yes	No	No		
1990	The Girl I Want	Yes	Yes	No	No	as Ellen Cabot	
1990	Linnea Quigley's Horror Workout	No	Yes	No	No		
1990	Steel and Lace	No	Yes	No	No		
1990	Crash and Burn	No	Yes	No	No		
1990	Ghoul School	No	Yes	No	No	Uncredited	
1990	Skinned Alive	No	Yes	No	No		
1990	Puppet Master II	No	Yes	No	No		
1991	Puppet Master III: Toulon's Revenge	Yes	Yes	No	No		
1991	Trancers II	No	Yes	No	No		
1991	Zombie Cop	No	Yes	No	No		
1991	Beasties	No	Yes	No	No		
1991	Shock Cinema Vol. 1	No	Yes	No	No		
1991	Shock Cinema Vol. 2	No	Yes	No	No		
1991	Shock Cinema Vol. 3	No	Yes	No	No		
1991	Shock Cinema Vol. 4	No	Yes	No	No		
1991	Sorority Babes in the Dance-A-Thon of Death	No	Yes	No	No		
1992	Reanimator Academy	No	Yes	No	No		
1992	Redneck County Fever	No	Yes	No	No		
1992	Nightmare Asylum	No	Yes	No	No		
1992	Humanoids from Atlantis	No	Yes	No	No		
1992	Chickboxer	No	No	No	Yes		
1992	Zombie Rampage	No	Yes	No	No		
1993	Naked Instinct	Yes	Yes	No	No	as Ellen Cabot	
1993	Beach Babes from Beyond	Yes	No	No	No	as Ellen Cabot	
1994	Test Tube Teens from the Year 2000	Yes	No	No	No	as Ellen Cabot	
1995	Young Blood, Fresh Meat	Yes	Yes	No	No		
1995	Beach Babes 2: Cave Girl Island	Yes	Yes	No	No	as Ellen Cabot	
1995	Prehysteria! 3	Yes	No	No	No	as Julian Breen	
1996	Bikini Goddesses	Yes	Yes	No	No	as Ellen Cabot	
1996	Huntress: Spirit of the Night	No	Yes	No	No	Uncredited	
1996	Not Again!	No	Yes	No	No		
1996	Petticoat Planet	Yes	Yes	No	No	as Ellen Cabot	
1997	Prey of the Jaguar	Yes	No	No	No		
1997	The Journey: Absolution	Yes	No	No	No		
1997	Skeletons	Yes	No	No	No	TV movie	
1997	Leather Jacket Love Story	Yes	No	No	Yes		
1997	Lurid Tales: The Castle Queen	Yes	No	No	No	as Ellen Cabot	
1998	Shrieker	Yes	No	No	No	as Victoria Sloan	
1998	Curse of the Puppet Master	Yes	No	No	No	as Victoria Sloan	
1998	Talisman	Yes	No	No	No	as Victoria Sloan	
1998	Frankenstein Reborn!	Yes	No	No	No	as Julian Breen	
1999	The Killer Eye	Yes	No	No	No	as Richard Chasen	
1999	Teenage Alien Avengers	Yes	No	No	No		
1999	Witchouse	Yes	No	No	Yes	as Jack Reed	
1999	Totem	Yes	No	No	No	as Martin Tate	
1999	Retro Puppet Master	Yes	No	No	No	as Joseph Tennent	
2000	Ancient Evil: Scream of the Mummy	Yes	Yes	No	Yes		
2000	Voodoo Academy	Yes	No	No	No		
2000	Prison of the Dead	Yes	No	No	No	as Victoria Sloan	
2001	The Brotherhood	Yes	Yes	No	No		
2001	Micro Mini Kids	Yes	No	No	No	Uncredited	
2001	Final Stab	Yes	Yes	No	Yes		
2001	The Brotherhood II: Young Warlocks	Yes	Yes	No	Yes		
2002	The Frightening	Yes	Yes	No	No		
2002	The Brotherhood III: Young Demons	Yes	Yes	No	Yes		
2002	Wolves of Wall Street	Yes	No	No	No		
2003	Leeches!	Yes	Yes	No	Yes		
2003	Speed Demon	Yes	Yes	No	Yes		
2004	Ring of Darkness	Yes	No	No	No	TV movie	
2004	Tomb of Terror	Yes	No	No	No	Segment 3: "Evil Never Dies"	
2004	The Sisterhood	Yes	No	No	No		
2005	The Brotherhood IV: The Complex	Yes	No	No	No		
2005	Possessed	Yes	No	No	No	as Jack Reed	
2005	Killer Bash	Yes	No	No	Yes	TV movie	
2005	Witches of the Caribbean	Yes	No	No	No		
2005	Frankenstein & the Werewolf Reborn!	Yes	No	No	No	as Julian Breen	
2006	Beastly Boyz	Yes	Yes	No	Yes	TV movie	
2007	Grizzly Rage	Yes	No	No	No	TV movie	
2007	The Raven	Yes	Yes	No	Yes	TV movie	
2007	House of Usher	Yes	Yes	No	No		
2008	Playing with Fire	Yes	No	No	No		
2009	The Invisible Chronicles	Yes	No	No	No		
2009	The Brotherhood V: Alumni	Yes	No	No	No		
2009	The Brotherhood VI: Initiation	Yes	Yes	No	No		
2009	Alien Presence	Yes	No	No	No		
2009	Stem Cell	Yes	No	No	No		
2009	The Pit and the Pendulum	Yes	No	No	No		
2009	Nightfall	Yes	No	No	No		
2010	Puppet Master: Axis of Evil	Yes	No	No	No		
2010	Body Blow	Yes	Yes	Yes	Yes	TV movie	
2011	1313: Wicked Stepbrother	Yes	Yes	Yes	Yes		
2011	1313: Actor Slash Model	Yes	Yes	Yes	Yes		
2011	1313: Boy Crazies	Yes	Yes	Yes	Yes		
2011	1313: Haunted Frat	Yes	Yes	Yes	Yes		
2011	1313: Nightmare Mansion	Yes	Yes	Yes	Yes	AKA: A Dream Within a Dream	
2011	1313: Giant Killer Bees	Yes	Yes	Yes	No		
2011	Christmas Spirit	Yes	Yes	No	No	TV movie	
2011	Monty	No	No	Yes	No	Short film	
2012	The Magic Puppy	Yes	Yes	Yes	No	TV movie; AKA: A Halloween Puppy; as Mary Crawford	
2012	1313: Cougar Cult	Yes	Yes	Yes	Yes		
2012	1313: Bigfoot Island	Yes	Yes	Yes	Yes		
2012	Snow White: A Deadly Summer	Yes	Yes	Yes	No		
2012	1313: UFO Invasion	Yes	Yes	Yes	Yes		
2012	1313: Bermuda Triangle	Yes	Yes	Yes	Yes		
2012	1313: Billy the Kid	Yes	Yes	Yes	Yes		
2012	1313: Hercules Unbound!	Yes	Yes	Yes	Yes		
2012	1313: Night of the Widow	Yes	Yes	Yes	Yes		
2012	1313: Frankenqueen	Yes	Yes	Yes	Yes		
2012	2: Voodoo Academy	Yes	Yes	Yes	Yes		
2012	Immortal Kiss: Queen of the Night	Yes	Yes	Yes	Yes		
2013	Santa's Summer House	Yes	No	Yes	No	as Mary Crawford	
2013	A Talking Cat!?!	Yes	Yes	Yes	No	as Mary Crawford	
2013	An Easter Bunny Puppy	Yes	Yes	Yes	No	as Mary Crawford	
2013	Badass Showdown	Yes	Yes	Yes	Yes		
2013	A Talking Pony!?!	Yes	Yes	Yes	No		
2013	My Stepbrother is a Vampire!?!	Yes	Yes	Yes	No		
2013	Bonnie & Clyde: Justified	Yes	Yes	Yes	No		
2013	Hansel and Gretel: Warriors of Witchcraft	Yes	No	Yes	No		
2014	3 Scream Queens	Yes	Yes	Yes	No		
2014	Doc Holliday's Revenge	Yes	Yes	Yes	No		
2014	3 Wicked Witches	Yes	Yes	Yes	Yes		
2014	666: Kreepy Kerry	Yes	Yes	Yes	No		
2014	666: Devilish Charm	Yes	Yes	Yes	No		
2014	90210 Shark Attack	Yes	Yes	Yes	Yes		
2014	Bigfoot vs. D.B. Cooper	Yes	Yes	Yes	Yes		
2014	Spidora	No	Yes	No	No		
2014	Knock 'Em Dead	Yes	Yes	Yes	No		
2014	Stranded	No	No	No	No		
2016	The Wrong Roommate	Yes	Yes	No	No	TV movie	
2016	The Wrong Child	Yes	Yes	No	No	TV movie	
2016	Sorority Slaughterhouse	Yes	Yes	Yes	Yes		
2016	Asian Ghost Story	Yes	Yes	Yes	Yes		
2016	Bloody Blacksmith	Yes	Yes	Yes	Yes		
2016	A Husband for Christmas	Yes	Yes	No	No	TV movie	
2016	666: Teen Warlock	Yes	Yes	Yes	Yes	TV movie	
2016	Evil Exhumed	Yes	Yes	Yes	Yes		
2017	Deadly Lessons	Yes	Yes	Yes	No	TV movie	
2017	Swamp Freak	Yes	Yes	Yes	Yes		
2017	The Wrong Crush	Yes	Yes	No	No		
2017	Blood Dynasty	No	Yes	No	No		
2017	The Ugly Christmas Sweater	No	Yes	No	No	TV short	
2017	Runaway Christmas Bride	Yes	No	Yes	No	TV movie	
2017	Delivering Christmas	Yes	Yes	No	No	TV short	
2017	Runaway Christmas Bride	Yes	Yes	No	No		
2017	A Royal Christmas Ball	Yes	No	No	No	TV movie	
2017	A Christmas Cruise	Yes	Yes	No	No	TV movie	
2017	The Wrong Student	Yes	Yes	No	No	TV movie	
2017	The Wrong Man	Yes	Yes	No	No	TV movie	
2017	My Christmas Grandpa	Yes	Yes	No	No	TV short	
2017	Femaliens: Seduction of the Species	Yes	No	No	No	as Ellen Cabot	
2017	Witness Protection	Yes	Yes	Yes	No		
2018	The Wrong Cruise	Yes	Yes	No	No	TV movie	
2018	The Wrong Friend	Yes	Yes	No	No	TV movie	
2018	Puppet Master: Blitzkrieg Massacre	Yes	No	No	No		
2018	The Wrong Teacher	Yes	Yes	No	No	TV movie	
2018	Bunker of Blood: Chapter 5: Psycho Slideshow	Yes	No	No	No		
2018	Bunker of Blood; Chapter 6: Zombie Lust: Night Flesh	Yes	No	No	No		
2019	My Mother's Stalker	Yes	Yes	Yes	No		
2019	The Wrong Stepmother	Yes	Yes	No	No	TV movie	
2019	The Wrong Boy Next Door	Yes	No	No	No	TV movie	
2019	The Wrong Mommy	Yes	No	No	No	TV movie	
2019	The Wrong Tutor	Yes	Yes	No	No	TV movie	
2019	The Wrong Cheerleader	Yes	Yes	No	No	TV movie	
2019	Carole's Christmas	Yes	No	No	No	TV movie	
2019	Christmas Matchmakers	Yes	No	No	No	TV movie	
2020	The Wrong House Sitter	Yes	No	No	No	TV movie	
2020	The Wrong Wedding	Yes	No	No	No	TV movie	
2020	The Wrong Stepfather	Yes	No	No	No	TV movie	
2020	The Wrong Cheerleader Coach	Yes	No	No	No	TV movie	
2020	Christmas Together	Yes	No	No	No	TV movie	
2020	A Christmas for Mary	Yes	No	No	No	TV movie	
2021	The Wrong Real Estate Agent	Yes	No	No	No	TV movie	
2021	The Wrong Fiancé	Yes	No	No	No	TV movie	
2021	The Wrong Mr. Right	Yes	No	No	No	TV movie	
2021	The Wrong Prince Charming	Yes	No	No	No	TV movie	
2021	The Wrong Valentine	Yes	No	No	No	TV movie	
2021	Deceived by my Mother-In-Law	Yes	No	No	No	TV movie	
2021	Mommy's Deadly Con Artist	Yes	No	No	No	TV movie	
2021	Sinister Stepfather	Yes	No	No	No	TV movie	
2021	The Wrong Cheer Captain	Yes	No	No	No	TV movie	
2021-2022	Keeping up with the Joneses	Yes	No	No	No	7 episodes	
2022	The Wrong Blind Date	Yes	No	No	No	TV movie	
2022	The Wrong High School Sweetheart	Yes	No	No	No	TV movie	
2022	Killer Design	Yes	No	No	No	TV movie	
2023	Honeymoon in Paradise	Yes	No	No	No		
2023	If I Can't Have You	Yes	No	No	No	TV movie	
2023	As Luck Would Have It	Yes	No	No	No	3 episodes	
2023	A Christmas Intern	Yes	No	No	No	TV movie	
2024	The Wrong Life Coach	Yes	No	No	No	TV movie	
2024	Tall, Dark, and Dangerous	Yes	No	No	No	TV movie	
2025	The Wrong Obsession	Yes	No	No	No	TV movie	

== Awards and nominations ==
Year	Award	Category	Nominated work	Result	Ref
2008	GayVN Awards	Hall of Fame	—N/a	Won	
