= Rushlights (film) =

- Film poster
- Directed by: Antoni Stutz
- Written by: Antoni Stutz; Ashley Scott Meyers
- Produced by: Jeffrey Coulter; Gabriella Stollenwerck; Antoni Stutz
- Starring: Beau Bridges; Haley Webb; Josh Henderson; Aidan Quinn
- Cinematography: Gregg Easterbrook
- Edited by: Jane Pia Abramowitz; Michael Palmerio
- Music by: Bill Brown (International Version); Jeffrey Coulter (Domestic Version)
- Distributed by: Vertical Entertainment
- Release date: April 25, 2013 (Newport Beach)
- Running time: 98 minutes
- Country: United States
- Language: English

Rushlights is a 2013 American independent neo-noir thriller film written and directed by Antoni Stutz and starring Beau Bridges, Haley Webb, Josh Henderson and Aidan Quinn. Rushlights was included in the official selections of the Montreal World Film Festival, the Shanghai International Film Festival, the Dallas International Film Festival as well as the Newport Beach Film Festival. An extended directors cut was released in 2016.

== Plot ==
A dark and gritty mystery thriller, Rushlights centers on two delinquent young lovers from the suburbs of Los Angeles traveling to a small Texas town to falsely claim the inheritance of a dead friend. The teens, haunted by their dubious pasts, wind up in a nightmare of greed and betrayal as they encounter the twisted underworld of Tremo, Texas – population 2870.

== Cast ==
- Beau Bridges as Sheriff Brogden
- Haley Webb as Sarah
- Josh Henderson as Billy
- Aidan Quinn as Cameron Brogden
- Jordan Bridges as Earl
- Lorna Raver as Belle Brogden
- Joel McKinnon Miller as Sal Marinaro
- Crispian Belfrage as Eddie Romero
- Philip Lenkowsky as Sly Wheaton
- Eileen Grubba as Alice
- Terence Bernie Hines as Joe
- Nestor Absera as Jamie Albright

== Reception ==
Brandon Harris of Filmmaker magazine wrote: “An array of impressive performances… the film is reminiscent of John Dahl’s early 90s thrillers Red Rock West and The Last Seduction.”

Patrick Washington of The Dallas Weekly on Rushlights: “One of the best thrillers I’ve seen.” Mike Smith of Mediamikes gave the thriller 4/5stars writing: “Packed with genuine surprises and emotion… Stutz’s direction is clear and sharp.”

Debbie Lynn Elias of “Behind the Lens” wrote: "As Cameron Brogden, Aidan Quinn plays against type with such duplicitous effect to make one’s jaw drop when all the puzzle pieces fall into place. He amazes. An equal force to be reckoned with is Beau Bridges, who, as Sheriff Robert Brogden, does a balancing act of suspicious intrigue. But the scenes that really sizzle are Bridges and Quinn going toe-to-toe with “brotherly love.”

On Rotten Tomatoes the film has an audience Popcornmeter approval rating of 65% based on 250+ reviews and an approval rating of 28% based on reviews from 18 critics.
