= Silent Warnings =

2003 television film

- DVD cover art
- Also known as: Dark Harvest; Warnings
- Screenplay by: Christian McIntire; Bill Lundy
- Story by: Kevin Gendreau; Christian McIntire
- Directed by: Christian McIntire
- Starring: Stephen Baldwin; A. J. Buckley; Billy Zane; David O'Donnell; Michelle Borth
- Music by: Richard McHugh
- Country of origin: United States
- Original language: English

Production
- Cinematography: Lorenzo Senatore
- Editors: David Flores; Christian McIntire
- Running time: 87 minutes

Original release
- Network: Sci Fi Channel
- Release: May 3, 2003

Silent Warnings (also known as Dark Harvest) is a 2003 science fiction/horror television film about a group of college students who begin finding crop circles by the house they have moved into. Following the disappearance of one of them, they begin suspecting something sinister. It was commissioned by Syfy (then known as Sci-Fi Channel), written and directed Christian McIntire, and stars Stephen Baldwin, A. J. Buckley and Billy Zane. The project was released on DVD as Warnings by WL on June 23, 2003 and as Silent Warnings by Universal on August 26, 2003.

== Plot ==
After his cousin Joe (Stephen Baldwin) dies, Layne Vassimer (A. J. Buckley) and his girlfriend Macy (Callie De Fabry), along with their friends Stephen (David O'Donnell), Maurice (Ransford Doherty), Iris (Kim Onasch) and Katrina (Michelle Borth), decide to clean up Joe's house with the intention of selling it. When they see it for the first time, they discover the house completely covered in plates of iron armor.

The group also finds crop circles in the nearby cornfield. When Iris suddenly disappears, they realize something is really wrong. During a blackout, the house is attacked by aliens. The group figures out the aliens are allergic to iron, which is why Joe had covered the house in it to keep them out. They attempt to fight the aliens off, but the house is eventually blown up with Layne, Macy, and Katrina the only survivors.

In the end, they drive off, listening to the radio. They hear a news report stating that the blackout they experienced affects five western states and parts of Canada. They also hear that people everywhere are being attacked by "strange creatures."

== Cast ==
- Stephen Baldwin as Joe Vossimer
- A. J. Buckley as Layne Vossimer
- Billy Zane as Sheriff Bill Willingham
- David O'Donnell as Stephen Fox
- Michelle Borth as Katrina Munro
- Callie De Fabry as Macy Reed
- Ransford Doherty as Maurice Hall
- Kim Onasch as Iris Doyle

== Reception ==
Dread Central panned the film, beginning by comparing it to Signs and remarking that it was more a rip off of Roger Corman’s Carnosaur 2 rip-off of Aliens. The only differences found between this and Signs is that the farm family of Mel Gibson was replaced by bland teenagers, with a dash of T&A and gore. Considering it low-budget knock-off of a Hollywood blockbuster, the reviewer offered that a more appropriate title would have been Crap Circles.

Movie Gazette also noted the film is just M Night Shyamalan’s Signs remade on a budget. They noted it even had similar failings, in it "being a movie of two halves, and going downhill when it stops building tension and turns into an alien horror movie." When the aliens are finally revealed, they disappoint by being "rendered in almost cartoon fashion". Another flaw was that the film's two biggest star names have their talents wasted by being relegated to roles seen only briefly in the film. The only plus was while the ending was confusing, "it's better than that of Signs which was corny and obvious."
