= A Good Old Fashioned Orgy =

2011 film by Alex Gregory and Peter Huyck

- Theatrical release poster
- Directed by: Alex Gregory; Peter Huyck
- Written by: Alex Gregory; Peter Huyck
- Produced by: James D. Stern; Brian R. Etting
- Starring: Jason Sudeikis; Leslie Bibb; Lake Bell; Michelle Borth; Nick Kroll; Tyler Labine; Angela Sarafyan; Lindsay Sloane; Martin Starr; Lucy Punch; Will Forte
- Cinematography: John Thomas
- Edited by: Anita Brandt-Burgoyne; Patrick J. Don Vito
- Music by: Jonathan Sadoff
- Production company: Endgame Entertainment
- Distributed by: Samuel Goldwyn Films
- Release dates: April 29, 2011 (Tribeca Film Festival); September 2, 2011 (United States)
- Running time: 95 minutes
- Country: United States
- Language: English
- Budget: $5 million
- Box office: $1.4 million

A Good Old Fashioned Orgy is a 2011 American comedy film written and directed by Alex Gregory and Peter Huyck. It stars Jason Sudeikis, Leslie Bibb, Lake Bell, Michelle Borth, Nick Kroll, Tyler Labine, Angela Sarafyan, Lindsay Sloane, Martin Starr, Lucy Punch and Will Forte. The main plot follows Eric, who, having thrown parties at his father's house for years, decides to have one last party when the house is to be sold: an orgy.

The world premiere of A Good Old Fashioned Orgy was held at the 2011 Tribeca Film Festival in New York City on April 29, 2011. The film received a limited theatrical release in the United States on September 2, 2011.

== Plot ==
Eric (Jason Sudeikis) is a 30-something perpetual adolescent who lives to party, holding lavish theme events with his friends using his father's large house in the Hamptons. On July 3, Eric throws a bash party attended by his friends Sue (Michelle Borth), Adam (Nick Kroll), Mike (Tyler Labine), Laura (Lindsay Sloane), Kate (Lucy Punch), Glenn (Will Forte), Doug (Martin Starr) and his girlfriend Willow (Angela Sarafyan), Alison (Lake Bell) and her boyfriend Marcus (Rhys Coiro). Eric meets Kelly (Leslie Bibb) at the party. The following morning, Eric's father (Don Johnson) arrives and informs him that he is selling the house. The next weekend, the group arrives back at the house and finds it for sale by Dody (Lin Shaye) and Kelly.

Eric and Mike decide to throw a last ultimate party at the house on Labor Day weekend. Lamenting the more liberal sex attitude of the younger generation that passed over his own, Eric suggests having an orgy. When they present the idea to their friends, they are all reluctant, but when Mike and Eric argue that afterward, everyone will be moving away from each other and that this might be their last real time together, Sue agrees to join. Laura joins the plan to improve her self-esteem and is later joined by Alison after she breaks up with Marcus. Sue has feelings for Eric from high school, but Eric pursues a relationship with Kelly, to attempt to interfere with her selling the house. Doug and Willow join the orgy, hoping it will make him more confident. At Kate and Glenn's wedding, a drunken Adam reveals he has lost his job because Eric destroyed his phone at the bash, and agrees to join the orgy. Glenn finds out about the orgy and informs Kate, causing the pair to fall out with the group for not including them.

Eric and Mike go to an underground sex club to research orgies, and gain advice from Mike's uncle Vic (David Koechner). Later, during a date with Kelly, she asks Eric to meet with her friends on Labor Day, to which he reluctantly agrees. Eric admits to Mike that he is developing feelings for Kelly and is no longer sure about taking part in the orgy. The week before Labor Day, Kate and Glenn ask to join the orgy but the group refuses because the couple have a child. Kelly tells Eric that she has asked Dody to slow the house sale down until the end of the summer.

The Labor Day weekend arrives and the group prepare for the orgy. Doug decides to back out at the last minute, causing the group to descend into arguments, culminating when Alison publicly reveals Sue's feelings for Eric, and Doug accuses Mike of being Eric's "pet". Glenn and Kate arrive uninvited, intending to gatecrash the orgy, but they end up having sex in their car. Eric decides to leave and go to Kelly's home, but discovers she is on a date. Eric returns to the party where the group reconcile, and the orgy finally begins.

On Labor Day, Doug gives Mike a copy of his finished album, having finally found the confidence to pursue his music career. Sue gets over her feelings for Eric, Adam and Laura enter into a relationship, and Eric reconciles with Kelly. Kelly tells Eric that the house deal fell through and it will now take longer to sell. Eric begins planning a party for Memorial Day.

== Cast ==
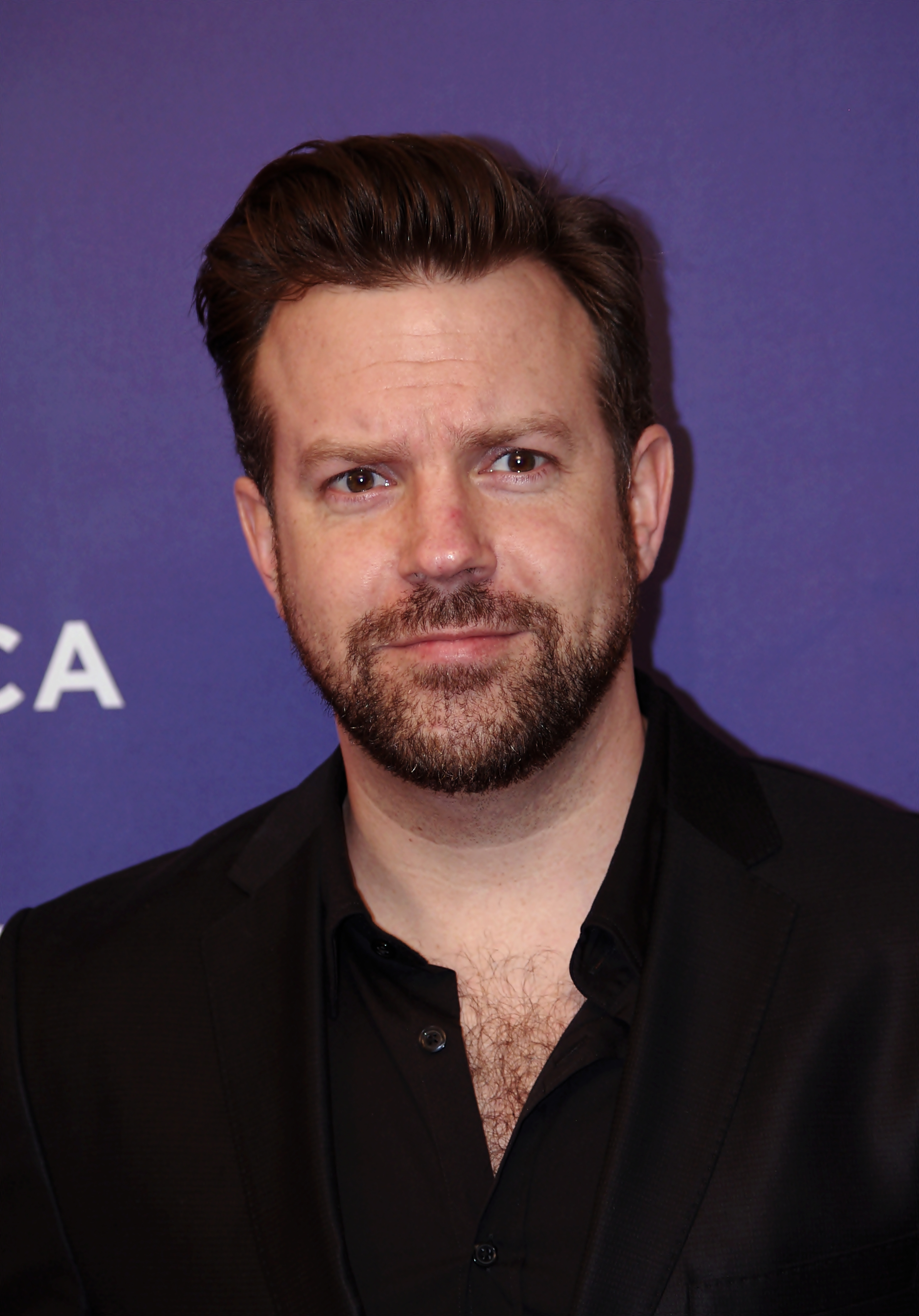
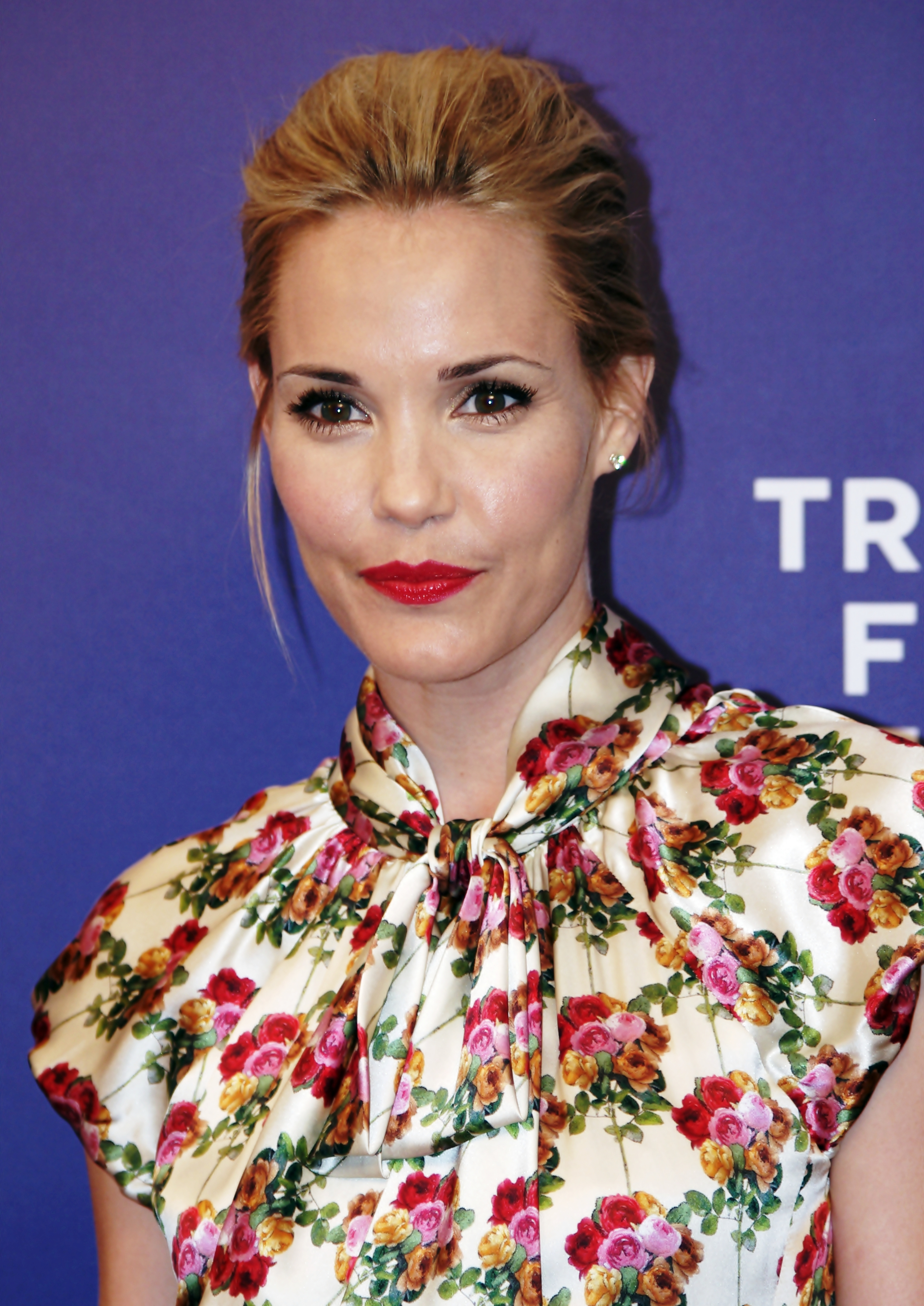
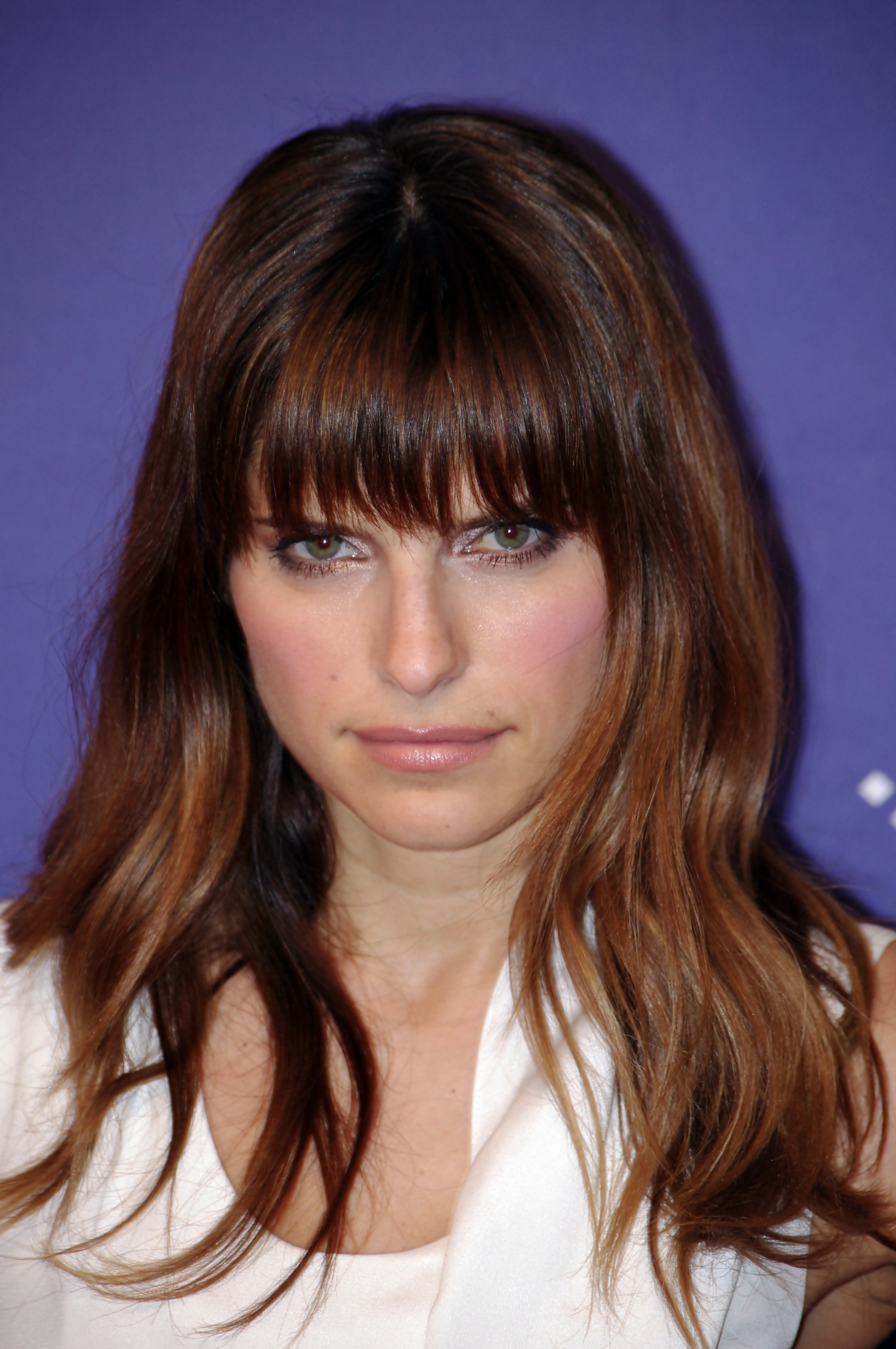
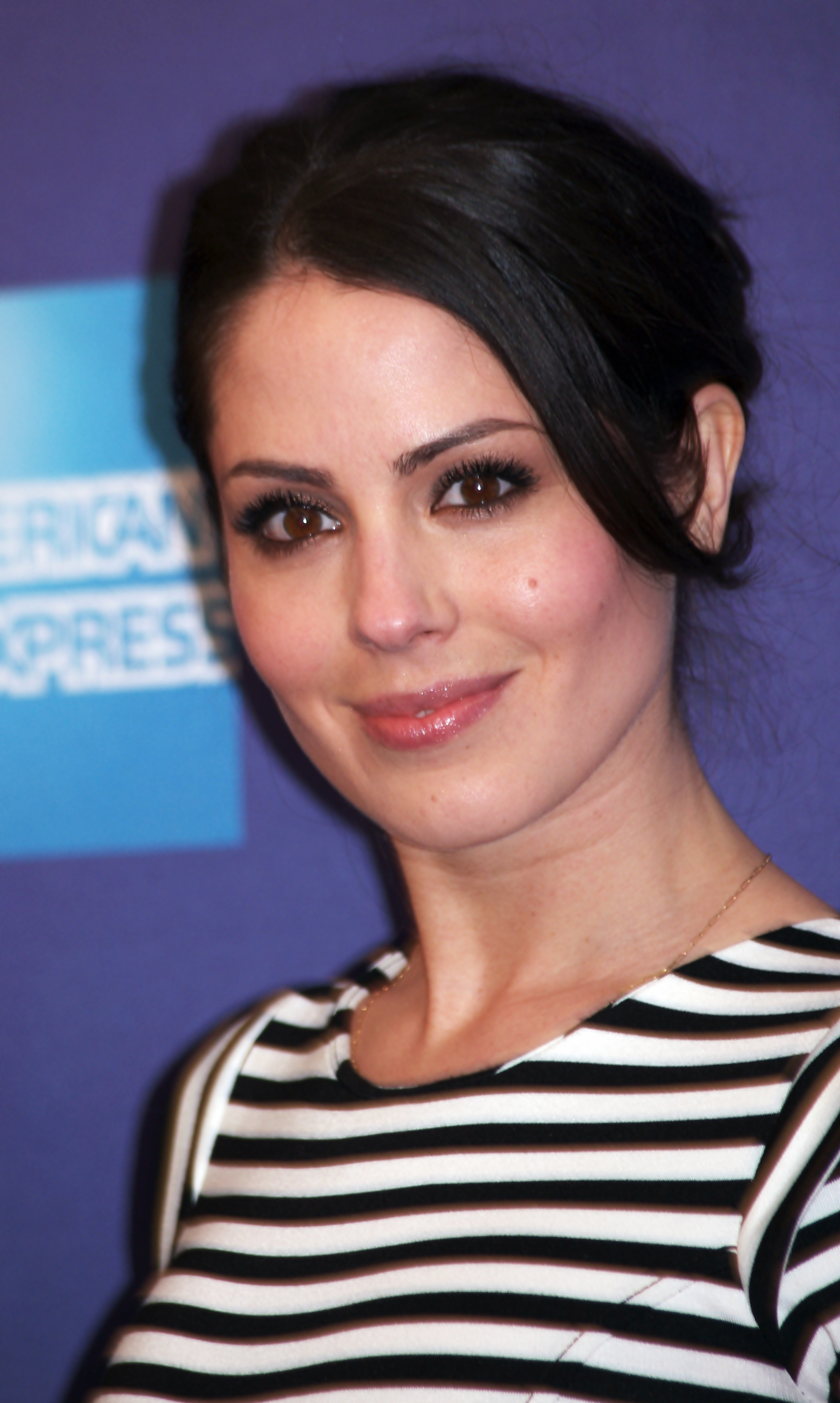
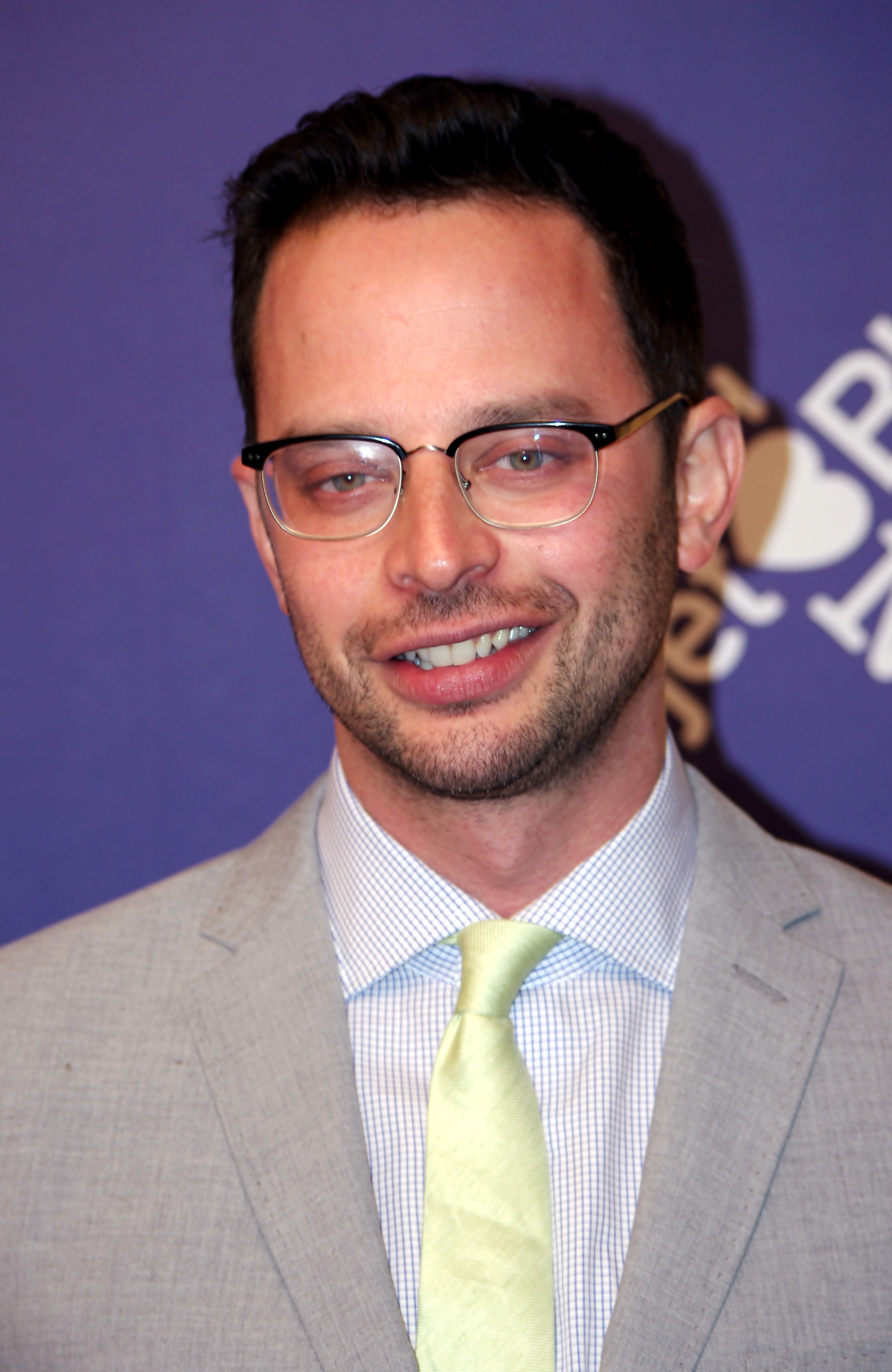
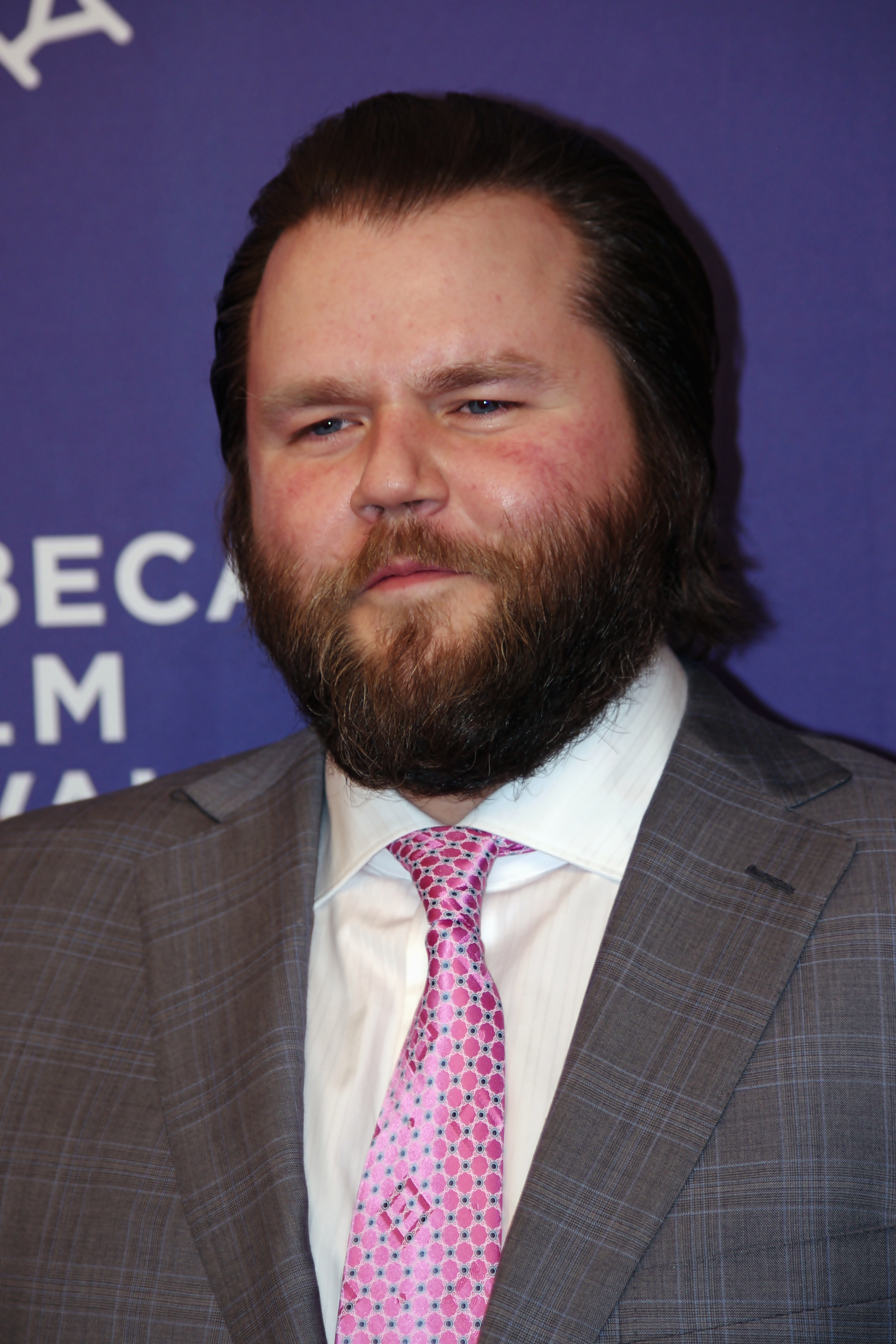
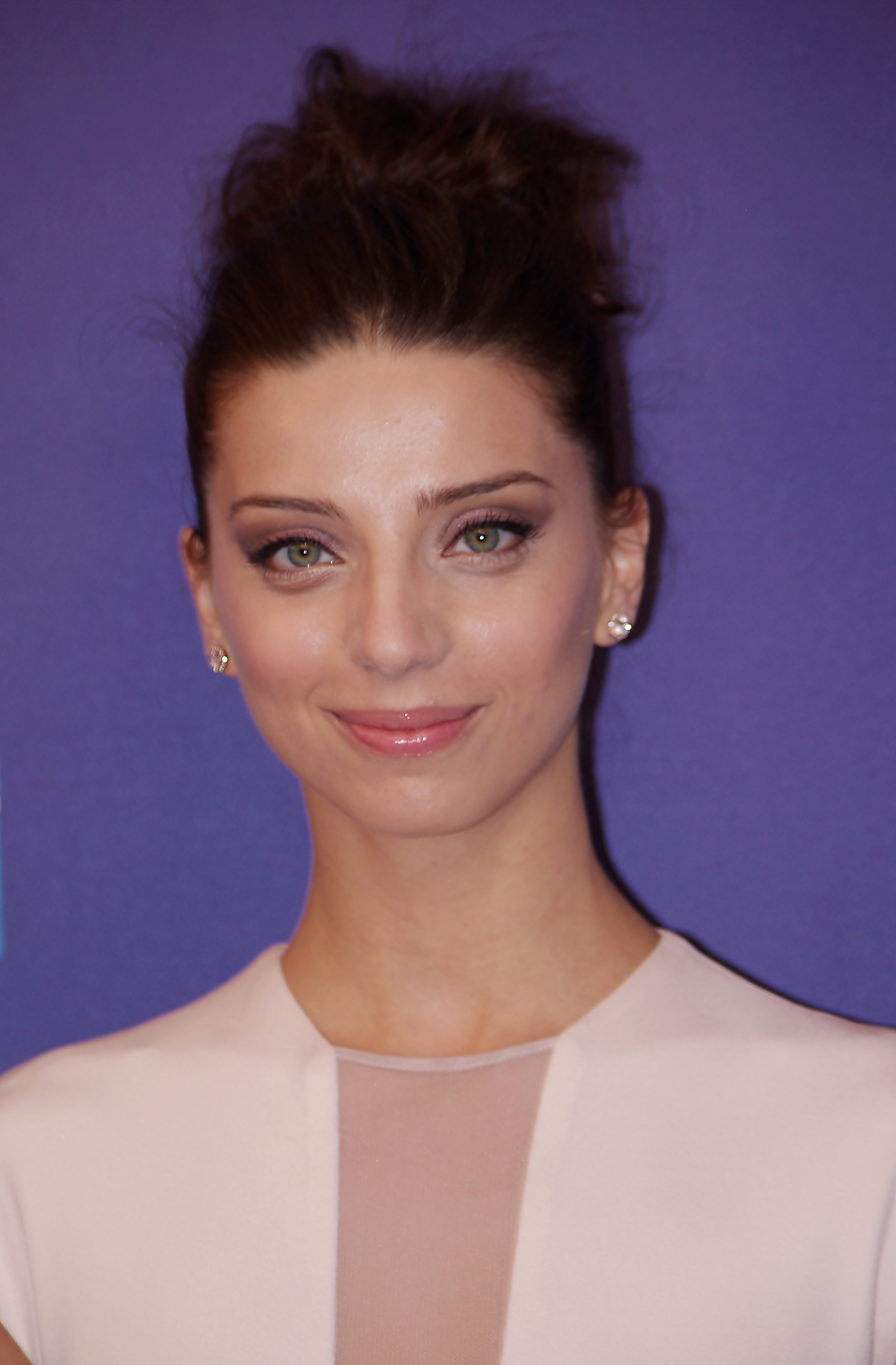
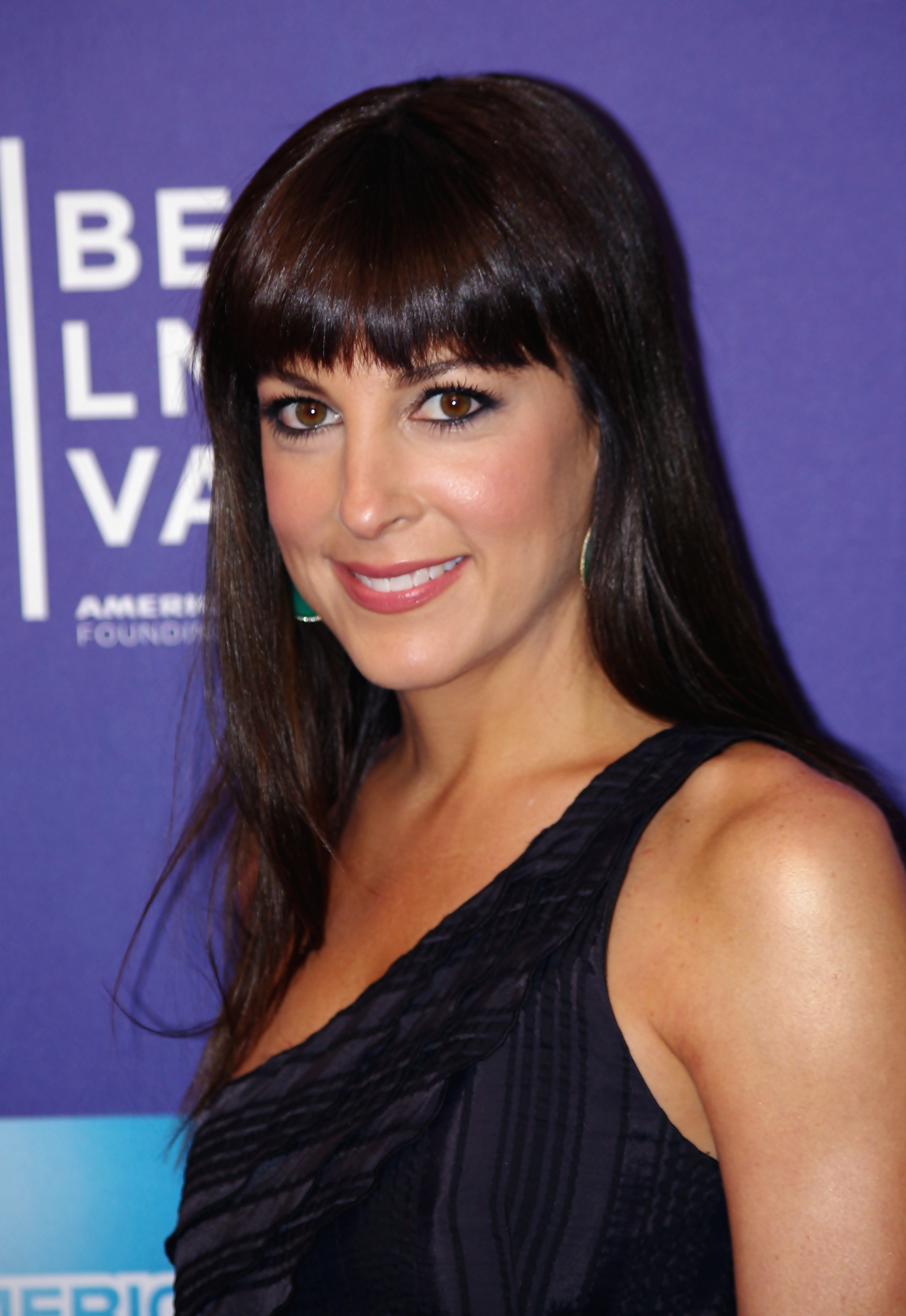
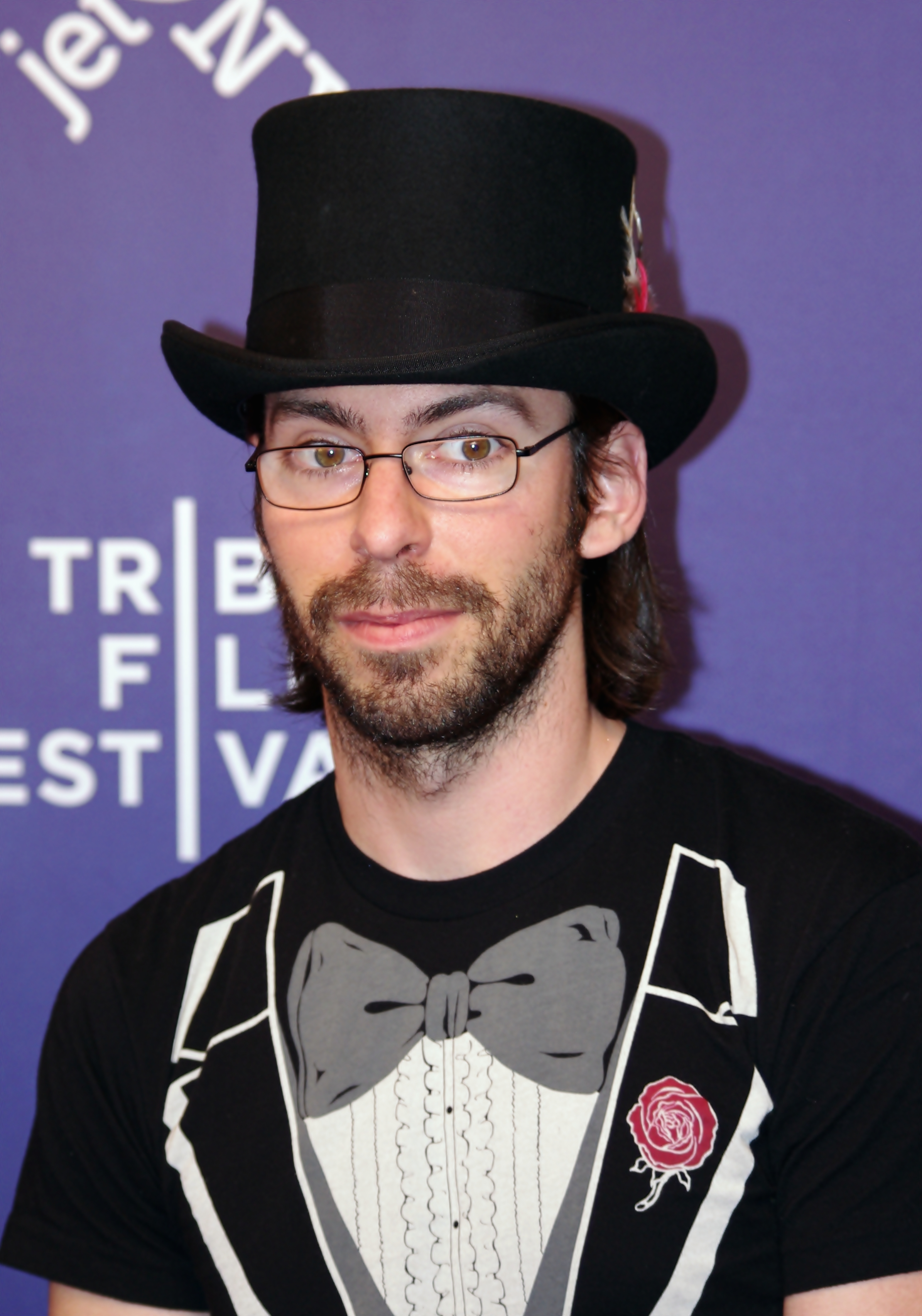
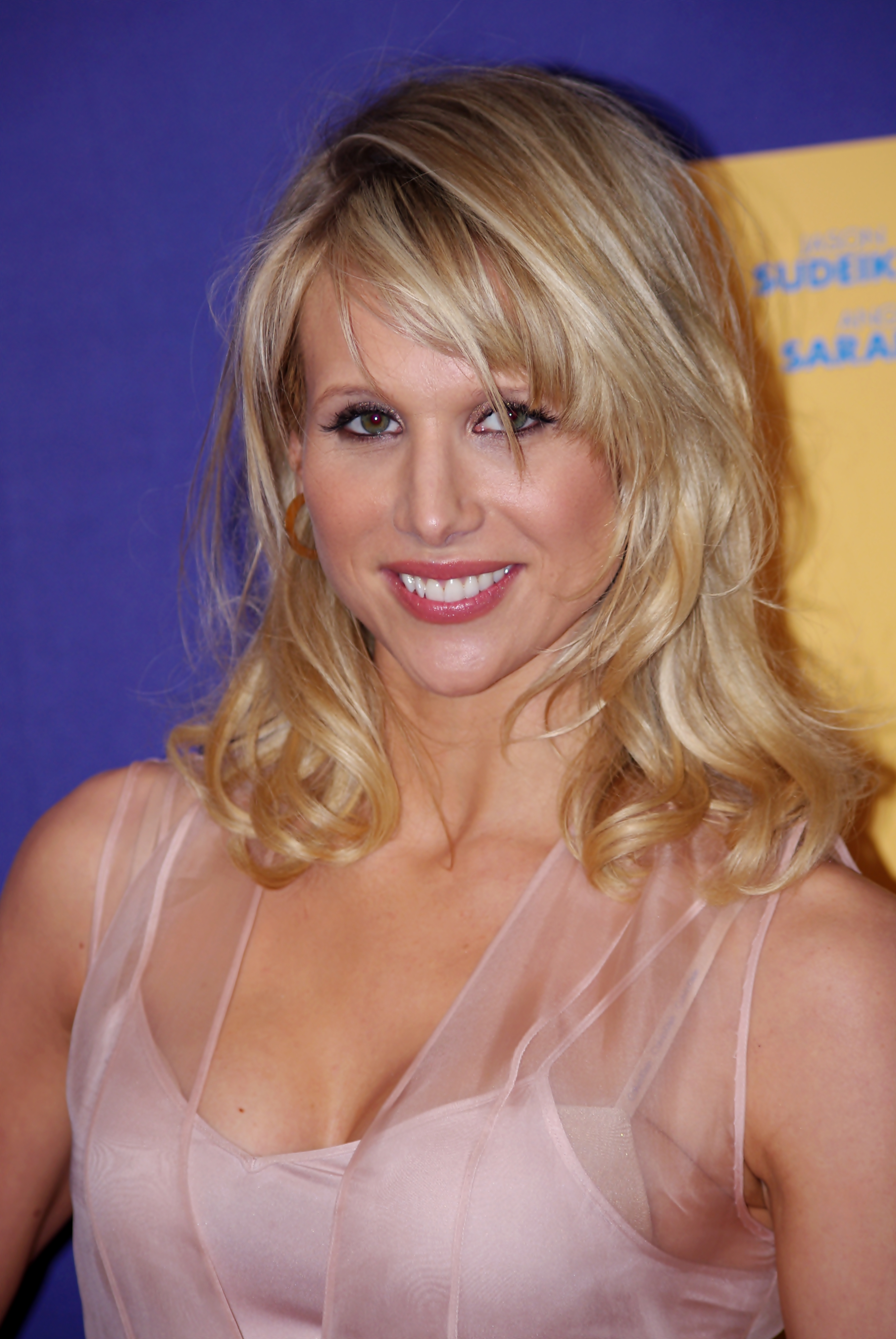
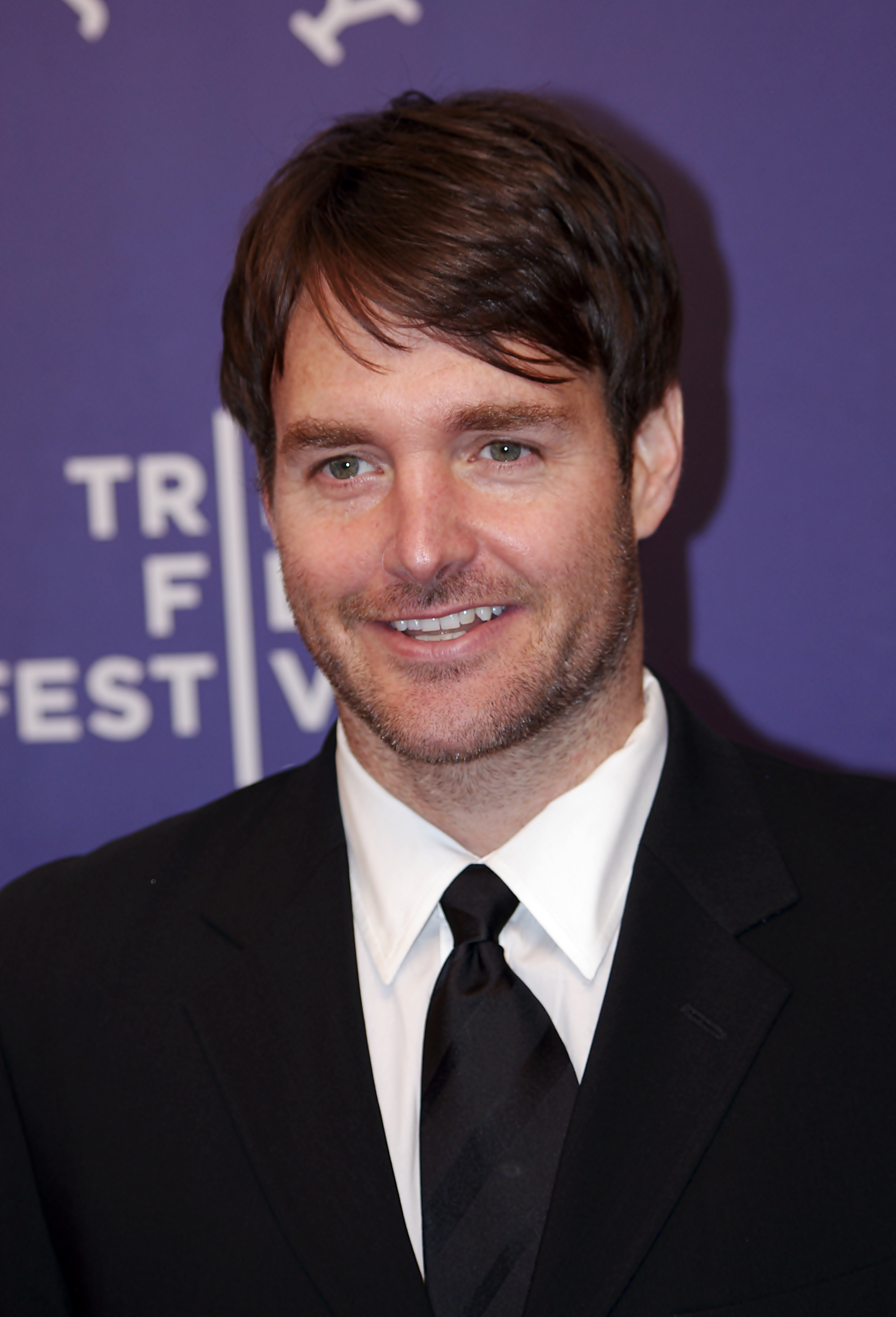
The film's eleven leads shown at the 2011 Tribeca film festival for the film, namely Jason Sudeikis (Eric), Leslie Bibb (Kelly), Lake Bell (Alison), Michelle Borth (Sue), Nick Kroll (Adam), Tyler Labine (Mike), Angela Sarafyan (Willow), Lindsay Sloane (Laura), Martin Starr (Doug), Lucy Punch (Kate) and Will Forte (Glenn) respectively

The cast includes:

- Jason Sudeikis as Eric Keppler, Jerry's son. Sudeikis was confirmed to star in the film in May 2008.
- Leslie Bibb as Kelly, the real estate agent selling the house and object of Eric's affections. Bibb was confirmed to star in the film in May 2008.
- Lake Bell as Alison Lobel, Marcus’ former girlfriend and a psychologist who agrees to the orgy after breaking up with him, and in the orgy has sex with Mike, Sue and Eric. Bell joined the film in June 2008.
- Michelle Borth as Sue Plummer, one of the friends who has feelings for Eric. In the orgy she has sex with Eric, Alison and Adam. Borth joined the cast in May 2008.
- Nick Kroll as Adam Richman, a hypochondriac workaholic.
- Tyler Labine as Mike McCrudden, Eric's best friend and Vic's nephew.
- Angela Sarafyan as Willow Talbot, Doug's girlfriend.
- Lindsay Sloane as Laura LaCarubba, a school teacher and Eric's shy friend. Joins the orgy to confront her body image issues. Sloane was initially reluctant to take the role, stating "I got the script and saw the title and immediately put it down".
- Martin Starr as Doug Duquez, Willow's boyfriend and a law student and wannabe musician.
- Will Forte as Glenn, Kate's husband who wants to take part in the orgy. Forte was confirmed to star in the film in May 2008.
- Lin Shaye as Dody Henderson, Kelly's real estate coworker and underground sex-club member.
- Rhys Coiro as Marcus, Alison's German boyfriend, who prefers European football over baseball, and breaks up with Alison because of her shaven vagina, and does not participate in the orgy.
- David Koechner as Vic George, Mike's uncle from whom Mike gets orgy advice at an underground sex-club.
- Lucy Punch as Kate, Glenn's wife who wants to take part in the orgy.
- Don Johnson as Jerry Keppler, Eric's father.

Gregory and Huyck cameo in the film as a pizza delivery man and a date of the character Kelly, respectively.

== Development ==
=== Writing ===
A Good Old Fashioned Orgy was long in development, with Gregory and Huyck beginning writing the script as early as 1997 while they were writers on the television series, The Larry Sanders Show. The concept of the film was based upon a story told by a fellow writer concerning a party he had attended in the Hollywood Hills that ended in an impromptu orgy. Skeptical about the amount of truth to the story, believing that people would be "too full of shame, fear and guilt to make a successful orgy happen," it nevertheless inspired Gregory and Huyck. The pair believed that the concept would make for an interesting ensemble comedy due in part to the powerful emotions that such a sexually charged situation would entail. The characters were all based upon Gregory, Huyck and their own friends. Gregory claimed that Eric (Sudeikis) and Mike (Labine) are based largely on Huyck with both Sudeikis' and Labine's wardrobe being based on him. Huyck claimed that Adam, Glenn and Marcus were based on Gregory.

Gregory and Huyck brought their first draft to their current TV agent who advised them to progress no further with the idea and abandon the project. Undaunted, the pair circulated the early draft and met with several producers to assemble a production team. With producers in place, the pair then began thinking about casting, initially setting their sights on Vince Vaughn. Vaughn ultimately did not take part in the film but worked with Gregory and Huyck on reworking the script. On Vaughn's input, Gregory stated:

Vince Vaughn gave us the single best piece of advice about the movie. We [Gregory and Huyck] were trying to make a generational movie, and he suggested that in order to make something universally resonant, you need to make it specific and personal. It's counterintuitive, but he was right. We're both really pretty square, which is why we think this is such an uncomfortably funny area. If we were orgy guys, this would have been a hyper-realistic drama.

=== Casting ===
With the new plot direction, the pair revisited the casting of the lead role, Eric. Huyck eventually saw Sudeikis singing karaoke at a Saturday Night Live after party and felt he would fit the role. At the time, Sudeikis was only a writer for Saturday Night Live and it was felt that his playing the film's lead would require a leap of faith. After Gregory saw Sudeikis acting on the comedy show 30 Rock however, he was also convinced that Sudeikis would be perfect for the role. While interviewing casting directors, Susie Farris stated her first choice for the role would also be Sudeikis, resulting in her being hired.

=== Filming ===
Principal photography for the film commenced in May 2008 in Wilmington, North Carolina, taking place over 30 days. Wilmington was chosen due to it possessing the largest studio infrastructure on the east coast of America and because of the native architecture that bore similarities to homes found in the Hamptons of Long Island, New York. No stages or sets were created for the production with all filming occurring on location in actual businesses and locations using local residents as extras. One business in particular, only agreed to filming after it was agreed that the business name, "Fred's Beds", appear in the racy scene involving research for the orgy at a sex club. A late night party scene involved local extras and was filmed over 10 hours. During filming, the producers commissioned The Wallnuts Crew to spray paint graffiti on the wall of a local business for the punk rocker polaroid photo shoot scene. As the graffiti artist worked on the backdrop the police stormed the set completely unaware there was a permit issued.

== Release ==
In February 2011, Samuel Goldwyn Films and Sony Pictures Worldwide Acquisitions (SPWA) obtained the distributions rights to the film in the United States. Samuel Goldwyn theatrically released the film, aiming for a late Summer 2011 release. SPWA also obtained the Australian and Canadian rights to release the film. The film premiered at the 2011 Tribeca Film Festival in New York City on April 29, 2011. The US West coast premiere occurred at the ArcLight Hollywood cinema in Hollywood, California on August 25, 2011.

== Reception ==
=== Box office ===
A Good Old Fashioned Orgy received a limited release in the United States on September 2, 2011 across 143 theaters. During its opening weekend, the film grossed $154,604 over the 4-day Labor Day weekend. The film ultimately earned $200,227 in the United States and $1,178,720 elsewhere for a total of $1,378,947 worldwide.

=== Critical reception ===
A Good Old Fashioned Orgy received mixed reviews from critics. As of October 2021, the film holds a 35% approval rating on Rotten Tomatoes, based on 65 reviews with an average rating of 4.6/10. The site's critical consensus reads, "Its titillating title promises ribald laughs, but the lazily written, indifferently acted, and only sporadically funny A Good Old Fashioned Orgy fails to consummate." On Metacritic, the film has a score of 44 out of 100, based on 26 critics, indicating "mixed or average" reviews.

John Defore of The Hollywood Reporter compared the film favorably to "'80s summer romp-romances", describing it as a "solidly commercial picture". DeFore appreciated the "witty banter" delivered by the cast but singled out Labine as "inherently funny" and the "cast's only automatic laugh-getter". DeFore however lamented that the film was "less outrageous than expected" given the premise and "may leave audiences wanting more". DeFore was critical of the film for including women who "look like models" in the orgy "while only one of the men can be called handsome." John Anderson of Variety reacted positively to the film, stating "the comic timing of this sex-saturated farce...adds up to a winner in the laughs department", echoing DeFore's sentiments that the dialog is "smart".

Katie Calautti of Comic Book Resources appreciated the "whip-smart humor" and "palpable chemistry" between the cast. Calautti concluded her review by saying "The happy ending, though, is that their spot-on casting and solid narrative deliver bang for your buck." The Village Voice enjoyed the film, stating "riffs and one-liners fly from every corner, fast enough to avert the sting of the lamer gambits" and concluded that it "may be the sex comedy this generation deserves."
