= A Talking Cat!?! =

2013 film by David DeCoteau

- Promotional release poster
- Directed by: David DeCoteau
- Written by: Andrew Helm
- Produced by: Marco Colombo; David DeCoteau
- Starring: Johnny Whitaker; Kristine DeBell; Eric Roberts
- Cinematography: David DeCoteau
- Edited by: Danny Draven
- Music by: Harry Manfredini
- Production company: Rapid Heart Pictures
- Distributed by: Phase 4 Films
- Release date: February 18, 2013
- Running time: 83 minutes
- Country: United States
- Language: English

A Talking Cat!?! is a 2013 American independent family comedy film directed by David DeCoteau and starring Eric Roberts as the voice of Duffy, the titular talking cat. The film was released direct-to-video on February 18, 2013 by Phase 4 Films. Critical reception was predominantly negative.

== Synopsis ==
Duffy the cat is a cat that is capable of talking to humans, but only once per individual. While out walking, he comes across two families, both led by single parents. The wealthy Phil Barber recently sold his computer company in order to spend more time with his son Chris, who is largely indifferent about his dad's decision. He is more concerned about his crush on schoolmate Frannie, who has hired him as a tutor. Meanwhile, Susan is struggling to make ends meet as a caterer with her two children Tina and Trent.

Duffy speaks to each person giving advice on their lives and worries. He manages to help Chris get together with Frannie, give Trent the confidence and guidance for his future, and directs Tina to read about the sale of Phil's company. This guides Tina to approach Phil about a computer program she created. Duffy also advises Phil to begin taking walks outside, knowing that this will likely lead to a romance between him and Susan.

Despite these successes, Duffy forgets to talk to Susan. This results in her growing angry when she discovers that both of her children have neglected her instructions to stay at home and help her with baking cheese puffs and are instead at Phil's house baking cheese puffs. This causes a rift between Phil and Susan that is only mended after Duffy is hit by a speeding car and they must pair together with their children to find his magic collar. They find the collar and quickly bring it back to Duffy, saving his life in the process.

== Cast ==
- Johnny Whitaker as Phil Barber
- Kristine DeBell as Susan
- Justin Cone as Chris Barber
- Janis Peebles as Tina
- Alison Sieke as Frannie
- Daniel Dannas as Trent
- Eric Roberts as Duffy (voice)
- Squeaky as Duffy

== Production ==
The film is one of several direct-to-video family films directed by David DeCoteau under the pseudonym Mary Crawford. It was shot in three days in the same mansion as director DeCoteau's 1313 series.

Sources conflict on exactly how Eric Roberts's dialogue as Duffy was recorded; in a 2017 episode of the podcast Eric Roberts Is The F*****g Man, Roberts said that he recorded his dialogue in the bathroom of "some guy's house" as the bathroom had the best acoustics, while in a 2020 interview with The B-Movie Podcast, DeCoteau claimed that Roberts recorded the dialogue in his own living room in just fifteen minutes. DeCoteau also claimed that Roberts recorded his lines in 15 minutes over a phone call.

== Reception ==
Critical reception was predominantly negative, with Film.com criticizing the character of Duffy and the laziness of the special effects. The A.V. Club gave a mostly negative review for the film, but stated that "for lovers of utter, unredeemable trash, it is highly recommended." CraveOnline also gave a negative review, but also recommended it as a film for "Bad Movie Night".

In his book So Bad, It's Good II: Electric Bookaloo, Edward Scimia writes of Roberts' performance that "It's safe to call his delivery of the cat's lines disinterested. [...] There's also the puzzling audio quality of his material: it clearly stands out from the rest of the film, with many remarking that it sounds as though he recorded his lines in a bathroom." He sums up the movie with "In the end, Duffy uses his demonic powers for good, helping to [...] teach several cast members valuable lessons about...whatever. You don't really care. It's a terrible movie about a talking cat."

In an interview, DeCoteau said of the film that "people have called me who I haven't seen since high school who said, 'David, after 100 movies you've finally made a movie we like.'" He added, "I watched it again, because I hadn't seen it since we made it, and it is so ridiculous and hilarious and over-the-top." It was also spoofed by RiffTrax on June 26, 2018.

== See also ==
- Cats & Dogs
- Air Buddies
- Beverly Hills Chihuahua
- Nine Lives - 2016 family film similar in content
- List of films considered the worst
