= The Suckling =

1990 American horror film

- Promotional release poster
- Directed by: Francis Teri
- Written by: Francis Teri
- Produced by: Michael Helman
- Starring: Lisa Petruno; Tim Martin Crouse; Michael Gingold; Frank Rivera; Janet Sovery; Gerald Preger; Susan Brodsky; Antoinette Greene; Brian Muirhill
- Cinematography: Harry Eisenstein
- Music by: Joseph Teri
- Distributed by: Hypercube
- Release date: September 24, 1990 (Worldwide)
- Running time: 89 minutes
- Country: United States
- Language: English

The Suckling (also known as Sewage Baby) is a 1990 American horror film directed by Francis Teri and starring Frank Rivera (under the pseudonym Frank Reeves), Marie Michaels, and Michael Gingold.

== Plot ==
On April 1, 1973 in Brooklyn, a college student named Bill takes his pregnant girlfriend Rebecca to get an abortion at a seedy back-alley abortion clinic which also doubles as a brothel. Rebecca is reluctant to go through with the process, but before she can back out of it, she is rendered unconscious after drinking a drugged liquid given to her by Big Mama, the woman running the establishment. After removing the fetus, Big Mama gets her assistant Bertha to dispose of it by flushing it down the toilet. The fetus winds up in the sewer and comes into contact with toxic waste being leaked from a nearby barrel, which gradually mutates it into a large, humanoid monster.

After Rebecca regains consciousness, Bertha starts hearing noises coming from the toilet. When she goes to investigate, the fetus's tentacle bursts out and rips her head off. Candy, a prostitute, witnesses the murder, and hysterically runs off to inform the rest of the staff. They then discover that all the doors and windows have been blocked up with a strange, fleshy substance, and the phone lines are dead.

After the survivors witness the monster killing another hooker in the building, they try to formulate a plan to escape. Sherman, the man in charge of the bordello, is later attacked by the monster, and Axel, Big Mama's son and a former prisoner with anger issues, inadvertedly shoots Sherman to death while trying to kill the creature. Axel then elects himself as the leader and shoots Candy in the head when she tries to talk back, before telling the remaining survivors that he wants them to kill the monster before they try and escape.

On Bill's suggestion, he, Axel and a few other survivors head into the basement, believing the creature may be hiding in the boiler room. Their theory proves correct, but when Axel tries to kill the creature, he accidentally stabs a fuse box, which electrocutes him until his head explodes. Later, Bill and Rebecca manage to break a hole in the front door by tying a rope to a heavy suitcase and using it as a battering ram. When a survivor tries using it to escape, however, he finds himself in a strange, fleshy environment where the monster attacks and kills him.

Eventually, Bill, Rebecca and Big Mama are left as the only remaining survivors. Big Mama goes into the basement to see her son's corpse, and the creature appears and kills her before bursting into the lobby and killing Bill. With Rebecca as the only one still alive, the monster reverts to the size of a regular fetus before forcing its way inside of her through her vagina. When the police are brought to investigate the building, they find Rebecca alive, but in a coma. About a week later, Rebecca, still catatonic, has been taken to a psych ward in a hospital. The doctors and police officers are skeptical of her claims, but when a hospital attendant tries to rape her, the creature bursts out of Rebecca and kills him.

== Cast ==
- Lisa Petruno as Rebecca
- Tim Martin Crouse as Bill
- Frank Rivera as Axel
- Janet Sovey as Big Mama
- Marie Michaels as Candy
- Gerald Preger as Sherman
- Susan Brodsky as Sheryl
- Antoinette Greene as Bertha
- Brian Muirhill as Customer
- Jeff Burchfield as Police Officer
- Bobby Shapiro as Doctor #1
- Allen Lieb as Doctor #2
- Alley Ninestein as Nurse
- Michael Gingold as The Suckling

== Reception ==
John Squires of Bloody Disgusting referred to the film as an example of a "best worst movie", and wrote that it is "home to all the terrible acting and weird storytelling choices that make bad movies so much fun to watch. This movie has it all, and it’s highlighted by surprisingly good creature effects that outshine absolutely everything else on display in it." Matt Hudson of HorrorNews.net gave the film a negative review, criticizing the film's low budget, acting, and script.

== Home media ==
The Suckling was released for on DVD by Elite on May 10, 2005. It was later released by Films Around World on August 28, 2018. The film was first released on Blu-ray on March 26, 2019, by Vinegar Syndrome.
