= Scene 23 =

US musical group

- Genres: Pop; Teen pop R&B
- Years active: 2001–2002
- Labels: London-Sire; Atlantic; Wea
- Past members: Laurie Gidosh; Monika Christian; Dorothy Szamborska; Donavan Green; Josh Henderson

Scene 23 was an American pop group formed by the winners of the reality television series Popstars 2, which aired on The WB Television Network in the fall of 2001.

The original lineup of Scene 23 consisted of six members, three males and three females: Josh Henderson (background vocals), Donavan Green (lead vocals), Moises Juarez (background vocals), Monika Christian (lead and background vocals), Laurie Gidosh (lead and background vocals), who would later go by Lauriana Mae, and Dorothy Szamborska (background vocals). During the run of the show, producers David Stanley and Scott Stone kicked Moises Juarez out of the group.

Scene 23 only recorded seven tracks for the series soundtrack album, Popstars 2: Introducing Scene 23. The album was heavily padded with covers from other artists, and included several tracks of people talking about the Popstars audition process set to music. While the track "I Really Don’t Think So" was chosen as the first single and the group filmed a music video for the song, it was only released commercially as a single by the Dutch band K-otic. Their version appeared on their debut album Bulletproof as part of the Dutch show Starmaker. In 2023, Josh Henderson appeared on the podcast Frosted Tips with Lance Bass and confirmed that Scene 23's disbanding was the result of London-Sire's dissolution, which was also the cause of Popstars' season 1 band, Eden's Crush, breaking up. Had the group continued further, they would've been managed by Johnny Wright and brought on as an opening act for *NSYNC's final tour.

== Discography ==
- 2001: Music From The Show Popstars 2: Introducing Scene 23
  1. "Interlude: I Wanna Be A Popstar" - 0:36
  2. "He Said She Said" - 3:16
  3. "The Greatest" - 3:45
  4. "I Really Don't Think So" - 3:27
  5. "All This Love" - 4:02
  6. "What She Got" - 2:45
  7. "Another Night" - 3:36
  8. "Respect Me" - 3:29
  9. "Interlude: Nervewracking" - 0:33
  10. "I Believe I Can Fly" (R. Kelly) - 5:20
  11. "Interlude: Judged" - 0:33
  12. "I Still Believe" (Mariah Carey) - 3:51
  13. "I Wanna Know" (Joe) - 4:57
  14. "Interlude: Welcome To Boot Camp" - 0:34
