= Beastly Boyz =

- Written by: David Grove
- Directed by: David Decoteau
- Starring: Sebastian Gacki; Emery Wright; Kyle Schwitek; Dean Hrycan; Valerie Murphy; Tyler Burrows; Neil William Hrabowy; Andrew Butler; Charlie Marsh
- Original language: English

Production
- Producers: David Decoteau (producer)
- Running time: 96 minutes

Original release
- Network: Here!
- Release: 2006

Beastly Boyz is a 2006 Canadian-American homoerotic horror television film directed by David DeCoteau. It was the first film to be released on his Rapid Heart Extreme label. The film has been screened on the LGBT-focused here! television network.

== Plot ==
Rachel, a beautiful young artist, is murdered at her secluded lakefront house by a group of soulless killers. Her brother Travis vows to punish her killers one by one - even if it costs him his soul. Guided by his sister's ghostly voice that commands him to take brutal revenge, Travis hunts down each of the killers and punishes them in gruesome fashion. Travis's conscience catches up with him, but his sister's voice and other circumstances push him into much more horrible circumstances than he is already in.
