= Haley Webb =

American actress (born 1985)

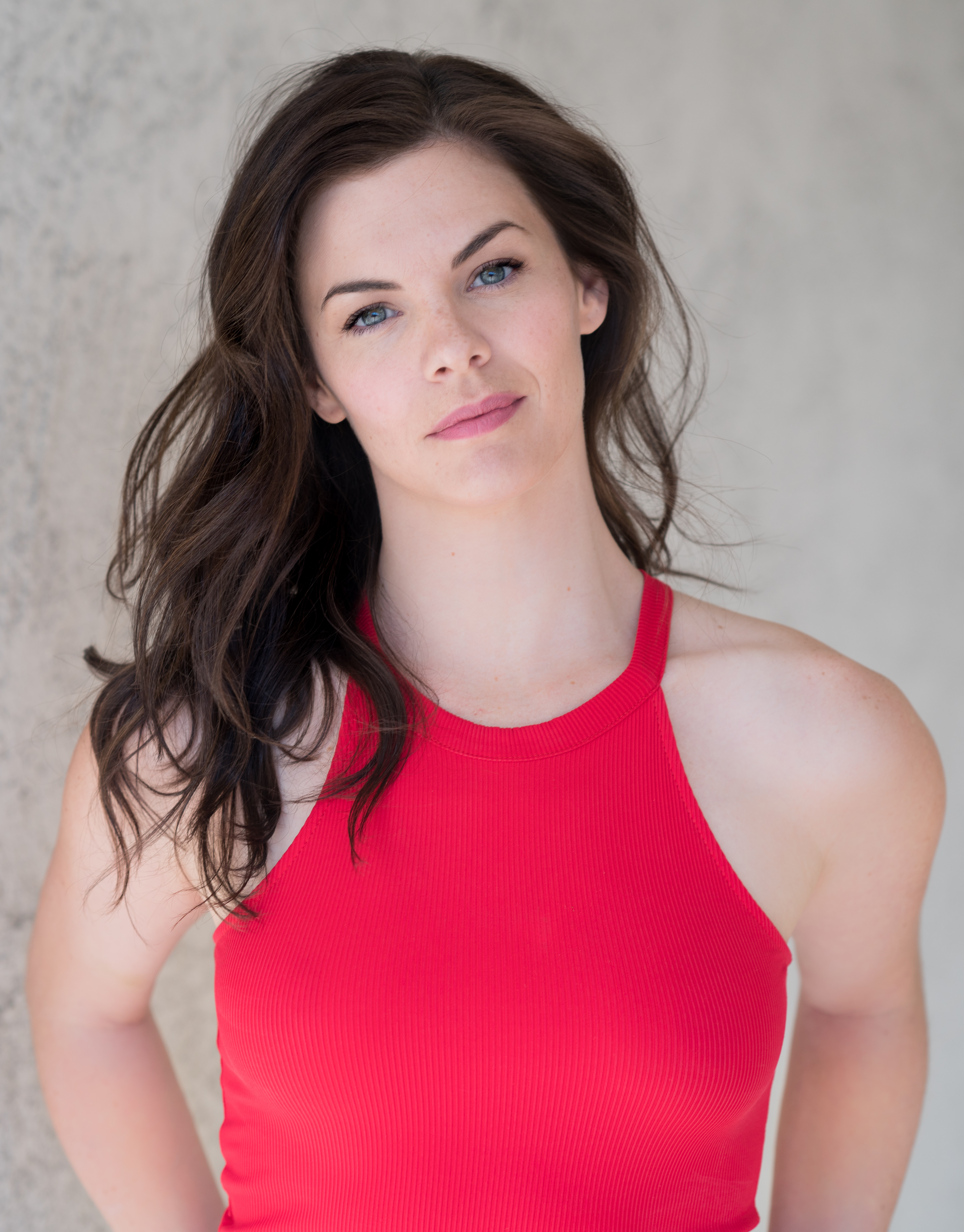
- Born: Haley Vianne Webb; December 25, 1985 (age 40); Woodbridge Virginia U.S.
- Occupation: Actress・filmmaker
- Years active: 2006–present
- Website: www.haleywebb.com

Haley Webb (born December 25, 1985) is an American actress and filmmaker. She is the founder and president of the film production company Legion of Horribles.

As an actor, Webb is best known for her work in the MTV series Teen Wolf as Jennifer Blake and in Warner Bros.' The Final Destination (2009) as Janet Cunningham. Webb's notable films include Netflix's Blonde, Sugar Mountain (2016), Rushlights (2013) and BET's Alieu the Dreamer.

== Life and career ==
Haley Webb studied at Joanne Baron / D.W. Brown Acting Studio.

Webb made her directorial debut with the 2012 short film Patti, about the life and work of artist Patti Smith, in which she played the eponymous role. She also served as producer, film editor, set decorator, sound editor, and costumer.

In early 2018, Webb began working as a private acting teacher. In late 2018, Webb wrote, directed, produced, edited and acted in the short film Joyeux Noël.

== Pledge ==
In September 2025, she signed an open pledge with Film Workers for Palestine pledging not to work with Israeli film institutions "that are implicated in genocide and apartheid against the Palestinian people."

== Filmography ==
=== Film ===
| Year | Title | Role | Notes |
|---|---|---|---|
| 2008 | Big Game | Toni | |
| 2009 | The Final Destination | Janet Cunningham | |
| 2011 | On the Inside | Allen's Girlfriend | |
| 2012 | Patti | Patti Smith | Short film; also director, producer, film editor, set decorator, sound editor, and costumer |
| 2012 | A Conversation About Cheating with My Time Travelling Future Self | Jenny | Short film |
| 2013 | Wonderstruck | Amy | Short film |
| 2013 | Rushlights | Sarah | |
| 2014 | Lost in Gray | Dana | Short film |
| 2014 | Magpie | Maggie | |
| 2015 | Single in South Beach | Amy | |
| 2016 | Byoutiful | Becca Ayres | Short film; also producer, co-director, film editor and writer |
| 2016 | Sugar Mountain | Lauren Huxley | |
| 2018 | Joyeux Noël | Haley | Short film; also producer, director, film editor, writer, key costumer and makeup artist |
| 2018 | The Gift | Daughter | Short film |
| 2020 | Errol Flynn | Cupcake | Short film |
| 2020 | Alieu the Dreamer | Maya | |
| 2022 | Sleepwalker | Jenny | Short film |
| 2022 | Blonde | Brooke | |
| 2022 | Bandit | Carla | |
| 2023 | Teen Wolf: The Movie | Jennifer Blake | |
| 2023 | The Black Disquisition | Abby | Short film |

=== Television ===
| Year | Show | Role | Notes |
|---|---|---|---|
| 2006 | Close to Home | Kayla Philby | Episode: "Hot Grrrl" |
| 2008 | Shark | Danielle | Episode: "Fall from Grace" |
| 2012 | Sketchy | Actress | Episode: "Chutes and Ladders" |
| 2012 | Major Crimes | Dana Baker | Episode: "Before and After" |
| 2013–2017 | Teen Wolf | Jennifer Blake | 11 episodes |
| 2014 | Beauty and the Beast | Laura Scott | Episode: "Don't Die on Me" |
| 2014 | The Librarians | Mabel Collins | Episode: "City of Light" |
| 2015 | Backstrom | Virginia Anderson | Episode: "I Like to Watch" |
| 2015 | Letter Never Sent | Claire Goodster | Television film |
| 2016 | Powers | Young Janis Sandusky | Episode: "Origins" |
| 2017 | It Happened One Valentine's | Allie Rusch | Television film |
| 2017 | Unwritten Obsession | Skye Chaste | Television film |
| 2018 | No Good Deed | Aya | Television film |
| 2019 | Fear Bay | Linda Marshall | Television film |
| 2019 | Hawaii Five-0 | Lisa Kamaka | Episode: "Ke iho mai nei ko luna" |
| 2020 | Chicago P.D. | Michelle Sullivan | Episode: "Intimate Violence" |
| 2022 | S.W.A.T. | Amanda Ross | Episode: Old School Cool |

=== Other ===
| Year | Title | Role | Notes |
|---|---|---|---|
| 2010 | Ry Cuming – "Always Remember Me" | Ry's girlfriend | Music video |
| 2014 | Cameron the Pub – "Apple Pie" | Girl | Music video |
| 2014 | Ancient Societies | Stella Vyctory | Alternate reality game |
