= The Sisterhood (2004 film) =

- DVD cover
- Directed by: David DeCoteau
- Written by: Jana K. Arnold
- Produced by: Paul Colichman; Stephen P. Jarchow
- Starring: Barbara Crampton; Jennifer Holland; Michelle Borth; Storm David Newton; Kate Plec; Sara Michelle Ben Av
- Cinematography: Paul Suderman
- Edited by: Danny Draven
- Music by: Joe Silva
- Production company: Regent Entertainment
- Distributed by: Image Entertainment
- Release date: June 6, 2004 (United States)
- Running time: 85 minutes
- Country: United States
- Language: English

The Sisterhood is a 2004 American supernatural horror film directed by David DeCoteau.

== Plot ==
Two girls, Christine and Reagan, find themselves paired as college roommates. Christine, a diligent student, mourns the recent loss of her parents in an automobile accident. Reagan wants to enjoy all that college has to offer. For her, college equals sex, drugs and rock and roll.

Reagan convinces Christine to come to a Beta Alpha Tau sorority party and they both find it fun and provocative. When Christine's professor finds out that she might get accepted into the popular sorority, she urges Christine to join. The professor thinks that the sorority is a sinister force, taking souls and ruining the lives of students. If Christine can infiltrate their ranks, she might find the truth behind the sorority's power. When she gets a bid from the beautiful and powerful president of the sorority, Devin, she accepts and is introduced to a sensuous and intoxicating lifestyle.

Christine finds herself with newfound powers and delves into new pleasures. When the final initiation ceremony arrives, the stage is set for her entry into the world of darkness. The outcome is far from clear.

== Cast ==
- Barbara Crampton as Ms. Masters
- Jennifer Holland as Christine
- Michelle Borth as Devin Sinclair
- Storm David Newton as Josh
- Kate Plec as Reagan
- Sara Michelle Ben Av as Sarah
- Jonna Giovanna as Samantha
- Scot Nicol as Ken
- Justin Wilczynski as Bart
- Brenda Schmid as Amy (credited as Brenda Blade)
- Amy Whitaker as Clara
- Greyston Holt as Dan (credited as Greyston Stefancsik)
- Houston Rhines as Eric
- Matt Fitzgerald as Damon
