= Ancient Evil: Scream of the Mummy =

- Directed by: David DeCoteau
- Written by: Matthew Jason Walsh
- Produced by: David DeCoteau; Sam Irvin; David Silberg
- Starring: Jeff Peterson; Trent Latta; Ariauna Albright; Russell Richardson; Michele Nordin; Brenda Blondell; Michael Lutz; Christopher Cullen; Anton Falk
- Production company: Azteca Catrinca S.A.
- Distributed by: Amsell Entertainment
- Release date: July 22, 2000
- Running time: 86 minutes
- Countries: United States; Mexico
- Language: English

Ancient Evil: Scream of the Mummy is a 2000 American-Mexican horror film directed by David DeCoteau. Released as Bram Stoker's Legend of the Mummy 2 in the United Kingdom, it was followed by a sequel, Ancient Evil 2: Guardian of the Underworld, released in 2005. In England, the film was the subject of a consumer complaint regarding its BBFC classification.

== Plot ==
A slew of artifacts found in an ancient Aztec pyramid dedicated to the rain god Tlaloc have been delivered to a university in the United States for study and display. Among these artifacts is a remarkably well-preserved mummy. Several archeology students and their professor have been tasked with preparing them for display and study. While preparing the artifacts one of them steals an amulet from the mummy and presents it as a gift to his paramour, unaware that fellow student Norman has witnessed the entire exchange.

Unbeknownst to the rest of the group, Norman is descended from Aztec priests and had been planning on taking the amulet himself, so he could complete a ritual to Tlaloc. He resurrects the mummy in order to retrieve the amulet and begins killing all of the others. During the chaos the remaining students discover that the planned ritual would bring about an apocalypse. Eventually only two, Stacey and Don, remain. The mummy kidnaps Stacey to serve as a virgin sacrifice. Don manages to rescue Stacey by interrupting the ritual and smashing the amulet, after which he kills Norman and the mummy. He then frees Stacey and the two wander away from the museum, apocalypse averted.

== Cast ==
- Trent Latta as Norman
- Jeff Peterson as Don
- Ariauna Albright as Stacey
- Michele Nordin as Janine (as Michelle Erickson)
- Russell Richardson as Arlando
- Michael Lutz as Morris
- Brenda Blondell as Professor Cyphers
- Christopher Cullen as Scott
- Christopher Bergschneider as The Mummy (as Anton Falk)

== Production ==
An international co-production between The United States and Mexico, produced by the American production company Kremlin Films and the Mexican production company Azteca Catrinca S.A. Filmed in Baja California, Mexico in locations with museum and college in 1999. The film was shot in Mexico in four days.

== Release ==
Ancient Evil: Scream of the Mummy was released on July 22, 2000. The film was retitled to Bram Stoker's Legend of the Mummy 2 in the United Kingdom, where it received a consumer complaint regarding its BBFC classification, which gave it a 15-rating.

== Reception ==
Bryan Senn was critical of the film, stating that "Even the killings prove about as exciting as watching mummy wrappings dry, as they offer little suspense, less action (the killing is never seen, only implied), and no blood." Felix Vasquez reviewed Ancient Evil for Cinema Crazed, writing that it was "an embarrassing and painfully tedious horror film that fails to deliver on every conceivable element of horror, suspense, drama, or terror" and including an apology from the screenwriter in his review.
