= Josh Henderson =

American actor, model and singer (born 1981)

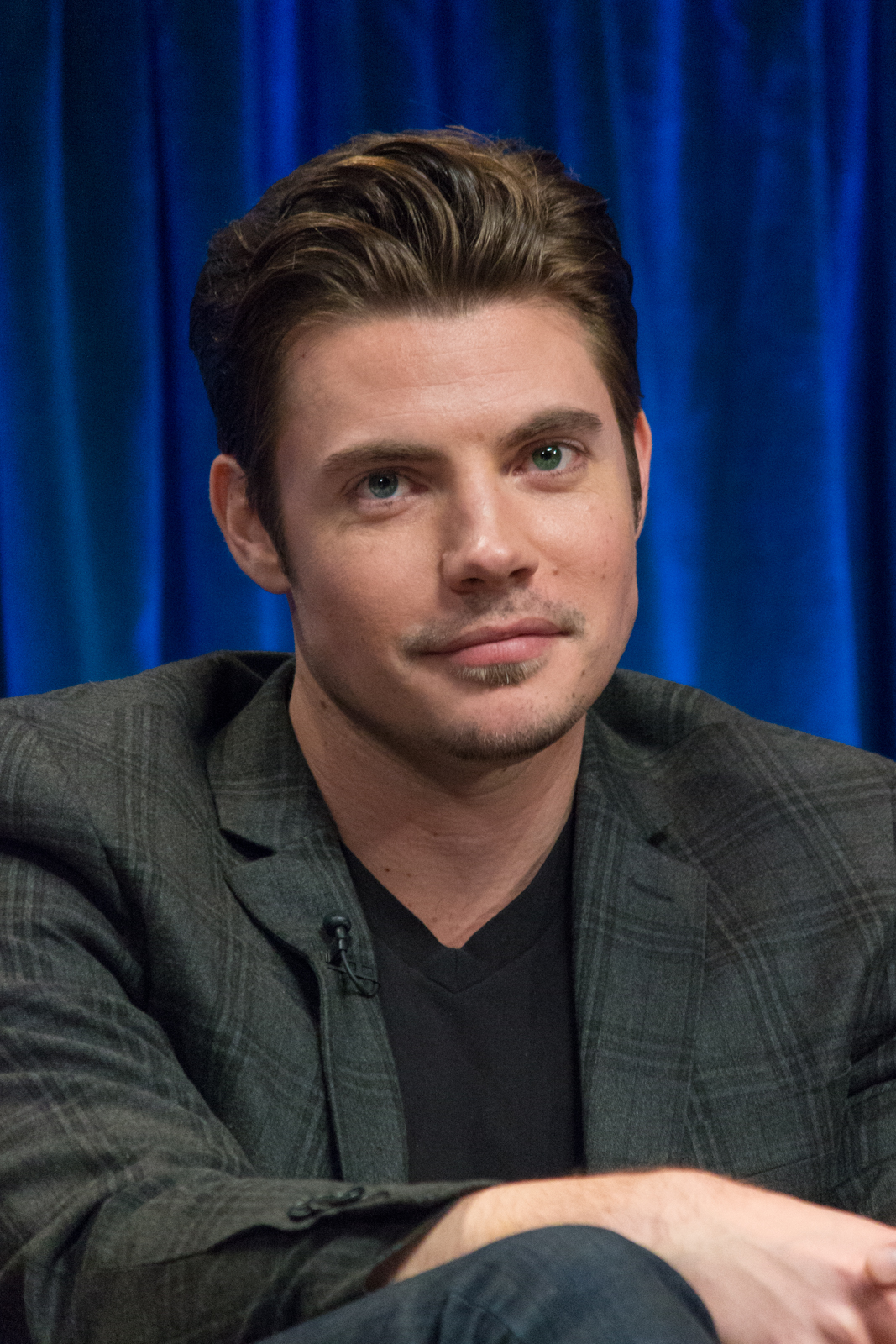
- Henderson at the PaleyFest 2013 forum for Dallas
- Born: October 25, 1981 (age 44); Dallas, Texas, U.S.
- Occupations: Actor, model, singer
- Years active: 2001–present

Joshua Baret Henderson (born October 25, 1981) is an American actor, model, and singer. Henderson is best known for his lead role as John Ross Ewing III in the TNT revival of Dallas (2012–2014). He played Austin McCann on the ABC television series Desperate Housewives (2006–2007), and appeared in films like Step Up. He became widely known after his appearance on The WB singing competition show Popstars 2, where he was one of the winners selected to be a member of the pop group Scene 23.

== Early life ==
Henderson was born in Dallas, Texas, the son of Sharon Lea Henderson. He grew up in Tulsa, Oklahoma, where he graduated from Memorial High School.

Due to heterochromia, Henderson's eyes are of different colors; his left eye is green, while the right is blue.

== Career ==
Henderson competed in the second season of The WB reality show Popstars and won a spot in the group Scene 23. After Scene 23, Henderson went on to pursue acting and modeling, as well as continuing his recording career. He appeared in advertisements for Skechers' 4Wheeler Skate shoes between 2002 and 2004. Henderson appeared in several sitcoms, such as Maybe It's Me, Do Over, One on One, Rodney and 8 Simple Rules... for Dating My Teenage Daughter. Henderson made his film debut in the 2003 straight-to-video horror movie Leeches!, and appeared in The Girl Next Door the following year.

In 2005, Henderson was cast in the lead role on the short-lived FX drama series Over There. In film, he is best known for his role in Step Up (2006) as the boyfriend of Jenna Dewan's character. He later played main roles in the horror films Fingerprints (2006), and April Fool's Day (2008), as well as in the romantic comedy The Jerk Theory (2009). For The Jerk Theory, he also recorded the soundtrack album, which was released in 2009. Henderson also appeared in Yours, Mine & Ours (2005), Broken Bridges (2006), and Rushlights (2012). From 2006 to 2007, Henderson co-starred in the ABC comedy-drama series Desperate Housewives as Austin McCann, the nephew of the character Edie Britt, played by Nicollette Sheridan. From 2008 to 2009, he appeared on the CW's 90210, and guest-starred in CSI: Crime Scene Investigation. In 2010, he was cast as the lead character in the unsold CW pilot Betwixt.

In February 2011, Henderson landed a lead role in the TNT revival of the CBS prime-time soap opera Dallas. Henderson played the character of John Ross Ewing III, the son of Sue Ellen (Linda Gray) and J.R. Ewing (Larry Hagman). TNT's Dallas premiered on June 13, 2012. Several critics called Henderson the "breakout star" of the series. Henderson's onscreen chemistry with Julie Gonzalo (Pamela Rebecca Barnes) was praised in the second season. The series was cancelled by TNT after three seasons in 2014. In 2015, Henderson was cast in the male lead role opposite Christine Evangelista in the E! drama series The Arrangement. Henderson portrayed Kyle West, one of the hottest actors in Hollywood. On May 29, 2018, the series concluded after two seasons.

In 2019, he starred in the Blake Shelton produced Time For Me To Come Home For Christmas on the Hallmark Channel, which kicked off the channel's Christmas programming.

== Personal life ==
Henderson dated singer Ashlee Simpson from 2002 to 2003, former reality show participant Kendal Sheppard from 2006 to 2007, and television personality Andrea Boehlke from 2013 to 2016. Sheppard maintains that Henderson is the father of her first born son and claimed in 2008 that Henderson was denying paternity or responsibility.

== Legal issues ==
On December 12, 2018, Los Angeles police arrested Henderson on suspicion of having broken into his neighbor's house earlier that day. The neighbors allegedly identified Henderson with two other men on surveillance footage taken during the reported crime. TMZ reported that Henderson had an airtight alibi for the night of the robbery at his neighbor's home, as he provided security footage that allegedly shows he never left his apartment. On December 19, 2018, the LAPD dropped charges against Henderson due to insufficient evidence.

== Filmography ==
=== Film ===
Year	Title	Role	Notes
2003	Leeches!	Jason	Direct-to-video
2004	The Girl Next Door	Pep Rally Jock	
2005	Yours, Mine & Ours	Nick De Pietro	
2006	Step Up	Brett Dolan	
2006	Broken Bridges	Wyatt	
2006	Fingerprints	Penn	
2008	April Fool's Day	Blaine Cartier	Direct-to-video
2009	The Jerk Theory	Adam Dynes	
2013	Rushlights	Billy Brody	
2014	Swelter	Boyd	
TBA	Bulldogs		Filming

=== Television ===
Year	Title	Role	Notes
2001	Popstars 2	Himself - Scene 23	13 episodes
2002	Maybe It's Me	Jackson	Episode: "The Rick's in Love Episode"
2002	Do Over	Jake	Episode: "Halloween Kiss"
2003	Newton	Eli	TV pilot
2003	She Spies	Raine	Episode: "Rane of Terror"
2002–2003	One on One	Josh McEntire	10 episodes
2004	The Deerings	Kyle	TV pilot
2004	The Ashlee Simpson Show	Himself	Episode: "Ashlee Moves Onward and Upward"
2004	North Shore	Derek	Episode: "Tessa"
2004	8 Simple Rules	Tyler	Episode: "Out of the Box"
2005	Rodney	Wes	Episode: "Talent Show"
2005	Over There	PFC Bo "Texas" Rider Jr.	Main cast (13 episodes)
2006–2007	Desperate Housewives	Austin McCann	16 episodes
2008–2009	90210	Sean Cavanaugh	3 episodes
2009	CSI: Crime Scene Investigation	Calvin Crook	Episode: "Bloodsport"
2010	Betwixt	Nix Uyarak	TV pilot
2012–2014	Dallas	John Ross Ewing III	Main role (40 episodes)
2017–2018	The Arrangement	Kyle West	Main role (20 episodes)
2018	Time for Me to Come Home for Christmas	Heath Sawyer	Hallmark Channel television film
2021–2022	All Rise	Collier Owens	4 episodes

=== Music videos ===
Year	Title	Artist
2002	"I Really Don't Think So"	Scene 23
2007	"He Said She Said"	Ashley Tisdale
2007	"Not Like That"	Ashley Tisdale
2008	"Suddenly"	Ashley Tisdale
2013	"Stay"	Florida Georgia Line
