= Michael Gingold =

American journalist

- Born: United States
- Occupations: Journalist, screenwriter, film actor

Michael Gingold is an American journalist, screenwriter, and former editor-in-chief of Fangoria magazine.

== Career ==
In his teen years, young horror fan Michael Gingold wrote and self-published the photocopied horror-review fanzine Scareaphanalia and made Super8 short films. His longest was the 40-minute Deadly Exchange, about a slasher killing foreign-exchange students. From 1985 to 1989, he attended New York University's film school. During this time he made the 19-minute horror short Hands Off, inspired by writer Clive Barker's short story "The Body Politic."

In 1988, during his junior year, he began writing freelance for the horror-film magazine Fangoria. Two years later, he joined the staff as associate editor and eventually becoming managing editor. In October 2015 he became editor-in-chief, Eight months later, he was replaced in that position by former managing editor Ken Hanley. Filmmaker Guillermo del Toro, a Gingold supporter, took to social media to voice his disappointment with the decision. Fangoria ceased print publication with its October 2015 issue, releasing four additional issues online only. Gingold went on to become head online writer of the horror magazine Rue Morgue. In February 2018, the Texas-based entertainment company Cinestate, which had bought Fangoria, announced the magazine would be revived as a quarterly print publication, and that Gingold would return as a columnist. As of 2021, he continues to write for Fangoria.

Gingold's other writing credits include features and reviews for The Motion Picture Guide, the Blockbuster Video Guide, Movies on TV and Videocassette, IndieWire, and Birth. Movies. Death.

As a screenwriter, Gingold's credits include Leeches, Halloween Night, Shadow: Dead Riot, and Ring of Darkness. He has also appeared as an actor in The Suckling, The Blood Shed, A Return to Salem's Lot, Troma's War, The Toxic Avenger Part II and The Toxic Avenger Part III: The Last Temptation of Toxie, Sweatshop and has had a recurring role in the Light & Dark Productions' series of movies including Fear of the Dark, The Tenement, Sins of the Father, and Fairview Falls. As of 2017, he had completed a script titled The Doll for Italian filmmaker Dante Tomaselli, and the two were seeking financing.

He has published two books containing vintage horror-movie advertisements: Ad Nauseam: Newsprint Nightmares from the 1980s (2018) and Ad Nauseam II: Newsprint Nightmares from the 1990s and 2000s (2019). An expanded edition of the first book, with 125 more pages and a slight retitling, was published in 2021 with a foreword by genre filmmaker Joe Dante. As a filmmaker, he completed the Super8 movie Mindstalker by 1998, but it does not seem to have been distributed.

== Other ==
On December 8, 2016, Gingold lectured at Brooklyn's Miskatonic Institute of Horror Studies on horror film and television shot in New York City. With writer Chris Poggiali, he presented the lecture "Horror on the Hudson: Westchester County in Horror Cinema" at the First Annual Sleepy Hollow International Film Festival, held in October 2019 in Tarrytown, New York.

== Bibliography ==
- Gingold, Michael (2017). Frightfest Guide to Monster Movies. Dark Heart of Cinema. FAB Press. ISBN 978-1903254950.. Foreword by filmmaker Frank Henenlotter
- Gingold, Michael, ed. (2018). Ad Nauseam: Newsprint Nightmares from the 1980s. 1984 Publishing. ISBN 978-1948221054..
- Gingold, Michael, ed. (2019). Ad Nauseam II: Newsprint Nightmares from the 1990s and 2000s. 1984 Publishing. ISBN 978-1948221122..
- Gingold, Michael, ed. (2021). Ad Nauseam: Newsprint Nightmares from the '70s and '80s (Expanded ed.). 1984 Publishing. ISBN 978-1948221184.. Foreword by Joe Dante.

=== As book contributor ===
- Contributor, Nash, Jay Robert; Ross, Stanley Ralph, eds. (1994). The Motion Picture Guide. Cinebooks. p. 644.
- Contributor, Blockbuster Video Guide to Movies and Videos 1995. Dell Publishing. 1994.
- Contributor, Blockbuster Video Guide to Movies and Videos 1996. Dell Publishing. 1995. p. 3. ISBN 978-0440221142.
- Essay: Halloween in Ackerman, Christian, ed. (2018). My Favorite Horror Movie: 48 Essays By Horror Creators On The Film That Shaped Them. Black Vortex Cinema. ISBN 978-1732270206..
