= Puppet Master: The Legacy =

- DVD cover
- Directed by: Charles Band
- Written by: C. Courtney Joyner; David Schmoeller
- Produced by: Charles Band; Kurt Iswarienko; Matt Wolpert
- Starring: Jacob Witkin; Kate Orsini
- Cinematography: Mac Ahlberg
- Edited by: Steven Nielson
- Music by: Richard Band
- Production company: Full Moon Entertainment
- Distributed by: Shadow Entertainment
- Release date: December 16, 2003
- Running time: 73 minutes
- Country: United States
- Language: English

Puppet Master: The Legacy is a 2003 direct-to-DVD horror film written by C. Courtney Joyner and David Schmoeller, and directed by Charles Band. It is the eighth installment in the Puppet Master franchise. It stars Jacob Witkin as an elderly Peter Hertz (a character who appeared as a child in Toulon's Revenge) and Kate Orsini as a mercenary hired to confront Hertz for information regarding the magic puppeteer André Toulon used to animate his puppets. The majority of the film consists of flashbacks using footage recycled from the previous seven films.

== Plot ==
At the Bodega Bay Inn in Bodega Bay, California, rogue agent Maclain reads André Toulon's diary, hoping to find the secret to the formula, but the diary bursts into flames. She travels down to the basement, finding a man, Eric Weiss, talking to the last Toulon puppets: Blade, Pinhead, Jester, Tunneler and Six-Shooter. Weiss explains that he knew Toulon before he died, and that he swore he wouldn't pass it to anyone else. When Maclain threatens him with a gun, Weiss takes out a tape recorder, and plays a recording that Toulon left him, detailing how Toulon came to possess the magic.

Cut back to present day, Weiss reveals that his real name is Peter Hertz, the boy who was saved by Toulon from the Nazis. After the conversation, an angered Maclain cripples Weiss, knowing he knows more about Toulon and his puppets' bloody legacy, such as Toulon's suicide. Weiss believes that Toulon only killed those who deserved to die. Maclain, however, brings up the subject of the murders that happened with the parapsychologists. After an argument over whether Toulon was good or evil, Maclain still threatens to kill Weiss. Weiss tells her that the puppets fought a war that was far more than anything they'd ever known, and then he plays another recording, which tells about Sutek's attempt to steal the elixir formula to kill the Puppet Master.

After the recording finished, Maclain tells Eric that she knows everything about Rick Myers, because before she came to the hotel, she went to collect Toulon's diary. Myers refused to cooperate, so she killed him and took the diary. Seeing one final recording, Maclain threatens him to play it. The recording talks about how there's always someone discovering Toulon's secret, even after his supposed death, always someone who didn't fully understand what a gift, or a "curse", the formula for the puppets really was. After the recording, Pinhead incapacitates Maclain, and Eric fatally shoots her with her gun. Minutes away from death, Maclain explains that's not what she wants, and she tells Weiss that when the puppets brought Toulon back to life, he resumed his final experiment, the one he started before he committed suicide: soul transference.

Maclain reveals that her true intention is to know what makes the puppets die once and for all. She explains that Toulon and all the subsequent Puppet Masters created immortals, souls trapped in wooden bodies, living every day in agony, wanting revenge on their Master, whose title now belongs to Weiss. Maclain dies. Weiss hears something and moves to see the immortals the Masters have created (off-screen). In the final shot, Weiss turns the gun on them and fires.

The film ends with a note: "The producers would like to thank all the cast and crew who have helped make the Puppet Master series a tremendous success over the years."

== Cast ==
- Kate Orsini as Maclain
- Jacob Witkin as Eric Weiss / Peter Hertz
- Guy Rolfe as André Toulon
- Greg Sestero as Young André Toulon (Retro)
- Ian Abercrombie as Dr. Hess (Toulon's Revenge)
- Brigitta Dau as Ilsa (Retro)
- Jack Donner as Afzel
- Stephen Blackehart as First Servant
- Sage Allen as Martha (II)
- George "Buck" Flower as Matthew
- Michelle Bauer as Lili (Toulon's Revenge)
- Gordon Currie as Rick Myers (4/5)
- George Peck as Dr. Magrew (Curse)
- Emily Harrison as Jane Magrew
- Josh Green as Robert 'Tank' Winsley
- Michael Guerin as Joey Carp

=== Featured puppets ===
- Blade
- Pinhead
- Jester
- Tunneler
- Six-Shooter

=== Archived footage puppets ===
- Leech Woman
- Torch
- Totem
- Djinn The Hobgoblin
- Decapitron
- Tank
- Retro Blade
- Retro Pinhead
- Drill Sergeant (Retro Tunneler)
- Retro Six-Shooter
- Cyclops
- Doctor Death

== Production ==
After producing the slasher film Bleed in 2002 at Blockbuster’s request, producer Charles Band entered negotiations with the company to make another Puppet Master film, as the series had proven to be a successful rental at Blockbuster stores. After losing distribution deals with Paramount, The Kushner-Locke Company, and Tempe Entertainment, the studio lacked the budget to produce a new feature-length film. Instead, they developed a plot that only required about half an hour of new footage, with the rest consisting of reused clips from the previous seven films. C. Courtney Joyner was hired to write the film, since he had not only been one of the writers of Puppet Master III: Toulon's Revenge but also served as a consultant on the canceled Puppet Wars series.

The clips used in the film were prechosen with the new scenes written around them. The idea for the film was to address and fix several of the plot holes and continuity errors that the later sequels had introduced. The new scenes were filmed in one day in a single room, set at the Bodega Bay Inn, a central location in the series.

== Release ==
Puppet Master: The Legacy was released direct to video on VHS in 2003, exclusively at Blockbuster. The film was released on DVD for the first time in 2004.

In 2017, the film was released on Blu-ray as part of a box set in a container resembling Andre Toulon's trunk. Due to issues with the original film negative, a lot of footage in this release was taken from the lower-quality VHS release. This Blu-ray was released in 2020 as part of a different box set that included the same contents, contained in a cardboard sleeve instead of the wooden trunk.
