= Blade: The Iron Cross =

- Release poster
- Directed by: John Lechago
- Screenplay by: Brockton McKinney
- Based on: Puppet Master by Charles Band; Kenneth J. Hall
- Produced by: Charles Band; Nakai Nelson
- Starring: Tania Fox; Vincent Cusimano; Griffin Blazi
- Edited by: Juan Patricio
- Music by: Richard Band
- Release date: July 7, 2020 (United States)
- Running time: 70 minutes
- Country: United States
- Language: English

Blade: The Iron Cross is a 2020 American horror action film directed by John Lechago. The film is the thirteenth entry in the Puppet Master franchise. It is a spinoff of the series and concentrates on the puppet Blade. It was released on July 7, 2020.

Blade: The Iron Cross marks the series’ first spin-off film, which would be followed by Puppet Master: Doktor Death, a spin-off of Retro Puppet Master, released in 2022.

== Plot ==
In 1944, Ivan leaves the puppets with Elisa and moves to Russia to continue brain research. Meanwhile, Elisa begins to suffer from vivid nightmares about Elsa's death and Major Kraus, (Note: As depicted in Puppet Master III: Toulon's Revenge) as well as premonitions of chaos. Blade, who lacks elixir and is only capable of small movements, feeds off of Elisa's psychic energy, which Elisa notices. While sharpening her knife, Elisa accidentally cuts herself, inadvertently creating a blood bond between herself and Blade. She uses her psychic powers to look inside Blade, hoping to discover who he was as a human. Meanwhile, Hess's former colleague and Nazi Dr. Hess continues the Deathcorp Project from California. American District Attorney James D. Madison funds the project and provides scans of the Scroll of Osiris, as well as photos and information about Toulon's puppets.

Blade escapes and spends the night hunting Nazis. Meanwhile, Elisa has dreams of the events playing out and feels a jolt of power every time Blade's knife is used. Later, Gloria Vasques, a Spanish nationalist spy, and her henchman break into Elisa's apartment to search for Blade and the Scroll of Osiris. They obtain the Scroll, and unbeknownst to them, are followed by Blade to Hauser's hideout. At the same time, Madison kidnaps Elisa and Detective Joe Gray, where he tortures Elisa for a translation of the Scroll. He reveals his plan to create a Death Ray that will kill half the population of California and revive them as zombies that will follow orders from the Nazis. Elisa refuses to do so before she uses her psychic bio-energy to shut the machine down. Afterward, Blade frees Joe and goes on a killing spree throughout the facility. Hauser inadvertently kills Gloria after a zombie intended to kill Blade attacks her instead.

Hauser uses a hammer to destroy Blade, but accidentally breathes in the bio-energy emitting from his corpse. As a result, Blade is fully reborn within Hauser and disembowels him. Hauser's dead man's switch goes off, activating the ray. Before it can fire, Blade climbs inside the machine and destroys it internally. The ray's destruction causes an explosion, destroying itself and the facility, which Blade, Elisa, and Joe manage to escape. In the aftermath, Elisa prints a story about a killer puppet foiling a Nazi plot, which readers do not believe. Joe and Blade break into Madison's office, where Blade kills him, staging the death as a suicide. Afterward, Joe sets out to find other Americans who are collaborating with the Nazi Party.

== Cast ==
- Tania Fox as Elisa Ivanov
- Vincent Cusimano as Detective Lieutenant Jonas (Joe) Gray
- Griffin Blazi as Barney
- Roy Abramsohn as Ingenieur Erich Hauser
- Bobby Reed as Prok
- Angelica Briones as Gloria
- Todd Gajdusek as District Attorney James D. Madison

=== Puppets ===
- Blade

== Release ==
The film was released by Full Moon Features as the first installment of their ‘Deadly Ten’ sub series.

== Reception ==
Film Threat said, "This is a Charles Band production after all, and what he ignores in plot and rehearsals, he makes up for with zombies, mad scientists, dumb cops, nudity and of course, the star of the show, the bloodthirsty puppet Blade. Band makes exploitation films the way they did for drive-ins and grindhouses in the ’60s and ’70s: short, sloppy, and entertaining as hell. Who needs a convoluted storyline when you have tits, gore, and a murderous puppet?"

Bloody Disgusting said the film "is definitely emblematic of the lower tier of the Puppet Master franchise. It may not be the absolute worst in the series and it’s technically a little less insulting than Puppet Master: The Legacy, but this feels like the death rattle of a corpse that’s been brought back to life with some half-baked resurrection potion."
