= Puppet Master (film) =

1989 American horror film by David Schmoeller

- Theatrical release poster
- Directed by: David Schmoeller
- Screenplay by: Kenneth J. Hall; David Schmoeller (as Joseph G. Collodi)
- Story by: Kenneth J. Hall; Charles Band
- Produced by: Hope Perello
- Starring: Paul Le Mat; Jimmie F. Skaggs; Irene Miracle; Robin Frates; Barbara Crampton; William Hickey
- Cinematography: Sergio Salvati
- Edited by: Thomas Meshelski
- Music by: Richard Band
- Production company: Full Moon Pictures
- Distributed by: Paramount Home Video
- Release date: October 12, 1989
- Running time: 90 minutes
- Country: United States
- Language: English
- Budget: $400,000

Puppet Master (also titled The Puppet Master and Puppetmaster) is a 1989 American horror film directed and co-written by David Schmoeller, from a story by executive producer Charles Band. It stars Paul Le Mat, Irene Miracle, Jimmie F. Skaggs, and William Hickey. The story follows a group of psychics who are plotted against by a former colleague, using puppets animated by an Egyptian spell.

The film was produced by Full Moon Features and originally distributed by Paramount Pictures. Originally intended for summer 1989 theatrical release, before being released on home video the following September, Puppet Master was ultimately pushed to a direct-to-video release on October 12, 1989, as Band felt this was likely to be more financially successful than the theatrical market. It was very popular and has since developed a large cult following, and an extensive franchise.

== Plot ==
In 1939, at the Bodega Bay Inn in California, an old puppeteer named André Toulon is putting the finishing touches on his newest puppet, Jester, before he brings it to life. Two Nazi spies approach Toulon's room while Kahn, another living puppet, warns him. Toulon calmly places all the animate puppets in a chest and hides it in a wall compartment. As the Nazis break down the door, Toulon dies by suicide.

Fifty years later, four psychic acquaintances are contacted telepathically by Neil Gallagher, who resides at the Bodega Bay Inn. Professor Alex Whitaker has a nightmare involving Neil and leeches, Dana Hadley has a premonition of her own death, and psychic researchers Frank Forrester and Carissa Stamford are contacted in a manner not revealed. Dana, who has located Toulon's secret compartment, arranges a meeting at the Inn. Upon arrival, they meet Neil’s wife, Megan, for the first time and learn that Neil has killed himself and left instructions for Megan. While paying last respects, Dana stabs a long pin into Neil’s corpse to verify that he is dead.

The psychics experience different confusing visions of Neil. Another animated figure, Pinhead, crawls out of Neil's casket.

At dinner, Dana irritates Megan, forcing her to leave the table. Alex follows Megan and describes their history with her husband: Carissa is a psychometrist, Dana is a clairvoyant fortune teller, and Alex experiences precognition via dreams. Neil was researching alchemy and with Frank's help discovered that the Ancient Egyptians had created a method of animating figurines, a power previously discovered by Toulon. Because Neil had not made contact in a while, the four associates thought that he had made a breakthrough and abandoned them. They now want whatever Neil discovered.

That night, Pinhead kills the Gallaghers’ housekeeper, Teresa, with a fireplace poker while she tends to the fireplace; as foreseen by Dana. Megan finds Gallagher's body upright in a chair and faints. Alex attends to her while the others return the body to the casket.

Another animated figure, Blade, is foiled by protective magic spells on Alex and Dana's rooms. It moves on to Carissa and Frank's room, where the couple is having very loud sex and disrupting Alex and Dana's sleep. Two more puppets, Tunneler and Leech Woman, enter. Tunneler kills Carissa when she investigates a noise under the bed. Frank, left bound and blindfolded by Carissa, becomes the victim of Leech Woman’s leeches.

Dana finds Gallagher's body in her room. She is attacked by Pinhead, who breaks her leg. Pinhead continues to assault her until she casts him aside and crawls to the elevator, where Blade fatally slashes her throat.

Alex suffers several nightmares. Megan wakes him and shows him Toulon's diary. She says that Neil found Toulon's secrets of animation. Alex has a vision of Neil. They rush downstairs to escape but find the bodies of Dana, Frank and Carissa in chairs around the dining table with Neil, revivified. Neil explains that his suicide was a necessary step in his plan, using Toulon's secrets to reanimate himself and become immortal. He reveals that he killed Megan's parents to gain full access to the inn. He expresses disgust for the animated puppets, and announces his intent to continue his experiments with human bodies. The puppets turn on Neil. Tunneler destroys Neil's legs. Blade pins him down while Leech Woman regurgitates a leech into his mouth. Pinhead breaks Neil’s neck.

The next day, Megan sees Alex off. Dana's taxidermized dog Leroy begins to walk on its own, revealing Megan has reanimated it.

== Cast ==
- William Hickey as André Toulon, the original puppet master.
- Paul Le Mat as Alex Whitaker, the main protagonist of the film; an anthropology professor at Yale University with the ability to dream of things yet to come
- Irene Miracle as Dana Hadley, a small-time, fairground psychic specializing in fortune telling and locating lost/missing objects
- Jimmie F. Skaggs as Neil Gallagher, the main antagonist of the film; he serves as the evil puppet master orchestrating the deaths of his former friends and colleagues at the hands of the animate puppets
- Robin Frates as Megan Gallagher, Neil's wife; her parents owned and operated the Bodega Bay, which she inherited when they died and which is also where she and Neil first met
- Matt Roe as Frank Forrester, a psychic researcher for Pensa Research Inc (PRI) & partner to Carissa; together they specialize in sexual psychic readings
- Kathryn O'Reilly as Carissa Stamford, a psychometrist for Pensa Research Inc (PRI) & partner to Frank, she often receives visions from past sexual trauma victims or couples being intimate together but can reconstruct the emotional history of any object through touch
- Mews Small as Theresa, the Gallaghers' housekeeper
- Barbara Crampton as Woman at Carnival
- David Boyd as Buddy
- Peter Frankland and Andrew Kimbrough as Assassins

=== Featured puppets ===
- Blade (voiced by Bert Rosario)
- Jester (voiced by Michael Laide)
- Pinhead (voiced by Edwin Cook)
- Tunneler (voiced by Tim Dornberg)
- Leech Woman (voiced by Linda Cook)
- Shredder Kahn
- Gengie

== Production ==
=== Development ===
According to executive producer Charles Band, the initial idea for Puppet Master originated from the success of one of his earlier films, Dolls, which had killer toys. Its name was inspired by Band's The Dungeonmaster. Band commissioned a poster that featured some early puppet designs, and hired Kenneth J. Hall to write the screenplay. Hall's script originally had a group of flamboyant witches and warlocks investigating the death of their missing friend, before getting killed by his army of puppets. David Schmoeller was hired as the director, and rewrote the script under the pseudonym "Joseph G. Collodi", alongside an uncredited J. S. Cardone. Schmoeller's script changed the witches and warlocks into psychics. Years later, Hall and Schmoeller stated that Band did not properly pay them residuals. Schmoeller also said that Band never gave him credit for the film, citing that as the reason for him not being involved in its sequels.

=== Filming ===
Cinematographer Sergio Salvati was hired as director of photography, providing an Italian look reminiscent of his work on Lucio Fulci's films to fit Puppet Master's occasionally dreamlike, surrealist nature.

The film was shot in Pasadena and Riverside in California in December 1988. The Mission Inn was used as the fictional Bodega Bay Inn in various scenes, and the Castle Green Hotel was used as the main hotel exterior. Exterior shots of the building were made using a miniature model of Castle Green, built by David W. Allen, and combined with matte paintings to create the illusion of an oceanside cliff setting.

=== Casting ===
Casting was done by Vivian Levy. Actors and actresses cast for the film included William Hickey, Paul Le Mat, Irene Miracle, Jimmie F. Skaggs, Robin Frates, Matt Roe, Kathryn O'Reilly, Mews Small, Barbara Crampton, David Boyd, Peter Frankland, and Andrew Kimbrough. Hickey was Le Mat's acting teacher, and shot his scene as André Toulon in one day, being present on set for six hours. The puppets' voices were provided by Bert Rosario (Blade), Michael Laide (Jester), Edwin Cook (Pinhead), Tim Dornberg (Tunneler), and Linda Cook (Leech Woman).

=== Special effects ===
The puppet effects and stop motion animation were done by David W. Allen, Paul Gentry, Dennis Gordon, Donna Littleford, Harvey Mayo, Jene Omens, Mark Rappaport, Patrick Simmons, Cindy Sorensen, Brett B. White, Thomas E. Surprenant, John Teska, and Justin Kohn at David Allen Productions. The puppets' designs drew inspiration from Italian comedy, French Grand Guignol theatre, German Expressionism, and Renaissance art. Kenneth J. Hall's script originally had a spy puppet named Skull, who would become the puppet Blade (initially named "Switch Blade"). Blade's face and hair were based on Klaus Kinski, whom Schmoeller had worked with on Crawlspace, another film produced by Band. He was operated by five puppeteers. Pinhead's fists during scenes in which he crawls out of the casket and is punching were portrayed by Sorensen. Tunneler was modeled after Benito Mussolini. Blade, Jester, and Tunneler used the same body, only swapping the costume, head and hands between shots. Leech Woman's mouth was made of foam latex to allow for more flexibility whenever she "coughs" up a leech. Only three quarters of the leech mechanism emerged from of the puppet, and a camera cut created the illusion of a leech coming out of her mouth. The Asian puppet (named "Shredder Kahn" in the Action Lab Comics) looking out of André Toulon's window at the beginning of the film was a marionette of Burmese alchemist Zawgyi. A six-armed ninja puppet holding multiple swords was planned to appear in the film, but was cut since it would be too expensive to create. The idea would be reused for the cowboy puppet Six-Shooter in Puppet Master III: Toulon's Revenge. The makeup effects were done by Simmons, Laura Connolly, Lisa Lowe, Carlann Matz, Valerie McKnight, and Steve Neill. The blood in the scene where Neil Gallagher dies was dyed green to avoid having the film receive an X rating.

=== Music ===
The film's score was composed by Richard Band, consisting of synthesizer arrangements of Pino Donaggio's music for Tourist Trap.

== Release ==
Puppet Master was released on VHS by Paramount Home Video on October 12, 1989. The film saw its first DVD release on June 13, 2000, through Full Moon Home Video.

Following a release by Wizard Entertainment under The Puppet Master in March 2008, Wizard later released a Blu-ray in July 2010. Full Moon Features simultaneously released a remastered DVD.

In 2014, Echo Bridge Home Entertainment released the "Killjoy and Puppet Master: The Complete Collections" alongside the Killjoy series, although both series have since produced additional sequels.

On April 10, 2018, Full Moon issued both a Blu-ray and a limited-edition vintage VHS collection, with the latter having only 3,000 units produced, and the first 300 being signed and numbered by Charles Band.

In June 2025, an uncut version of the film was released for the first time on a limited edition VHS.

== Reception ==
On Rotten Tomatoes, the film holds an approval rating of 43% based on seven reviews, with a weighted average rating of 4/10.

TV Guide gave a negative review calling it "a pointless variation on the killer-doll genre".

Joe Bob Briggs gave the film four stars, calling it "the best movie of the year". Dread Central awarded a score of 3/5, commending the atmosphere, soundtrack and set designs, but criticized the acting, weak script and first act. The reviewer concluded their review by writing, "Puppet Master isn't what I would call a great film, but its heart is in the right place, and I've always been a huge fan of the evil doll subgenre of horror, making the film's shortcomings easily forgivable." Wes R. from Oh the Horror.com gave a positive review stating, "Despite its flaws, Puppet Master emerges as one of the more enjoyable of the 'killer toy' type horror films".

== Legacy ==
The success as a cult film inspired a franchise that would span decades to come. Five sequels followed: Puppet Master II (1990), Puppet Master 4 (1993), Puppet Master 5 (1994), Curse of the Puppet Master (1998) and Puppet Master: The Legacy (2003).

The third film, entitled Toulon's Revenge (1991), serves as a prequel, as would Retro Puppet Master (1999). Puppet Master: Axis of Evil (2010) began a loose prequel trilogy, followed by Axis Rising (2012) and Axis Termination (2017).

In 2020, a spin-off focusing on the puppet Blade was released, Blade: The Iron Cross. Another, Puppet Master: Doktor Death, was released in 2022, based on a character from Retro.

Puppet Master vs. Demonic Toys, a crossover with fellow Full Moon franchise Demonic Toys, premiered on the Sci-Fi Channel in 2004.

Puppet Master: The Littlest Reich, a reboot produced by Fangoria, was released in 2018.

== Video game ==
In September 2021, Full Moon announced a partnership with independent game studio 'October Games' to release an official Puppet Master game, which was released to Steam on March 1, 2023.

== Bibliography ==
- Brehmer, Nat (September 27, 2021). Puppet Master Complete: A Franchise History. McFarland Publishing. ISBN 978-1-476-67630-2.
