= Puppet Master X: Axis Rising =

2012 American horror film

- Release poster
- Directed by: Charles Band
- Written by: Charles Band; Shane Bitterling
- Produced by: Charles Band
- Starring: Kip Canyon; Jean Louise O'Sullivan; Oto Brezina; Scott Anthony King; Stephanie Sanditz; Brad Potts; Kurt Sinclair; Paul Thomas Arnold; Terumi Shimazu; Ian Roberts; Nigel McGuinness
- Cinematography: Terrance Ryker
- Edited by: Danny Draven
- Music by: Richard Band
- Production company: Full Moon Features
- Distributed by: Full Moon Features
- Release date: October 9, 2012
- Running time: 88 minutes
- Country: United States
- Language: English

Puppet Master X: Axis Rising is a 2012 American horror film and is the tenth entry in the Puppet Master film series. Produced and directed by Charles Band, it is a direct sequel to 2010's Puppet Master: Axis of Evil and introduces new puppets named Blitzkrieg, Bombshell, Kamikaze, and Weremacht, who fight alongside the Nazis. Puppet Master X: Axis Rising was released on October 9, 2012, by Full Moon Features. A sequel, Puppet Master: Axis Termination, was released in 2017.

== Plot ==
Ozu, the villain from the previous film, walks down a dark alley only to be stopped by Kommandant Moebius, the Nazi general. Ozu offers him the puppet Tunneler, in exchange for her freedom. Moebius gladly takes the prize, which immediately kills SS Soldier #1. Moebius "sets her free" by shooting her in the head. While this takes place, the puppet Blade watches from the shadows.

The next morning, Danny and Beth are recovering at Danny's house. Danny tells the rest of the puppets that he couldn't revive Ninja, but they will get back Tunneler. Blade appears and informs them of Ozu's death and Tunneler's capture by the Nazis. Danny and Beth respond to a knock at the door only to be grabbed by mysterious men in suits.

Meanwhile, in a secret lab in Chinatown, Docter Freuhoffer, a captured Austrian doctor with a fixation on dolls, is working for Moebius to develop a machine that can reanimate the dead. The seductive Uschi, a Nazi, tries to motivate the doctor only to be interrupted by Moebius. He demands a demonstration of the machine. He brings in a Japanese man and slits his throat. The machine makes him walk for a moment only for him to decay and fall down. Freuhoffer promises to fix the machine. Moebius reminds him that if he doesn't, his daughter will be killed. Moebius then presents him with Tunneler to study.

Danny and Beth are revealed to have been taken to a military base. Major Collins commends them for thwarting the bombing of the weapons factory in the previous film. He also informs Danny that General Porter will be in town and that he will present him with a medal. To protect them, he has Sergeant Stone assigned as their bodyguard. Stone gets on Beth's nerves with his sexist attitude as he settles in.

Back at the lab, Freuhoffer is examining Tunneler when Uschi enters and tries to again seduce him. Moebius enters and in a rage shoots Uschi through the head. Freuhoffer tries using the fluid he extracted from Tunneler in his machine to revive Uschi but it fails. Freuhoffer shows Moebius his newest creation, Bombshell, a puppet made in Uschi's image with machineguns in her chest. Moebius, while amused, still wants his machine completed.

Danny and Beth discuss how they can help Stone with their cause when Danny introduces a dumbfounded Stone to the puppets, telling him that the Nazis have one of them that needs to be recovered. They take Blade and Pinhead to Chinatown to locate the Nazi base. They are ambushed by Bombshell and must retreat. Bombshell returns to the lab and Freuhoffer presents three other puppets: a werewolf called Weremacht, a tank called Blitzkrieg, and a suicide bomber named Kamikaze.

Danny and the others are preparing for the award ceremony when Leech Woman tries to tell them something. During the awards, Freuhoffer's puppets attack, and kill Major Collins. Danny's puppets take them on but are beaten back. Porter, grateful to Danny, allows him to enter the army. Danny and the others ponder how to stop the Nazi puppets when Leech Woman pulls out Six-Shooter's head.

Danny and the team locate the lab and take out the Nazi guards. Once inside, they locate and recover Tunneler, but are stopped by Moebius and Freuhoffer's puppets. The puppets fight and this time the Nazi puppets are beaten. Beth holds Freuhoffer at gunpoint, but lets him explain himself. Moebius and Stone fight and just as Stone gets the upper hand, Moebius stabs and kills him. Moebius comes at Danny, but is shot down by Six-Shooter. Moebius, still alive, pulls out a gun and plans to shoot Danny, who states "Never screw with America". Blade then comes from behind and stabs Moebius. Beth and Freuhoffer come out and tells Kamikaze to detonate, destroying the lab and Moebius. Danny and Beth let Freuhoffer go, but as he leaves, the others fail to notice he has a bottle of the puppets' fluid.

== Cast ==
- Kip Canyon as Danny
- Jean Louise O'Sullivan as Beth
- Terumi Shimazu as Ozu
- Scott Anthony King as Kommandant Moebius
- Paul Thomas Arnold as General Porter
- Brad Potts as Sergeant Stone
- Stephanie Sanditz as Uschi
- Kurt Sinclair as Major Collins
- Oto Brezina as Dr. Freuhoffer
- Glenn Zhang as Chinese Man
- Ian Roberts as SS Soldier #1
- Jesse Hlubik as SS Soldier #2
- Michael Ulmer as SS Soldier #3
- Danielle Stewart as Leech Woman (voice) (Uncredited)
- Kenichi Iwabuchi as Kamikaze (voice) (Uncredited)

== Featured puppets ==
- Blade
- Pinhead
- Leech Woman
- Jester
- Tunneler
- Six Shooter

=== Nazi puppets ===
These new puppets are Nazi puppets, created by Professor Freuhoffer.

- Blitzkrieg
- Bombshell
- Weremacht
- Kamikaze

Among Doctor Freuhoffer's dolls is Freakshow's robotic baby, the Zuni killing doll and Drill Sergeant's head from Killjoy Goes to Hell, Trilogy of Terror and Retro Puppet Master.

== Production ==
Following a four-year hiatus after Puppet Master vs. Demonic Toys, a trilogy of prequels set during World War II was announced in August 2008, with the first film, Puppet Master: Axis of Evil, released in 2010. In October 2011, the second film was announced under the working title Puppet Master Forever. The title was eventually changed to Puppet Master X: Axis Rising. Despite being the eleventh film in the series, the inclusion of the Roman numeral X (10) was an intentional decision intended to reassure fans that the Demonic Toys crossover film was not canon.

The film was written by newcomer Shane Bitterling. Bitterling had met Full Moon founder Charles Band during a memorial service for fellow screenwriter Domonic Muir, who had written the previous film and died in September 2010. Bitterling helped Band with some of Muir's unfinished scripts and became his first choice to write the next Puppet Master film. Band directed the film because he created the series and felt it was finally time to direct one himself.

Bitterling was instructed not to include the Ninja puppet from Axis of Evil, as Band stated, "We're not using the ninja. Nobody liked that one." The character Bombshell was based on an unused puppet from the canceled Puppet Wars spin off series. Kip Canyon and Jean Louise O'Sullivan were recast as Danny and Beth, replacing Levi Fiehler and Jenna Gallaher.

The film was heavily restricted by budget constraints. Scenes intended to take place in large spaces were instead shot in small rooms, and without the involvement of any stop-motion animators, the puppets' movement was limited.

== Sequel ==
In September 2015, Charles Band of Full Moon announced that a sequel, Puppet Master: Axis Termination, was in development. Filming began in 2016 and concluded the same year. The film was released as a three-episode series before being released in its full form on September 15, 2017.

It was followed by a spin-off titled Blade: The Iron Cross and released in 2020.

== Reception ==
The film was met with mostly negative reviews. A reviewer for Dread Central gave it a score of one-half out of five, calling it "every bit as terrible as you might think, and then some". Film critic Dave Harlequin also gave a negative review with a score of 2.0/10, calling it "by far the worst release in the near 25-year lifespan of Puppet Master". Cinema Crazed praised Axis Rising, calling it "a solid horror film".
