= David W. Allen =

American animator and film director (1944–1999)

- Born: October 22, 1944; Los Angeles, California, United States
- Died: August 16, 1999 (aged 54); Burbank, California, United States
- Occupation: Stop motion model animator

David W. Allen (October 22, 1944 – August 16, 1999) was an American film and television stop motion model (puppet) animator.

Allen provided special effects on such productions as The Howling, Twilight Zone: The Movie, Young Sherlock Holmes (for which he earned an Academy Award for Best Visual Effects nomination), Willow and Honey, I Shrunk the Kids. He also had a long association with producer Charles Band, working on such films as Dolls, Puppet Master, Bride of Re-Animator, Subspecies and Demonic Toys.

== Career ==
Some of Allen's earliest animation work can be seen in the 1970 16mm student film Equinox, which was expanded from a short film to a feature-length film by Jack H. Harris and re-titled The Beast for VHS video release in the 1980s.

Although he had been working for years in animation, mostly doing commercials like the Pillsbury Doughboy, Allen made a splash on movie viewers when he animated the "Nesuahyrrah" monster who appears at the climax of the semi-porn low-brow parody comedy Flesh Gordon produced by Howard Ziehm in 1974. The film also featured an animation sequence from long-time Allen's friend Jim Danforth.

Allen's contributed model animation to a Volkswagen commercial made in 1972 in which King Kong spots a giant version of the car from his Empire State Building perch in New York. Climbing down from the building, Kong puts his human "date" into the passenger seat, gets in the car, and drives down Fifth Avenue out of sight. The spot aired only once on network TV and, in spite of favorable public response, was pulled because VW executives decided that they did not like the image of an ape driving their car.

Allen joined with Danforth to provide model animation for the low-budget horror film The Crater Lake Monster (1977). He also animated the aliens in the low-budget science fiction film Laserblast (1978).

With Danforth, Ray Harryhausen, various other model animators, visual effects artists, film producers and directors, Allen helped organize an event in March 1983 at Mann's Chinese Theater commemorating the fiftieth anniversary of the release of King Kong, loaning his VW Kong model for display at the Roosevelt Hotel across the street from the theater.

Allen was also hired to animate the little flying saucers for the hit feature-length theatrical film Batteries Not Included (1987), a story that was originally intended to be an episode of Spielberg's Amazing Stories TV series. Allen and his crew animated the hallucinations and creatures in Barry Levinson's 1985 film Young Sherlock Holmes, earning an Academy Award Nomination in 1985.

His production company, David Allen Productions, did visual effects and model animation for the bizarre monster movie Freaked in 1992.

David Allen and his production company associates continued to nurture a long-term association with Charles Band, producing animation and other effects for a series of Band produced and/or directed fantasy films released either theatrically and direct to video markets by Paramount Pictures during the 1980s and 90s. Some of the films in this series are the Puppet Master films, the Prehysteria series, the Demonic Toys films, and various impressive one-shot productions such as the skeletons of dinosaurs that come to life and do battle in the film Doctor Mordrid.

Up until his death from cancer in 1999, Allen had been intermittently working on the stop motion effects for the film The Primevals, his own production. This personal project dated from early in his career, in the late 1960s, when he pitched an epic fantasy to Hammer Film executives. Allen developed the idea over the years, and in 1978 he began production with producer Charles Band. The film was the subject of a cover story in Cinefantastique Magazine that year, but despite the interest, the production was shut down, then revived twice. Allen eventually completed principal photography but the film was still in post-production by the time of his death. The film was eventually revived by Charles Band and Allen protégé Chris Endicott, who completed the animation work. In 2023, a completed version of the film was released.

Allen's production company, now helmed by Endicott, continues to do effects work on various films.

== Personal life ==
In 1995, Allen was married to Donita Woodruff, whom he met in 1990. Woodruff learned that Allen had previously dated a woman named Valerie Taylor intermittently starting in 1985 and was still seeing her, which led to a dispute between Woodruff and Taylor. Woodruff discovered that Taylor was a trans woman and that Allen had paid for her sex change operation. She also suspected that Taylor had a criminal past, and found enough evidence to persuade the police to arrest her in 1996 for a 1979 murder in South Carolina. Taylor pleaded self-defense and served two years. Allen and Woodruff were divorced in 1998.

== Visual effects ==
- 2023 The Primevals (Writer, Director, Special Effects; completed posthumously)
- 1996 Special Effects: Anything Can Happen (documentary short) (stop motion animator: King Kong sequence)
- 1996 The Arrival (visual effects – uncredited)
- 1996 Oblivion 2: Backlash (visual effects director – as David Allen)
- 1996 The Legend of Galgameth (visual effects supervisor)
- 1994 Puppet Master 5 (video) (puppet effects supervisor – as David Allen)
- 1994 Shrunken Heads (visual effects coordinator – as David Allen)
- 1994 Oblivion (special visual effects)
- 1994 Bloodlust: Subspecies III (video) (stop motion supervisor)
- 1993 Puppet Master 4 (video) (puppet effects supervisor – as David Allen)
- 1993 Dollman vs. Demonic Toys (video) (special effects animation)
- 1993 Freaked (stop motion animation)
- 1993 Prehysteria! (special effects)
- 1993 Robot Wars (visual effects supervisor)
- 1992 Doctor Mordrid (special effects animation, visual effects – as David Allen)
- 1992 Demonic Toys (video) (stop motion animation)
- 1991 Puppet Master III: Toulon's Revenge (video) (stop motion animator: David Allen Productions, visual effects producer: David Allen Productions)
- 1991 Subspecies (visual effects director)
- 1991 Oscar (animated main title, visual effects – as David Allen)
- 1990 Puppet Master II (video) (Director, visual effects supervisor: David Allen Productions)
- 1990 Robot Jox ( visual effects – as David Allen)
- 1990 Bride of Re-Animator (special effects – as David Allen, special effects supervisor: David Allen Productions, special makeup effects: David Allen Productions, stop motion animation and miniatures: David Allen Productions)
- 1989 Puppet Master (video) (puppet animator, visual effects supervisor)
- 1989 Enemies, a Love Story (special effects)
- 1989 Honey, I Shrunk the Kids (stop motion animator/stop motion ant crew, stop motion animator: ant sequence – as David Allen)
- 1989 Ghostbusters II (character performer: ILM – as David Allen)
- 1988 Ghoulies II (stop motion sequences)
- 1988 Willow (chief puppeteer – as David Allen)
- 1988 Pulse Pounders (visual effects supervisor)
- 1987 *batteries not included (chief puppeteer: uncredited, ILM visual effects: credited as rod puppet and stop motion supervisor)
- 1987 Dolls (special visual effects)
- 1986 Eliminators (special optical effects)
- 1985 Young Sherlock Holmes (chief puppeteer – as David Allen, pastry sequence motion supervisor: ILM – as David Allen)
- 1985 The Stuff (special visual effects – as David Allen)
- 1984 The Dungeonmaster (Directed one segment, visual effects designer – as David Allen)
- 1983 Twilight Zone: The Movie (visual effects – segment 4 / as David Allan)
- 1983 The Hunger (stop motion animator: monkey sequence – as David Allen)
- 1982 Q (special visual effects – as David Allen)
- 1982 White Dog (prosthetics)
- 1981 Caveman (visual effects supervisor – as David Allen)
- 1981 The Howling (stop motion animation – as David Allen)
- 1980 The Day Time Ended (dimensional animation – as David Allen, technical advisor – as David Allen)
- 1980 Witches' Brew (creator: "Lucifer" demon – as David Allen)
- 1978 Laserblast (animation effects)
- 1977 The Crater Lake Monster (stop motion supervisor)
- 1974 Flesh Gordon (stop motion)
- 1970 When Dinosaurs Ruled the Earth (stop motion effects)
- 1970 Equinox (special photographic effects, stop motion effects)
