= Tunneller =

Tunneller or Tunneler may refer to:

- A worker in a tunnel
- Tunnel boring machine
- Tunneler, demonic puppet in List of Puppet Master characters
