= Teto the Clown =

Teto, or Teto the Clown, is among the most popular of the children's toy clown puppets created by Hazelle Hedges Rollins for her company in Kansas City, Missouri.

The Teto the Clown marionette product dates to the 1950s and is made of Tenite plastic. It wears a red and white clown suit with a matching hat and is controlled with seven strings on an "airplane control". It was invented by Hazelle Hedges Rollins, a notable puppeteer that invented over 300 characters. Her invention of the airplane control for marionettes, which is used in Teto, revolutionized puppet design.

== In other media ==
- Teto was seen in Puppet Master and Puppet Master: Axis of Evil as a puppet decoration along with the other puppets.
- Teto also made his cameo appearance in the TV series of Gumby, Season 1 of Ep. 18, entitled "Toying Around" as a puppet decoration along with the other puppets.
