= Puppet Master vs Demonic Toys =

2004 TV film directed by Ted Nicolaou

- DVD cover
- Genre: Comedy horror
- Based on: Characters by: David S. Goyer; Charles Band; Kenneth J. Hall
- Written by: Courtney Joyner
- Directed by: Ted Nicolaou
- Starring: Corey Feldman; Vanessa Angel; Danielle Keaton; Silvia Šuvadová
- Music by: Peter Bernstein
- Country of origin: United States
- Original language: English

Production
- Executive producers: Jan Korbelin; Philip von Alvensleben; Sven Clement; Jeff Franklin; Donald Kushner
- Producers: Jeff Franklin; Bob Perkis; Jörg Westerkamp
- Cinematography: David Worth
- Editor: Terry Kelley
- Running time: 88 minutes
- Production companies: Anchor Bay Entertainment; ApolloProScreen Filmproduktion; FWE Picture Company; Jeff Franklin Productions
- Budget: $2.4 million

Original release
- Network: Sci Fi
- Release: December 18, 2004

Puppet Master vs Demonic Toys is a 2004 American comedy horror television film based on characters by Charles Band and Kenneth J. Hall (Puppet Master) and David S. Goyer (Demonic Toys). The film is directed by Ted Nicolaou and written by C. Courtney Joyner.

The film stars Corey Feldman as the great-grandnephew of André Toulon and Vanessa Angel as the head of a toy factory who plans to dominate the world using its latest line of holiday toys. It aired on December 18, 2004, on Sci Fi.

The film is a follow-up to 1993's Dollman vs. Demonic Toys and loosely a follow-up to Puppet Master: The Legacy. It was later followed by 2010's Puppet Master: Axis of Evil.

== Plot ==
Robert Toulon, the great-grandnephew of André Toulon and his daughter, Alexandra, have come into possession of the puppets and manage to bring them to life on Christmas Eve. Their success is noted by an evil toy manufacturer, Erica Sharpe, who is in possession of the demonic toys, but wants the puppets as the toys are not loyal to her. The demonic toys are impatient with Erica since they want to commit some murders. An initial attempt to steal the puppets is unsuccessful and only damages them with fire. Robert repairs them with new parts and weapons.

Unhappy, Erica summons the demon Bael in order to fulfill her plans of using many demonic toys to cause mass murder and gain control of the puppets. The demon agrees, but only if she brings him Alexandra. She succeeds in kidnapping the girl, making it necessary for Robert to come to her rescue with the aid of a police sergeant, Jessica Russell and the puppets. The group is able to overwhelm and destroy the toys, as well as rescue Alexandra. Since Erica was unable to keep her end of the deal, Bael takes her to hell without fulfilling her evil plans. As the human and puppet survivors go off to enjoy Christmas Day, Baby Oopsie Daisy is shown to have survived. Baby Oopsie Daisy tells everyone Merry Christmas.

== Cast ==
- Corey Feldman as Robert Toulon
- Danielle Keaton as Alexandra Toulon
- Vanessa Angel as Erica Sharpe
- Silvia Šuvadová as Sergeant Jessica Russell
- Nikoli Sotirov as Julian
- Dessislava Maicheva as Christina
- Velizar Binev as Mayor
- Angelina Hadjimitova as Claudia
- Anton Falk as Bael
- Rendan Ramsey as Baby Oopsie Daisy

=== Featured puppets ===
- Blade
- Pinhead
- Jester
- Six Shooter

=== Featured toys ===
- Baby Oopsie Daisy
- Jack Attack
- Grizzly Teddy

== Production ==
Plans for a Puppet Master and Demonic Toys crossover date back to as early as 1992, when Charles Band first mentioned the idea in the VideoZone for Demonic Toys, stating that Puppet Master 4 would be a crossover between the two series, with an estimated release window of fall 1992. The project never materialized, and Demonic Toys instead crossed over with Dollman a year later, in Dollman vs. Demonic Toys.

Another attempt at a crossover was announced in the VideoZone for Retro Puppet Master in 1999. This movie was supposed to be the first part of a larger plan to cross over Full Moon's franchises and was given a release window of 2000. Later the same year, Full Moon ran a contest in Tomart’s Action Figure Digest where fans could enter to possibly win a role as an extra in the film. The contest also mentioned that the film was set to shoot in LA later in the year. The film was mentioned at Toy Fair 2000 and was expected to be Full Moon's next release. The film did not make the 1999 shooting date or 2000 release window. Band mentioned the crossover again in some 2001 trade papers with a planned release window of May 2001. Again, the film did not make this estimated release date.

Work on the script for this version began around 2002, with the filming location having changed to Band's Italian castle that had previously been used in Castle Freak. In 2003, the original 1992 concept art appeared on some Full Moon merchandise to advertise the upcoming film. The final version of the script was completed around 2004. Around this time, Full Moon, already low on money, realized that the film was too expensive to do themselves and attempted to co-finance and co-produce it with the Sci-Fi Channel. After Sci-Fi provided their half of the budget, Full Moon realized they would be unable to contribute any funds toward the project and decided to sell the rights to the film entirely to Sci-Fi, losing creative control as a result. C. Courtney Joyner was brought in and entirely rewrote the script from scratch with the Sci-Fi Channel envisioning the film as a potential pilot for a TV series. However, they were unable to do this, as Band made sure with the deal that he would keep the rights to both series.

A few months before filming was scheduled to begin, the crew was informed about the Sci-Fi deal. Band had sold the project to a different producer, Jeff Franklin, who already agreed to a December 2004 premiere date. As a result, the film was heavily rushed, with pre-production beginning in June 2004 and a completed copy delivered to Sci-Fi Channel executives by November.

Director Ted Nicolaou was approached to direct Puppet Master vs Demonic Toys upon the recommendation of Charles Band. Intended to serve as a made-for-TV Christmas horror special for the Sci-Fi Channel, the film is a crossover with the Puppet Master series. Nicolaou was not a fan of the series since he "like[d] working with people, not with puppets", but wanted to direct as he had not had the chance to direct "in quite a long time". Filming took place in Bulgaria and had a limited budget of around 250,000. Both the Puppet Master and Demonic Toys characters were redesigned for the film. For Puppet Master, the original molds were sold at an auction and couldn't be recovered. For the Demonic Toys, director Ted Nicolaou said they were changed out of respect for Charles Band, since he wasn't involved with the film and felt copying John Carl Buechler's original designs would be unfair.

The role of Robert Toulon was originally written for an older actor and described as an "absent-minded professor" type. Courtney Joyner had Fred Williard in mind for the role. After Corey Feldman was cast, the script was slightly rewritten to accommodate his younger age.

== Release ==
Puppet Master vs. Demonic Toys was released to the Syfy Channel on December 18, 2004 and received a DVD release on January 17, 2005.

== Reception ==
The film critic, Scott Weinberg wrote a negative review for Puppet Master vs. Demonic Toys on DVD Talk, writing that it was "not funny, it's not scary, and it's certainly not a worthwhile way to spend 90 minutes of the time you're given on this planet." Dread Central covered the film in a retrospective of the Puppet Master series, writing that "This made for TV movie isn’t considered canon, but it is a vast improvement over The Legacy." Comicbook.com has also reviewed the movie, calling it "gleefully, self-consciously awful. It's amazing."

The director, Ted Nicolaou was critical of Puppet Master vs. Demonic Toys in a 2017 interview with Video Fugue as he felt that it was "kind of a big mistake, I think, in a lot of ways".

Reflecting on the film in an interview, original series creator Charles Band stated:

"Yes, the rights to puppet master were sold to Si-Fi simply for the money. I regret it deeply. At the time it seemed the right thing to do as we needed to get the funds, but it was a mistake. Thankfully we have a new partner involved in the studio, new films in the works, and one of the requirements is that I be involved in all future releases"
