= Puppet Master: Doktor Death =

- Release poster
- Directed by: Dave Parker
- Based on: Puppet Master by Charles Band; Kenneth J. Hall
- Produced by: Charles Band, Josh Apple, William Butler, Greg Lightner, Mikey Stice
- Starring: Jenny Boswell; Chad Patterson; Emily Sue Bengtson
- Edited by: Topher Hansson
- Music by: Richard Band, Jerry Smith
- Production company: Candy Bar
- Distributed by: Full Moon Features
- Release date: October 28, 2022 (United States)
- Running time: 59 minutes
- Country: United States
- Language: English

Puppet Master: Doktor Death is a 2022 American horror film directed by Dave Parker. It is the fourteenth installment of the Puppet Master franchise and the second spin-off film of the series following Blade: The Iron Cross. The film centers on the titular Doktor Death from the seventh film, Retro Puppet Master. It was released on October 28, 2022.

== Plot ==
A young medical student is trapped in a nightmare and must face off against a mysterious soul that inhabits an evil puppet.

== Cast ==
- Jenny Boswell as April
- Chad Patterson as Ryan
- Emily Sue Bengtson as Jennifer
- Erin Eva Butcher as Carmen
- Melissa Moore as Gladys
- Ashton Wolf as Dr. Lantmen
- Tari Lyn Bergoine as Dorothy
- Zach Zebrowski as Flynn
- Pakob Jarernpone as Warren
- Rick Montgomery Jr. as Rufus
- Madeleine Dee as Receptionist
- Bill D. Russell as Max
- John Capocci as Sydney Fine
- Laura Dennis as Rebecca
- Jesse Guilmette as Luther
- Stephen Blackehart as First Servant (archive footage)
- George Calin as Valentin (archive footage)
- Jack Donner as Afzel (archive footage)
- Vlad Dulea as Duval (archive footage)
- Greg Sestero as Andrè Toulon (archive footage)
- Sando Teodor as Latour (archive footage)

=== Puppets ===
- Doktor Death

== Production ==
The movie was filmed in Cleveland, Ohio, in August 2022.

== Reception ==
Bloody Disgusting said, “I was ready to permanently close the lid on Andre Toulon's box of killer puppets after Blade: The Iron Cross and Puppet Master's “Axis Trilogy,” but Puppet Master: Doktor Death is proof that the strings on these puppets may be longer than it initially seemed. Doktor Death is hardly a full-on franchise rejuvenation, but it at least instills some confidence in any future endeavors, which otherwise wasn't present before. The film even goes the extra mile to actually connect with the franchise's larger lore in a way that's satisfying, makes sense, and will mean something to the series’ hardcore fans. Puppet Master would be wise to follow in Doktor Death's tiny footsteps and even let Dave Parker take a crack at another film; perhaps one that focuses on Six-Shooter, Leech Woman, or any of the more atypical killer puppets.”

Nerdly gave the film a positive review, writing “Whilst I enjoyed my time with Puppet Master: Doktor Death I really did wish the film would’ve had a little more meat on its bones. The film runs a mere 59 minutes, which keeps things moving at a swift pace but didn't leave much time for world-building or deep characterisation – two things that, I think, could’ve pushed this particular franchise entry to the next level and given us something akin to the original trilogy. What DOES however, give Puppet Master: Doktor Death a real kudos (and edge above the later Puppet Master films) is the movie's epilogue, one that ties things back to Retro Puppet Master brilliantly and sets up another Retro Puppet Master/Doktor Death sequel perfectly.”
