= Doug Aarniokoski =

American television director and producer

- Born: Douglas Aarniokoski
- Other name: Arnold Cassius
- Occupations: Television director, television producer
- Years active: 1991–present

Douglas Aarniokoski is an American television director and producer.

He is well known for his work on the CBS series Star Trek: Discovery, Star Trek: Short Treks, Star Trek: Picard, Criminal Minds, S.W.A.T., and The CW superhero drama Arrow. He has also worked on FOX supernatural series Sleepy Hollow.

== Career ==
Aarniokoski got his start as a production assistant on Rambo 3. He continued as production assistant on Turner & Hooch and as a personal assistant to Tom Cruise on his 1990 film Days of Thunder. He then worked on the 1992 horror feature Doctor Mordrid, as the first assistant director. He went on to serve as assistant director on several other films such as From Dusk till Dawn, Living Out Loud, The Faculty, and Spy Kids.

Later he began serving as a second unit director for features such as The Medallion, Once Upon a Time in Mexico, and Resident Evil: Extinction.

His directorial debut was with the 2000 action film Highlander: Endgame. His other credits include Animals and The Day.

He co-wrote and directed the 2013 horror Nurse 3D.

Aarniokoski has directed 8 installments of the CBS series Criminal Minds since 2011, while directing two episodes of The CW's Green Arrow origin series Arrow and one of its sister-series, The Flash.

=== Sleepy Hollow ===
During the first season of the FOX series Sleepy Hollow, Aarniokoski directed the 7th episode, "The Midnight Ride". In winter 2014, he joined as supervising producer and main director on the show. He has since directed the second-season episodes "Go Where I Send Thee...", "And the Abyss Gazes Back", "Kali Yuga" and "Awakening".

=== Limitless ===
In 2015, he joined the new CBS series Limitless, as supervising producer and director. The show will be run by former Sleepy Hollow co-worker Mark Goffman.

== Filmography ==
Year	Title	Director	Writer	Notes
1993	Puppet Master 4	No	Yes	Direct-to-video
1994	Puppet Master 5: The Final Chapter	No	Yes	Direct-to-video
2000	Highlander: Endgame	Yes	No	
2009	Animals	Yes	No	Credited as "Arnold Cassius"
2011	The Day	Yes	No	
2014	Nurse 3D	Yes	Yes	

Acting roles

Year	Title	Role	Notes
1997	Austin Powers: International Man of Mystery	Dr. Evil's Telephone	Voice, Uncredited
1998	The Faculty	Brun Coach	
2000	Highlander: Endgame	Kirk	

=== Television ===
Year	Title	Notes
2011–2026	Criminal Minds	12 episodes
2013–2015	Sleepy Hollow	6 episodes
2013	Hungry	
2014–2015	Arrow	2 episodes
2015	The Flash	Episode: "Rogue Air"
2015–2016	Limitless	4 episodes
2016	American Gothic	Episode: "The Oxbow"
2016–2017	Bull	4 episodes
2017–2024	Star Trek: Discovery	5 episodes
2018	Timeless	Episode: "Mrs. Sherlock Holmes"
2018	Instinct	3 episodes
2018	Salvation	Episode: "White House Down"
2018	Star Trek: Short Treks	Episode: "The Brightest Star"
2018–2023	S.W.A.T.	5 episodes
2019–2024	Blue Bloods	10 episodes
2020	Charmed	Episode: "Curse Words"
2020–2023	Star Trek: Picard	5 episodes
2021	Clarice	2 episodes
2024	Tracker	2 episodes
2025	The Irrational	Episode: "Another Man's Treasure"
2025	Leverage: Redemption	Episode: "The Polygeist Job"
2026	Star Trek: Starfleet Academy	2 episodes
