= List of Puppet Master characters =

This is a list of characters from the Puppet Master series of films.

== André Toulon ==
André Toulon is the namesake of the Puppet Master series. Toulon appeared as a hero in Puppet Master III: Toulon's Revenge, and a victim in the beginning of the first film. After dying, Toulon was resurrected first as a villain in His Unholy Creation only and then as just another fighter inside a puppet-body. He is referenced throughout the movies, and is the greatest connection, besides the puppets themselves, the films have with each other. In Curse of the Puppet Master his name was only on a sign. In Puppet Master, parts of the legend of Toulon is that he committed suicide in 1939. But in Puppet Master 3 takes place in 1941, and he is still alive. Toulon is played by William Hickey in Puppet Master, by Steve Welles in Puppet Master II, by Guy Rolfe in Puppet Master III: Toulon's Revenge, Puppet Master 4 and Puppet Master 5: The Final Chapter. Rolfe and Greg Sestero played the character at different ages in the prequel Retro Puppet Master.

== Blade ==
Blade is the leader of the puppets, and is one of the few puppets, along with Pinhead, to appear in all of the Puppet Master movies to date. He is the only puppet to have appeared on all of the VHS, DVD and Blu-ray covers of the Puppet Master movies. He is 1'9", weighs 4 lbs, and has a gothic-styled appearance. He has a gaunt pale face with seemingly empty black eye sockets and long white hair and wears a black trench coat and wide-brimmed hat. It is revealed (in Puppet Master III: Toulon's Revenge) that Blade was created by André Toulon and modeled after Gestapo Major (Sturmbannführer) Krauss. He has the soul of Dr. Hess, a German scientist and medical doctor who wanted to work with Toulon. He was used for evil under puppet masters Neil Gallagher, André Toulon (in Puppet Master II) and Dr. Magrew, all three of whom he later turned against. He was used for good under André Toulon, Fritz Blackwood, Danny Coogan, Rick Meyers, Peter Hertz A.K.A. Eric Weiss, and Robert Toulon whom he each served loyally. Blade has a sharp hook for his left hand and a knife for his right hand. He sometimes has spike-shaped "bullet eyes" that pop out of his sockets.

Appears in all the Puppet Master films.

== Pinhead ==
Pinhead is 1'7" and weighs 2 lbs. Before he became a puppet, Pinhead was a man named Herman Strauss. Strauss was a truck driver who secretly brought food to the Jewish ghettos; as a result, he was killed by the Nazis for treason. His retro version was the soul of a beggar André Toulon knew. The Retro version was the first puppet Toulon (with the help of Afzel) brought to life (Retro Puppet Master). Pinhead was used for evil under puppet masters Neil Gallagher, André Toulon (Puppet Master II), and Dr. Magrew, all whom he turned against in the end. Pinhead's only power is his two big hands, which can deliver quite a punch. He is unnaturally strong, able to move or drag a full grown human body with ease. Pinhead got his name from the fact that his head is tinier that the rest of his body.

Appears in all the Puppet Master films.

== Leech Woman ==
Ms. Leech is 1 ft 7 in (0.48 m) and weighs 2 lbs. She began as a young Swiss girl named Ilsa. Ilsa's father was an unloving Swiss ambassador. One night in 1902, while she and her father were in Paris, Ilsa traveled to the Theater Magic where she met her future husband André Toulon. Later, she is kidnapped by the slaves of the demon lord, Sutekh, and is rescued by André and his first six puppets (Retro Puppet Master). Later in 1926, Ilsa (now named Elsa) and André go to Cairo, where André's (presumed 7th) living puppet, Mephisto, is burned to a crisp. An old merchant gives Toulon a new type of magic which Ilsa convinces André to learn from the merchant. In Berlin, Ilsa and André have four new puppets, Tunneler, Jester, Pinhead and Six-Shooter. Tunneler, Pinhead and Jester are based on their friends: Joseph Sebastion (Tunneler), an American Soldier who was captured and forced to work in the salt mines by the Nazis; Jester, a book-keeper named Hans Seiderman who the Toulons liked for his love of jokes and who was shot to death by the Nazis; and Pinhead, a kindhearted man called Herman Strauss who was killed for smuggling food into a work camp (Six-Shooter's identity was never revealed). Ilsa was murdered by Major Krauss when she tried to stop the Nazis from kidnapping André and the Puppets. André later went to a morgue with Pinhead and Jester, where they took the tissue from Ilsa's corpse. Back at their temporary camp, Andre injects the formula that he made from the tissue into the puppet of Ilsa he made for her, resurrecting her as a puppet. Toulon also fed a leech to the puppet, giving her its power. In Puppet Master II, André's zombie form has Blade, Leech Woman, and Torch go to gather material for a new batch of fluid. Leech Woman is captured by an overweight woman, named Martha, and thrown into her fireplace after she killed her husband. Torch then set fire to the woman, killing her, to avenge Leech Woman. Charles Band, however, mentioned that Leech Woman was saved and revived, but was not present in Puppet Master 4 or Puppet Master 5. Leech Woman's power is her ability to vomit poisonous leeches. In addition to her leeches, she wields a small knife. She is also the only female puppet before Bombshell and Comb Queen.

Appears in:

Puppet Master
Puppet Master II
Puppet Master III: Toulon's Revenge
Curse of the Puppet Master
Retro Puppet Master
Puppet Master: The Legacy (cameo appearance)
Puppet Master: Axis of Evil
Puppet Master X: Axis Rising
Puppet Master: Axis Termination

== Jester ==
Jester is a vintage typical court harlequinade. He is 1'8" and weighs one and a half pounds. In Puppet Master III: Toulon's Revenge it is revealed that before he became a puppet, Jester was a man named Hans Seiderman; a bookkeeper who loved to play pranks and tell jokes who was killed by the Nazis when his jokes went too far. He was used for evil under puppet masters Neil Gallagher, André Toulon (Puppet Master II), and Dr. Magrew, all whom he turned against in the end. Jester has the ability to rotate three portions of his face: his forehead, middle face, and chin. He can show five expressions: happy, devious, sad, angry or surprised, which also doubles as scared. He holds a scepter which can sometimes be used as a weapon. However, Jester is only seen with his scepter in Puppet Master vs Demonic Toys. Out of all the puppets, Jester has the most designs. In Puppet Master 1–5, Jester has red clothes, his sleeves are mixed in purple and black, in Part 1 and the beginning of Part 2 he does not wear a hat, except in a scene where he is behind a curtain, while every movie since he has worn a jester hat, the rest of Part 2, and 3–5, he had a purple hat. In Puppet Master 6–8, Jester is all red, mixed on his sleeves are red and blue, and he has a blue hat. In Puppet Master vs. Demonic Toys, Jester's hat is all orange with shades of red. He was given a mace-arm by Robert Toulon after a terrible fire in Puppet Master vs. Demonic Toys. In Puppet Master, the puppets turned on their master because he threw Jester, and in part II, the puppets tried to find the formula for the starving puppet. In Puppet Master 1–5, Jester serves as the watchman of the group; looking out for danger and keeping the enemy occupied long enough for the puppets to strike. Jester's most common companion is Pinhead in films III–V, and Blade in Curse of the Puppet Master and Puppet Master vs. Demonic Toys. Jester also spends time with Leech Woman. He is cared for by the other puppets. Jester can fit through small places where the other puppets cannot. He is also sometimes credited as the leader of the puppets, but he lets Blade act as leader.

Appears in all the Puppet Master films except Puppet Master: The Littlest Reich and Blade: The Iron Cross.

Trivia:

- Jester had never directly killed anyone on screen until he killed Sheriff Garvey along with the help of Blade in Curse of the Puppet Master.
- Jester is originally the Leader of the Toulon Puppet Army, before Blade and Decapitron.

== Tunneler ==
According to a trading card released by Fullmoon features, Tunneler's soul is Joseph Sebastein, a soldier who was forced to work in the Nazis' salt mines until he died. Tunneler's namesake and main weapon is a cone-shaped power drill replacing his scalp; he usually kills his victims by charging them head-on with his drill running.

Appears in all the Puppet Master films except Puppet Master vs. Demonic Toys.

Trivia:

- His retro counterpart "Drill Sargeant" was André's fellow puppeteer, Vigo Garrison.
- In the action figure, he has a machine gun and a pick axe, but he never used them in the movies.

== Torch ==
Torch was built in Puppet Master II by André Toulon. Torch later betrayed Toulon and set him on fire. Afterwards, he assisted Camille in "visiting" mentally ill children. He appeared in Puppet Master 5: The Final Chapter assisting Rick Meyers to defeat a demon. His fate and who he was in real life are currently unknown. Torch has a flamethrower for his right hand that is used to burn people alive. In Puppet Master: Axis of Evil, Torch's picture is seen as the credits roll. In the comics, it turns out that Torch used to be Toulon's own son. Who had betrayed his father, had joined the Hitler Youth, and was also given a flamethrower

Appears in:

Puppet Master II
Puppet Master 4 (Poster Appearance)
Puppet Master 5: The Final Chapter
Curse of the Puppet Master (Cameo Appearance)
Puppet Master: The Legacy (Cameo Appearance)
Puppet Master: The Littlest Reich (As Kaiser)

== Six-Shooter ==
Six-Shooter is a cowboy with six arms, each holding a gun. Other than his guns, he has a red bandanna that moves by itself. He is first shown in Puppet Master III: Toulon's Revenge. His skills include sharpshooting, roping and climbing walls like a spider. In Retro Puppet Master, it is revealed that in real life, the retro version of Six-Shooter was once the person who first taught Andre how to animate inanimate objects; the identity of the later Six-Shooter has not been revealed. In the behind the scenes of Retro Puppet Master, Six Shooter is seen as Guy Rolfe opens the puppet trunk. In Puppet Master vs. Demonic Toys, Six-Shooter is given laser-shooters in replacement for his guns as a result of a fire that had happened previously. In Puppet Master: Axis of Evil, Six Shooter's arms makes a cameo in the movie, and his picture is seen also in the movie along with Torch as the credits roll. In Puppet Master X: Axis Rising and Puppet Master: Axis Termination, Six-Shooter's attire switches his brown jacket for a black jacket with a matching bandana.

Appears in:

Puppet Master III: Toulon's Revenge
Puppet Master 4
Puppet Master 5
Curse of the Puppet Master
Retro Puppet Master (Behind The Scenes)
Puppet Master: The Legacy
Puppet Master vs. Demonic Toys
Puppet Master: Axis of Evil (Arms Only)
Puppet Master X: Axis Rising
Puppet Master: Axis Termination

== Decapitron ==
Decapitron is one of the puppets featured near the end of both Puppet Master 4 and 5. Its appearance is modeled after André Toulon's outfit from Puppet Master III: Toulon's Revenge. It wears a brown jacket with a black undershirt, a black belt, and black gloves. Its regular head has indented eyes and nose, and the base of its head seems to resemble the base of a light bulb. Its name seems to reflect the fact he has interchangeable heads, when taking them off would make him decapitate himself. Not much is known about Decapitron's background, other than the fact he was an unfinished puppet André Toulon worked on while he was alive. Decapitron's height and weight are also not revealed in the films as well. Decapitron has the soul of André Toulon, the namesake and creator of the puppets in the "Puppet Master" franchise. Unlike the other puppet creations of André Toulon's, Decapitron cannot be activated by having the formula injected directly through a needle. Rather, it has to be activated by the formula combined with an electric current.

Appears in:

Puppet Master 4
Puppet Master 5: The Final Chapter
Puppet Master: The Legacy (cameo appearance)

== Inanimate puppets ==
- Adolf Hitler Puppet
- Clippo the Clown
- Faust and his wife
- Little Red Riding Hood
- Mr. Punch (Cameo)
- Gengie (Indian Puppet)
- Dummy
- Pulse Pounders Puppet
- Sailor Puppet
- Teto the Clown
- Freuhoffer's Other Puppets

== Other puppets ==
- Kahn
- Tank
- Mephisto
- Gypsy
- Matt
- Ninja
- Djinn the Homunculus
- Comb Queen
- Happy Amphibian
- Drac
- The Mortician (Action Figure Only)
- Unnamed female skeletal puppet (Possessing the soul of Madam Adon)
- Pajama Boy (Action Lab Comics Only)

== Nazi puppets ==
- Blitzkrieg
- Bombshell
- Weremacht
- Kamikaze

== Retro–Puppets ==
- Cyclops
- Dr. Death
- Retro-Blade
- Retro-Pinhead
- Drill Sergeant (Originally known as Retro-Tunneler)
- Retro-6-Shooter

== Human characters ==
=== Introduced in Puppet Master ===
- André Toulon
- Alex Whitaker
- Dana Hadley
- Carissa Stamford
- Frank Forrester
- Neil Gallagher
- Megan Gallagher
- Theresa

=== Introduced in Puppet Master II ===
- Carolyn Bramwell – The leader of the parapsychologist group sent to investigate Megan Gallagher's death
- Patrick Bramwell – Carolyn's brother and fellow investigator, killed early on in the film by Tunneler
- Camille Kenney
- Michael Kenney
- Wanda
- Lance
- Martha
- Mathew
- Elsa Toulon

=== Introduced in later films ===
- Rick Myers
- Cameron Phillips
- Dr. Magrew
- Jane Magrew
- Robert Winsley
- Billy
- Dr. Hess
- Robert K. Toulon
- Alexandra Toulon
- Peter Hertz / Eric Weiss
- Suzie
- Lauren
- Dr. Carl Baker
- Dr. Leslie Piper
- Tom Hendy
- Jason
- Scott
- Art Cooney
- Afzel
- Sergeant Jessica Russell
- Julian
- Christina
- Claudia
- Danny Coogan
- Beth
- Uncle Len
- Don Coogan
- Elma Coogan
- Duval
- Valentin
- Latour
- Vigo
- Captain Brooks
- Georgina Vale
- Sturmbahnfurher Krabke
- Doktor Gerde Ernst
- Dr. Ivan (character from Decadent Evil, Decadent Evil II and Ravenwolf Towers)
- Elisa Ivanov (daughter of Dr. Ivan)
- Oberhelfer Friede Steitze
- Antoinette Longpre
- General Kip Hansard

== Villainous characters ==
- Sutekh
- Mummy Servants
- Totems
- Neil Gallagher
- Joey Carp
- Major Krauss
- Lieutenant Stein
- General Mueller
- Dr. Lawrence Jennings
- Sheriff Garvey
- Deputy Wayburn
- Maclain
- Erica Sharpe
- Ozu
- Max
- Klaus
- Zombie André Toulon
