= Puppet Master 4 =

- Theatrical release poster
- Directed by: Jeff Burr
- Written by: Charles Band; Steven E. Carr; Todd Henschell; Keith S. Payson; Jo Duffy; Douglas Aarniokoski
- Produced by: Charles Band
- Starring: Gordon Currie; Chandra West; Jason Adams; Teresa Hill; Felton Perry; Stacie Randall; Guy Rolfe
- Cinematography: Adolfo Bartoli
- Edited by: Mark S. Manos; Margaret-Anne Smith
- Music by: Richard Band
- Production company: Full Moon Entertainment
- Distributed by: Paramount Home Video
- Release date: November 24, 1993
- Running time: 79 minutes
- Country: United States
- Language: English

Puppet Master 4 (also known as Puppet Master 4: The Demon) is a 1993 direct-to-video horror film written by Charles Band among others, and directed by Jeff Burr. It is the fourth film in the Puppet Master franchise and stars Gordon Currie as a young prodigy who, along with his friends, played by Chandra West, Jason Adams and Teresa Hill, are attacked by demons; the animated puppets of André Toulon (Guy Rolfe) serve to protect the group, similar to the role they played in the prequel Toulon's Revenge, rather than terrorize, as they had in the first and second films.

Puppet Master 4, as well as the second, third, and fifth installments, were only available in DVD format through a Full Moon Features box set that has since been discontinued. However, in 2007, Full Moon reacquired the rights to the first five films, and the boxset has since been reissued and is available directly from the studio, as well as through several online retailers.

== Plot ==
In the underworld of Hell, a demon lord named Sutekh sends forth a trio of diminutive servants called the Totems, magically controlled by his netherworld minions, to kill those who possess the secret of animation, including the magic André Toulon used to give his puppets life. It transpires also that a team of researchers working on the development of artificial intelligence are close to discovering Toulon's secret. Sutekh sends one of the Totems as a package to two of the researchers involved, Dr. Piper and Dr. Baker of the Phoenix Division, who are taken by surprise, killed and stripped of their souls by the foul creature.

One of the researchers, a talented young man named Rick Myers, is working as a caretaker at the Bodega Bay Inn and has also been using it for a place to conduct his experiments on the A.I. project. The same night Drs. Piper and Baker are murdered, Rick's friends Suzie, Lauren, and Cameron come to visit him. At dinner, Lauren, who is a psychic, finds Blade (who had been discovered earlier by Rick inside the house and is still animate) and then Toulon's old trunk, with the puppets, Toulons diary and some vials with the life-giving formula inside. Out of curiosity, Rick and his friends use the fluid on the puppets, and one by one they awaken; next to Blade, they find Pinhead, Six Shooter, Tunneler and Jester. (Torch, who joins the puppet cast in the sequel, makes no appearance here.)

Fascinated by the puppets' spontaneous reactions, and believing that the formula is the answer to the running AI projects, Rick wants to see how smart they are by playing a laser tag game with Pinhead and Tunneler. Cameron, who is competing with Rick for success, tries to use the formula's secret for his personal gain, and he and Lauren decide to use a strange gameboard found in the trunk to try and contact Toulon for its exact composition, whose recipe was not recorded in the diary. But the glowing pyramid icon which goes with the board is a conduit between the mortal world and the underworld; Sutekh uses the link to send two of his Totems to attack. Cameron and Lauren attempt to flee by car, but Cameron is ambushed by one of the Totems inside his car and killed, while Lauren manages to get back into the hotel. When Rick goes after Cameron, the Totem attacks him as well, but he manages to escape.

Back inside the inn, the third Totem, sent in earlier by package, is also on the prowl. The puppets, intent on protecting Rick, search the hotel and soon manage to kill one of the Totems in the kitchen and, through its supervision link, its controller in the underworld. Then Toulon's spirit, who has been appearing around the hotel all night, tells the puppets to animate the Decapitron. Under Rick and Suzie's astonished eyes, the puppets move up to Rick's room, retrieve a box which contains yet another puppet with a soft plastic head, and revive it with the formula and a lightning strike. The two remaining Totems attack to disrupt the process, but one is electrocuted when Six Shooter uses a wire as a lariat to divert some of the lightning's power into it. Decapitron briefly awakens, and his head morphs into the likeness of Toulon, who explains to Rick the origin and the secret of the life-giving formula. The vial, however, turns out to be missing; immediately suspecting Cameron, Rick goes back to search his body, where he does indeed find the vial.

Meanwhile, the last Totem corners the panicked Lauren and prepares to drain her life away when Suzie interferes and douses it with acid. Toulon speaks through Lauren, urging Rick to animate Decapitron to destroy the Totem, and Rick uses his computer to divert power from his generator into Decapitron, bringing him to life. As the Totem attacks, Decapitron exchanges his plastic head for an electron-bolt launching system and destroys the creature. Afterwards, Toulon speaks to Rick yet again, surrendering custody of his puppets and the formula to him and promising his help in times of need.

== Cast ==
- Guy Rolfe as André Toulon
- Gordon Currie as Rick Myers
- Chandra West as Susie
- Ash Adams as Cameron Phillips (credited as "Jason Adams")
- Teresa Hill as Lauren
- Felton Perry as Dr. Carl Baker
- Stacie Randall as Dr. Leslie Piper
- Michael Shamus Wiles as Stanley
- Dan Zukovic as Delivery Man
- Jake McKinnon as Sutekh (uncredited)

=== Featured puppets ===
- Blade
- Pinhead
- Jester
- Tunneler
- Six-Shooter (voiced by Albert Band)
- Decapitron
- Totem
- Torch (Poster only)
- Mephisto (Toulon poster only)

== Production ==
=== Development ===
In 1992, executive producer Charles Band announced an upcoming film in the Puppet Master series, titled Puppet Master 4, despite not having a script for said film. The film was to be a crossover with the Demonic Toys series, with the puppets, depicted as protagonists, battling the toys, set for release in the fall of 1992. The project never materialized, and Demonic Toys instead crossed over with Dollman in Dollman vs. Demonic Toys in 1993. Band decided to that the film would be a theatrical feature rather than a direct-to-video release, naming it Puppet Master: The Movie. The script was co-written by Band, Steven E. Carr, Todd Henschell, Keith S. Payson, Jo Duffy, and Douglas Aarniokoski, and later split into two films, Puppet Master 4 and Puppet Master 5: The Final Chapter. Jeff Burr was hired to direct the film; Burr had watched the first two Puppet Master films and visited the set of Puppet Master III: Toulon's Revenge.

=== Filming ===
Puppet Master 4 and Puppet Master 5 were shot back-to-back in Culver City and Pasadena in California in February 1993. The two films had very little pre-production due to a tight schedule. The set for Hell was designed by Milo Needles.

=== Casting ===
Actors and actresses cast for the films included Gordon Currie, Chandra West, Ash Adams, Teresa Hill, Felton Perry, Guy Rolfe, Michael Shamus Wiles, Dan Zukovic, and Jake McKinnon. When Rolfe arrived on set, he refused to leave his hotel room and participate in the film. Band paid him the entire amount of his paycheck in cash for his role as André Toulon by sliding it under the door. Hill was given the chance to appear in a Doritos commercial during production, but was not allowed to take a break between filming due to the limited production schedule. Joanna Pettet, Judy Geeson and Camilla Sparv were considered for the role of Dr, Leslie Piper, but Stacie Randall was cast instead. The laughter of the puppet Six-Shooter was provided by Charles Band's father Albert Band.

=== Special effects ===
The puppet effects and stop motion animation were supervised by David W. Allen, coordinated by Chris Endicott, and done by themselves, Randall Cook, Connie Angland, Anthony Allen Barlow, Joseph Grossberg, Jurgen Heimann, David Miner Jr., Mark Rappaport, Kirk Skodis, Holly Speriglio, Scott Woodard, and Brett B. White at David Allen Productions. Dennis Gordon's original designs for the Totems were intended to resemble tribal warriors. Sutekh and the Totems used the same puppet. The puppet Decapitron was originally a life-sized robot character for an unmade screenplay titled Decapitron, written by Danny Bilson and Paul De Meo and directed by Peter Manoogian. It was to be Empire International Pictures's highest budgeted film and planned for release in 1989, but was canceled due to the company's closure in 1988. The effect for Decapitron's head morphing into André Toulon's was achieved with computer animation and by filming Guy Rolfe against a blue screen. Torch, who appeared in Puppet Master II, was left out of the film due to economic reasons, as the filmmakers could only afford to use the puppet's fire effects and a fire marshal for one installment. Despite this, Torch still appears on the poster and the film's covers, and would reappear in Puppet Master 5.

The makeup effects were done by Wayne Toth, Christl Colven, Michael Deak, and Palah Sandling at Alchemy FX. Toth stated that the script vaguely described Sutekh as "the king of the fourth dimension who controls the secrets of the puppets". He decided to come up with a design that "looked kind of evil and royal-looking", and made the character tall. Sutekh's design was made out of several different materials, such as foam latex for the head and hands. Stunts were coordinated by Tim A. Davison.

== Reception ==
Screen Rant ranked Puppet Master 4 as "a little more past the halfway point between perfect and awful", calling it "more confusing than the already convoluted chronology of the entire series". Billboard magazine pointed out that while "[depicting] the once-fearsome puppets as good guys" made them less frightening, "the artfully designed remain uncannily creepy".

== Bibliography ==
- Brehmer, Nat (September 27, 2021). Puppet Master Complete: A Franchise History. McFarland Publishing. ISBN 978-1-476-67630-2.
