= Richard Band =

American composer of film music

- Born: Richard Howard Band; Los Angeles, California, USA
- Genre: Film score
- Occupations: Composer
- Instruments: Guitar, synthesizer
- Years active: 1978–present
- Spouse: Marilynn Band
- Website: richardbandmusic.com

Richard Howard Band is an American composer of film music. He has scored more than 140 projects, including From Beyond, which won the award for Best Original Soundtrack at the Sitges Film Festival. Lately he scored Exorcism at 60,000 Feet (2020) and Necropolis: Legion (2019).

== Life and career ==
Band was born in Los Angeles, California. He is the son of the film director/producer Albert Band, the brother of director/distributor Charles Band, and the uncle of musician Alex Band.

Band has been composing film music for horror and science fiction films regularly. His first notable score was for Laserblast, which he co-composed with Joel Goldsmith.

His score for Stuart Gordon's Re-Animator was lauded by the magazine Music From the Movies, which said, "Band’s music is dark and direct, creating an intense and eerie atmosphere, but always with a humorous touch.... Surely, Richard Band is unquestionably one of the most underrated composers in the film business."

He scored several of Gordon's subsequent films such as The Pit and the Pendulum and 1995's Castle Freak, the latter featured some inventive writing for a string quartet. He was nominated for an Emmy Award for Gordon's Masters of Horror episode "Dreams in the Witch House".

Since 2000, Band has done fewer films, though he has scored many episodes of such television shows as Stargate SG-1, Walker: Texas Ranger. He also developed the campaign music for many shows on the WB, such as Buffy the Vampire Slayer and Smallville.

== Works ==
- Scalper (2023)
- The Old Ones (2023)
- The Primevals (2023)
- Puppet Master: Doktor Death (2022)
- Night Caller (2021)
- Don't Let Her In (2021)
- The Resonator: Miskatonic U (2021)
- The Deep Ones (2020)
- Blade the Iron Cross (2020)
- Exorcism at 60,000 Feet (2020)
- Bunker of Blood: Chapter 8: Butcher's Bake Off: Hell's Kitchen (2019)
- Necropolis: Legion (2019)
- Bull Mountain Lookout (2018) (short)
- Bunker of Blood: Chapter 6: Zombie Lust: Night Flesh (2018) (video)
- Bunker of Blood: Chapter 5: Psycho Sideshow: Demon Freaks (2018) (video)
- Mingua, o Gato Mau (2018) (video)
- Nightmare Cinema (segments "Dead", "Mirari") (2018)
- Puppet Master: The Littlest Reich (2018)
- Ravenwolf Tower (2016)
- Ice Cream (2015)
- Trophy Heads (2014)
- Throwback (2014)
- Unlucky Charms (2013)
- Ooga Booga (2013)
- Puppet Master X: Axis Rising (2012)
- Shiver (2012)
- Eyes Only (2011)
- Evil Bong 3-D: The Wrath of Bong (2011)
- Puppet Master: Axis of Evil (2010)
- Last Remaining Light (2010)
- Angels (2009)
- Safe Haven: The Warsaw Zoo (2009)
- Fortune Teller (2008)
- The Raven (2007)
- Masters of Horror: The Washingtonians (2007)
- Nympha (2007)
- Masters of Horror: Valerie on the Stairs (2006)
- Masters of Horror: Dreams in the Witch-House (2005)
- Beyond Re-Animator (2003)
- Puppet Master: The Legacy (2003)
- The Silvergleam Whistle (2003)
- My Horrible Year (2001)
- Planescape: Torment (1999)
- Curse of the Puppet Master (1998)
- Stargate SG-1 (1998)
- Three (1998)
- Hideous! (1997)
- In the Doghouse (1998)
- Bugs (1996)
- Head of the Family (1996)
- Robo Warriors (1996)
- Shadow of the Knight (1996)
- Zarkorr! The Invader (1996)
- Castle Freak (1995)
- Dragonworld (1995)
- Magic Island (1995)
- Time Warrior: Planet of the Dino-Knights (1995)
- Time Warrior: Journey to the Magic Cavern (1995)
- Time Warrior: The Human Pets (1995)
- Time Warrior: Trapped on Toy World (1995)
- Castles (1994)
- Puppet Master 5: The Final Chapter (1994)
- Shrunken Heads (1994)
- Dollman vs. Demonic Toys (1993]
- Prehysteria! (1993)
- Puppet Master 4 (1993)
- Remote (1993)
- Demonic Toys (1992)
- Doctor Mordrid (1992)
- The Resurrected (1992)
- Seed People (1992)
- Trancers III (1992)
- Arena (1991)
- Trancers II (1991)
- The Pit and the Pendulum (1991)
- Puppet Master III: Toulon's Revenge (1991)
- Silent Night, Deadly Night 4: Initiation (1990)
- Bride of Re-Animator (1990)
- The Arrival (1990)
- Crash and Burn (1990)
- Puppet Master II (1990)
- Shadowzone (1990)
- The Caller (1989)
- Arena (1989)
- Puppet Master (1989)
- Prison (1988)
- Eliminators (1986)
- From Beyond (1986)
- Ghostwarrior (1986)
- TerrorVision (1986)
- Troll (1986)
- Zone Troopers (1986)
- The Dungeonmaster (1985)
- Ghoulies (1985)
- Re-Animator (1985)
- Mutant (1984)
- The House on Sorority Row (1983)
- Metalstorm: The Destruction of Jared-Syn (1983)
- Parasite (1982)
- Time Walker (1982)
- Dr. Heckyl and Mr. Hype (1980)
- The Day Time Ended (1980)
- Laserblast (1978)
- Auditions (1978)
