= Puppet Master: Axis of Evil =

- Release poster
- Directed by: David DeCoteau
- Written by: Charles Band; August White
- Produced by: Charles Band
- Starring: Levi Fiehler; Jenna Gallaher; Taylor M. Graham; Tom Sandoval; Jerry Hoffman; Erica Shaffer; Ada Zhou Fang
- Cinematography: Terrance Ryker
- Edited by: Danny Draven
- Music by: Richard Band
- Distributed by: Full Moon Features
- Release date: July 27, 2010
- Running time: 83 minutes
- Country: United States
- Language: English

Puppet Master: Axis of Evil is a 2010 American action horror film directed by David DeCoteau, it is the ninth installment of the Puppet Master series of horror films. and the first in the Axis trilogy.

== Plot ==
At the Bodega Bay Inn, Danny Coogan is making wooden chairs for a wedding reception for his Uncle Len, who owns the hotel. Danny tells his uncle that if it was not for his limp, he would be able to go to war, along with his brother Don, and tells his Uncle that he's going to help André Toulon. Toulon is a guest at the hotel, whose wife was killed by the Nazis because they wanted a formula, a formula that allows his puppets to come alive. After escaping from Berlin to Geneva, Toulon came to America to hide from the Nazis. As Danny's heading over to Toulon's room, he hears a gunshot and goes to see what happened. Two men dressed in black leaving Toulon's room push Danny aside, and as they leave, he manages to get a glimpse at one of their faces. He enters the room and finds Toulon dead with a gun in his hand. Danny, to whom Toulon showed his puppets, grabs them out of a wall panel and finds that all the puppets are still there, along with an unanimated Six Shooter and another puppet, named Ninja.

The next day, Danny goes to visit his mother, Elma and his brother Don. Don is being shipped off to war the following week. Meanwhile, the two Nazi assassins, Klaus and Max, are heading to an Opera House in Chinatown, under orders from The Führer, where they meet a Japanese saboteur named Ozu. She tells them that she's under orders from The Emperor, which are for her and the Nazis to work together to take out an American bomb manufacturing plant, destroying America's war efforts. To obtain this goal, it requires Max to go undercover and pretend to be of American descent and work at the plant, and to get close to the girl who runs the plant's office, Beth, who is coincidentally Danny's girlfriend. The next day, after bringing the puppets to life, Danny walks into the plant to show them to Beth, and sees Max there. Recognizing him as one of the assassins, he tries to warn Beth away from him, but she doesn't believe him.

After Max leaves the plant, Danny follows him back to the Opera House, and uncovers their plan. Danny is seen by Max, and quickly leaves. Max calls the Bodega Bay Inn to find out where he lives and sends Klaus to Danny's mother's place where Elma and Beth are planning a bon voyage party for Don. Klaus shoots Elma, and kidnaps Beth, and also shoots Don when he unexpectedly comes home. Danny comes home to find Don bleeding to death, and after telling him what happened, thanks to Toulon's diary, puts his brother's soul into Ninja's body. Danny and the puppets head out to the opera house to get Beth. Tunneler and Leech Woman kill Ozu's men and Ninja and Pinhead kill Klaus. Danny saves Beth, but Ozu badly hurts Ninja, so Danny and Blade threaten Ozu with the active bomb to back off, which is taken by Max and deactivated. Ninja, with what little life he has left, stabs Ozu's sword into Max's back, killing him. Ozu takes off with Tunneler, and supposedly Jester and Leech Woman, inside the bag, leaving behind Blade, Pinhead, and the mortally wounded Ninja. Danny swears that Ozu has a war coming to her.

== Cast ==
- Levi Fiehler as Danny Coogan
- Jenna Gallaher as Beth
- Taylor M. Graham as Don Coogan
- Tom Sandoval as Ben / Max
- Jerry Hoffman as Uncle Len
- Erica Shaffer as Elma Coogan
- Aaron Riber as Klaus
- Ada Chao as Ozu
- Gu Yingfeng as Nozoki-Ya
- Xiangfu Zhang as Buta
- Mike Brooks as Mr. Gifford
- William Hickey as André Toulon (archive footage and uncredited)

=== Puppets ===
- Blade
- Pinhead
- Leech Woman
- Jester
- Tunneler
- Torch (End Credits Only)
- Six-Shooter (Arms and End Credits Only)
- Ninja (New Puppet)
- Shredder Khan
- Gengie

== Production ==
Following Puppet Master: The Legacy in 2003, Full Moon Pictures sold the rights for a Puppet Master and Demonic Toys crossover film to the Sci-Fi channel as the studio had become financially unable to make it themselves. As a result, Full Moon lost creative control, with Puppet Master vs Demonic Toys handled entirely by Sci-Fi.

Initially, Sci-Fi had envisioned the film as the pilot for a tv series; however, they were unable to do this, as series creator Charles Band had made sure with the contract that he would retain the rights to both franchises, later clarifying in an interview that Sci-Fi had only been given the license for one film.

In August 2008, a sequel to the main series, titled Puppet Master: Axis of Evil was announced as the beginning of a trilogy of films set during WWII. The film was shot alongside Killjoy 3 at Ace Studios, located in the Nanhai District of Foshan, Guangdong, China.

== Release ==
Puppet Master: Axis of Evil was released on July 27, 2010, Upon its release, Full Moon also released Puppet Master: Axis of Evil in a collector's set with the original Puppet Master in its original widescreen format on June 15. The set includes packaging resembling Toulon's trunk, a poster for Axis of Evil, mini-poster cards for all of the films in the series, and stickers featuring each puppet. The set is available on DVD and Blu-ray, marking Full Moon's first foray into the Blu-ray market, including both the original Puppet Master and Axis of Evil.
