= Puppet Master 5: The Final Chapter =

Puppet Master 5
- Theatrical release poster
- Directed by: Jeff Burr
- Written by: Charles Band; Steven E. Carr; Todd Henschell; Keith S. Payson; Jo Duffy; Douglas Aarniokoski
- Produced by: Charles Band; Keith S. Payson
- Starring: Guy Rolfe; Gordon Currie; Chandra West; Ian Ogilvy; Teresa Hill
- Cinematography: Adolfo Bartoli
- Edited by: Margeret-Anne Smith
- Music by: Richard Band
- Production company: Full Moon Entertainment
- Distributed by: Paramount Home Video
- Release date: September 21, 1994
- Running time: 81 minutes
- Country: United States
- Language: English

Puppet Master 5: The Final Chapter is a 1994 direct-to-video horror film written by Steven E. Carr among others, and directed by Jeff Burr. As its title suggests, this fifth film in the Puppet Master franchise was originally intended to conclude the series; however, it was followed by at least ten other films.

It was the sequel to 1993's Puppet Master 4, and stars Gordon Currie as the series' third Puppet Master, and Ian Ogilvy, his colleague, whose attempts to salvage the animated puppets of André Toulon (Guy Rolfe) from the Bodega Bay Inn are foiled by a demon.

As in the previous film, the puppets serve as protagonists, rather than terrorize as they had in the first and second films. In 1998, a sixth installment, Curse of the Puppet Master, was released, and the franchise has been ongoing since.

== Plot ==
Following the events of the previous film, Rick Myers has been arrested under the suspicion of having caused the murders of Dr. Piper and Baker, but Dr. Jennings, the new director of the Artificial Intelligence research project and Rick's temporary superior, gets him out on bail. Blade has been confiscated, but he escapes from the police department's evidence room and jumps into Susie's purse as she comes to fetch Rick. Lauren lies comatose in the hospital following the events in the hotel. Meanwhile, in the underworld, Sutekh decides to take matters into his own hands and infuses his life essence into his own Totem figure.

While Jennings professes scepticism toward Rick's story, he becomes actually quite interested in acquiring Toulon's secret, especially since the project's unofficial sponsors are luring with a sizeable contribution, should he succeed in presenting a prototype soon. Jennings returns to the Bodega Bay Inn with three hired thugs - Tom Hendy, Jason, and Scott - to collect the puppets and the formula, but in the meantime Rick is roused by a nightmare and finds Blade by his side. Sensing that something is about to happen, Rick and Blade depart for the hotel. Susie, while paying a visit to Lauren, witnesses her friend receiving a vision of Sutekh and his Totem. Unable to contact Rick, she proceeds to the hotel as well.

While searching the building, Jason and Hendy are ambushed and killed by Sutekh, and Scott encounters and is knocked out by Pinhead and Jester. Jennings also encounters Sutekh but is saved by Torch and Six-Shooter. The puppets then start fighting back against Sutekh. Rick goes back to his room and runs into Suzie, but they both get locked in by Sutekh's powers. Through his computer, Rick gets in contact with Lauren, who tells him to activate The Decapitron. Jennings enters the room and tries to convince Rick to collect the puppets and leave the hotel. In the meantime, Scott recovers, but is also found and slain by Sutekh.

Jester enters the room and leads Rick to where the Decapitron is hidden. Rick, Suzie and Jennings proceed to revive Decapitron, and Toulon advises them to leave the hotel while the puppets will engage Sutekh. Jennings, however, insists on taking one of the puppets with him, despite Rick and Suzie's warnings. Rick, Suzie, and Jennings take the elevator down, but then Jennings attacks and knocks out Rick, while Suzie is pushed out of the cabin. But when Jennings exits the elevator, he is stopped by Decapitron and the other puppets, who force him back to the elevator shaft. With the cabin already gone and the door secretly opened by Pinhead, Jennings falls to his death.

Sutekh corners Rick and Suzie, but Decapitron shows up, allowing them to escape. The puppets engage Sutekh, who fights back; but having stayed too long in the mortal world, the demon's essence has become vulnerable, and his power wanes. In desperation, Sutekh attempts to escape back into the underworld by opening a portal, but Decapitron fires electron bolts at it, overloading the conduit and causing it to explode, destroying Sutekh.

Rick takes the puppets back home to repair and care for them. Toulon speaks with Rick one final time, again entrusting his puppets and their secret to him while they will continue to act as his protectors.

== Cast ==
- Guy Rolfe as André Toulon
- Gordon Currie as Rick Myers
- Chandra West as Susie
- Ian Ogilvy as Jennings
- Teresa Hill as Lauren
- Nicholas Guest as Tom Hendy
- Willard E. Pugh (credited as "Willard Pugh") as Jason
- Diane McBain as Attorney
- Duane Whitaker as Scott
- Kaz Garas as Man #2
- Clu Gulager as Man #1
- Ron O'Neal as Detective
- Ash Adams (archive footage, credited as "Jason Adams") as Cameron Phillips
- Jake McKinnon (uncredited) as Sutekh

=== Featured puppets ===
- Blade
- Pinhead
- Jester
- Tunneler
- Torch
- Six-Shooter (voiced by Albert Band, uncredited)
- Decapitron
- Dark Totem

== Production ==
=== Development ===
In 1992, executive producer Charles Band announced an upcoming film in the Puppet Master series, titled Puppet Master 4, despite not having a script for said film. The film was to be a crossover with the Demonic Toys series, with the puppets, depicted as protagonists, battling the toys, set for release in the fall of 1992. The project never materialized, and Demonic Toys instead crossed over with Dollman in Dollman vs. Demonic Toys in 1993. Band decided to that the film would be a theatrical feature rather than a direct-to-video release, naming it Puppet Master: The Movie. The script was co-written by Band, Steven E. Carr, Todd Henschell, Keith S. Payson, Jo Duffy, and Douglas Aarniokoski, and later split into two films, Puppet Master 4 and Puppet Master 5. Jeff Burr was hired to direct the film; Burr had watched the first two Puppet Master films and visited the set of Puppet Master III: Toulon's Revenge.

=== Filming ===
Puppet Master 4 and Puppet Master 5 were shot back-to-back in Culver City and Pasadena in California in February 1993. The two films had very little pre-production due to a tight schedule. The Bodega Bay Inn's lobby was recreated as a set at Full Moon.

=== Casting ===
Actors and actresses cast for the films included Gordon Currie, Chandra West, Ian Ogilvy, Teresa Hill, Guy Rolfe, Nicholas Guest, Diane McBain, Duane Whitaker, Kaz Garas, Clu Gulager, and Ron O'Neal. Willard E. Pugh shaved his head for the role of Jason. He, Whitaker and Guest ad-libbed most of their lines. McBain was shocked upon seeing the craft service and free lunch provided for the cast and crew, and claimed to have gotten projectile diarrhea after eating said meal. The laughter of the puppet Six-Shooter was provided by Charles Band's father Albert Band.

=== Special effects ===
The puppet effects and stop motion animation were supervised by David W. Allen, coordinated by Chris Endicott and Joseph Grossberg, and done by themselves, Joel Fletcher, Paul Jessel, Connie Angland, Anthony Allen Barlow, Jurgen Heimann, David Miner Jr., Kevin O'Hara, Mark Rappaport, Kirk Skodis, Holly Speriglio, Scott Woodard, and Brett B. White at David Allen Productions. Burr stated that he wanted to give the puppets more human characteristics and "direct" them in a manner similar to human actors. The puppets were shot in a second unit instead of with the actors. Rappaport stated that the Totem was "the most complicated puppet [he and his team had] built yet". The puppet was made from plastic and operated with cables. Blade's body was a re-designed version of Tunneler's autopsy body from Puppet Master II. The makeup effects were done by Wayne Toth, Christl Colven, Michael Deak, and Palah Sandling at Alchemy FX. Stunts were coordinated by Tim A. Davison.

== Reception ==
On Rotten Tomatoes, the film holds an approval rating of 0% based on three reviews, with a weighted average rating of 3.1/10. Author John Kenneth Muir gave the film one star, stating, "Unfortunately, this entry, filmed back to back with Puppet Master 4: The Demon, continues the downward trajectory of the direct-to-video franchise. A repeat story, lackluster human characters, and a lengthy re-cap all contribute to a feeling that the franchise has run out of creative juice, not to mention money." Screen Rant ranked Puppet Master 5 5.1, calling it "nowhere near close to being the final movie".

== Bibliography ==
- Brehmer, Nat (September 27, 2021). Puppet Master Complete: A Franchise History. McFarland Publishing. ISBN 978-1-476-67630-2.
