= Retro Puppet Master =

- Theatrical release poster
- Directed by: David DeCoteau
- Written by: Charles Band; Benjamin Carr; David Schmoeller
- Produced by: Charles Band; Kirk Edward Hansen; Vlad Paunescu; Dana Scanlan; Mona C. Vasiloiu
- Starring: Greg Sestero; Brigitta Dau; Jack Donner; Stephen Blackehart; Guy Rolfe
- Cinematography: Viorel Sergovici
- Edited by: Don Adams
- Music by: John Massari
- Production company: The Kushner-Locke Company
- Distributed by: The Kushner-Locke Company; Full Moon Pictures
- Release date: November 9, 1999
- Running time: 90 minutes
- Country: United States
- Language: English

Retro Puppet Master (also known as Retro Puppetmaster) is a 1999 American direct-to-video horror film written by Charles Band, Benjamin Carr and David Schmoeller, and directed by David DeCoteau (as Joseph Tennent). It is the seventh film in the Puppet Master franchise, a prequel to 1991's Toulon's Revenge, and stars Greg Sestero as a young André Toulon, Jack Donner as an Egyptian sorcerer responsible for teaching Toulon how to animate his puppets, and Stephen Blackehart, Robert Radoveanu and Vitalie Bantas as demons who pursue Toulon for his magic.

While Retro serves to explain how Toulon began practicing the spell which animates his puppets, it ignores what was originally established in the second film as exactly how he learned the spell of animation. The film was also Guy Rolfe's final appearance as Toulon, save for flashback footage in The Legacy.

A spin-off based on the Dr. Death puppet from the movie was released in 2022, titled Puppet Master: Doktor Death.

== Plot ==
The film begins in 1944, Switzerland, taking place after the events of Puppet Master III: Toulon's Revenge. Toulon and his little friends are still on the run, and decide to hide in the Kolewige, an inn 4 mi (6.4 km) from the Swiss border. Blade finds the wooden head of an old puppet named Cyclops in their trunk, and when Toulon sees it, he then tells his puppets the adventures he had with the woman he loves, and his retro puppets, starting in Cairo, Egypt, in 1902.

A 3,000-year-old Egyptian sorcerer, named Afzel, had stolen the secret of life, and was fleeing the servants of an evil Egyptian god, named Sutekh. Two servants, imbued with magical power from Sutekh, attack him, but are killed easily by Afzel and his own magical power. After dispatching the two servants he begins his journey to Paris.

Meanwhile, Sutekh has given life to three of his oldest servants—Egyptian mummies. After they rise from their chamber they too begin to pursue Afzel. Cut to Paris, where a young André Toulon is putting on a puppet show of Dante's Divine Comedy. Watching from the crowd is Elsa, who has left her cruel, cold-hearted, abusive ambassador father and harmless mother to view the wonders of the country and has decided to see the play. In the sewers nearby, the three mummies have hired two thugs to kill Afzel. The thugs are necessary since Afzel has the power to sense the coming of the mummies.

Afzel is beaten brutally until Elsa, leaving the theater, sees them and cries for help. The thugs then scatter, leaving Toulon and Elsa to pick Afzel up and bring him inside. Later, when he stirs from his sleep, he talks with Toulon and reveals that he knows the secret of life, and it's the only thing that can protect humankind when the elder gods rise up in 100-1,000 years, and needs to pass it on to Toulon. Toulon is skeptical until Afzel begins to make the puppets move. Now Toulon realizes he is genuine and begins to learn his powers. Afzel then starts to make the puppets draw a barrier that's supposed to protect him if the servants come back.

While stepping outside for a brief moment, Toulon begins to talk to a beggar who has sat on the steps since the beginning of the movie. However, he is dead, and when Andre becomes aware of this he begins to mourn. Afzel tells him to bring him inside to teach him the true secret of life. After bringing him inside they use a ring to transfer the soul of the beggar to the puppet, "Pinhead". The puppet starts to move but, after a few questions the puppet runs away into the theater. Later on, Elsa returns to talk to Toulon, until her father's rude servants come by. They take Elsa and Toulon back to her house, and after Toulon talks to Elsa's father, he gets knocked out, then thrown into the woods.

The next day, back at the theater, Valentin storms in as the barrier written on paper falls off the wall. The three mummies see their chance to attack and begin their rampage through the theater. Valentin finishes repairing the door as two of the mummies break in and kill him. Vigo runs backstage to Duval and Latour and falls dead. Duval stabs the lead mummy in his hand as the mummy kills him with his other hand. Latuor gets out a gun and shoots the lead mummy three times as the other mummy comes in through the back door and all three of them use their magic to kill him. Afzel appears and says Sutekh shall not claim his life, and kills himself with his own magic. Satisfied with victory, the mummies begin to leave. Once Toulon returns from the woods, he sees what has happened and acts quickly by putting their souls inside his puppets.

The men return, having sensed someone with the knowledge of the secret of life, and try to kill Toulon. Six-Shooter, however, kills them by shooting the chandelier chains, causing it to crush them. Sutekh appears to them (off-screen) and brings them back to life. The servants beg him for mercy and the chance to kill Toulon. Sutekh restores their killing powers, but they can no longer sense Toulon's presence. Sutekh instructs them to capture Elsa to lure Toulon into a trap.

Feeling that he had won the battle, Toulon and his puppets go to a train station to leave Paris for Calais, France before things start to get bad, not realizing they already had. The servants kill Elsa's father and the guards, and capture Elsa, then send a dream to Toulon that shows Elsa tied up and a train. Knowing the meaning, he quickly changes trains to Marseille and gets his puppets ready for the showdown. When the train leaves, Toulon looks around, having released his puppets and letting them follow him throughout the train, until finally coming to the last car and finding Elsa tied up like in his dream. The two men appear and ask for the secret of life. Toulon displays the scroll where the secret is written and asks, "How do you know this is the only copy?" to which the leader states he did not have enough time to copy it, but still is doubtful he hadn't. Toulon, noticing he is distracted, attacks the leader while his puppets attack the other. A large struggle breaks out, and the other servant is killed with the final leader of the three being thrown from the car. Freeing Elsa, the group rides away in the train, beginning their adventure. After telling the story, the puppets wonder what happened to the other puppets. Toulon tells them that's another story, which he will tell them in the future.

== Cast ==
- Guy Rolfe as Elder André Toulon
- Greg Sestero as Young André Toulon
  - Sestero's 2013 book The Disaster Artist, while primarily focusing on his most famous film The Room, includes two chapters on his casting in and filming of Retro Puppet Master.
- Brigitta Dau as Elsa
- Stephen Blackehart as First Servant
- Jack Donner as Afzel
- Robert Radoveanu as Second Servant
- Vitalie Bantas as Third Servant
- Sandu Teodor as Latour
- George Calin as Valentin
- Juliano Doman as Vigo
- Vlad Dulea as Duval
- Dan Fintescu as Beggar
- Serban Celea as Father
- Elvira Deatcu as Margarette
- Claudiu Trandafir as Leader
- Marcello Cobzariu as First Tough
- Viorel Manole as Second Tough
- Mihai Verbițchi as First Pursuer (credited as Mihai Verbinschi)
- Adrian Ciobanu as Second Pursuer
- Răzvan Popa as Assistant
- Aurelian Popa as Official
- Cristian Irimia as Conductor
- Ion Bechet as Ticket Agent

=== Featured puppets ===
- Blade
- Pinhead
- Leech Woman
- Jester
- Tunneler
- Six Shooter

=== Retro Puppets ===
- Retro Blade
- Retro Pinhead
- Drill Sergeant (Retro Tunneler)
- Retro Six-Shooter
- Doctor Death
- Cyclops

== Production ==
After reviving the Puppet Master franchise with Curse of the Puppet Master in 1998, Full Moon decided to make another prequel. The original idea for the film was to take place following Puppet Master III: Toulon's Revenge, with Toulon and his puppets escaping Germany by train, after which they are confronted by Nazis and demons. This idea was abandoned because the distributor, the Kushner Locke Company, thought it would offend the German audience. The plot was changed to instead explore Andre Tulon as a teenager and how he learned the magical techniques used to bring the puppets to life.

The film was shot in Romania over two weeks in the fall of 1998, with a budget of around $30,000. The film is notable for being the only entry in the series to both not feature the theme music composed by Richard Band and be rated PG-13. Retro Puppet Master was Guy Rolfe's last appearance as Andre Toulon, aside from stock footage in Puppet Master: The Legacy.

== Release ==
Retro Puppet Master was released direct to video on VHS and DVD in 1999. The film was re-released on DVD in 2012 as part of a nine-film collection of the series by Echo Bridge Home Entertainment.

In 2017, the film was released on Blu-ray as part of a box set in a container resembling Andre Toulon's trunk. Due to issues with the original film negative, a lot of footage in this release was taken from the lower-quality VHS release and some visual effects were redone digitally. This Blu-ray was released in 2020 as part of a different box set that included the same contents, contained in a carboard sleeve instead of the wooden trunk.
