= Puppet Master: Axis Termination =

- Release poster
- Directed by: Charles Band
- Written by: Roger Barron
- Produced by: Charles Band
- Production company: Full Moon Entertainment
- Release date: September 15, 2017
- Running time: 75 minutes
- Country: United States
- Language: English

Puppet Master: Axis Termination is a 2017 film directed by Charles Band. It is the eleventh film of the Puppet Master series. The film continues where Puppet Master X: Axis Rising left off. It is the third and final installment of the Axis Trilogy.

== Plot ==
After the events of Axis Rising, Danny and Beth arrange to meet with Captain Brooks so that they can hand over the puppets to be used in the American war effort. But a Nazi spy posing as Brooks arrives first, and fatally shoots Danny and mortally wounds Beth before Brooks arrives and kills him. With her dying words, Beth begs Brooks to look after the puppets.

Brooks takes the puppets back to his boss Captain Kip Hansard. There, Brooks discovers that the American army had been tipped off about the Nazis using the occult to give life to their own puppets; the Nazis had successfully killed an American general (Porter from the previous film) and eight American citizens. Hansard needs Brooks to work with a team of psychics led by Doctor Ivan Ivanov to find out how the puppets work, so that they can use the magic inside of them to help the American war effort. Brooks is not happy with this assignment, as he does not like being told what to do by a Russian 'dwarf' and also does not believe in living puppets or psychic phenomena. While he stays with them, he quickly begins to gain their respect and believe in their powers after Ivan's daughter reads his thoughts and brings back his horrific war incident.

A few days after he has settled in with the psychic group, there’s an explosion in a power station that knocks out all of the power to the city. So they, along with Blade, Tunneler and Leech Woman, go to the location to investigate. While they're there, they are ambushed by Sturmbahnfurher Krabke, who is a psychic Nazi with stronger powers than any of them, and he uses his magic to stun them all to the ground. They are rescued by Leech Woman who spits a leech onto his eye, allowing them to all escape and regroup. When they return home, they discover that Ivan's daughter has been kidnapped and the psychics use their powers to trace her location: an old mansion that a large group of Nazi spies are hiding in.

Brooks, with the help of the puppets, raid the building, killing as many of the Nazis as possible, before coming face to face with Krabke again. Krabke uses his powers to paralyze Brooks to the ground, but Pinhead grabs Krabke by the throat and chokes the life out of him. After killing most of the Nazis, they return home where they place the puppets into the trunk to rest.

== Cast ==
- Tonya Kay - Doktor Gerde Ernst
- Paul Logan - Captain Brooks
- Jean Louise O'Sullivan - Beth
- Kevin Scott Allen - Sturmbannführer Krabke
- Tania Fox - Elisa Ivanov
- Kyle Devero - Corporal Saunders
- Rob Vardaro - Thomas Otterman
- Lilou Vos - Oberhelfer Friede Steitze
- Daniele Romer - Antoinette Longpre
- Nick Vernon - George
- Allen Perada - General Kip Hansard
- Mat Cruz - Greg
- George Appleby - Dr. Ivan
- Kip Canyon - Danny Coogan
- Josh Ludemann - Bobby
- Alynxia America - Georgina Vale
- David DeCoteau - Flamboyant Nazi #1
- Todd W. Fulkerson - Bartender
- Jessica Morris - Bar Patroness
- Robin Sydney - Bar Patroness

== Featured Puppets ==
- Blade
- Pinhead
- Leech Woman
- Jester
- Tunneler
- Six-Shooter

=== Antagonists ===
- BombShell
- Blitzkrieg
- Weremacht

== Reception ==
Bloody Disgusting said, "Puppet Master: Axis Termination is arguably the strongest film of the “Axis Trilogy” (and notably directed by the series’ creator, Charles Band, at that), but that’s truly not saying much."
