= Guy Rolfe =

British actor (1911–2003)

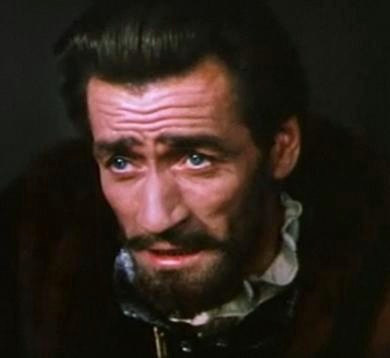
- Rolfe in Young Bess (1953)
- Born: Edwin Arthur Rolfe; 27 December 1911; Kilburn, London, England
- Died: 19 October 2003 (aged 91); Ipswich, Suffolk, England
- Resting place: St Mary's, Benhall, Suffolk
- Occupation: Actor
- Years active: 1932–2002
- Spouses: Jane Aird (m. 19??; died 1993); Margaret Allworthy (m. 19??)

Rolfe, 1968

Guy Rolfe (born Edwin Arthur Rolfe; 27 December 1911 – 19 October 2003) was a British character actor. He was best known for portraying villains.

== Career ==
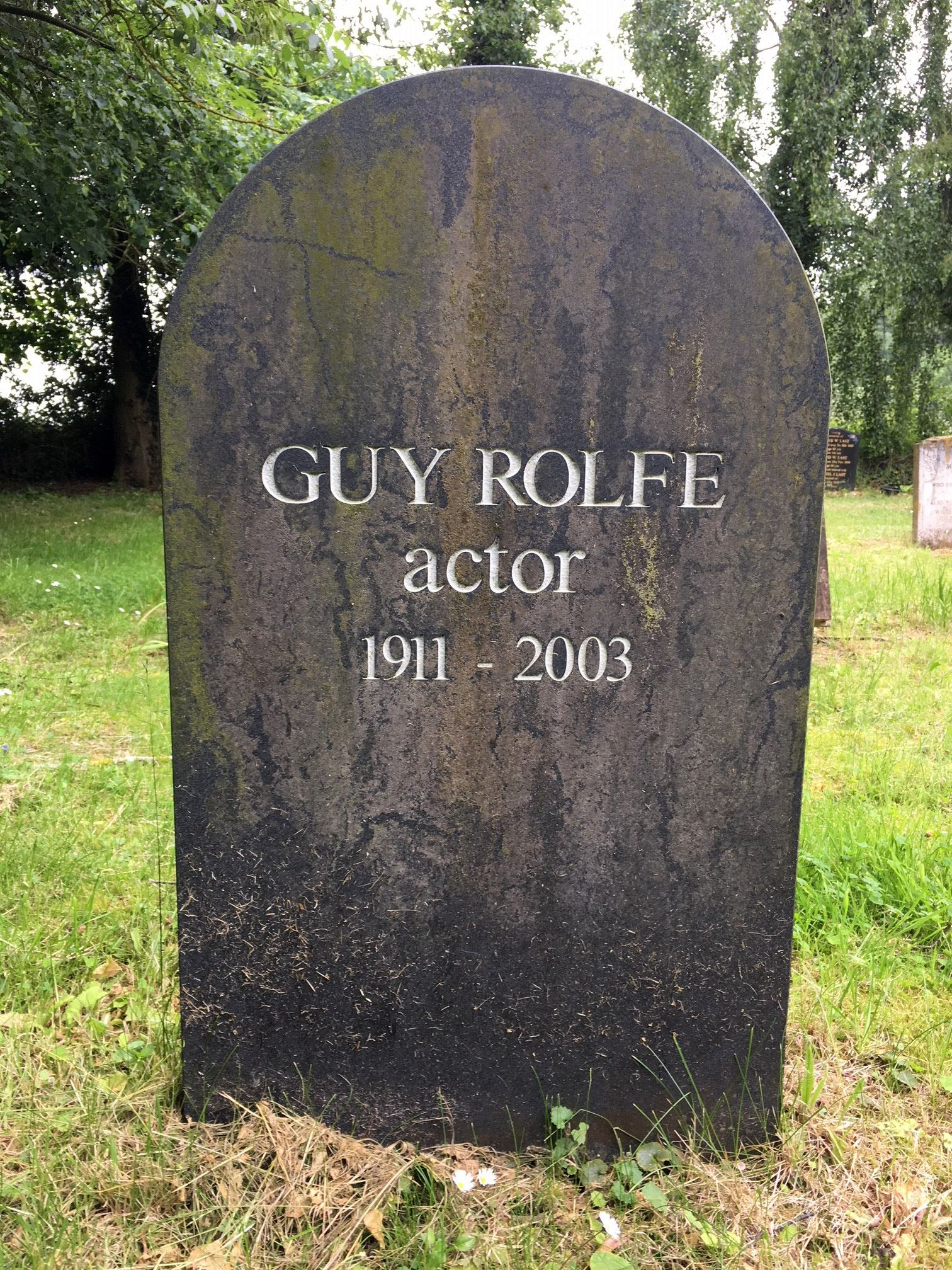
The grave of Guy Rolfe in the churchyard St Mary's, Benhall

Rolfe was born in Kilburn, London. Before turning to acting at the age of 24 he was a professional boxer and racing driver, making his stage debut in Ireland in 1935. Repertory theatre led to his screen debut in 1937 with an uncredited appearance in Knight Without Armour.

After the Second World War he re-appeared in a number of bit parts throughout 1947 in films like Hungry Hill and Odd Man Out, which in turn led to larger roles in movies such as Uncle Silas (1947), Easy Money (1948) and in particular Ken Annakin's Broken Journey (1948), where he played the pilot of an aeroplane that crashes in the Alps. He then graduated to leading man status in Terence Fisher's Portrait from Life (1948), as a British army officer who helps an Austrian professor track down his missing daughter. 1949 saw perhaps his best role, that of safe cracker turned spy Philippe Lodocq in Robert Hamer's The Spider and the Fly.

He was cast as a British Army major dying of tuberculosis for the film Trio (1950), but actually contracted the disease and had to be replaced by Michael Rennie. He recovered his health in less than a year, but his time away from the screen hurt his career, and he starred in less prestigious B movies such as Home to Danger (1951) and Operation Diplomat (1953), as well as the Hammer films Yesterday's Enemy and The Stranglers of Bombay (both 1959). This period also saw him play a number of Hollywood roles, such as Prince John in Ivanhoe (1952), Ned Seymour in Young Bess (1953), Caiaphas in King of Kings (1961) and Prince Grigory in Taras Bulba (1962).

One of his most famous parts was the title role in William Castle's cult horror film Mr. Sardonicus (1961), which several decades later led director Stuart Gordon to cast him in his horror film Dolls (1987). The 1990s saw him continue in a similar vein when he appeared in five films of the Puppet Master series as André Toulon. Rolfe played Sherlock Holmes in The Case of Marcel Duchamp (1984), an art documentary-cum-Holmes pastiche.

On television he played the memorably sinister Yves de Charolais in the episode Death on Reflection in the classic series Department S (1969).

Other television credits include Thriller, Armchair Theatre, The Saint, The Avengers, The Champions, The Troubleshooters, Space: 1999, Secret Army, The Widow of Bath and Kessler.

== Personal life ==
He was married to the Scottish actress Jane Aird until her death in 1993, and then to Margret Allworthy until his death in 2003 in Ipswich, Suffolk. He is buried in the churchyard of St Mary's in Benhall, Suffolk.

Rolfe's Home to Danger co-star Rona Anderson told historian Brian McFarlane, "Guy was a strange, very saturnine man who used to play vingt-et-un for money - and always used to win - while we were sitting around on the set. I was rather dubious about him, but one day I had a scene where I had to ride a horse, but the thing went out of control. I couldn't make it stop... The next thing I knew, I was lying in the mud and who should be picking me up and wrapping me in his camel-hair coat but Guy Rolfe, so I changed my opinion of him after that."

== Complete filmography ==
- 1937 Knight Without Armour as Minor Role (uncredited)
- 1938 The Drum as Undetermined Role (uncredited)
- 1947 Hungry Hill as Miner
- 1947 Odd Man Out as Policeman Watching Kathleen's House (uncredited)
- 1947 Meet Me at Dawn as Ambassador's Friend (uncredited)
- 1947 The Life and Adventures of Nicholas Nickleby as Mr. Folair (uncredited)
- 1947 Uncle Silas as Sepulchre Hawkes
- 1948 Easy Money as Archie
- 1948 Broken Journey as Fox
- 1948 The Guardsman (TV Movie)
- 1948 Saraband for Dead Lovers as Envoy At Ahlden
- 1949 Which Will Ye Have? (Short) as Captain of The Guard
- 1948 Portrait from Life as Major Lawrence
- 1949 Fools Rush In as Paul Dickson
- 1949 The Spider and the Fly as Philippe de Ledocq
- 1950 The Reluctant Widow as Lord Carlyon
- 1950 Prelude to Fame as John Morell
- 1951 Home to Danger as Robert Irving
- 1952 Ivanhoe as Prince John
- 1952 Without the Prince (TV Movie)
- 1953 Young Bess as Edward "Ned" Seymour
- 1953 The Veils of Bagdad as Kasseim
- 1953 Operation Diplomat as Dr. Mark Fenton
- 1953 King of the Khyber Rifles as Karram Khan
- 1954 Dance Little Lady as Dr. John Ransome
- 1956 It's Never Too Late as Stephen Hodgson
- 1956 You Can't Escape as David Anstruther
- 1957 Light Fingers as Dennis Payne
- 1958 Girls at Sea as Captain Alwin Maitland
- 1958 Murder in Mind (TV Movie)
- 1959 Yesterday's Enemy as Padre
- 1959 The Stranglers of Bombay as Captain Harry Lewis
- 1960 The Barbarians as Kainus
- 1961 Snow White and the Three Stooges as Count Oga
- 1961 Mr. Sardonicus as Baron Sardonicus / Marek Toleslawski
- 1961 King of Kings as Caiaphas
- 1962 Taras Bulba as Prince Grigory
- 1964 The Fall of the Roman Empire as Marius (uncredited)
- 1965 The Alphabet Murders as Duncan Doncaster
- 1970 Land Raiders as Major Tanner
- 1971 Nicholas and Alexandra as Dr. Fedorov
- 1973 And Now the Screaming Starts! as Lawyer Maitland
- 1979 Bloodline as Tod Michaels
- 1984 The Case of Marcel Duchamp as Sherlock Holmes
- 1985 The Bride as Count
- 1987 Dolls as Gabriel Hartwicke
- 1987 Visiting Mr. Beak (Short) as Mr. Beak
- 1991 Puppet Master III: Toulon's Revenge as André Toulon
- 1993 Puppet Master 4 as André Toulon
- 1994 Puppet Master 5: The Final Chapter as André Toulon
- 1999 Retro Puppet Master as André Toulon
