= Gordon Currie (actor) =

Canadian actor

- Born: Vancouver, British Columbia, Canada
- Occupations: Actor; director; producer
- Years active: 1988 - 2009
- Spouses: Sarah Plommer (m. 1999; div. 2003); Maxine McCulloch; 2004

Gordon Currie is a Canadian film and television actor, best known for his role as Nicolae Carpathia in the Left Behind films, and his role in horror films such as Puppet Master 4, Puppet Master 5, Friday the 13th Part VIII: Jason Takes Manhattan and Blood and Donuts. Currie has also directed, written, and produced several films, and works in both the United States and Canada in television and film roles.

== Early life ==
Currie was born in Vancouver, British Columbia, Canada. One of his first breakthrough roles was playing Officer Palone on 21 Jump Street (1987). In 1991, after a couple of years working in locally shot TV and film in Vancouver, he moved to Los Angeles to study acting; his first roommate was Brad Pitt.

== Career ==
Currie rented a two-bedroom flat off Melrose Avenue in California, where he lived for two years with roommate Brad Pitt. He worked for a while as a Ronald McDonald clown before moving on to roles on television and film, including two roles on Beverly Hills, 90210, playing both Bobby Walsh, Brandon's (Jason Priestley) and Brenda's (Shannen Doherty) wheelchair-using cousin, and the role of Danny Five, Colin's (Jason Wiles) cocaine dealer. In 1987, he received one of his first roles as Officer Palone on the series 21 Jump Street, episode "Two for the Road". He played in Vancouver television and film roles, as well as roles in the Joel Schumacher film Cousins, Friday the 13th Part VIII: Jason Takes Manhattan, The Terror Within II, Puppet Master 4, Puppet Master 5: The Final Chapter, and My Blue Heaven (starring Steve Martin, Rick Moranis and Joan Cusack) before making the move to Los Angeles in 1991. Two years later, he had a supporting role in Alive (1993 film)

His most prominent role has been that of Nicolae Carpathia in the series of films Left Behind, based on the series of best-selling books by Tim LaHaye and Jerry B. Jenkins. His character, Nicolae Carpathia, is the Antichrist, who attempts to marshal the forces of the Global Community against the followers of Christ.

== Filmography ==
=== Film ===
Year	Project	Role	Notes
1988	Distant Thunder	Billy Watson	
1989	Cousins	Dean Kozinski	
1989	Friday the 13th Part VIII: Jason Takes Manhattan	Miles Wolfe	
1989	American Boyfriends	Glider	
1990	My Blue Heaven	Wally Bunting	
1991	The Terror Within II	Aaron	
1993	Alive	Coche Inciarte	
1993	Puppet Master 4	Richard "Rick" Myers	
1994	Puppet Master 5: The Final Chapter	Richard "Rick" Myers	
1995	Blood and Donuts	Boya	
1996	Listen	Jake Taft	
1996	Ripe	Pete	
1997	Laserhawk	M.K. Ultra	
1998	Dog Park	Trevor	
1999	The Fear: Halloween Night	Mike Hawthorne	
2000	Falling Through	Peter	
2000	waydowntown	Curt Schwin	
2000	Left Behind	Nicolae Carpathia	
2002	The Fraternity AKA The Circle	Tom Wilkinson	
2002	Fairytales and Pornography	Raphael	
2002	Blocked	Mugger	Also director
2002	Left Behind II: Tribulation Force	Nicolae Carpathia	
2003	The Happy Couple	Stan	
2003	The Pedestrian	Travis Lack	
2004	Highwaymen	Ray Boone	
2005	Left Behind: World at War	Nicolae Carpathia	
2005	The Dark Hours	David Goodman	
2006	The Sentinel	Director's Aide	
2006	The Woods	The Sheriff	
2008	This Is Not a Test	Rick Smyth	
2009	The Death of Alice Blue	Julian	

=== Television ===
Year	Project	Role	Notes
1987	21 Jump Street	Officer Palones	1 episode
1988	Danger Bay	Gene Curtis	2 episode
1989	Bordertown	Carl Jensen	1 episode
1991	The Killing Mind	Pizza Boy	Television film
1991–1996	Beverly Hills, 90210	Danny Five Bobby Walsh	4 episodes
1992	The Hat Squad	Young Guard	1 episode
1993	Murder, She Wrote	Sean Griffith	1 episode
1993	Dieppe	Stefan	Miniseries
1994	Janek: The Silent Betrayal	Wheeler	Television film
1995	Taking the Falls	Mr. Preston	1 episode
1995	Falling for You	Henry	Television film
1995	Forever Knight	Sean Du Champs	1 episode
1997	The Sentinel	Ronnie	1 episode
1997	Viper	Noel Flynn	1 episode
1998	Playing to Win: A Moment of Truth Movie	Frank	Television film
1998	Poltergeist: The Legacy	Chevalier	1 episode
1998	Mercy Point	Hayden Revell	1 episode
1998	Highlander: The Raven	Wilson Geary	1 episode
1998	The Outer Limits	Stadetski	1 episode
1998–1999	First Wave	Elton Beleye	2 episodes
2000	Code Name: Eternity	Dent	26 episodes
2000	Twice in a Lifetime	Jake Connor	1 episode
2001	Mutant X	Frank Cross	1 episode
2001	Haven	Jimmy	Television film
2001	Leap Years	Randy Gendel	8 episodes
2002	Earth: Final Conflict	Chase McBride	1 episode
2002	The Chris Isaak Show	Josh Hipwell	1 episode
2002	Beyond Belief: Fact or Fiction	Douglas Hibbard	1 episode
2002–2004	Blue Murder	Noel Watson Conrad Wasson	2 episodes
2003	Street Time	Bob Morgan	1 episode
2003	A Crime of Passion	Alan Leach	Television film
2004	Doc	Caz Truman	1 episode
2004	Deadly Visions	John Culver	Television film
2005	Missing	Derek Conway	1 episode
