= Puppet Master II =

1991 US horror film directed by David W. Allen

- Theatrical release poster
- Directed by: Dave Allen
- Written by: David Pabian
- Produced by: Charles Band
- Starring: Elizabeth Maclellan; Collin Bernsen; Gregory Webb; Charlie Spradling; Steve Welles; Jeff Weston; Ivan J. Rado; Sage Allen; George "Buck" Flower; Nita Talbot
- Cinematography: Thomas F. Denove
- Edited by: Bert Glatstein; Peter Teschner
- Music by: Richard Band
- Distributed by: Full Moon Entertainment; Paramount Pictures
- Release dates: November 17, 1990 (United Kingdom); February 7, 1991 (United States)
- Running time: 88 minutes
- Country: United States
- Language: English
- Budget: $780,000

Puppet Master II is a 1990 direct-to-video horror film written by David Pabian and directed by Dave Allen. It is the second film in the Puppet Master franchise, the sequel to 1989's Puppet Master, and stars Elizabeth Maclellan, Gregory Webb, Charlie Spradling, Jeff Weston and Nita Talbot as paranormal investigators who are terrorized by the animate puppets of an undead Andre Toulon, played by Steve Welles.

Puppet Master II, as well as the third, fourth and fifth installments of the series, were only available in DVD format through a Full Moon Features box set that was briefly discontinued, until in 2007 when Full Moon Features reacquired the rights to the first five films. A remastered edition Blu-ray and DVD of the film was released on September 18, 2012.

== Plot ==
André Toulon's grave is shown being excavated in Shady Oaks cemetery behind the Bodega Bay Inn. Pinhead dusts off and opens Toulon's casket, then climbs out and pours a vial of neon liquid on the corpse, while Tunneler, Leech Woman, Blade and Jester watch on from the grave's edge as the skeleton's arms rise into the air.

A few months later, parapsychologists Carolyn Bramwell, her brother Patrick, and the flirtatious Lance and Wanda, are sent to the hotel to investigate the strange murder of Megan Gallagher, whose brain was extracted through her nose by Blade.

Alex Whitaker, driven insane from the events of the first film, is suspected of Megan's murder and locked up in an asylum. While at the asylum, his terrible seizures and premonitions are perceived as lunatic rantings.

Their guest psychic, Camille Kenney, decides to leave after spotting two puppets in her room. Kenney warns the others that they are not safe; however while packing, Pinhead and Jester attack and kidnap her. The next day, Camille is discovered missing, after the group finds Camille's belongings and car still at the hotel, but no Camille. Carolyn calls Camille's son to inform him of his mother's status.

Later that evening, while Patrick is sleeping, Tunneler drills into Patrick's head, killing him. Lance and Wanda burst into the room, finding Patrick dying. Lance kills Tunneler by crushing him with a lamp. The remaining investigators dissect Tunneler and realize that the puppets are not remote controlled, but rather run on a chemical they determine is the secret of artificial intelligence.

The next morning, a man named Eriquee Chaneé (the reanimated Toulon in disguise) enters the hotel, stating that he had inherited it after Megan's death, and that he has just returned from Bucharest. They doubt his claim, but he tells them they can stay and investigate although his quarters are off limits to them. Afterwards, Michael arrives at the hotel, worried about his mother, Camille.

That evening, Blade and Leech Woman go to a local farmer's house where Leech Woman kills the husband, Matthew, taking his eye. His wife, Martha manages to throw Leech Woman into the furnace. As Martha is about to shoot Blade with a shotgun, a new puppet, Torch, walks in and kills Martha with a flame-thrower built into his arm. Blade takes a piece of her charred remains, and he and Torch return to Eriquee/Toulon where it is revealed he believes that Carolyn is a reincarnation of his now deceased wife, Elsa. Toulon has a flashback to Cairo, 1912 when he and Elsa bought the formula for animating inanimate objects.

The next morning, Michael and Carolyn go into town to find Camille and to find out more about Eriquee Chanee. Meanwhile, the puppets are killing various people because they are growing weaker and need the secret ingredient that makes Toulon's formula work: brain tissue. Carolyn finds no records of "Eriquee Chaneé", and starts to connect him to the disappearance of Camille and the death of her brother, Patrick. Later, Carolyn and Michael share a romantic night together, as do Lance and Wanda. Blade then kills Lance and Wanda, and uses their tissue for the formula.

During this, Carolyn sneaks into Toulon's room, and finds two life sized mannequins in the wardrobe. Toulon sneaks up behind Carolyn, and still thinking she is Elsa, ties her up. Michael goes to rescue her, all while fighting off Torch, Pinhead, and Blade. On his way up, the dumbwaiter opens, revealing Jester and Michael's dead mother, Camille. Toulon transfers his soul into one of the mannequins, and explains that after seeing Carolyn, he decided for them to live together forever. The puppets, upon hearing this, realize Toulon used them for his evil needs, and start torturing him. Michael then breaks into the room, saves Carolyn, and the two run out of the hotel. Up in the attic, Torch sets Toulon on fire, causing him to fall out a window and die. Afterward, Jester goes back to Camille's body with the remaining formula.

After her soul has been placed into the female mannequin, the "revived" Camille decides to drive the puppets to the Bouldeston Institution for the Mentally Troubled Tots and Teens in her car, so they can "enchant" the children.

== Cast ==
- Steve Welles as André Toulon / Eriquee Chaneé
- Elizabeth Maclellan as Carolyn Bramwell / Elsa Toulon
- Michael Todd as Puppet Toulon
- Julianne Mazziotti as Puppet Camille / Elsa Toulon
- Collin Bernsen as Michael Kenney
- Greg Webb as Patrick Bramwell (as Gregory Webb)
- Charlie Spradling as Wanda
- Jeff Weston as Lance
- Nita Talbot as Camille Kenney
- Sage Allen as Martha
- George Buck Flower as Mathew
- Sean B. Ryan as Billy
- Alex Band and Taryn Band as Cairo Children

=== Featured puppets ===
- Blade
- Jester
- Pinhead
- Tunneler
- Leech Woman
- Torch
- Mephisto (flashback)
- Djinn the Homunculus (flashback)

== Production ==
=== Development ===
Following the success of the first Puppet Master film, work began on a sequel. Executive producer Charles band hired Dave Pabian to write the screenplay, and told him not to worry about maintaining strict continuity with the first film. Pabian's script included themes of gothic horror, reincarnation and Egyptian mythology, inspired by his love of the Universal Monsters films, particularly The Mummy. The film was directed by stop motion animator David W. Allen. Band stated that Full Moon's distributor, Paramount Pictures, disliked the puppet Leech Woman, finding her "disgusting", and wanted her killed off. However, other crew members said that Leech Woman's death was Band's choice, as he thought that she did not work as a character. Because of this, Pabian wrote the scene where Martha kills Leech Woman. He also wrote the character André Toulon as a villain out of disinterest toward his nicer portrayal in the first film, citing the effects of Toulon's post-death decomposition as the reason for his change in behavior.

=== Filming ===
Principal photography began on July 17, 1990. The film was shot in Los Angeles, California. The Mary Andrews Clark Memorial Home was used for the interior and exterior of the Bodega Bay Inn. According to producer David DeCoteau and several cast and crew members, while Allen was a talented stop-motion animator, he was difficult to work with as a director. Allen would take hours to produce very little work, and commanded no respect toward the cast and crew on set, which included treating the puppets better than the actors. DeCoteau wanted to fire Allen, but Band would not let him since Allen owned the puppets that he created, and Band needed them for more sequels. The film went five days over schedule as a result, and had 63 incomplete scenes.

=== Casting ===
Casting was done by Perry Bullington and Robert MacDonald. Actors and actors cast for the film included Steve Welles, Elizabeth Maclellan, Michael Todd, Julianne Mazziotti, Collin Bernsen, Greg Webb, Charlie Spradling, Jeff Weston, Nita Talbot, Sage Allen, George Buck Flower, and Sean B. Ryan. Carolyn Bramwell and Elsa Toulon were Maclellan's last acting roles. Spradling, who played Wanda, would later become the host of the Full Moon Fan Club and official spokesperson for the company. Band's children Alex Band and Taryn Band made cameo appearances as two children watching André Toulon's puppet show in Cairo.

=== Special effects ===
The puppet effects and stop motion animation were supervised by David W. Allen and done by Santos Avila, Robert D. Bailey, Joanne Bloomfield, Yancy Calzada, Steven Davis, Glen Eisner, Lynette Eklund, Chris Endicott, Carla Fallberg, Paul Gentry, Dennis Gordon, Eric Hardy, Jean Horihata, Christian Johnston, Donna Littleford, Dennis McClean, Tony McCray, Steve Neill, Scott Oshita, Brian Prosser, Mark Rappaport, Lisa Sturz, Brett B. White, John Teska, Randall William Cook, Joe Viskocil, and Justin Kohn at David Allen Productions. According to Endicott, the Tunneler puppet had his eyes closed the entire time, which required the effects team to put black tape on his eyes in some scenes to make them appear open. Four different Torch puppets were designed for certain scenes in the film. Stunts were coordinated by Chuck Borden and performed by Ric New, Janet Lee Orcutt, and Dyanna Lynn. The makeup effects were done by David P. Barton, John Calpin, David Gamboa, Hal Jahlikakik, David Lange, Lorelei Loverde, Leonard MacDonald, Sean Rodgers, Jordu Schell, Brian Sipe, Yolanda Squatpump, and Johnny Vegaline at Modus EFX.

Welles' role as André Toulon required hours of makeup and head-wrapping in bandages for him to portray the role, inspired by The Invisible Man and The Phantom of the Opera. According to Barton, a photograph of the Borremose man was used as reference when creating the makeup for Toulon's decomposed face.

== Reception ==
In a contemporary review, Variety described the film as "okay followup to the gory William Hickey-starrer" and that the "use of stop-motion puppet effects should please genre fans".

== Bibliography ==
- Prouty, Howard H., ed. (1994). Variety Television Reviews 1923-1992. Garland Publishing Inc. ISBN 0-8240-3796-0.
- Brehmer, Nat (September 27, 2021). Puppet Master Complete: A Franchise History. McFarland Publishing. ISBN 978-1-476-64519-3.
