= Curse of the Puppet Master =

- Theatrical release poster
- Directed by: David DeCoteau
- Written by: Benjamin Carr
- Produced by: Charles Band; Gordon Gustafson; Kirk Edward Hansen
- Starring: George Peck; Emily Harrison; Josh Green; Michael Guerin; Robert Donavan; Michael Sollenberger; Marc Newburger; Jason-Shane Scott; Scott Boyer
- Cinematography: Howard Wexler
- Edited by: J. R. Bookwalter
- Music by: Jeffrey Walton
- Production company: Full Moon Entertainment
- Distributed by: Multicom Entertainment Group Inc.
- Release date: May 26, 1998
- Running time: 78 minutes
- Country: United States
- Language: English
- Budget: $250,000

Curse of the Puppet Master (also released as Curse of the Puppet Master: The Human Experiment) is a 1998 direct-to-video horror film written by Benjamin Carr and directed by David DeCoteau. The sixth film in the Puppet Master franchise, it stars George Peck as scientist Dr. Magrew, who experiments with transforming humans into puppets.

== Plot ==
The film begins at The House of Marvels, a doll museum, where Dr. Magrew stuffs something into a crate before driving into the woods and setting it on fire. The next morning, Magrew's daughter Jane, who has just returned home from college, asks her father about his assistant Matt. He tells her that Matt left because his father was ill. Driving into town, Magrew and Jane interrupt bully Joey Carp harassing Robert Winsley at a gas station. Jane finds a statue that Robert was carving, and Magrew offers Robert a job helping him with the Marvel show, which Robert accepts.

Returning home, they introduce Robert to Toulon's puppets, which are alive. Magrew says he tried to make a living puppet, but failed, and asks Robert to help him carve the new puppet. The next day, during the show, Sheriff Garvey and Deputy Wayburn tell Magrew that Matt is missing, and Magrew tells them he hasn’t seen him. Magrew gives Robert the blueprints for the puppet, instructing him to “put your soul into it". Robert begins carving and works non-stop.

One night, Robert has a nightmare that his legs have turned to wood. Later, Jane tries to distract him while working, causing him to cut himself. They flirt and end up kissing. That night, Robert has another nightmare that his entire body is wooden from the neck down. The next day, Jane and Robert drive to the woods, where they find the box that Magrew burnt at the beginning of the film.

Robert finds a carved wooden hand in the box. Meanwhile Jane walks off and encounters Joey and his friends, who sexually harass her. Robert arrives and defends Jane, but Joey threatens to rape her. Robert attacks Joey, but Jane pulls him away and they return to the house. Robert confesses that he felt a strange feeling while he was choking Joey, and Magrew tells him it was his violent inner self. Robert expresses fear that this self will appear again.

That night, Joey comes to the "House of Marvels" to beat Robert up, and decides to try again to rape Jane. Jane tells him to leave, and the doll Pinhead attacks Joey and chokes him, but Joey pulls him off and damages him. When Magrew and Robert arrive, Joey escapes. Magrew takes Blade and Tunneler to Joey's house and they kill him. Back at the house, Robert shows Jane that he fixed Pinhead, and they kiss. Returning, Magrew sees Robert coming out of Jane's room, and confronts her, becoming angry when she says she loves Robert, before leaving. Five days later, Jane finds Robert very sick. She asks her father to call the doctor, but he only pretends to. He then tricks Jane into leaving on a fool’s errand while he waits for the non-existent doctor to arrive. A medical examiner believes that Joey's death was intentional. Sheriff Garvey questions Joey's friend Art, who mentions seeing Joey with Jane in the woods. Sheriff Garvey and Deputy Wayburn go to question Magrew at the House of Marvels, but they are killed by the puppets as Magrew watches, laughing.

Jane discovers that her father has not ordered any new dolls for six months, and returns to the woods to examine the burned box. The puppet inside speaks to her in Matt’s voice. She realizes she has to save Robert, and returns to the House. At the house, Magrew puts Robert's soul into the puppet Tank, but the puppets attack him, angry that he killed Robert. Jane arrives to find her father bleeding to death, pointing at Tank, saying "I did it". Suddenly, the Tank puppet points its arm at Magrew and shoots him dead with a bolt of electricity. The film ends with Magrew screaming before death, and Jane screaming in horrified terror.

== Cast ==
- George Peck as Dr. Magrew
- Emily Harrison as Jane Magrew
- Josh Green as Robert 'Tank' Winsley
- Michael D. Guerin Joey Carp
- Michael Sollenberger as Station Owner
- Marc Newburger as Art Cooney
- Scott Boyer as Larry
- Jason Dean Booher as Pogo
- Robert Donavan as Sheriff Garvey
- Jason-Shane Scott as Deputy Wayburn
- William Knight as Medical Examiner
- Patrick Thomas as Shipping Agent
- Ariauna Albright as Operator's Voice
- J. R. Bookwalter as Tommy Berke's Voice

=== Featured puppets ===
- Blade
- Pinhead
- Leech Woman
- Jester
- Tunneler
- Torch (Stock Footage only)
- Six-Shooter
- Matt (Freak)
- Tank
- Dummy

== Development ==
In the VideoZone for Puppet Master 5: The Final Chapter, Charles Band stated that while the film was intended to be the final installment of the Puppet Master series, a spin-off trilogy titled Puppet Wars was planned to begin in 1995 with the first entry tentatively titled Puppet Wars: The First Chapter. In Castle Freak's Videozone, the name was revealed to have been changed to Curse of the Puppet Master, with the plot involving Andre Tulon and the puppets in World War 2 fighting a mummy. The Puppet Wars series was canceled as a result of Paramount Pictures ending its distribution deal with Full Moon Entertainment in 1995.

Due to fan demand, Puppet Master was brought back in 1998 with a new film, reusing the Curse of the Puppet Master name. Production began around November 1997, and the film was shot over the course of eight days on a $200,000 budget. David W. Allen did not return to provide stop-motion effects, so the puppets were operated entirely using rod and string puppets, along with archival footage.

== Release ==
Curse of the Puppet Master was released direct to video on VHS and DVD in 1998. The film was re-released on DVD in 2012 as part of a nine-film collection of the series by Echo Bridge Home Entertainment.

In 2017, the film was released on Blu-ray as part of a box set in a container resembling Andre Toulon's trunk. Due to issues with the original film negative, a lot of footage in this release was taken from the lower-quality VHS release and some visual effects were redone digitally. This Blu-ray was released in 2020 as part of a different box set that included all the same contents, minus the wooden trunk.
