= Puppet Master III: Toulon's Revenge =

1991 American film directed by David DeCoteau

- DVD cover
- Directed by: David DeCoteau
- Written by: Charles Band; C. Courtney Joyner; David Schmoeller
- Produced by: Charles Band
- Starring: Guy Rolfe; Sarah Douglas; Walter Gotell; Ian Abercrombie; Kristopher Logan; Aron Eisenberg; Matthew Faison and Richard Lynch
- Cinematography: Adolfo Bartoli
- Edited by: Carol Oblath
- Music by: Richard Band
- Distributed by: Full Moon Entertainment; Paramount Pictures
- Release date: October 17, 1991
- Running time: 82 minutes
- Country: United States
- Languages: English; German
- Budget: $800,000

Puppet Master III: Toulon's Revenge is a 1991 American direct-to-video horror film written by Charles Band, C. Courtney Joyner and David Schmoeller, and directed by David DeCoteau. It is the third film in the Puppet Master franchise, a prequel to 1989's Puppet Master and 1990's Puppet Master II, and stars Guy Rolfe as André Toulon, a puppeteer whose ability to animate lifeless puppets attracts the attention of the Nazi authorities in Berlin during World War II. Richard Lynch, Ian Abercrombie, and Walter Gotell also appear in a supporting roles.

The film is also available on DVD along with the first two films on a triple feature "Midnight Horror Collection" at a budget price. A remastered edition Blu-ray and DVD of the film was released on September 18, 2012. A 4K UHD Blu-ray of the film was released on January 24, 2023.

== Plot ==
The film is set during 1941 in World War II Berlin. A scientist named Dr. Hess is forced by the Nazis, especially his Gestapo liaison Major Kraus, to create a drug capable of animating corpses to use as living shields on the battlefield after losing too many on the Eastern Front. But while the corpses do reanimate, they have a tendency towards mindless violence. In a small theater downtown, André Toulon has set up a satirical puppet show for children, in which a six-armed puppet named Six-Shooter attacks an inanimate reconstruction of Adolf Hitler. The show is also attended by Leutnant Erich Stein, Kraus' driver. After the performance, Toulon and his wife Elsa feed the puppets with the formula which sustains their life force, but they are watched by Stein, who informs his superior the next morning. Hess, genuinely fascinated by the formula, wants Toulon to freely share the secret with him, but Kraus wants to take Toulon in for treason and insulting the Führer.

The next day, André gives Elsa a puppet crafted in her likeness as a gift, but soon afterwards Kraus, Hess, and a squad of soldiers break into the atelier and take Toulon, Tunneler, and Pinhead. When Elsa attempts to prevent them from taking the formula as well, she is shot by one of the escort. When Kraus prepares to leave, the wounded Elsa spits at him in defiance, and Kraus shoots her dead in cold blood. However, while transporting Toulon off, the two soldiers guarding him are killed by Pinhead and Tunneler, enabling Toulon to escape.

After hiding for the remainder of the night, Toulon returns to his theater to find that the stage has been burnt by the Nazis. He finds Six-Shooter and Jester and leaves with them, then sets up camp in a partially destroyed hospital. Seeking revenge, Toulon breaks into the morgue to get Elsa's life essence and inserts it into the woman puppet, and as she comes to life, he inserts several leeches into her. Later that night, Toulon and his puppets ambush and kill Stein while he fixes Kraus' car. On his flight from his pursuers, Toulon subsequently finds shelter in a bombed-out building.

Back in his lab, Dr. Hess is studying Toulon's formula, and desperate to meet and talk with him, he goes back to the old theater. Meanwhile, some friends from the puppet show, a boy named Peter Hertz and his father, find André and decide to live with him after Peter's mother was arrested on charges of espionage. The next day, Toulon sends Six-Shooter to kill General Müller, the supervisor of the Nazi reanimation project, while Müller is visiting a brothel. Six-Shooter kills the general, but Müller shoots off one of the puppet's arms beforehand. Peter goes back to Toulon's old atelier to look for a replacement arm and is caught by Hess, who treats him kindly and gets him to take him to Toulon.

Hess finds and talks to Toulon, who tells him about the puppets' secret, and the two become friends. But Peter's father betrays Toulon by telling Major Kraus about his hideout in exchange for a pardon for his family. Kraus and his men storm the ruin, but the puppets fight back, enabling Toulon and Hess to escape. Kraus stops Peter and his father, demanding to know where Toulon is; Hertz fights against and is shot by Kraus. While searching the nearby houses, one of Kraus' men is shot by Six-Shooter; but when Hess approaches him, the soldier stabs him before expiring. Hess dies from the injury, telling Toulon to keep fighting. Toulon returns once more to his old theater, where he falls asleep from exhaustion and is soon joined by the now orphaned Peter.

At night, Kraus returns to his office, only to fall prey to an ambush by Toulon and his puppets, now joined by Blade, infused with Hess' essence. Toulon takes terrible revenge on Kraus by hanging him from the ceiling by his limbs and neck, which are impaled by sharp hooks. After having a halberd from Kraus' office decorations planted into the floor, point up, Toulon sets the rope on fire; the rope eventually snaps, and Kraus fatally falls right onto the halberd. The film ends with Toulon, posing as Kraus, and Peter leaving the country for Geneva on the express train.

== Cast ==
- Guy Rolfe as André Toulon
- Richard Lynch as Major Kraus
- Ian Abercrombie as Dr. Hess
- Kristopher Logan as Lieutenant Eric Stein
- Aron Eisenberg as Peter Hertz
- Walter Gotell as General Mueller
- Sarah Douglas as Elsa Toulon
- Matthew Faison as Hertz
- Michelle Bauer as Lili
- Jasmine Touschek as Prostitute
- Eduard Will as Soldier On Stage
- John Regis as Morgue Attendant
- Neal Parrow as Young Driver
- Kenneth Cortland as Pharmacy Soldier
- Lenny Rose as Train Station Agent
- Laurie Mateyko as Little Girl
- Rhonda Britten as Mother
- Michael Lowry as Hess Guard #1
- Michael Leroy Rhodes as Hess Guard #2
- John Cann as Young Dead Soldier
- Conrad Brooks as Nazi Soldier (uncredited)
- Gino Colbert as Morgue Worker (uncredited)
- Michael Deak as Nazi Soldier (uncredited)
- Landon Hall as Brothel Girl (uncredited)
- Kevin O'Hara as Nazi Soldier (uncredited)
- Ivan J. Rado as Cairo Merchant (archive footage)
- Michael Todd as Deathcore Zombie (uncredited)
- JD Walters as Nazi Soldier (uncredited)

=== Featured puppets ===
- Blade
- Pinhead
- Leech Woman
- Jester
- Tunneler
- Six-Shooter (voiced by Albert Band)
- Djinn the Homunculus (flashback)
- Mephisto (flashback)

== Production ==
=== Development ===
Executive producer Charles Band wanted a prequel to the original Puppet Master film set during World War II. He met C. Courtney Joyner, who had seen the film at a screening at the University of Southern California and was visiting the set of Puppet Master II. Joyner was asked to write the film's screenplay, as well as those of Doctor Mordrid and Trancers III, and wanted to make the film "the Where Eagles Dare of Puppet Master movies", though as author Nat Brehmer noted, "he wound up writing the Citizen Kane of Puppet Master movies instead." Director David DeCoteu liked the idea and wanted to make the film similar to Pinewood Studios' World War II films from the 1960s, particularly The Night of the Generals.

In this film, André Toulon escapes Berlin in April 1941. However, Toulon commits suicide on March 15, 1939 in the first installment, and this film mentions the Eastern Front, whose conduct of operations did not take place until the summer of 1941.

=== Filming ===
The Nazi Germany scenes were initially set to be filmed in Romania, but there was political instability in the country at the time, with Ted Nicolaou, who had finished shooting Subspecies there, advising DeCoteau to not travel there. The scenes were then planned to be shot in Hungary, but weather conditions during winter were judged too harsh for filming. The scenes were eventually shot on the Universal Studios Lot in 18 days. Band and distributor Paramount Pictures requested that the surgery scene in the film's opening sequence be toned down to make it less intense.

=== Casting ===
Band wanted a cast of European actors and actresses for the film. Actors and actresses cast for the film included Guy Rolfe, Ian Abercrombie, Kristopher Logan, Aron Eisenberg, Sarah Douglas, Matthew Faison, Michelle Bauer, Jasmine Touschek, Eduard Will, John Regis, Neal Parrow, Kenneth Cortland, Lenny Rose, Laurie Mateyko, Rhonda Britten, Michael Lowry, Michael Leroy Rhodes, John Cann, Conrad Brooks, Gino Colbert, Michael Deak, Landon Hall, Kevin O'Hara, Michael Todd, and JD Walters. Ralph Bates was offered to play the role of Major Kraus, but died of pancreatic cancer on 27 March 1991 shortly before production began. DeCoteau wanted Christopher Neame, who was friends with Bates, to play the role, but Band insisted on casting Richard Lynch instead, as he thought that having another European actor would convince the film's foreign distributors that it was not made in the United States and would "hurt [his] sales". Herbert Lom was considered for the role of General Mueller, but Walter Gotell was cast instead. The laughter of the puppet Six-Shooter was provided by Charles Band's father Albert Band, an actual escapee from the Nazi regime.

=== Special effects ===
The puppet effects and stop motion animation were done by David W. Allen, Kevin McCarthy, Mark Rappaport, Scott Oshita, Anthony Allen Barlow, Joanne Bloomfield, Yancy Calzada, Lynette Eklund, Chris Endicott, Paul Gentry, Dennis Gordon, Joseph Grossberg, Louis Gutierrez, Mark Killingsworth, Donna Littleford, Mark Sisson, Kirk Skodis, Lisa Sturz, John Teska, Brett B. White, and Steve Switaj at David Allen Productions. A six-armed ninja puppet holding multiple swords was originally created for an unmade film by Empire International Pictures. It was planned to appear in the original Puppet Master, but was cut since it would be too expensive to create. The concept would later be repurposed for Toulon's Revenge. Being a fan of Westerns, Joyner decided that one of André Toulon's puppets should represent the opposition toward the Third Reich, and changed the ninja into a cowboy named Six-Shooter. Graham Humpreys, who created the film's poster, used a 1988 Foot Soldier toy as a base for Six-Shooter. The film's opening sequence was planned to have a scene animated by Allen, where Six-Shooter's strings are cut and he comes to life, but it was cut due to time constraints. Stunts were coordinated by Chuck Borden and performed by John Cann, George B. Colucci Jr., Christopher Doyle, Lane Leavitt, Dennis Madalone, John Miller, Jon Conrad Pochron, and Tim Trella. The makeup effects were done by David P. Barton, Adam Brandy, Christl Colven, Thomas Floutz, Perry Fongheiser, Mark Garbarino, Palah Sandling, Yolanda Squatpump, Johnny Vegaline, and Scott Wheeler at Modus EFX.

== Reception ==
On Rotten Tomatoes, the film holds an approval rating of 0% based on two reviews, with a weighted average rating of 5.2/10. Author John Kenneth Muir gave the film three stars, stating, "Of all the Puppet Master movies, Toulon's Revenge is the best. It's not a great film, but one clever idea–a role reversal–grants the direct-to-video series new life and an injection of much-needed energy."

== Bibliography ==
- Brehmer, Nat (September 27, 2021). Puppet Master Complete: A Franchise History. McFarland Publishing. ISBN 978-1-476-67630-2.
