= Demonic Toys (film series) =

- Directed by: Peter Manoogian; Charles Band; Ted Nicolaou; William Butler
- Written by: David S. Goyer; Charles Band; Craig Hamann; C. Courtney Joyner; William Butler
- Produced by: Charles Band; Anne Kelly
- Production company: Full Moon Features
- Country: United States
- Language: English

Demonic Toys is a series of horror films that center on a collection of seemingly harmless playthings that are in reality the avatars of powerful demons from hell who seek to cause havoc in the mortal world.

Produced through Full Moon Features, the first film in the series, Demonic Toys, was released direct-to-video in 1992. It was followed by three additional films, all of which have crossovers with other Full Moon properties. The series has also led to a comic book series that was released through Full Moon Pictures and Eternity Comics, and a television spin-off series based on Baby Oopsie, which started airing on August 27, 2021. Season 2, titled Murder Dolls premiered on July 15, 2022. as well as other merchandise.

== Development ==
Full Moon Features, then Full Moon Entertainment, released the first film in the series, Demonic Toys, direct-to-video in 1992. Directed by Peter Manoogian, the script was written by David S. Goyer and featured a score by the composer, Richard Band. His brother, Charles Band served as one of the film's producers.

The following year, Full Moon Features released a follow-up, Dollman vs. Demonic Toys, which crosses over with the films Bad Channels and Dollman. Footage from the first Demonic Toys, as well as from Dollman and Bad Channels, were used in the creation of the movie.

In 2004, Full Moon Features released a third film, Puppet Master vs. Demonic Toys, which is a crossover with the Puppet Master series. The film was created as a made-for-TV movie for the SyFy Channel as a Christmas horror special. Filming took place in Bulgaria and had a limited budget.

In 2010, a direct sequel to the first film was released titled Demonic Toys: Personal Demons. Screenwriter and director William Butler has stated that the first rendition of the movie's script used Los Angeles, California as a setting. This was re-written to utilize Charles Band's castle in Italy and also include a character from Band's 1997 film Hideous!, Dr. Lorca. Most of the filming was completed in Italy and the remainder was shot in the United States, using a cavern set used in the television series, Weeds.

A television series, titled Baby Oopsie, premiered in August 2021 on the Full Moon Features App and on Amazon Prime Video, as a spin-off and semi-sequel of Demonic Toys 2. Though it was at first thought to be the fifth film in the series, the conflict was resolved when Full Moon uploaded a trailer for Season 2 on April 25, 2022.

== Films ==
Film	Date	Director	Writer(s)	Producer(s)
Demonic Toys	1992	Peter Manoogian	David S. Goyer	Charles Band; Anne Kelly
Dollman vs. Demonic Toys	1993	Charles Band	Craig Hamann; Charles Band	Charles Band
Puppet Master vs Demonic Toys	2004	Ted Nicolaou	C. Courtney Joyner	Alan Bursteen; Cary Glieberman
Demonic Toys 2	2010	William Butler	William Butler	Charles Band
Baby Oopsie	2021	William Butler	William Butler	Charles Band
Baby Oopsie 2: Murder Dolls	2022	William Butler	William Butler	Charles Band
Baby Oopsie 3: Burn Baby Burn	2022	William Butler	William Butler	Charles Band
Demonic Toys: Jack-Attack	2023	William Butler	William Butler	Charles Band

== Television series ==
Full Moon began airing a television series titled Baby Oopsie, based on the title character from the original films, The series follows a woman named Sybil, who is forced to cover up her tracks after unknowingly adopting a murderous and loudmouthed baby doll. The series premiered on August 27, 2021 on Full Moon's Streaming App and their Amazon Prime Video channel. Season 2 premiered in Summer 2022. Season 3, the third and final season premiered on November 4, 2022 just a few months after the end of the second season.

=== Season 1 (2021) ===
Episodes	First Aired	Director	Writer(s)
Chapter One	August 27, 2021	William Butler	William Butler
Chapter Two	September 3, 2021	William Butler	Charles Band

=== Season 2: Murder Dolls (2022) ===
Episodes	First Aired	Director	Writer(s)
Chapter One	July 15, 2022	William Butler	William Butler

=== Season 3: Burn Baby Burn (2022) ===
Episodes	First Aired	Director	Writer(s)
Chapter One	November 4, 2022	William Butler	William Butler

== Characters ==
=== Toys ===
- Baby Oopsie Daisy - Is a foul-mouthed, perverted baby doll in a similar manner to a Cabbage Patch Kid or other "baby" doll and leader of the toys.
- Jack Attack - Is a evil jack-in-the-box with a grotesque killer-clown face attached to it.
- Grizzly Teddy - Is a monstrous teddy bear.
- Mr. Static - Is a demonic toy robot in first film and Dollman vs. Demonic Toys with real shooting lasers and fire like a flamethrower.
- Zombietoid - Is a blond-haired G.I. Joe action figure in Dollman vs. Demonic Toys that makes a loud scream and kills people with his machete.
- Divoletto - Is a smiling, cloaked ancient toy demon doll in second film that makes a robotic ticking noise whenever he moves. He also makes a giggling sound now and then.
- Toy Soldier - Is a spirit of Judith Gray's unborn child in who possesses the toy soldier and protects her from the first film.

=== Humans ===
- The Master / The Kid - an extremely powerful and malevolent demon.
- Judith Gray - a female officer and the main protagonist of first film
- Brick Bardo / Dollman - the main protagonist of Dollman
- Nurse Ginger - a character from another Full Moon film Bad Channels.
- Sybil Pittman - a meek and mild mannered doll collector and the main protagonist of Baby Oopsie series
- Robert Toulon - the great grandnephew of Andre Toulon and the main protagonist of Puppet Master vs Demonic Toys.
- Alexandra Toulon - Robert's daughter in Puppet Master vs Demonic Toys.

== Comic book series ==
Demonic Toys: Play at Your Own Risk!

Publication information
- Publisher: Eternity Comics
- Format: Limited series
- Genre: Horror
- No. of issues: 4
- Main character(s): Jack Attack; Baby Oopsie Daisy; Grizzly Teddy; Mr. Static; Jack Norton/"The Kid"

Creative team
- Written by: Doug Campbell

Demonic Toys: Play at Your Own Risk! is a 1993 limited horror comic book series by Eternity Comics, based on the 1992 film of the same name.

A teaser poster for Demonic Toys was made with Grizzly Teddy and Jack Attack on it. The Jack Attack and Grizzly Teddy on the poster resembles the ones that appear in the comics. The comics take place 8 years after the first film; the Toys have drastically changed in appearance, Jack Attack is the most significant, and he has arms. The Toy Soldier is also aligned with the Toys.

=== Issues ===
- Play at Your Own Risk #1 (January 1993): Eight years after Officer Judith Grey survived the toy massacre at the Toyland Warehouse, the demon child known as "The Kid" attempts another birth through a human infant.
- Play at Your Own Risk #2 (February 1993): "Toyland" is changed to "Arcadia Toy Company", and now run by Jack Norton and assistant Mr. Horse. The factory is torn down and replaced with a high-tech skyscraper. But evil still exists beneath them. Mr. Horse hires some thugs while Jack unveils the new skyscraper.
- Play at Your Own Risk #3 (April 1993): While out, Jack discovers Baby Oopsie Daisy, who kills him. His body is taken over by The Kid, who tries to dictate a policy for the largest toy producing company in the world. But Grey's son, Matthew, now 8 years old, has suspicions about Jack.
- Play at Your Own Risk #4 (August 1993): Arcadia employee Dapne meets Jack, who, when he discovers her pregnancy, decides to keep her for it.

=== Dollman Kills the Full Moon Universe ===
Dollman Kills the Full Moon Universe is a comic series based on the Dollman film series released from August 2018 to January 2019. The first issue is a callback to Dollman vs Demonic Toys, making it the second time the character has gone against the demonic toys.

== Video game ==
On Halloween 2023, the Demonic Toys cast became playable DLC characters in Puppet Master: The Game.

== Merchandising ==
- A resin statue of Jack Attack was released in 2015, as part of Full Moons replica series.
- A replica prop of Baby Oopsie from the spin off tv series was released in 2023 as part of Full Moons replica series.
- Prototype action figures of Baby Oopsy Daisy, Jack Attack and Grizzly Teddy were shown at Toy Fair 2000 but ultimately went unproduced.

== Reception ==
The first film in the series, Demonic Toys, received a predominantly negative reception upon release. A reviewer for TV Guide criticized it as "a rehash of the company's Puppet Master series".

The second film, Dollman vs. Demonic Toys, was panned by Dennis Fischer in his book covering science fiction directors as "one of Band's worst missteps". A reviewer for Billboard was more favorable, writing that "Good-humored viewers will enjoy this silly but fast-moving quickie."

Critic Scott Weinberg wrote a negative review for the third film on DVD Talk, writing that it was "not funny, it's not scary, and it's certainly not a worthwhile way to spend 90 minutes of the time you're given on this planet." Director Ted Nicolaou was critical of Puppet Master vs. Demonic Toys in a 2017 interview with Video Fugue, as he felt that it was "kind of a big mistake, I think, in a lot of ways".

Steve Barton, writing for Dread Central, reviewed Demonic Toys 2, stating that "While I find myself neither enjoying nor hating the return of the Demonic Toys, it was the film’s irritating, repetitive score that soured me more than anything else."

Horror Society reviewed Baby Oopsie and rated it a 3/5, stating "the film makes good use of practical effects and beautiful puppets. We get some bloody kills that sometimes happen off screen or was only in frame for a quick second but they did deliver some fun practical effects that you would expect from Full Moon. Overall, Baby Oopsie was a lot of fun and the movie I didn’t know I needed. It was very enjoyable and I look forward to where this story is going to take me next."

== Releases ==
The Demonic Toys series has been predominantly released direct-to-video with the exception of the 2004 Puppet Master vs. Demonic Toys, which premiered on the SyFy Channel in 2004 before it was released to DVD on January 17, 2006.

== See also ==
- Killer toy
