= Demonic Toys 2 =

Demonic Toys 2: Personal Demons
- Release poster
- Directed by: William Butler
- Written by: William Butler
- Produced by: Charles Band
- Starring: Selene Luna; Elizabeth Bell; Leslie Jordan
- Cinematography: Thomas L. Callaway
- Edited by: Danny Draven
- Music by: Richard Band; Kenny Meriedeth
- Distributed by: Full Moon Features; Trainsition Entertainment
- Release date: January 26, 2010
- Running time: 80 minutes
- Country: United States
- Language: English

Demonic Toys 2 (also known as Demonic Toys: Personal Demons) is a 2010 American horror comedy slasher film written and directed by William Butler and produced by Charles Band. It is a slasher film featuring killer dolls. It is technically the fourth film featuring the evil ‘Demonic Toys’ in the Demonic Toys film franchise. It follows two previous crossover films that expanded lore into both the Dollman universe, with 1993’s Dollman vs. Demonic Toys and the Puppet Master franchise with 2004’s Puppet Master vs Demonic Toys. It is the official direct sequel to the 1992 original classic, Demonic Toys. A third sequel/ or fifth spin-off, Baby Oopsie was released in 2021.

== Plot ==
Taking place right after the events of Demonic Toys, an unknown stranger with a pair of gloved hands picks up the pieces of the destroyed toys and starts stitching them together. The only toys the perpetrator could fix correctly were Baby Oopsie Daisy and Jack Attack. The unidentified man puts the toys into a crate and is handed a suitcase full of cash by another man, who then leaves with the toys. The man is revealed to be Dr. Lorca, with his wife, Lauraline, and her stepson, David and a little woman named Lillith, who is a psychic of some sorts. Dr. Lorca's driver, Eric, accidentally drops a crate that Dr. Lorca wants brought into the house, revealing the Demonic Toys inside it. It is revealed that Dr. Lorca is collecting oddity toys, he had arrived because Caitlin called and told him about an oddity toy she found within the castle that is able to move.

The castle's current owners seldom come there, as they are superstitious about everything that has happened there. The owners decided to empty and sell it to the Italian government to make it a historical landmark and keep it open for the public. Caitlin takes them inside the castle and gives them its history. Caitlin opens the box and shows them the doll, Divoletto. The doll itself was hand carved out of wood with a mixture of fabric elements. Mr. Butterfield examines the toy and claims it is the oldest toy he's ever seen, made possibly in the 14th century. Caitlin shows them how it moves; just tap a wand on the side of the box a couple of times and then it will come to life. After a while, the toy finally moves. Caitlin believes that there are magnets in the wand and when the box is tapped, it sets off the springs and mechanisms inside of Divoletto. However, Lillith thinks differently. Eric suddenly runs into the room and tells them that their cars are gone. Since everything is closed and they have no transportation to get back to Rome, Caitlin suggests that they stay at the castle for the night. Meanwhile, Lillith examines Divoletto to catch a vision of some sorts and sees a vision of the future where Divoletto kills them all.

David then smashes Divoletto's head with a shovel, but it is revealed that Divoletto was one of Fiora's personal demons. The demon then sucks Fiora's spirit out of Lillith and brings her through the portal back to hell. The demonic toys then attack them, and David cuts their heads off with the shovel, killing them. The next day, David, Caitlin and a spooked-out Lillith leave the castle, with the toys staying so no one else can find them, along with the clay vessels containing Fiora's personal demons. The sound of glass shattering is heard, and the painting of Fiora at the castle starts whispering, implying that Fiora's revenge personal demon has been released.

== Cast ==
- Alli Kinzel as Caitlin
- Lane Compton as David
- Selene Luna as Lilith
- Michael Citriniti as Dr. Lorca
- Elizabeth Bell as Lauraline
- Billy Marquart as Eric
- Leslie Jordan as Butterfield
- Gage Hubbard as Personal Demon
- Jane Wiedlin as Baby Oopsie Daisy

== Production ==
The film was initially going to be set in Los Angeles, California. The script was later rewritten to include the character Dr. Lorca from Hideous! as well as utilize Charles Band's castle in Italy.

Most of the film was shot in Italy, with some portions filmed in the United States, reusing sets from the tv series Weeds.

The painting of Fiora also appears in Full Moon movie Stuart Gordon's Castle Freak

== Release ==
The film was released on DVD in January 2010. The film was released on Blu-ray for the first time on November 6, 2024, exclusively in Australia by Umbrella Entertainment, as part of a collection called Full Moon Fright Box Vol. 1, which includes Dollman, Demonic Toys, Dollman vs. Demonic Toys, and Demonic Toys 2.

== Reception ==
Dread Central reviewed Demonic Toys 2, stating that "While I find myself neither enjoying nor hating the return of the Demonic Toys, it was the film’s irritating, repetitive score that soured me more than anything else."

== See also ==
- List of toys in the Demonic Toys films
