= The Killer Eye =

- Release poster
- Directed by: David DeCoteau
- Written by: Benjamin Carr
- Produced by: Sky Sharp
- Starring: David Oren Ward; Jacqueline Lovell
- Cinematography: Howard Wexler
- Edited by: William Marrinson
- Music by: Carl Dante
- Production company: Full Moon Entertainment
- Distributed by: The Kushner-Locke Company
- Release date: January 18, 1999
- Running time: 72 minutes
- Country: United States
- Language: English

The Killer Eye is a 1999 American science fiction horror film and monster movie, directed by David DeCoteau under the pseudonym of Richard Chasen. The film was released on January 18, 1999 through Full Moon Features and was followed by a 2011 sequel, Killer Eye: Halloween Haunt. It stars Jonathan Norman as a mad scientist who unwittingly unleashes a killer eyeball upon the world.

== Plot ==
Dr. Jordan Grady hires a kid off the street, Japlo, to participate in an experiment. He administers special eye drops to Japlo in an attempt to allow him to see into the eighth dimension. During the test, Jordan is confronted by his wife Rita about his neglect of her and while he is away, Japlo's eye is possessed by a creature from the eighth dimension, killing him. Rita goes next door to have sex with her neighbors, Joe and Tom, while Jordan finds Japlo's body. Jordan demands that his employee Morton help him, ruining Morton's date with his wife Jane.

Japlo's eye has morphed into a massive monster that rapes Rita and Jane. Jordan and Morton put Japlo's body in the attic, and the body is found by Jordan's other employee Bill. Jordan and Morton hunt for the eye, and both Morton and Jane are hypnotized by the eye in their bedroom. Morton partly undresses Jane and himself and lays her out on the bed for the eye, which violates her while he eagerly watches and masturbates. However, Morton accidentally knocks over a lamp behind him which shines a light into the eye; it is hurt and runs away, snapping the couple out of their trances. Jordan, Rita, Bill and Morton regroup and realize that light weakens the eye. Jordan hypothesizes that because the monster has been deprived of brain matter, the eye requires regular contact with a brain, which explains the victims' wounds. He also states that the eye could be harmed by shining bright light into it, just like a normal-sized human eye. However, the eye possesses Joe and causes him to sexually assault Jane, but he suddenly dies due to having his brain matter drained by the eye.

The building's lights go off due to a power outage, so the group turns on a backup generator to power lights in their efforts against the eye. The eye attacks Rita when she gets separated from the others. Jordan appears, revealing that he wants to help the eye because it is advanced and intelligent. Rita manages to escape before she can be consumed, but Tom and Bill are murdered by the eye. Morton is able to trap the eye and forces it to go back home, but Jordan follows it back to the eighth dimension. Rita, Morton, and Jane think they are safe, but Rita and Jane feel sudden abdominal pain, implying that they were impregnated by the eye and ending the film on a cliffhanger.

== Cast ==
- Jacqueline Lovell as Rita Grady
- Jonathan Norman as Dr. Jordan Grady
- Nanette Bianchi as Jane
- Costas Koromilas as Morton
- Blake Adams as Bill "Creepy Bill" (credited as Blake Bailey)
- Ryan Van Steenis as Japlo
- David Oren Ward as Tom
- Roland Martinez as Joe

== Release ==
The Killer Eye was released direct to video on VHS in 1999 with both R-rated and unrated versions. The film was released on DVD for the first time in December 2003. The unrated edition VHS includes an exclusive behind-the-scenes featurette that was not included on the DVD.

== Reception ==
The A.V. Club gave a mixed review, writing "for all of The Killer Eye's faults, hardly anyone other than Full Moon Features, the studio behind the Puppet Master and Subspecies series, knows how to churn out cut-rate monster movies these days. And if that's your pleasure, excessively creepy sex scenes aside, you might enjoy The Killer Eye." In his 2010 book 150 Movies You Should Die Before You See, author Steve Miller panned The Killer Eye and stated "Nothing works in this picture, from the poorly structured story to the sparsely decorated sets."

A review in TV Guide wrote, "A ramshackle production even by the standards of Charles Band's low-rent Full Moon company. (...) The effects are tacky; the killer eye's world is represented by a single static painting; and the actors do what they can with their one-dimensional characters (which in Bailey's case involves a poor man's impression of Michael Keaton in 1988's Beetlejuice). Lovell and Bianchi look lovely in their copious nude scenes, which might seem gratuitous if everything else in Killer Eye weren't equally pointless."

== Sequel ==
A sequel was released in 2011 titled Killer Eye: Halloween Haunt.

== Other media ==
The Killer Eye appears in the fifth issue of Dollman Kills the Full Moon Universe, a crossover comic featuring Brick Bardo from Dollman tracking down different Full Moon monsters and villains to kill, published by Full Moon Comix in 2018.
