= Hideous =

Hideous may refer to:

- Ugliness
- Hideous (liqueur)
- Hideous!, a 1997 film directed by Charles Band
- Hideous (short film), 2022
