= List of films featuring miniature people =

There is a body of films that feature miniature people. The concept of a human shrinking in size has existed since the beginning of cinema, with early films using camera techniques to change perceptions of human sizes. The earliest film to have a shrunken person was a 1901 short The Dwarf and the Giant by Georges Méliès in which a character was split into two, with one growing in size and the other shrinking. Before digital effects became commonplace, composite screens were used to create the illusion of miniature people. The element appeared in numerous B movies. James Luxford, writing for the British Film Institute, said, "Each era has used the scenario for very different purposes, in ways that often reflect the anxieties of the time." He added, "The reason shrinking characters have been so popular in films is that they enable the viewer to see the world in a different way."

Don Kaye, writing for Den of Geek, said, "The 'shrinking person' genre got its start in the early ‘30s, with nearly each decade since then offering up its own variation on the theme. Some have been frightening, some humorous, and others just plain ludicrous -- but all tap into that deep-seated fear of being diminished in a world that looms too large around us." In the 1960s, Fantastic Voyage featured miniature people, but no major film revisited the concept until the 1980s. Grantland's Claire L. Evans said in 2015, "The conceit, being inherently silly, was reframed as a vehicle for broad physical comedies and family movies." She said, "These kinds of films reframe domestic life—a bowl of cereal, the family cat—as a cinematic landscape of awe and terror as exotic as anything on an alien world."

== List of films ==
Film	Year(s)	Description
The 3 Worlds of Gulliver	1960	The US fantasy film is an adaptation of the 18th-century novel Gulliver's Travels, and features a voyage during which Dr. Gulliver is perceived as a giant by the small Lilliputian people, and is later perceived as small by the giant Brobdingnagian people. The special effects for the different sizes were created by Ray Harryhausen.
The 7th Voyage of Sinbad	1958	The US fantasy film features the hero Sinbad the Sailor and his ship's crew. In the film, a magician shrinks a princess and provokes her father into declaring war.
Alice in Wonderland	1903	The British silent film, the first film adaptation of the 19th-century novel Alice's Adventures in Wonderland, features Alice drinking a liquid to shrink and fit through a door. The shrinking effect is thought to have been accomplished through manipulating lenses.
Alice in Wonderland	1951	The US animated film, based on the 19th-century novel Alice's Adventures in Wonderland, features Alice shrinking down and later growing again.
Alice in Wonderland	2010	The US fantasy film, based on the 19th-century novel Alice's Adventures in Wonderland, features Alice shrinking and also growing larger in the course of the story.
Amour de poche (English: Girl in his Pocket)	1957	The French comedy fantasy film features a scientist who shrinks his assistant to 3.0 inches (7.6 cm) tall.
The Ant Bully	2006	The animated family film features a boy who is shrunken down by ants to their size after he keeps attacking their colony.
Ant-Man	2015	The US superhero film features Ant-Man, who has the ability to shrink down (and grow) from his normal human form.
Ant-Man and the Wasp	2018	The US superhero film features Ant-Man and the Wasp, who have the ability to shrink down (and grow) from their normal human forms.
Ant-Man and the Wasp: Quantumania	2023	The US superhero film features Ant-Man and the Wasp, who have the ability to shrink down (and grow) from their normal human forms.
Arrietty	2010	The Japanese animated film, based on a children's novel The Borrowers by Mary Norton, features a family of tiny people called Borrowers living secretly in a house, borrowing items from humans to survive, who are then discovered by a young boy.
Army of Darkness	1992	The US horror comedy film features a protagonist whose reflection in a mirror is shattered, resulting in multiple tiny figures coming out of each shard.
Arthur and the Minimoys	2006	The live action and animated film, features a boy getting shrunken down to join a people of elves to find his grandfather and battle an evil ruler.
Attack of the Puppet People	1958	The US science-fiction horror film features a character who runs a doll factory and is revealed to have been shrinking down humans to the size of dolls.
Barbie in the Nutcracker	2001	The animated film features the toy-based character Barbie, who tells the story of "The Nutcracker and the Mouse King" to her younger sister, in which the Mouse King shrinks down a girl who tries to help the Nutcracker fight against the mouse army.
Beetlejuice	1988	In this US horror-comedy, Beetlejuice is first seen as the same size of human models in Adam's model of the town. Later, during the climax, he shrinks Adam down to the size of his models, but when he's defeated, Adam returns to normal.
The Big Lebowski	1998	In the English-language comedy film, a dream sequence features the protagonist in a shrunken size and running away from a bowling ball.
Big Top Pee-wee	1988	The film features Midge Montana, the tiny wife of circus leader Mace Montana
The Borrowers	1973	The US fantasy film, based on a British children's novel of the same name by Mary Norton, features a family of tiny people called Borrowers living secretly in a house, borrowing items from humans to survive, who are then discovered by a young boy.
The Borrowers	1997	The US/British fantasy film, based on a British children's novel of the same name by Mary Norton, features a family of tiny people called Borrowers living secretly in a house, borrowing items from humans to survive, who are then discovered by a young boy.
The Borrowers	2011	The British fantasy film, based on a children's novel of the same name by Mary Norton, features a family of tiny people called Borrowers living secretly in a house, borrowing items from humans to survive, who are then discovered by a young boy.
Bride of Frankenstein	1935	In the US science-fiction horror film, Doctor Septimus Pretorius reveals to Baron Henry Frankenstein his collection of homunculi contained in bell jars.
Captain America: Civil War	2016	The superhero film features a variety of superheroes, including the shrinking superhero Ant-Man aiding Captain America and his team.
Charlie and the Chocolate Factory	2005	In the English-language fantasy film based on the 1964 British novel of the same name, one of the children who won a ticket to tour a chocolate factory accidentally shrinks himself when using a teleporter on himself.
Darby O'Gill and the Little People	1959	The US fantasy film features leprechauns who are smaller than the humans. Forced perspective was used to depict the difference in size; lights were used abundantly on sets to put everything in focus.
The Devil-Doll	1936	In the US horror film, an escaped convict creates two tiny assassins to kill business associates who had betrayed him.
Dollman	1991	The US science-fiction film features a space cop who is teleported to Earth and shrunken down to 13 inches (33 cm) tall.
Dollman vs. Demonic Toys	1993	The US horror film, a continuation of Dollman (1991), features a miniature-sized space cop who fights against toys possessed with evil.
Downsizing	2017	In the US satire film set in the future, humans are able to be "downsized" (shrunken) to 5 inches (13 cm) tall as a way to solve overpopulation and environmental dangers and to live a more opulent lifestyle.
Dr. Cyclops	1940	The US science-fiction horror film features a biologist who shrinks down visitors who had come to his laboratory in the Amazon jungle, and they escape from him into the jungle.
The Dwarf and the Giant	1901	The silent film by Georges Méliès is the earliest known to depict a person being shrunken down. Special effects were used to split an actor into two figures, one that shrunk down and one that grew larger.
Epic	2013	In the animated fantasy adventure film, one of the main protagonists is shrunken down to help a group of little people, known as the Leafmen, prevent their forest home from being destroyed.
Fantastic Voyage	1966	The US science-fiction film features a submarine crew that is shrunken down to microscopic size and placed inside a comatose scientist's body to destroy a blood clot and revive him.
FernGully: The Last Rainforest	1992	FernGully is set in an Australian rainforest inhabited by fairies, including Crysta, who accidentally shrinks a young logger named Zak to the size of a fairy. Together, they rally the fairies and the animals of the rainforest to protect their home from the loggers and Hexxus, a malevolent pollution entity.
Großer Mann ganz klein!	2013	This German romantic comedy features the egoistic boss of a toy company who gets shrunk to action figure size by a cursed fish, and has to be taken care of by his shy secretary (and eventually falls in love with her).
Gullivers Travels	1939	The US animated film is an adaptation of the 18th-century novel Gulliver's Travels and features Gulliver stranded on an island occupied by tiny people.
Gulliver's Travels	2010	The US fantasy film is an adaptation of the 18th-century novel Gulliver's Travels and features a voyage during which Gulliver is perceived as a giant by the small Lilliputian people and is later perceived as small by the giant Brobdingnagian people.
Gulliver's Travels Among the Lilliputians and the Giants	1902	Another Georges Méliès' film, this one based on Jonathan Swift's 1726 novel Gulliver's Travels.
Help!	1965	In the British musical film featuring the Beatles, Paul McCartney shrinks to a nearly invisible size after accidentally being injected with a shrinking serum. He later returns to his normal size when the serum wears off.
Help, I Shrunk My Teacher	2015	In this German children's fantasy film, 11-year-old Felix accidentally shrinks his school's hated headmistress to 6 inches tall.
Help, I Shrunk My Parents	2018	In the sequel, Felix accidentally shrinks his parents.
Help, I Shrunk My Friends	2021	In the third part, Felix accidentally shrinks his classmates.
Help, I've Shrunk The Family	2014	A young boy meets a tiny magical man named Wiplala, who accidentally shrinks the boy and his family to four inches tall.
Honey, I Blew Up the Kid	1992	A sequel to Honey, I Shrunk the Kids (1989), the US comedy film sees an inventor's child growing giant. In order to bring him back to normal size, the inventor has to use his shrink ray. He tests it on some policemen before using it on his son, not knowing that his other son was in the baby's pocket at the time of shrinking him back to normal.
Honey, I Shrunk the Kids	1989	The US comedy film, set in suburbia, features kids who accidentally shrink themselves with an inventor's experimental shrink ray to be a quarter-inch tall and must survive the indoors and the outdoors on a different scale.
Honey, We Shrunk Ourselves	1997	A sequel to Honey, I Shrunk the Kids (1989), the US comedy film features the inventor accidentally shrinking himself and three others. They have to get the attention of the kids who think they are home alone.
Hook	1991	In the US fantasy film, one of the side characters is the palm-sized fairy Tinker Bell played by Julia Roberts. Composites and blue-screen technology were used to depict the fairy as smaller than the others.
The Incredible Shrinking Man	1957	The US science-fiction horror film features a man who is exposed to a radioactive cloud while on a boating trip. Over time, he begins shrinking and tries to find a cure, but at the same time, he becomes a phenomenon throughout the country.
The Incredible Shrinking Woman	1981	The US science-fiction comedy film features a housewife who accidentally ingests experimental household-product chemicals and begins shrinking. She becomes a media sensation and also the target of a company that wants to use her shrinking nature for evil.
The Indian in the Cupboard	1995	The US family film, based on the 1980 children's novel of the same name, features a magical cupboard that brings to life toy figures that the new boy owner puts into it.
Innerspace	1987	The US science-fiction comedy film features a naval aviator who volunteers to be shrunken by miniaturization technology and inserted into the body of a rabbit test subject. Instead, after shrinking, he is accidentally injected into a hypochondriac's body. He is pursued by those who also want the technology.
Island of Rusty General	1988	The Soviet children's science fiction film directed by Valentin Khovenko, based on the Island of the Rusted Lieutenant from the short story collection Adventures of Alisa by Kir Bulychov. In one episode, the robots are reduced (using technology discovered by a female scientist) to the size of toy soldiers in order to carry out an invasion.
Jimmy Neutron: Boy Genius	2001	In the animated sci-fi comedy, Jimmy tries to use his shrink ray on his archrival Cindy, but it doesn't work. When he leaves the classroom, he accidentally shrinks his teacher. Later on, he shrinks himself to sneak out, having been barred from going to a new amusement park.
Kingsajz	1988	In the famous classic Polish comedy, the legendary ancient miniature tribes of krasnoludki have evolved to modern times, and are dreaming of increasing their sizes to the titular kingsajz / kingsize, so that they can enter the human world, which they consider to be an idealized paradise. However, political corruption has seized their tiny land, and it is up to two unlikely heroes to bring salvation to the small masses under the rallying cry of Kingsajz dla każdego! (Kingsize for all!) and by the surprising means of the popular human soft drink Polo-Cockta.
Leapin' Leprechauns!	1995	In this US family fantasy film, the protagonist and his family try to prevent the building of a theme park on top of a land that is home to the Leprechauns.
The Luck of the Irish	2001	In this Disney Channel Original Movie, a half leprechaun boy named Kyle Johnson has a nightmare that he's the size of a leprechaun. Later on, his family's lucky coin gets stolen from him and results in his mother's family line, the O'Reilly clan, shrinking into their natural leprechaun forms as well as himself but slower due to his mixed heritage. His mother is the first one shown to shrink to natural leprechaun form. After defeating Seamus, the person who stole the coin in the first place, the latter is shrunken and banished to Lake Erie.
The Magical Legend of the Leprechauns	1999	In this Hallmark Entertainment original movie, an American businessman travels to Ireland where he encounters a family of Leprechauns and takes part in a war between the Leprechauns and the (equally tiny) Fairies.
Mars Attacks!	1996	In the science-fiction comedy film, a human general confronting a Martian invader is shrunken down and subsequently stepped on and crushed by the invader's foot.
Meet Dave	2008	A spaceship designed like a human male comes to earth and is crewed by tiny aliens that look exactly like humans.
Mothra	1961	In this fantastic Japanese tokusatsu film, twin women a foot tall, dubbed the Shobijin, are kidnapped from their island and their goddess, Mothra, goes to rescue them. Subsequent films with the character Mothra typically feature the Shobijin, or a variation of them.
Mulholland Drive	2001	In the US neo-noir mystery film, one of the main characters meets an elderly couple on a plane who later reappear in her nightmare as tiny figures.
My Favorite Martian	1999	In the feature film adaptation of the 1960s sitcom of the same name, Uncle Martin is capable to shrink his spaceship and other vehicles (as well as the people inside) to a miniature size.
Night at the Museum film trilogy	2006–2014	The US fantasy-comedy films feature elements of the American Museum of Natural History that come to life, including small figurines that become human.
The Pee Pee Poo Poo Man	2024	The central character, Miguel – a paranoid man who uses psychedelic drugs and experiences delusions – perceives a tiny naked man born from his mouth in the final minutes of the film.
Pinocchio and the Emperor of the Night	1987	The main villain of the film, Puppetino, shrinks Gepetto to fit inside a jewelry box.
The Phantom Planet	1961	The US science-fiction film features astronauts who are forced to land on an asteroid and discover a humanoid species only six inches (15 cm) tall. The surviving astronaut is subsequently shrunk down to their size and is forced to deal with them.
Samurai Kids	1993	A Japanese kids' fantasy film featuring a miniature samurai named Sutonahiko Suminoe, who is discovered by a young boy named Satoru.
Spellbreaker: Secret of the Leprechauns	1996	In the sequel to Leapin' Leprechauns!, the young boy, Mickey travels to Ireland and has further adventures with the Leprechauns.
The Shrinking Man	2025	A French adaptation of The Shrinking Man
The Super Mario Bros. Movie	2023	The US animated action-adventure film features the Mini Mushroom, which shrinks anyone who eats it. Mario eats it originally, but is returned to his original size after being hit. After the villain of the film, Bowser, is defeated, he is shrunk using the Mini Mushroom, and kept in a cage by Princess Peach.
The Super Mario Galaxy Movie	2026	A sequel to The Super Mario Bros. Movie (2023), the US animated action-adventure film sees a still miniature Bowser given his own tiny castle. Later on, in the Honeyhive Galaxy, he is brought back to normal size after Mario stomps on him.
Sweet Taste of Souls	2020	A traveling band is trapped in picture frames of a mad cafe owner.
Tiny Christmas	2017	Two distant cousins are gearing up for Christmas Day, when one of Santa's elves accidentally shrinks them.
Tom Thumb	1958	The US musical fantasy film is an adaptation of the fairy tale "Thumbling" and features a tiny boy who is created as a result of a wood-dwelling couple's wishes. The boy eventually gets caught up with human-sized thieves who want to use his size to their advantage.
Tooth Fairy	2010	The English-language comedy film features a hockey player who is forced to work as a tooth fairy. One of the tools available to the fairy is shrinking paste, which is used in the film.
Wild, Wild Planet	1966	The Italian science-fiction horror film features a mad scientist who sends bald mutants to kidnap humans and shrink them down to be carried back in suitcases.
Willow	1988	The US fantasy film features Brownies, which stand only inches tall.
Willy Wonka & the Chocolate Factory	1971	A character, Mike Teavee, observes Willy Wonka's 'Wonkavision' shrinking down a chocolate bar and transferring the bar into a television set. After observing this, Mike runs into the 'Wonkavision' and demands to be shrunk down to fulfill his desire to be on TV. From this, he ends up being shrunk down to a 12th of his size.
The World's Greatest Athlete	1973	In this slapstick comedy, an aside has the witch doctor Gazenga temporarily shrinking assistant coach Milo Jackson (Tim Conway) to a few inches tall, in a cocktail lounge. Milo dodges being sat upon by a woman, escapes from her handbag, and struggles with a gigantic telephone to call for help.

== See also ==
- The Lord of the Rings film trilogy (2001–2003), which used similar techniques to portray some actors as Hobbits at a height of two to four feet (0.6 to 1.2 m) tall

TV series featuring miniature people:

- World of Giants (1959)
- Land of the Giants (1968–1970)
- The Minikins (1981-1982)
- Honey, I Shrunk the Kids: The TV Show (1997–2000): Happens in the episodes "Honey, We've Been Swallowed by Grandpa", "Honey, I Shrunk the Science Dude", and "Honey, I Shrink, Therefore I Am"
- I'm A Virgo (2023): Starting with the episode "Brillo, If Possible", the entire neighborhood of the Lower Bottoms is shrunk to a few inches tall.
- Tales from the Cryptkeeper (1993): In the episode "Nature", two kids are shrunken to the size of insects.
- Team Umizoomi (2010-2015)
- Wizards of Waverly Place (2009): In the episode "Doll House", Alex shrinks herself into her dollhouse, which is then given away to a young girl who thinks Alex is a doll.
- Hawkeye (2021): While facing off against the Tracksuit Mafia, Kate Bishop uses an arrow that shrinks down a van with people from the Mafia inside. It is later carried away by an owl.
- Solar Opposites (2020-2025): The aliens shrink regular people into miniature size as they put them in "The Wall".
- The Miniature Wife (2026): A man accidentally shrinks his wife, causing their power dynamics to change. Several others are shrunken down as well, including the man's coworker, a news reporter, and the man himself.
- The Adventures of Jimmy Neutron, Boy Genius (2002-06): In the episode titled "The Incredible Shrinking Town", everyone in the titular town is shrunk when Jimmy's gym teacher accidentally hits the shrink ray.
- Strawberry Shortcake's Berry Bitty Adventures (2010-15): In the episode titled "Trading Sizes", Strawberry and her friends are accidentally shrunk to an even smaller size than they already were.
- My Little Pony: Friendship is Magic (2010-19): In the episode titled "Bridle Gossip", Applejack is shrunk after coming across plants called "Poison Jokes".
