= Head of the Family =

- Release poster
- Directed by: Charles Band (as Robert Talbot)
- Screenplay by: Benjamin Carr
- Produced by: Charles Band; Kirk Edward Hansen
- Starring: Blake Adams; Jacqueline Lovell; J.W. Perra; Bob Schott; Alexandria Quinn
- Cinematography: Adolfo Bartoli
- Edited by: Poppy Das Lazar Djokic Steven Nielson
- Music by: Richard Band; Steven Morell
- Production companies: Full Moon Entertainment; Tanna Productions
- Distributed by: The Kushner-Locke Company
- Release date: November 29, 1996; (USA video premiere)
- Running time: 82 minutes
- Country: United States
- Language: English

Head of the Family is an American 1996 B movie black comedy released by Full Moon Features. It concerns a Southern couple who blackmail a family of mutants to get money and revenge.

A sequel, Head of the Family 2: Sirens of Seduction, followed in 2026.

== Plot ==
Howard is the meanest nastiest thug in town, a Harley riding criminal with an attractive wife named Loretta. Loretta's problem is that she is having an affair with Lance, owner of the town diner and Howard is getting suspicious.

Driving back from one of their nightly flings, Lance witnesses the local family of weirdos, the Stackpools, dragging a man from his truck and into their house. Seeing this as an opportunity, Lance discovers the Stackpools' terrible secret. They are quadruplets, and each was born with one exaggerated human faculty: One is extremely strong, one has extremely well-developed senses, one is extremely attractive, and one is extremely intelligent. The whole family is run by the intelligent one, the titular "head of the family": Myron. Little more than a giant head with hands in a wheelchair, Myron psychically controls his other siblings, but seeks more. When idiotic locals fall for his trap, he experiments on their brains, trying to find a normal body to house his superior intellect.

Lance blackmails the Stackpools with their secret, getting them to kill Howard. He also demands $2,000 a week in cash, since the Stackpools are rich in oil and coal, among other things. Eventually Myron tires of Lance's bottom-feeding, and captures him and Loretta, to get them to destroy the evidence of their secret. To force Lance's hand, he puts Loretta in a mock play of Joan of Arc in the basement, stripping her naked and complete with a burning at the stake. Otis, seeing the "pretty girl" in trouble, carries her off before she can be hurt, and burns the house down. With the Stackpools and Lance dead, the ever scheming Loretta realizes that Otis Stackpool, as the sole survivor, is heir to the family riches. She marries him, inheriting all the Stackpool fortunes and becoming Loretta Stackpool. The ending, however, suggests that Myron is still alive and is controlling Otis from the shadows.

== Cast ==
- Blake Adams as Lance
- Jacqueline Lovell as Loretta
- J.W. Perra as Myron
- Bob Schott as Otis
- Alexandria Quinn as Ernestina
- Gordon Jennison Noice as Howard
- James Jones as Wheeler

== Release ==
Head of the Family was released direct to video on VHS in 1996. The film was released on DVD in 1999 and Blu-ray in 2016.

A black and white version of the film was released on June 7, 2025.

== Sequel ==
Plans for a sequel titled Bride of the Head of Family date back to as early as 1997, when Charles Band first mentioned it in the Videozone for The Creeps. stating that it was intended as Full Moon's next release before Curse of the Puppet Master. This project never materialized.

In 2012, Charles Band rerevealed the sequel in Puppet Master X: Axis Rising's VideoZone, stating that Full Moon had plans to produce it the following year. The film did not make this estimated production date. Promotional material for a new version of Bride of the Head of Family was released on February 14, 2020. This was promoted as a part of the Deadly Ten series and was set to be directed by Charles Band. The plot of the film was supposed to follow the events of the previous film. This project also never materialized.

A real sequel titled Head of the Family 2: Sirens of Seduction, was released in 2026.

== Other media ==
Myron Stackpoole appears in the first issue of Dollman Kills the Full Moon Universe, a crossover comic featuring Brick Bardo from Dollman tracking down different Full Moon monsters and villains to kill, published by Full Moon Comix in 2018.

A tie-in comic for the unproduced sequel titled Deadly Ten Presents: Bride of the Head of the Family, was published by Full Moon Comix in 2020.
