= Korzeniacy, czyli Jesień wsamrazków =

Fantasy novel by Janina Wieczerska

- Author: Janina Wieczerska
- Language: Polish
- Genre: fantasy novel (modern fairy tale) for young adults
- Publisher: Czytelnik Publishing House
- Publication date: 1989
- Publication place: Poland

Korzeniacy, czyli Jesień wsamrazków ('The Root People, or Autumn of the Little Gnomes') is a fantasy novel (modern fairy tale) for young readers by Janina Wieczerska, published in 1989. It has an eco-friendly theme and tells the adventures of gnomes in contemporary times.

The main characters are dwarves-sprites, called wsamrazki or Rorzeniaki: the eldest, Niber, and his younger brothers, Robek and Fantek. They live in a forest near a small town and struggle with the effects of human activity – clearing the forest for roads and housing developments, as well as environmental pollution, such as trash left by tourists and water pollution from industrial waste.

The novel was published by the Czytelnik Publishing House. The cover illustration was created by Katarzyna Gintowt.

== Plot ==
The protagonists of the novel are gnome-like creatures called wsamrazki or Root People (the oldest, Niber, and his younger brothers, Robek and Fantek), who live in modern times in a forest near a small town. They must confront the changes brought about by increasing human interference in their natural environment – such as deforestation for roads or housing construction and environmental pollution (from littering tourists as well as industrial waste that contaminates the water).

== Reception ==
In 1989, the book was reviewed for Trybuna Ludu by Grażyna Ciechomska. She praised it as a carefully and well-produced work aimed at young readers (specifically boys), although she noted the absence of colorful illustrations (only black and white ones are included). She found it to be a light, enjoyable, and funny read, positively assessing its unique and unpredictable world and plot. In summary, she wrote that "mystery, humor, and an original idea intertwined with good, vivid language".

A reviewer for the magazine Wybrzeże in 1989 (writing under the pseudonym kod) described the book as an ideal read for children aged five and older. He commended it for avoiding "stilted didacticism", noting the well-developed characters, charming world, and interesting plot, which he compared to an action movie.

That same year, Jolanta Kowalczykówna reviewed the book for Nowe Książki. She identified the main theme as environmental protection, calling it "trendy" and even "urgent". She praised its educational value (e.g., "wise, altruistic aphorisms"), but pointed out that the ecological themes might be too difficult for younger readers, while older children ("youth") might be uninterested in a story featuring gnomes, criticizing the "disproportion between form and content". She also criticized the book for being "filled with lengthiness and tedium", but praised it as "written in beautiful language" (with a few exceptions). In her conclusion, she stated that the book "may not be an artistic revelation, but it is a novel written sympathetically and with concern for the common good, which is nature, making it a worthwhile read".

== Analysis ==
The author, Janina Wieczerska, stated in an interview with the magazine Tytuł in 1998 that this book is "very important" to her. She wrote it during the martial law period in the early 1980s, "for herself and as comfort for others". She referred to the book as a fairy tale and a "moral utopia".

The book contains elements of fantasy and science fiction; at the end of the novel, the gnomes return "to planet Decyma to practice at the Higher School of Wizards". A reviewer from Wybrzeże noted that while the main characters are gnome-like creatures, they use props more typical of science fiction than fairy tales.

In the biography of the writer in Słownik literatury dziecięcej i młodzieżowej ('Dictionary of Children's and Youth Literature') published in 2002, Teresa Winek described the book as a modern fairy tale that illustrates "the dangers of contemporary civilization, which leads to the disregard for good and love and the destruction of the beauty of nature and cultural heritage". Kowalczykówna also classified the book as a modern fairy tale.
