= Bob Delegall =

American actor, director and producer (1945–2006)

- Born: Robert W. Delegall; July 24, 1945; Philadelphia, Pennsylvania, U.S.
- Died: March 21, 2006 (aged 60); Venice, California, U.S.
- Other name: Robert W. Delegall
- Occupations: Actor, television director, television producer
- Years active: 1972–2005
- Spouse: Fran Saperstein (2 children)

Robert W. Delegall (July 24, 1945 – March 21, 2006) was an American actor, television director and producer. He has guest starred in number of notable television series namely Adam-12, Good Times, The Six Million Dollar Man, Knots Landing and among other series.

== Life and career ==
Delegall was born in Philadelphia, Pennsylvania. Along with acting on film and television he appeared in a number of Philadelphia and Broadway theater productions namely The Basic Training of Pavlo Hummel and The Sunshine Train among others.

Delegall was also an acting coach teaching actors Gregory Hines, Malcolm-Jamal Warner, Michael O'Keefe and Tyra Banks.

After guest starring in number of notable television series, Delegall pursued a career in television directing and producing in 1997. He served as director and producer on the CBS sitcom The Gregory Hines Show followed by directing episodes of the Showtime drama Linc's in 1998. He went back to acting in 2003 after a seven-year hiatus.

== Death ==
Delegall died on March 21, 2006, in Venice, California after fighting a ten-year battle with prostate cancer. He is survived by his wife Fran Saperstein, a film and television producer and their two children, Jewel and Eric.

== Filmography ==
Film
Year	Title	Role	Notes
1974	Hangup	Jennings	Theatrical film
1976	Sparkle	Mr. Daniels	Theatrical film
1978	Dr. Strange	Intern	Made-for-TV film
1978	Betrayal	Man in Bar	Made-for-TV film
1979	The Ordeal of Patty Hearst	Jackson	Made-for-TV film
1988	Honor Bound	Bates	Theatrical film
1988	The Presidio	Squad Room Lieutenant	Theatrical film
1991	Total Exposure	Detective Collins	Independent film
1991	Pizza Man	Mayor Bradley	Theatrical film
1994	Saints and Sinners	Captain Reineke	Independent film
1994	Secret Games 3	Louis	Independent film
1996	Back to Back	Sergeant Donahue	Made-for-TV film
2004	Murder Without Conviction	Det. Abe Lorenz	Made-for-TV film
2006	Jane Doe: Til Death Do Us Part	Warden	Made-for-TV film

Television
Year	Title	Role	Notes
1972	Bonanza	Willie Moon	1 episode
1973	Police Story	June Bug	1 episode
1974/1975	The Six Million Dollar Man	1st Technician/Tom Dempster	2 episodes
1975	Marcus Welby, M.D.	Dr. Tom Haddon	2 episodes
1975	McMillan & Wife	Reporter	1 episode
1975	Caribe	Chuck	1 episode
1975	Adam-12	Officer Marks	1 episode
1975	Starsky and Hutch	Gregg Morton	1 episode
1976	Gemini Man	Steward	1 episode
1977	Good Times	Dr. Blake	1 episode
1978	Project UFO	Captain Harlan	1 episode
1979	Time Express	Doctor	1 episode
1979/1980	The White Shadow	Pinico Coach/Officer Robinson	2 episodes
1980	Benson	Priest	1 episode
1980/1982	Quincy, M.E.	Ray Stone/Coach Drake	2 episodes
1981	The Jeffersons	Dr. Ed Foster	1 episode
1982	House Calls	Flowers	1 episode
1983/1985	Hill Street Blues	IAD Munson/Mr. Jethroe	2 episodes
1985	Knight Rider	Lt. Rayford	1 episode
1986	Making a Living	Pennington	1 episode
1986	The Twilight Zone	Sales manager	1 episode
1986	On Wings of Eagles	Ron Davis	TV miniseries
1987	Hunter	Lt. Weber	1 episode
1987	Matlock	Dr. Lewis Weeks	1 episode
1989	Valerie's Family	Dr. Murphy	1 episode
1991	Family Matters	George Randolph	1 episode
1992	Knots Landing	Hugh O'Neill	1 episode
1994	The Good Life	Charles Stowe	1 episode
1995	Sister, Sister	Officer Reed	1 episode
1995	The Drew Carey Show	Dr. Singer	1 episode
1996	Sparks	Mr. Crawford	1 episode
2003	The Agency	Sylvester Demby	1 episode
