= Daniel Cerny =

American actor

- Born: Daniel Armin Cerny; December 11, 1981 (age 44); Los Angeles, California
- Occupations: Actor, director, musician, producer, singer, editor
- Years active: 1987–present

Daniel Armin Cerny (born December 11, 1981) is an American actor, producer, singer, musician and film editor, best known for his roles in the horror films Demonic Toys (1992) and Children of the Corn III: Urban Harvest (1995).

== Life and career ==
Cerny was born in 1981 in Los Angeles, the son of Helena and Pavel Cerny. His brother is politician Andrei Cherny. His parents are Czechoslovak Jewish immigrants, who were dissidents in Prague. He expressed interest in film and acting at a young age, and made his debut in Doc Hollywood (1991) with a minor role, followed by playing the manifestation of an evil spirit in the horror film Demonic Toys (1992). In 1994, he was cast in a supporting role in Peter Weir's Fearless (1993) opposite Jeff Bridges.

He played the lead role of Eli Porter in the 1995 horror film Children of the Corn III: Urban Harvest. Cerny gave up acting after the film, only returning for a minor part in an episode of the miniseries Revelations (2005) opposite Bill Pullman, and a supporting part in the direct-to-video sequel The Prince & Me II: The Royal Wedding (2006). Cerny worked as an assistant editor on the television series TransGeneration (2005) and The Janice Dickinson Modeling Agency (2006).

== Filmography ==
As an actor
Year	Title	Role	Notes
1991	Doc Hollywood	Boy with Spider	
1992	Demonic Toys	The Kid	
1994	Fearless	Byron Hummel	
1993	Phenom	Jimmy	Episode: "Game Face"
1995	Children of the Corn III: Urban Harvest	Eli Porter	
2005	Revelations	Male Student	Episode: "Hour One"
2006	The Prince & Me II: The Royal Wedding	Jake	

As a crew member
Year	Title	Credit	Notes
2005	TransGeneration	Assistant editor	Eight episodes
2006	The Janice Dickinson Modeling Agency	Assistant editor	Sixteen episodes
