= Linda Cook (actress) =

American actress (1948–2012)

- Cook as Egypt Jones Masters on Loving
- Born: June 8, 1948; Lubbock, Texas, U.S.
- Died: April 12, 2012 (aged 63); New York City, New York, U.S.
- Occupation: Actress

Linda O. Cook (June 8, 1948 – April 12, 2012) was an American actress, best known for her portrayal of Egypt Jones Masters on the American daytime soap opera Loving from 1988 to 1991, and from 1993 to 1994.

== Early life ==
Cook was born in Lubbock, Texas, but left there at age three due to her father's frequent job transfers. While attending high school in Atlanta, Georgia, Cook was accepted into the Atlanta Civic Ballet and toured with the group.

== Career ==
She made her off-Broadway debut in the 1974 play The Wager and would go on to appear in several other off-Broadway plays. In 1985, she starred opposite Carroll O'Connor and Frances Sternhagen in the Broadway play Home Front.

Cook appeared on One Life to Live, Guiding Light, As the World Turns, Ryan's Hope, All My Children, Real Ghosts (a.k.a. Haunted Lives: True Ghost Stories) and The Edge of Night.

She voiced Leech Woman in Puppet Master, and Baby Oopsie Daisy in Demonic Toys, although it was uncredited.

== Personal life ==
She was diagnosed with breast cancer in the early-1990s and died in 2012 at age 63.

== Filmography ==
=== Film ===
Year	Title	Role	Notes
1973	All the Young Wives	Melody	
1989	Puppet Master	Leech Woman	
1991	The Arrival	Voice	
1992	Demonic Toys	Baby Oopsie Daisy	
1996	The Spitfire Grill	Voice	
1998	Wrestling with Alligators	Agnes	
1999	Puppet	Tania	

=== Television ===
Year	Title	Role	Notes
1975–77,1984	The Edge of Night	Laurie Ann Karr	13 episodes
1981	Nurse	Mrs. Hyams	Episode: "Equal Opportunity"
1981, 1993, 2007	As the World Turns	Lucy Hunter/Cynthia Linders/Ann Reynolds	4 episodes
1987	L.A. Law	Woman #2	Episode: "The Wizard of Odds"
1987	Newhart	Stephanie's Friend	Episode: "Till Depth Do Us Part: Part 2"
1988–91,1993-1994	Loving	Egypt Jones Masters	57 episodes
1994	In the Heat of the Night	Mary Walker	Episode: "A Matter of Justice"
2001	Law & Order: Special Victims Unit	Susan Young	Episode: "Stole"
2001	Law & Order	Sonya Bergman / Paige	2 episodes
