= Ed Grady =

American actor (1923–2012)

- Born: August 31, 1923; Kinston, North Carolina, U.S.
- Died: December 10, 2012 (aged 89); Columbia, South Carolina, U.S.
- Education: University of North Carolina at Chapel Hill (B.A.)
- Years active: 1979–2005
- Spouses: Diana Jayne Elliott (m. 1951; died 1984) Carolyn Frances Ramsay (m. 1985)
- Children: 2

Edward Louis Grady (August 31, 1923 – December 10, 2012) was an American stage, film and television actor and teacher.

== Early life ==
Grady was born to Eddie Jones Grady and Maude Clara (née Hodges) Grady on August 31, 1923, in Kinston, North Carolina. He graduated from Grainger High School in Kinston. Grady enlisted in the Army Air Force during World War II and trained as a cryptographer. He served on Ie Shima (Iejima) during the war, and was awarded the Soldier's Medal for rescuing the pilot of a P-47 which was on fire.

Grady received a Bachelor of Arts degree in theater and English from the University of North Carolina at Chapel Hill (UNC) after World War II. He was the member of the Carolina Playmakers at the Playmakers Theatre while studying at UNC. Grady later became an English teacher in New York City, where he also taught a photo workshop held at Columbia University.

== Acting and teaching ==
Grady's film credits included A Simple Twist of Fate in 1994, Lolita in 1997, and The Notebook in 2004. His television roles included the 1993 television miniseries, Alex Haley's Queen; the 1993 Hallmark Hall of Fame television movie, To Dance with the White Dog; as well as a string of series including In the Heat of the Night, I'll Fly Away, Matlock, and Dawson's Creek, in which he had a recurring role as Gramps Ryan.

Grady's theater roles included three seasons at Unto These Hills, an outdoor Cherokee historical drama staged in Cherokee, North Carolina. Grady portrayed Drowning Bear in the play, which follows the story of the Eastern Band of Cherokee Indians.

In addition to acting, Grady taught television production and English at Freedom High School in Morganton, North Carolina, during the 1970s and Keenan High School in Columbia, South Carolina. He was a resident of Columbia, South Carolina.

== Death and legacy ==
Ed Grady died at Palmetto Health Richland hospital in Columbia, South Carolina, on December 10, 2012, at the age of 89. His first wife, Jayne Elliott Grady, had died previously. He was survived by his second wife of 27 years, Carolyn F. Ramsay; two children, Marta and Sean; and two stepchildren, Caroline Hattrich and Stephen Hattrich.

== Filmography ==
- Wolfman (1979) - Reverend Leonard
- Lady Grey (1980) - Hubbard Jackson
- Reuben, Reuben (1983) - Dr. William Ormsby
- The Last Game (1984) - John Gant
- D.A.R.Y.L. (1985) - Mr. Bergen
- Unmasking the Idol (1986) - Male Prisoner
- From the Hip (1987) - Baxter
- Born to Race (1988) - Paul
- Days of Our Lives (1989, TV) - Minister
- Chattahoochee (1989) - Stream of Consciousness Man
- Black Rainbow (1989) - Editor, Geoff McBain
- Escape (1989) - Hobo #1
- The Handmaid's Tale (1990) - Old Man
- Modern Love (1990) - Judge
- The Lost Capone (1990, TV Movie) - Sam Ellroy
- Not Without My Daughter (1991) - Grandpa
- Paris Trout (1991) - Judge Travis
- The Perfect Tribute (1991, TV Movie) - Doctor Stone
- Night of the Hunter (1991, TV Movie) - Walt
- Wild Hearts Can't Be Broken (1991) - Preacher
- Children of the Corn II: The Final Sacrifice (1992) - Dr. Appleby
- Consenting Adults (1992) - Mr. Watkins
- Alex Haley's Queen (1993, TV) - Doctor
- The Young Indiana Jones Chronicles (1993, TV) - Professor Hunt
- Bandit: Bandit Goes Country (1994, TV Movie) - Preacher
- The Yearling (1994, TV Movie) - Doc Wilson
- Oldest Living Confederate Widow Tells All (1994, TV Movie) - Robert E. Lee
- A Simple Twist of Fate (1994) - Judge Marcus
- Tad (1995, TV Movie) - Seward
- Children of the Corn III: Urban Harvest (1995) - Dr. Appleby
- The Closest Thing to Heaven (1996) - George
- Lolita (1997) - Dr. Melinik
- Dawson's Creek (1998, TV) - Gramps Ryan
- Morgan's Ferry (2001) - Ferry Master
- New Best Friend (2002) - Alicia's Doctor
- The Notebook (2004) - Harry
