= Bad Channels =

- Theatrical release poster
- Directed by: Ted Nicolaou
- Written by: Charles Band; Jackson Barr
- Produced by: Charles Band; Keith S. Payson
- Cinematography: Adolfo Bartoli
- Edited by: Carol Oblath
- Production company: Full Moon Entertainment
- Distributed by: Paramount Home Video
- Release date: June 25, 1992
- Running time: 88 minutes
- Country: United States
- Language: English

Bad Channels is a 1992 American science fiction spoof direct-to-video film, produced by Full Moon Features and released by Paramount Home Video. It is about two aliens (Cosmo and Lump) who invade a radio station with the intention of capturing female humans, by using radio broadcasts. The hero is a DJ forced to combat the aliens alone when listeners think he is joking about the invasion.

The film also has its own soundtrack composed and performed by Blue Öyster Cult.

== Synopsis ==
KDUL is a new radio station running a promotion where DJ Dangerous Dan is chained to a chair until a listener calls in and guesses the combination to the locks. When the correct combination is finally guessed, a TV journalist, Lisa, suspects the solution was faked and that the promotion was a fraud. On her way to the station to confront the DJ, she witnesses a UFO.

Two aliens invade the radio station, using a device to capture female listeners. As they are abducted, the women imagine themselves starring in a music video. Once the video is completed, the alien shrinks and imprisons the women in clear tubes. Among the captured are a nurse (Melissa Behr), a waitress, and a cheerleader.

Realizing what the aliens are planning, the DJ warns his listeners to turn off the radio. However, listeners assume it's just another promotion. The alien attempts to capture Lisa, but instead shrinks a bystander.

The DJ is not taken seriously until more women go missing, drawing the attention of the military. Eventually, the DJ discovers that the aliens are vulnerable to common disinfectant and uses it to defeat them, rescuing the women. All of the women—except Bunny—are restored to their normal size.

The broadcast attracts 10,000 listeners.

In a post-credit scene, a miniature man suggests that the shrunken woman, Bunny, might want a visit from Dollman.

== Cast ==
- Paul Hipp as Dan O'Dare
- Martha Quinn as Lisa Cummings
- Aaron Lustig as Vernon Locknut
- Ian Patrick Williams as Dr. Payne
- Charlie Spradling as Cookie
- Melissa Behr as Nurse Ginger Jones
- Robert Factor as Willis
- Roumel Reaux as Flip Humble
- Rodney Ueno as Moon Hashimoto
- Daryl Strauss as Bunny Bonner
- Ron Keel as Grits

== Critical response ==
Cinemaphile gave the film a bad review, 0/4 stars, calling it a "mess" and saying "I fear that the creators of this movie must have had brain tissue damaged sometime in their lifetimes." The Film Fiend was more positive, calling it "hilariously cheesy". Classic Rock magazine described the soundtrack as "a grotesque mistake". User Ochnop at Something Awful gave Bad Channels a -39 out of a -50 (being the worst) saying "Who could ask for anything more from a film besides a bag to throw up in? "Bad Channels" is truly something awful." Creature Feature liked the movie, giving it 3.5 out of 5 stars. It found the movie to be one of the more inventive of those produced by Charles Band and enjoyed the cable news satire. However, Moria gave it one star, finding it wears out its premise and is padded. TV Guide agreed with Moria's review. Entertainment Weekly gave the movie a D. While it found it to be cheerfully cheesy, it found that it needed to be funnier.

== Production ==
Director Ted Nicolaou initially did not want to be involved with the movie, finding its story too close to his other recent movie TerrorVision. However, he was attracted to making the fake music videos. Pat Siciliano scouted bands for the movie and was instrumental in the final choice. The end credits crossover with Dollman was shot in one day.

== Release ==
Bad Channels was released direct-to-video on VHS in 1992. It received a DVD release in 2013. A remastered Blu-ray was released on June 10, 2025.

== Soundtrack ==
Bad Channels featured a soundtrack album titled Bad Channels that was composed and performed by Blue Öyster Cult and also had songs from a few other bands such as Sykotik Sinfoney, Joker, Fair Game, and DMT.

== Crossover ==
A semi-sequel was released in the form of Dollman vs. Demonic Toys, a crossover film featuring characters from Dollman, Demonic Toys and Bad Channels.
