= Children of the Corn III: Urban Harvest =

1995 film by James D. R. Hickox

- Home video release poster
- Directed by: James D. R. Hickox
- Written by: Dode B. Levenson
- Based on: Children of the Corn by Stephen King
- Produced by: Gary Depew; Brad Southwick
- Starring: Daniel Cerny; Ron Melendez; Michael Ensign; Jon Clair
- Cinematography: Gerry Lively
- Edited by: Chris Peppe
- Music by: Daniel Licht
- Production companies: Dimension Films; Park Avenue Productions
- Distributed by: Buena Vista Home Video (Note: Distributed under the Dimension Home Video banner.)
- Release date: September 12, 1995
- Running time: 92 minutes
- Country: United States
- Language: English

Children of the Corn III: Urban Harvest is a 1995 American supernatural slasher film directed by James D. R. Hickox, and starring Daniel Cerny, Jim Metzler, Nancy Grahn, and Mari Morrow. It is the third film in the Children of the Corn film series, and focuses on two mysterious brothers who are adopted from rural Nebraska and brought to Chicago as a chain of deadly occurrences surrounding the family follows, involving a cult in which the younger brother is a follower. Children of the Corn III marked the film debuts of Nicholas Brendon, Ivana Miličević, and Charlize Theron. Ed Grady reprises his role as Dr. Richard Appleby from the first sequel via a flashback sequence to Children of the Corn II: The Final Sacrifice.

The film was followed by an unrelated sequel, titled Children of the Corn IV: The Gathering (1996).

== Plot ==
In a farm in Gatlin, Nebraska, Joshua and his younger brother Eli take refuge in the nearby cornfield when their abusive father comes looking for them in a drunken rage. As their father approaches with a scythe, Eli decides to stay behind and face him, despite Joshua's insistence that they flee and find a better hiding spot. After rebuking their father for beating Joshua, he uses a pagan Bible to invoke the power of "He Who Walks Behind the Rows" to have the cornstalks murder their father, turning his mutilated body into a makeshift scarecrow. Joshua returns to check on Eli, and the two depart, with Eli's Bible being magically buried in the soil.

Eli and Joshua are taken into foster care by William and Amanda Porter of Chicago. The two boys do not mix well in modern Chicago; their formal, Amish-like clothes from Gatlin, Eli's fire-and-brimstone prayer at dinner, and their bringing a suitcase full of corn that Eli stole to Chicago strike their new parents and neighbors as unusual. On his first night in Chicago, after everyone else has gone to sleep, Eli quietly leaves the Porters', taking his corn-filled suitcase, and heads to an empty factory on the other side of the backyard fence. There, he prays to He Who Walks Behind the Rows and plants corn seeds on the factory grounds; rows of corn appear almost instantly.

The next day, the boys start school, and Eli nearly gets into a fight with T-Loc, a student in Joshua's grade, and criticizes Joshua for playing basketball with the other students. Disgusted with their classmates' modern lifestyle, Eli decides to bring He Who Walks Behind the Rows to Chicago, and a homeless man who finds the cornfield is murdered. Joshua becomes attracted to his neighbor Maria and befriends her brother Malcolm, gradually spending less and less time with Eli.

The social worker who brought Eli and Joshua to the Porters' discovers that Eli was adopted initially from Gatlin, Nebraska (the town from the first film), and that he has not aged since 1964. She tries to warn the Porters, but Eli quickly burns her alive for knowing too much. Amanda notices Eli's strange mannerisms, and when she tries to cut down his cornfield, the plants attack her. She attempts to escape, but she trips on a pole and her head is impaled on a broken pipe, killing her instantly. William finds the cornfield Eli has planted and realizes that its seemingly perfect natural invulnerability to disease, ability to grow out of season, and tolerance for the worst soil could result in high agricultural demand. William begins efforts to market the distribution of the corn and looks forward to the massive profits Eli's strain of corn will bring.

Eli neglects to inform his foster father of another property the corn possesses: it warps the minds of those who eat it, causing adults to enter a deluded state of cheerful, naive apathy and children to become followers of He Who Walks Behind the Rows. William, having tasted the corn, becomes indifferent to everything except finding the means to distribute the corn, and eventually finds backers for the venture. Eli ultimately manages to sway the other students towards his beliefs, turning them against the principal and convincing them to abandon basketball and other typically routine activities. Alarmed at Eli's conversion of the students, the principal attempts to inform other staff, but they don't believe him, as Eli's efforts have actually restored order at the school to a degree few had thought possible.

By the time Joshua realizes the whole truth, Eli has killed the school principal, along with Maria and Malcolm's parents. Furthermore, he has gained complete control of his fellow students. Joshua and Malcolm travel to the farm in Gatlin and, after defeating Joshua's reanimated father, manage to find Eli's Bible in the cornfield. However, He Who Walks Behind the Rows attacks them. Malcolm is violently dismembered, but Joshua manages to escape with the Bible and return to Chicago. William arrives at the factory and announces that Eli's corn will be shipped around the world. Eli then murders him with a sickle. Joshua arrives and confronts Eli, revealing that he and the Bible are linked, allowing one to survive indefinitely as long as the other is intact. Eli charges at Joshua, attempting to reclaim the Bible. But just as he manages to grab it, Joshua stabs Eli with a sickle, piercing the Bible in the process, destroying both of them.

Just as all the students break free of the corn's spell, He Who Walks Behind the Rows emerges from the soil, taking the form of a giant, grotesque, worm-like monster. It begins to kill several students, including T-Loc, and swallows Maria. Joshua identifies its weakness as the large, root-like section of its lower body, embedded in the ground. Using his sickle, Joshua slices through this part, seemingly killing the monster. After it collapses, Joshua frees Maria and leaves with the other students.

As the film closes, a shipment of Eli's corn arrives in Germany, the beginning of shipments all over the world.

== Cast ==
- Daniel Cerny as Eli Porter
- Ron Melendez as Joshua Porter
- Mari Morrow as Maria Elkman
- Michael Ensign as Father Frank Nolan
- Jon Clair as Malcolm Elkman
- Duke Stroud as Earl
- Rance Howard as Employer
- Brian Peck as Jake Witman
- Nancy Lee Grahn as Amanda Porter
- Ed Grady as Dr. Richard Appleby
- Jim Metzler as William Porter
- Garvin Funches as T-Loc
- Yvette Freeman as Samantha
- Kelly Nelson as Teacher
- Charlize Theron as Eli's follower (uncredited, non-speaking)
- Ivana Miličević as Eli's follower / Acolyte
- Nicholas Brendon as Basketball Player One

== Production ==
Dode B. Levenson was the son of a conservative Rabbi who became a screenwriter in order to support his true passion in Journalism. After completing and selling his first spec script, Trans-Atlantic Pictures hired Levenson to write the script for Angel 4: Undercover which in turn led to him being hired to write the script for the company's third Children of the Corn film. Levenson initially had no interest in writing exploitation, but quickly realized he enjoyed writing for movies regardless of what they were and appreciated the opportunity to learn more about film-making.

Principal photography began in December 1993 and ended on January 15, 1994. The special effects for the film were supervised by Kevin Yagher.

== Release ==
=== Home media ===
Children of the Corn III: Urban Harvest was the first film in the series made under Dimension Films (former division of Disney), who purchased the rights to the series and distributed the seven sequels to the original two films. It was also the first film in the series to be released direct-to-video, arriving at U.S. video stores on September 12, 1995 on VHS

The film debuted on Blu-ray on May 10, 2011, via Echo Bridge Entertainment. Arrow Films also released a Region 2 Blu-ray box set of the first three Children of the Corn films in 2021.

== Reception ==
J.R. Taylor of Entertainment Weekly gave the film a B-rating: "This latest installment — the best of the Stephen King-derived series — offers some unexpected plot developments and surprisingly chilling gore. But fear not, it's unlikely Urban Harvest will cause nightmares, due to its hilariously inept climax. When the humongous corn creature shakes a screaming girl in its goo paws, the victim looks suspiciously like a Barbie doll". TV Guide awarded the film two out of five stars, praising the performances, and adding: "Against the odds, this horror series (initially based on a Stephen King short story) has actually improved over time to the point where this third installment is a creditable if far-fetched chiller".

Author Stephen King, who'd voiced criticism of the prior Children of the Corn films, noted that he "actually liked" Children of the Corn III.

== See also ==
- Children of the Corn (film series)
- List of adaptations of works by Stephen King
