= Total Exposure (film) =

- Total Exposure film poster
- Directed by: John Quinn
- Written by: John Quinn; Lynne Dahlgren
- Produced by: Steve Beswick; Jeff Prettyman
- Starring: Michael Nouri; Season Hubley; Jeff Conaway; Bob Delegall
- Cinematography: Kent L. Wakeford
- Edited by: Kert Vandermeulen
- Music by: Sasha Matson
- Production company: Promark Entertainment Group
- Distributed by: Republic Pictures
- Release date: October 29, 1991 (United States)
- Running time: 97 minutes
- Country: United States
- Language: English

Total Exposure is a 1991 direct to video crime thriller directed by John Quinn, written by Quinn with Lynne Dahlgren, and starring Season Hubley and Michael Nouri. It has notably been described as a far better than average exploitation movie. Among the supporting cast is Playboy Playmate Deborah Driggs.

== Plot ==
Top female photographer Andi (Season Hubley) returns from a glamor photo session in Mexico, only to find a stash of cocaine in her bag, smuggled in by her star model Kathy (Deborah Driggs). Considering her own prior convictions, and fearing the police, she dumps the entire stash down the drain immediately. Kathy denies responsibility and eventually turns up dead. And now, there are some nasty people who don't quite believe anybody, let alone a former junkie, would flush away a fortune in drugs, and they want it back, or else! She gets ex-cop Dave Murphy (Michael Nouri) to protect her from the killer criminal (Jeff Conaway).

== Cast ==
- Michael Nouri as Dave Murphy
- Season Hubley as Andi Robinson
- Jeff Conaway as Peter Keynes
- Bob Delegall as Detective Collins
- Deborah Driggs as Kathy
- Anthony Russell as Harry
- Kristine Rose as Rita
- Dean Devlin as Adult Bookstore Manager
- Christian Bocher as Mark
- Robert Prentiss Zack
- Linda Hoffman as Patty
- Martina Castle as Cissy
- Dennis Paladino as Detective Alberts
- Jennifer Perito as Molly
- John F. Goff as Arthur
- Connie Craig as Patricia Keynes
- Wendy Gordon as TV News Anchorwoman
- Chris Neilsen as Jimmy
- James Patten Eagle as Sleazy TV Director
- Mark Harigian as Fitness Trainer

== Reception ==
TV Guide called the film a "predictable, if well-produced, urban thriller". They write that John Quinn directs "with occasional verve", and the acting is fine, including that of veteran leads Hubley and Nouri, and "there are some spunky bit parts", but it was felt "Lynn Dahlgren and Quinn's convoluted screenplay is tiresomely familiar". In Thrilling Detective relates "Michael Nouri is almost interesting as low-key Los Angeles private eye", and toward the film writes it was not "a bad film, but really pretty standard, run-of-the-mill fare", and of Michael Nouri's character, "Murphy's soft-spokeness, and easy-going spin on things might have been developed a bit more, but there's not much else really interesting going on, except maybe for catching Jeff Conaway as the aforementioned DA." VideoHound's Golden Movie Retriever describes the film as "total idiocy involving unclad babes and hormonally imbalanced men in blackmail and murder".
