= Pete Schrum =

American actor (1934-2003)

Pete Schrum (also Peter Schrum; born Paul Richard Shrum; December 16, 1934 – February 17, 2003) was an American actor.

Schrum was born in Canton, Ohio, and started acting while attending Catholic school. He is most memorable for playing Uncle Ed in the television series Gimme a Break! and Uncle Ed in the television movie The Jerk, Too. He played the shotgun-wielding bartender "Lloyd" in Terminator 2: Judgment Day (1991). Schrum died from a heart attack on February 17, 2003, aged 68, in Prescott, Arizona.

== Notable roles ==
=== Movies ===
Year	Title	Role	Notes
1980	Galaxina	Fat Daddy	
1980	Falling in Love Again	Meatloaf (Present day)	
1982	Movie Madness	Greek Priest - 'Success Wanters'	
1984	Trancers	Santa Claus	
1986	Eliminators	Ray	
1986	Hollywood Harry	Clapper	
1987	Flicks	Narrator	(segment 'New Adventures of the Great Galaxy'); Reginald Harcroft IV (segment "Whodunit")
1988	The Night Before	Fat Jack	Uncredited
1989	Arena		Voice
1991	Blue Desert	Burly Man	
1991	Terminator 2: Judgment Day	Lloyd, the bartender	
1992	Demonic Toys	Charnetski	
1995	Dead Man	Drunk	
2001	The Man Who Wasn't There	Truck Driver	Uncredited, (final film role)

=== Television ===
Year	Title	Role	Notes
1982-1983	Gimme a Break!	Uncle Ed Kanisky	9 episodes
1990	Night Court	Longshoreman	1 episode
1982-1983	The Jeffersons	Dollar / Mom	Voice; 2 episodes
1989-1990	Chip 'n Dale Rescue Rangers	Sewernose de Bergerac / Euripides And Voltaire / El Emenopeo / Francis / Hubba Hubba / Bud / Police Chief / Museum Guard and Jail Guard	Voice; 5 episodes
