= Auntie Lee's Meat Pies =

Horror film by Parker Finn

- Theatrical release poster
- Directed by: Joseph F. Robertson
- Written by: Joseph F. Robertson; Gerald M. Steiner
- Produced by: Gerald M. Steiner
- Starring: Karen Black; Pat Morita; Kristine Rose; Michael Berryman
- Cinematography: Arledge Armenaki
- Music by: Scott Broberg; Michael Licari
- Production company: Steiner Films
- Distributed by: Trans World Entertainment; Columbia Pictures
- Release date: October 21, 1992
- Running time: 100 minutes
- Country: United States
- Language: English

Auntie Lee's Meat Pies is a 1992 American comedy horror film directed by Joseph F. Robertson and starring Karen Black, Pat Morita, Kristine Rose, and Michael Berryman. Its plot follows a devil-worshipping woman who employs her four nieces to lure virile young men back to her farm where they are butchered and their bodies ground into meat pies that she sells to the community. Its supporting cast includes Pat Paulsen, Ava Fabian, Teri Weigel, and Huntz Hall, in his final film role.

The film borrows elements of Sweeney Todd and the slasher film Motel Hell (1980).

== Plot ==
In the small town of Penance, California, Auntie Lee employs her four beautiful nieces—Fawn, Magnolia, Coral, and Sky—to pick up virile men and lure them to her farm, where they are butchered and their remains harvested into meat pies that Auntie Lee sells to the community. Her operation is helped by her handyman brother, Larry, and she maintains a friendly rapport with the unsuspecting town sheriff, Chief Koal.

One day, Fawn brings home Bob Evans, a male drifter hitchhiking to San Francisco, and decapitates him in the kitchen pantry using a booby trap. Larry helps clean Fawn's car to remove any evidence of Bob. Meanwhile, Coral gets stranded when her car suffers a flat tire, and Chief Koal drives her to the farm, where Auntie Lee invites him in. Shortly after, investigator Harold Ivars arrives in Penance, searching for Bob. Larry brings Coral's car to the local auto shop to have the tire repaired, and is spotted by Koal, who strikes a conversation with him. As Larry rummages through the car's trunk, he accidentally reveals a skeletal human hand, prompting Koal to bring him to the police station for questioning. Larry spends the evening at the station speaking with Koal.

Meanwhile, the girls bring home a group of four punk musicians—John, Craig, Doc, and Phil—after shooting out their tires. The women host a dinner for the men, and bring out Baby, Auntie Lee's fifth niece, a developmentally-delayed adult woman who has the mindset of an infant. Magnolia brings Doc to Baby's room, where she sleeps in a giant crib, and handcuffs him under the guise that they will have sex, before Baby chews his neck and kills him. Sky brings John to the basement where Auntie Lee's kitchen is located and kills him with a meathook. Meanwhile, Fawn seduces and murders Phil, gouging out his eyes and slashing his throat with a meat cleaver.

Coral brings Craig upstairs to an elaborate large snake altar, where she paints his body and begins a striptease for him, before he is impaled by the fangs of a large snake statue. Shortly after, Harold arrives at the farm to question the women, and is met by Magnolia, whom he earlier encountered in town. Harold goes to question Fawn who is having her nightly swim in the pool, and is soon joined by Coral, Magnolia, and Sky, who encircle him in the pool before stabbing him to death. As they kill Harold, Auntie Lee prays to Satan.

The next morning, Koal returns to the farm with Larry. Koal meets with Auntie Lee, and informs her that Larry has confessed to the murders, unaware that it is Auntie Lee and her nieces who are in fact the perpetrators. Fawn begs Koal to let Larry go and conceal the murders, but he explains it is impossible, and that Larry must be held accountable. Fawn lures Koal into the kitchen, where she asks him to help fix the sink garbage disposal. When he attempts to dislodge the blade, Auntie Lee turns on the disposal, grinding up his hand, before shooting him in the head with his own pistol.

== Cast ==
- Karen Black as Auntie Lee
- Pat Morita as Chief Koal
- Kristine Rose as Fawn
- Michael Berryman as Larry
- Pat Paulsen as Minister
- Huntz Hall as Farmer
- Ava Fabian as Magnolia
- Richard Vidan as Bruno
- David Parry as Harold Ivars
- Teri Weigel as Coral
- Stephen Quadros as Bob Evans
- Pía Reyes as Sky
- Petra Verkaik as Baby
- Louie Bonanno as Doc
- Lex Lang as John
- Grant Cramer as Phil
- Cort McCown as Craig

== Production ==
The film was shot in Los Angeles and Fullerton, California. Principal photography was underway in late August 1990.

== Release ==
The film was screened at the American Film Market in late-October 1991 in Los Angeles. Columbia-TriStar Home Entertainment released the film on home video on October 21, 1992.

On August 31, 2021, independent home video distributor Vinegar Syndrome released the film on Blu-ray for the first time. It features exclusive interviews with actors Michael Berryman, Richard Vidan, and Grant Cramer, and another interview with makeup effects artist Roy Knyrim.

== Sources ==
- Berglund, Jeff (2006). Cannibal Fictions: American Explorations of Colonialism, Race, Gender, and Sexuality. Madison, Wisconsin: University of Wisconsin Press. ISBN 978-0-299-21594-1.
