= Jacqueline Lovell =

American actress

- Born: 9 December 1974 (age 50); Southern California, U.S.
- Occupation(s): Actress, model
- Known for: Head of the Family; The Killer Eye

Jacqueline Lovell (born 9 December 1974) is an American actress born and raised in Southern California. During the 1990s, she modeled for magazines such as Playboy and Penthouse as Sara St. James, and was known for her roles in erotic videos and films. Although she stopped acting in sexploitation films from the early 2000s onwards, to appear in various TV or film productions, Lovell is best remembered for her roles in B-movies from the 1990s, Femmes Fatales calling her a "Scifi siren" and "the blonde bombshell who often irradiated Full Moon's horror films". She is sometimes credited as Jackie Lovell.

== Career ==
Jacqueline Lovell is perhaps best-known for her roles in 1990s horror or B-movies such as Head of the Family, Hideous!, or The Killer Eye. Many of those roles included nudity; evoking the production of the latter film, in which she had the lead role, John Horn recalls, "This role is a bisexual stoner,"' DeCoteau recalls telling (actor Dave Oren) Ward about his part in The Killer Eye, a dreadful horror film starring a giant eyeball that kills people with a blue light. 'He says, "Great, man, sounds good to me." I said, "You're gonna spend the entire movie in your underwear." "That's no problem," he said. I said, "Also, there's a scene where you and your bisexual lover have sex with a gorgeous blonde girl." He said, "Great, man."' When actress Jacqueline Lovell didn't want to pretend to have sex with two men, Ward agreed to fondle himself as he and the killer eyeball watched Lovell make out with a man."

In 1998 Femmes Fatales presented Lovell as "the next generation’s new breed of B-movie queen (...), a top draw on the video market. "

Film Threat describes another stage in her career from the early 2000s onwards: "She decided to get out the sexploitation game and start taking some acting lessons. Lovell and her husband moved to New York and she started taking extra parts in mainstream films and worked her way up to featured guest starring roles on television shows like Law & Order. She also found time to helm the indie feature Krush the Serpent."

== Filmography ==
=== Film ===
| Year | Title | Role | Notes |
|---|---|---|---|
| 1994 | Forrest Gump | Football Fan | Uncredited |
| 1995 | Nude Bowling Party | Barbie | |
| 1995 | Who Killed Buddy Blue? | Cindy | |
| 1995 | Nude Models Private Sessions 2 | Sara | |
| 1996 | Animal Instincts III | Cleaning Woman #2 | |
| 1996 | Virtual Encounters | Kika | |
| 1996 | Demolition High | Student | |
| 1996 | Femalien | Sun | |
| 1996 | Head of the Family | Lorretta | |
| 1996 | Walnut Creek | Masseuse | Uncredited |
| 1996 | Hard Time | Star | |
| 1996 | Erotic Heat | Work Out, Jacuzzi | |
| 1996 | Damien's Seed | Trix | |
| 1997 | Venus Descending | Icon | |
| 1997 | Hideous! | Sheila | |
| 1997 | The Exotic House of Wax | Star | |
| 1997 | You Only Live Until You Die | Pussy L'Amour | as Jackie Lovell |
| 1997 | The Body Beautiful | Susan | |
| 1997 | Legally Exposed | Victoria | |
| 1997 | I'm Watching You | Alisha | |
| 1998 | Lolita 2000 | Lolita | |
| 1998 | A Place Called Truth | Rita | |
| 1999 | The Killer Eye | Rita Grady | |
| 1999 | The Key to Sex | Ring | |
| 1999 | BUG BOY Adventures | Jackie | |
| 2000 | Black Sea 213 | Ursula | |
| 2001 | Women of the Night | Charlotte | |
| 2002 | Krush the Serpent | Alex Murphy | |
| 2004 | She Hate Me | Witness to Suicide | Uncredited |
| 2004 | Melinda and Melinda | Halloween Partygoer | |
| 2005 | Trust the Man | Bar Girl | Uncredited |
| 2005 | Little Manhattan | Subway Passenger | Uncredited |
| 2006 | The Pink Panther | Waitress | Uncredited |
| 2007 | The Warrior Class | New England Café Patron | Uncredited |
| 2007 | Brooklyn Rules | 80s Clubber | Uncredited |
| 2008 | Dead Country | Teri | |
| 2014 | Dwegons and Leprechauns | Missy / Tatiana | |
| 2014 | Trophy Heads | | |
| 2017 | Femaliens: Seduction of the Species | Narrator | |

=== Television ===
| Year | Title | Role | Notes |
|---|---|---|---|
| 1995 | California Dreams | Hotline Volunteer | Episode: "Community Service" |
| 1995 | Red Shoe Diaries | Various roles | 3 episodes |
| 1996 | Night Eyes Four: Fatal Passion | Runaway | Television film |
| 1997 | (The) Click (series, after Milo Manara) | Various roles | 4 episodes |
| 2004 | Law & Order | Heather | Episode: "The Dead Wives Club" |
| 2005 | Law & Order: Criminal Intent | Kyra | Episode: "Unchained" |
| 2006 | Love Monkey | Party Girl | Episode: "Pilot" |
| 2008 | CSI: NY | Louise Perry | Episode: "Like Water for Murder" |
| 2013 | Whitney | Susie | Episode: "Crazy, Stupid, Words" |
| 2017 | Forest Bathing: Friends W/Benefits | Jacqueline | 3 episodes |
