= Puppet Master: The Game =

2023 video game

- Developer: October Games
- Publishers: Full Moon Features; October Games
- Designer: Drake Kazmierczak
- Programmer: Maximilian Kube
- Writer: Nat Brehmer
- Series: Puppet Master
- Platform: Microsoft Windows
- Release: March 1, 2023
- Genre: Survival horror
- Modes: Single-player, multiplayer

Puppet Master: The Game is a 2023 free-to-play survival horror game based on the Puppet Master franchise. It was developed by October Games and published by Full Moon Features and October Games. It features co-operative gameplay and player versus player combat. Puppet Master: The Game was released in early access for Steam on March 1, 2023.

== Gameplay ==
Puppet Master: The Game is a third-person survival horror game set in a different locations from the Puppet Master franchise.

The game is an asymmetrical single-player and multiplayer video game. The multiplayer portion of the game features a human player against three puppet players as the human player attempts to retrieve artifacts related to André Toulon and escape with them. Perks can also be unlocked with experience points earned during gameplay that can be used to update characters' statistics. Players can also alter the appearance of their characters with skins.

== Characters ==
The game features three different humans and seven puppets. The humans featured are Agent, Dana Hadley and Neil Gallagher. The puppets featured are Blade, Jester, Leech Woman, Pinhead, Six-Shooter, Torch and Tunneler. New playable characters are also in the works.

== Release ==
On March 1, 2023, Puppet Master: The Game was released for an early access open beta on Steam. In April 2023, a roadmap was released for the game that detailed plans for upcoming updates that includes new factions, humans, maps, perks, puppets and weapons for humans as well as a Halloween event.

In March 2025, October Games announced that the Kickstarter campaign had been canceled due to concerns over whether the project could realistically be completed, while confirming that development would continue at a slower pace. About a year later, Puppet Master: The Game was delisted from Steam on February 25th, 2026.

=== Downloadable content ===
On Halloween, Full Moon announced downloadable content featuring the Demonic Toys, another Full Moon horror franchise. This marks their second crossover with Demonic Toys since Puppet Master vs Demonic Toys from 2004.

== See also ==
- List of horror video games
