= Kristine Rose =

American model and actress

- Occupations: Actress, model

Kristine Rose is an American model and actress. She is best remembered for her role as "Miss July" in Demonic Toys. Rose is also noted for making several appearances in Playboy publications and videos. She was the covergirl on the May 1992 issue of the Spanish version of Playboy as well as the March 1991 Book of Lingerie in the US. Rose appeared in several music videos and in the 1994 Bench Warmer bikini trading card series.

== Acting credits ==
=== Film ===
- 11 Days, 11 Nights 2 - Sarah Asproon (1990)
- Passion's Flower - Linda (1991)
- Total Exposure - Rita (1991)
- Demonic Toys - Miss July (1992)
- Round Trip to Heaven - Tina (1982)
- Auntie Lee's Meat Pies - Fawn (1992)
- To Sleep with a Vampire - Prom Queen (1993)
- Save Me - Cheryl (1994)

=== Television ===
- 1st & Ten ("If I Didn't Play Football") - Rachel (1990)
- Dark Justice ("Suitable for Framing") - (1993)
- After Hours - date unknown
- Out of This World - date unknown

=== Home video ===
- Playboy: Erotic Fantasies - Curio Shoppe (1992)
- Night Rhythms - Marilyn (1992)

=== Music videos ===
- Jet City Woman by Queensrÿche
- Save Me by The Rembrandts
- Desert Moon by Great White
- Call It Rock n' Roll by Great White
- Green-Tinted Sixties Mind by Mr. Big

== Modeling ==
=== Playboy publications ===
- Playboy's Book of Lingerie Vol. 18 March 1991 - cover.
- Playboy's Bathing Beauties June 1992 - pages 10–11, 97
- Playboy's Book of Lingerie Vol. 29 January 1993.
- Playboy's Book of Lingerie Vol. 30 March 1993 - page 103.
- Playboy's Bathing Beauties April 1993.
- Playboy's Book of Lingerie Vol. 31 May 1993.
- Playboy's Girls of Summer '93 June 1993 - page 72.
- Playboy's Book of Lingerie Vol. 32 July 1993.
- Playboy's Wet & Wild Women July 1993.
- Playboy's Blondes, Brunettes & Redheads August 1993.
- Playboy's Nudes December 1993 - pages 24, 103.
- Playboy's Book of Lingerie Vol. 35 January 1994.
- Playboy's Bathing Beauties March 1994 - page 21.
- Playboy's Book of Lingerie Vol. 36 March 1994.
- Playboy's Book of Lingerie Vol. 37 May 1994.
- Playboy's Blondes October 1995.
