= Hideous! =

- DVD Cover
- Directed by: Charles Band
- Written by: Neal Marshal Stevens (as Benjamin Carr)
- Produced by: Executive Producer: David DeFalco; Michael Feichtner; Co-Producer: Vlad Paunescu; Kirk Edward Hansen; Charles Band
- Starring: Michael Citriniti, Rhonda Griffin; Mel Johnson Jr. Jacqueline Lovell; Tracie May; Jerry O'Donnell; Andrew Johnston; Mircea Constantinescu; Alexandru Agarici
- Cinematography: Vlad Paunescu
- Edited by: Steven Nielson; Berry Taylor
- Music by: Richard Band
- Production company: Full Moon Entertainment
- Distributed by: The Kushner-Locke Company
- Release date: August 26, 1997
- Running time: 82 Minutes

Hideous! is a 1997 comedy horror film and monster movie, about several elite human oddity collectors and traders who find themselves locked in a castle with several mutated creatures come to life. The film combines live-action actors with rod puppetry creatures.

== Plot ==
Martin, a questionable water sanitation worker, finds a strange, fleshy organism in a water treatment tank and contacts Belinda Yost, seller of animal and human oddities at International Medical Specimens Inc. (IMSI). After speaking with Martin, Yost rushes out excitedly. She tells Elvina Shaw, her incompetent receptionist, to arrange a meeting with Mr. Napoleon Lazar, a high level corporate executive. Instead, Elvina calls Dr. Emilio Lorca, another oddities buyer, who pays extra for an exclusive “first look” at her new specimens. Elvina tells him Yost's plans. Lorca talks with his assistant, Sheila. Together they plot against Yost and Lazar's treachery. Yost meets Lazar in the cold storage level of IMSI, pays off Martin for the item, and secures a deal with Lazar: a check for $650,000 and a signed contract to spend a minimum of $200,000/year with her for the next 10 years.

On his way home, Lorca has Sheila ambush Lazar. She wears nothing but a miniskirt and a gorilla mask. Handcuffing Lazar to a tree, she steals the specimen, Sheila brings it back to Lorca's castle and into his study. Lorca places it in a jar with preserving liquid. He then places the jar on a shelf, with 3 other oddities. They are a few amongst many other grotesque creatures in jars. Sheila meanwhile destroys all evidence in an “acid bath” trapdoor within the castle. While Lorca dozes, the newest specimen reanimates the other 3 specimens. The new specimen is revealed to be an organism with an enlarged human head, deformed with two pairs of eyes and two mouths, one on top of the other, and a short torso. It sprouts several tentacles. The other 3 specimen include a large blob with a face sunken into its folds;, a stocky, brutish, muscular creature resembling a hairless ape; and a gaunt, skeletal creature with porcupine-like spines for hair.

Later, Lazar Yost, and Elvina seek out PI Leonard Kantor, to find the thief. After a few minutes of pressing Elvina, she admits to them that she informed Lorca about the sale. They go to Lorca's castle and Lorca strikes a deal with Lazar. Lazar questions the authenticity of the doctor's collection. Lorca bets that if he can impress Lazar with his collection, Lazar must agree to let him keep the specimen. Lazar agrees, and is initially impressed. When they enter Lorca's private study, they find the 4 jars broken and the specimens gone, leaving tracks to a vent shaft. Lorca locks down his castle with a special security system, while Sheila holds the four at gunpoint.

After no one will confess to taking the specimens, Lorca locks them in a closet and goes to search the castle. A tapping on the wall draws the prisoners' attention. Talking through the wall, they are able to guide “the tapper” (the specimens) with yes or no questions into prying open the locked door. Lorca returns and the four specimens are finally revealed to everyone.

When Yost goes to gather the specimens, she falls on the skeletal creature and is stuck with its spine-like hair. Meanwhile, the hairless ape creature attacks Sheila. The blob grabs the gun and shoots at the humans. They barricade themselves in a bedroom, for some time. Elvina is sleeping on the bed when the hairless ape creature sneaks under her blanket and begins breast feeding on her. She wakes and panics, running out of the room. She then trips and falls over a balcony railing to her death below.

The remaining five go below in search of the creatures. Lorca and Lazar each try luring the creatures, but they run off causing. The two men then face each in a sword fight. Yost triggers a boobytrap while trying to escape solo and is impaled. Lorca and Lazar's sword fight moves over the acid bath trapdoor. The hairless ape creature presses the button, causing both men to fall and dissolve in the acid.

Sheila uses the security override keycard to lure the specimens out onto a carpet, then uses the carpet to sweep them into the open acid bath. Sheila and Kantor leave in his car. They fail to see the bloody tracks leading up the ladder and out of the acid trap. As they drive off, the creatures are seen through the trunk's keyhole.

== Cast & Characters ==
- Michael Citriniti as Dr. Emilio Lorca, Private human oddities collector, inherited a massive fortune and castle
- Mel Johnson Jr. as Napoleon Lazar, a high level corporate executive and Private human oddities collector
- Jacqueline Lovell as Sheila, Lorca's personal assistant
- Tracie May as Belinda Yost, human oddities trader
- Rhonda Griffin as Elvina Shaw, Yost's incompetent receptionist.
- Jerry O'Donnell as Leonard Kantor, Private Investigator
- Andrew Johnston as Martin, Water sanitation employee, supplies Yost with specimens
- Mircea Constantinescu as Alf, sanitation worker working with Martin
- Alexandru Agarici as Dougie, sanitation worker working with Martin

== Production ==
The film was shot on location in Romania.

The film was covered in William Shatner’s FullMoon Fright Night in what William Shatner introduces as “a clammy, goosepimple-covered episode”, a reference to the grotesque-ness of the film's monsters. FullMoon Fright Night was a 13-episode television series hosted by William Shatner. It aired from August to October, 2002. Each episode screened a different film produced and/or directed by Charles Band throughout his career. It also featured 8–10 minutes in additional footage of Shatner and his mute, zombie bartender co-host sprinkled throughout. Its campy tone reflected the many humorous aspects and campiness of Band's films, while also relating bits of trivia on each film. For example, Shatner had this to say about Hideous! “Here’s a fun fact for you: the creatures in Hideous! are actually an ingenious combination of puppets and computer generated animation.”

The film's credits list the Copyright © 1997 Tanna Productions Inc.

== Release ==
The film was released on VHS and DVD in 1997, with audio commentary with actors Mel Johnson Jr. and Michael Citriniti, Videozone: "The Making of HIDEOUS!", cast filmographies, and 40 Full Moon trailers. It has since been re-released 3 times; twice on DVD in 2001 and 2003 and once on Blu-Ray in 2018.

== Reception ==
The film's IMDb page currently has 35 Reviews from critics published on various film review websites and blogs in multiple countries. They are generally mixed to negative.

TV Guide gave the film 1/4 stars in a review that cites the film's Romanian shooting locations as being its “most interesting” aspect and criticizes the film's script and monsters saying that while the dialogue may be semi-witty, exposition is repeated in an attempt to “pad the film to feature length”, and that the creatures are “barely convincing and barely articulated”.

Rotten Tomatoes currently only holds 1 published critic's review of the film, calling it “bizarre”, giving it a 1/4 or “Rotten“ (the site requires 5 published reviews before it assigns an official “recognized” score of fresh or rotten).

== Legacy ==
Michael Citriniti returned as Dr. Lorca in Demonic Toys 2 and the 2016 series Ravenwolf Towers. Dr. Lorca also appears in the fourth issue of Dollman Kills the Full Moon Universe, a crossover comic featuring Brick Bardo from Dollman tracking down different Full Moon monsters and villains to kill, published by Full Moon Comix in 2018.
