= Hideous (liqueur) =

Hideous is a berry- and citrus-flavored liqueur, produced by Hideous, L.C., a company based in the United States.

The liqueur is 70 proof (35% alcohol by volume), is magenta in color, and mildly sweet. The company promotes it to be consumed as a "shooter" (shot) as well as in mixed drinks, several recipes for which it has developed. It has been compared in flavor to the cocktail called a cosmopolitan.

The liqueur is made from potato and corn neutral spirit, with added natural flavors derived from berries grown in the state of Washington (including raspberries and other berries) and citrus fruits. The neutral spirit is produced at Distilled Resources Inc. in Rigby, Idaho, and Hideous is one of only four U.S. liqueur manufacturers to produce its own neutral spirit.

Hideous, L.C.'s owner and founder is Michael E. Klein, who is originally from New Orleans, Louisiana. He developed the brand while a student at the University of Texas at Austin. The company is incorporated in New Orleans, where its headquarters is located, but most of the company's business is conducted from its Austin, Texas office. The liqueur is currently available in the U.S. states of Georgia, Tennessee, Louisiana, Texas, Arkansas, Idaho, Montana, Washington, Wyoming, and Oregon.
