= Dollman vs. Demonic Toys =

- DVD release cover
- Directed by: Charles Band
- Screenplay by: Craig Hamann
- Story by: Charles Band
- Produced by: Charles Band
- Starring: Tim Thomerson; Tracy Scoggins; Melissa Behr; Phillip Brock; Phil Fondacaro; Willie C. Carpenter
- Cinematography: Adolfo Bartoli
- Edited by: Mark S. Manos
- Music by: Richard Band
- Production company: Full Moon Entertainment
- Distributed by: Paramount Home Video
- Release date: October 13, 1993
- Running time: 64 minutes
- Country: United States
- Language: English
- Budget: $350,000

Dollman vs. Demonic Toys (on screen title being Dollman vs. the Demonic Toys) is a 1993 American direct-to-video horror film. It is a continuation of three films released by Full Moon Features: Dollman, Demonic Toys and Bad Channels.

Much of the movie consists of flashbacks from the three previous movies, aimed to enhance the story and promote the earlier movies. This film was followed by Puppet Master vs. Demonic Toys in 2004 with alternate designs for the toys, which initially aired on Syfy. In 2010, a direct sequel to the first film titled Demonic Toys 2 was released.

== Plot ==
The film begins with Brick Bardo (Tim Thomerson from Dollman) hitchhiking to get to the town of Pahoota, where he tries to find a girl named Nurse Ginger Jones (Melissa Behr, playing her character from Bad Channels), to prove to her that she is not alone. Meanwhile, the film cuts to Judith Grey (Tracy Scoggins from Demonic Toys), who has a nightmare about the events that happened in the previous film a year before. Ever since the events that took place a year before, Judith has been watching the Arcadia Warehouse, believing that the toys are still alive. Meanwhile, a drunken bum enters the warehouse to shelter from the rain, and starts to mess around with a clown tricycle until he gets knocked in the head with a box of toys, causing him to hit his head on the ground, killing him. However, his blood continues to flow over to the place where the demon was buried and brings back Baby Oopsie Daisy, Jack Attack, and Mr. Static. Grizzly Teddy is replaced by a new toy Zombietoid, a blonde G.I. Joe action figure with a machete as a weapon.

Judith, who is now inside the building, sees the toys in full view, but is then arrested for breaking into a secluded building while serving out a suspension. After the police leave, the toys force the new security guard, Ray Vernon to help them with their needs. Ginger, who spends her time on a kitchen counter all alone, is being harassed by a sleazy reporter for an interview and so she reluctantly agrees so he'll leave her in peace. After he leaves, a big spider appears and as Ginger screams, Brick suddenly shows up and shoots it dead. Then a surprised Ginger asks Brick how he's so tiny like her, which results in both characters recapping their stories.

Meanwhile, Judith, who now knows about Nurse Ginger and Brick Bardo's history, bribes the news reporter to tell her where they are, and tells her they are in Pahoota. Judith, after having a deal with Bardo and Ginger to help her kill the toys, go to the warehouse and Ginger initially doesn't believe the tale about the toys being really alive. Meanwhile, the toys kill a blonde hooker and makes her bleed on the place, where the demon was buried. As Judith and friends enter the building, a fight begins, ending with Judith shooting Ray in the head, killing him before getting shot herself by Mr. Static, which then Brick blasts him to pieces. Brick, who has made a promise to Judith (cop to cop thing), continues to finish that promise, but Zombietoid knocks his gun out of his hand and it falls under a pile of crates, has his hands and feet tied to two toy trucks, and Ginger tied on to a clock when they are separated inside the ventilation shafts.

Baby Oopsie Daisy explains to Brick that once midnight strikes, the Demon's soul is going to go inside Baby Oopsie Daisy so he can rape Nurse Ginger, make the baby, eat its soul from the shell, and become a human. As Baby Oopsie Daisy is about to kill Brick, Ginger breaks free, cuts him loose, and gets carried away by Zombietoid, who continues to go after Brick. Brick and Zombietoid begin fighting, until Zombietoid's machete gets caught in an electric socket, killing him. After using a hockey stick to retrieve his gun, Brick continues on and finds Jack Attack, whom he kills by blasting Jack Attack's head to bloody smithereens, leaving only his torso intact.

Brick finally gets to the dollhouse shortly after the stroke of midnight and sees Baby Oopsie Daisy undressing Ginger in preparation for sex. Baby Oopsie Daisy demands Brick to drop his firearm or he will quickly kill Ginger with cervical dislocation. Brick complies and tosses his gun out of his reach. Baby Oopsie Daisy tries to penetrate Ginger, but is once again interrupted, this time due to a hard kick to his groin by Ginger after he unwittingly mentions that he is now possessed by The Master. The low blow causes her to be released from Baby Oopsy Daisy's grasp, giving Brick the opportunity to quickly summon his gun where he then fatally shoots the bewildered Baby Oopsie Daisy several times. Brick continues to call the police and tells them that Judith Grey died in the line of duty and leaves, along with Nurse Ginger, in a cab that is on its way back to Pahoota.

== Cast ==
- Tim Thomerson as Brick Bardo / Dollman
- Tracy Scoggins as Judith Grey
- Melissa Behr as Nurse Ginger Jones
- Phillip Brock as Collins
- Phil Fondacaro as Ray Vernon
- R.C. Bates as Bum
- Willie C. Carpenter as Police Officer
- Peter Chen as Cab Driver

=== Additional voices ===
- Frank Welker as Baby Oopsie Daisy
- 'Evil' Ted Smith as Zombietoid
- Tim Dornberg as Jack Attack
- Brigitte Lynn as Mr. Static

== Production ==
Dollman vs. Demonic Toys utilizes footage from the films Bad Channels and Dollman for flashback scenes throughout the movie.

The film's soundtrack primarily consists of songs by heavy metal band Quiet Riot from the band's 1993 album Terrified, with the album itself being released on Moonstone Records, the soundtrack offshoot of Charles Band's film company Full Moon Entertainment.

== Release ==
Dollman vs. Demonic Toys was released direct-to-video on VHS and Laserdisc on October 13, 1993. It was later given a DVD release in the 2005 box set "The Dollman / Demonic Toys Box Set" along with its two predecessors Demonic Toys and Dollman.

On November 9, 2010, Echo Bridge Home Entertainment released a triple feature set containing this film, Dollman and Demonic Toys.

The film was released on Blu-ray for the first time on Apr 21, 2015.

== Reception ==
Critical reception has been negative. Critic Dennis Fischer panned the film in his 2011 book covering science fiction directors as "one of Band's worst missteps". A reviewer for Billboard was more favorable, writing that "Good-humored viewers will enjoy this silly, but fast-moving quickie."

== See also ==
- List of films featuring miniature people
