= Krasnoludek =

Polish folk tale creature

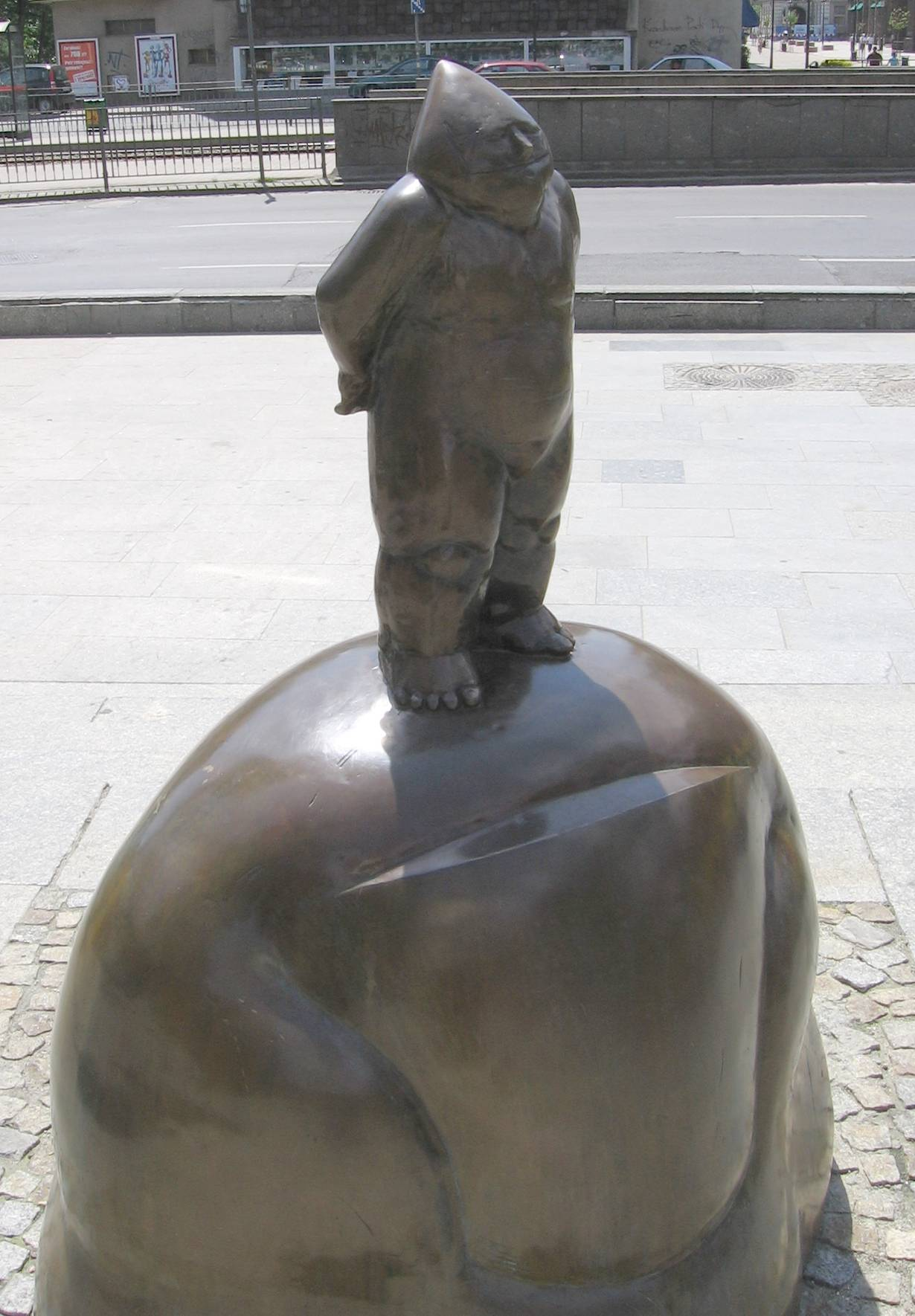
The monument to the Orange Alternative in Wrocław featuring its mascot, a krasnoludek dwarf, now one of many across the city.

Krasnoludek or krasnal is the Polish name for a mythological type of gnome or dwarf, common in many Polish and translated folk tales. They resemble small humans and wear pointy red hats.

The mythological dwarf is of Germanic origin and appeared in Polish folktales in the 16th or 17th century. The word krasnoludek comes from the old Polish krasny, kraśny ("red, colorful," "nice-looking," or "good") and Polish ludek (small person or human-like creature).

For example, the Brothers Grimm fairytale Snow White and the Seven Dwarfs is translated into the Polish language as Królewna Śnieżka i siedmiu krasnoludków. Due to the popularization of fantasy literature, they are now differentiated from both gnomes (Polish: gnom) and dwarfs (Polish: krasnolud), both of which are used in fantasy literature context, while the word krasnoludek still remains mostly the domain of older folk tales. The word krasnal ogrodowy is also used to describe garden gnomes.

In the city of Wrocław, a bronze statue honoring the Orange Alternative, an anti-communist social movement whose mascot is a krasnoludek dwarf, has inspired hundreds of other dwarf statues around the city that have since become a popular tourist attraction, the Wrocław Dwarfs.
