= Puppet Master (film series) =

American horror film series

- Created by: Charles Band; Kenneth J. Hall
- Original work: Puppet Master (1989)
- Owner: Full Moon Features
- Years: 1989-2022

Print publications
- Comics: List of comics

Films and television
- Films: List of films

Games
- Video game: Puppet Master: The Game (2023)

Puppet Master is an American horror media franchise created by Charles Band and Kenneth J. Hall. The films focus on a group of anthropomorphic puppets animated by an Egyptian spell, each equipped with its own unique and dangerous weapons and are represented as heroes, antiheroes and antagonists.

Produced by Full Moon Features, the series was established in 1989 with the eponymous first installment and has since been followed by five sequels, five prequels, a crossover with the characters of Demonic Toys, two spin-offs, a reboot, three comic book series', and a free-to-play multiplayer video game.

== Films ==
| Film | U.S. release date | Director(s) | Screenwriter(s) | Producer(s) |
|---|---|---|---|---|
| Puppet Master | October 12, 1989 | David Schmoeller | Kenneth J. Hall and David Schmoeller (as Joseph G. Collodi) | Charles Band; Hope Perello |
| Puppet Master II | November 17, 1990 | Dave Allen | David Pabian | Charles Band |
| Puppet Master III: Toulon's Revenge | October 17, 1991 | David DeCoteau | C. Courtney Joyner | Charles Band |
| Puppet Master 4 | November 24, 1993 | Jeff Burr | Steven E. Carr; Todd Henschell; Keith S. Payson; Jo Duffy; Douglas Aarniokoski | Charles Band |
| Puppet Master 5 | September 21, 1994 | Jeff Burr | Steven E. Carr; Todd Henschell; Keith S. Payson; Jo Duffy; Douglas Aarniokoski | Charles Band |
| Curse of the Puppet Master | May 26, 1998 | David DeCoteau (as Victoria Sloan) | Benjamin Carr | Charles Band; Gordon Gustafson; Kirk Edward Hansen |
| Retro Puppet Master | December 31, 1999 | David DeCoteau (as Joseph Tennent) | Benjamin Carr | Charles Band; Vlad Paunescu; Kirk Edward Hansen |
| Puppet Master: The Legacy | December 16, 2003 | Charles Band | C. Courtney Joyner (as Gene Yarbrough) | Charles Band |
| Puppet Master vs Demonic Toys | December 18, 2004 | Ted Nicolaou | C. Courtney Joyner | Alan Bursteen; Cary Glieberman |
| Puppet Master: Axis of Evil | July 27, 2010 | David DeCoteau | August White | Charles Band |
| Puppet Master X: Axis Rising | October 9, 2012 | Charles Band | Shane Bitterling | Charles Band |
| Puppet Master: Axis Termination | September 15, 2017 | Charles Band | Roger Barron | Charles Band |
| Puppet Master: The Littlest Reich | August 17, 2018 | Sonny Laguna and Tommy Wiklund | S. Craig Zahler | Lorenzo di Bonaventura; Mark Vahradian; Dallas Sonnier; Jack Heller |
| Blade: The Iron Cross | June 26, 2020 | John Lechago | Roger Barron | Charles Band |
| Puppet Master: Doktor Death | October 28, 2022 | Dave Parker | James Quinn | Charles Band; William Butler |

=== Development ===
Following the closure of his previous business venture, Empire Pictures, Charles Band relocated to the United States and founded Full Moon Productions. Band's goal with Full Moon was to create low-budget horror, science fiction and fantasy films that mirrored the quality of films with more generous budgets. After partnering with Paramount Pictures and Pioneer Home Entertainment, Full Moon began production on its first feature film, Puppet Master. Originally intended for a theatrical release in summer 1989, Puppet Master was ultimately pushed to a direct-to-video release on October 12, 1989, as Band felt he was likely to make more money this way than he would in the theatrical market.

The film proved to be successful, and would receive a sequel, Puppet Master II, in 1990, and a prequel, Puppet Master III: Toulon's Revenge, in 1991, the latter of which was the first installment to feature Guy Rolfe. Rolfe reprised the role of Toulon for three additional films. After his death in 2003, he posthumously appeared in The Legacy through extensive use of archival footage. In 1993 Full Moon began shooting another two sequels simultaneously, Puppet Master 4 and Puppet Master 5: The Final Chapter. The latter, as the title indicates, was intended to be the final installment of the series.

After the release of The Final Chapter in September 1994, Full Moon opted to retire Puppet Master and announced that a spin-off trilogy titled Puppet Wars would begin production in 1995. The spin-off trilogy was cancelled, leaving the series to continue its legacy through merchandising and a growing cult following.

Due to demand from video retailers and fans for a new installment, four years after retirement, the franchise was revived by the production of a sixth entry, Curse of the Puppet Master, in 1998. This was the first installment not to have David W. Allen involved with stop-motion special effects. By this time, Paramount had ended its deal with Full Moon, so the film used a combination of rod and string puppets, as well as archival footage to conserve costs. In September 1999, Full Moon Features released Totem, featuring characters similar to the Totems of the fourth film.

Also in 1999, a second prequel (taking place at an even earlier time than Toulon's Revenge) was released, titled Retro Puppet Master. The original idea for the seventh installment was for it to take place following Toulon's Revenge, with Toulon and his puppets escaping Germany by train, after which they are confronted by Nazis and demons. This idea was abandoned because the distributor, the Kushner Locke Company, thought it would offend the German audience, although it later formed the basis for the ninth installment of the series, Puppet Master: Axis of Evil. Retro Puppet Master was an anomaly to the series, in that the main theme composed by Richard Band was completely absent, and with its PG-13 rating, this was the first installment not to be rated R by the Motion Picture Association of America. The films following this would all fall under not rated.

An eighth entry, entitled The Legacy, was released in 2003, however only a fraction contains original footage; the remainder is archival footage used to summarize the series thus far. A year later, a crossover film featuring the animated playthings of Full Moon's Puppet Master and Demonic Toys series aired on Sci-Fi Channel, although it was said it did not take place in the same continuity as either of those franchises.

Puppet Wars promotional artwork

In 2005, Band alluded to a possible television series titled Puppet Wars and expressed interest in seeing a video game adaptation of the franchise developed. In June 2008, Band announced that a ninth installment of the series is planned, tentatively subtitled Axis of Evil. In March 2009, it was reported that Band is also interested in remaking 1989's Puppet Master in 3-D. Similarly, the original film was reissued by Razor Digital in 2007 in DualDisc format, featuring both standard and stereoscopic versions.

In June 2009, the Full Moon website posted updates about the latest installment, revealing the roster of puppets to be included, as well as principal cast members Levi Fiehler and Jerry Hoffman. Puppet Master: Axis of Evil was released on DVD, Blu-ray and streaming in 2010.

In 2012, Full Moon released the tenth installment, entitled Puppet Master X: Axis Rising, which continued the story and events from the previous film.

In 2017, Full Moon announced that Puppet Master: Axis Termination would debut exclusively on Full Moon Streaming in three parts starting in September 2017.

In 2018, a reboot was produced under the title Puppet Master: The Littlest Reich.

In 2020, a spin-off film revolving around the puppet Blade was released under the title Blade: The Iron Cross.

In 2022, a second spin-off film about Doktor Death (from Retro) was released as Puppet Master: Doktor Death.

In March 2023, a third spin-off centered around Leech Woman was announced with Puppet Master: Furnace Leech Woman. The status of the film is currently unknown after a series of delays and conflicting back-and-forth messages from the director and Full Moon suggesting it may have been cancelled or postponed.

In August 2026, it was reported that Blumhouse had secured a deal to produce a reboot film and a tv series.

== Cast and characters ==
| Character | Original series | | | | | | | | Crossover | Prequel series | | | Reboot | Spin-offs | |
| Character | Puppet Master | Puppet Master II | Puppet Master III: Toulon's Revenge | Puppet Master 4 | Puppet Master 5 | Curse of the Puppet Master | Retro Puppet Master | Puppet Master: The Legacy | Puppet Master vs. Demonic Toys | Puppet Master: Axis of Evil | Puppet Master X: Axis Rising | Puppet Master: Axis Termination | Puppet Master: The Littlest Reich | Blade: The Iron Cross | Puppet Master: Doktor Death |
| Character | 1989 | 1990 | 1991 | 1993 | 1994 | 1998 | 1999 | 2003 | 2004 | 2010 | 2012 | 2017 | 2018 | 2020 | 2022 |
|---|---|---|---|---|---|---|---|---|---|---|---|---|---|---|---|
| Blade | Bert Rosario^{V} | Bert Rosario^{V} | Bert Rosario^{V} | Bert Rosario^{V} | Bert Rosario^{V} | Bert Rosario^{V} | Bert Rosario^{V} | Bert Rosario^{V} | Bert Rosario^{V} | Bert Rosario^{V} | Bert Rosario^{V} | Bert Rosario^{V} | Bert Rosario^{V} | Bert Rosario^{V} | |
| André Toulon | William Hickey | Steve Welles | Guy Rolfe | Guy Rolfe | Guy Rolfe | | Guy Rolfe Greg Sestero^{Y} | Guy Rolfe Greg Sestero^{Y}^{A} | | William Hickey^{A} | | | Udo Kier | | Greg Sestero^{Y}^{A} |
| Alex Whitaker | Paul Le Mat | Mentioned | | | | | | | | | | | | | |
| Megan Gallagher | Robin Frates | Mentioned | | | | | | | | | | | | | |
| Dana Hadley | Irene Miracle | | | | | | | | | | | | | | |
| Frank Forrester | Matt Roe | | | | | | | | | | | | | | |
| Carissa Stamford | Kathryn O'Reilly | | | | | | | | | | | | | | |
| Neil Gallagher | Jimmie F. Skaggs | | | | | | | | | | | | | | |
| Carolyn Bramwel | | Elizabeth Maclellan | | | | | | | | | | | | | |
| Elsa Toulon | | Elizabeth Maclellan | Sarah Douglas | | | | Brigitta Dau | Brigitta Dau^{A} | Mentioned | | | | | | |
| Michael Kenney | | Collin Bernsen | | | | | | | | | | | | | |
| Patrick Bramwell | | Greg Webb | | | | | | | | | | | | | |
| Wanda | | Charlie Spradling | | | | | | | | | | | | | |
| Lance | | Jeff Weston | | | | | | | | | | | | | |
| Camille Kenney | | Nita Talbot | | | | | | | | | | | | | |
| Peter Hertz | | | Aron Eisenberg | | | | | | | | | | | | |
| Major Kraus | | | Richard Lynch | | | | | | | | | | | | |
| Dr.Hess | | | Ian Abercrombie | | | | | Ian Abercrombie^{A} | | | | | | | |
| Lieutenant Eric Stein | | | Kristopher Logan | | | | | | | | | | | | |
| General Mueller | | | Walter Gotell | | | | | | | | | | | | |
| Rick Meyers | | | | Gordon Currie | Gordon Currie | | | Gordon Currie^{A} | | | | | | | |
| Susie | | | | Chandra West | Chandra West | | | Chandra West^{A} | | | | | | | |
| Lauren | | | | Teresa Hill | Teresa Hill | | | Teresa Hill^{A} | | | | | | | |
| Cameron Phillips | | | | Jason Adams | Jason Adams^{A} | | | | | | | | | | |
| Dr.Carl Baler | | | | Felton Perry | | | | | | | | | | | |
| Dr.Leslie Piper | | | | Stacie Randall | | | | | | | | | | | |
| Jennings | | | | | Ian Ogilvy | | | | | | | | | | |
| Tom Hendy | | | | | Nicholas Guest | | | | | | | | | | |
| Jason | | | | | Willard Pugh | | | | | | | | | | |
| Scott | | | | | Duane Whitaker | | | | | | | | | | |
| Dr. Magrew | | | | | | George Peck | | George Peck^{A} | | | | | | | |
| Robert Winsley | | | | | | Josh Green | | Josh Green^{A} | | | | | | | |
| Jane Magrew | | | | | | Emily Harrison | | Emily Harrison^{A} | | | | | | | |
| Robert 'Tank' Winsley | | | | | | Josh Green | | | | | | | | | |
| Joey Carp | | | | | | Michael D. Guerin | | | | | | | | | |
| Art Cooney | | | | | | Marc Newburger | | | | | | | | | |
| Afzel | | | | | | | Jack Donner | Jack Donner | | | | | | | Jack Donner^{A} |
| Eric Weiss | | | | | | | | Jacob Witkin Peter Hertz^{A} | | | | | | | |
| Robert Toulon | | | | | | | | | Corey Feldman | | | | | | |
| Alexandra Toulon | | | | | | | | | Danielle Keaton | | | | | | |
| Erica Sharpe | | | | | | | | | Vanessa Angel | | | | | | |
| Jessica Ressell | | | | | | | | | Silvia Šuvadová | | | | | | |
| Danny Coogan | | | | | | | | | | Levi Fiehler | Kip Canyon | Kip Canyon | | | |
| Beth | | | | | | | | | | Jenna Gallagher | Jean Louise O'Sullivan | Jean Louise O'Sullivan | | | |
| Ozu | | | | | | | | | | Ada Chao Fang | Terumi Shimazu | | | | |
| Don Coogan | | | | | | | | | | Taylor M. Graham | | | | | |
| Ben Max | | | | | | | | | | Tom Sandoval | | | | | |
| Uncle Len | | | | | | | | | | Jerry Hoffman | | | | | |
| Elma Coogan | | | | | | | | | | Erica Shaffer | | | | | |
| Kommandant Moebius | | | | | | | | | | | Scott Anthony King | | | | |
| General Porter | | | | | | | | | | | Paul Thomas Arnold | | | | |
| Sergeant Stone | | | | | | | | | | | Brad Potts | | | | |
| Major Collins | | | | | | | | | | | Kurt Sinclair | | | | |
| Elisa Ivanov | | | | | | | | | | | | Tania Fox | | Tania Fox | |
| Edgar Easton | | | | | | | | | | | | | Thomas Lennon | | |
| Ashley Summers | | | | | | | | | | | | | Jenny Pellicer | | |
| Markowitz | | | | | | | | | | | | | Nelson Franklin | | |
| Nerissa | | | | | | | | | | | | | Lo Mutuc | | |
| Detective Brown | | | | | | | | | | | | | Michael Pare | | |
| Detective Lieutenant Jonas "Joe" Gray | | | | | | | | | | | | | | Vincent Cusimano | |
| Gloria | | | | | | | | | | | | | | Angelica Briones | |
| Barney | | | | | | | | | | | | | | Griffin Blazi | |
| Erich Hauser | | | | | | | | | | | | | | Roy Abramsohn | |
| James D. Madison | | | | | | | | | | | | | | Todd Gajdusek | |
| April | | | | | | | | | | | | | | | Jenny Boswell |
| Ryan | | | | | | | | | | | | | | | Chad Patterson |
| Jennifer | | | | | | | | | | | | | | | Emily Sue Bengtson |
| Carmen | | | | | | | | | | | | | | | Erin Eva Butcher |
| Gladys | | | | | | | | | | | | | | | Melissa Moore |
| Dr. Lantmen | | | | | | | | | | | | | | | Ashton Wolf |

=== Puppets ===
| Puppet | Puppet Master | Puppet Master II | Toulon's Revenge | Puppet Master 4 | Puppet Master 5 | Curse of the | Retro | The Legacy | vs. Demonic Toys | Axis of Evil | Axis Rising | Axis Termination | The Littlest Reich | Blade: The Iron Cross | Puppet Master: Doktor Death |
|---|---|---|---|---|---|---|---|---|---|---|---|---|---|---|---|
| Blade | ✓ | ✓ | ✓ | ✓ | ✓ | ✓ | ✓ | ✓ | ✓ | ✓ | ✓ | ✓ | ✓ | ✓ | ✗ |
| Pinhead | ✓ | ✓ | ✓ | ✓ | ✓ | ✓ | ✓ | ✓ | ✓ | ✓ | ✓ | ✓ | ✓ | ✓ | ✗ |
| Jester | ✓ | ✓ | ✓ | ✓ | ✓ | ✓ | ✓ | ✓ | ✓ | ✓ | ✓ | ✓ | ✗ | ✗ | ✗ |
| Tunneler | ✓ | ✓ | ✓ | ✓ | ✓ | ✓ | ✓ | ✓ | ✗ | ✓ | ✓ | ✓ | ✓ | ✓ | ✗ |
| Six Shooter | ✗ | ✗ | ✓ | ✓ | ✓ | ✓ | ✓ | ✓ | ✓ | Arms and Credits Only | ✓ | ✓ | ✗ | ✓ | ✗ |
| Leech Woman | ✓ | ✓ | ✓ | ✗ | ✗ | ✓ | ✓ | Archival Footage | ✗ | ✓ | ✓ | ✓ | ✗ | ✗ | ✗ |
| Torch | ✗ | ✓ | ✗ | Poster Only | ✓ | ✗ | ✗ | Archival Footage | ✗ | Credits Only | ✗ | ✗ | ✓ | ✗ | ✗ |
| Decapitron | ✗ | ✗ | ✗ | ✓ | ✓ | ✗ | ✗ | Archival Footage | ✗ | ✗ | ✗ | ✗ | ✗ | ✗ | ✗ |
| Djinn | ✗ | ✓ | ✓ | ✗ | ✗ | ✗ | ✗ | Archival Footage | ✗ | ✗ | ✗ | ✗ | ✗ | ✗ | ✗ |
| Gengie | ✓ | ✗ | ✗ | ✗ | ✗ | ✗ | ✗ | ✗ | ✗ | ✓ | ✗ | ✗ | ✗ | ✗ | ✗ |
| Shreddar Khan | ✓ | ✗ | ✗ | ✗ | ✗ | ✗ | ✗ | ✗ | ✗ | ✓ | ✗ | ✗ | ✗ | ✗ | ✗ |
| Mephisto | ✗ | ✓ | ✓ | Toulon Poster Only | ✗ | ✗ | ✗ | ✗ | ✗ | ✗ | ✗ | ✗ | ✗ | ✗ | ✗ |
| Dr. Death | ✗ | ✗ | ✗ | ✗ | ✗ | ✗ | ✓ | Archival Footage | ✗ | ✗ | ✗ | ✗ | ✗ | ✗ | ✓ |
| Drill Sergeant | ✗ | ✗ | ✗ | ✗ | ✗ | ✗ | ✓ | Archival Footage | ✗ | ✗ | Head Only | ✗ | ✗ | ✗ | ✗ |
| Cyclops | ✗ | ✗ | ✗ | ✗ | ✗ | ✗ | ✓ | Archival Footage | ✗ | ✗ | ✗ | ✗ | ✗ | ✗ | ✗ |
| Retro-Blade | ✗ | ✗ | ✗ | ✗ | ✗ | ✗ | ✓ | Archival Footage | ✗ | ✗ | ✗ | ✗ | ✗ | ✗ | ✗ |
| Retro-Pinhead | ✗ | ✗ | ✗ | ✗ | ✗ | ✗ | ✓ | Archival Footage | ✗ | ✗ | ✗ | ✗ | ✗ | ✗ | ✗ |
| Retro-Six-Shooter | ✗ | ✗ | ✗ | ✗ | ✗ | ✗ | ✓ | Archival Footage | ✗ | ✗ | ✗ | ✗ | ✗ | ✗ | ✗ |
| Tank | ✗ | ✗ | ✗ | ✗ | ✗ | ✓ | ✗ | Archival Footage | ✗ | ✗ | ✗ | ✗ | ✗ | ✗ | ✗ |
| Matt/Mutant | ✗ | ✗ | ✗ | ✗ | ✗ | ✓ | ✗ | ✗ | ✗ | ✗ | ✗ | ✗ | ✗ | ✗ | ✗ |
| Ninja | ✗ | ✗ | ✗ | ✗ | ✗ | ✗ | ✗ | ✗ | ✗ | ✓ | Mentioned | ✗ | ✗ | ✗ | ✗ |
| Blitzkrieg | ✗ | ✗ | ✗ | ✗ | ✗ | ✗ | ✗ | ✗ | ✗ | ✗ | ✓ | ✓ | ✗ | ✗ | ✗ |
| Bombshell | ✗ | ✗ | ✗ | ✗ | ✗ | ✗ | ✗ | ✗ | ✗ | ✗ | ✓ | ✓ | ✗ | ✗ | ✗ |
| Kamikaze | ✗ | ✗ | ✗ | ✗ | ✗ | ✗ | ✗ | ✗ | ✗ | ✗ | ✓ | ✗ | ✗ | ✗ | ✗ |
| Weremacht | ✗ | ✗ | ✗ | ✗ | ✗ | ✗ | ✗ | ✗ | ✗ | ✗ | ✓ | ✓ | ✗ | ✗ | ✗ |
| Happy Amphibian | ✗ | ✗ | ✗ | ✗ | ✗ | ✗ | ✗ | ✗ | ✗ | ✗ | ✗ | ✗ | ✓ | ✗ | ✗ |

== Reception ==
The most well-received Puppet Master installments are generally those released before the series' four-year hiatus. As the series was revived at a time when Full Moon Features was no longer partnered with Paramount Pictures, the studio's finances grew increasingly tight, and as a result, the quality of each subsequent Puppet Master title (as well as numerous other Full Moon productions) suffered. On Rotten Tomatoes, the only two installments that have been rated by critics are Puppet Master, which has a 43% rating out of 7 reviews, and Puppet Master II, which has a 33% rating out of 6 reviews. The films have scored slightly higher with audiences, rating 51% and 47%, respectively.

== Home media ==
=== VHS ===
Most Puppet Master films were originally released direct to video on VHS.

=== DVD ===
The Puppet Master films have been released on DVD in very small quantities. A box set containing the first seven installments of the series was released by Full Moon (along with a bonus disc of trailers for other Full Moon films), but was recalled shortly after. However, in 2007, Full Moon Features reacquired the rights to the first five films, and the box set has since been reissued and is available directly from Full Moon, as well as through several online retailers. The first three films were included as part of an 18-disc Full Moon Features collection, and have since been individually released as a Spanish-subtitled import collection. In 2007, Razor Digital released an uncut DualDisc version of the first film, featuring both the standard and stereoscopic versions of the film, but with very poor picture quality. In 2012, Echo Bridge home entertainment released all 9 films in one DVD collection, while the first three films were licensed for a UK release by 88 Films.

Starting in 2010, the first Puppet Master was re-released on DVD with a new remastered widescreen transfer, while the second and third films were released with new transfers on September 18, 2012 (both individually or in a box set with the first film). The remastered editions of the fourth and fifth films were released on March 24, 2016, but only through a box set which is identical to Full Moon's original set with the bonus disc of trailers, except they also contain the remastered editions of the first 3 films (Curse of the Puppet Master and Retro Puppet Master still remain unrestored).

=== Blu-ray ===
The original Puppet Master film was released on Blu-ray in a remastered widescreen transfer on July 27, 2010. On September 18, 2012, the first three films were released on Blu-ray in a set, the second and third films also remastered in widescreen.

The fourth installment was released on Blu-ray October 12, 2015, while the fifth installment was released on February 1, 2016.

In the UK, 88 Films released Blu-rays of the first three films in 2012, with the fourth and fifth films following in 2016.

In 2018, the first eleven official films in the series, comprising Puppet Master through Puppet Master: Axis Termination, were released as a limited edition Blu-ray set, encased in a wood and metal box designed after André Toulon's trunk. The set also contained an extra disc containing supplements related to the film series and a small figure of the puppet character Blade.

In early 2020, a Blu-ray box set containing the same contents as the previous set, minus the special packaging and Blade figure, was released via Full Moon's retail website.

=== Digital ===
In December 2008, Charles Band authorized the first Puppet Master film for digital download through the iTunes Store; his first foray into the digital market.

For the first time in the series, Puppet Master: Axis Termination debuted digitally on Full Moon's Amazon channel in three parts beginning on September 15, 2017.

=== Streaming ===
As a part of Full Moon Features's Streaming App, the entire Puppet Master catalog was made available to stream as well as the Full Moon Amazon Channel.

== Other media ==
=== Comics ===
A four-issue comic book limited series titled The Puppet Master Adventure was written and drawn by Australian comic book creators Dave de Vries and Glenn Lumsden and printed by Eternity Comics. It was followed by a two-issue sequel titled Children of the Puppet Master also by de Vries and Lumsden.

An ongoing comic book series titled Puppet Master was written by Shawn Gabborin and published by Action Lab Comics begun in 2015. The series was an instant hit among fans and is known for its attention to detail regarding the Puppet Master lore.

A one-shot comic released as a tie-in with Blade: The Iron Cross, published by Full Moon Comix. Despite the title, the story takes place after the events of Puppet Master III.

=== Video game ===
An official video game adaptation had been in development by October Games as early as 2012. In September 2021, Full Moon released a first look trailer for the game, which was announced to be titled Puppet Master: The Game. Exclusive gameplay for the game was shown in Baby Oopsie. Early access for the game released in late 2022 on Steam and was officially released free-to-play on March 1, 2023.
