= Dollman (film) =

1991 American film by Albert Pyun

- Poster artwork
- Directed by: Albert Pyun
- Written by: Charles Band; David Pabian; Chris Roghair
- Produced by: Cathy Gesualdo
- Starring: Tim Thomerson; Jackie Earle Haley; Kamala Lopez; Humberto Ortiz; Nicholas Guest; Judd Omen
- Cinematography: George Mooradian
- Edited by: Margaret-Anne Smith
- Music by: Anthony Riparetti
- Production company: Full Moon Entertainment
- Distributed by: Paramount Home Video
- Release date: November 27, 1991
- Running time: 79 minutes
- Country: United States
- Languages: English; Spanish

Dollman is a 1991 American science fiction action horror film directed by Albert Pyun and starring Tim Thomerson as the space cop Brick Bardo, also known as "Dollman" due to his being 13 inches (33 cm) tall. Bardo is equipped with his "Kruger Blaster", which is the most powerful handgun in the universe. The film also stars Jackie Earle Haley as Bardo's human enemy, Braxton Red. "Brick Bardo" is a character name used by Albert Pyun in films dating back to his second film, Radioactive Dreams.

The film was produced by Full Moon Features, who also worked with Thomerson on the Trancers series. It was followed by a crossover sequel in 1993 called Dollman vs. Demonic Toys, which is also a sequel to Demonic Toys (1992) and Bad Channels (1992).

Dollman also had its own comic series published by Eternity Comics, who also made comics for other Full Moon films.

== Plot ==
On Arturos (a dystopian planet populated by humans that are six times smaller than that of Earth), a criminal takes hostages at a laundry. The crook is surprised when cop Brick Bardo defiantly enters to do his laundry. Bardo causes the overweight hostages to faint and pin down the criminal when he threatens to shoot through their bodies with his powerful weapon. Although he saves the hostages, Bardo, already suspended for his violent methods, faces further criticism from the mayor. News segments also air claiming he killed multiple hostages.

Bardo is ambushed and kidnapped. After Bardo wakes up on a desert plain, his greatest enemy, Sprug, reveals he intends to kill Bardo with his own blaster, which Bardo had used to reduce Sprug to a floating head. Bardo uses a magnetic field to retrieve his blaster and kills Sprug's henchmen. Sprug escapes in his ship, and Bardo follows. Sprug and Bardo pass through an energy band, which sends them to Earth.

In the Bronx, New York City, Braxton Red and his gang run their neighborhood and kill any gangsters who intrude. Debi, a young Hispanic single mother, wants the police to do more. When Debi goes home, gangsters who know about her meddling – Hector, Wick, and Jackson – capture and threaten her. Before they can kill her, Bardo wounds Hector and kills Wick. Hector and Jackson run off, leaving Debi to wonder whether she is hallucinating. As she takes Bardo and his ship away, Braxton Red and his right hand man Armbruiser spot Sprug. Sprug says he has a powerful bomb they can use in exchange for helping to repair his ship.

Debi introduces Bardo to her excited son, Kevin. At the hideout, Braxton kills Hector in a fit of rage when Jackson says it was his idea to kill Debi. Braxton disbelieves that a doll-sized man could hurt anybody, but he takes Jackson and several other gangsters with him to Debi's place to find the alleged Dollman. Bardo kills all of the gangsters except Braxton, who is seriously injured while fleeing. Sprug recognizes Bardo's handiwork. After Braxton agrees to his demands, Sprug partially heals his injuries. When Sprug insists on taking over the gang, Braxton squashes Sprug. Though still wounded, Braxton resolves to kill Bardo.

Bardo overhears a commotion outside the apartment when Debi comes home from work. As Braxton and Armbruiser kidnap Debi, Bardo leaps out of a window and grabs onto their car as it speeds off. Bardo follows the gang to where the spaceships landed, where they plan to ambush him. Bardo uses an underground passage to surprise the gangsters and rescue Debi. A shootout ensues, and Bardo kills most of the gangsters by exploding their vehicles. Debi runs off, and Braxton follows. Feeling disrespected for keeping her alive for years, Braxton is about to shoot Debi, but Bardo distracts him and shoots off one of his arms. Debi stops Bardo from killing Braxton. Braxton uses Sprug's bomb as a last resort murder-suicide, and Debi and Bardo run for cover. Debi, after seeing that Bardo is safe, smiles, and Bardo asks her if size counts.

== Cast ==
- Tim Thomerson as Brick Bardo / Dollman
- Jackie Earle Haley as Braxton Red
- Kamala Lopez as Debi Alejandro
- Humberto Ortiz as Kevin Alejandro
- Nicholas Guest as Skyresh
- Judd Omen as The Mayor
- Michael Halsey as Cally
- Frank Doubleday as Cloy
- Eugene Glazer as Captain Shuller
- Frank Collison as Sprug

== Crossover ==
The Dollman character has a post credits cameo in Bad Channels, where he is searching for a girl called Bunny, who was shrunk to be about his size. This is changed to Ginger through editing in the next film, 1993's Dollman vs. Demonic Toys. That crossover sequel uses a lot of archive footage to tell the back story of the various characters. It pits Bardo against four evil toys in a warehouse, who are trying to resurrect their demon master. Bardo even gets himself a girlfriend called Ginger (a similarly shrunken nurse, returning from the movie Bad Channels) and they help a normal sized police officer called Judith Gray to deal with the demonic toys once more, having already dealt with the nasty playthings before, in Demonic Toys.

== Canceled sequel ==
In 1999, Charles Band mentioned the possibility of another Dollman film in Retro Puppet Master's Videozone. This project never materialized.

== TV pilot ==
In 1993, Full Moon Features teamed with NBC to produce a TV pilot for a Dollman television series to potentially premiere during the 1993–94 Fall schedule. NBC ultimately passed on the series.

== Home media ==
Dollman made its DVD debut in the 2005 box set "The Dollman/Demonic Toys Box Set". The film was also featured in the limited-edition boxed set "Full Moon Features: The Archive Collection", a 20th anniversary collection which featured 18 of Full Moon's most popular films.

On November 9, 2010, Echo Bridge Home Entertainment released a triple feature set containing this film, Demonic Toys and Dollman vs. Demonic Toys.

Dollman was released on Blu-ray in the US on December 17, 2013, by Full Moon Entertainment.

== Merchandising ==
- A four-issue comic book limited series printed by Eternity Comics.
- A six-issue crossover comic titled Dollman Kills the Full Moon Universe, printed by Full Moon Comix
- A set of collectible cards.

== Reception ==
Steve Simels of Entertainment Weekly rated it C+ and wrote, "Unfortunately, while there's enough gross shoot-out stuff to mollify genre fans, the picture's miniature effects are mostly laughable." Commenting on its strange mix of genres, TV Guide rated it 3/5 stars and wrote "this droll and skillful effort merits a guarded nod".

== See also ==
- List of films featuring miniature people
