= Demonic Toys =

- Theatrical release poster
- Directed by: Peter Manoogian
- Written by: David S. Goyer
- Produced by: Charles Band; Anne Kelly
- Starring: Tracy Scoggins; Bentley Mitchum; Michael Russo; Jeff Weston; Daniel Cerny
- Cinematography: Adolfo Bartoli
- Edited by: Andy Horvitch
- Music by: Richard Band
- Production company: Full Moon Entertainment
- Distributed by: Paramount Home Video; Pioneer Home Entertainment
- Release date: March 12, 1992
- Running time: 83 minutes
- Country: United States
- Language: English
- Budget: $2 million

Demonic Toys is a 1992 American direct-to-video horror comedy film produced by Charles Band's Full Moon Entertainment and directed by Peter Manoogian. The film centers on a police officer who is terrorized by the title characters after a botched arrest. Like many other Full Moon releases, Demonic Toys never had a theatrical release and went straight-to-video in 1992. In the United States, the film was given an "R" rating for violence, language, and brief nudity.

== Plot ==
Judith Gray and Matt Cable—two police officers who are dating—wait at the Toyland Warehouse to arrest illegal gun dealers Lincoln and Hesse. Judith tells Matt about a strange dream she has been having: two boys—one good, one bad—playing war. She also reveals that she is pregnant. The confrontation with the gun dealers ends with Matt shooting Hesse, and Lincoln killing Matt. Lincoln and Hesse hide inside the Toyland Warehouse and split up; Judith goes after Lincoln.

In the security office, security guard Charneski places an order at a chicken delivery service run by his friend Mark Wayne. Mark arrives at the warehouse with Charneski's order. Meanwhile, the toys that surround a dying Hesse come to life and brutally murder him. Judith and Lincoln become locked inside the storage closet but are freed by Mark and Charneski. Charneski goes to call the police, but is also graphically murdered by the toys, with Mark and Judith watching in horror. A toy named Baby Oopsy Daisy draws a pentagram around Charneski's corpse.

A runaway named Anne, who had been hiding in the air-conditioner shafts, joins the group. Mark explains that the doors do not open until morning but can be opened up from the office. Judith cannot leave Lincoln as she has to bring him in, so Mark and Anne head to the office together. They are attacked by Mr. Static and Baby Oopsy Daisy. Mark fights back, but Baby Oopsy Daisy kills Anne. Mark finally shoots Jack Attack's head off with Charneski's shotgun. Judith enters a dollhouse and is transported to the lair of a kid who reveals that he is a spirit of a demon who wants to become human. In order to do that, he has to impregnate a woman so that his soul can transfer into the woman's unborn child, where he has to eat the baby's soul and take over its shell. If the baby does not survive the birth, he has to be buried like a seed, and, once grown, he will start the process over again. The last time he was born was 66 years prior, on Halloween night, 1925. The baby did not survive the birth so he was buried underneath the warehouse, unable to get out until Hesse bled onto the area.

Lincoln escapes while Judith is in the dollhouse. He catches up to Mark and is about to kill him when Judith appears and shoots Lincoln in the head. Suddenly, all of the toys around them come to life. The pair begin shooting them to death, including Baby Oopsy Daisy. Grizzly Teddy turns into a man-sized monster and chases after Judith. Judith becomes trapped and is about to shoot herself when a toy soldier helps her escape. However, Judith is caught by the demon who ties her up on the pentagram. Mark is attacked by Grizzly Teddy, but manages to kill the monster. The demon, now in the form of a man, is about to rape Judith, but the toy soldier shoots it, cuts Judith free, and turns into a real boy. The demon transforms back into his own kid form, and the two kids begin fighting, explaining the war card game from Judith's dream. As the demon is about to kill the boy soldier, Judith stabs him with the boy soldier's sword and the demon is sent back to Hell. Before heading back to Heaven, the boy soldier reveals that he's the spirit of the son she's going to have. Judith reunites with Mark and the two wait for the doors of the warehouse to open and let them go.

== Cast ==
- Tracy Scoggins as Judith Gray
- Bentley Mitchum as Mark Wayne
- Daniel Cerny as "The Kid"
- Michael Russo as Lincoln
- Barry Lynch as Hesse
- Ellen Dunning as Anne
- Pete Schrum as Charnetski
- Jeff Weston as Matt Cable
- William Thorne as Fair-Haired Boy
- Richard Speight Jr. as Andy
- Larry Cedar as Peterson
- Jim Mercer as Dr. Michaels
- Pat Crawford Brown as Mrs. Michaels
- Christopher Robin as Skeleton Kid
- Kristine Rose as Miss July
- Robert Stockele as Man-Devil
- Crystal Carlson as Little Girl
- June C. Ellis as Old Woman

=== Additional voices ===
- Linda O. Cook as Baby Oopsy Daisy
- Edwin Cook as Grizzly Teddy
- Tim Dornberg as Jack Attack
- Brigitte Lynn as Mr. Static

== Production ==
=== Development and filming ===
Charles Band offered David S. Goyer a deal where if Goyer wrote two films for Band's Full Moon Entertainment, he would get to direct one. Goyer wrote the script for one film, originally titled Dangerous Toys, in eight days, but got cold feet and backed out of directing the film. Band hired Peter Manoogian to direct the film while he was working on Seedpeople. Anne Kelly co-produced the film with Band. The film was shot in July 1991.

Dangerous Toys was first announced in the Videozone for Trancers II in 1991, as well as the Puppet Master III: Toulon's Revenge Videozone. The title was reportedly changed to Demonic Toys after Full Moon received a cease and desist letter from a rock band of the same name.

=== Casting ===
Actors and actresses cast for the film included Tracy Scoggins, Bentley Mitchum, Daniel Cerny, Michael Russo, Barry Lynch, Ellen Dunning, Pete Schrum, Jeff Weston, William Thorne, Richard Speight Jr., Larry Cedar, Jim Mercer, Pat Crawford Brown, Christopher Robin, Kristine Rose, Robert Stockele, Crystal Carlson, and June C. Ellis. Demonic Toys was Dunning's last acting role before retiring. The toys' voices were provided by Linda O. Cook (Baby Oopsy Daisy), Edwin Cook (Grizzly Teddy), Tim Dornberg (Jack Attack), and Brigitte Lynn (Mr. Static).

=== Special effects ===
The special effects and makeup effects were done by John Carl Buechler, Rodd Matsui (both of whom also created the toy puppets), Dennis Gordon, Harvey Mayo, Kevin McCarthy, Phil Meador, Mark Rappaport, Richard Snell, and Michael Deak at Magical Media Industries. The stop motion animation for the toy blocks and toy soldier was done by David W. Allen, Yancy Calzada and Chris Endicott.

== Release ==
Demonic Toys was released direct to video on VHS by Paramount Home Video and LaserDisc by Pioneer Home Entertainment on March 12, 1992. In the United Kingdom, the film was released by Entertainment in Video in July of that year. The film was released by Full Moon on DVD in 2012 and Blu-ray in 2014.

== Reception ==
Critical reception for Demonic Toys has been mostly negative. TV Guide awarded the film one out of a possible four stars. The reviewer criticized the film for its hackneyed story and unimaginative creatures, calling it "a rehash of the company's Puppet Master series". VideoHound's Golden Movie Retriever gave the film a score of one-and-a-half out of a possible four, calling it "skimpily scripted". J.R. McNamara of Digital Retribution panned the film, criticizing the film's weak script, and poor acting. Author Clive Davies called the film "[a] typically dumb Full Moon comedy horror".

Conversely, Felix Vasquez Jr. of Cinema Crazed.com gave the film a positive review, writing: "Demonic Toys is a schlocky and campy bit of terror fare and one that I fondly enjoyed as a first time experience. Plus, you have to appreciate the commitment of Daniel Cerny as the evil kid of the piece who is never above terrorizing and taunting his victims like a Mini-Krueger before sending his toys at his human hosts." Zach Gass of Screen Rant praised the film's utilization of special effects and puppetry, and added that the film's direct-to-video release gained it a cult following.

== Other media ==
=== Sequel ===
A direct sequel, Demonic Toys 2, was released in 2010.

=== Crossovers ===
A crossover, Dollman vs. Demonic Toys, was released in 1993. It was followed by a second crossover in 2004, Puppet Master vs Demonic Toys.

=== Spin-off ===
A trilogy of spin-offs titled Baby Oopsie, Baby Oopsie 2: Murder Dolls and Baby Oopsie 3: Burn Baby Burn, were released in 2021 and 2022 (note: some sources list the movies as a television series). An eighth film, titled Demonic Toys: Jack-Attack, was released in 2023.

== See also ==
- Killer toy
