= List of works featuring killer toys =

Killer toys are fictional characters based on toys, dolls or puppets that come alive and commit violent or scary acts. Reasons for these actions have included possession by demons, devils, monsters, ghosts, supernatural creatures, dark magic, and malevolent or malfunctioning technology.

== List of films ==
The films that feature killer toys are listed as follows:

Film	Year	Rating (Rotten Tomatoes)	Reference
The Devil-Doll	1936	79% (19 reviews)	
Dead of Night	1945	93% (44 reviews)	
Attack of the Puppet People	1958	No score yet (1 review)	
The Curse of the Doll People	1961	No critic reviews yet	
Devil Doll	1964	33% (6 reviews)	
House of Evil	1968	No critic reviews yet	
Barbarella	1968	74% (46 reviews)	
A Reflection of Fear	1972	No critic reviews yet	
Asylum	1972	67% (12 reviews)	
From Beyond the Grave	1974	60% (5 reviews)	
Craze	1974	No score yet (2 reviews)	
Patayin Mo Sa Sindak Si Barbara	1974		
Trilogy of Terror	1975	92% (12 reviews)	
Cathy's Curse	1977	No critic reviews yet	
The Wiz	1978	41% (34 reviews)	
Magic	1978	86% (21 reviews)	
Tourist Trap	1979	40% (5 reviews)	
The Pit	1981	No score yet (4 reviews)	
Poltergeist	1982	86% (63 reviews)	
Curtains	1983	57% (7 reviews)	
Xtro	1983	40% (10 reviews)	
Black Devil Doll From Hell	1984	No critic reviews yet	
The Devil's Gift	1984	No critic reviews yet	
Joey (a.k.a. Making Contact)	1985	No critic reviews yet	
Dolls	1987	60% (15 reviews)	
GhostHouse (a.k.a. La Casa 3)	1988	No score yet (1 review)	
Child's Play	1988	71% (48 reviews)	
Pin	1988	No critic reviews yet	
Puppet Master	1989	43% (7 reviews)	
Child's Play 2	1990	40% (15 reviews)	
Puppet Master II	1991	33% (6 reviews)	
Child's Play 3	1991	23% (13 reviews)	
Puppet Master III: Toulon's Revenge	1991	No score yet (3 reviews)	
Dolly Dearest	1991	No score yet (4 reviews)	
Silent Night, Deadly Night 5: The Toy Maker	1991	No score yet (1 review)	
Dollman	1991	No score yet (4 reviews)	
Demonic Toys	1992	No score yet (4 reviews)	
Curse, Death & Spirit (a.k.a. Honto ni atta kowai hanashi: Jushiryou)	1992	No critic reviews yet	
Dollman vs. Demonic Toys	1993	No score yet (3 reviews)	
Puppet Master 4	1993	0% (4 reviews)	
Puppet Master 5	1994	No score yet (2 reviews)	
The Fear	1995	No score yet (1 review)	
Tales from the Hood	1995	50% (20 reviews)	
Patayin sa Sindak Si Barbara	1995		
Doll from Hell (a.k.a. Ikenie)	1996	No critic reviews yet	
Amityville Dollhouse	1996	No score yet (2 reviews)	
Merlin's Shop of Mystical Wonders	1996	No score yet (1 review)	
Pinocchio's Revenge	1996	No score yet (4 reviews)	
Trilogy of Terror II	1996	No critic reviews yet	
Shadow Zone: My Teacher Ate My Homework	1997	No score yet	
Quicksilver Highway	1997	No score yet (3 reviews)	
Curse of the Puppet Master	1998	No score yet (2 reviews)	
Small Soldiers	1998	48% (44 reviews)	
Bride of Chucky	1998	49% (39 reviews)	
The Fear: Resurrection	1999	No critic reviews yet	
Blood Dolls	1999	No score yet (1 review)	
Totem	1999	No critic reviews yet	
Retro Puppet Master	1999	No score yet (2 reviews)	
Ragdoll	1999	No critic reviews yet	
The Dummy	2000	No critic reviews yet	
May	2002	69% (68 reviews)	
Demon Island	2002	No score yet (1 review)	
Terror Toons	2002	No score yet (1 review)	
Love Object	2003	40% (25 reviews)	
Puppet Master: The Legacy	2003	No score yet (1 review)	
Doll Master (a.k.a. Inhyeongsa)	2004	No critic reviews yet	
Seed of Chucky	2004	34% (77 reviews)	
Puppet Master vs Demonic Toys	2004	No score yet (1 review)	
Marronnier	2004	No score yet... (2 reviews)	
When Puppets and Dolls Attack!	2004	No critic reviews yet...	
Doll Graveyard	2005	No score yet... (3 reviews)	
Tiki	2006	No critic reviews yet...	
Dead Silence	2007	21% (76 reviews)	
Terror Toons 2: The Sick and Silly Show	2007	No critic reviews yet...	
Black Devil Doll	2007	No score yet... (3 reviews)	
Dangerous Worry Dolls	2008	No score yet... (1 review)	
Triloquist	2008	No score yet... (2 reviews)	
Puppet Show	2008	No critic reviews yet...	
Skull Heads	2009	No score yet... (2 reviews)	
The Hole	2009	81% (36 reviews)	
Demonic Toys 2 (a.k.a. Demonic Toys: Personal Demons)	2010	No score yet... (1 review)	
Puppet Master: Axis of Evil	2010	No score yet... (1 review)	
Shake, Rattle & Roll 12 (Segment: Mamanyiika)	2010	No critic reviews yet	
Puppet Master X: Axis Rising	2012	No score yet (1 review)	
Ooga Booga	2013	No score yet (2 reviews)	
The Conjuring	2013	86% (223 reviews)	
Curse of Chucky	2013	76% (21 reviews)	
Maria Leonora Teresa	2014	No critic reviews yet	
Finders Keepers	2014	No critic reviews yet	
Annabelle	2014	29% (134 reviews)	
Poltergeist	2015	30% (135 reviews)	
Goosebumps	2015	78% (164 reviews)	
Krampus	2015	67% (130 reviews)	
The Boy	2016	29% (63 reviews)	
Annabelle: Creation	2017	71% (189 reviews)	
The Toymaker	2017		
Cult of Chucky	2017	79% (24 reviews)	
Tales from the Hood 2	2018	78% (9 reviews)	
Goosebumps 2: Haunted Halloween	2018	47% (95 reviews)	
Child's Play	2019	63% (205 reviews)	
Annabelle Comes Home	2019	65% (206 reviews)	
Benny Loves You	2019	79% (26 reviews)	
Brahms: The Boy II	2020	10% (58 reviews)	
The Curse of Humpty Dumpty	2021		
Curse of Humpty Dumpty 2	2022		
M3GAN	2022	93% (305 reviews)	
Imaginary	2024	24% (100 reviews)	
The Monkey	2025	77%	
M3GAN 2.0	2025	57%	
SOULM8TE	2026	39%	
Pinocchio Unstrung	2026	76%	

== In television ==
- Evil dolls are antagonists in episodes of The Twilight Zone, both the 1959–1964 series and the 2002 version:
  - 1962: "The Dummy" (3.33) with a ventriloquist dummy that attempts to exact revenge when he is replaced
  - 1963: "Living Doll" (5.6) features Talky Tina (voiced by June Foray), a doll belonging to the stepdaughter of Erich Streator (played by Telly Savalas)
  - 1964: "Caesar and Me" (5.28) features a ventriloquist dummy that goads his owner into committing robberies and deserts him when the police come for him
  - 2002: "The Collection" features a young girl's strange collection of dolls which were made from her past babysitters
- The theme of evil toys has also been used in Doctor Who episodes:
  - 1966: "The Celestial Toymaker"
  - 2011: "Night Terrors"
- 1986: Smurfs episode "Gargamel's Dummy," the series' antagonist Gargamel casts an evil spell on a ventriloquist's dummy Jokey Smurf had created for a talent show, hoping to use it to help him destroy the Smurf village and ultimately, the Smurfs. The dummy was a parody of Gargamel, and the real Gargamel, angered upon learning of it, casts the spell to begin exacting his revenge.
- 1992: The Simpsons episode "Treehouse of Horror III", the segment "Clown Without Pity" features a Krusty doll that tries to kill Homer. The segment borrows elements from the Twilight Zone episode "Living Doll", the Child's Play films, Gremlins, the 1975 TV film Trilogy of Terror segment "Amelia" about a killer Zuni fetish doll as well as its 1996 cinematic sequel Trilogy of Terror II segment "He Who Kills", which are both in turn adaptations of Richard Matheson's 1969 short story, "Prey". The segment also borrows elements from Cape Fear. In a different episode, "The Ziff Who Came to Dinner", a possessed killer doll named "Baby Button Eyes" appears in a horror film, The Re-Deadening (a parody of Dolly Dearest). The doll is most likely based on the real-life appearance of "Annabelle", a possessed Raggedy Ann doll.
- 1994: The Mega Man episode "Crime of the Century," Dr. Wily reprograms a bunch of dolls and other toys to perform robberies all over the city. However, it's all just a diversion so Wily can get his hands on something much more valuable: a giant black pearl.
- Rozen Maiden, anime about supernatural doll come to life with Rosa Mysticas.
- Ventriloquist dummies and dolls are also portrayed as evil in the works of R.L. Stine:
  - 1994: The Goosebumps books and TV series had the "Night of the Living Dummy" stories which featured a sentient ventriloquist dummy named Slappy.
  - 2010: R.L. Stine's The Haunting Hour featured Lilly D. in the episodes "Really You" Pt. 1 and 2 and "The Return of Lilly D".
  - 2014: R.L. Stine's The Haunting Hour features another killer toy in the episode "Near Mint Condition", which centers around Mangler, a rare cybernetic teddy bear from an '80s cartoon that was withdrawn from the market for allegedly killing and maiming its owners.
- 2000: In the Sabrina: The Animated Series episode "Generation Hex", a rare collectible Billy-Go-Boom-Boom doll that the titular character purchases with extra fundraising money comes alive and takes her forty years into the future to warn her of the consequences of her selfishness.
- 2003: In the What's New, Scooby Doo? episode "Toy Scary Boo," the gang investigates a store with living toys that are taking it over.
- 2006: In The Adventures of Jimmy Neutron: Boy Genius episode "Flippy", Jimmy puts a chip in a dummy to help his father's ventriloquism act, only for it to go awry and steal from Hugh's brain to make the dummy sentient while leaving him a mindless zombie. Later, Flippy almost kills Hugh by throwing him off a cliff in order to keep his energy and stay alive.
- 2013: In the Grojband episode "No Strings Attached," Trina Riffin suffers from pupaphobia after she had wicked visions of puppets when she was a child.
- 2015: In the first episode of Ash vs Evil Dead, "El Jefe", the demonic forces attack Ash Williams at the supermarket where he works by possessing a "Little Lori" doll.
- Chucky, an American horror television series about a serial killer-possessed doll committing murders, which is based on the Child's Play franchise

=== List of episodes ===
The episodes that feature killer toys are listed as follows:

Series	Episode	Year	Reference
The Twilight Zone	"The Dummy"	1962	
The Twilight Zone	"Living Doll"	1963	
The Twilight Zone	"Caesar and Me"	1964	
Doctor Who	"The Celestial Toymaker"	1966	
Night Gallery	"The Doll"	1971	
Spectreman	"Hit and Run"	1971	
Ultraman Taro	"The White Rabbit is a Bad Guy!"	1973	
The Ghost Busters	"The Dummy's Revenge"	1975	
Ultraman 80	"Duel! 80 vs Seven"	1980	
The Smurfs	"Gargamel's Dummy"	1986	
Friday the 13th: The Series	"The Inheritance"	1987	
Tales from the Crypt	"Strung Along"	1992	
The Simpsons	"Treehouse of Horror III"	1992	
Sailor Moon	S01E18: "Shingo’s Innocent Love! A Sorrowful French Doll"	1992	
Mega Man	"Crime of the Century"	1996	
Goosebumps	"Night of the Living Dummy II"	1996	
Goosebumps	"Night of the Living Dummy III: Part 1"	1997	
Goosebumps	"Night of the Living Dummy III: Part 2"	1997	
Goosebumps	"Bride of the Living Dummy"	1998	
The X-Files	"Chinga"	1998	
Sabrina: The Animated Series	"Generation Hex"	2000	
Beyond Belief: Fact or Fiction	"Battered Doll/Poker Justice"	2002	
What's New, Scooby-Doo?	"Toy Scary Boo"	2003	
The Twilight Zone	"The Collection"	2003	
The Simpsons	"The Ziff Who Came to Dinner"	2004	
Totally Spies!	"Toying Around"	2004	
The Adventures of Jimmy Neutron: Boy Genius	"Flippy"	2006	
Nightmares & Dreamscapes: From the Stories of Stephen King	"Battleground"	2006	
R. L. Stine's The Haunting Hour: The Series	"Really You: Part 1"	2010	
R. L. Stine's The Haunting Hour: The Series	"Really You: Part 2"	2010	
Doctor Who	"Night Terrors"	2011	
R. L. Stine's The Haunting Hour: The Series	"The Return of Lilly D"	2012	
R. L. Stine's The Haunting Hour: The Series	"Near Mint Condition"	2014	
Ash vs Evil Dead	"El Jefe"	2015	

== List of comics ==
The comics that feature killer toys are listed as follows:

- "The Kid Gang" (May 17 - Sep 14, 1954), a series of Mickey Mouse comic strips with Bill Walsh as writer and Floyd Gottfredson as artist, the antagonist Big Ben (a gangster leader who misleads the children) abandons Mickey to the mercy of automatic killer toys and dummies.

== See also ==
- Haunted doll
- Uncanny valley
