= Perigi's Wonderful Dolls =

1955 science fiction short story

Perigi's Wonderful Dolls is a 1955 science fiction short story written and adapted by George Lefferts for the radio drama series X Minus One. It was originally aired without commercials by NBC on June 5, 1955, and later rebroadcast on January 18, 1956. Comparisons have been raised between several aspects of this story and the Twilight Zone episode "Living Doll". However, having aired eight years before "Living Doll", "Perigi's Wonderful Dolls" is one of the first radio broadcasts to pioneer the killer toy horror genre.

== Synopsis ==
Waiting for her husband, Colonel Henry Grayson, to finish work and meet with them, Alma Grayson and her daughter Cindy come across a curious new toyshop with window displays full of beautifully crafted dolls. Having been delayed by a pilot's report of a mysterious flying sphere entering American airspace, Colonel Grayson approaches his wife and daughter and informs them that he must attend a staff meeting at the Pentagon as a result of the strange occurrence. Upon wishing him farewell, Cindy and Alma enter the shop and are welcomed by an assortment of handmade toys created by Santor Perigi, store owner and clerk. Perigi shows Cindy one of his greatest creations, Toto: a talking, walking, dancing doll who promptly becomes Cindy's favorite. Perigi explains he will not sell Toto, only rent him, so that once Cindy has grown tired of the doll, he may be enjoyed by someone else. Alma is persuaded and "rents" Toto for ten dollars.

Later that evening, Cindy proudly introduces Toto to her puppy, Blister, but is shocked and upset when the dog immediately barks and bites at the doll. Toto screams and Cindy declares she never wants to see Blister again.

As they sit down to breakfast the next morning, Henry informs Alma that he has smuggled confidential documents out of the Pentagon into their home. Though Alma worries about the gravity of what is contained in those papers, Henry assures her he has things under control and calls for Blister. When Blister does not respond, Henry and Alma find him dead next to his food bowl, which is full of broken glass. Henry, alarmed, accuses Cindy of killing the dog, despite her protestations of innocence. Shortly after, Henry's strongbox disappears with top secret documents inside, along with its key. Cindy is again blamed once her parents discover the lockbox key hanging around Toto's neck. Cindy insists she hasn't done anything wrong, that Toto is responsible and has been whispering death threats into her ear at night. Her father takes the doll and declares he will return it to Perigi immediately.

After having his creation returned to him, Perigi invites Henry to the back of the toy shop where he reveals a strong box containing the missing documents. He tries to blackmail Henry into providing more information about the flying sphere reported by the pilot, but after a brief argument in which Cindy's and Alma's lives are threatened, Henry shoots Perigi. Henry calls the police and waits for them to arrive. Toto begins to laugh maniacally, revealing that Santor Perigi was himself a doll, and Toto the master. In reality, Toto is an alien named "Zanthis Senpirator, commander of the third legion of the planetoid Meritryx." He and his people, who appear as dolls to humans, have arrived on Earth in the mysterious spherical craft because Meritryx is so small it can no longer support their population. Intending to colonize the planet, the doll-aliens constructed Perigi to avoid arousing suspicion. Toto warns Henry that if he tries to interfere, the aliens will unleash weapons of mass destruction upon the world.

The police arrive to a seemingly insane Henry raving about a man-sized doll. To the amazement of all present, Perigi emerges from the back of the shop unharmed, and asserts he has no idea who Henry is. An outraged Henry insists that tiny men dressed as dolls have arrived in a flying sphere to take over the planet, much to the officers' disbelief. In the end, Henry is hauled away to a mental institution as one of the policemen marvels at a ceaselessly giggling Toto. He remarks that the doll will make a great gift for his daughter.

== Cast ==
- Joe De Santis as Santor Perigi
- Nelson Olmstead as Colonel Henry Grayson
- Janet Alexander as Cindy Grayson
- Anne Pitoniak as Alma Grayson
- Michael O' Day as Toto
- Ken Lynch as Sergeant

== Connections with "The Twilight Zone" ==
Some comparisons have been made between the plots and characters of "Perigi's Wonderful Dolls" and "Living Doll". The latter was ghost-written by Jerry Sohl (credited to Charles Beaumont,) who also debuted his short story "The Seventh Order" on X Minus One and worked closely with George Lefferts.

Both episodes feature:

- An evil doll whose name begins with "T" ("Toto" and "Tina" respectively)
- A little girl whose name begins with "C" ("Cindy" and "Christie" respectively)
- A mother whose name begins with "A" ("Alma" and "Annabelle" respectively)
- Themes of familial conflict, specifically between father and daughter.
- A climax ending in the father's disposal.
