= Mary LaRoche =

American actress and singer (1920–1999)

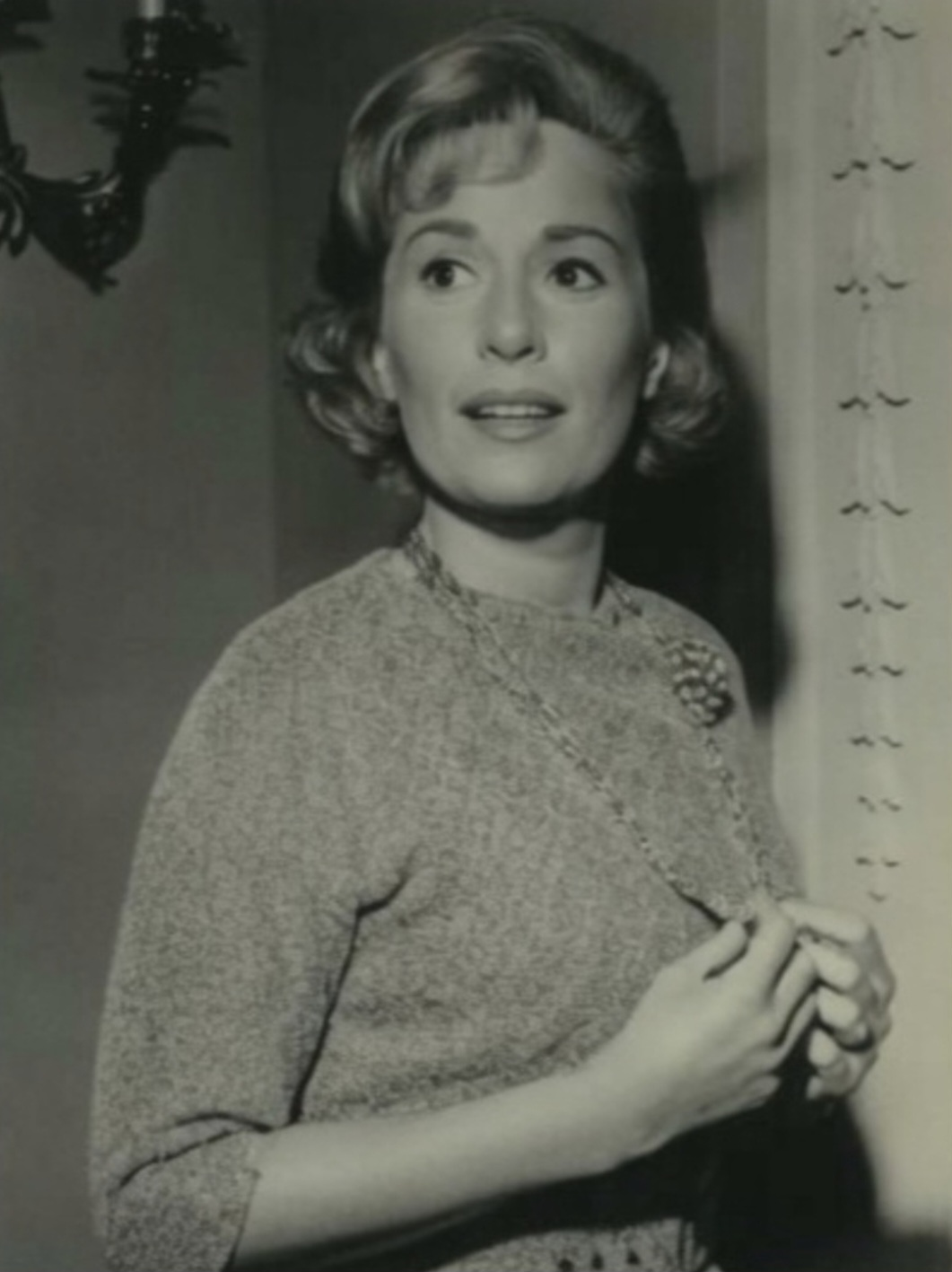
- LaRoche in Karen, 1965
- Born: Mary Catherine La Roche; July 20, 1920; Rochester, New York, U.S.
- Died: February 9, 1999 (aged 78); Rochester, New York, U.S.
- Education: Eastman School of Music
- Occupation: Actress
- Years active: 1939–1977
- Spouses: John Hudson (m. 1941; div. 1947) Sherwood Price (m. 1967)

Mary LaRoche (also often credited Mary La Roche; July 20, 1920 – February 9, 1999) was an American actress and singer best known for her roles in the feature films Gidget (1959) and Bye Bye Birdie (1963) and for her performances as a guest star and supporting character on American television series between the early 1950s and mid-1970s, including on such popular series as The Twilight Zone, The Alfred Hitchcock Hour, Perry Mason, and Gunsmoke.

== Early years ==
Born in Rochester, New York in 1920, Mary was the youngest of three daughters of Catherine R. (née Carney) and William P. La Roche. Her mother was also from New York and was of Irish descent. Her father, a native of Canada, supported the family working as the manager of a local hotel and later as the proprietor of a restaurant in Rochester. Mary received training in piano and voice at the Eastman School of Music in Rochester and by age 10 she was already acting on radio programs. She gained additional acting experience in Rochester with the Community Players and the Paddy Hill Players. In 1939, La Roche (later LaRoche) was a sectional winner in the radio talent-show competition Gateway to Hollywood.

== Career ==
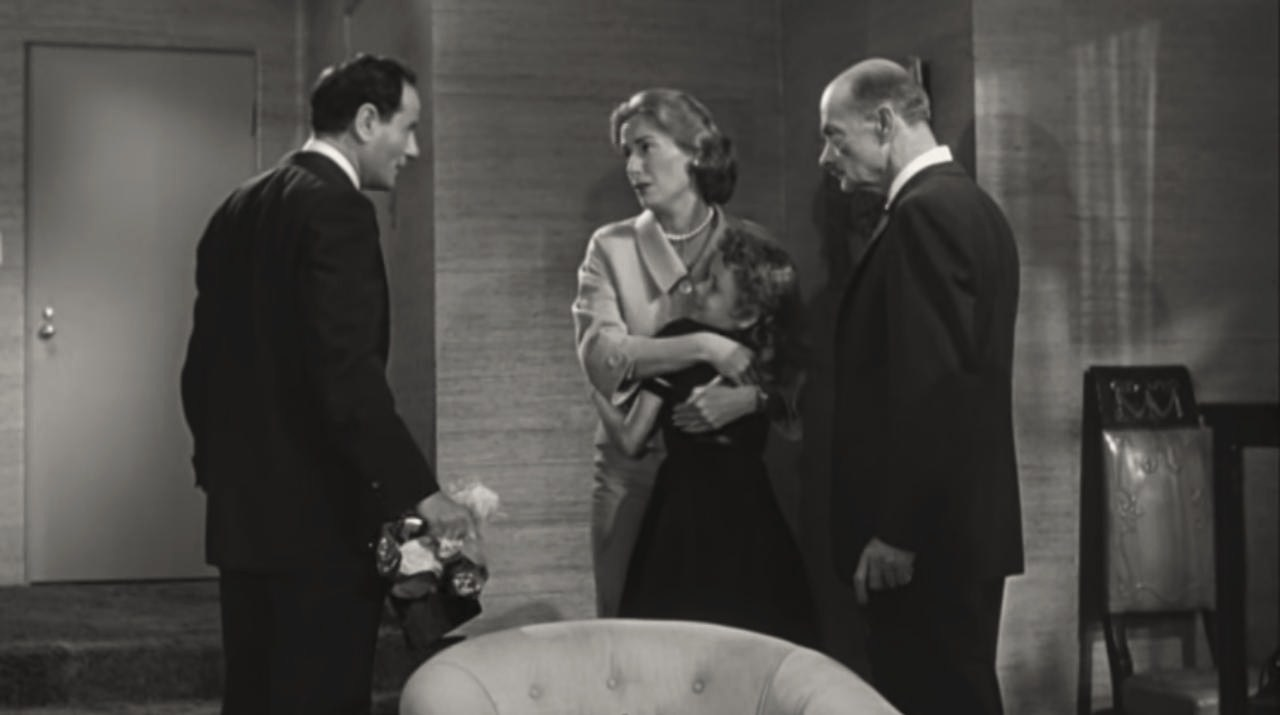
Eli Wallach, LaRoche, Cheryl Callaway, and Robert Keith in The Lineup (1958)

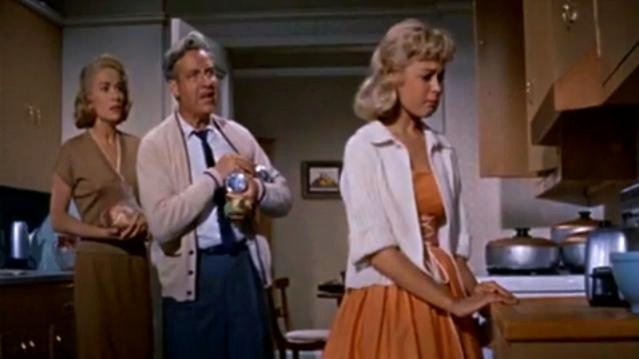
LaRoche, Arthur O'Connell and Sandra Dee in Gidget (1959)

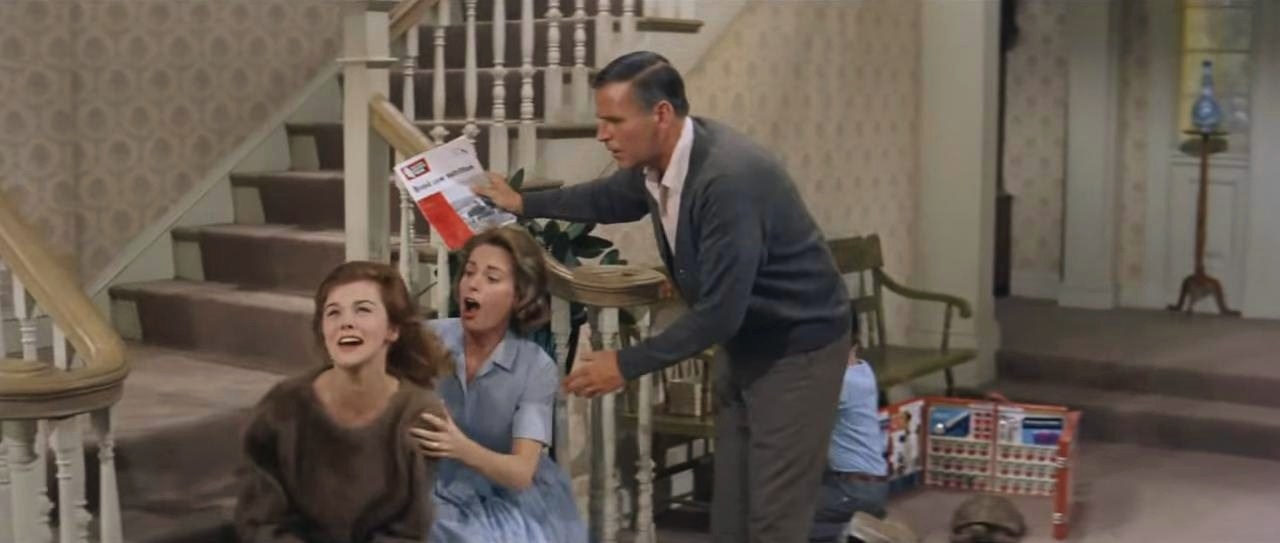
Ann-Margret, LaRoche and Paul Lynde in Bye Bye Birdie (1963)

LaRoche began singing and acting on and off Broadway in 1938. Over the next seven years she appeared in a number of Broadway musical comedies, including the 1942 operetta The Merry Widow by Franz Lehár. She later was cast in various feature films during the 1950s and 1960s, including in the role of a singer in Catskills Honeymoon in 1950; Operation Mad Ball in 1957; Clark Gable's love interest in 1958's Run Silent, Run Deep; The Lineup, also released in 1958; Gidget in 1959, in which she portrays the mother of Sandra Dee's title character; The Ladies Man in 1961; Bye Bye Birdie in 1963, playing the part of Ann Margaret's mother; and The Swinger in 1966.

LaRoche was very active in television, usually in guest appearances in single episodes of television series. She began performing on television as early as 1946, when she was part of a two-person skit that was broadcast on WBKB-TV in Chicago. Between 1951 and 1977, she appeared in at least 37 different television series, including five appearances on Perry Mason, two episodes of The Twilight Zone and an episode of The Streets of San Francisco in 1976. One of LaRoche's more complex and dramatic characterizations on television is in the one-hour 1963 episode of Gunsmoke titled "Quint-Cident". In that episode of the classic Western, in a central role opposite Burt Reynolds, she portrays a beleaguered and mentally exhausted widow trying to survive alone on an isolated farmstead in Kansas during the late 1870s.

== Personal life ==
LaRoche was married to actor John Hudson and to actor-producer Sherwood Price.

== Theater ==
=== On Broadway ===
- The Girl from Wyoming (1938–1939), musical comedy, as one of the Cow-Belles.
- The Merry Widow (1942), operetta, music by Franz Lehár, original book by Victor Léon and Leo Stein, adaptation by Adrian Ross: as a singer
- The New Moon (1942), musical comedy, music by Sigmund Romberg, as the nightclub singer
- Laffing Room Only (1944–1945), music and lyrics by Burton Lane, as Sonya, the nightclub singer

=== International ===
- South Pacific performed in Australia (1953), as Nellie Forbush

== Select filmography ==
=== Cinema ===
- Catskill Honeymoon (1950) – the Nightclub Singer
- Operation Mad Ball (1957) – Lieutenant Schmidt (uncredited)
- Run Silent, Run Deep (1958) – Laura Richardson
- The Lineup (1958) – Dorothy Bradshaw
- Gidget (1959) – Mrs. Dorothy Lawrence
- The Ladies Man (1961) – Miss Society
- Bye Bye Birdie (1963) – Doris McAfee
- The Swinger (1966) – Mrs. Olsson

=== Television ===
==== Series ====
- 1958 to 1963: Perry Mason (the original series)
  - Season 1, Episode 31: "The Case of the Fiery Fingers" (1958), as Vicky Braxton
  - Season 2, Episode 18: "The Case of the Jaded Joker" (1959), as Lisa Hiller
  - Season 3, Episode 1: "The Case of the Spurious Sister" (1959), as Grace Norwood
  - Season 5, Episode 6: "The Case of the Meddling Medium" (1961), as Helen Garden
  - Season 6, Episode 14: "The Case of the Bluffing Blast" (1963), as Donella Lambert
- 1959: Yancy Derringer
  - Season 1, Episode 14: “Nightmare on Bourbon Street”, as Barbara Kent
- 1959: Mickey Spillane's Mike Hammer (the original series)
  - Season 4, Episode 14: Tales of Wells Fargo "Long Odds" (1959), as Lorna Terret
  - Season 2, Episode 37: "Slab Happy", as Julie Gates
- 1960 to 1963: The Twilight Zone
  - Season 1, Episode 36: "A World of His Own" (1960), as Mary
  - Season 5, Episode 6: "Living Doll" (1963), as Annabelle Streator
- 1962: Checkmate
  - Season 2, Episode 17: "Death Beyond Recall", as Martha Baker
- 1962: Wagon Train
  - Season 5, Episode 31: "The Jud Steele Story", as Ursula Steele
- 1962 to 1963: Dr. Kildare
  - Season 1, Episode 15: "My Brother, the Doctor" (1962), as Judy
  - Season 3, Episode 12: "Charlie Wade Makes Lots of Shade" (1963), as Sarah Oliver
- 1963: The Alfred Hitchcock Hour
  - Season 2, Episode 1: "A Home Away from Home", as Ruth
- 1963: Gunsmoke in "Police of the plain" (Gunsmoke or Marshal Dillon)
  - Season 8, Episode 33: "Quint-Cident", as Willa Devlin
  - Season 9, Episode 4: "Tobe", as Hanna
- 1964: The Virginian
  - Season 2, Episode 20: "First to Thine Own Self", as Alma Reese
- 1964: The F.B.I.
  - Season 2, Episode 5: "The Scourge", as Lyn Towner
- 1967 to 1970: The Wonderful World of Disney
  - Season 14, The Wonderful World of Disney (anthology series), Episodes 11 and 12: "A Boy Called Nuthin", Parts I & II (1967), as Carrie Brackney
  - Season 17, Episodes 4 and 5: "The Wacky Zoo of Morgan City", Parts I & II (1970) by Marvin J. Chomsky, as Nancy Collins
- 1976: The Streets of San Francisco
  - Season 5, Episode 4: "The Drop", as Alice Horvath

==== Television films ====
- 1974: The Family Kovack by Ralph Senensky: as Mrs. Linsen
- 1976: Brinks: The Great Robbery by Marvin J. Chomsky: as Betty Houston
