= Joe Castro (filmmaker) =

American special effects artist and film director

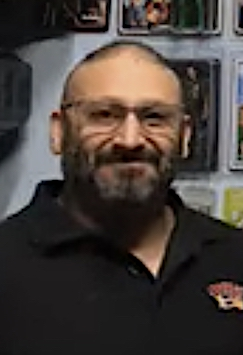
- Castro in 2023
- Born: Joseph M. Castro; May 17, 1970 (age 56); Helotes, Texas, U.S.
- Other names: Joe M. Castro, Joey Castro
- Education: John Marshall High School
- Known for: Special effects creature makeup
- Notable work: The Jackhammer Massacre; Maniacal; The Summer of Massacre; Terror Toons
- Spouse: Steven Escobar
- Website: joecastrofx.com

Joseph M. Castro (born May 17, 1970) is an American special effects artist and filmmaker best known for directing the films Terror Toons (2002), Maniacal (2003), The Jackhammer Massacre (2004), and The Summer of Massacre (2011), which holds the Guinness World Record for the highest body count in a slasher film.

== Personal life ==
Castro was born May 17, 1970 to Christine Castro. He grew up in Helotes, Texas and graduated from John Marshall High School in 1988. Castro later moved to Los Angeles, California and married film producer and collaborator Steven Escobar.

== Career ==
Castro started making masks and other molds using latex when he was 12. His influences in special effects started after he got his first copy of Fangoria magazine and watching the films Godzilla vs. the Smog Monster and An American Werewolf in London. He started making films on his family's property and at Hill Country.

When he was 15, Castro won Forrest J Ackerman's national mask making contest with Monsterland Magazine. It allowed him a five day trip to Hollywood to learn techniques for gore makeup alongside filmmakers Joe Dante and John Carl Buechler. When he was 17, he was featured in the television show PM Magazine for a werewolf transformation effect and did the special effects for a seasonal March of Dimes charity driven haunted house. In 1988, he designed an 11 room haunted motel to raise money for the Muscular Dystrophy Association.

In 2010, Castro was in pre-production for a film he was to direct The Summer of Massacre. It went on to hold the Guinness World Record for the highest body count in a slasher film.

== Filmography ==
Year	Title	Special effects	Director	Role	Notes
1986	Phobia	Yes	Yes		
1986	The She Demon – Cali	Yes	Yes		
1986	The Undead	Yes	Yes	Yes	
1986	The Year of Terror	Yes	Yes		Feature length debut
1987	The Trouble with Meteorites	Yes	Co-director		
1991	Teenage Exorcist	Yes	No	—N/a	
1992	Evil Toons	Yes	No	No	
1996	Uncle Sam	Yes	No	—N/a	Sota Effects
1997	Night of the Demons 3	Technician	No	—N/a	
2000	Attack of the Bat Monsters	Coordinator	No	—N/a	Creature effects
2001	Zombie Chronicles	Yes	No	—N/a	
2002	Terror Toons	Coordinator	Yes	—N/a	Gore effects
2002	Blood Feast 2: All U Can Eat	Yes	No	—N/a	With Jonathan Thornton
2002	Hell's Highway	Coordinator	No	Guard	
2003	Maniacal	Coordinator	Yes	—N/a	
2004	The Jackhammer Massacre	Coordinator	Yes	—N/a	
2007	Terror Toons 2: The Sick and Silly Show	Coordinator	Yes	—N/a	Gore effects
2007	One Day Like Rain	—N/a	No	—N/a	Aliens creator/designer
2010	L.A. Zombie	Yes	No	—N/a	
2011	The Summer of Massacre	Coordinator	Yes	Michael Rose	
2017	Bonehill Road	Yes	No	—N/a	
2018	Lake Michigan Monster	Yes	No	—N/a	Creature suit design
2019	Iron Sky: The Coming Race	Yes	No	—N/a	
2019	Xenophobia	Yes	Co-director	—N/a	
2020	The Amityville Harvest	Supervisor	No	—N/a	
2021	Night Caller	Yes	No	Fake Scalper	
2022	The Once and Future Smash	Yes	No	Blaze Pauling	Smash-Mouth designer and fabricator
2023	Mutilator 2	Yes	No	—N/a	
2024	Pater Noster and the Mission of Light	Yes	No	—N/a	
2024	Sincerely Saul	Monster maker	No	Joe	Also lead vfx artist
2025	Die'ced: Reloaded	Yes	No	No	Also visual effects artist
2025	Saint Drogo	—N/a	No	Himself	
