= A World of His Own =

- The Twilight Zone episode
- Episode no.: Season 1 Episode 36
- Directed by: Ralph Nelson
- Written by: Richard Matheson
- Production code: 173-3634
- Original air date: July 1, 1960

Guest appearances
- Keenan Wynn as Gregory West; Phyllis Kirk as Victoria West; Mary LaRoche as Mary

Episode chronology
← Previous "The Mighty Casey"	Next → "King Nine Will Not Return"
- The Twilight Zone (1959 TV series, season 1)

"A World of His Own" is episode thirty-six of the American television anthology series The Twilight Zone. It was the last episode of the show's first season and essentially comedic in tone. It originally aired on July 1, 1960, on CBS.

== Opening narration ==
The home of Mr. Gregory West, one of America's most noted playwrights. The office of Mr. Gregory West. Mr. Gregory West—shy, quiet, and at the moment, very happy. Mary—warm, affectionate...And the final ingredient: Mrs. Gregory West.

== Plot ==
Coming home, Victoria West spots her husband, playwright Gregory West, through the window sharing a drink, and flirting in his study with Mary, an attractive young woman. Gregory quickly destroys a tape, which displeases Mary. When Victoria barges into the room, Mary is nowhere to be found.

Victoria looks around the room for hints of where she might have gone but does not yet confront him. Soon, she questions him. Gregory denies everything until Victoria throws in a trick, which causes him to admit the truth. Victoria is furious, but Gregory explains to his wife that any character that he describes into his dictation machine will appear according to his description. To make the character disappear, all he has to do is cut out that portion of the tape and throw it into his fireplace. Victoria doesn't believe him and is ready to divorce him and commit him to an asylum. Gregory demonstrates his power, summoning Mary again and "uncreating" her, but not before Mary requests that Gregory not bring her back again, as she has grown weary of her segmented existence. Appalled, Victoria tries to escape, but Gregory uses his power to summon an elephant to stop her. Gregory discovered this talent when Phillip Wainwright, a character from Gregory's play Fury in the Night, into whom he had put a great deal of effort and attention, approached him as a real flesh-and-blood person with his own independent will, shook his hand and thanked him.

Believing none of this, Victoria tells Gregory that he is insane and she is going to have him committed. In response, Gregory pulls a section of tape from his safe and explains that it contains her description, revealing her to be one of his creations, but that recently she has begun to exert her own independence from him. Refusing to believe him, Victoria snatches the tape away from him and throws it into the fire, and promptly begins to feel faint. She realizes too late he was telling the truth, and disappears as the flames consume the tape. Frantic, Gregory rushes to his dictation machine and begins to re-describe Victoria. He quickly reconsiders and instead describes Mrs. Mary West as his wife. Mary appears and fixes her husband a drink, apparently lacking any memory of her previous interval of existence.

== Finale/closing narration ==
Rod Serling then appears on the set and says, "We hope you enjoyed tonight's romantic story on The Twilight Zone. At the same time, we want you to realize that it was, of course, purely fictional. In real life, such ridiculous nonsense could never—"

"Rod, you shouldn't!" interrupts Gregory, who walks over to his safe and pulls out a tape marked "Rod Serling." "I mean, you shouldn't say such things as 'nonsense' and 'ridiculous!'" he continues as he throws the envelope into the fire.

"Well, that's the way it goes," observes Serling as he fades away.

Nevertheless, as Gregory joins Mary in a drink, Serling's voice comes in at the epilogue as usual:

Leaving Mr. Gregory West—still shy, quiet, very happy... and apparently in complete control of The Twilight Zone.

== Production notes ==
Writer Richard Matheson had previously written a short story, And Now I'm Waiting, in which a male narrator visiting an author discovers that he is an invention of the author. The story had a much darker tone and finish in its original form, and ultimately, Matheson chose to rework it into a domestic comedy when he pitched it as an episode to the series. Previously unreleased, the original story was ultimately published in Twilight Zone Magazine in April 1983.

Although Serling appeared on-screen at the end of most first season Twilight Zone episodes to plug the following week's show, this is the only episode in the first season in which Rod Serling appears on-screen within the episode itself (i.e., not in a separate "coming next week" segment) and directly interacts with a character from the episode. From the second season onward, Serling began to appear on-screen at the start of each episode.

Keenan Wynn was the son of vaudeville comedian Ed Wynn, who played Bookman in "One for the Angels" and Sam Forstmann in "Ninety Years Without Slumbering". Mary La Roche also starred as Annabelle Streator in the Twilight Zone episode "Living Doll".

== See also ==
- Word Processor of the Gods
- Ruby Sparks, a film with a similar premise
