= The Summer of Massacre =

2011 film by Joe Castro

- DVD released by Vicious Circle Films
- Directed by: Joe Castro
- Written by: Schroeder; Joe Castro
- Produced by: Schroeder; Joe Castro
- Cinematography: Nick Oulette; Steven J. Escobar
- Edited by: Steven J. Escobar
- Music by: Andy Garfield
- Production companies: Escobar Indie Pictures; Green Lantern Post Productions
- Distributed by: Bounty Films; Vicious Circle Films
- Release dates: May 7, 2011 (Hollywood, California)
- Running time: 98 minutes
- Country: United States
- Language: English

The Summer of Massacre is a 2011 anthology horror film written and directed by Joe Castro. It is listed in Guinness World Records as the slasher film with the largest body count, at 155.

== Plot ==
- Rampage: While out for a jog, Chris is mugged and knocked out by three thugs. When the now disfigured Chris awakens, he (apparently suffering from brain damage incurred from being beaten) embarks on a killing spree, butchering everyone he comes across with whatever objects he can get his hands on. When he finally returns home, Chris discovers the three robbers from earlier have broken in, so he shoots two of them, tortures the third to death, and commits suicide by ripping his own mutilated face off.
- Lump: On a road trip out to the forest with her friends and siblings, Kimberly Ann Harrison tries to murder her severely handicapped and deformed hermaphroditic sister Lori by shoving her off a cliff. Lori survives the fall, so Kimberly Ann forces her boyfriend Danny and dimwitted stepbrother Mikey into finishing her off, as a "mercy kill". Apparently due to experimental medical procedures she had been recently undergoing, Lori returns to life and kills every member of the group except Kimberly Ann, whose back she breaks, paralyzing her and leaving her catatonic. Sometime later, the sisters are shown outside a hospital with their mother, who tells a doctor that the authorities never did piece together what happened out in the woods on that fateful day.
- Son of the Boogyman: While out at a restaurant, Jesse tells his fiancée that when his mother was a teenager, she was raped and impregnated with him by a seemingly supernatural man known only as "Mr. Boogens". Jesse's mother escaped, and she and her son have spent most of their lives running from Mr. Boogens, who has wiped out all their relatives. After telling his story, Jesse is called by Mr. Boogens, who is using his mother's phone. Jesse and his fiancé return home, where they discover the bodies of Jesse's mother and two police officers, right before Mr. Boogens kills Jesse's fiancé. Jesse is chased through the city by Mr. Boogens, who murders everyone he seeks help from, before finally catching Jesse and biting most of his face off. At the hospital, the mangled Jesse is finished off by Mr. Boogens, who also kills everyone else in the building.
- Burn: During their last night at a church camp, a group of campers tell the story of Devon Hopper and Michael Rose, two gay fire fighters who were seemingly killed by their bigoted co-workers during a forest fire in that very same area. A year after the two men disappeared, everyone involved in their supposed deaths started being killed off, usually in the woods. When all the employees of Fire Station 14 were eliminated, their relatives started dying. When the story is finished, the campers become disturbed when they realize they are all in some way connected to Fire Station 14, but they decide to ignore this and go to bed. When Lisa awakens, she finds all her friends and everyone else from the camp dead from fire-related injuries, and is chased through the forest by the charred Devon and Michael, eventually finding their cave lair, and her injured boyfriend, Vinnie. Lisa kills one of the vengeful fire fighters, only for the other to cut her head off, and murder Vinnie.
- Kitchen: Fifteen-year-old Edie witnesses her mother being stabbed to death by a masked man in their kitchen. Five years later, Edie is having a party with her friends Johnny, Eva, Colin, Liz and Shane in her house. Colin puts on the same mask as Edie's mother's killer and scares Edie. This causes her to have a psychotic break and stab him to death with a kitchen knife. She then hacks Liz to death with a cleaver, stabs Shane in the neck with a meat thermometer, and bludgeons Johnny with a frying pan. She then advances menacingly towards Eva, but Eva coaxes Edie out of her psychotic episode. However, a still living Johnny then appears and smashes a block of ice on Eva's head. He then reveals that he killed Edie's mother and strangles Edie with the cord for the refrigerator. However, just as Johnny is about to leave the house, a dying Eva beats him to death with two frying pans before collapsing on the floor.
- The Warehouse: At the end of the first three segments interviews with three incarcerated serial killers are shown. In the finale, it is revealed that the killers had somehow escaped prison, joined forces, and are holed up in a warehouse with dozens of dead and dying victims. When his two accomplices are shot to death by the police, the final killer detonates an atomic bomb he had somehow acquired, destroying all of Los Angeles. As the credits roll, news reports state that the repercussions of "the Los Angeles nuclear massacre" will continue to be felt for centuries to come.

== Cast ==
- Rampage:
  - Tim A. Cooley as Chris
  - Daniel Aldema as Bully #1
  - Timothy Hearl as Bully #2
  - Nick Rey Angelus as Bully #3
- Lump:
  - Nick Principe as Lori Williams
  - Brinke Stevens as Mrs. Williams
  - Lisa M. Garcia as Kimberly Ann Williams
  - Ted Alderman as Doctor Harrison
  - Rene Pena as Danny
  - John Karyus as Mikey Williams
  - Vida Ghaffari as Nicole
  - Evan Owen as Jerry
- Son of the Boogyman:
  - Tchia Casselle as Melanie
  - Scott Barrows as Mr. Boogens
  - Jerry Angelo as Jesse
  - Kimmarie Johnson as Jesse's Fiancé
  - Deanna Meske as Young Melanie
- Burn:
  - Lauren Boehm as Lisa
  - Felipe Winslett as Vinnie
  - Chris Staviski as Bradley
  - London Hilton as Conrad
  - Justin Marchert as Carmen
  - Cleve A. Hall as Father Daniel
  - Joe Castro as Michael Rose
  - J T Seaton as Devon Hopper
- Kitchen:
  - Stephanie Laury as Edie
  - Carlos Shane as Johnny / Masked Man
  - Katie West as Eva
  - Leigh Muller as Shane
  - Jane Mace as Liz
  - Thomas Cooligan as Colin
  - Allison Stacey as Edie's Mother
- The Warehouse:
  - Joe Mannetti as Richard Khan
  - Bahram Khosraviani as George Vic
  - Dan Lovell as Dax Malone

== Production ==
Director Joe Castro did not originally set out to specifically break the record for most kills, but he did want to break a record of some kind. Eventually, he decided on the number of kills. Although his method of using computer graphics drew criticism, Castro used real actors and only digitally modified what was already shot.

== Release ==
Breaking Glass Pictures and Vicious Circle Films released The Summer of Massacre on DVD on January 10, 2012.

== Reception ==
An example of the film's computer generated gore effects.

Mark L. Miller of Ain't It Cool News wrote, "Those not looking for substance with their gore should seek out SUMMER OF MASSACRE; an impressive, grue-strewn gorefest." Spencer Perry of Shock Till You Drop wrote, "The Summer of Massacre is like if you took a three minute “horror movie” that some kid made for YouTube with computer-generated gore and only the remnants of a 'story' and stretched it out for almost 100 minutes. It's boring, dumb, offensive, and most importantly not scary at all." Kurt Dahlke of DVD Talk rated it 3.5/5 stars and recommended it to people with a short attention span who only want to see gory kills. Gordon Sullivan of DVD Verdict wrote, "The Summer of Massacre strives mightily to give genre fans what they want by spending 98 minutes on killing 155 people, but in the end, it's brought down by a combination of dodgy CGI and lack of character development."
