= Maniacal (film) =

- DVD released by Screen Entertainment
- Directed by: Joe Castro
- Written by: Eric Spudic
- Produced by: David Sterling
- Cinematography: Jeff Leroy
- Edited by: Steven J. Escobar
- Music by: Paul Mitrisin
- Production companies: Wildcat Entertainment; Sterling Entertainment
- Distributed by: Screen Entertainment
- Release dates: February 10, 2003 (Los Angeles, California)
- Running time: 82 minutes
- Country: United States
- Language: English

Maniacal is a 2003 horror film directed by Joe Castro, and written by Eric Spudic.

== Plot ==
While his sister Janet is out with friends one night in 1994, the disturbed Gilbert Gill uses a hammer to wound his alcoholic father and kill his sexually abusive stepmother. He is arrested by Officer Spiegel and Gilbert placed in the Hitchberg Sanitarium, where he is tormented by hallucinations of his stepmother.

Three years later, on the day he is scheduled to visit his father and sister at home, Gilbert escapes the sanitarium, murdering several employees and patients on his way out. Hijacking a pickup truck, he breaks into his old house. He creates makeshift weapons out of some assorted objects and goes to a horror shop, where he steals a clown mask and slits the throat of the clerk.

While Mr. Gill and Spiegel search for Gilbert, Janet, Spiegel's daughter D.J. and their friend Brooke have a slumber party and horror film marathon at the Spiegel house, being joined by D.J. and Brooke's boyfriends, and their friend Lance. When D.J., Brooke and their respective boyfriends go to the bedrooms to have sex they are murdered by Gilbert, who then goes after Janet and Lance. When Mr. Gill and Spiegel arrive, Gilbert wounds his father, blows Spiegel's head off with his shotgun, and crushes Lance's skull.

As Gilbert begins strangling Janet, she starts rambling about he is going to be punished and go to hell, and that he must ask God for forgiveness. Gilbert suffers a psychotic break, drinks cleaning chemicals he finds in the Spiegel's washroom, and dies in his sister's arms.

== Cast ==
- Perrine Moore as Janet Gill
- Lee Webb as Gilbert Gill
- Carl Darchuk as Garrett Gill
- Brannon Gould as Lance
- Heather Chase as D.J. Spiegel
- Jon Prutow as Josh
- David Ortega as Dane
- Carol Rose Carver as Brooke
- Deborah Huber as Nancy Gill
- Michael Robert Nyman as Officer Spiegel
- David Scalzetto as Eddie Brandt

== Reception ==
Christopher Null of Contactmusic.com gave Maniacal a 2/5, stating: "I've not laughed this hard at a horror movie in years. And that's because -- while Joe Castro's direction is iffy, Eric Spudic's script is predictable, and the entire cast's acting is poor -- makeup effects wiz Castro has a way of exploding a person's head that you just have to see to believe."

Similarly, Joe Bob Briggs stated, in a review for United Press International, "It's by the numbers, but it never bogs down" and "What the script lacks in originality, and the execution lacks in acting, is more than made up for by some of the most gruesome special effects you'll see this side of the 60 Minutes makeup room."
