= Eric Spudic =

- Born: June 7, 1979 (age 46); Mount Olive, Illinois, U.S.
- Occupations: Actor, screenwriter, film director, stunt performer, stunt coordinator
- Notable work: Maniacal; Night of the Tommyknockers
- Relatives: Fred Olen Ray (cousin)

Eric Spudic is an American actor, screenwriter, film director, stuntman and stunt coordinator.

Spudic is a distant cousin of film director Fred Olen Ray.

== Career ==
Spudic is known for such films as Psycho Santa, Prey starring Ryan Phillippe, Troma Entertainment's Zombiegeddon, Dead Clowns, Aquanoids, Night of the Bastard, Creepies, Driller, Night of the Tommyknockers, Bikini Chain Gang and Maniacal.

Spudic was also a contributor to the non-fiction horror themed book trilogy My Favorite Horror Movie alongside other such contributors as Film Threat writer Chris Gore, drummer London May of the heavy metal band Samhain, author C. Courtney Joyner and scream queen and horror actress Felissa Rose.

== Directorial debut ==
Spudic made his feature directorial debut with the revenge film Killers by Nature starring Spudic, Jason Contini, William Clifton and Nicholas J. Hearne.

In his review for Killers by Nature Bill Gibron of DVD Talk said that Spudic, "Appears to have a sense for the basics of moviemaking – i.e. focus, framing and editing," adding, "Though there is nothing stopping Eric Spudic from making it big in movies – "B" or otherwise – this preliminary attempt at motion picture production doesn't bode well for his artistic, or financial, future."

== Media ==
Christopher Null of Contactmusic.com gave Spudic's film Maniacal a 2/5, and opened his review with, "I've not laughed this hard at a horror movie in years," adding, "Eric Spudic's script is predictable."

Conversely, Joe Bob Briggs stated in his review for Maniacal, "What the script lacks in originality, and the execution lacks in acting, is more than made up for by some of the most gruesome special effects you'll see this side of the 60 Minutes makeup room."
