= The Lineup (film) =

1958 film by Don Siegel

- Theatrical poster
- Directed by: Don Siegel
- Screenplay by: Stirling Silliphant
- Produced by: Jaime Del Valle
- Starring: Eli Wallach; Robert Keith; Warner Anderson
- Cinematography: Hal Mohr
- Edited by: Al Clark
- Color process: black and white
- Production company: Pajemer Productions
- Distributed by: Columbia Pictures
- Release date: June 1, 1958 (United States)
- Running time: 87 minutes
- Country: United States
- Language: English

The Lineup is a 1958 American film version of the police procedural series of the same title that ran on CBS radio from 1950 until 1953, and on CBS television from 1954 until 1960. The film was directed by Don Siegel. It features a number of scenes shot on location in San Francisco during the late 1950s, including shots of the Embarcadero Freeway (then still under construction), the California Academy of Sciences in Golden Gate Park, the War Memorial Opera House, the Mark Hopkins Hotel, and Sutro Baths.

== Plot ==
An international drug-smuggling racket plants heroin on unsuspecting American tourists traveling from Asia, so that the dope can pass through customs undetected. A killer, Dancer, led by his mentor Julian, and their driver McLain then collect the contraband. Lt. Ben Guthrie leads the police hunt for the criminals. The head of the heroin ring is a person known only as "The Man".

An American tourist disembarking in San Francisco from a cruise ship returning from Hong Kong has his bag stolen by a porter, who throws the bag into a cab. As the cabbie takes off at high speed he runs down a police officer, who, before he dies, is able to fire his gun at the fugitive. The cab driver crashes and dies. A police investigation discovers that the cabbie was a heroin addict, and was working for a heroin smuggling ring.

Dancer and Julian have instructions to retrieve the heroin from the unsuspecting tourists and deliver it to a drop point at Sutro's Museum (a San Francisco location until it burned down in 1966) where the bag containing the heroin is to be left inside an antique ship's binnacle. Dancer and Julian are instructed by their contact, Staples, that they must make the drop and be gone before 4:05 pm. Dancer kills two people as he collects the heroin: a seaman who demands a share, and a suspicious servant who refuses to hand over a drug container. When it turns out that two of the tourists - Dorothy Bradshaw and her young daughter, Cynthia - had unknowingly disposed of the heroin, Dancer and Julian are in a bind; if they drop off the bag with a large portion of the heroin missing, their lives may be in danger. Dancer and Julian decide that instead of leaving the bag and departing the premises by 4:05, Dancer will stay, meet The Man and explain why the shipment is short. Dancer and Julian kidnap Dorothy and Cynthia and bring them to Sutro's so they can back up the story.

When Dancer meets The Man in the museum, the mastermind is in a wheelchair and apparently disabled. Dancer explains himself, and The Man's reaction is to tell Dancer that "nobody ever sees me," and that because Dancer has seen him, he "is dead". The Man slaps Dancer across the face with the bag of heroin, and Dancer, enraged, pushes The Man off a balcony, killing him.

Meanwhile, the San Francisco police have spotted the getaway car with Julian, McLain, and the kidnapped Dorothy and Cynthia. When Dancer exits Sutro's, a high speed car chase ensues in the area of The Embarcadero. When the car becomes trapped at a barrier on the Embarcadero Freeway, Dancer first shoots his accomplice to death, holding the girl hostage, then tries to flee. He is shot by the police and falls off the bridge.

== Cast ==
- Eli Wallach as Dancer
- Robert Keith as Julian
- Warner Anderson as Lt. Ben Guthrie
- Richard Jaeckel as Sandy McLain
- Mary LaRoche as Dorothy Bradshaw
- William Leslie as Larry Warner
- Emile Meyer as Inspector Al Quine
- Robert Bailey as Staples
- Raymond Bailey as Phillip Dressler
- Vaughn Taylor as "The Man"
- Cheryl Callaway as Cindy Bradshaw
- Marshall Reed as Inspector Fred Asher

In the film, Warner Anderson and Marshall Reed reprise their roles as Lieutenant Ben Guthrie and Inspector Fred Asher from the TV series. However, Tom Tully's character, Inspector Matt Grebb, is replaced by Inspector Al Quine, played by Emile Meyer. Tully, the series co-star, was not in the film. Anderson, the series star, was given co-star billing instead of star billing; star billing was given to Wallach, who played the movie's main villain.

== Reception ==
Variety's review called it a "moderately exciting melodrama" that spends too much time on the police procedural aspects. Time Out described it as "more brutal, sadistic and threatening" than The Killers. Dave Kehr of the Chicago Reader called it "a major B movie by one of Hollywood's most accomplished craftsmen".

The Lineup was preserved by the Academy Film Archive, in conjunction with Sony Pictures, in 1997.

== Style and Theme ==
"Siegel gets at least one scene, in The Lineup, as sensitive as Robert Frank's still shots. What is so lyrical about the ending, in San Francisco's Sutro Museum, is the Japanese-print compositions, the late afternoon lighting, the advantage taken of the long hallways, multi-level stairways in a baroque, elegant, glass-palace building ... It's a minor masterpiece of preplanning and an extensively structured pictorial tour by Siegel ..."—Film critic Manny Farber in Farber on Film (2009)

Film critic Manny Farber comments on Siegel's cinematic approach to The Lineup:

The Siegel touch is always apparent in the excessive number of viewpoint shots, the nice feeling for an eroded structure with awkward angles, and especially with the fascination with a somewhat mannered athleticism seen from above, in which a body is poised or moving against background action that is a violent contrast in space, tone and movement.

Farber notes Siegel's "sad reliance on edgy Broadway acting" in particular "Eli Wallach overworking his nervous leering eyes." Biographer Judith M. Kass observes that The Lineup "embodies all the characteristics" informing Siegel's assessment of the "normal" world. Kass writes:

The 'normal' world—the terrain Siegel usually works in—is depicted as not at all normal ...the characters are counterpoised against an environment which is as deranged as they are. The straight world is as phony, dishonest and evil as the criminal's, without the one qualification which may be an improvement on the normal: they [the criminals] are honest about their lawlessness ...

== In popular culture ==
The film contains the line "When you live outside the law, you have to eliminate dishonesty," of which Jonathan Lethem writes that "Bob Dylan heard it...cleaned it up a little, and inserted it into 'Absolutely Sweet Marie'" (as "To live outside the law you must be honest.").

== See also ==
- List of American films of 1958

== Sources ==
- Kass, Judith M. (1975). Don Siegel: The Hollywood Professionals, Volume 4 (1975 ed.). New York: Tanvity Press. p. 207. ISBN 0-498-01665-X.
- Farber, Manny. 2009. Farber on Film: The Complete Film Writings of Manny Farber. Edited by Robert Polito. Library of America. ISBN 978-1-59853-050-6
- The Lineup at IMDb
- The Lineup at the TCM Movie Database (archived)
- The Lineup film scenes on YouTube
- The Lineup at YouTube
