= Night of the Tommyknockers =

- Directed by: Michael Su
- Written by: Rolfe Kanefsky; Michael Mahal; Sonny Mahal
- Starring: Richard Grieco; Tom Sizemore; Robert LaSardo; Jessica Morris; Angela Cole; Eric Spudic; BJ Mezek; Robert Donovan
- Release date: 2022
- Country: United States
- Language: English

Night of the Tommyknockers is a 2022 American horror Western film directed by Michael Su and starring Richard Grieco, Robert LaSardo and Tom Sizemore.

== Plot ==
In the Old West, Nevada miners blasting for gold unknowingly release savage primeval creatures known as Tommyknockers, while a band of outlaws, the Dirk gang, plan a bank heist. The heist descends into a siege when all the survivors become trapped in the local saloon.

== Critical reception ==
Film Threat, "Night Of The Tommyknockers delivers even more so on the action front while providing a much stronger, more character-driven story. It is pure b-movie fun. The cast is game, the make-up is solid, and the whole production is a breeze to watch."

HorrorSociety.com, "Overall, Night of the Tommyknockers was an unexpected treat. I really enjoyed the film and it really put Sonny Mahal and Mahal Empire on my radar. I’m seriously looking forward to the next film in the pipeline from them."

UpcomingHorrorMovies.com, "It is frenzied fantastic fun."

Cinepunx, "Again, the film is not interested in realism, it’s interested in a good time. Overall, NIGHT OF THE TOMMYKNOCKERS does what any good genre film should do: it gives the audience 90(-ish) minutes of engaging entertainment."
