= Killer toy =

Horror fiction stock character

A killer toy or a killer doll is a stock character in horror fiction and urban legends. They include toys, such as dolls and ventriloquist dummies, that come to life and seek to kill or otherwise carry out violence. The killer toy subverts the associations of childhood with innocence and lack of agency while invoking the uncanny nature of a lifelike toy. Killer toy fiction often invokes ideas of companionship and the corruption of children, sometimes taking place in dysfunctional or single parent homes. They have historically been associated with occultism and spirit possession, though artificial intelligence became more common in later works.

The killer toy most commonly appears in film, where it dates back to Dead of Night (1945) and expands on earlier films such as The Great Gabbo (1929) and The Devil-Doll (1936). These early examples primarily featured ventriloquist dummies, with works featuring killer dolls developing in the 1960s through the 1980s. The genre of killer toy fiction was popularized by Child's Play (1988) and its killer doll Chucky, which has become widely recognized as a horror icon in popular culture. Killer toy fiction has remained prevalent in horror, and other popular killer doll franchises have been created since then, including Puppet Master and The Conjuring.

== History ==
=== Precursors and ventriloquist dummies ===
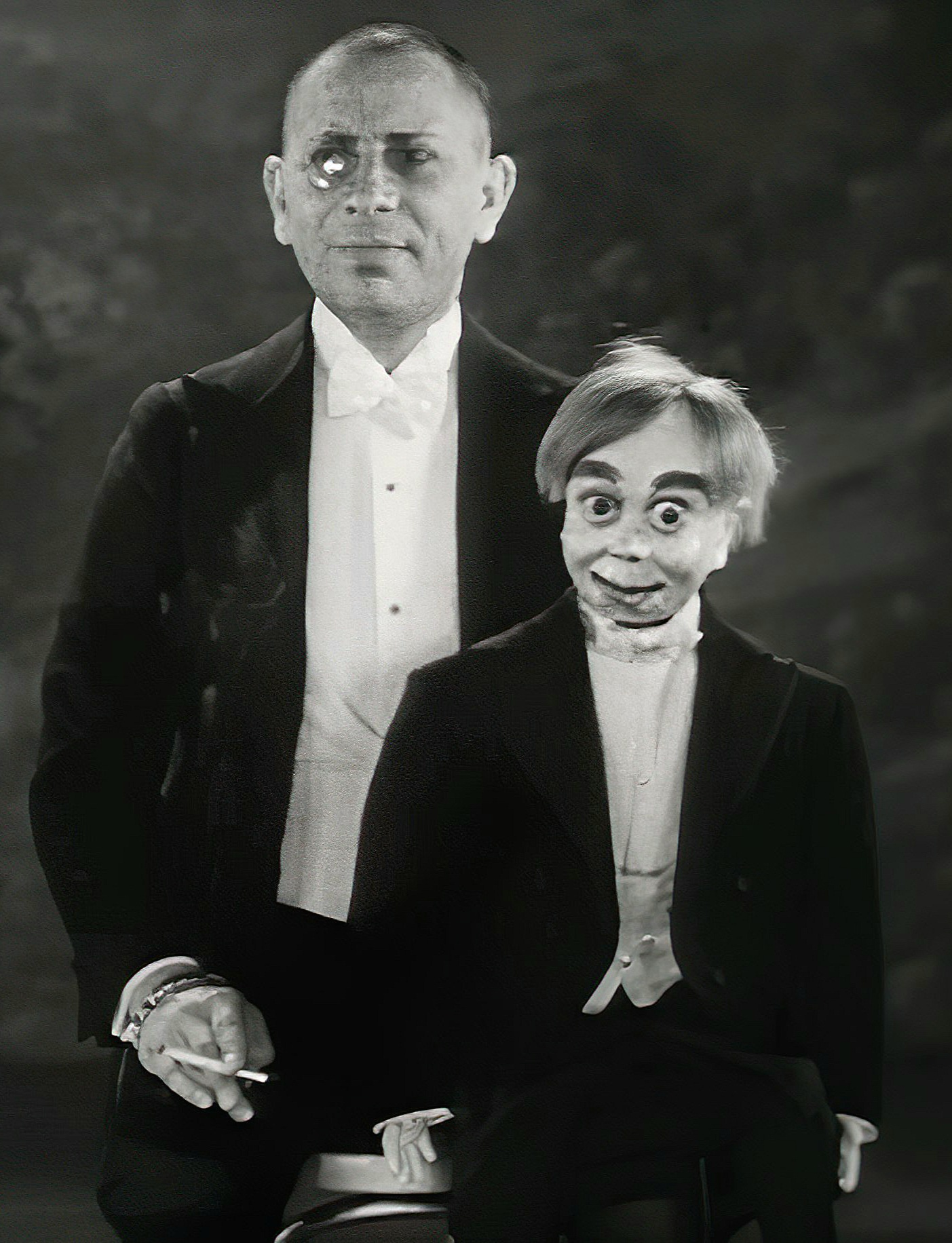
Gabbo and his ventriloquist dummy Otto in The Great Gabbo (1929)

Nineteenth-century precursors to the killer toy include "The Sandman" (1816) by E. T. A. Hoffmann and The Adventures of Pinocchio (1883) by Carlo Collodi, both of which experimented with the idea of a puppet's identity becoming more humanlike. Many American children's stories in the late 19th century emphasized dolls, sometimes marketing themselves as being written by the doll. These stories acknowledged the bond between children and dolls and the personification of dolls by children, both of which would be subverted by later killer-toy fiction.

Ventriloquist dummies served as some of the earliest examples of unnatural toys in horror films, being established with "Otto" in the musical drama The Great Gabbo (1929). The dummy was a convenient prop for early film, as it could largely be operated onscreen without any technical special effects. Dead of Night (1945) is the first identified example of a killer dummy in film, establishing its dummy Hugo by building on the ideas in The Great Gabbo. The killer dummy became a stock character in horror over the following decades, with appearances in The Dummy Talks (1943), Alfred Hitchcock Presents (1957), The Twilight Zone (1962 and 1964), and Magic (1978). The relationship between the ventriloquist and the dummy influenced later killer toy characters, even as they moved away from strictly psychological elements toward the supernatural.

=== Killer dolls in the mid-20th century ===
The Devil-Doll (1936) developed a predecessor to the killer doll, featuring shrunken humans controlled psychokinetically. The Twilight Zone introduced Talky Tina, one of the first on-screen killer dolls, in the episode "Living Doll" (1963). This use of the killer doll was contrasted with the idea of a dysfunctional family, with the narrator describing the doll as the child's "guardian". This portrayal was inspired by the advent of talking dolls like Chatty Cathy in the 1960s, which allowed for increased characterization and uncanniness of killer toys.

In the 1960s, the trend of ugly and "monstrous" toys began, with toy manufacturers such as Aurora Plastics Corporation expanding from traditional dolls and toys that complied with conceptions of morality at the time. These toys included merchandising based on popular monster movies as well as other "unattractive" toys such as toy insects. By the 1970s, this trend became associated with counterculture and teenage rebellion, incorporating imagery that would go on to be associated with horror fiction and goth subculture.

Poltergeist (1982) portrayed a killer toy with an evil clown toy that was possessed while in a supernatural realm. The film demonstrated the clown's agency by having it move while offscreen before having the child establish his own agency by killing the clown toy in self-defense. Dolls (1987) introduced the concept of explicitly creating horror through the imagery of childhood manifested by dolls.

=== Child's Play and contemporary killer toys ===
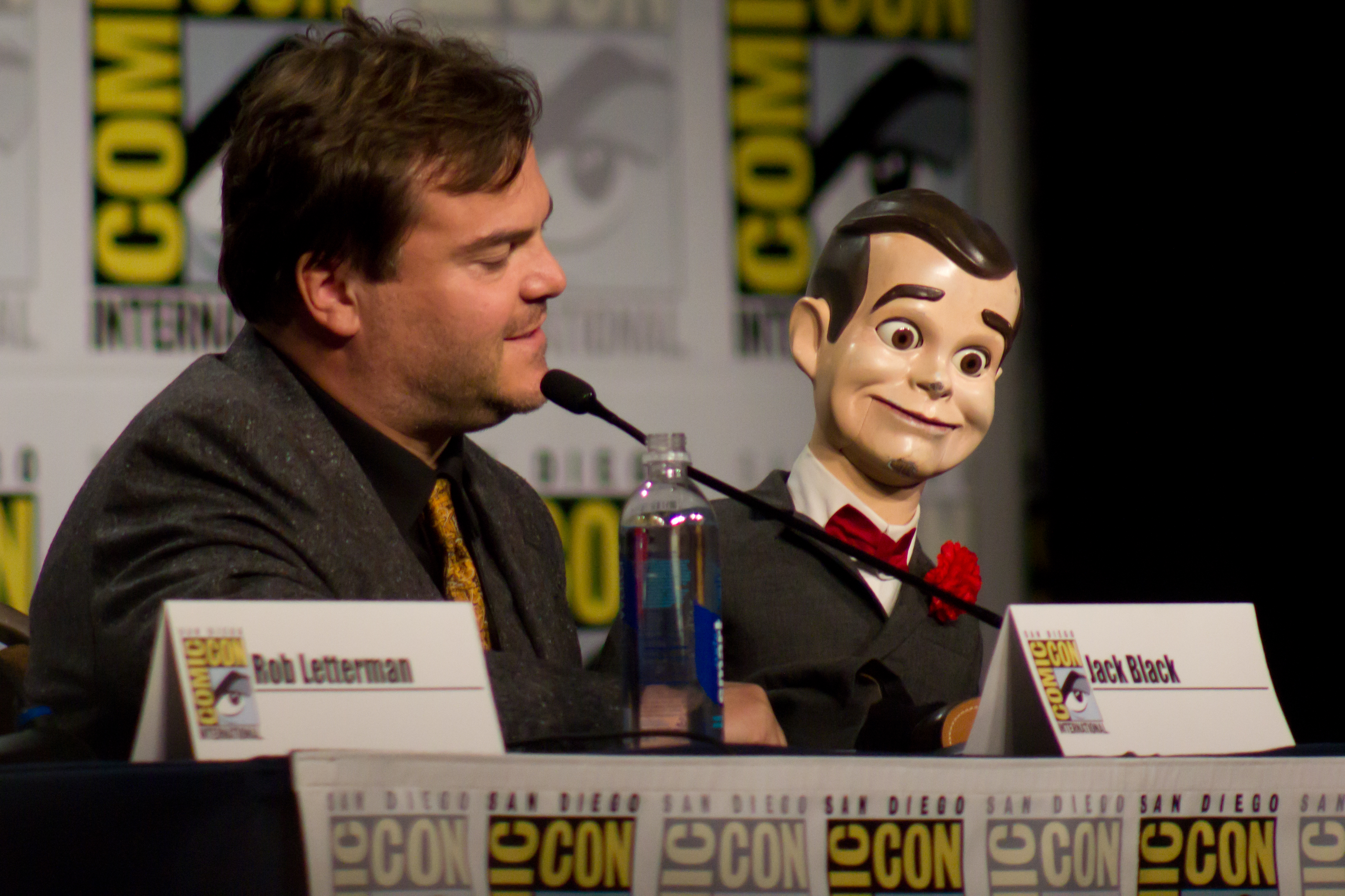
Jack Black with Slappy the Dummy, the main antagonist of Goosebumps, at San Diego Comic Con in 2014

The development of animatronics allowed for more sophisticated killer toy characters beginning in the 1980s. The film Child's Play (1988) popularized killer toy films and established its killer doll, Chucky, as a defining example of the killer doll in popular culture. This incarnation of the killer doll incorporated many of the ideas that defined such characters, including the subversion of childhood innocence, the share of agency between the toy and a child, and the emergence of the occult into the living world. The film was distinct in the source of its killer toy; rather than an undefined demonic presence, the character of Chucky is created in the physical world from a previously established character. Child's Play defined the genre, inspiring numerous successors and other similar films. Killer doll films proliferated over the following years, including further Child's Play films, the Puppet Master film series, Dolly Dearest (1991), and Pinocchio's Revenge (1996).

Saw (2004) modified the idea of the killer toy by portraying its ventriloquist dummy, Billy the Puppet, as a lifeless messenger used by the film's antagonist. By the 2010s, the killer doll became a cliché of horror stock characters. The killer doll Annabelle, allegedly based on a real haunted doll, was prominent in the 2010s. The character was created for The Conjuring (2013) before receiving a dedicated film series within the Conjuring franchise. In 2016, fiction anthologist Ellen Datlow published The Doll Collection as the first book that specifically collected killer toy fiction.

Beginning in the 2010s, killer toy fiction increasingly emphasized artificial intelligence over occultism as the cause of killer dolls. The Child's Play remake (2019) introduced Chucky as a product of technology rather than occultism. M3GAN (2022) incorporated similar themes, inverting the tradition of making a doll look more humanlike by taking a human actress and making her look less humanlike.

== Psychological effects ==
The uncanny valley represents the combination of human and inhuman qualities that produces discomfort in a viewer.

Dolls represent objects that appear corpse-like or both alive and dead, creating a sense of the uncanny. The uncanny nature of a killer toy creates a strong visual element, allowing for a prominent role in visual media such as film. Creators of killer toy films invoke the uncanny valley, in which the toy looks realistic enough to be disconcerting without looking realistic enough to look natural. The human mind naturally seeks out human faces and is more inclined to interpret personality from an object with a recognizable face. Killer toys in film can produce horror by invoking uncertainty before revealing the toy's nature with subtle changes or movements to create suspense when it is unclear whether the toy is acting autonomously.

Sigmund Freud's analysis of uncanniness in his essay "The Uncanny" (1919) has informed the phenomenon's role in horror, and it has regularly been used as a reference for the psychological effects that killer toys have on audiences. Freud posited that children do not make the same "distinction between the animate and the inanimate", while adults have an aversion to this blurring of living and non-living due to a repression of childlike ideas.

Killer toy fiction that features artificial intelligence can invoke an additional sense of horror not present in stories based on occultism. These stories reflect fears that are expressed in real-world discussions about artificial intelligence, providing a more plausible justification for the toy's behavior and creating a villain that could conceivably exist in the real world. They also invoke the uncanny in the toy's personality as well as its appearance, with artificial intelligence providing it with a nearly human demeanor.

== Themes ==
Killer toys feature prominently in contemporary Gothic fiction. They are most commonly established as a type of occultism or spirit possession in which a toy is inhabited by a demon. The killer toy can be contrasted with stories in which friendly toys come to life, such as The Adventures of Pinocchio (1883) and Toy Story (1995), as well as with science fiction stories of androids and automatons. In popular consciousness, killer toys may also be associated with other uncanny humanlike constructs, such as golems, mannequins, scarecrows, and statues.

Killer toys subvert the traditional association of childhood with innocence and dependence, to the point that the doll has become a shorthand for childhood in the horror genre. The image of the toy accentuates this theme, conflating the childish appearance of a doll with gratuitously violent and profane behavior. The threat of a killer toy includes both the threat of physical harm and the loss of innocence. The climax of killer toy fiction often involves a child killing or destroying the killer toy, granting agency to the child and completing a "cycle" of violence that exists between the toy and the child.

Killer toys invoke parental fears that children may become corrupted or that a parent may accidentally provide them with a negative influence. Stories about killer toys often involve homes with a single parent and an only child, allowing for the killer toy to fulfill an emotional role for a lonely child. In these cases, the child character may develop an attachment to the toy, reminiscent of real-life projection of children's identities onto dolls. The toy may also be dependent on the child to carry out its violence, creating a system of codependency and further blurring the individual identities of the child and the toy.

The killer toy may also be used as a criticism of adulthood and consumerism, particularly in how these concepts interact with children. Under this interpretation, the toy can be seen as carrying out revenge on adults as a proxy of the child. Feminine portrayals of killer toys rarely differ from masculine portrayals, with the focus typically being on innocence and monstrosity rather than sexuality. One practical consideration in killer toy films is the need to convince a viewer that the toy is a legitimate physical threat to its victims. Due to the small size of most toys, killer toys are often depicted as using creative or sudden attacks that do not provide an opportunity for self-defense.

Killer ventriloquist dummies invoke additional symbolic meanings by imbuing life into a toy that already appears to be living and serves as an extension of an already living person, and this connection between the puppeteer and the puppet can invoke the idea of an evil doppelgänger. The puppeteer has been recognized as a symbol for the extension of an identity since ancient times, and the merging of identities between the puppeteer and the puppet has influenced the killer toy character beyond its use with ventriloquist dummies. Dummies also reinforce the elements of childhood found in killer toy fiction due to their small stature and the childlike behavior of sitting on the ventriloquist's lap.

== See also ==
- History of horror films
- Slasher film
