= Terror Toons =

- DVD released by Brain Damage Films
- Directed by: Joe Castro
- Screenplay by: Rudy Balli
- Story by: Rudy Balli; Joe Castro; Mark Villalobos; Steven J. Escobar
- Produced by: Joe Castro
- Starring: Kerry Liu; Lizzy Borden; Beverly Lynne; Brandon Ellison; Fernando Padilla
- Cinematography: Isaac Garza
- Edited by: Steven J. Escobar
- Music by: J.M. Logan
- Production company: Jesco Film Entertainment
- Distributed by: Brain Damage Films
- Release date: August 13, 2002 (United States)
- Running time: 75 minutes
- Country: United States
- Language: English
- Budget: $2,300

Terror Toons is a 2002 American comedy horror film directed by Joe Castro and written by Rudy Balli, starring Lizzy Borden, Beverly Lynne, Brandon Ellison, Kerry Liu, and Fernando Padilla. The film was followed by three sequels, Terror Toons 2: The Sick and Silly Show in 2007, Terror Toons 3 in 2015, and Terror Toons 4 in 2022.

== Plot ==
In the "Cartoon Dimension", mad scientist Doctor Carnage experiments on a man, then disembowels him and rips his skull out through his stomach. On Earth, sisters Cindy and Candy are left alone with Cindy's friend Amy. While Cindy and Amy call over Rick and Eddie, Candy watches a Terror Toons DVD that she received in the mail. Created by Satan, the DVD depicts the antics of Doctor Carnage and his accomplice Max Assassin, a stolen lab monkey that was mutated into a monster gorilla by Carnage.

As Cindy and her friends play Strip Ouija, Candy dozes off, awakening when Carnage and Max appear in her room. The two rip Candy's spine out, behead her friend Tommy when he drops by, dismember a pizza delivery man with a giant pizza cutter, and do a hypnotic disco dance number that causes Eddie to vomit up his own innards. When Cindy, Amy, and Rick try to escape, they discover that all of the doors have been replaced by vertigo-inducing spirals. Rick is taken and has his brain experimented on by Carnage and Max, while Cindy and Amy are separated when a police officer who was released from Terror Toons is blown up by a stick of dynamite that was hidden in a box of donuts.

Cindy is captured by Carnage and, along with the lobotomized Rick, is forced to watch as Carnage and Max saw Amy in half as a part of a magic act. The two villains then take Cindy to a cartoon version of Hell and present her to the Devil, who explains that he intends to use Terror Toons to ravage the Earth and corrupt children. Realizing that "anything is possible" in cartoons, Cindy becomes a superheroine and challenges the Devil, who sends her back to her house. After discovering a machine that is producing Terror Toons DVDs, Cindy is attacked by Max, but she uses her new powers to snap his neck and stomp his brain out. When Carnage comes at her with a giant axe, Cindy uses it against him, cutting his head in half with it. As tiny monsters pour out of Carnage's split skull, Cindy destroys the Terror Toons DVD press with a crowbar.

Cindy and Candy's parents return home from a wedding and find Rick banging his head against a wall while Cindy laughs hysterically, surrounded by the remains of her friends and sister. Next door, a boy finds another copy of Terror Toons in his mailbox, and rushes inside with it. The boy's front door slams shut, and Carnage's giggle is heard.

== Cast ==
- Beverly Lynne as Cindy
- Lizzy Borden as Candy
- Brandon Ellison as Rick
- Kerry Liu as Amy
- Fernando Padilla as Eddie
- Jack Roberts as The Devil
- Gil Chase as The Father
- Shimmy Maxx as The Mother
- Fernando Gasca as Tommy
- Alexi Bustamante as The Pizza Boy
- James Sullivan as The Cartoon Cop
- Stephanie Vasquez as Cartoon Girl #1
- Diane Heppner as Cartoon Girl #2
- Scott Barrow as Max Assassin
- Matt Falletta as Doctor Carnage
- Ian Villalobos as The Neighbor's Son

== Production ==
Terror Toons was shot in three days on a budget of $2,300. This film was also the non-pornographic debut of adult film stars Lizzy Borden and Beverly Lynne.

== Reception ==
G. Noel Gross of DVD Talk gave Terror Toons a 4/5, calling it "remarkably witty" and writing, "the whole thing bobs along like a drug-induced hallucination on a river of good old fashion GORE backed by a circus calliope soundtrack. Mr. Lewis will be proud". Conversely, Ben Platt of Something Awful referred to the film as "a shitheap" and gave it a score of -48 out -50. Similarly, Jo Hadeed, youth correspondent for The Free Lance–Star, dismissed Terror Toons as "filth" comparable to Killer Klowns from Outer Space. The film was also covered by Robert Fure for Film School Rejects's "Worst Movie Ever" column, which described Terror Toons as "quite possibly the single worst movie ever made".

== See also ==
- Evil Toons, a similar film released in 1992.
