= Robert Keith (actor) =

American actor (1898–1966)

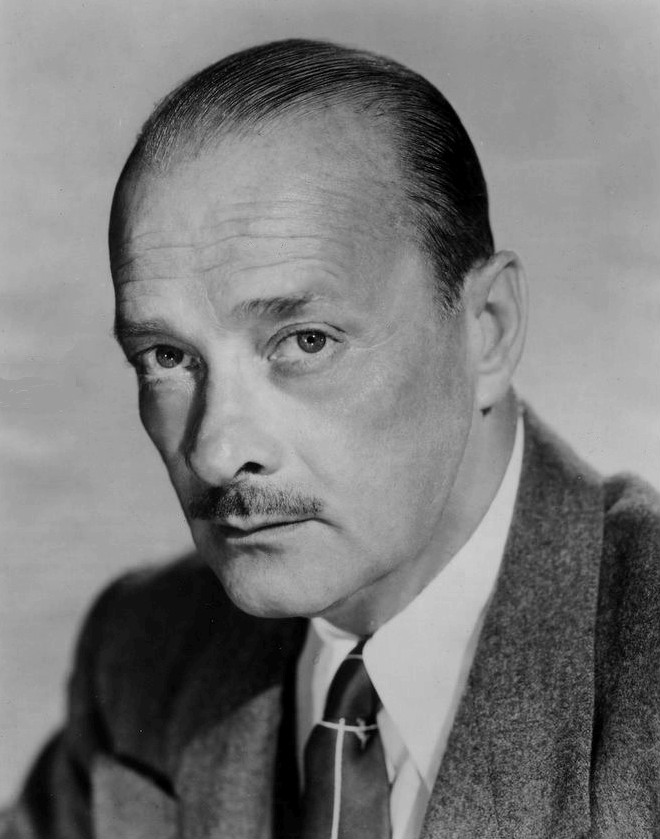
- Keith in 1953
- Born: Rolland Keith Richey; February 10, 1898; Fowler, Indiana, U.S.
- Died: December 22, 1966 (aged 68); Los Angeles, California. U.S.
- Resting place: Holy Cross Cemetery, Culver City
- Occupation: Actor
- Years active: 1924–1964
- Spouses: Laura Corinne Jackson (m. 1917; div. before 1919); Helena Shipman (m. after 1920; div. 1926); Peg Entwistle (m. 1927; div. 1929) Dorothy Tierney (m. 1930)
- Children: Brian Keith

Rolland Keith Richey (February 10, 1898 – December 22, 1966), known professionally as Robert Keith, was an American stage and film actor who appeared in several dozen films, mostly in the 1950s as a character actor.

== Early life ==
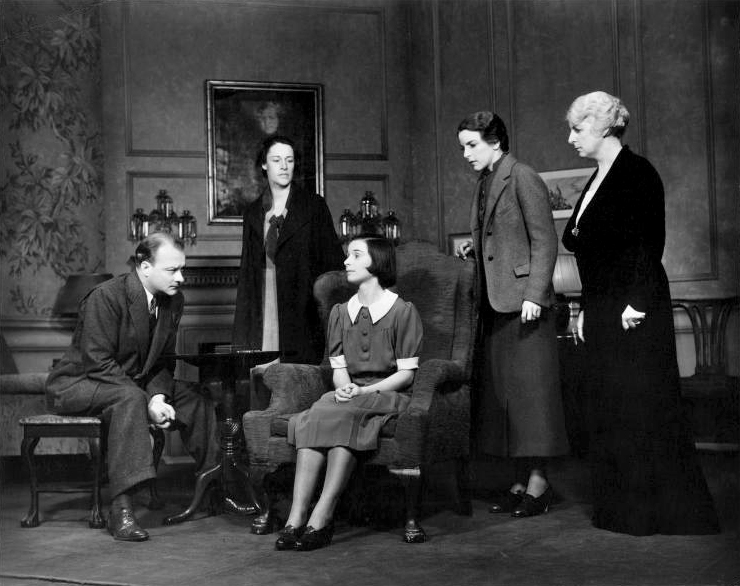
Robert Keith, Anne Revere, Florence McGee, Katherine Emery and Katherine Emmet in the original Broadway production of Lillian Hellman's The Children's Hour (1934)

Keith was born in Fowler, Indiana, the son of Mary Della (née Snyder) and James Haughey Richey.

== Career ==
He portrayed characters such as the father in Fourteen Hours (1951) and a psychopathic gangster in The Lineup (1958).

He also played the police chief and father of biker Marlon Brando's love interest in the 1953 film The Wild One, and as another cop, this time Brando's antagonist, in the film musical, Guys and Dolls.

Keith had a large supporting role in Douglas Sirk's Written on the Wind. He had roles on television, including a role as Richard Kimble's father in The Fugitive and lead roles on episodes of Alfred Hitchcock Presents ("Ten O'Clock Tiger" and "Final Escape") and The Twilight Zone ("The Masks"), which was his last screen effort, in the role of Jason Foster, the rich New Orleans patriarch to a family waiting for their benefactor to die. He appeared as scientist Garson Lee in a 1954 episode of The Motorola Television Hour "Atomic Attack".

== Personal life ==
Keith's second wife was stage actress Helena Shipman, with whom he had a son, actor Brian Keith (b. 1921).

On April 18, 1927, Keith married actress Peg Entwistle. They were divorced in 1929, with Entwistle citing abuse and domestic cruelty in her divorce filing. Entwistle also stated that Keith had deceived her into believing that he had never been married before. Keith married his fourth wife, Dorothy Tierney, in a secret wedding ceremony on an undisclosed date in 1930. They met in late 1929 while both were acting at different theatres in the San Francisco Bay Area. The couple remained together until Keith's death on December 22, 1966. Among the honorary pallbearers at his funeral were Ronald Reagan, Edward G. Robinson, and James Cagney.

== Partial filmography ==
- The Other Kind of Love (1924) as George Benton
- Abraham Lincoln (1930) as Union Courier (uncredited)
- Just Imagine (1930) as Chorus Man (uncredited)
- White Shoulders (1931) Bit Part (uncredited)
- Bad Company (1931) as Crump aka Professor aka Prof (uncredited)
- The Shadow Laughs (1933) as George Hackett
- Boomerang! (1947) as 'Mac' McCreery
- My Foolish Heart (1949) as Henry Winters
- The Reformer and the Redhead (1950) as Tim Harveigh
- Edge of Doom (1950) as Detective Lieutenant Mandel
- Woman on the Run (1950) as Inspector Ferris
- Branded (1950) as T. Jefferson Leffingwell
- Fourteen Hours (1951) as Paul E. Cosick
- Here Comes the Groom (1951) as George Degnan
- I Want You (1951) as Thomas Greer
- Just Across the Street (1952) as Walter Medford
- Somebody Loves Me (1952) as Sam Doyle
- Battle Circus (1953) as Lieutenant Colonel Hilary Walters
- Small Town Girl (1953) as Judge Gordon Kimbell
- Devil's Canyon (1953) as Warden Steve Morgan
- The Wild One (1953) as Police Chief Harry Bleeker
- Drum Beat (1954) as Bill Satterwhite
- Young at Heart (1954) as Gregory Tuttle
- Underwater! (1955) as Father Cannon
- Love Me or Leave Me (1955) as Bernard V. Loomis
- Guys and Dolls (1955) as Lieutenant Brannigan
- Ransom! (1956) as Police Chief Jim Backett
- Between Heaven and Hell (1956) as Colonel Cousins
- Written on the Wind (1956) as Jasper Hadley
- Men in War (1957) as The Colonel
- My Man Godfrey (1957) as Alexander Bullock
- The Lineup (1958) as Julian
- Tempest (1958) as Captain Miranov
- They Came to Cordura (1959) as Colonel Rogers
- Cimarron (1960) as Sam Pegler
- Posse from Hell (1961) as Captain Jeremiah Brown
- Duel of Champions (1961) as Tullio Hostilio, King of Rome
- Alfred Hitchcock Presents (1962) (Season 7 Episode 26: "Ten O'Clock Tiger") as Arthur 'The Professor' Duffy
- The Alfred Hitchcock Hour (1964) (Season 2 Episode 18: "Final Escape") as Doc
- The Twilight Zone (1964) (Season 5 Episode 25: "The Masks") as Jason Foster
