= Terror Toons 2: The Sick and Silly Show =

- Directed by: Joe Castro
- Written by: Joe Castro
- Produced by: Steven J. Escobar
- Starring: Shane Ballard; Emma Bing; Bart Burson; David Alan Graf; Brinke Stevens
- Cinematography: Nick Saglimbeni
- Edited by: Steven J. Escobar
- Music by: Jason Frederick
- Distributed by: Jesco Film Entertainment
- Release date: March 27, 2007
- Running time: 76 minutes
- Country: United States
- Language: English

Terror Toons 2 (also known as Terror Toons 2: The Sick and Silly Show) is a 2007 comedy horror directed by Joe Castro. It is the sequel to Terror Toons. It was supposed to come out in 2004 but was pushed to 2007. On March 27, 2007, the DVD was released and can only be purchased on the internet.

Two sequels, Terror Toons 3 and Terror Toons 4, were released in 2015 and 2022, respectively.

== Plot ==
A girl receives a weird DVD in the mail on her birthday. In the meanwhile, Hansel and Gretel, follow out their fairy tale, and arrive at a witch's house, after getting lost in the cartoon-like woods. The witch planned to poison them with a rat and a bottle containing Nitroglycerin, but instead of killing them, it turns them into big-headed, crazy cartoon characters: Hansel becomes a giant, demonic, anthropomorphic rat, and Gretel becomes a criminally insane girl with ugly teeth and a big head. They rip the witch in half and, almost immediately, they are pulled from their world to reality and begin watching it. Most of the partygoers are slain in various ways until the last of the group goes through a swirl-like portal and end up in the Cartoon Dimension where they encounter cartoon signs, cartoon demons, the clown from the party, and, unfortunately, Hansel and Gretel get some of the group members and the clown killed. The final girl and the boyfriend come up with a plan to keep Hansel and Gretel distracted: they kill Hansel with a giant cartoon mousetrap, and they stop Gretel with a tranquilizer gun and enter the entrance to Hell where they encounter surreal demons, monsters, and zombies.

The final girl and the boyfriend find out that Damian, Satan's son, (Shane Ballard) sent the duo after them. In the encounter, he shows them a new character, a giant worm-like monster. He then attempts to rape a girl and in the resulting fight, she gets infected with "the demon"(which is actually a rattlesnake). After they escape, Damian turns into a giant horned demon. Hansel and Gretel prepare to send Mom into Hell with a rocket, but before they can, the boyfriend comes in, slices off Hansel's hand, in which Hansel and Gretel form together into the worm Damian showed them, as a final attempt at killing everyone.

Just when it was about to succeed, a girl comes in, and supports the beast against the wall, telling her boyfriend to destroy the DVD, which has since been a factory for the DVDs. The Boyfriend lights the rocket, and rides it into the machine, blowing up half the house, where he, the girl, and the beast are presumably killed in the explosion. The police arrive to help out the survivors.

The film ends with Damian dropping a box of Terror Toons off at a movie rental store, where he laughs maniacally and the screen cuts, reminiscent of the beginning.

== Cast ==
- Shane Ballard as Damian
- Emma Bing as Tina Sanders
- Bart Burson as Kevin
- David Alan Graf as the party clown
- Brinke Stevens as the Evil Witch
- Fernando Padilla as Hansel
- Tina Mahler as Gretel

== Release ==
The film was released straight to DVD on March 27, 2007.
