= Die'ced: Reloaded =

- Directed by: Jeremy Rudd
- Written by: Jeremy Rudd
- Produced by: Jeffrey Decker; Chad Ferrin; Tylor Jones
- Starring: Eden Campbell; Jason Brooks; Nigel Vonas
- Distributed by: Epic Pictures Releasing
- Release date: August 8, 2025 (United States)
- Running time: 81 minutes
- Country: United States
- Language: English

Die'ced: Reloaded is a 2025 American slasher film written and directed by Jeremy Rudd. It is an expanded, feature-length version of 2022 micro-budget horror Die'ced. Distributed by Epic Pictures Group, the film stars Eden Campbell, Jason Brooks, and Nigel Vonas. The 2025 version incorporates new scenes, remastered sound and visuals, and an extended runtime.

The film received a limited theatrical release on August 8, 2025, by Epic Pictures Releasing followed by a video-on-demand release on August 12, 2025. A Blu-ray release was on October 14, 2025.

== Background ==
=== Die’ced (2022) ===
The original Die’ced was released in 2022 as a micro-budget horror featurette directed by Jeremy Rudd. Set in 1980s Seattle, it followed the story of a scarecrow-masked killer named Benny who escapes from a mental institution on Halloween night. The film received limited coverage in genre-specific horror outlets and was distributed on streaming platforms such as Tubi.

Reviews for the 2022 release were mixed, but horror blogs noted its practical gore effects and low-budget slasher aesthetic. Coverage came from outlets including Dread Central, Movies & Mania, and Jackmeat’s Flix.

== Premise (Reloaded) ==
In the expanded version, the scarecrow-masked serial killer Benny escapes from an asylum on Halloween night and embarks on a violent killing spree in Seattle. His main target is Cassandra, a young woman with a hidden connection to his past. As the night progresses, a group of survivors must try to stop him before more lives are claimed.

== Cast ==
- Eden Campbell as Cassandra
- Jason Brooks as Benjamin "Benny" Newman
- Nigel Vonas as Sheriff Wilcox

== Production ==
Following the original 2022 release, Epic Pictures Group collaborated with Rudd to create Die’ced: Reloaded. According to Rudd, the process involved adding approximately 30 minutes of new material, re-editing existing scenes, and enhancing the sound design, score, and visuals. He cited influences from slasher films such as Halloween, Child’s Play, and Jeepers Creepers.

== Release ==
Epic Pictures released Die’ced: Reloaded in limited theaters across the United States on August 8, 2025. It became available for video-on-demand streaming on August 12, 2025, and is scheduled for Blu-ray release on October 14, 2025.

== Reception ==
Early reviews from genre-focused outlets were generally positive. Macabre Daily described it as "one of our favorite watches of 2025 so far," praising its practical effects and 1980s-inspired production design. All Hallows Geek noted improvements in pacing and visual quality compared to the original Die’ced, while still acknowledging its micro-budget origins. Gazettely scored it 6 out of 10.

Creepy Kingdom wrote that it "isn't a total disaster, but it's not a film I'll remember." Nerdly scored it 1 out of 5.
