= Living Doll (The Twilight Zone) =

- The Twilight Zone episode
- "Talky Tina" was voiced by June Foray
- Episode no.: Season 5 Episode 6
- Directed by: Richard C. Sarafian
- Written by: Jerry Sohl; (Credited to Charles Beaumont)
- Production code: 2621
- Original air date: November 1, 1963

Guest appearances
- Telly Savalas; Mary LaRoche; Tracy Stratford

Episode chronology
| ← Previous "The Last Night of a Jockey" | Next → "The Old Man in the Cave" |
- The Twilight Zone (1959 TV series) (season 5)

"Living Doll" is the 126th episode of the American television anthology series The Twilight Zone. In this episode, an abusive stepfather is haunted by his stepdaughter's new doll threatening him.

== Opening narration ==
Talky Tina, a doll that does everything, a lifelike creation of plastic and springs and painted smile. To Erich Streator, she is a most unwelcome addition to his household—but without her, he'd never enter - the Twilight Zone.

== Plot ==
Annabelle buys her daughter, Christie, a wind-up doll named "Talky Tina" to comfort her. When wound, the doll says, "My name is Talky Tina, and I love you very much". Annabelle has recently remarried to an infertile man named Erich Streator. Frustrated by his inability to have his own children with Annabelle, Erich directs his hostility toward Christie and becomes upset with Annabelle for wasting money by purchasing the doll. Annabelle tries to persuade him that if he gives himself the chance, he will be able to love Christie.

When Erich is alone, and he winds up the doll, it substitutes its catchphrase with antagonisms such as "My name is Talky Tina and I don't think I like you" that become increasingly hostile. At first, Erich blames the doll's manufacturer. However, when the doll begins engaging him in a more elaborate conversation, he concludes that Annabelle is playing a trick to get back at him for his treatment of Christie. He places the doll in a trash can in the garage, but then receives a phone call and hears the doll's voice say "My name is Talky Tina and I'm going to kill you". Checking the trash can, he finds it empty. He confronts Annabelle, but she pleads innocence. It occurs to Erich that since his wife was upstairs putting Christie to bed, she could not possibly have made the phone ring.

He runs upstairs to find the doll in bed with Christie. Erich takes the doll away despite Christie's tearful protests and angrily scolds and corrects her when she addresses him as "Daddy". He attempts to destroy the doll using a vise, a blow torch, and a circular saw, all to no effect; Annabelle attempts to intervene, but Erich furiously pushes her away. He then ties the doll in a burlap sack and returns it to the trash can, weighing the lid with bricks. Annabelle begins packing to leave, unable to tolerate his hostility and irrational behavior any longer. She says that Erich should see a psychiatrist. Erich begins to question whether the doll talking to him is just his imagination, and he offers to return it to Christie if Annabelle will stay. He takes the doll out of the trash and returns it to Christie.

Later that night, Erich is awakened by the sound of muffled whirring. He tells Annabelle to stay in the bedroom and leaves to investigate. Christie is in bed, but Tina is gone. Going down the stairs, he trips over Tina, who is lying on one of the treads, and falls, sustaining fatal injuries. Attracted by the noise, Annabelle finds Erich. Beside him is Tina, who opens her eyes and threatens Annabelle by saying, "My name is Talky Tina... and you'd better be nice to me!" Annabelle drops the doll in shock, realizing that Erich was telling the truth.

== Closing narration ==
Of course, we all know dolls can't really talk, and they certainly can't commit murder. But to a child caught in the middle of turmoil and conflict, a doll can become many things: friend, defender, guardian. Especially a doll like Talky Tina, who did talk and did commit murder—in the misty region of - the Twilight Zone.

== Cast ==
- Telly Savalas as Erich Streator
- Mary La Roche as Annabelle Streator
- Tracy Stratford as Christie Streator
- June Foray as Talky Tina (voice) [uncredited]

Mary La Roche, Tracy Stratford as well as June Foray each worked in one other episode of the original series. La Roche was one of two female leads in first season's last episode "A World of His Own" (July 1960), Stratford was uncredited as third season's "Little Girl Lost" (March 1962) and Foray was again uncredited as the voice of Mary Badham's character in the series' final episode "The Bewitchin' Pool" (June 1964).

== Production ==
The score composed by Bernard Herrmann consists of a solo bass clarinet, flourished by harps and celesta.

The house in this episode was also used in the Twilight Zone episode "Ring-a-Ding Girl" (1963).

The doll used for Talky Tina was produced by the Vogue Doll Company between 1959 and 1961 and marketed under the name "Brikette". In reality, Brikette was a non-talker; on The Twilight Zone she was modeled after Chatty Cathy, a popular talking doll manufactured by Mattel at the time "Living Doll" aired. The voices for both Chatty Cathy and Talky Tina were provided by June Foray, one of the leading voice actresses of the era.

== In popular culture ==
- The episode is noted as having laid the groundwork for the sentient, murderous doll archetype in horror movies such as the Chucky franchise, Annabelle (2014) and M3GAN (2022).
- "Living Doll" is parodied in "Clown Without Pity", a segment of The Simpsons 1992 episode "Treehouse of Horror III". In it, Homer gives Bart a talking Krusty the Clown doll for his birthday, which tries to kill Homer.
- It was parodied in the episode “Good Will Haunting” of Sabrina the Teenage Witch where a “Molly Dolly” doll threatens Sabrina.
- "Living Doll" is also parodied in the "Little Talky Tabitha!" episode of Johnny Bravo.
- The character of Gabby Gabby in Toy Story 4 (2019) is inspired by Talky Tina, according to director Josh Cooley.

== See also ==
- Killer toy
- Dolly Dearest, a 1991 horror movie about a haunted porcelain doll
- Poppy Playtime, a 2021 independent horror game featuring the titular doll

== Bibliography ==
- DeVoe, Bill. (2008). Trivia from The Twilight Zone. Albany, GA: Bear Manor Media. ISBN 978-1-59393-136-0
- Grams, Martin. (2008). The Twilight Zone: Unlocking the Door to a Television Classic. Churchville, MD: OTR Publishing. ISBN 978-0-9703310-9-0
- Zicree, Marc Scott: The Twilight Zone Companion. Sillman-James Press, 1982 (second edition)
