= Suitable Flesh =

2023 film by Joe Lynch

- Theatrical release poster
- Directed by: Joe Lynch
- Screenplay by: Dennis Paoli
- Based on: "The Thing on the Doorstep" by H. P. Lovecraft
- Produced by: Barbara Crampton; Bob Portal; Inderpal Singh; Joe Wicker
- Starring: Heather Graham; Judah Lewis; Bruce Davison; Johnathon Schaech; Barbara Crampton
- Cinematography: David Matthews
- Edited by: Jack N. Gracie
- Music by: Steve Moore
- Production companies: Alliance Media Partners; Eyevox Entertainment
- Distributed by: RLJE Films; Shudder
- Release dates: June 11, 2023 (Tribeca); October 27, 2023
- Running time: 99 minutes
- Country: United States
- Language: English
- Box office: $22,751

Suitable Flesh is a 2023 American horror film directed by Joe Lynch and written by Dennis Paoli, based on H. P. Lovecraft's 1933 short story "The Thing on the Doorstep". It stars Heather Graham, Judah Lewis, Bruce Davison, Johnathon Schaech and Barbara Crampton.

The film premiered at the 2023 Tribeca Festival on June 11. It was released in limited theaters and video on demand on October 27, 2023, before its streaming release on Shudder on January 26, 2024.

== Plot ==
In a psychiatric hospital, Dr. Daniella Upton visits the morgue. There, the mortician dissects a corpse, the victim of a murder. Daniella visits the murderer, her friend Dr. Elizabeth Derby, who begs Daniella to destroy the corpse's brain. Derby begins to recount her story to explain why she must do so.

Psychiatrist Elizabeth Derby lives with her husband Eddie. After a session with a patient, a young man visits her office. He introduces himself as Asa Waite and claims that his father Ephraim is occasionally "using" his body. During the session, Asa receives a call from his father and appears to have a seizure before acting as if nothing happened, as well as behaving differently. Elizabeth is troubled by this development and that evening imagines Asa in Eddie's place while they are having sex. She goes to Asa's house and discovers Ephraim to be horribly sick, relying on pills to keep him alive. After Elizabeth spots a book with creatures and symbols drawn in it, Ephraim wards her off with a large knife.

That night, Asa calls Elizabeth and she drives to his house, finding Ephraim dying on the floor; Asa refuses to let Elizabeth hand him his pills but Elizabeth defies his orders, though she cannot stop Ephraim's apparent death. Asa tells her that they must destroy Ephraim's brain because if he says an incantation a third time, he will take over Asa's body. Ephraim utters the incantation, which causes Asa to have a seizure, before falling limp. Asa, now more confident, has sex with Elizabeth and whispers an incantation in her ear which causes them to briefly switch bodies. He notices that Ephraim's body is missing, prompting him to take the knife and chase after him. "Ephraim" begs Elizabeth to help him, claiming to be Asa trapped in the body. Ephraim, now inhabiting Asa's body, stabs Asa in the neck then decapitates him.

The following day, two detectives stop by the Derby residence to question Elizabeth about a fire at the Waite house, with Ephraim being labeled as a missing person. Elizabeth talks to her friend, fellow psychiatrist Daniella Upton, about the body-switch but Daniella does not understand what she means; later, Elizabeth admits her affair to Eddie. Meanwhile, Ephraim (still in Asa's body) handcuffs himself to a pole in his cellar and calls Elizabeth, reading the incantation and causing the two to switch bodies. While in Elizabeth's body, Ephraim has sex with Eddie; Elizabeth discovers piles of flesh as well as drawings of a creature in the cellar. Realizing that the next body swap will be forever, Elizabeth attempts to jump out of a window at her office but Ephraim arrives and says that she can escape if she kills him and destroys his brain. Upon distracting him, Elizabeth stabs him in the head with his knife before throwing him out of the window; realizing that he is still alive, Elizabeth runs Ephraim over repeatedly with her car before stabbing him to death. She is then apprehended by police officers.

In present day, the mutilated corpse, now revealed to be Ephraim, awakens and utters the incantation one final time, causing him to switch bodies with Elizabeth. Elizabeth in the corpse's body begins to crawl through the hospital while Ephraim decides to switch bodies with Daniella, causing the two of them to fight. In Daniella's body, Ephraim begs security guard Mace to shoot Daniella but she manages to get his gun and euthanizes Elizabeth by shooting her in the head repeatedly. The two switch back and Ephraim shoots Mace to death before continuing to fight; Daniella gets ready to stab him with a scalpel as Ephraim recites the incantation again, before they are separated by police officers. Daniella later consoles Eddie in her office as Ephraim is revealed to be in control of her body while the real Daniella is trapped inside the body of a screaming Elizabeth.

== Cast ==
- Heather Graham as Dr. Elizabeth Derby, a psychiatrist.
- Judah Lewis as Asa Waite, Elizabeth's patient.
- Bruce Davison as Ephraim Waite, Asa's father.
- Johnathon Schaech as Edward Derby, Elizabeth's husband.
- Barbara Crampton as Dr. Daniella Upton, Elizabeth's friend and colleague.
- Graham Skipper as A Pathologist
- Brett Newton as Professor Fisk
- Chris McKenna as Crawley
- J. D. Evermore as Detective Ledger
- Ann Mahoney as Susan
- Jonah Ray Rodrigues as Dave, The Orderly
- Joe Lynch as Ray, The Orderly

== Production ==
Suitable Flesh was directed by Joe Lynch from a script by Dennis Paoli, which is based on H. P. Lovecraft's "The Thing on the Doorstep" (1937). Paoli had a script based on the story for many years before being approached by Barbara Crampton about scripts when the two reconnected for tributes to Stuart Gordon, who had died in 2020. Lynch approached the script with the idea of swapping the gender of the main character. Lynch, noting Lovecraft's love of narrators that recount their points of view, wanted to make the film resemble the erotic thrillers of the late 1980s/early 1990s, "because that's what the character would have found sexy." It is a spiritual successor to Stuart Gordon's 1980s Lovecraftian horror films, Re-Animator and From Beyond. Barbara Crampton stars in the film and produces under her Alliance Media Partners banner. Principal photography began in Jackson, Mississippi in May 2022.

== Release ==
RLJE Films and Shudder acquired the worldwide distribution rights to Suitable Flesh a few days before its world premiere at the Tribeca Festival on June 11, 2023. It premiered at Fantastic Fest on September 24, 2023. The film was released in limited theaters and video on demand on October 27, 2023, before its streaming debut on Shudder on January 26, 2024. It was released on limited edition VHS in March 2024.

== Reception ==
On the review aggregator website Rotten Tomatoes, 85% of 74 critics' reviews are positive, with an average rating of 6.9/10. The website's consensus reads: "Campy and creepy, Suitable Flesh delivers visceral, '80s-inspired horror topped off by game performances from Barbara Crampton and Heather Graham." Metacritic, which uses a weighted average, assigned the film a score of 64 out of 100, based on 12 critics, indicating "generally favorable" reviews.

Meagan Navarro of Bloody Disgusting gave the film a score of four out of five and wrote, "Lynch captures the humorous, oft-sexy tone of Gordon's '80s/'90s Lovecraftian horror output while putting his own stamp on it through keen instincts and modern storytelling". Brian Tallerico of RogerEbert.com said, "Suitable Flesh is kind of tonally inconsistent—I kept wanting it to go "Full Gordon" and really go off the rails as much as it threatens to do so—but it's a fun horror flick, one I could imagine finding on VHS in 1989 and losing my mind over. In other words, a Dennis Paoli flick". He praised Crampton but felt Lewis was "little less effective in that he struggles to sell some of the mischievous charm needed for the role at times".

Peter Bradshaw from The Guardian gave the film a score of two out of five and wrote, "Despite a very game lead performance from Heather Graham, and some amusing 90s-style erotic thriller mannerisms — voile curtains blowing on a hot summer night while a sex scene happens to a wafting sax accompaniment — this left me not knowing quite where to look". Dennis Harvey of Variety wrote, "There's no lack of effort here, but too often Suitable Flesh just feels effortful, rather than the outrageous good time aimed for".
