= Castle Freak =

1995 film by Stuart Gordon

- Theatrical release poster
- Directed by: Stuart Gordon
- Screenplay by: Dennis Paoli; Stuart Gordon
- Produced by: Maurizio Maggi
- Starring: Jeffrey Combs; Barbara Crampton; Jessica Dollarhide; Jonathan Fuller
- Cinematography: Mario Vulpiani
- Edited by: Bert Glatstein
- Music by: Richard Band
- Production company: Full Moon Entertainment
- Distributed by: Full Moon Entertainment
- Release date: November 1995 (Home Video)
- Running time: 95 minutes
- Countries: United States; Italy
- Languages: English; Italian
- Budget: $500,000

Castle Freak is a 1995 direct-to-video horror film directed by Stuart Gordon. The film stars Jeffrey Combs as John Reilly, an American recovering alcoholic who inherits an Italian castle when a distant relative passes away. John stays at the castle with his estranged wife Susan (Barbara Crampton) and blind daughter Rebecca (Jessica Dollarhide), but a freakish monster locked away in the basement (Jonathan Fuller) escapes and commits a series of murders.

An American-Italian co-production, Castle Freak went into production in 1994 after Gordon noticed art for the film in producer Charles Band's office. Gordon agreed to develop the film on Band's condition that the film take place in a castle, contain a freak, and would be shot on a very low budget. Gordon obliged as he would be able to cast who he wanted in the film and would get the final cut. The film was shot in 1994 in a castle owned by Band in Italy, where Gordon had previously shot The Pit and the Pendulum. The film was shot during a period when Full Moon Features was having financial issues and was released to little press on home video in November 1995.

== Plot ==
After inheriting a 12th-century castle which belonged to a famed Duchess in Italy, John Reilly, his wife Susan, and their blind teenage daughter Rebecca travel to Italy to visit. Susan blames John for the death of their five-year-old son in a drunk driving crash which also cost their daughter her eyesight. On the advice of the estate's executor, the three plan to stay at the castle until they can liquidate the estate. Unbeknownst to them, the Duchess' son, Giorgio Orsino, who was imprisoned and tortured by the Duchess, still lives in the dungeons of the castle.

After killing and eating a cat, the disfigured Giorgio escapes by breaking off his own thumb to get out of the manacles which bind him. Giorgio begins to roam the castle, prowling around the bedroom of the terrified Rebecca. When she claims that there is someone else in the house, John believes her but Susan does not. John, still wracked with guilt about the death of his son, turns to drink and hires a prostitute from the nearby town, angering Susan further over his cheating. As she leaves the castle, the prostitute is ambushed and horribly mutilated by Giorgio. The maid discovers the still-living prostitute before she herself is murdered. Susan plans to leave with Rebecca but the police order them to stay while they investigate the missing prostitute.

John learns that Giorgio is his half-brother and that the Duchess was his father's first wife. The Duchess chained Giorgio up and tortured him throughout his life out of spite because her husband abandoned her and their son for her sister, John's mother, and went to America. The police arrest John upon discovering the bodies of the maid and the prostitute. Susan and Rebecca stay the night in the castle, praying together for forgiveness for John. Giorgio kills two policemen, then abducts Rebecca and chains her up in his cell. Susan finds Rebecca and allows Giorgio to seduce her, distracting Giorgio long enough for Susan to stab him. But this only makes him angry and he chases Susan and Rebecca up to the castle's roof. Determined to save his family, John escapes the police station after a fight with a policeman. He returns to the castle for a final confrontation with Giorgio and sacrifices his own life by manacling himself to Giorgio, pulling Giorgio off the roof as well when John leaps from the parapet. Susan tearfully forgives John and they reaffirm their love as he dies. The son of the prostitute is seen with the policeman, the boy's father, at John's funeral.

== Cast ==
- Jeffrey Combs as John Reilly
- Barbara Crampton as Susan Reilly
- Jonathan Fuller as Giorgio Orsino, The Freak
- Jessica Dollarhide as Rebecca Reilly
- Massimo Sarchielli as Giannetti
- Elisabeth Kaza as Agnese
- Luca Zingaretti as Agent Forte
- Helen Stirling as Duchess D'Orsino
- Raffaella Offidani as Sylvana

== Production ==
While preparing to work on Space Truckers, director Stuart Gordon received the opportunity to develop Castle Freak. Gordon was in Charles Band's office and noticed a poster entitled Castle Freak, with a Quasimodo-like man chained to a wall being whipped by a woman. When Gordon asked about it, Band replied, "Well, that's a castle and there's a freak." Band said he had no script, but if Gordon wanted it, he could do whatever he wanted with the idea as long as he maintained the concepts of a castle and a freak. Gordon made the film for about $500,000. When asked why he was prompted to make another low-budget film, Gordon responded that it would be his first film since Re-Animator that he could release without a rating, he would be given final cut on the film, and he had the ability to cast whoever he wanted, stating, "Even though the budget was tiny, I had complete control."

Speaking about the film's influences, Daniele Massaccesi, who was part of the crew, stated that, "Castle Freak is full of Lovecraftian references [...] although the director may argue this point of view." Gordon stated that both himself and screenwriter Dennis Paoli took influence from the short story "The Outsider". The story involves a man leaving his dungeon for the first time in years; everyone he meets flees in terror, and he eventually sees his own distorted body after finding a mirror.

Gordon stated the film was shot quickly; originally approached in January to direct, Gordon was shooting the film by June. Castle Freak was shot in Italy at a castle owned by Charles Band, which Band had bought years earlier. Gordon had shot The Pit and the Pendulum in the same castle four years earlier. According to Jonathan Fuller's film diary, filming was underway until July 1994. His diary states that on July 7, 1994, the crew were a day and a half behind on their shooting schedule. On July 8, 1994, Charles Band arrived at the castle with his wife and father, stating that they were to finish filming by July 9.

== Release ==
Castle Freak was in production when Full Moon Productions was going through financial difficulties. Gordon commented, "I don't think there was any money to do one-sheets [...] There are no posters of that film, but it did manage to find its audience anyway. It's a slow process, people are just beginning to realize that it's out there." Castle Freak was originally set for a home video release by Full Moon on October 24, 1995. Gordon had expressed hope that the film would be released theatrically, but actor Jeffrey Combs commented that he felt that no distribution company would invest in a film that would be released unrated. Castle Freak was eventually released for both VHS and Laserdisc in November 1995 in both R-rated and unrated versions.

It was released for the first time on DVD by Full Moon Home Video on December 16, 1997. Full Moon later re-released the film on October 4, 2005, as a part of its Slab of Horror Movie Pack. On October 10, 2006, it was released by Wizard Entertainment for its four-disc The Stuart Gordon Presents Box Set. Wizard would re-release the film on September 1, 2009, and February 13, 2012, before releasing it for the first time on Blu-ray on May 14, 2013. In between that time, it was released by Echo Bridge Home Entertainment on November 9, 2010, and on February 12, 2013. It was last released on Blu-ray by Ais on August 13, 2013.

== Critical reception ==
Castle Freak has received mixed to positive reviews from critics, although many have praised its disturbing feel and tight storyline. It currently holds a 67% approval rating on movie review aggregator website Rotten Tomatoes based on nine reviews.

Dave Dunwoody from Oh, The Horror! gave the film a positive review, complimenting the film's direction, acting, gore, and make-up and calling it "a standout among Lovecraft movies". In their book Lurker in the Lobby: A Guide to the Cinema of H. P. Lovecraft, Andrew Migliore and John Strysik write: "Castle Freak is a solid, even near-classic horror movie. Unlike the gory roller-coaster rides of Re-Animator and From Beyond, it is very serious and very adult. The only major flaw is one unnecessary and detestable scene of brutal violence." Joel Harley from HorrorNews.net wrote, "Castle Freak is a gem. It's scary, gruesome and disturbing. It's excellently acted by Jeffrey Combs and Barbara Crampton. The cinematography, location, gore and special effects are outstanding. The creature design is awful (in a good way). Stuart Gordon's direction is, of course, great. The plot with Reilly's blind daughter seems somewhat obvious, but thankfully it doesn't take as distasteful a turn as the one with the prostitute. It's a minor work when compared to Re-Animator and From Beyond, but no less effective. In spite of its flaws, it ranks amongst the best Lovecraft adaptations of all time."

TV Guide gave the film a mixed review, awarding it 2/5 stars, writing, "While it lacks the wry, subversive humor of his most popular films, Stuart Gordon's Castle Freak is a scary and satisfying exercise in straightforward horror." Dennis Schwartz from Ozus' World Movie Reviews gave the film a grade of B−, stating that the film was "Not that interesting psychologically and not as freaky as it sounds". Schwartz did however, commend the film's reasonably good acting, and Gothic mood, concluding that the film was "slightly above the average of the usual Haunted House genre offering."

== Possible sequel ==
A sequel was reportedly announced in the mid-2000s alongside a slew of other Full Moon sequels as part of an initiative to revive some of their old series with films such as Demonic Toys 2 and Puppet Master: Axis of Evil. The film never materialized.

== Remake ==
On April 15, 2018, it was announced that Cinestate and Charles Band would be producing a remake/reboot of Castle Freak, along with the film's original star Barbara Crampton also producing and special effects artist Tate Steinsiek set to direct. The movie was initially intended to release at the Chattanooga Film Festival on April 16, 2020, but instead debuted on video-on-demand on December 4, 2020.
