= Carolyn Purdy-Gordon =

American actress

- Born: Carolyn Purdy; June 3, 1947 (age 79); Michigan, U.S.
- Education: University of Wisconsin–Madison
- Occupations: Actress; Writer; Chef
- Years active: 1979–2016
- Spouse: Stuart Gordon (m. 1968; died 2020)
- Children: 3
- Relatives: David George Gordon (brother-in-law)

Carolyn Purdy-Gordon (born Carolyn Purdy; June 3, 1947) is an American former actress, playwright, and chef, best known for her long-time collaboration with her husband and filmmaker Stuart Gordon until his death in 2020.

== Life and career ==
Purdy-Gordon had met her future husband Stuart Gordon while they were both studying at the University of Wisconsin–Madison. He had reportedly drunk dialed her before they officially began dating. They later relocated to Chicago and founded the Organic Theater Company, where her husband served as artistic director, beginning their 50-year long collaboration. With the company through the 1970s to early '80s, Gordon produced and directed thirty-seven plays, co-written by Purdy-Gordon, among them, the world premieres of The Warp Trilogy (Warp! would later be adapted into a comic book by First Comics), David Mamet's Sexual Perversity in Chicago and Bleacher Bums, E/R Emergency Room (which was adapted into the short-lived TV series E/R where Purdy-Gordon wrote each episode and even guest starred in one), and a two-part adaptation of Adventures of Huckleberry Finn. The initial production of Warp, written by Purdy-Gordon and her husband Gordon, was a critical and financial darling for Organic and briefly made it to Broadway, where it failed to repeat its initial success due to attendees reportedly not understanding it. Warp was influential according to theater critic, Richard Christiansen, for being a prelude to the Star Wars franchise and paving the way for additional Chicago theater companies. Their 1973 production of The Wonderful Ice Cream Suit, (turned into a feature film 25 years later) featured an ensemble cast including Dennis Franz, Meshach Taylor, and Joe Mantegna.

Purdy-Gordon appeared in the stage play Switch Bitch for which she was nominated for the Joseph Jefferson Award for Best Actress in a Leading Role during her tenure with the Organic Theatre Company.

Purdy-Gordon is best known for her appearances in her husband's films like Re-Animator (1985), From Beyond (1986), Dolls (1987), and The Pit and the Pendulum (1991) where her characters often met a grisly end. Purdy-Gordon, despite having initially studied acting in university, had no desire to pursue film acting as a full-time career and thus, only appeared in her husband's films with a few exceptions. Her cameo in The Arrival (1991) for instance was done as a personal favor, as her husband was friends with director David Schmoeller, while her small role in Snow White: A Deadly Summer (2012) was as a result of director David DeCoteau having been mentored by Gordon, both directors having worked with Charles Band.

Besides acting, Purdy-Gordon is also known for her cooking skills and often catered for her husband's films. During the 2000s, she also picked up gigs as a caterer for movies, including The Ten (2007) starring Adam Brody, Paul Rudd, Jessica Alba, and Winona Ryder.

== Personal life ==
Purdy-Gordon met her husband when they were both 18 and then married 3 years later on December 20, 1968. The couple had three daughters, named Suzanna, Jillian, and Margaret Gordon respectively.

== Filmography ==
=== Acting ===
Year	Title	Role	Notes
1979	Bleacher Bums	Rose	TV movie
1984	E/R	Mrs. Dobbs	Episode: "All's Well That Ends"
1985	Re-Animator	Dr. Harrod	
1986	From Beyond	Dr. Bloch	
1987	Dolls	Rosemary Bower	
1990	Robot Jox	Kate	
1991	The Pit and the Pendulum	Contessa D'Alba Molina	
1991	The Arrival	Liquor Store Woman	
1992	Fortress	Zed-10	Voice role
1995	Castle Freak	The Gelato People	Direct-to-video
1996	Space Truckers	Delia	
2007	Stuck	Petersen	
2011	The Sailor	Elderly Woman #1	Short film
2012	Snow White: A Deadly Summer	Dr. Beckerman	Direct-to-video
2013	M Is for Mormon Missionaries	Bonnie Phillips	Short film
2016	ABC's of Death 2½	Bonnie Phillips	Segment: "M Is for Mormon Missionaries"

=== Catering ===
Year	Title	Notes
2003	Scarecrow Slayer	Direct-to-video
2004	Dr. Moreau's House of Pain	Direct-to-video
2004	Ring of Darkness	TV movie
2005	Legion of the Dead	Direct-to-video
2006	The Pill	Short film
2007	The Ten	
2008	Wreck the Halls	Short film
2009	Alien Presence	
2009	Evil Bong 2: King Bong	
2012	Snow White: A Deadly Summer	Direct-to-video
2012	Killjoy Goes to Hell	
2013	Hansel & Gretel: Warriors of Witchcraft	
2013	Unlucky Charms	
2013	Gingerbread Man vs. Evil Bong	
