= The Black Cat (Masters of Horror) =

- Masters of Horror episode
- Episode no.: Season 2 Episode 11
- Directed by: Stuart Gordon
- Teleplay by: Dennis Paoli; Stuart Gordon
- Based on: The Black Cat by Edgar Allan Poe
- Original air date: January 19, 2007

Guest appearances
- Elyse Levesque; Jeffrey Combs

Episode chronology
← Previous "We All Scream for Ice Cream"	Next → "The Washingtonians"

"The Black Cat" is the eleventh episode of the second season of the American anthology television series Masters of Horror. Directed by Stuart Gordon and written by Gordon and Dennis Paoli, the episode stars Jeffrey Combs as writer Edgar Allan Poe, who becomes increasingly psychologically unstable as a series of setbacks and tragedies combine with his alcoholism and dark imagination.

Though the plot is a generally faithful adaptation of Poe's 1843 short story The Black Cat, it is also a metafictional narrative, setting Poe himself as the story's protagonist, blending fictionalized elements of his actual biography with details from the story and culminating in the writing of the story itself. Combs, Gordon and Paoli had already adapted a different Poe story in 1991's The Pit and the Pendulum and would return to the character of Poe in the same respective roles for the successful one-man stage show Nevermore: An Evening With Edgar Allan Poe which premiered at The Steve Allen Theater in 2009 and has since been revived several times.

== Plot ==
The film opens with Edgar Allan Poe reading the second verse of his poem A Dream Within a Dream to his much-younger wife (and cousin) Virginia Eliza Clemm Poe. She is delighted by the poem, but when Poe tries to kiss her, she begins coughing up blood. She dismisses his concern, blaming allergies to the hair of Pluto, her black cat.

Later, Poe successfully sells his poems to Graham's Magazine, whose editor, George Rex Graham (depicted as having two different-colored eyes, a feature implied to be an inspiration for the "Vulture eye" in Poe's story The Tell-Tale Heart) recognizes them as having already been published in other periodicals, but pushes Poe to write another "mad tale." His dismissive attitude towards poetry prompts Poe to have a violent fantasy about strangling him, but in reality he meekly requests an advance on a new story, which Graham obliges.

Despite his dire financial state, however, Poe spends the money drinking in a bar (where he encounters future biographer Rufus Griswold), from which he is ejected after running out of cash and perpetrating a crooked bar bet on the tavern keeper. Drunk, he stumbles home to find Virginia in the process of selling her piano. Poe, drunk and shocked that she would sell her beloved instrument, resists, despite Virginia's reminder that they need the money. Relenting, he asks her to play a piece "one last time," only to have her performance of Thomas Moore's Come, Rest In This Bosom (said to have been Poe's favorite song) interrupted by a sudden, copiously bloody coughing spell.

A doctor diagnoses Virginia with Consumption, but becomes angry and leaves when Poe cannot pay his fee, pointing out that Poe has chronically shirked his bills. Desperate to earn some money, and encouraged by Virginia, Poe sits in front of a blank piece of paper but suffers writer's block. Late that night, he discovers that Pluto the cat has killed their other pets, a goldfish and a parakeet. In a fit of rage, Poe gouges out one of the cat's eyes, but is interrupted by a Virginia. He denies harming the animal, but Virginia accuses him of drinking. He miserably confesses that he has "this longing in my soul to do violence. To the ones I love, to my own nature. Wrong for wrong's sake." Before she can respond, Virginia collapses and dies in his arms.

Somewhat later, at Virginia's wake, an inconsolable Poe chases away the mourners. When they're gone, he gets drunk and hangs Pluto, then pours oil from a gas lamp around the room, planning to immolate himself along with Virginia's and Pluto's corpses. To his shock, however, Virginia suddenly wakes up, apparently having only appeared dead (evoking several Poe stories, including "The Premature Burial", "The Fall of the House of Usher" and "Berenice"). As the fire spreads (the burning corpse of Pluto resembling the grim climax of Poe's Hop-Frog), Poe rescues Virginia and flees the scene.

Some time later, Poe and Virginia are living in a squalid boarding house, and Poe is startled by the sudden appearance of another one-eyed cat, who Virginia, not knowing the real Pluto's fate, at first assumes to be her pet. The cat now has a white ring around his neck, mimicking the noose that killed him. An increasingly distraught Poe continues drinking—despite promising Virginia that he would stop—hiding his bottle behind a loose brick in the basement wall. When she unexpectedly confronts him, he confesses he doesn't know how she can love him, since he can't cure her, can't take care of her, and continues to be unable to write. When the cat appears, he flies into a homicidal rage and accidentally kills Virginia with an ax blow meant for the cat.

Panicking, he makes a hole in the brick wall he used to store his alcohol and bricks her body inside (mimicking the events of both The Black Cat and, to some extent, The Cask of Amontillado). The police are suspicious, explaining that neighbors reported screams, but after they search Poe's room—finding nothing, as the body is in the building's basement—they turn to leave. Apparently free and clear, Poe suddenly calls after them to search the basement, even taunting them to check the walls and refusing to let them leave. Suddenly, a wailing is heard from the wall behind which Virginia's body is hidden. Breaking it open, they policemen discover her corpse—and a wailing cat with one eye, apparently walled in with her.

Poe flees in a panic, but suddenly finds himself back in his old house, with a still-alive Virginia coughing in the next room. A two-eyed Pluto meows at their feet. Apparently the events since Virginia's bloody piano recital have all been a nightmare. Overcome with relief, he embraces Virginia. The next day he is seen writing his story The Black Cat, apparently inspired by his dream to write again.

== Cast ==
- Elyse Levesque - Virginia Poe
- Jeffrey Combs - Edgar Allan Poe
- Aron Tager - George Graham
- Patrick Gallagher - Barman
- Christopher Heyerdahl - Rufus Griswold
- Ian Alexander Martin - Mr. Fordham
- Ken Kramer - Doctor
- Eric Keenleyside - Sgt. Booker

== Release and reception ==
The episode premiered on Showtime on January 19, 2007; it was released on DVD July 17 of the same year. Reviews were generally positive; Brett Gallman of Oh, The Horror called it "a well-wrought little yarn that marries the short film format to the original story in an admirable fashion," and "a neat film that attempts to understand the demons that spoke to Poe: his insecurities, his paranoia, his tortured genius, and, most importantly, his undying love for his wife.". Writing for Fangoria, Michael Gingold praised Combs' performance, saying he "evokes Poe’s mania, torment and even his romantic side with equal skill, creating a fully formed portrait of the artist as a very troubled man," and that "the craft and pacing are perfectly scaled for [Masters Of Horror]'s modestly budgeted one-hour format," though he noted that the (fictitious) animal abuse depicted in the film may be "a sticking point for some viewers." Cinemablend's Brian Holcomb also praised the episode, saying, "The Black Cat gets it just right, using the one hour length to its advantage by tightening the pace like a vice around its protagonist’s head," and singled out Combs for praise: "A few minutes into the episode you lose all thoughts about... Combs the actor and feel as though you are spending time with the great writer himself. No greater compliment can be paid to an actor than to say that he showed us the humble nature of a human being. Combs deserves the full measure of this compliment."
