= The Pit and the Pendulum (1991 film) =

1991 American horror film

- Video release poster
- Directed by: Stuart Gordon
- Screenplay by: Dennis Paoli
- Based on: "The Pit and the Pendulum" and "The Cask of Amontillado"; 1842 story by Edgar Allan Poe
- Produced by: Albert Band; Charles Band; Michael Catalano
- Starring: Lance Henriksen; Rona De Ricci; Jonathan Fuller; Jeffrey Combs; Tom Towles; Stephen Lee; William J. Norris; Frances Bay; Oliver Reed
- Cinematography: Adolfo Bartoli
- Edited by: Andy Horvitch
- Music by: Richard Band
- Production company: Full Moon Features
- Distributed by: Paramount Home Video
- Release date: June 27, 1991
- Running time: 97 minutes
- Country: United States
- Language: English
- Budget: $2,000,000 (estimated)
- Box office: $3,331 (USA)

The Pit and the Pendulum (released on DVD in the United States as The Inquisitor) is a 1991 American horror film directed by Stuart Gordon and based on the 1842 short story by Edgar Allan Poe. The film is an amalgamation of the aforementioned story with Poe's "The Cask of Amontillado", and it also appropriates the anecdote of "The Sword of Damocles", reassigning it to the character of Torquemada.

== Plot ==
In 1492 Spain, Grand Inquisitor Torquemada leads a bloody reign of terror. Opposed to the use of torture by the Church, Maria speaks out during the public execution of a disenfranchised noble family. Torquemada is tempted by Maria's beauty, and atones through self-torture. Confused by these new desires, he accuses Maria of witchcraft and orders that she be tortured until she confesses. During Maria's interrogation, Torquemada cannot stop himself from staring at her naked body; he orders that she be imprisoned. Maria is befriended by fellow prisoner Esmerelda, a confessed witch. Together they struggle to save themselves from the sinister Torquemada. Maria's husband Antonio breaks into the castle to rescue his innocent wife. He fails and is imprisoned for his actions. Torquemada decides to test a new torture device, the Pit and the Pendulum, on Antonio.

== Cast ==
- Lance Henriksen as Torquemada
- Rona De Ricci as Maria
- Jonathan Fuller as Antonio
- Frances Bay as Esmeralda
- Mark Margolis as Mendoza
- Jeffrey Combs as Francisco
- Stephen Lee as Gomez
- Tom Towles as Don Carlos
- William J. Norris as Dr. Huesos
- Carolyn Purdy-Gordon as Contessa D'Alba Molina
- Oliver Reed as Cardinal
- Benito Stefanelli as Executioner
- Geoffrey Copleston as Butcher

== Production ==
Stuart Gordon wanted make a new adaptation of The Pit and the Pendulum as he was a big fan of the writings of Edgar Allan Poe as well as the Roger Corman produced films based upon Poe's writings and felt like there was a whole new generation of audiences who had not yet been exposed to Poe. Gordon's recent visit to the Tower of London as well as the "visual and action-oriented" of the story attracted Gordon to The Pit and the Pendulum as he felt a story set during a time of cruelty and terror like the Spanish Inquisition would allow him to explore the horror of human cruelty. Gordon pitched the project to frequent collaborator Charles Band as he felt major studios wouldn't be enthused about the film's grim subject matter and would allow Gordon to take advantage of the Italian setting of Band's studio rather than staging it as if it were the United States as they had done on prior films they'd done together. In order to adapt the story to film, Gordon re-teamed with Dennis Paoli as he'd successfully adapted H. P. Lovecraft's stories for Gordon's prior films Re-Animator and From Beyond. As The Pit and the Pendulum was only 15 pages long and didn't lend itself to feature length, both Gordon and Paoli worked on expanding the story using similar approaches such as combining other elements from Poe's work including using Poe's The Cask of Amontillado. Gordon and Paoli also added significant material centered around Torquemada whom the two extensive researched through Torquemada's books detailing the rules of torture as well as transcriptions from the trials overseen by him.

Gordon's The Pit and the Pendulum was initially set up with Vestron Pictures as the primary financier with a planned $6 million budget and Peter O'Toole and Sherilyn Fenn set to star. As Vestron wanted a major star for the film, O'Toole was cast as Torquemada but due to a custody arrangement involving O'Toole's son where he couldn't leave England during certain months of the year this resulted in the entire production relocating to England's Elstree Studios to accommodate O'Toole's travel restrictions. Once Vestron went bankrupt, this iteration of the project was delayed by a full year and lost O'Toole. Despite the fact O'Toole didn't end up playing Torquemada, Gordon credited O'Toole with how they ultimately approached him as a character:

OToole had some interesting ideas about how Torquemada should be played, which were terrific, and we ended up using them. Torquemada does not see himself as a villain. He sees himself on a mission from God. So, rather than playing him as this snarling, evil presence, we decided to make him a very driven man who has this sense that God is speaking directly to him, which gives him the divine right to disregard the Pope and everyone else in order to do what he thinks has to be done.

Gordon compared Torquemada as depicted in the film as an indictment on the religious hypocrisy of figures such as Jim Bakker and Jimmy Swaggart and felt the film was a cautionary tale on the fundamentalists getting so much power.

After Vestron's collapse the film was rescued Band and set it up at Paramount Pictures as his production company Full Moon Features had a strong relationship with them having provided several films for their Home video division. Upon seeing the screenplay for The Pit and the Pendulum, Paramount green lit the film $2 million, which was roughly twice the going budget for one of Band's home video productions as Paramount wanted to leave the option open for a theatrical run.

== Release ==
The film was given quick runs at many film festivals until its home video release in the summer of 1991.

== Critical reception ==
The Pit and the Pendulum has received a mixed reception from critics, and currently holds a 56% 'rotten' rating on movie review aggregator website Rotten Tomatoes based on nine reviews.

== See also ==
- The Pit and the Pendulum – 1961 film starring Vincent Price and directed by Roger Corman, released 30 years earlier

== Works cited ==
- Charles Leayman. "A serious work, mired in maladroit attempts at hip hilarity" in "Reviews". Cinefantastique. Volume 22. Number 3: December 1991. p 55.
- Blu-ray Review: The Pit and the Pendulum (1991). Starburst.
- "The Pit and the Pendulum" (1995) 26 Cinefantastique 38
- Sova. Critical Companion to Edgar Allan Poe. Revised Edition. Facts on File. 2007. p 143.
- Huckvale. Poe Evermore: The Legacy in Film, Music and Television. Macfarland. 2014. p 143.
- Concerning Evil. 2013. p 70 & 71.
- Fischer. Science Fiction Film Directors, 1895-1998. Macfarland. 2000. p 253.
