= Dennis Paoli =

Screenwriter and playwright

Dennis Paoli is a screenwriter and playwright. He is mainly known for his collaborations with director Stuart Gordon.

== Career ==
Paoli studied and graduated from the University of Wisconsin–Madison in 1969. Paoli first met Stuart Gordon from high school in Chicago, with both bonding over reading and movies. The two became roommates at Wisconsin.

He has notably written or co-written works based on the writings of H.P. Lovecraft, such as the films Re-Animator (1985), From Beyond (1986) and Dagon (2001) and the Masters of Horror episode "H. P. Lovecraft's Dreams in the Witch-House", all directed by Gordon, with whom Paoli also collaborated on the stage productions of Bleacher Bums, Re-Animator: The Musical, and Nevermore: An Evening with Edgar Allan Poe. He also wrote another Lovecraft adaptation, the film Suitable Flesh (2023) directed by Joe Lynch.

Paoli serves as the coordinator of the Hunter College writing center. He retired from his teaching job at Hunter College prior to the COVID-19 pandemic. He established the Heidi Paoli Fund in honor of his late wife (d. 1987) to distribute donations to approved cancer charities from a variety of fundraising sources.

== Filmography ==
=== Film ===
Year	Title	Director(s)	Role	Co-writer(s)	Ref.
1985	Re-Animator	Stuart Gordon	Screenwriter	Stuart Gordon and William J. Norris	
1986	From Beyond	Stuart Gordon	Screenwriter and story writer	Brian Yuzna^{S} and Stuart Gordon^{S}	
1988	Ghoulies II	Albert Band	Screenwriter	Charlie Dolan^{S}	
1988	Spellcaster	Rafal Zielinski	Screenwriter	Charlie Bogel and Ed Naha^{S}	
1988	Pulse Pounders	Charles Band	Screenwriter	Danny Bilson and Paul DeMeo	
1990	Meridian: Kiss of the Beast	Charles Band	Screenwriter	Charles Band^{S}	
1991	The Pit and the Pendulum	Stuart Gordon	Screenwriter		
1993	Body Snatchers	Abel Ferrara	Screenwriter	Stuart Gordon, Nicholas St. John, Raymond Cistheri^{S} and Larry Cohen^{S}	
1995	Castle Freak	Stuart Gordon	Screenwriter and story writer	Stuart Gordon^{S}	
1996	The Dentist	Brian Yuzna	Screenwriter	Stuart Gordon and Charles Finch	
2001	Dagon	Stuart Gordon	Screenwriter		
2023	Suitable Flesh	Joe Lynch	Screenwriter		

=== Television ===
Year	Title	Director(s)	Role	Co-writer	Notes	Ref.
1992	Mortal Sins	Bradford May	Writer	Greg Martinelli	Television film	
2001	Bleacher Bums	Saul Rubinek	Writer	Mitch Paradise	Television film	
2005; 2007	Masters of Horror	Stuart Gordon	Writer	Stuart Gordon	Episodes: "H. P. Lovecraft's Dreams in the Witch-House" "The Black Cat"	

=== Stage ===
Title	Role	Co-writer(s)	Ref.
Bleacher Bums	Playwright	Roberta Custer, Richard Fire, Dennis Franz, Stuart Gordon, Joe Mantegna, Josephine Paoletti, Carolyn Purdy-Gordon, Michael Saad, Ian Patrick Williams and Keith Szarabajka	
Re-Animator: The Musical	Playwright	Stuart Gordon and William J. Norris	
Nevermore: An Evening with Edgar Allan Poe	Playwright		

- An ^{S} indicates a story writer.
