= Ted Sorel =

American actor

- Born: Theodore Eliopoulos; November 14, 1936; San Francisco, California, U.S.
- Died: November 30, 2010 (aged 74); Englewood, New Jersey, U.S.
- Occupations: American film, stage and television actor
- Spouse: Jacqueline Coslow (m. 1964)
- Children: 2

Theodore Eliopoulos (November 14, 1936 – November 30, 2010), known as Ted Sorel, was an American actor whose numerous credits included Guiding Light, Law & Order and Star Trek: Deep Space Nine. He also appeared in film productions, including the science fiction-horror film From Beyond (1986) as the villainous, mutating Dr. Edward Pretorius, and the horror film sequel Basket Case 2 (1990).

== Life and career ==
Sorel was born in 1936 in San Francisco, California, the son of Maria (née Piccoulas) and Vassily Eliopoulos, a candy maker. He later adopted the professional name of Ted Sorel. His family had originally immigrated to the United States from their village of Kyparissi, Laconia, in Greece. Sorel would later renovate his grandfather's home in Kyparissi during his life. He received his bachelor's degree from the University of the Pacific in Stockton, California.

Sorel resided in Katonah, New York, for much of his acting career. He died from stroke at the Lillian Booth Actors' Home in Englewood, New Jersey, on November 30, 2010, at the age of 74.

== Family ==
Ted was the nephew of the movie makeup artist Jack Pierce. He was survived by his wife, the actress Jacqueline Coslow (the daughter of the late actress Esther Muir and late composer Sam Coslow); two children and a granddaughter.

== Filmography ==
Year	Title	Role	Notes
1973	Jeremy	Music Class Teacher	
1973	Lenny	New York Attorney	
1976	Network	Giannini	
1982	The Clairvoyant	Ben Cosley	
1983	Without a Trace	Dr. Sorel	
1986	From Beyond	Dr. Edward Pretorius	
1990	Basket Case 2	Phil	
1993	Star Trek: Deep Space Nine	Kaval	Episode: Duet
1994	Who Do I Gotta Kill?	George Stelloris	
