= Dance of the Dead (Masters of Horror) =

- Masters of Horror episode
- DVD cover
- Episode no.: Season 1 Episode 3
- Directed by: Tobe Hooper
- Story by: Richard Matheson
- Teleplay by: Richard Christian Matheson
- Editing by: Andrew Cohen
- Production code: 103
- Original air date: 11 November 2005
- Running time: 59 min.

Guest appearances
- Erica Carroll; Robert Englund; Emily Graham; Lucie Guest; Jessica Lowndes; Ryan McDonald; Marilyn Norry; Melena Ronnis; Jonathan Tucker

Episode chronology
← Previous "H. P. Lovecraft's Dreams in the Witch-House"	Next → "Jenifer"

"Dance of the Dead" is the third episode of the first season of Masters of Horror. It originally aired in North America on 11 November 2005. Richard Christian Matheson adapted the episode from a 1954 short story of the same name by his father, Richard Matheson. Smashing Pumpkins frontman Billy Corgan scored this episode.

== Plot ==
In 2008, terrorists developed a biological weapon called "Blizz". They used this weapon in local weather patterns in the United States. As it falls from the sky, it will instantly burn any living thing it touches. At her seventh birthday party, young Peggy watched as her friends were killed by Blizz, while she, her sister, and her mother took refuge inside the house, refusing to allow anyone else shelter with them.

Ten years later, America has been ravaged by the effects of World War III. The death count continues to rise in this dark and bleak future and some states simply no longer exist. Peggy is now almost 17, ignorant of the world outside her mother's diner. She has lost both her father and her sister, Anna, and now depends on her mother, Kate. Business is slow, but Kate tells Peggy they're fine financially, as Peggy's father left them some money before his death in the war. One day, Peggy meets biker and drug addict Jak and his two "friends", junkies Boxx and Celia. The three are into some shady dealings with a nightclub called The Doom Room, located in the grubby town of Muskeet.

Kate warns Peggy that "everything the people of Muskeet do is a goddamn trick", and although she's afraid to disobey her mother, Peggy sneaks out with Jak in the middle of the night to the Doom Room with Boxx and Celia. Muskeet, as it appears, is completely ravaged and the home to ravagers, sociopathic bikers, and teenagers. The Doom Room is a heavy metal bar run by an MC. As Peggy and Celia watch the band Decree perform, Boxx and Jak go behind the stage to perform a business deal with the MC. They provide him packets of blood. The MC promises that he will pay them if their product is good enough for the next "performance". If not, he'll make them eat it.

At that point, Peggy witnesses what the performance is. The MC has collected the bodies of overdosed teens, called LUPs (Living Undead Phenomenon, or "loopies") injecting them with a drug that causes their hearts to beat twice as fast as normal resulting in convulsions and seizures. This drug was first discovered in the battlegrounds of the war, so the dead soldiers could get up and keep fighting. They are then pumped with blood and forced to dance, and those who can't move are shocked with electric prods. Peggy watches in horror as the MC brings out her own sister, Anna.

When Anna falls off the stage, Peggy and Jak take her away from the Doom Room, to be followed by the MC and one of his goons. Peggy and Jak meet up with Kate, who has tracked them to Muskeet. The MC sheds some light on how he came to "own" Anna. When she was still alive, Anna was just like the other teenagers in Muskeet, and Kate was sick of having to drag her out of the Doom Room every weekend. Then Anna overdosed on drugs, so Kate decided to sell her to the MC, although she was still alive.

Kate is pistol whipped multiple times by the MC and tries to explain to Peggy that she sold Anna because she was always in trouble, and they had nothing, the money Peggy's father had allegedly left them is a lie, they have been living off the money the MC paid her for Anna. Furious at what her mother did, Peggy trades her for Anna and buries her sister, whom she considers her last remaining family. In the end, Peggy becomes another Muskeet teenager, now romantically involved with Jak, and watches as Kate's corpse is beaten with electric rods and forced to dance in the Doom Room.

== Critical reception ==
Dread Central wrote, "This is Hooper at his best. Gratuitous, nihilistic, and unhinged. Disengaged from whatever power that has been holding him back for so many years."
