= From Beyond (film) =

1986 film by Stuart Gordon

- Theatrical release poster
- Directed by: Stuart Gordon
- Screenplay by: Dennis Paoli
- Story by: Brian Yuzna; Dennis Paoli; Stuart Gordon
- Based on: "From Beyond" by H. P. Lovecraft
- Produced by: Brian Yuzna
- Starring: Jeffrey Combs; Barbara Crampton; Ken Foree; Ted Sorel; Carolyn Purdy-Gordon
- Cinematography: Mac Ahlberg
- Edited by: Lee Percy
- Music by: Richard Band
- Distributed by: Empire Pictures (United States); Vestron Pictures (International)
- Release date: October 24, 1986
- Running time: 86 minutes
- Countries: United States; Italy
- Language: English
- Budget: $2.5 million
- Box office: $1.2 million

From Beyond is a 1986 science fiction body horror film directed by Stuart Gordon, loosely based on the short story of the same name by H. P. Lovecraft. It was written by Dennis Paoli, Gordon and Brian Yuzna, and stars Jeffrey Combs, Barbara Crampton, Ken Foree and Ted Sorel.

From Beyond centers on a pair of scientists attempting to stimulate the pineal gland with a device called the Resonator, with the unforeseen result of their perceiving creatures from another dimension. The creatures drag the head scientist into their world, returning him as a grotesque shape-shifting monster that preys upon the others at the laboratory. It was a co-production between the United States and Italy.

== Plot ==
Dr. Edward Pretorius, a hedonistic and overly-ambitious scientist, has developed the Resonator, a machine that allows observers within its effective range to see beyond perceptible reality. His assistant, Dr. Crawford Tillinghast, activates the machine, sees strange creatures in the air and is bitten by one. Upon being notified by Crawford, Pretorius, driven by lust for power and knowledge, turns the machine on at full power and becomes mad with the feelings the Resonator causes. As the Resonator malfunctions, Crawford panics and flees. Police arrive to find Pretorius decapitated but bloodless. Crawford is arrested for murder.

In a psychiatric ward, Crawford is treated by Dr. Katherine McMichaels. After giving his account of Pretorius' death, Crawford undergoes a CT scan, which shows his pineal gland enlarged and growing. Convinced of his innocence, Katherine has Crawford released into her custody. The two, along with Detective Bubba Brownlee who investigates Pretorius' death, go to Pretorius' house.

After restoring the machine with Katherine's help, Crawford reactivates it. More creatures appear along with a naked Dr. Pretorius. His consciousness now altered and expanded, Pretorius tells of a world beyond that is more pleasurable than normal reality, and that his death was a means of ascending to this state of existence. Pretorius attacks Crawford, Bubba, and Katherine with slime-covered arms. Crawford shuts off the Resonator, making Pretorius and the creatures vanish.

Katherine thinks the Resonator could shed light on victims of schizophrenia and brain damage and suggests they turn it back on, but Bubba and Crawford disagree. While Bubba and Crawford are asleep Katherine turns it back on, bringing forth the now-mutated Pretorius. Pretorius grabs Katherine, preparing to absorb her mind and take her to the world of beyond. Crawford and Bubba go down into the basement to shut off the power but encounter a giant worm-like monster which attacks Crawford. Bubba successfully shuts off the power, rescuing Crawford and Katherine and sending Pretorius away.

Bubba decides they should leave the house. Pretorius returns, now able to manifest in our reality through his own willpower, and reactivates the Resonator, forcing the three to run into the attic to deactivate it. Katherine and Crawford are attacked by bee-like creatures that tear away at them and as Bubba pushes them out of the way, he is devoured to the bone. Crawford fights off Pretorius and frees Katherine, but then his enlarged pineal gland forces its way out of his forehead. Katherine short-circuits the machine by spraying it repeatedly with a fire extinguisher.

She takes Crawford back to the hospital, where she is evaluated for insanity and schizophrenia, since her story was just like Crawford's. As Katherine is being prepared for shock treatment by a sadistic staff member, Crawford develops an overwhelming hunger for human brains and kills Katherine's superior Dr. Bloch. Katherine escapes and drives back to the house with a bomb. A crazed Crawford follows her, killing two orderlies along the way.

Katherine places the bomb on the Resonator but Crawford attacks her. As he is about to eat her brain, she bites off his pineal gland, causing him to come to his senses. Dr. Pretorius' will reconnects the severed wires of the Resonator and fixes the short-circuit damage. A mutated Pretorius returns and forcibly assimilates Crawford. Before Pretorius can do the same to Katherine, Crawford's consciousness fights for control within Pretorius; the opposing consciousnesses tearing their shared body apart. Katherine escapes through the attic window just as the bomb explodes, destroying the Resonator and killing both Pretorius and Crawford.

Katherine breaks her leg in the fall and the neighbors gather around her as she suffers a mental and emotional breakdown, saying "It ate him!" between mad laughter and crying.

== Cast ==
- Jeffrey Combs as Dr. Crawford Tillinghast
- Barbara Crampton as Dr. Katherine McMichaels
- Ted Sorel as Dr. Edward Pretorius
- Ken Foree as Bubba Brownlee
- Carolyn Purdy-Gordon as Dr. Bloch
- Bunny Summers as Neighbor Lady
- Bruce McGuire as Jordan Fields

== Production ==
Director Stuart Gordon had previously worked with actors Jeffrey Combs and Barbara Crampton on Re-Animator, and he cast them in part because he had become used to working with a company of actors during his time in theater, and felt that doing the same thing with Lovecraft movies would allow the actors to adapt more quickly to his direction. He was interested in the possibility of making a series of H. P. Lovecraft films with the same cast, like Roger Corman's Edgar Allan Poe adaptations. Gordon, Combs, and Crampton would work together on a third Lovecraft adaptation in 1995, the direct-to-video Castle Freak, and Gordon would later direct versions of two more of Lovecraft's works: the film Dagon in 2001, and the second episode of the Masters of Horror television series, H. P. Lovecraft's Dreams in the Witch-House, in 2005. Many members of the production staff for Re-Animator also held similar roles in the production of From Beyond, including screenwriter Dennis Paoli, producer Brian Yuzna, executive producer Charles Band, director of photography Mac Ahlberg, and special effects artists John Carl Buechler and John Naulin.

Albert Band, who served as the production manager of From Beyond, also makes an uncredited appearance as a wino. Gordon's then-wife Carolyn Purdy-Gordon was cast in a small role in many of Gordon's films, and in From Beyond she played Dr. Bloch, the subject of the notorious eyeball-sucking scene.

From Beyond was shot in Italy with an Italian crew in order to save money. Gordon says that the film would have cost fifteen million dollars to make in the United States, whereas the foreign production enabled him to hold costs to approximately two and a half million dollars. It was shot on a soundstage called Dinocitta just outside Rome. Dinocitta was originally constructed by Dino DeLaurentiis, but was seized by the government for nonpayment of taxes, and then sold to Empire Studios. From Beyond was one of the first films shot at that venue during its period of ownership by Empire. Gordon shot his film Dolls at the same time, and it was released the following year.

As with his earlier film Re-Animator, Gordon made use of medical advisors to be sure that the actions taken by the doctors and nurses of the film followed proper medical procedures. Four separate special effects teams worked on the effects for From Beyond. According to Yuzna, the production ran out of money before the effects on the finale could be finished.

According to Gordon, securing an "R" rating from the MPAA was a challenging ordeal, because the MPAA told him that it was the cumulative effect of the graphic content rather than any specific content in his first presented cut of the film that went beyond what audiences would expect from an "R" rated film, making it difficult for him to know what he needed to cut in order to get an "R" rating. He submitted multiple cuts of the film to the MPAA, each time making small trims without removing any entire sequences, before they at last sent him a message that if he cut a single specific frame, they would give it an "R". He later said that this process ended up making the film stronger, since the final cut left more to the viewer's imagination and gave viewers less time to study the special effects and figure out how they were done.

== Release ==
MGM released an unrated cut of From Beyond, containing the footage which was deleted from the film in order to get it an "R" rating. From Beyond had previously only been released in its original R-rated form. This longer, "director's cut" version aired on the Monsters HD Channel and was subsequently released on DVD by MGM on September 11, 2007.

On March 26, 2013, Scream Factory released a Collector's Edition of the unrated "director's cut" of From Beyond on a Blu-ray/DVD combo pack.

== Awards and reception ==
The film received mostly positive reviews from critics. On the review website Rotten Tomatoes, the film maintains a 73% approval rating from critics based on 73 reviews. The consensus summarizes: "Though it sacrifices some depth in its characterizations, From Beyond stands as a stunningly grotesque Lovecraft adaptation with a dazzling blend of chilling effects and brainy, cosmic horror."

Roger Ebert of the Chicago Sun-Times gave the film two-and-a-half stars out of four and wrote that it "lacks the single-minded weirdness of Gordon's first film, but it does establish him in the tradition of Hollywood horror directors who really try - directors including James Whale, Tod Browning and Roger Corman. At a time when almost any exploitation movie can make money if its ads are clever enough, this is a movie that tries to mix some satire and artistry in with the slime." Variety noted, "Less wigged-out and somewhat more conventional than his wild debut feature, Re-Animator, Stuart Gordon's H.P. Lovecraft followup, From Beyond, still stands as an effectively gruesome horror entry that should please fans of the genre." A generally negative review from Vincent Canby of The New York Times reported that the film "sounds rather more entertaining than it is to watch" and described the monsters as "less scary than technically arresting." Patrick Goldstein, film critic for the Los Angeles Times, said that while From Beyond is more conventional than Re-Animator, lacking its comedic angle, it has similarly excellent pacing, visual symbolism, and gruesomeness. He wrote, "From Beyond is a horror movie with some deliciously slimy tricks for the kids, but some shocking treats for grown-ups too." Gene Siskel, film critic with the Chicago Tribune, also enjoyed the movie, awarding it three stars out of four and calling it "a decent enough low-budget horror film that delivers what audiences have every reason to expect - a funny, horrific grossout." William Wolf with the Gannett News Service rated the film half-a-star out of four. He criticized the movie for its strong gore content as well as the sado-masochistic treatment of women. In his review Wolf wrote, "The gore gets progressively more stomach-turning without much cleverness, and after a while From Beyond just becomes overkill, more revolting than scary or funny."

John Nubbin reviewed From Beyond for Different Worlds magazine and stated that "As long as Stuart Gordon and his companions keep turning out high-quality work like From Beyond, the rest of us should be just as happy that he is a part of that group as well."

AllMovie's review of the film was favorable, writing "Gordon is that rare breed who truly finds inspiration in another creator and uses that inspiration to craft a film that captures the essence of that creator while still being totally and uniquely his own", calling it a "gory thrill ride of a movie."

The film score by Richard Band won the award for Best Original Soundtrack at the Sitges - Catalan International Film Festival in Sitges, Spain.

In their book Lurker in the Lobby: A Guide to the Cinema of H. P. Lovecraft, Andrew Migliore and John Strysik write that "From Beyond is a visual treat," but add that the film's "gross sexual excess may displease hardcore Lovecraft fans."

== Sequel miniseries ==
In 2021, a miniseries directed and written by William Butler titled The Resonator: Miskatonic U was released to the Full Moon Features App and Amazon Prime Video, before making its way to Blu-ray and DVD that same year.
