= The Washingtonians =

- Masters of Horror episode
- Episode no.: Season 2 Episode 12
- Directed by: Peter Medak
- Written by: Richard Chizmar; Johnathon Schaech
- Production code: 212
- Original air date: January 26, 2007

Guest appearances
- Johnathon Schaech; Venus Terzo; Saul Rubinek; Chris Kalhoon; Richard Stroh; Julia Tortolano

Episode chronology
← Previous "The Black Cat"	Next → "Dream Cruise"

"The Washingtonians" is the twelfth episode of the second season of Masters of Horror, directed by Peter Medak. The episode is based on the short story written by Bentley Little. It details a man discovering a shocking secret about George Washington that could shatter the world's view of America forever and the murderous brotherhood sworn to keep the secret safe.

== Plot ==
Mike Franks (Johnathon Schaech) discovers a strange letter hidden behind a portrait of George Washington while searching through the home of his recently deceased grandmother. The letter states, "I will skin your children and eat them. Upon finishing, I shall fashion utensils out of their bones." with the signature "G. W.", along with a fork presumably made out of human bone. After his grandmother's funeral, her friend Samuel Madison (Myron Natwick) tries to persuade Mike to give him the letter. When Mike refuses, members of a psychotic patriots group, with wooden teeth and dressed in powdered wigs and American Revolutionary War attire, begin to stalk the family and they eventually try to break into their house. They demand the letter, but are forced to leave when Mike calls the police.

Mike turns to Professor Harkinson (Saul Rubinek), a trusted friend and employee of the local university, for information. Harkinson tells him about "the Washingtonians" and how history has been based on a false image designed to hide the truth, referring to Washington's cannibalism and the fact that Benjamin Franklin is a composite character based on the accomplishments of several other individuals. They are soon attacked by the Washingtonians once again and, although Harkinson manages to escape with the letter, Mike, his wife Pam (Venus Terzo) and daughter Amy (Julia Tortolano) are abducted and taken to Mount Vernon, the home of the killer President.

It is here the Washingtonians' murderous and cannibalistic nature is verified, when Mike and his family are taken into a large, opulent dining room and witness a table full of Washingtonians, (including Samuel and other townspeople they had met previously), feast on a mutilated human body. The Washingtonians unveil the secret of their renowned leader. However, before any of the Washingtonians can do harm to Mike and his family, Harkinson and a team of FBI agents break in and kill all of the Washingtonians. Harkinson returns the letter to Mike and asks him to expose the truth to the whole world.

In the epilogue, which takes place six months later, the Franks have become vegetarians and to their shock Washington's face on the United States one-dollar bill is replaced with that of George W. Bush.

== Changes from the original story ==
The Masters of Horror episode was played in a more camp style than the original short story's black humor, and the ending was changed. Rather than having Harkinson and his fellow rescuers be redcoats, police arrive with him instead and the Washingtonians are simply put down. The episode's epilogue was also an addition.

== Reception ==
The film was derided as unintentionally funny and accused of delivering "the world's worst Bush punchline".
