= We All Scream for Ice Cream (Masters of Horror) =

- Masters of Horror episode
- Episode no.: Season 2 Episode 10
- Directed by: Tom Holland
- Written by: David Schow
- Original air date: January 12, 2007

Guest appearances
- Lee Tergesen; Colin Cunningham; William Forsythe

Episode chronology
← Previous "Right to Die"	Next → "The Black Cat"

"We All Scream for Ice Cream" is an episode of the series Masters of Horror directed by Tom Holland. It was based on the story "You Scream, I Scream, We All Scream for Ice Cream" by John Farris; the title evoking the song "I Scream, You Scream, We All Scream for Ice Cream".

== Plot ==
A father, named Kent, is pleading for his young son not to eat an ice cream cone, but to no avail—the ice cream is eaten and Kent shockingly dissolves into a puddle of melted ice cream. At Kent's funeral, Layne Banixter, one of his childhood friends, attends. While there, Layne observes a shaggy individual hiding back in the trees, smirking. While Layne is at a pub, his friend, Toot, is drinking himself into a stupor. Toot claims that Kent was in a closed casket because there was nothing left of him but his clothes. He insists that Layne's moving back to town has created bad luck for everyone. Around midnight, Layne heads home and observes several children in a trance, standing outside, clutching coins with an eerie chant of "We all scream for ice cream".

Worried, Layne goes to bed. His wife is concerned at his distant behavior, and she urges him to tell her what's wrong. Layne tells his wife of his childhood, and the local ice-cream man named Buster Dawkins. He was a decent soul who drove an ice-cream truck and wore a clown suit. The neighborhood bully, Virgil Constance, had pulled off his clown nose to reveal a burnt stub – Buster had no real nose. Layne ends the story there, stating that one day, Buster simply died. Then he gets a phone call and arrives at the scene of Toot's death – his clothes in a pile of something gooey. Layne's wife demands to know what part of the story he omitted. Distressed, Layne tells her that Virgil planned a prank on Buster that one of them would release the brake on his truck and make it roll down the hill. Virgil forced Layne to pull the brake, and the truck began rolling straight towards Buster. Too busy picking up fallen coins to notice, Buster was run over by the truck and killed.

That night, Layne goes to see the adult Virgil, the shaggy man he spotted at the funeral. Virgil eventually tells Layne that Buster has returned as a malevolent ghost for revenge for their fatal prank. While they are talking, a ghostly ice-cream truck stops nearby in front of a little girl - a probable child of Virgil's rapes. Buster reaches out of his truck to her, and his horribly-scabbed hand gives the girl a treat. He tells her she can use it to get revenge. Upon the girl biting into it, Virgil melts away, screaming as layers of skin and flesh strips off him like ice-cream.

Layne returns home with a plan. He begs his wife to take their children away to their grandmother's house for one day while he fixes things. After they leave, he tests the garden devices with a remote, then uses ice cream from a bucket in the freezer to create a shape. He wraps the treat with one of Buster's wrappers that Layne had thrown away.

Upon hearing the ice-dream truck's creepy tune, Layne, carrying a small cooler, walks outside for a showdown. His children, lured by Buster from the car a short distance away, run to them. Buster's vengeful spirit offers an ice-cream (shaped like Layne) to Layne's kids. Layne and Buster struggle until Layne turns on the garden sprinklers, freezing the clown. Layne's son sees the ice-cream treat Layne had dropped, and it's shaped exactly like Buster. The boy bites into it, and the clown dies. In the next scene, everything appears normal again and the family is about to move away from that town, but suddenly Layne hears the old creepy tune again, and the film ends with a flash of Buster's rotten face.

== Cast ==
- William Forsythe - Buster Dawkins
- Brent Sheppard - Kent
- Colin Cunningham - Adult Virgil Constance
- Samuel Patrick Chu - Young Virgil Constance
- Lee Tergesen - Layne Banixter
- Lyle St. Goddard - Toot
- Tim Henry - Papa Joe
- Layne - Lee Tergesen
- Brett Kelly - Young Joe
- Zack Luwdwig - Young Kent

== Reception ==
CineMagazine rated it 2.5 stars.
