= Stephen Lee (actor) =

American actor (1955–2014)

- Born: November 11, 1955; Englewood, New Jersey, U.S.
- Died: August 14, 2014 (aged 58); Los Angeles, California, U.S.
- Education: Avila College
- Occupation: Actor
- Years active: 1981–2014

Stephen Lee (November 11, 1955 – August 14, 2014) was an American actor from Englewood, New Jersey.

== Early life ==
Lee was born in Englewood, New Jersey. He was raised in Kansas City, Missouri. He studied at Avila College.

== Career ==
Lee appeared in over 90 television shows, including playing the role of the annoying cabinet installer on Seinfeld, Leo, Ray's friend, in the pilot of Everybody Loves Raymond, criminal informant Tony B in seven episodes of Nash Bridges, a foreign diplomat on the 1980s television show Night Court, as well as several episodes of Dark Angel where he played Dan Vogelsang, a private investigator. He had parts in fourteen movies, including La Bamba, Dolls, WarGames, RoboCop 2, The Negotiator, and others. Lee also guest starred in two episodes of Star Trek: The Next Generation.

== Death ==
On August 14, 2014, Lee died of a heart attack at the age of 58.

== Filmography ==
Year	Title	Role	Notes
1983	WarGames	Sgt. Schneider	
1984	Purple Hearts	Wizard	
1984	Crimes of Passion	Jerry	
1986	The Golden Girls	Dwayne	Episode: "Vacation"
1987	Dolls	Ralph Morris	
1987	La Bamba	The Big Bopper	
1988	Portrait of a White Marriage	Frenchy Kandinsky	
1988	Kid Safe: The Video	Ernie	
1989	Star Trek: The Next Generation	Chorgan	Episode: "The Vengeance Factor"
1989	Family Ties	Mr. Parker	
1990	RoboCop 2	Duffy	
1991	The Pit and the Pendulum	Gomez	
1993	Prehysteria!	Rico Sarno	
1993	Babylon 5	Tharg	Episode: "Believers"
1994	Who Do I Gotta Kill?	Bobby Blitzer	
1995	Black Scorpion	Captain Strickland	
1996	Carnosaur 3: Primal Species	Sergeant	
1996	Black Scorpion II	Captain Strickland	
1996	Everybody Loves Raymond	Leo	Episode: "Pilot"
1997	Seinfeld	Conrad	Episode: "The Nap"
1997–2000	Nash Bridges	Tony B.	7 episodes
1998	The Negotiator	Farley	
2000	Lured Innocence	Chuck	
2001	CSI: Crime Scene Investigation	Dominic Kretzker	Episode: "Boom"
2002	So Little Time	Ted Morrison	Episode: "The Job"
2003	Line of Fire	Brett Rawlings	Episode: "Take the Money and Run"
2004	The West Wing	Registered Voter	Episode: "The Benign Prerogative"
2005	Commander in Chief	Stephen Wilding	Episode: "First Choice"
2007	Boston Legal	Aaron Sears	Episode: "Son of the Defender"
2007	NCIS	Chuck Bayliss	Episode: "Designated Target"
2010	Ghost Whisperer	George Masters	
2010	Burlesque	Dwight	
