= Kid Safe: The Video =

- Directed by: Stuart Gordon
- Written by: Stuart Gordon
- Produced by: Stuart Gordon
- Starring: Andrea Martin
- Cinematography: Stephen Ashley Blake
- Edited by: Jonathan Lapidese
- Music by: Jonathan Pearthree
- Production companies: Master Digital, Inc.
- Distributed by: Triaminic; American Academy of Pediatrics
- Release date: 1988
- Running time: 28 minutes
- Country: United States
- Language: English

Kid Safe: The Video is a 1988 direct-to-video short film. It was written and directed by horror filmmaker Stuart Gordon. It was released on a VHS that was obtained via a coupon giveaway by the sponsor of the video Triaminic. It features SCTV alumni Andrea Martin and Joe Flaherty, the latter hosting the video as Count Floyd and presenting it as an installment of Monster Horror Chiller Theater. It also features an appearance from Jason Voorhees of the Friday the 13th series.

== Plot ==
Kathy Tudor is left home alone when her parents go out on a stormy night. She is frightened by scary movies while channel surfing, and goes to the kitchen to make some cinnamon toast. When she puts it in the toaster she hears a noise in the other room which ends of being a tree branch scratching against the window. The smoke alarm goes off from the toast burning and she burns her fingers and gets an electric shock while attempting to remove the toast with a fork. She calls 911 and says to send help fast and then hangs up. Later a fireman, medic and police officer show up, size up the situation and give her a lecture on safety and then leave. Ernie tests her by knocking on the door pretending to delivering a check for the lottery, and she opens the door. They warn her never to let strangers in, then each of them give her 3 safety questions and then leave. She receives another knock on the door and a man says he has a flat tire and needs to use the phone. She says that he will go somewhere else. The person knocking turns out to be Jason Voorhees, accompanied by a witch, werewolf, mummy and an alien.

== Cast ==
- Andrea Martin - Kathy Tudor
- Shuko Akune - Tina the Paramedic
- Stephen Lee - Ernie the Policeman
- Meshach Taylor - Marty the Fireman
- Joe Flaherty - Count Floyd
- Daniel Wells - Jason
- Grenelda Thornberry - Witch
- John Vulich - Werewolf
- Keith Edmier - Mummy
- Greg Cannom - Alien
