= Re-Animator: The Musical =

Re-Animator the Musical
- Music: Mark Nutter
- Lyrics: Mark Nutter
- Book: Stuart Gordon; William J. Norris; Dennis Paoli
- Basis: 1985 film Re-Animator and related franchise
- Productions: 2011 Los Angeles; 2012 New York; 2012 Edinburgh

Re-Animator: The Musical is an American musical stage-play based on the 1985 film Re-Animator which was adapted from the stories by H.P. Lovecraft. First performed in 2011 at The Steve Allen Theater in Los Angeles, California, the show won several awards including the LA Weekly award for Best Musical. One critic for Variety praised it, saying "not since 'Little Shop of Horrors' has a screamfest tuner so deftly balanced seriousness and camp."

== Synopsis ==
Medical student Herbert West develops a glowing green serum that brings the dead back to life to catastrophic results. After the mysterious death of his mentor Dr. Gruber in Switzerland, West transfers to Miskatonic University in Arkham, Mass. to continue his studies. West enlists his friend Dan Cain to help him with his experiments, much to the chagrin of Dan's fiancée Megan Halsey, daughter of the dean of the medical school. Dr. Carl Hill tries to steal the re-agent and West beheads him and then brings him back to life.

== Production ==
Original Re-Animator film director Stuart Gordon, who began his entertainment career by co-founding Chicago's Organic Theater Company, began thinking of a stage adaptation in the early part of the century. He was partially inspired by the movie-to-musical adaptation Little Shop of Horrors.

Similar to Evil Dead: The Musical, fans can enjoy the "splatter zone"—the first three rows of the theater where patrons can count on a good blood-soaking.

=== Los Angeles production ===
The musical debuted at The Steve Allen Theater in March 2011.

It won the Best Book award from the Ovation Awards and the Los Angeles Drama Critics Circle Award for Best Musical Score. In addition, it also won 6 awards from LA Weekly.

=== New York production ===
The production appeared at the New York Musical Theatre Festival in July 2012.

=== Edinburgh production ===
The production made its international debut at the Edinburgh Fringe Festival in August 2012.

== Creative team ==
It was produced by Dean Schramm and Stuart Gordon. The music and lyrics are by Mark Nutter. Peter Adams was the musical director and Cynthia Carle supplied the choreography. Re-Animator: The Musical was developed and premiered at the Steve Allen Theater under the artistic direction of Amit Itelman.

Cast members of the original Los Angeles production included Graham Skipper, George Wendt, Chris L. McKenna, Jesse Merlin, Rachel Avery, Cynthia Carle, Marlon Grace, Liesel Hanson, Mark Beltzman and Brian Gillespie.
