= Stuart Gordon =

American film and theatre director and writer (1947–2020)

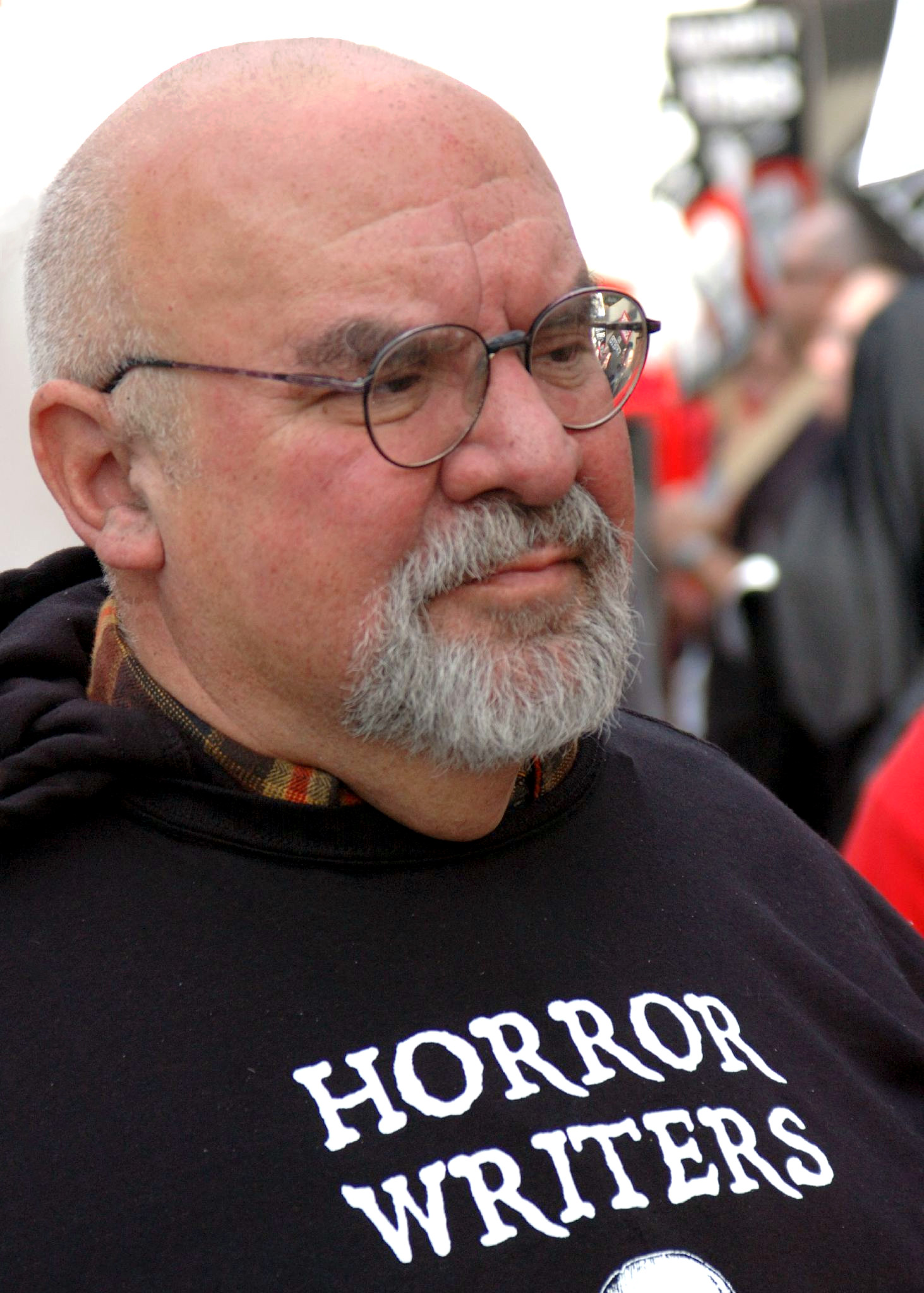
- Gordon during the 2007–08 Writers Guild of America strike
- Born: August 11, 1947; Chicago, Illinois, U.S.
- Died: March 24, 2020 (aged 72); Los Angeles, California, U.S.
- Education: University of Wisconsin–Madison
- Occupations: Director; screenwriter; playwright; film producer
- Known for: Organic Theater Company; Re-Animator; From Beyond; Robot Jox; Honey, I Shrunk the Kids; Fortress; The Wonderful Ice Cream Suit; H. P. Lovecraft's Dreams in the Witch-House
- Spouse: Carolyn Purdy-Gordon (m. 1968)
- Children: 3
- Relatives: David George Gordon (brother)

Stuart Alan Gordon (August 11, 1947 – March 24, 2020) was an American filmmaker, theatre director, screenwriter, and playwright. Initially recognized for his provocative and frequently controversial work in experimental theatre, Gordon began directing films in 1985. Most of Gordon's cinematic output was in the horror genre, though he also ventured into science fiction and film noir.

Born in Chicago, Gordon became known for experimental and sometimes controversial live theater at the University of Wisconsin in the late 1960s. Moving back to Chicago, he founded and led the Organic Theater Company. In the early 1980s, Gordon went to California to pursue movie making.

Like his friend and fellow filmmaker Brian Yuzna, Gordon was a fan of H. P. Lovecraft and adapted several of the author's stories for the screen, including Re-Animator, From Beyond, and Dagon, as well as the Masters of Horror episode Dreams in the Witch-House. He turned to the work of Edgar Allan Poe on two occasions, directing The Pit and the Pendulum in 1991 and The Black Cat for the Masters of Horror series in 2007. Gordon published several books, including The Eyes Trilogy, Watchers, and numerous encyclopedias with The Paranormal: An Illustrated Encyclopedia and The Encyclopedia of Myths and Legends, among others. Several of his films have gone on to become cult classics.

== Early life and education ==
Stuart Alan Gordon was born on August 11, 1947, in Chicago, Illinois, the son of Rosalie (Sabath), a high school English teacher, and Bernard Gordon, a cosmetics factory supervisor. After graduating from Lane Technical High School, Gordon worked as a commercial artist apprentice prior to enrolling at the University of Wisconsin–Madison. Unable to get into the film classes, he enrolled in an acting class and ended up majoring in theater. During this time, he founded his first theatre company, Screw Theater.

== Career ==
=== Theatre ===
In late March 1968, Gordon produced The Game Show on the Play Circle stage of the University of Wisconsin–Madison's Wisconsin Union Theater. The play, intended to be an attack on apathy, locked the audience in the theater and seemingly humiliated, beat and raped them (audience plants were used). Every performance ended with the audience rioting and stopping the show.

THE GAME SHOW's game is you. It is completely dedicated to destroying the complacency of every member in the audience, to making you react. It wants you to get up and be forcibly smashed in the head and the body, it wants you to throw up, to scream out, to lose the trust of the person sitting right next to you, to reach and act. It wants you -all by yourself- to do something.

Gordon then formed Screw Theater in the summer of 1968 and produced and directed four shows, the final one, in the fall of 1968, a political version of Peter Pan that got him and his future wife arrested for obscenity. The story made national headlines until the charges were dropped in November 1968. As Gordon described it in a 2001 interview:

I had been protesting against the war in Viet Nam, and got tear-gassed by the Chicago police, and it suddenly struck me that you could take Peter Pan and turn it into a political cartoon about the whole situation. So, Peter Pan became the leader of the hippies and yippies, Captain Hook became Mayor Daley, and the pirates became the Chicago police. We left all of the James Barrie dialogue intact, so when they all went off to Neverland they sprinkled pixie dust on themselves and think lovely thoughts, and up they go. That was an acid trip, which was visualized by a psychedelic light show that was projected onto the bodies of seven naked young ladies ...

After the University of Wisconsin demanded future theatrical productions by Screw Theater be overseen by a university professor, Gordon cut his University ties to form Broom Street Theater. Its first production, the new translation of the risque Lysistrata, premiered in May 1969.

Later that year, with his wife Carolyn Purdy-Gordon, he relocated to Chicago and founded the Organic Theater Company, for which Gordon also served as artistic director. With the company through the 1970s to early '80s, he produced and directed thirty-seven plays, among them, the world premieres of The Warp Trilogy (Warp! was later adapted into a comic book by First Comics), David Mamet's Sexual Perversity in Chicago and Bleacher Bums, E/R Emergency Room (which was adapted into the short-lived TV series E/R), and a two-part adaptation of Adventures of Huckleberry Finn. The initial production of Warp, co-written by Gordon, was such a huge hit for Organic that it briefly made it to Broadway, where it proved to be little understood. Warp was influential according to the theater critic, Richard Christiansen, for anticipating Star Wars and giving rise to additional Chicago theater companies. Gordon's 1973 production of The Wonderful Ice Cream Suit,(which 25 years later he made into a movie) featured an ensemble cast that included Dennis Franz, Meshach Taylor, and Joe Mantegna. Other work with Mamet and Mantegna also proved successful.

In 2009, he directed the one-man theatrical show, Nevermore...An Evening with Edgar Allan Poe, which reunited him with Re-Animator alumnus, actor Jeffrey Combs and writer Dennis Paoli. Nominated for a Saturn award, the show enjoyed success at its premiere in Los Angeles and toured the country. In 2011 Gordon produced, directed and co-wrote the book for Re-Animator: The Musical. It played to sold-out houses, rave reviews, and standing ovations for six months at the Steve Allen Theater. In 2012, it was performed at the New York Musical Theater Festival (NYMF) and the Edinburgh Fringe Festival. Gordon's next play Taste, premiered at Los Angeles' Sacred Fools Theater Company in April 2014. The play, based on the true story of Armin Meiwes, the Rotenburg Cannibal, was written by Benjamin Brand.

In 1977, Gordon adapted Kurt Vonnegut's The Sirens of Titan for the Organic with the input and approval of Vonnegut himself. 40 years later, in 2017, Gordon updated and revised his adaptation for a production at Sacred Fools, directed by Ben Rock.

=== Film and television ===
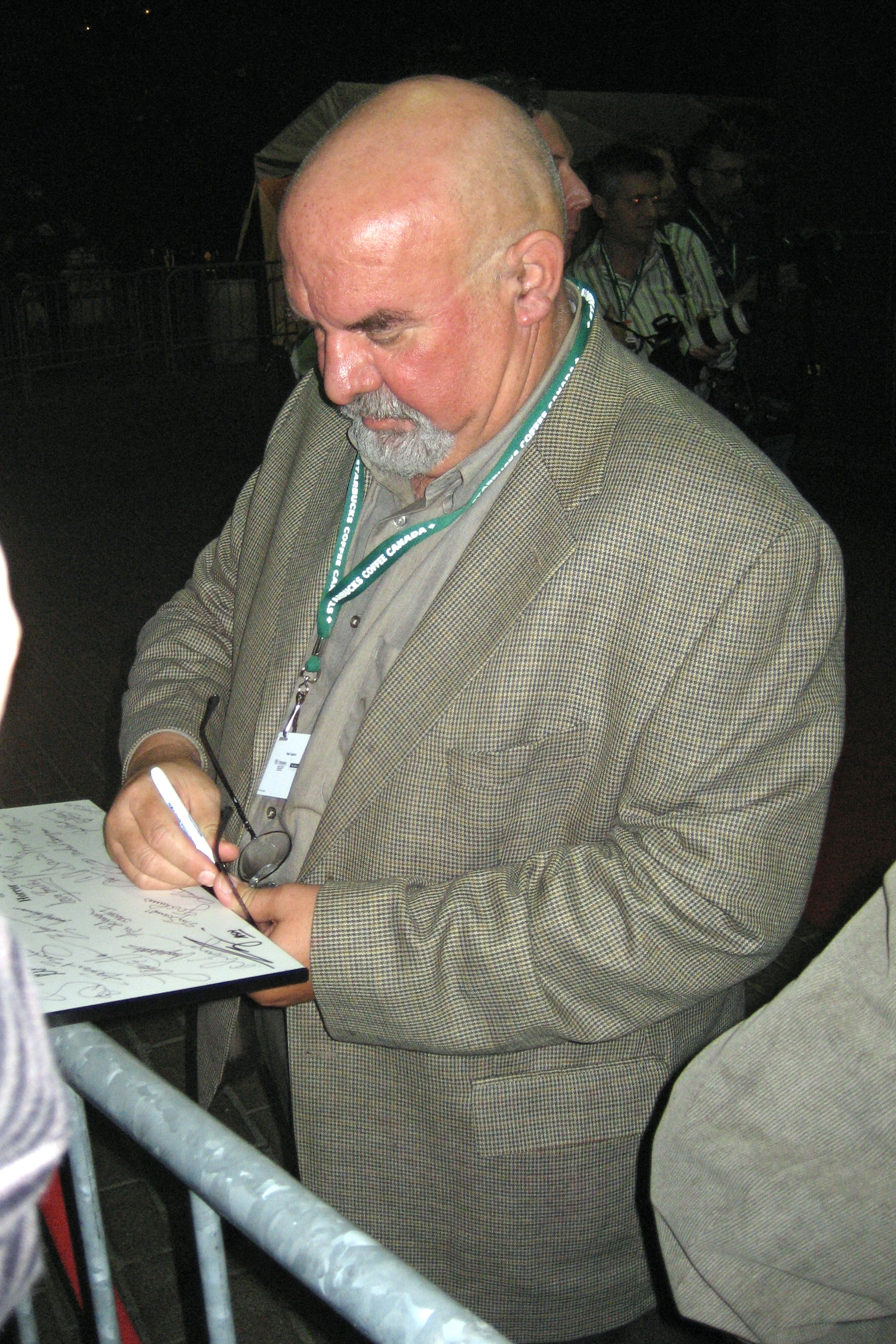
Gordon at the premiere of Stuck, Toronto International Film Festival 2007

Gordon started his film career making horror films for Empire Pictures. His first two, Re-Animator (1985) and From Beyond (1986), were both adaptations of H.P. Lovecraft material. Also for Empire was Dolls in 1987. His next two projects were surprisingly family friendly. First up was Kid Safe: The Video, a short safety film for kids released direct-to-video. Following that, with Brian Yuzna and writer Ed Naha, he co-created Honey, I Shrunk the Kids for Disney Studios (he later executive produced the sequel Honey, I Blew Up the Kid). He also co-wrote Body Snatchers for Warner Brothers in 1993 and The Dentist for Trimark in 1996.

He produced, co-wrote and directed the science fiction comedy Space Truckers starring Dennis Hopper in 1996. He also produced and directed The Wonderful Ice Cream Suit written by Ray Bradbury in 1998.

In 2003 he turned to film noir and produced and directed King of the Ants based on the novel by Charlie Higson. This was followed by a film adaptation of David Mamet's dark play Edmond starring William H. Macy in 2006. And in 2007 he produced, co-wrote and directed Stuck starring Stephen Rea and Mena Suvari.

He also directed "Eater", an episode of Fear Itself, for NBC in 2008.

Stuart Gordon has also been a contributor to Blu-ray/DVD extras content (liner notes) for cult film distributors Grindhouse Releasing/Box Office Spectaculars on one of his favorite films, Frank and Eleanor Perry's The Swimmer starring Burt Lancaster.

== Personal life and death ==
Gordon married Carolyn Purdy in 1968 and often cast her in his films, usually as ill-fated characters. He was father of three daughters, Suzanna, Jillian and Margaret. He spent the latter half of his life in Los Angeles, residing in Valley Glen. Gordon died in Van Nuys, Los Angeles on March 24, 2020, of multiple organ failure, aged 72.

== Filmography ==
=== Feature films ===
| Year | Title | Director | Writer | Producer | Ref. |
|---|---|---|---|---|---|
| 1985 | Re-Animator | Yes | Yes | No | |
| 1986 | From Beyond | Yes | Adaptation | No | |
| 1987 | Dolls | Yes | No | No | |
| 1989 | Honey, I Shrunk the Kids | No | Story | No | |
| 1990 | Robot Jox | Yes | Story | No | |
| 1991 | The Pit and the Pendulum | Yes | No | No | |
| 1992 | Honey, I Blew Up the Kid | No | Characters | Executive | |
| 1992 | Fortress | Yes | No | No | |
| 1993 | Body Snatchers | No | Yes | No | |
| 1995 | Castle Freak | Yes | Story | No | |
| 1996 | The Dentist | No | Yes | No | |
| 1996 | Space Truckers | Yes | Story | Yes | |
| 1996 | Robo Warriors | No | Characters | No | |
| 1997 | Honey, We Shrunk Ourselves | No | Characters | No | |
| 1998 | The Wonderful Ice Cream Suit | Yes | No | Yes | |
| 1998 | Progeny | No | Story | Executive | |
| 1998 | The Dentist 2 | No | Characters | No | |
| 2001 | Dagon | Yes | No | No | |
| 2002 | DeathBed | No | No | Yes | |
| 2003 | King of the Ants | Yes | No | Co-producer | |
| 2005 | Edmond | Yes | No | Yes | |
| 2007 | Stuck | Yes | Story | Yes | |

=== TV films ===
| Year | Title | Director | Writer | Producer | Ref. |
|---|---|---|---|---|---|
| 1979 | Bleacher Bums | Yes | No | Stage | |
| 1990 | Daughter of Darkness | Yes | No | No | |
| 2001 | Bleacher Bums | No | Play | Co-executive | |

=== Short films ===
| Year | Title | Director | Writer | Producer | Ref. |
|---|---|---|---|---|---|
| 1988 | Kid Safe: The Video | Yes | Yes | Yes | |
| 1994 | Aliens: Ride at the Speed of Fright | Yes | No | No | |
| 2000 | Snail Boy | No | No | Executive | |

=== TV series ===
| Year | Title | Director | Writer | Producer | Notes | Ref. |
|---|---|---|---|---|---|---|
| 1984–1985 | E/R | No | Play | No | | |
| 1997–2000 | Honey, I Shrunk the Kids: The TV Show | Yes | Characters | No | Episode: "Honey, Let's Trick or Treat" | |
| 2005–2007 | Masters of Horror | Yes | Yes | No | Episodes: "Dreams In the Witch-House" & "The Black Cat" | |
| 2008 | Fear Itself | Yes | No | No | Episode: "Eater" | |

== Stage credits ==
- Peter Pan (1968)
- Warp! (1971)
- Bleacher Bums (1977–1979)
- The Little Sister (1979)
- E/R Emergency Room (1982)
- Nevermore...An Evening with Edgar Allan Poe (2009–2014)
- Re-Animator: The Musical (2011)
- Taste (2014)

== Bibliography ==
About Gordon

- Stuart Gordon: Interviews edited by Michael Doyle, University Press of Mississippi, 2022. ISBN 9781496837738

Written by Gordon

- Naked Theater & Uncensored Horror: A Memoir by Stuart Gordon, FAB Press, 2023. ISBN 9781913051235
- The New American Crime Film by Matthew Sorrento (foreword), McFarland, 2012. ISBN 9780786459209

== Awards and nominations ==
| Year | Title | Award/Nomination |
|---|---|---|
| 1979 | Bleacher Bums | Chicago / Midwest Emmy Award for Outstanding Achievement - Single Program |
| 1985 | Re-Animator | Caixa de Catalunya (Sitges Film Festival); Special Mention (Avoriaz Fantastic Film Festival); Jury Award for Best Film (Fantafestival) |
| 1986 | From Beyond | Prize of the Catalan Screenwriter's Critic and Writer's Association (Sitges Film Festival) |
| 1990 | Robot Jox | Nominated- International Fantasy Film Award |
| 1991 | The Pit and the Pendulum | Nominated- International Fantasy Film Award |
| 1996 | Space Truckers | Nominated- Maria Award for Best Film (Sitges Film Festival) |
| 1998 | The Wonderful Ice Cream Suit | Jury Award for Best Direction (Fantafestival); Nominated- International Fantasy Film Award |
| 1999 | Progeny | Nominated- International Fantasy Film Award |
| 2001 | Dagon | Nominated- Maria Award for Best Film (Sitges Film Festival) |
| 2005 | Edmond | New Visions Award (Sitges Film Festival); Nominated- Grand Special Prize (Deauville Film Festival); Nominated- Best Film - International Competition (Mar del Plata International Film Festival) |
| 2007 | Stuck | Staff Prize for Narrative Feature (San Francisco Indiefest); Silver Raven (Brussels International Fantastic Film Festival); Nominated- Maria Award for Best Film (Sitges Film Festival) |
