= H. P. Lovecraft's Dreams in the Witch-House =

- Masters of Horror episode
- Episode no.: Season 1 Episode 2
- Directed by: Stuart Gordon
- Written by: Dennis Paoli; Stuart Gordon
- Story by: H. P. Lovecraft
- Production code: 102
- Original air date: November 4, 2005

Guest appearances
- Ezra Godden; Chelah Horsdal; Campbell Lane; David Nykl

Episode chronology
← Previous "Incident On and Off a Mountain Road"	Next → "Dance of the Dead"

"H. P. Lovecraft's Dreams in the Witch-House" is the second episode of the first season of Masters of Horror, directed by Stuart Gordon. It is adapted from the short story "The Dreams in the Witch House" by American horror author H. P. Lovecraft. It originally aired in North America on November 4, 2005. Ezra Godden had previously starred in another Stuart Gordon-directed Lovecraft adaptation, Dagon, based on Lovecraft's novella The Shadow over Innsmouth.

== Plot ==
University student Walter Gilman moves to a very cheap room in an old boarding house. He hears screaming and rushes to help his neighbour, Frances, who was being chased by a large rat. He seeks assistance from the manager, but he refuses to help. One of the tenants, Masurewicz, asks Walter if the large rat had a human face. He becomes close with Frances the following week, and even lends her money to keep her in the boarding house.

While studying for his thesis, Walter finds Masurewicz praying and hitting his head on a chair. The old man advises Walter about a rat with a man's face and a witch that would be after him. He warns Walter that the house is evil, relating that he, like Walter, moved in at a young age in the same room that Walter is currently renting. He states he is still in the house only to pray to stop her. Masurewicz offers Walter a crucifix for his protection, but Walter rebuffs the gesture.

Frances gets a job interview and asks Walter to watch her son Danny. After she leaves, Danny begins to cry if he isn't in Walter's hands. Walter notices that Danny is wearing a large crucifix. When Walter falls asleep, a cloaked witch appears as a nude Frances. Walter embraces her, and she begins to claw the skin off of his back. Initially ignoring the pain, he becomes horrified when she transforms into an old witch and laughs devilishly as he screams in horror, making him wake up outside of Frances's room. He rushes back when he hears Danny crying. Frances returns and questions Walter over why he left Danny, and upon explaining his dreams, Frances suggests he seek psychiatric help.

He goes back to his room, and it is revealed that the witch has actually carved a pentagram into his back. He lays flour on his floor to make sure he isn't sleepwalking. When awoken by an audible disturbance, he sees tracks in the flour leading under his bed. He peers down and is snatched by a mysterious hand, after which he finds himself in a dark corridor, with the rat on his shoulder. The rodent repeatedly implores him to "sign" and bites his wrist. Walter then finds himself seated in front of an open book that he has bled on in the restricted access room of a library in Miskatonic University, in which he sees diagrams of unearthly geometry and rituals for infant sacrifice. The book is revealed to be the "Necronomicon". Walter attempts to warn Frances, but she repeats to him that he must seek psychological help and asks him to stay away from Danny.

Masurewicz comes to check on Walter, telling him that his soul is in peril. Masurewicz reveals that he had killed children because of the witch, and though he tried to turn himself in, no one believed him. Masurewicz hands the crucifix over to Walter and leaves. Walter breaks through the wall in his attic room where the witch and rodent came through and finds the skeletons of past sacrifices. The rodent's voice can be heard repeating "she's coming for you." Walter then finds the sacrifice chamber, with Danny crying in a cage. The cloaked witch places a silver dagger into Walter's hand and commands him to kill Danny. Walter tries to resist and manages to redirect his strike towards the witch instead of Danny. This leads to a struggle where she steals the knife, but Walter is able to gouge her eyes out with his hands, and then strangle her with the crucifix.

He takes Danny and escapes the attic, crash landing back in his room. Danny's cries resume, and Walter sees that the rat is chewing through Danny's neck. Frances, locked out, desperately shrieks for Walter to let her in while neon lights shine under the door. Masurewicz is in his room, praying and beating his head so hard that he is bleeding. The manager and the police arrive and the former opens the door with his service keys to find Walter covered in blood, holding Danny's corpse. Walter is taken to a psych ward and diagnosed with paranoid schizophrenia.

The police recover the infant remains, some dating back 300 years, the knife, and unknown DNA from the bite wounds on Danny's neck. Masurewicz hangs himself. Some time afterwards, neon lights appear in Walter's ward accompanied by shrieks of agony, prompting a nurse to come to Walter's aid. He is again covered in blood and when the nurse lifts his shirt, the rat leaps out of his stomach, killing him. The episode ends the same way it began, with a sign in front of the "witch-house" reading "Room for Rent."

== Cast ==
- Ezra Godden as Walter Gilman
- Jay Brazeau as Mr. Dombrowski
- Campbell Lane as Masurewicz
- Chelah Horsdal as Frances Elwood

== Home media ==
The DVD was released by Anchor Bay Entertainment on March 28, 2006. The episode was the second episode as well as the second to be released on DVD. The episode appears on the first volume of the Blu-ray compilation of the series.

== Similarities to the source material ==
The television adaptation significantly truncates the plot of Lovecraft's 1933 short story. It also sets the story in contemporary times, updating small details while remaining relatively faithful to the original plot. For example, whereas in the Lovecraft story the protagonist is a student of quantum mechanics, in the television adaption he studies string theory. The TV adaptation features the rat-like creature with a human face, Brown Jenkin, from Lovecraft's original tale, and also the witch Keziah Mason. In a nod to Lovecraft's original inspiration for Miskatonic University, the protagonist of the television adaptation wears a Miskatonic University T-shirt featuring a design based on the seal of Brown University.

== Reception ==
The Mammoth Book of Best New Horror called "H. P. Lovecraft's Dreams in the Witch-House" "one of the standout episodes" of the Masters of Horror series.
