= Space Truckers =

- Spanish language theatrical release poster
- Directed by: Stuart Gordon
- Screenplay by: Ted Mann
- Story by: Ted Mann; Stuart Gordon
- Produced by: Peter Newman; Greg Johnson; Stuart Gordon; Ted Mann; Mary Breen-Farrelly
- Starring: Dennis Hopper; Stephen Dorff; Debi Mazar; Charles Dance
- Cinematography: Mac Ahlberg
- Edited by: John Victor-Smith
- Music by: Colin Towns
- Production company: Goldcrest Films
- Distributed by: Entertainment Film Distributors (United Kingdom)
- Release date: 1996
- Running time: 95 minutes
- Countries: United Kingdom; United States; Ireland
- Language: English
- Budget: $17-25 million
- Box office: $1,614,266

Space Truckers is a 1996 science fiction comedy film directed by Stuart Gordon and starring Dennis Hopper, Stephen Dorff, Debi Mazar and Charles Dance. It was filmed at Ardmore Studios, County Wicklow, Ireland.

The story concerns John Canyon, one of the last independent space transport entrepreneurs. Bad times have forced him to carry suspicious cargo to Earth without asking questions. During the flight, the cargo turns out to be a multitude of virtually unstoppable killer robots.

== Plot ==
At a corporation's base on the Neptunian moon Triton, mercenaries are setting up a defense perimeter to try to hold off an unstoppable cyborg warrior. The company's CEO E.J. Saggs and chief scientist Dr. Nabel seal themselves inside the control room. The cyborg destroys the soldiers' tank and then attacks a helicopter, which crashes into the control room. The soldiers are killed one by one, until Nabel finally deactivates the cyborg with a remote control. The remaining corporate employees discover that the cyborg was created by Nabel for the company. Saggs takes the remote and reactivates the cyborg, ordering it to kill Nabel.

Meanwhile, John Canyon, one of the last independent "space truckers", drops off his cargo of square pigs at a "truck stop" space station, but becomes embroiled in a brawl with the trucking company head, Keller, who is sucked out into space. He and his two passengers—Cindy, a waitress who has promised to marry him in exchange for a ride to Earth to see her mother, and Mike, an up-and-coming trucker working for the company—take on a deal to transport alleged sex dolls to Earth. Chased by police investigating Keller's death, John takes his rig into the "scum cluster", a region controlled by pirates. The rig takes damage, leaving them adrift; they are soon captured by the pirate ship Regalia, commanded by the company-hating Captain Macanudo. Cindy agrees to have sex with him if he would take the cargo and let them go.

The captain is revealed to be Nabel, who rebuilt his grievously injured body and went into piracy as revenge against Saggs for betraying him. The cargo that John's rig is carrying is in fact a full supply of the cyborg warriors Nabel designed and built for Saggs's company. One of the cyborgs activates, kills most of the crew, and severely damages the ship. John, Cindy and Mike take their rig and escape as the Regalia explodes. As they make their way back to Earth, John and Mike find a mortally wounded Macanudo in the hold, who reveals the true nature of the cargo to them. John releases Cindy from any obligation of marrying him, and tells her and Mike to take the escape pod while he releases the cargo in the atmosphere, where it will burn up on re-entry. Cindy and Mike land safely, but the rig is unable to return to space and explodes in the sky; however, John is able to safely escape before the explosion.

John, Cindy and Mike go to the hospital to see Cindy's mother, who became sick twenty years earlier and was frozen until a cure was found; John is smitten with her at first sight. Meanwhile, Saggs—now President of Earth after the government was privatized—visits John, Cindy and Mike in the hospital, where he offers John a new rig and gives the trio a suitcase full of money to keep them quiet about his cyborg invasion plan. John tactfully agrees to the deal, convinced they will all be assassinated if they don't accept, but Mike angrily throws the suitcase out the window. Below, Saggs re-enters his presidential limousine; having planted a bomb in the suitcase, he triggers the detonator just as the suitcase lands on his limousine's roof, killing him. With Saggs dead and Earth safe, but also having inadvertently blown up the president, Mike, Cindy, John and Cindy's mother quietly escape to the spaceport and blast off in their brand new rig.

== Cast ==
- Dennis Hopper as John Canyon
- Debi Mazar as Cindy
- Stephen Dorff as Mike Pucci
- Charles Dance as Dr. Nabel / Captain Macanudo
- George Wendt as Keller
- Vernon Wells as Mr. Cutt
- Barbara Crampton as Carol
- Shane Rimmer as Commander E.J. Saggs
- Olwen Fouéré as Building Commander
- Pat Laffan as "Scummy"
- Birdy Sweeney as "Mr. Zesty"
- Sandra Dickinson as Betty "Bitchin' Betty"
- Graeme Wilkinson as Jackie
- Sean Lawlor as Mel
- Carolyn Purdy-Gordon as Delia

== Production ==
Stuart Gordon had always wanted to direct a space movie that followed the rules of actually being in space citing how it always bothered him in Star Wars the characters moved the same on planets as they did on spaceships. Gordon collaborated with writer Ted Mann on outlining the story with Mann writing the actual script. The film was inspired by writers Stuart Gordon and Ted Mann's boyhood love of space exploration as well as exploring how little would ultimately change with colonization of other planets with mankind encountering "the same old corporate greed, graft and corruption everyone thought they left behind on earth...". In contrast to the minimalist sterile environments depicted in 2001: A Space Odyssey, Gordon opted to make the film colorful and commercialized.

=== Casting ===
In casting the role of John Canyon, Gordon selected Dennis Hopper for the role as he felt he was capable of conveying a hardscrabble "veteran of life" with Hopper interested in the role as he welcomed the opportunity to play a sympathetic character after a slew of villain roles. Gordon credited Hopper for his professionalism and also cited his role in getting Stephen Dorff cast. When Gordon and Mann were trying to flesh out the character of Cindy to make the character less bland, the two brought up their admiration for Debi Mazar as an actress with Mann who'd worked with her on the television series Civil Wars instrumental in getting her cast in the role. Ron Houser was initially cast as Captain Macanudo, but after feeling his performance was too over the top, Gordon sought a new actor for the role. Gordon happened to be staying at the same hotel as Charles Dance in London which led to the two encountering each other in the lobby and Gordon telling Dance about the film in passing. Dance asked to see the script and after a week called back saying he wanted to play Captain Macanudo saying he took the role "for the sheer fun of it." Calling it one of the most entertaining scripts he'd been offered in years and relishing the opportunity to play inherently silly material completely straight.

=== Filming ===
After casting had been secured, the crew arrived in Ireland only to find that the local producer who had promised £7 million had only secured £2 million. Gordon credits producers Peter Newman and Greg Johnson with saving the film as they managed to secure additional funding from several other producers and even the Irish government helped out with the film having been made under Section 35 of the Finance Act of 1987 where the government would put up part of the production budget on the condition Irish labor and resources are utilized. Additional funding came in from Goldcrest Films on the condition of the post-production work being done in London.

While the film was shot in Ireland to exploit tax breaks and local resources, there were no special effects facilities in Ireland to produce the elaborate effects work needed for the production. The 22,000 acre premises of a disused builders' merchant on the Sandyford industrial estate, located outside Dublin, had to be taken over and converted into a vast special effects facility headed by visual effects supervisors Brian Johnson and Paul Gentry, who needed to hire scores of model makers, plasterers, carpenters, motion-control camera operators and others as well as supply them with the needed resources. To convey the sensation of weightlessness, Koichi Sakamoto was hired to train the actors.

The film was also involved in a defamation suit between Dennis Hopper and Rip Torn where Hopper publicly stated Torn pulled a knife on him on the set of Easy Rider back in the 1960s. Hopper's representatives tried to settle the defamation suit by floating the offer of a supporting role in Space Truckers, which Torn's representatives refused.

== Release ==
Space Truckers was given a straight-to-video release in the United States on April 27, 1999.

== Reception ==
Space Truckers was poorly received by critics, with the review aggregator Rotten Tomatoes rating the film at 17%, based on 12 reviews. It was also a box office bomb, earning less than $2 million against a $25+ million budget, partly due to the fact that despite festival play, it never received a United States theatrical release, instead being solicited directly to cable television and home video.
