= Bleacher Bums =

1977 play about Chicago Cubs fans

- Written by: Roberta Custer; Richard Fire; Dennis Franz; Stuart Gordon; Joe Mantegna; Josephine Paoletti; Dennis Paoli; Carolyn Purdy-Gordon; Michael Saad; Ian Patrick Williams; Keith Szarabajka
- Original language: English
- Genre: Drama
- Setting: Wrigley Field

Premiere
- Date premiered: 1977
- Place premiered: Organic Theater Company, Chicago, Illinois

Bleacher Bums is a 1977 play written collaboratively by members of Chicago's Organic Theater Company, from an idea by actor Joe Mantegna. Its original Chicago production was directed by Stuart Gordon. A 1979 performance of the play was taped for PBS television, and in 2002 a made-for-TV movie adaptation was produced.

== Plot ==
External videos
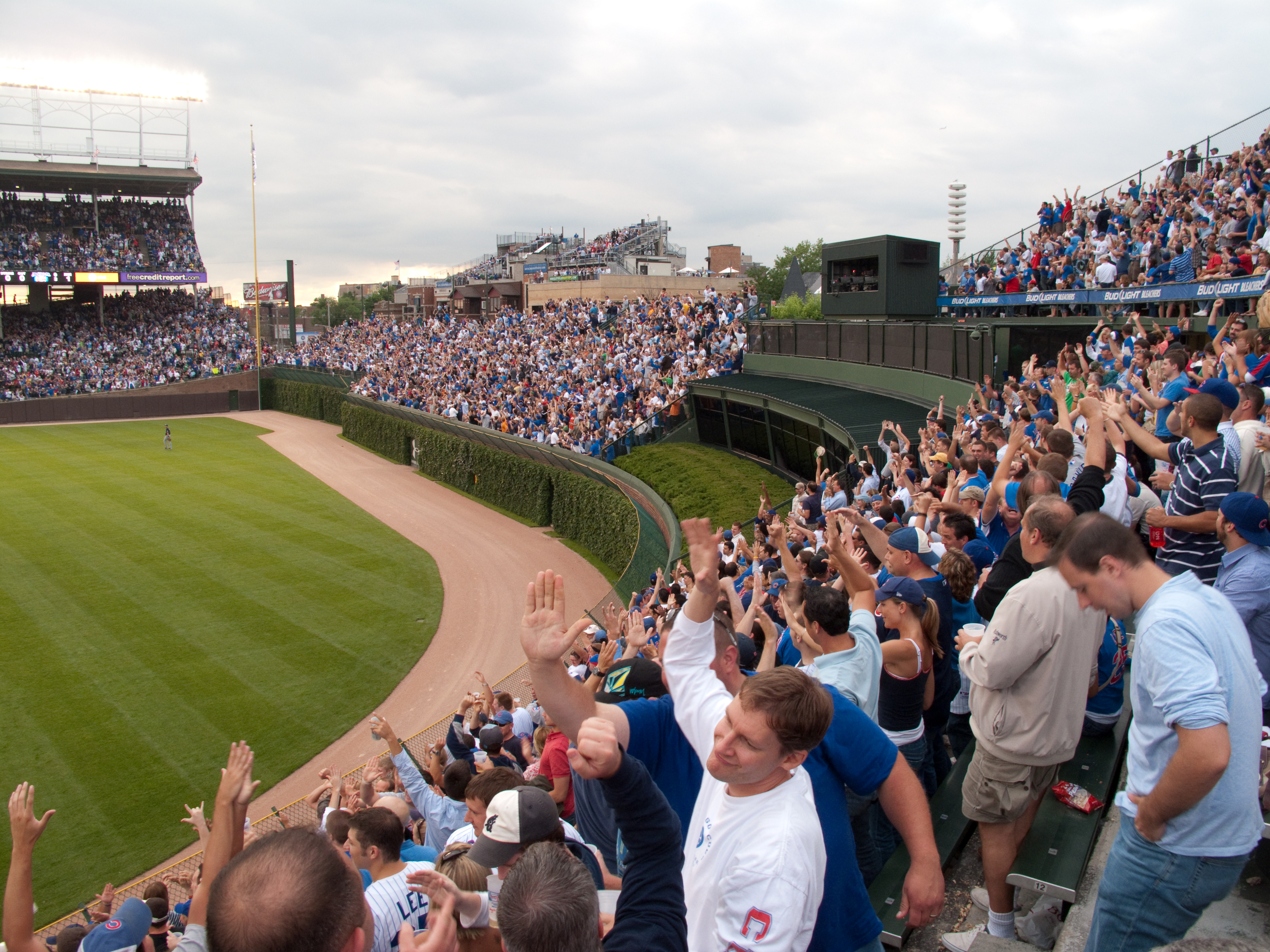
- Bleacher Bums (Part 1, 1984), WTTW - Channel 11, Play with Dennis Franz and Joe Mantegna

Bleacher Bums takes place in the bleachers of Chicago's Wrigley Field. The characters are a bunch of Chicago Cubs fans, watching a game in progress on a summer afternoon. Most of them have been gathering here for some time and know each other; even if they might not necessarily like or tolerate each other. Beer is being drunk, hot dogs are being eaten, and friendly wagers start to take on increasing importance.

== Touring ==
Bleacher Bums was put on in different cities across the United States. In 1981, longtime Cubs fan Jerry Pritikin, the Bleacher Preacher, was hired as a paid consultant for a production in San Francisco, instructing the cast there on Chicago fan vernacular, and proper fan behavior.

== Cast ==
Joe Mantegna and Dennis Franz starred in the original production, a performance of which was filmed for PBS broadcast in 1979, directed by Stuart Gordon. Other cast members over the years have included Dennis Farina, Gary Sandy, Gary Houston and George Wendt.

== Television film ==
A 2001 TV movie version for cable television was directed by Saul Rubinek and starred Brad Garrett, Wayne Knight, Matt Craven, Peter Riegert and Hal Sparks. Due to licensing issues with Major League Baseball, the name of the team was changed from the Chicago Cubs to the Chicago Bruins, the St. Louis Cardinals became the St. Louis Eagles, and Wrigley Field was renamed, but references to former Cubs players (Cap Anson, Mordecai Brown, Joe Tinker, Johnny Evers, and Frank Chance) and to the Cubs' World series record remain.

== See also ==
- List of baseball films
