= Masters of Horror =

Horror anthology television series

- The poster of Masters of Horror
- Genre: Horror; Thriller
- Created by: Mick Garris
- Countries of origin: United States; Canada
- No. of seasons: 2
- No. of episodes: 26

Production
- Executive producers: Mick Garris, Andrew Deane, Keith Addis
- Producers: Adam Goldworm, Ben Browning
- Running time: 60 minutes
- Production companies: Industry Entertainment; Nice Guy Productions; Reunion Pictures; Starz Productions; Showtime Networks

Original release
- Network: Showtime
- Release: October 28, 2005 – February 2, 2007

Masters of Horror is a horror anthology television series created by director Mick Garris that aired on Showtime from October 28, 2005 to February 2, 2007.

== Origin ==
In 2002, director Mick Garris invited some director friends to an informal dinner at a restaurant in Sherman Oaks, California. The original ten "masters" attending were John Carpenter, Larry Cohen, Don Coscarelli, Joe Dante, Guillermo del Toro, Stuart Gordon, Tobe Hooper, John Landis, William Malone, and Garris himself. Subsequently, Garris organized regular dinners with the group and invited other horror and other genre directors to attend, including Dario Argento, Eli Roth, Wes Craven, David Cronenberg, Tim Sullivan, Rob Zombie, Bryan Singer, Fred Dekker, William Lustig, Lucky McKee, Ernest Dickerson, Katt Shea, Quentin Tarantino, Robert Rodriguez, James Gunn, Mary Lambert, Tom Holland, Peter Medak, Ti West, Lloyd Kaufman, and others.

In 2005, Garris created and produced an original anthology television series of one-hour movies, written and directed by many of the "masters," which was originally broadcast in the United States on the Showtime cable network. In several international territories, the films were released theatrically.

The series debuted to excellent reviews in the U.S. on October 28, 2005, with the premiere episode "Incident On and Off a Mountain Road," co-written and directed by Don Coscarelli, based on the short story by Joe R. Lansdale. New episodes premiered every Friday at 10 p.m. EST throughout the series' two seasons. The show followed an anthology series format, with each episode featuring a one-hour film directed by a well-known horror film director. In 2009, Chiller began airing the show on their Sunday evening line-up of shows, and in 2010, Reelz Channel began airing episodes of Masters of Horror edited (despite keeping its TV-MA rating) and with commercials.

== Series overview ==
Season	Episodes	Originally released	
Season	Episodes	First released	Last released
1	13	October 28, 2005	February 25, 2006
2	13	October 27, 2006	February 2, 2007

== Episodes ==
=== Season 1 (2005–06) ===
No. overall	No. in season	Title	Directed by	Written by	Original release date
1	1	"Incident On and Off a Mountain Road"	Don Coscarelli	Short story by : Joe R. Lansdale; Teleplay by : Don Coscarelli & Stephen Romano	October 28, 2005
A young woman matches wits with a deformed and sadistic serial killer on and off a remote mountain road. Based on the short story by Joe R. Lansdale.
2	2	"H. P. Lovecraft's Dreams in the Witch-House"	Stuart Gordon	Short story by : H. P. Lovecraft; Teleplay by : Dennis Paoli & Stuart Gordon	November 4, 2005
A college student renting an old room in a boarding house discovers a plot by sinister, otherworldly forces to sacrifice his neighbour's infant. Based on the short story by H. P. Lovecraft.
3	3	"Dance of the Dead"	Tobe Hooper	Short story by : Richard Matheson; Teleplay by : Richard Christian Matheson	November 11, 2005
A teenage girl living in a post-apocalyptic village befriends a group of rough punks who hang out at a sinister bar where reanimated corpses dance on stage.
4	4	"Jenifer"	Dario Argento	Short story by : Bruce Jones; Teleplay by : Steven Weber	November 18, 2005
A police officer saves the life of a hideously deformed young woman, only to find himself drawn into a web of murder and self-destruction from which he finds it difficult to break away.
5	5	"Chocolate"	Mick Garris	Short story by : Mick Garris; Teleplay by : Mick Garris	November 25, 2005
A recently divorced young man begins experiencing the world through the senses of a woman he's never met after eating a sample of chocolate. But his quest to meet her face-to-face leads to drastic consequences.
6	6	"Homecoming"	Joe Dante	Short story by : Dale Bailey; Teleplay by : Sam Hamm	December 2, 2005
A political satire in which the reanimated corpses of American soldiers killed in Iraq return in an attempt to sway the U.S. presidential election.
7	7	"Deer Woman"	John Landis	Max Landis & John Landis	December 9, 2005
In this horror comedy, a police detective investigates a series of brutal murders which are committed by an ancient creature from Native American mythology.
8	8	"Cigarette Burns"	John Carpenter	Drew McWeeny & Scott Swan	December 16, 2005
A man searches for the last surviving print of a rare film which allegedly drove the only audience that ever viewed it into a fit of homicidal frenzy.
9	9	"Fair-Haired Child"	William Malone	Matt Greenberg	January 6, 2006
A teenage outcast is kidnapped by a strange couple and locked in a basement with their son, who has a dark secret.
10	10	"Sick Girl"	Lucky McKee	Story by : Sean Hood; Teleplay by : Sean Hood and Lucky McKee	January 13, 2006
A horror comedy in which a lesbian entomologist starts a relationship with another woman, but then also finds herself involved with a rather predatory and aggressive insect.
11	11	"Pick Me Up"	Larry Cohen	Short story by : David J. Schow; Teleplay by : David J. Schow	January 20, 2006
Two serial killers (one who kills hitchhikers, another who kills anyone who gives him a ride) clash over their latest victim.
12	12	"Haeckel's Tale"	John McNaughton	Short story by : Clive Barker; Teleplay by : Mick Garris	January 27, 2006
In the 1850s, a man on his way to his sick father in Upstate New York, seeks shelter in a secluded cabin owned by a mysterious couple where he becomes involved in a grotesque orgy of the undead.
13	13	"Imprint"	Takashi Miike	Teleplay by : Daisuke Tengan; Novel "Bokkê, kyôtê" by : Shimako Iwai	February 25, 2006
A 19th-century American tourist in Japan gets much more than he bargained for while searching for a Japanese prostitute he fell in love with years earlier.

Episode 4, "Jenifer", was accidentally made available on-demand to a select audience at the same time as episode 2, "H. P. Lovecraft's Dreams in the Witch-House". The episode was cut for graphic violence during its initial television broadcast, and the cut scenes can only be viewed in a featurette separate from the film on the R1 DVD release.

Episode 13, "Imprint", originally scheduled to premiere on January 27, 2006, was shelved by Showtime due to concerns over its content. Mick Garris, creator and executive producer of the series, characterized the episode as "the most disturbing film I've ever seen". It is available only on DVD and Blu-ray by Anchor Bay Entertainment, along with the rest of the episodes in the first season. "Imprint" was shown in the UK on Bravo (7 April 2006).

=== Season 2 (2006–07) ===
No. overall	No. in season	Title	Directed by	Written by	Original release date
14	1	"The Damned Thing"	Tobe Hooper	Short story by : Ambrose Bierce; Teleplay by : Richard Christian Matheson	October 27, 2006
The apocalyptic tale of a monstrous, unseen force that devastates Sheriff Kevin Reddle's family and terrorizes their small Texas community. Based on the short story of the same title by Ambrose Bierce.
15	2	"Family"	John Landis	Brent Hanley	November 3, 2006
A young married couple moves into a new home and meet their seemingly venerable neighbor Harold. Harold is in fact a psychotic serial killer who has created a family using the skeletons of his former victims, whom he has kidnapped and murdered throughout the years.
16	3	"The V Word"	Ernest Dickerson	Mick Garris	November 10, 2006
This vampire film reveals the punishment visited upon two teenage boys who make the very poor decision to break into a mortuary and encounter a real vampire.
17	4	"Sounds Like"	Brad Anderson	Short story by : Mike O'Driscoll; Teleplay by : Brad Anderson	November 17, 2006
The story of Larry Pearce, an ordinary man blessed with the gift/curse of extraordinary hearing that drives him to the brink of insanity, and forces him to take violent action to silence the horrific cacophony in his head.
18	5	"Pro-Life"	John Carpenter	Drew McWeeny and Scott Swan	November 24, 2006
Pro-Life tells the story of a young pregnant girl trapped inside an abortion clinic by her murderous family, who soon discovers the only thing more dangerous than her pursuers is the demonic secret that she carries within her.
19	6	"Pelts"	Dario Argento	Short story by : F. Paul Wilson; Teleplay by : Matt Venne	December 1, 2006
Fur trader Jake Feldman knows that you cannot make a coat without breaking a few animals' necks. In his pursuit to make the perfect fur coat to win over a woman, Feldman steals supernatural raccoon pelts that violently turn against those that covet them.
20	7	"The Screwfly Solution"	Joe Dante	Short story by : James Tiptree, Jr. Teleplay by : Sam Hamm	December 8, 2006
A nightmarish plague spreads across the globe, transforming men into killers who attack every woman that crosses their paths.
21	8	"Valerie on the Stairs"	Mick Garris	Short story by : Clive Barker; Teleplay by : Mick Garris	December 29, 2006
A novelist rents a room in a flophouse to write a novel and discovers there are fates worse than literary anonymity when he encounters a mysterious woman and a stalking demon spawned from the imagination of three tenants.
22	9	"Right to Die"	Rob Schmidt	John Esposito	January 5, 2007
After walking away from an auto accident that leaves his wife in a coma and on life support, a man must decide to let his wife die. But the situation becomes more nightmarish when her vengeful spirit threatens to expose a dirty secret of his own.
23	10	"We All Scream for Ice Cream"	Tom Holland	Short story by : John Farris; Teleplay by : David J. Schow	January 12, 2007
In the 1950s, an ice cream man in clown makeup is accidentally killed during a childhood prank gone wrong. Now, years later after the kids have grown up, his ghost returns for revenge.
24	11	"The Black Cat"	Stuart Gordon	Short story by : Edgar Allan Poe; Teleplay by : Dennis Paoli & Stuart Gordon	January 19, 2007
In 1841 Philadelphia, Edgar Allan Poe, suffering from writer's block and short on cash, is tormented by his wife's black cat that will either destroy his life or inspire him to write one of his most famous stories.
25	12	"The Washingtonians"	Peter Medak	Short story by : Bentley Little; Teleplay by : Richard Chizmar & Johnathon Schaech	January 26, 2007
A man finds his family in danger after he discovers a shocking secret about the United States of America's founding fathers, in which a secret society is hell-bent on keeping a secret at any cost.
26	13	"Dream Cruise"	Norio Tsuruta	Short story by : Kôji Suzuki; Teleplay by : Naoya Takayama & Norio Tsuruta	February 2, 2007
Jack, an American lawyer working in Tokyo, has fallen in love with the wife of his most valued client, Eiji. Despite Jack's deep-rooted fear of the sea, he reluctantly accepts Eiji's invitation to join the couple for a day trip on the Tokyo Bay. Pleasure slowly turns to terror as they discover the watery destiny in store for each of them.

== Related series ==
=== Fear Itself ===
Series creator Mick Garris stated that Showtime opted not to renew the third season and that film studio Lionsgate had begun funding the series. On September 25, 2007, The Hollywood Reporter announced that Mick Garris and Lionsgate signed a 13-episode deal with NBC. Instead of a third season of the show, a new show called Fear Itself was created with the same premise as Masters of Horror. It premiered on NBC in June 2008.

== Soundtrack ==
A two-disc soundtrack was released for the series in October 2005 on Immortal Records. The album features heavy metal and hard rock acts with a few acoustic pieces. A second volume was released a year later.

== Comic adaptations ==
IDW Publishing produced a series of comic book adaptations of several episodes from the series. The first four issues are two-parters, adapting "Incident On and Off a Mountain Road", based on the short story by Joe R. Lansdale, and "Dreams in the Witch-House". The first two comic covers were painted by the award-winning artist Jeremy Caniglia.

== Awards and nominations ==
Year	Award	Result	Category	Recipient	Notes
2006	Saturn Award	Won	Best Television Presentation		Tied with The Triangle
2007	Saturn Award	Nominated	Best Television Presentation		
2007	Saturn Award	Won	Best Television DVD Release		
2006	Emmy Award	Nominated	Outstanding Music Composition for a Series	Richard Band	Episode: "H. P. Lovecraft's Dreams in the Witch-House"
2006	Emmy Award	Won	Outstanding Original Main Title Theme Music	Edward Shearmur	
2007	Satellite Award	Won	Best DVD Extras (Season 1)		Tied with Borat
