= Re-Animator =

1985 film by Stuart Gordon

- Theatrical release poster
- Directed by: Stuart Gordon
- Screenplay by: Dennis Paoli; William J. Norris; Stuart Gordon
- Based on: "Herbert West–Reanimator" by H. P. Lovecraft
- Produced by: Brian Yuzna
- Starring: Bruce Abbott; Barbara Crampton; David Gale; Robert Sampson; Jeffrey Combs
- Cinematography: Mac Ahlberg
- Edited by: Lee Percy
- Music by: Richard Band
- Production company: Re-Animator Productions
- Distributed by: Empire International Pictures
- Release date: October 18, 1985
- Running time: 86 minutes
- Country: United States
- Languages: English; German
- Budget: $900,000-1.3 million
- Box office: $2 million

Re-Animator (also known as H. P. Lovecraft's Re-Animator) is a 1985 American science fiction comedy horror film loosely based on the 1922 H. P. Lovecraft serial novelette "Herbert West–Reanimator". Directed by Stuart Gordon and produced by Brian Yuzna, the film stars Jeffrey Combs as Herbert West, a medical student who has invented a reagent which can re-animate deceased bodies. He and his classmate Dan Cain (Bruce Abbott) begin to test the serum on dead human bodies, and conflict with Dr. Carl Hill (David Gale), who is infatuated with Cain's fiancée (Barbara Crampton) and wants to claim the invention as his own.

Originally devised by Gordon as a theatrical stage production and later a half-hour television pilot, the television script was revised to become a feature film. Filmed in Hollywood, the film originally was released without a rating from the Motion Picture Association of America, and was later edited to obtain an R rating. It garnered its largest audience through the unrated cut's release on home video.

Re-Animator is the first film collaboration between Gordon, Combs and Crampton, the second being From Beyond, released in 1986. It is the first film in the Re-Animator film series, followed by Bride of Re-Animator in 1990 and Beyond Re-Animator in 2003. Released to mostly positive reviews, Re-Animator has since been considered a cult film, and been reappraised as a classic example of the zombie genre.

== Plot ==
At the University of Zurich Institute of Medicine in Switzerland, Herbert West brings his dead professor, Dr. Hans Gruber, back to life, to horrific side-effects. West explains that the dosage was too large. When accused of killing Gruber, West counters: "I gave him life!"

West arrives at Miskatonic University in Arkham, Massachusetts, in order to further his studies as a medical student. He rents a room from fellow medical student Daniel "Dan" Cain and converts the house's basement into his own personal laboratory. West demonstrates his reanimating reagent to Dan by reanimating Dan's dead cat Rufus. The cat behaves viciously that night, forcing Dan to kill it before West reanimates what is left of it, convincing Dan that his reagent works. Dan's fiancée Megan Halsey, daughter of the medical school's dean, walks in on this experiment and is horrified.

Dan tries to tell the dean about West's success in reanimating the dead cat, but the dean does not believe him. When Dan insists, the dean implies that Dan and West have gone mad. Barred from the school, West and Dan sneak into the morgue to test the reagent on a human subject in an attempt to prove that it works, and thereby salvage their medical careers. The corpse they inject comes back to life but in a frenetic and violent zombie-like state. Dr. Halsey stumbles upon the scene and is killed by the reanimated corpse, which West then kills with a bone-saw. Excited at the prospect of working with a freshly dead specimen, West injects Dr. Halsey's body with his reanimating reagent. Dr. Halsey returns to life, also in a zombie-like state. Megan chances upon the scene, and is hysterical. Dan collapses in shock.

Dr. Halsey's colleague Dr. Carl Hill, a professor and researcher at the hospital, takes charge of Dr. Halsey by putting him in a padded observation. He carries out a laser lobotomy on him and discovers that Dr. Halsey is not sick, but dead and reanimated.

Dr. Hill goes to West's basement lab and attempts to blackmail him into surrendering his reagent and notes, hoping to take credit for West's discovery. West offers to demonstrate the reagent and puts a few drops of it onto a microscope slide with dead cat tissue. As Dr. Hill peers through the microscope at this slide, West bludgeons him from behind with a shovel, then decapitates him with it. West reanimates Dr. Hill's head and body separately. While West is questioning Dr. Hill's head and taking notes, Dr. Hill's body sneaks up behind him and knocks him unconscious. The body carries the head back to Dr. Hill's office, with West's reagent and notes.

In his re-animated state, Dr. Hill reveals laser lobotomies grant him the ability to control other re-animated corpses telepathically. He directs Dr. Halsey to snatch Megan away from Dan. While being carried to the morgue by her reanimated father, Megan faints. When she arrives, Dr. Hill strips her naked and straps her unconscious body to a table. She regains consciousness as Hill's body and bloody, severed head begin to sexually assault her.

Hill's body starts to place his head between Megan's legs, but is interrupted by the arrival of West and Dan. West distracts Dr. Hill while Dan frees Megan. Dr. Hill reveals that he has reanimated and lobotomized several corpses from the morgue, rendering them susceptible to mind control as Halsey is. However, Megan's voice reawakens a protectiveness in her father, who fights off the other corpses as Dan and Megan escape. In the ensuing chaos, West injects Dr. Hill's body with a lethal overdose of the reagent. Dr. Hill's body mutates rapidly and attacks West, who screams out to Dan to save his work before being pulled away by Dr. Hill's monstrous entrails.

Dan retrieves the satchel containing West's reagent and notes. As Dan and Megan flee the morgue, one of the reanimated corpses attacks and strangles Megan. Dan takes her to the hospital emergency room and tries to revive her, but she is dead. In despair, he injects her with West's reagent. The scene fades to black and Megan is heard screaming.

== Cast ==
- Jeffrey Combs as Herbert West
- Bruce Abbott as Daniel Cain
- Barbara Crampton as Megan Halsey
- David Gale as Dr. Carl Hill
- Robert Sampson as Dean Alan Halsey
- Al Berry as Dr. Hans Gruber
- Carolyn Purdy-Gordon as Dr. Harrod
- Ian Patrick Williams as the Swiss Professor
- Gerry Black as Mace
- Peter Kent as Melvin the Re-Animated
- Craig Reed as the One Arm Man Corpse / the Burn Victim

== Production ==
The idea to make Re-Animator came from a discussion Stuart Gordon had with friends one night about vampire films. He felt that there were too many Dracula films and expressed a desire to see a Frankenstein film. Someone asked if he had read "Herbert West–Reanimator" by H. P. Lovecraft. Gordon had read most of the author's works, but not that story, which was long out of print. He went to the Chicago Public Library and read their copy.

Originally, Gordon was going to adapt Lovecraft's story for the stage, but eventually decided along with writers Dennis Paoli and William Norris to make it as a half-hour television pilot. The story was set around the turn of the century, and they soon realized that it would be too expensive to recreate. They updated it to the present day in Chicago with the intention of using actors from the Organic Theater company. They were told that the half hour format was not saleable and so they made it an hour, writing 13 episodes. Special effects technician Bob Greenberg, who had worked on John Carpenter's Dark Star, repeatedly told Gordon that the only market for horror was in feature films, and introduced him to producer Brian Yuzna. Gordon showed Yuzna the script for the pilot and the 12 additional episodes. The producer liked what he read and convinced Gordon to shoot the film in Hollywood, because of all the special effects involved. Yuzna made a distribution deal with Charles Band's Empire Pictures in return for post-production services. However, after viewing the initial dailies Empire became involved in the actual production, making a number of suggestions, including the recruitment of Mac Ahlberg as cinematographer.

According to Paoli, the first draft of the script contained no humor whatsoever, and the film's comedic elements only came out over further revisions and during the actual production.

Yuzna described the film as having the "sort of shock sensibility of an Evil Dead with the production values of, hopefully, The Howling." Gordon cited The Revenge of Frankenstein as a major inspiration for the film. John Naulin worked on the film's gruesome makeup effects, using what he described as "disgusting shots brought out from the Cook County morgue of all kinds of different lividities and different corpses." The morgue set was based on the aforementioned Cook County morgue, which was newly built and featured cutting-edge technology; Gordon opted for this look since he felt old morgues had been overdone in horror films. Naulin and Gordon also used a book of forensic pathology in order to present how a corpse looks once the blood settles in the body, creating a variety of odd skin tones. Naulin said that Re-Animator was the bloodiest film he had ever worked on: in the past, he had never used more than a couple of gallons (7.6 liters) of blood on a film, but on Re-Animator he used twelve times as much.

Jeffrey Combs was cast as Herbert West. Combs had never read any H. P. Lovecraft before his casting and was taken aback by the script; he later said he only took the role because he needed the work and assumed the film would never reach a large audience.

Principal photography began on November 28, 1984, with a six-week shooting schedule, though Gordon has boasted that they finished shooting the film in just four weeks. The biggest makeup challenge in the film was the headless Dr. Hill zombie. Tony Doublin designed the mechanical effects and was faced with the problem of proportion once the 9–10 inches of the head were removed from the body. Each scene forced him to use a different technique. For example, one technique involved building an upper torso that actor David Gale could bend over and stick his head through so that it appeared to be the one that the walking corpse was carrying around.

The "reanimating agent" itself was the chemiluminescent agent luminol.

== Soundtrack ==
The score for the film was composed by Richard Band, and has been noted for its similarities to Bernard Herrmann's score for Alfred Hitchcock's 1960 film Psycho. The score took about three and a half weeks to complete, and was recorded in Italy with the Rome Philharmonic. In regards to the influence of Herrmann's Psycho score, Band has noted that the similarities were intentional, and that he "used that as a base and modified the theme but kept that Herrmannesque feeling."

The film soundtrack was released by Waxwork Records on vinyl and includes liner notes by composer Richard Band and director Stuart Gordon, with album artwork by Gary Pullin.

== Release ==
Re-Animator was released on October 18, 1985, in 129 theaters, and grossed $543,728 during its opening weekend. It went on to make $2,023,414 in North America, above its estimated $900,000 budget. However, it experienced its greatest commercial success when released on home video. The film was re-released with a premiere on May 21, 2010, as part of Creation Entertainment's Weekends of Horror.

=== Home video ===
The film was originally released on VHS, LaserDisc and Betamax by Vestron Video, and was later released on DVD by Elite Entertainment on April 30, 2002 in two versions: a standard DVD edition, and a "Millennium Edition" featuring a remastered picture and two commentary tracks, one by writer/director Stuart Gordon and the other by the entire main cast except for David Gale, who died in 1991. This THX certified two-disc DVD release also comes with Dolby Digital 5.1 standard and isolated musical score audio tracks, a 2.0 mono audio track and a DTS 5.1 audio track.

=== R-rated version ===
When Re-Animator was originally released in theaters, the filmmakers did not submit it for rating by the Motion Picture Association of America (MPAA), for fear that it would receive an X rating. However, this presented advertising restrictions, since many media outlets had policies against promoting unrated films. In early 1986, the filmmakers submitted a re-edited version of Re-Animator to the MPAA, which received an R rating. In the US, the vast majority of home media releases of the film used the unrated version.

The R-rated version runs 95 minutes and has much of the gore edited out and replaced with various scenes which had been deleted for pacing purposes, including a subplot involving Dr. Hill hypnotizing several of the characters to make them more suggestible to his will (in this version, Dean Halsey is hypnotized early on to turn him against West, and then later is hypnotized again after he has been re-animated; in the theatrical film, the re-animated Halsey's submission is merely a result of the lobotomy). In addition, a short scene was added showing Herbert West injecting himself with small amounts of the reagent to stay awake and energized; this may have affected his thinking over the course of the film.

The unrated version is often labeled as a "director's cut", which strictly speaking is false: director Stuart Gordon was not allowed to determine the final cut on any version of the film. However, Gordon has expressed his preference for the unrated version over the R-rated version.

=== Integral cut ===
A 2013 German Blu-ray release of Re-Animator also included a new "Integral cut", wherein the extra material from the R-rated version was incorporated into the unrated version, expanding the film from 86 minutes to just under 105 minutes. This extended cut has also been included with other non-US releases.

== Reception ==
The film was well received by critics, earning mostly positive reviews. Pauline Kael enjoyed the film's "indigenous American junkiness" and called it "pop Buñuel; the jokes hit you in a subterranean comic zone that the surrealists' pranks sometimes reached, but without the surrealists' self-consciousness (and art-consciousness)." Roger Ebert gave the film three out of four stars and wrote, "I walked out somewhat surprised and reinvigorated (if not re-animated) by a movie that had the audience emitting taxi whistles and wild goat cries." In her review for The New York Times, Janet Maslin wrote, "Re-Animator has a fast pace and a good deal of grisly vitality. It even has a sense of humor, albeit one that would be lost on 99.9 percent of any ordinary moviegoing crowd".

Paul Attanasio, in his review for The Washington Post, praised Jeffrey Combs' performance: "Beady-eyed, his face hard, almost lacquered, Combs makes West into a brittle, slightly fey psychotic in the Anthony Perkins mold. West is a figure of fun, but Combs doesn't spoof him." In his review for the Los Angeles Times, Kevin Thomas wrote, "The big noise is Combs, a small, compact man of terrific intensity and concentration." David Edelstein, writing for Village Voice, placed the film in his year-end Top Ten Movies list.

John Nubbin reviewed H.P. Lovecraft's Herbert West: Re-Animator for Different Worlds magazine and stated that "For Lovecraft fans, as well as fans of the Lovecraft-inspired role-playing games, the film is a special treat. The only thing which could be better is the news that the same people are working on a Cthulhu movie. Son of a gun, they are, and if it is as good as Re-Animator, it will be a treat indeed, for this crew seems to have learned the central lesson, which is simply to take the material you are working with seriously. It's the only way to run a smooth scenario, or to tell a good story—in any medium".

In their book Lurker in the Lobby: A Guide to the Cinema of H. P. Lovecraft, Andrew Migliore and John Strysik write: "Re-Animator took First Prize at the Paris Festival of Fantasy, Science Fiction, and Horror, a Special Prize at the Cannes Film Festival, and even spawned a short-lived series of comic books. Even though it was a hit with audiences, the film generated a huge amount of controversy among Lovecraft readers. Fans thought the film a desecration of Lovecraft; their literary hero would never write such obvious exploitation! But the final criticism of the film might have been a bit more muted if these fans had actually read the 'West' stories, which are pure exploitation. Lovecraft himself acknowledged as much, and female love interest and black sex humor aside, Re-Animator really is one of the more faithful and effective adaptations." Bruce C. Hallenbeck, in his book Comedy-Horror Films: A Chronological History, 1914–2008, said the film was one of the few to successfully combine genuine scares with genuine laughs, and praised Combs's performance as retaining the theatricality of classic horror stars. He remarked that "Re-Animator broke down the barriers between 'splatter movies' and comedy-horror films. Its buckets of gore mixed with barrels of laughs, and it opened up a whole new realm where nothing was sacred and nothing was taboo."

Review aggregator website Rotten Tomatoes retrospectively collected 134 reviews and gave the film an approval rating of 88%. The website's critical consensus states, "Perfectly mixing humor and horror, the only thing more effective than Re-Animator's gory scares are its dry, deadpan jokes." Metacritic gave the film a rating of 73 out of 100 based on reviews from 14 critics, indicating "generally favorable reviews". Entertainment Weekly ranked the film number 32 on their list of "The Top 50 Cult Films", and number 14 on their "The Cult 25: The Essential Left-Field Movie Hits Since '83" list.

== Legacy ==
Re-Animator was followed by two sequels: Bride of Re-Animator in 1990 and Beyond Re-Animator in 2003. Re-Animator director Stuart Gordon directed another film based on an H. P. Lovecraft story, From Beyond (1986); though it featured a story unrelated to Re-Animator, it also starred both Jeffrey Combs and Barbara Crampton.

In the book Lurker in the Lobby: A Guide to the Cinema of H. P. Lovecraft, producer-director Brian Yuzna mentions an idea that he had for a fourth Re-Animator. This version would have been titled Island of Re-Animator, and would have been strongly influenced by the H. G. Wells novel The Island of Doctor Moreau.

In 1991, Adventure Comics released three officially licensed comic books based on the 1985 film. These included Re-Animator In Full Color #1-3 (an adaptation of the film), a one-shot entitled Re-Animator: Tales of Herbert West (which reprinted H.P. Lovecraft's original novelette), and a four issue series titled Re-Animator: Dawn of The Re-Animator, a prequel series set in the middle of the 1985 film's prologue scenes. In 2008, the version of Herbert West from the three Re-Animator films appeared in an officially licensed crossover with Tim Seeley's creator-owned comic Hack/Slash #15-17 (set several years after the events of the Beyond Re-Animator film) published by Image Comics. Following the release of Hack/Slash #15, Brian Yuzna and Image Comics were sent a cease and desist letter from a company called ReAnimator LLC (owned by Nick Barucci, the president of comic publisher Dynamite Entertainment) claiming that they owned the trademark to "Re-Animator" and the Herbert West character for comic book publications. While ReAnimator LLC's notice did not have any true legal standing, Hack/Slash #16 and #17 were delayed, and removed the logo of the 1985 film from the cover. Dynamite Entertainment and Brian Yuzna would settle their trademark dispute out of court in 2013, with Yuzna dropping his lawsuit under the agreement that Dynamite would no longer use imagery or the likeness of any characters from the films. Following this agreement, Dynamite Entertainment has continued using a close approximation of the likeness of actor Jeffery Combs for their comics featuring the Herbert West character, though none of their titles published before or since are connected to the 1985 film or its sequels.

The dystopian cyberpunk rock opera act The Protomen is composed of members who take names from their 1980s and 1990s inspirations. In 2009 they added a drummer who goes by the stage name "The Reanimator", who is known for jumping on and climbing on top of instruments and stage elements.

In 2011, a musical adaptation opened in New York, which director Gordon participated in.

In 2017 cult film director Dylan Greenberg released a horror parody of Re-Animator entitled Re-Agitator: Revenge of the Parody starring Aurelio Voltaire Hernandez and Alan Merrill.

== See also ==
- List of cult films
