= List of literary sources for anthology television series =

Many anthology series made for television have been based on literary sources. These sources have gone back as far as Chaucer (The Canterbury Tales) and have included works by classic writers such as Edgar Allan Poe (The Black Cat from Masters of Horror) and Mark Twain (The Adventures of Huckleberry Finn from Climax!).

== The Alfred Hitchcock Hour ==
| Episode | Source | Writer | Type |
|---|---|---|---|
| "Memo from Purgatory" | "Memos from Purgatory" | Harlan Ellison | |

== Black Mirror ==
| Episode | Source | Writer | Type |
|---|---|---|---|
Season 4
| "Black Museum" | "The Pain Addict" | Penn Jillette | Short story |

== Bliss ==
| Episode | Source | Writer | Type |
|---|---|---|---|
Season 1
| "Valentine's Day in Jail" | "Valentine's Day in Jail" | Susan Musgrave | Short story |
| "The Value of X" | "The Value of X" | Emily Schultz | Short story |
| "Voice" | "Some Distinguishing Mark" | Tess Fragoulis | Short story |
| "Leaper" | "Leaper" | Jenny Diski | Short story |

== The Canterbury Tales ==
Each story is an updated version of a story from Chaucer's The Canterbury Tales.

== Climax! ==
| Episode | Source | Writer | Type |
|---|---|---|---|
Season 1
| "The Long Goodbye" | "The Long Goodbye" | Raymond Chandler | Novel |
| "Casino Royale" | "Casino Royale" | Ian Fleming | Novel |
| "Sorry, Wrong Number" | "Sorry, Wrong Number" | Lucille Fletcher | Radio play (episode of "Suspense") |
| "Private Worlds" | Private Worlds | Claudette Colbert | 1935 film |
Season 2
| "Adventures of Huckleberry Finn" | Adventures of Huckleberry Finn | Mark Twain | Novel |

== Creepshow ==
| Episode | Source | Writer | Type |
|---|---|---|---|
Season 1
| "Gray Matter" | "Gray Matter" | Stephen King | Short story |
| "The Finger" | "The Finger" | David J. Schow | Short story |
| "All Hallows Eve" | "All Hallows" | Bruce Jones | Comic book |
| "The Companion" | "The Companion" | Joe R. Lansdale, Kasey Lansdale, Keith Lansdale | Short story |
| "Times is Tough in Musky Holler" | "Times is Tough in Musky Holler" | John Skipp, Dori Miller | Short story |
| "By the Silver Water of Lake Champlain" | "By the Silver Water of Lake Champlain" | Joe Hill | Short story |
Halloween Special
| "Survivor Type" | "Survivor Type" | Stephen King | Short story |
| "Twittering from the Circus of the Dead" | "Twittering from the Circus of the Dead" | Joe Hill | Short story |
Christmas Special
| "Shapeshifters Anonymous" | "Shapeshifters Anonymous" | J. A. Konrath | Short story |
Season 3
| "Mums" | "Mums" | Joe Hill | Short story |
| "A Dead Girl Named Sue" | "A Daed Girl Named Sue" | Craig E. Engler | Short story |

== The Hitchhiker ==
| Episode | Source | Writer | Type |
|---|---|---|---|
Season 2
| "Remembering Melody" | "Remembering Melody" | George R. R. Martin | Short story |
Season 5
| "Her Finest Hour" | "Her Finest Hour" | Christopher Fowler | Short story |
Season 6
| "Riding the Nightmare" | "Riding the Nightmare" | Lisa Tuttle | Short story |

== The Hunger ==
| Episode | Source | Writer | Type |
|---|---|---|---|
Season 1
| "The Swords" | "The Swords" | Robert Aickman | Short story |
| "Menage a Trois" | "Menage a Trois" | F. Paul Wilson | Novelette |
| "Necros" | "Necros" | Brian Lumley | Short story |
| "The Secret Shih Tan" | "The Secret Shih Tan" | Graham Masterton | Short story |
| "Bridal Suite" | "Bridal Suite" | Graham Masterton | Short story |
| "Anais" | "Anais" | Graham Masterton | Short story |
| "No Radio" | "No Radio" | Mickey Friedman | Short story |
| "But At My Back I Always Hear" | "But At My Back I Always Hear" | David Morrell | Short story |
| "Red Light" | "Red Light" | David J. Schow | Short story |
| "I'm Dangerous Tonight" | "I'm Dangerous Tonight" | Cornell Woolrich | Novella |
| "The Sloan Men" | "The Sloan Men" | David Nickle | Short story |
| "Hidebound" | "Hidebound" | Gemma Files | Short story |
| "Fly-By-Night" | "Fly-by-Night" | Gemma Files | Short story |
| "A River of Night's Dreaming" | "The River of Night's Dreaming" | Karl Edward Wagner | Short story |
| "The Lighthouse" | "Horror in the Lighthouse" | Robert Bloch | Short story |
| "The Face of Helene Bournouw" | "The Face of Helene Bournouw" | Harlan Ellison | Short story |
| "Plain Brown Envelope" | "The Plain Brown Envelope" | Lyn Wood | Short story |
| "The Other Woman" | "The Other Woman" | Lois Tilton | Short story |
| "Clarimonde" | "La Morte Amoureuse" | Théophile Gautier | Short story |
| "Footsteps" | "Footsteps" | Harlan Ellison | Short story |
Season 2
| "Skin Deep" | "Skin Deep" | Christa Faust | Short story |
| "The Dream Sentinel" | "The Sixth Sentinel" | Poppy Z. Brite | Short story |
| "And She Laughed" | "And She Laughed" | Liz Holliday | Short story |
| "Nunc Dimittis" | "Nunc Dimittis" | Tanith Lee | Short story |
| "Week Woman" | "Week Woman" | Kim Newman | Short story |
| "Night Bloomer" | "Night Bloomer" | David J. Schow | Short story |
| "The Diarist" | "The Diarist" | Gemma Files | Short story |
| "Replacements" | "Replacements" | Lisa Tuttle | Short story |
| "Wrath of God" | "The Guided Tour" | Gemma Files | Short story |
| "Bottle of Smoke" | "Bottle of Smoke" | Gemma Files | Short story |
| "The Perfect Couple" | "Jeff and Linda" | David J. Schow | Short story |
| "The Sacred Fire" | "The Sacred Fire" | Charles de Lint | Short story |
| "The Seductress" | "The Seductress" | Ramsey Campbell | Short story |
| "Double" | "Beyond Any Measure" | Karl Edward Wagner | Short story |

== Masters of Horror ==
| Episode | Source | Writer | Type |
|---|---|---|---|
| "Incident On and Off a Mountain Road" | "Incident On and Off a Mountain Road" | Joe R. Lansdale | Short story |
| "H. P. Lovecraft's Dreams in the Witch-House" | "The Dreams in the Witch House" | H. P. Lovecraft | Short story |
| "Dance of the Dead (Masters of Horror episode)" | "House of the Dead" | Richard Matheson | Short story |
| "Jenifer" | "Jenifer" | Bruce Jones, Bernie Wrightson | Comic book |
| "Chocolate" | Chocolate | Mick Garris | Short story |
| "The Black Cat" | "The Black Cat" | Edgar Allan Poe | Short story |
| "Homecoming" | "Death & Suffrage" | Dale Bailey | Novelette |
| "The Screwfly Solution" | "The Screwfly Solution" | James Tiptree Jr. | Novelette |
| "Imrpint" | "Bokke e, kyōtē" | Shimako Iwai | Novel |
| "The Washingtonians" | "The Washingtonians" | Bentley Little | Short story |

== Masters of Science Fiction ==
| Episode | Source | Writer | Type |
|---|---|---|---|
| "A Clean Escape" | "A Clean Escape" | John Kessel | Play |
| "The Awakening" | "The Awakening" | Howard Fast | Story |
| "Jerry Was a Man" | "Jerry Was a Man" | Robert A. Heinlein | Short story |
| "The Discarded" | "The Discarded" | Harlan Ellison | Short story |

== Monsters ==
| Episode | Source | Writer | Type |
|---|---|---|---|
Season 1
| "The Legacy" | "The Chaney Legacy" | Robert Bloch | Short story |
| "Rouse Him Not" | "Rouse Him Not" | Manly Wade Wellman | Short story |
| "All in a Day's Work" | "All in a Day's Work" | Maureen F. McHugh | Novelette |
| "Mannikins of Horror" | "Mannikins of Horror" | Robert Bloch | Short story |
| "La Strega" | "La Strega" | Richard Russo | Short story |
Season 2
| "The Demons" | "The Demons" | Robert Sheckley | Short story |
| "Reaper" | "Reaper" | Robert Bloch | Short story |
| "Far Below" | "Far Below" | Robert Barbour Johnson | Short story |
Season 3
| "Bug House" | "Bug House" | Lisa Tuttle | Short story |
| "The Young and the Headless" | "The Monster-Maker" | W.C. Morrow | Short story |
| "The Space-Eaters" | "The Space-Eaters" | Frank Belknap Long | Short story |
| "The Moving Finger" | "The Moving Finger" | Stephen King | Short story |

== Night Gallery ==
| Episode | Source | Writer | Type |
|---|---|---|---|
Season 1
| "The Dead Man" | "The Dead Man" | Fritz Leiber | Short story |
| "The Little Black Bag" | "The Little Black Bag" | Cyril M. Kornbluth | Short story |
Season 2
| "A Fear of Spiders" | "The Spider" | Elizabeth Walter | Short story |
| "Marmalade Wine" | "Marmalade Wine" | Joan Aiken | Short story |
| "The Academy" | "The Academy" | David Ely | Short story |
| "Pickman's Model" | "Pickman's Model" | HP Lovecraft | Short story |
| "Silent Snow, Secret Snow" | "Silent Snow, Secret Snow" | Conrad Aiken | Short story |

== Nightmare Classics ==
| Episode | Source | Writer | Type |
|---|---|---|---|
| "The Turn of the Screw" | "The Turn of the Screw | Henry James | Novella |
| "Carmilla" | "Carmilla" | J. Sheridan Le Fanu | Novella |
| "The Strange Case of Dr. Jekyll and Mr. Hyde" | "The Strange Case of Dr. Jekyll and Mr. Hyde" | Robert Louis Stevenson | Novella |
| "The Eyes of the Panther" | "The Eyes of the Panther" | Ambrose Bierce | Short story |

== Nightmares and Dreamscapes: From the Stories of Stephen King ==
All episodes based on the short stories by Stephen King.

== The Outer Limits ==
=== The Outer Limits (1964) ===
| Episode | Source | Writer | Type |
|---|---|---|---|
Season 2
| "Soldier" | "Soldier From Tomorrow" | Harlan Ellison | Short story |
| "I, Robot" | "I, Robot" | Eando Binder | Short story |

=== The Outer Limits (1995 - 2002) ===
| Episode | Source | Writer | Type |
|---|---|---|---|
Season 1
| "The Sandkings" | "Sandkings" | George RR Martin | Short story |
| "The Conversion" | "Two Strangers" | Richard B. Lewis | Short story |
| "I, Robot" | "I, Robot" | Eando Binder | Short story |
Season 2
| "First Anniversary" | "First Anniversary" | Richard Matheson | Short story |
| "Inconstant Moon" | "Inconstant Moon" | Larry Niven | Short story |
Season 3
| "The Revelations of 'Becka Paulson" | "The Revelations of 'Becka Paulson" | Stephen King | Short story |
| "Feasibility Study" | "A Feasibility Study" | Joseph Stefano | Original Outer Limits episode |
Season 5
| "The Human Operators" | "The Human Operators" | Harlan Ellison, A.E. van Vogt | Novelette |
Season 7
| "Think Like a Dinosaur" | "Think Like a Dinosaur" | James Patrick Kelly | Novelette |

== The Ray Bradbury Theater ==
All stories by Ray Bradbury, many based on his short stories.

== Tales from the Crypt ==
Mostly from EC Comics stories. See List of Tales from the Crypt episodes.

== Tales from the Darkside ==
| Episode | Source | Writer | Type |
|---|---|---|---|
Season 1
| "The Word Processor of the Gods" | Word Processor of the Gods | Stephen King | Short story |
| "Djinn, No Chaser" | "Djinn, No Chaser" | Harlan Ellison | Story |
Season 3
| "The Bitterest Pill" | "The Richest Man in Levittown" | Frederick Pohl | Short story |
Season 4
| "The Yattering and Jack" | "The Yattering and Jack" | Clive Barker | |
| "Love Hungry" | "Food for Thought" | Roberts Gannaway | |

== Tales of the Unexpected ==
Early episodes based on Roald Dahl's short stories.

== The United States Steel Hour ==
| Episode | Source | Writer | Type |
|---|---|---|---|
Season 1
| "Hedda Gabler" | "Hedda Gabler" | Henrik Ibsen | Play |
| "The Rise and Fall of Silas Lapham" | "The Rise of Silas Lapham" | William Dean Howells | Novel |
| "A Garden in the Sea" | "The Aspern Papers" | Henry James | Novella |
Season 4
| "We Must Kill Toni" | "We Must Kill Toni" | Ian Stuart Black | Play |
| "Bang the Drum Slowly" | "Bang the Drum Slowly" | Mark Harris | Novel |
| "Tom Sawyer" | "The Adventures of Tom Sawyer" | Mark Twain | Novel |
| "The Bottle Imp" | "The Bottle Imp" | Robert Louis Stevenson | Short story |
Season 6
| "Family Happiness" | "Family Happiness" | Leo Tolstoy | Novella |
| "The Pink Burro" | "The Pink Burro" | Jean Riley | Play |
Season 8
| "The Yum Yum Girl" | "The Yum-Yum Girl" | John Latham Toohey | Short story |
| "The Two Worlds of Charlie Gordon" | "Flowers for Algernon" | Daniel Keyes | Short story |
| "Watching Out for Dulie" | "Watching Out for Dulie" | David Westheimer | Novel |
Season 10
| "Wanted: Someone Innocent" | "Wanted: Someone Innocent" | Margery Allingham | Novella |
| "The Old Lady Shows Her Medals" | "The Old Lady Shows Her Medals" | J. M. Barrie | Play |
