= Resistance (Battlestar Galactica) =

- Battlestar Galactica episode
- Starbuck and Helo talk to Sam Anders.
- Episode no.: Season 2 Episode 4
- Directed by: Allan Kroeker
- Written by: Toni Graphia
- Original air date: August 5, 2005

Guest appearances
- Michael Trucco as Sam Anders; Kate Vernon as Ellen Tigh; Donnelly Rhodes as Doctor Cottle; Lorena Gale as Priestess Elosha; Richard Hatch as Tom Zarek (Note: Special guest star); Chris Shields as Cpl. Venner; Bodie Olmos as Hot Dog; Leah Cairns as Racetrack; Dominic Zamprogna as Jammer; Jeremy Guilbaut as Lt. Joe "Hammerhead" Palladino

Episode chronology
← Previous "Fragged"	Next → "The Farm"

"Resistance" is the fourth episode of the second season of the reimagined Battlestar Galactica television series. It aired originally on the Sci Fi Channel on August 5, 2005.

In the episode, Marines fire on civilians following Colonel Saul Tigh's declaration of martial law. President Laura Roslin and Lee "Apollo" Adama escape Galactica, Commander William Adama recovers, and Specialist Cally kills Galactica-Boomer. On Caprica, Starbuck and Helo join a human resistance group led by Sam Anders.

== Plot ==
When civilian ships protest martial law, acting commander Tigh orders Marines to take withheld supplies by force. On the civilian ship Gideon, Marines open fire on a hostile but unarmed crowd of civilians, killing four. Fearing a split in the fleet, President Roslin and Apollo enlist help from Racetrack and Dualla to escape the brig, and go into hiding with Tom Zarek, Roslin's erstwhile political enemy.

Tigh has Chief Galen Tyrol thrown in a cell with Boomer who has recently been found to be a Cylon. He then orders Baltar to determine whether he is also a Cylon. Instead, Baltar injects Tyrol with poison and demands that Boomer reveal the number of Cylon agents still secretly aboard the fleet. After Boomer guesses that there are eight agents, Baltar administers the antidote and later clears Tyrol of being a Cylon.

On Caprica, Starbuck and Helo encounter humans who survived the initial Cylon attacks and formed a resistance group. After a firefight and a Mexican standoff, the two groups persuade each other they are not Cylons by discussing sports.

Back on Galactica, a still-weak Commander Adama resumes command. Tigh confesses he has made mistakes, but Adama sympathizes with the pressures of command. An angry crowd gathers to witness Boomer's transfer to a specially-constructed holding cell. During the transfer, Specialist Cally shoots Boomer, who dies in Tyrol's arms declaring her love for him.

== Characterization ==
In his podcast commentary on "Resistance", executive producer Ronald D. Moore discussed his views of what the episode's events reveal about several of the characters.

- As in his commentary on the season premiere, "Scattered", Moore notes that Tigh proves that he is a poor leader when the fleet is not under attack. He is held back by his lack of political skill, his emotional reactions and Ellen's manipulation. Moore's "Scattered" podcast also mentions Tigh's drinking; Tigh is shown drinking numerous times in "Resistance".
- Moore says that Ellen's manipulation is both conscious and unconscious. Ellen reacts to Saul's weakness by attacking.
- According to Moore, Baltar's extortion in Boomer's cell is the beginning of a darkening of his character. Baltar hoped to continue his manipulation during the planned tests if Cally had not killed Boomer.
- According to Moore, neither Roslin nor Apollo contemplated escape until the Gideon shooting.
- Starbuck and Anders are each supposed to be able to tell intuitively that the other is not a Cylon. Moore says a character point like this is difficult to show onscreen and does not feel it came across in this case.
- Over preceding episodes, Roslin's Marine guard, Corporal Venner, comes to believe she is a divinely appointed leader, and in "Resistance" he helps her escape the brig. Moore ascribes this both to the guard's background on a "fundamentalist" human colony but also to the general lack of a strong central authority since the destruction of the Colonies. The writers considered planning an expanded role for Venner in future episodes but decided against it.

== Analysis ==
Moore notes that Tigh's actions in "Resistance" make it easy to think badly of him despite Tigh's positive contributions; Moore cites examples in the miniseries that served as the series's backdoor pilot and the episodes "33", "Scattered", and "Valley of Darkness". Moore suggests this raises questions about "the nature of heroism".

Moore compares the shooting aboard the Gideon to the Boston Massacre. A group of ill-prepared soldiers, faced with a hostile mob, hears a shot fired and panics. Moore is careful to point out that who fires the first shot on the Gideon is unknown.

Questioned by Ellen why Tigh did not shoot down Roslin's Raptor, Tigh replies, "It was his son." However, Susan Tankersley of Television Without Pity argues Tigh would not have shot down Roslin's Raptor even if Apollo had not been aboard. In her analysis, Tigh is by now aware of the negative impacts of his bad decisions and unwilling to kill someone he knows is not truly his enemy. Tankersley also speculates things might have ended differently if Tigh were drunk, but in this scene he "seems sober."

In "Scattered", in return for parole, Apollo agreed not to "make any attempt to free [Roslin] or sow insurrection among the crew" while on duty. Moore is unsure whether Apollo's actions in "Resistance" constitute a parole violation, since he secures passage to the launching bay by telling his guards he is needed to help a Raptor Pilot. In Moore's view, the question is important for Apollo's character as "a point of honor". Jason Davis of Mania calls Apollo "mutinous".

Two shots with blood dropping on the floor appear in the episode: one after Tigh interrogates Tyrol, and one after Boomer dies. Davis says this "recurring visual motif... continues the philosophical debate on what it means to be human/Cylon".

Moore, Tankersley, Davis, Jen Segrest of AOL's TV Squad, Jacob Clifton of Television Without Pity, and Simon Brew of Den of Geek compare Cally's actions in this episode to those of Jack Ruby.

== Production ==
=== Writing ===
During development, "Resistance" was known as the "Kent State episode" because of how Tigh's heavy-handed tactics lead to civilian deaths. Moore later came to believe the incident bears greater resemblance to the Boston Massacre.

Early plot outlines for "Resistance" included scenes in which Baltar would interrogate Boomer. The writers replaced these scenes with the Tyrol subplot after realizing that other characters would likely suspect Tyrol following his rescue from Kobol in the previous episode, "Fragged". Later the writers considered establishing a love triangle among Baltar, Boomer, and Six.

In early drafts, Ellen was shown playing a direct role in running Galactica, giving orders and urging Saul to shoot down Roslin's Raptor in the CIC. The writers decided this was less believable than her indirect influence through manipulating Saul's emotions.

Boomer's last words are, "I love you, Chief." Moore had her call him by his title rather than his first name because Moore thinks "Galen" sounds funny and feared it would interfere with the audience's experience of the moment. For comparison he cited George Costanza's reaction in Seinfeld to learning that Kramer's first name is Cosmo.

The writers had Billy decline to go with Roslin because actor Paul Campbell would be unavailable to shoot the next episode. Campbell was in Los Angeles filming a pilot for another series that was not picked up.

=== Filming ===
Director Allan Kroeker shot the first scene set on Caprica, in which the resistance fighters spot Starbuck and Helo and decide to kill them, from the resistance's perspective. He did this to provide a different flavor to a situation in which protagonists mistakenly target other protagonists, which Moore called "a very traditional plot move." The shootout and standoff were filmed in one day, but because of safety issues and the complexity of the choreography it took, in Moore's words, "an ungodly amount of time."

The scenes in the launching bay before Roslin's escape were filmed in front of a green screen, as the crew did not have access to a large enough set. The blood drops in the shots at the beginning and end of "Resistance" are both CGI.

Asked in a December 2005 interview what was the most difficult scene in the series to shoot, actor Aaron Douglas (Tyrol) said, "The scenes where someone dies in the Chief's arms are difficult to do because they take a really long time to shoot and you are constantly in a state of loss and sadness. They are very draining."

== Connections to other series elements ==
- The writers intended this episode's scenes between Apollo and Dee to hint at developments in their relationship planned for later in the second season. (Dee glances downward at Apollo as he exits one of these scenes.) In "Sacrifice", they go on a date. In Part 2 of "Lay Down Your Burdens" it is revealed that they marry during humanity's residence on planet New Caprica, before the Cylon occupation. Seeing the characters' dynamic in "Resistance" convinced Moore to develop their relationship.

== Reception ==
"Resistance" received favorable critical review. In a positive review, Segrest especially praised actor James Callis (Baltar). Tankersley gave "Resistance" a B, praising Callis and the scenes between the Tighs, but criticizing the scenes on Caprica as alternately confusingly frantic and boring. Davis praised the performances of actors Michael Hogan (Saul Tigh) and Kate Vernon (Ellen Tigh), and the episode's treatment of "the dangers and moral uncertainty underlying any breaking of the chain of command". Davis compared Battlestar Galactica favorably to Babylon 5 in this regard. Brew also reviewed the episode favorably, expressing appreciation for the focus on conflicts among humans rather than between human and Cylon.

Eric Goldman of IGN ranked Tigh taking command at #11 on his list of the top 20 storylines and moments in the re-imagined Battlestar Galactica.
