= Fragged (Battlestar Galactica) =

- Battlestar Galactica episode
- Gaius Baltar (James Callis), immediately after fragging Crashdown.
- Episode no.: Season 2 Episode 3
- Directed by: Sergio Mimica-Gezzan
- Written by: Dawn Prestwich; Nicole Yorkin
- Original air date: July 29, 2005

Guest appearances
- Sam Witwer as Crashdown; Kate Vernon as Ellen Tigh; Donnelly Rhodes as Doctor Cottle; Richard Hatch as Tom Zarek (Note: Special guest star); Kerry Norton as Paramedic Layne Ishay; Kurt Evans as Paramedic Howard Kim; Chris Shields as Cpl. Venner; Jennifer Halley as Seelix; Leah Cairns as Racetrack; Patricia Idlette as Sarah Porter; Malcolm Stewart as Marshall Bagot

Episode chronology
← Previous "Valley of Darkness"	Next → "Resistance"
- Battlestar Galactica season 2

"Fragged" is the third episode of the second season of the Battlestar Galactica television series. It aired originally on the Sci Fi Channel on July 29, 2005. It is the first episode in which Starbuck does not appear.

In the episode, on Kobol, Crashdown leads an ill fated assault on a Cylon missile battery. Gaius Baltar frags Crashdown, to Head Six's approval, shortly before the survey team is rescued. On Galactica, Colonel Saul Tigh's gambit to discredit President Laura Roslin fails, and he declares martial law.

"Fragged" received an award at the 2005 VES Awards for the (animated) Cylon Centurions appearing in the episode. Critics reviewed "Fragged" favorably.

== Plot ==
In "Scattered", Head Six told Baltar that they would have a child. Crashdown ordered Specialist Tarn to retrieve medical supplies to treat the wounded Specialist Socinus, but Tarn died in a Cylon ambush. In "Valley of Darkness", Chief Galen Tyrol and Specialist Cally brought the supplies, but Socinus died anyway.

=== Kobol ===
Crashdown leads a brief funeral for Tarn and Socinus. Six tells Baltar that, because they died on Kobol, Tarn and Socinus have only oblivion waiting them. Later, Baltar asks why God would want to bring a child into a world so full of killing; Six replies that God wants to give humanity a chance at redemption.

Tyrol observes Cylons building a missile battery, which he believes they will use to shoot down human search parties. Crashdown orders an attack on the battery despite the team's inexperience in combat and inadequate equipment. Tyrol privately tries to persuade him to instead attack the guidance system, which is less heavily guarded, but Crashdown waves the bloody shirt of Tarn and Socinus and pulls rank. Tyrol is unconvinced but nonetheless silences Baltar's protests during Crashdown's briefing.

Six warns Baltar that one of the survivors will betray the others and that his life is in danger, because what happens on Kobol is not God's will. Crashdown refuses to change the plan even after discovering that the Cylons have reinforced the battery. Cally freezes up under pressure, and Crashdown threatens to kill her unless she obeys his orders. Baltar shoots Crashdown before he can carry out his threat; Six congratulates him.

Tyrol destroys the Cylon guiding system in time to save the rescue Raptors, which in turn destroy the Cylons. The survivors cover up Crashdown's murder. Baltar despairs at the thought that killing rather than culture is humanity's legacy.

=== Galactica ===
Doctor Cottle arrives and operates on Commander William Adama, saving his life. Cottle is unavailable to provide Roslin with her cancer medication, and she undergoes severe withdrawal. A drunken Colonel Tigh lashes out at his subordinates. The Quorum of Twelve demands access to Roslin, who is still in Galactica's brig. Ellen Tigh persuades her husband to agree, believing the sight of Roslin's delirious condition will undermine her authority. The plan backfires after Roslin's Marine guard smuggles her medication. She denounces Adama's coup and convinces at least some of the Quorum that she is the leader foretold in their sacred scriptures who will guide humanity to Earth. (Note: The connection between the Earth of the re-imagined Battlestar Galactica and the real-life Earth is unknown at this point in the series.) Furious, Tigh dissolves the Quorum and declares martial law.

== Analysis ==
In a review of "Fragged", Jen Segrest of AOL's TV Squad discusses Baltar's character, calling his "descent into madness... tragic," but also noting that the audience can identify with his guilt for allowing the Cylons into the Colonies' defense computers in the miniseries that served as the series's backdoor pilot. Segrest also notes how Baltar's instinct for self-preservation helps him defend himself and the other survivors against the Cylons and attributes his lie about Crashdown's death to "a bit of honor left in him".

In another review, Jason Davis of Mania reflects on Head Six's comments about humanity's inclination toward killing, noting that Babylon 5 covered similar ground. He describes a difference between humans and Cylons in this regard: humans kill one another, while Cylons do not. Davis also proposes a mythology within the Battlestar Galactica universe, in which the humans killed their creators, the gods who once lived with them on Kobol, whether literally or in the sense of Nietzsche (God is dead). In Davis's view, "The Cylons, having reached a certain advanced point of development, now seek to do likewise" to their own creators, humanity. In his review of the episode "Home, Part 1", Davis compares the Cylons' journey with the events of Star Trek: The Motion Picture. In a January 2006 interview, executive producer Ronald D. Moore said of the Cylons, "they see themselves as the children of humanity, and their worldview says they’ll never really achieve their full potential while their 'parents' are still alive".

== Reception ==
"Fragged" won a Visual Effects Society Award for its animated Cylon Centurions.

"Fragged" won the 2005 Visual Effects Society Award for the Centurions in the category "Outstanding Performance by an Animated Character in a Live Action Broadcast Program, Commercial, or Music Video".

Critical reaction to "Fragged" was favorable. Segrest reviewed the episode favorably, saying, "Anyone who thought the show would suffer a sophomore slump should be eating their words. This show doesn't just deserve a Hugo award, it deserves Emmys." Davis gave "Fragged" an A and praised the performances of Michael Hogan (Tigh), Richard Hatch (Zarek), and Donnelly Rhodes (Cottle). Susan Tankersley of Television Without Pity gave "Fragged" a B.

Eric Goldman of IGN ranked Tigh taking command at #11 on his list of the top 20 storylines and moments in the re-imagined Battlestar Galactica. He ranked Crashdown's failure of leadership at #12, commenting, "The entire storyline with these characters on Kobol provided the opportunity to elevate several members of the supporting cast in intriguing ways". Jackson Alpern of Maxim ranked Baltar fragging Crashdown as the 10th best moment in the series.
