= 4th Visual Effects Society Awards =

US film and TV awards ceremony in 2006

- Date: February 16, 2006

Highlights
- Best Visual Effects – Motion Picture: King Kong

The 4th Visual Effects Society Awards, given in Los Angeles on February 15, 2006, at the Hollywood Palladium, honored the best visual effects in film and television of 2005. An edited version of the ceremony was broadcast on HDNet.

== Winners and nominees ==
(Winners in bold)

=== Honorary Awards ===
George Melies Award for Pioneering:

- **John Lasseter**

Board of Directors Award:

- **Jim Morris**

=== Film ===
Outstanding Visual Effects in an Effects Driven Motion Picture	Outstanding Supporting Visual Effects in a Motion Picture
**King Kong** – Joe Letteri, Eileen Moran, Christian Rivers, Eric Saindon: The Chronicles of Narnia – Dean Wright, Randy Starr, Bill Westenhofer, Jim Berney; Harry Potter and the Goblet of Fire – Jim Mitchell, Theresa Corrao, Tim Alexander, Tim Webber; Star Wars: Episode III – Revenge of the Sith – John Knoll, Roger Guyett, Rob Coleman, Denise Ream	**Kingdom of Heaven** – Wes Sewell, Victoria Alonso, Tom Wood, Gary Brozenich: Jarhead – Pablo Helman, Jeanie King, Grady Cofer, Brett Northcutt; Memoirs Of A Geisha – Robert Stromberg, Julia Frey, Paul Graff, Adam Watkins
Best Single Visual Effect of the Year	Outstanding Performance by an Animated Character in a Live Action Motion Picture
**War of the Worlds -Fleeing the Neighborhood** – Dennis Muren, Pablo Helman, Sandra Scott, Marshall Krasser: Charlie and the Chocolate Factory - Nut Room – Nick Davis, Nikki Penny, Jon Thum, Ben Morris; Star Wars: Episode III – Revenge of the Sith - Opening Space Battle – John Knoll, Jill Brooks, David Weitzberg, Jeff Sutherland	**King Kong – Kong** – Andy Serkis, Christian Rivers, Atsushi Sato, Guy Williams: The Chronicles of Narnia: The Lion, the Witch and the Wardrobe - Aslan – Richie Baneham, Erik De Boer, Matt Logue, Joe Ksander; Harry Potter and the Goblet of Fire - Dragon – Steve Rawlins, Eric Wong, Robert Weaver, Steve Nichols
Outstanding Performance by an Animated Character in an Animated Motion Picture	Outstanding Created Environment in a Live Action Motion Picture
**Wallace & Gromit: The Curse of the Were-Rabbit – Gromit** – Loyd Price: Madagascar - King Julian – Rex Grignon, Denis Couchon; Robots - Fender – Robin Williams, David Torres, Mark Piretti, Ben Williams	**King Kong -New York Dawn Attack** – Dan Lemmon, R. Christopher White, Matt Aitken, Charles Tait: Batman Begins - Gotham City Monorail Chase – Alex Wuttke, Pete Bebb, Dayne Cowan, Imery Watson; Harry Potter and the Goblet of Fire - Black Lake Environment – Andy Kind, Ivan Moran, Rob Allman, Justin Martin; Star Wars: Episode III – Revenge of the Sith – Jonathan Harb, Hilmar Koch, Yannick Dusseault, Brett Northcutt
Outstanding Models and Miniatures in a Motion Picture	Outstanding Compositing in a Motion Picture
**War of the Worlds** – Ed Hirsh, Steve Gawley, Joshua Ong, Russell Paul: Harry Potter and the Goblet of Fire - The Hogwarts School – Jose Granell, Nigel Stone; Star Wars: Episode III – Revenge of the Sith – Brian Gernand, Pamela Choy, Ron Woodall, Kevin Reuter	**War of the Worlds** – Marshall Krasser, Michael Jamieson, Jeff Saltzman, Regan Mcgee: Harry Potter and the Goblet of Fire -Voldemort's Nose – Ben Shepherd, Uel Horman, Charley Henley, Nicolas Aithadi; King Kong - T-Rex Fight – Erik Winquist, Michaell Pangrazio, Steve Cronin, Suzanne Jandu

=== Television ===
Outstanding Visual Effects in a Broadcast Series	Outstanding Supporting Visual Effects in a Broadcast Program
**Rome - Episode 1** – Barrie Hemsley, James Madigan, Duncan Kinnaird, Joe Pavlo: Invasion - Origin of Species – Armen Kevorkian, Matt Scharf, John Karner, Neil Sopata; Smallville - Commencement – Mat Beck, John Wash, John Han, Trent Smith	**Lost - Exodus Part 2** – Kevin Blank, Mitchell Ferm, Eric Chauvin, John Teska: Alias - The Index – Kevin Blank, Armen Kevorkian, Eric Chauvin, Jonathan Spencer Levy
Outstanding Visual Effects in a Broadcast Miniseries, Movie or Special	Outstanding Visual Effects in a Commercial
**Walking with Monsters** – Tim Greenwood, Jo Nodwell, Neil Glasbey, Darren Byford: Comet Collision – John Gross, Nick Black, Christian Bloch, Casey Benn; Super Bowl XXXIX: Open – Benoit Girard, Jason Crosby, Jerome Morin, Chris Del Conte	**Guinness - noitulovE** – William Bartlett, Scott Griffin, Andrew Boyd, Dan Seddon: Esuvee - Keep it on all Fours – William Bartlett, Scott Griffin, Jake Mengers, Andrew Boyd; Motorola - PEBL – Eric Barba, Lisa Beroud, Janelle Croshaw, Greg Teegarden
Outstanding Visual Effects in a Music Video	Outstanding Performance by an Animated Character in a Broadcast Program, Commercial or Music Video
**Nine Inch Nails – "Only"** – Eric Barba, Lisa Beroud, Jay Barton, Jim Gaczkowski: The Chemical Brothers - Believe – Ben Cronin, Rebecca Barbour, Andrew Boyd, Jamie Isles; Rob Thomas - Lonely No More – Bert Yukich	**Battlestar Galactica - Season 2, Episode 03: Fragged - Cylon Centurian** – Andrew Karr, Louie Hinayo, Gary Hughes, Allan Henderson: Battlestar Galactica - Valley of Darkness - Cylon – Dustin Adair, Mark Shimer, Lane Jolly, Steve Graves; Surface - Episode 102 - Nimrod – Eric Hance, Robert Bonachune, John Teska, Sean Jackson
Outstanding Created Environment in a Broadcast Program, Commercial or Music Video	Outstanding Models and Miniatures in a Broadcast Program, Commercial or Music Video
**Into the West - Movies I, II and III** – Cedric Tomacruz, David Bailey, Valeri Pfahning, Siddhartha Jayakar: Motorola - PEBL – Jim Gaczkowski, Daniel Thron, Janelle Croshaw, Greg Teegarden; Nine Inch Nails - Only – Janelle Croshaw, Greg Teegarden, Jim Gaczkowski, Scott Edelstein	**Las Vegas - Episode 308 - Bold, Beautiful and Blue** – Michael Cook, Anthony Ocampo, Eugene Kim, Renaud Talon: Ford - World Traveler – Matthew Gratzner, Enrico Altmann, Matt Burlingame; Walgreens - Giving Tree/Last Minute - Winter Neighborhood – Ian Hunter, Forest Fischer, Seth Curlin, Joachum (Joe) Duppel
Outstanding Compositing in a Broadcast Program, Commercial or Music Video	
**Empire** – Stefano Trivelli, Michele Moen, Kelly Bumgarner, Sean Wilson: Into the West - Movie I: Wheel to the Stars – Jared Jones, Jason Korber, Geeta Basantani, Ryan Dutour; Mezzo Djarum – Robert Nederhorst, Marc Rienzo, Feliciano di Giorgio, Maciek Sokalski	

=== Other categories ===
Outstanding Real Time Visuals in a Video Game	Outstanding Pre-Rendered Visuals in a Video Game
**Need for Speed: Most Wanted** – Habib Zargarpour, Luke Wasserman, Greg D. Esposito, Colin O'Connor: From Russia With Love – David Carson, Darren Pattenden, Ben Wanat; Madden NFL 06 Football Video Game For Xbox 360 – Mark Mongie, Jim Spoto, Tommy Cinquegrano, Dale Jackson	**Prince of Persia: The Two Thrones – The Palace Balcony Cinematic** – Jean-Jacques Tremblay, Raphasel Lacoste, Anne Mai Le Bouyonnec: Need for Speed: Most Wanted – Habib Zargarpour, Michael Mann, Mataio Gardi, Jason Dowdeswell; Prince of Persia: The Two Thrones - The Battle Cinematic – Jean-Jacques Tremblay, Raphasel LaCoste, Kun Chang; Stranger's Wrath - In Game Story Clips – Sherry McKenna, Lorne Lanning, Raymond Swanland, Iain Morton
Outstanding Visual Effects in a Special Venue Project	
**Magnificent Desolation: Walking on the Moon 3D** – Jack Geist, Sean Phillips, Johnathan Banta, Jerome Morin: Curse of Darkcastle... The Ride – Dina Benadon, Brent Young, Chuck Comisky, Mario Kamberg; Deepo's Undersea 3D Wondershow – Michel Heroux, Benoit Girard, Jerome Morin, Chris Del Conte	
