= Necessary Heartbreak =

2008 book by M. J. Sullivan

- Author: M.J. Sullivan
- Language: English
- Genre: Novel
- Publisher: iUniverse
- Publication date: 29 September 2008
- Publication place: United States
- Media type: Print (Hardcover)
- Pages: 160 pp (first edition, hardcover)
- ISBN: 978-0595506408 (first edition, hardcover)
- OCLC: 276934676

Necessary Heartbreak, the first book in the When Time Forgets series, is a Fall 2008 book from author M.J. Sullivan and editor Jenn Kujawski. Screenwriter Sam Hamm encouraged the publication of this work in the series.

== Plot summary ==
Michael Stewart is a single dad in modern-day New York struggling to raise his feisty 13-year-old daughter, Elizabeth. Feeling beaten down by life, he shuts out new relationships but fate, or perhaps something more divine, has other plans. When they stumble upon a root-cellar door in a church basement, they discover a portal leading back to first-century Jerusalem during the tumultuous last week of Christ’s life. There they encounter Leah, a grieving widow, and a menacing soldier, determined to take Elizabeth as his own.

Trapped in the past - both literally and figuratively - Michael comes face to face with some of his most limiting beliefs, and realizes he must open himself up to the possibility of a deeper faith in God, people, himself, and love if he is to find his way home.

== Setting ==
The main backdrop for the story is first-century Jerusalem during the final week of Jesus’ life. Centered on an Israeli home, the actions of the main characters spotlight many historical and theological components of this ancient era.

The primary domicile is a two-story edifice encircled by a courtyard that is loosely based on archaeological findings. The first floor contains a primitive yet functional kitchen, an enclosed pen for small livestock, and access to the posterior of the home where a rudimentary sewage system was located. Other features of the building include a second floor where the characters eat their meals and sleep. The roof of the house is also a prominent feature used to view the wooded hills to the east of ancient Jerusalem.

Many scenes in the book are formulated around historically significant moments in Jesus’ final days before the crucifixion. The palm procession widely known from the four gospels is recreated to suggest a pacifistic response to Pontius Pilate’s reentry from his home base in Caesarea Maritima to police Jerusalem during the Jewish Passover.
