= Kerry Norton =

British actress

- Born: 11 October 1972 (age 54); Sunbury-on-Thames, Surrey, England
- Occupations: Actress, singer
- Years active: 1995–present
- Spouse: Jamie Bamber
- Children: 3

Kerry Norton (born 11 October 1972) is a British actress and singer.

== Early life ==
Norton was born and raised in Sunbury-on-Thames.

== Education ==
Norton was educated at Sunbury Manor School, a state comprehensive school in Sunbury-on-Thames.

She trained at London Contemporary Dance School in London, and at Lee Strasberg Theatre Institute in New York City.

== Career ==
Norton was a gymnast before becoming an actress.

She had a small part on the American TV series, Sabrina the Teenage Witch, in 1996. The episode, entitled "A Girl and Her Cat", had her play the part of Lulu, a gymnastic witch, who was engaged to Sabrina's second cousin.

She has made a number of guest appearances on Battlestar Galactica as paramedic Layne Ishay (with her real-life husband as Major Lee 'Apollo' Adama). She appeared in the first three episodes of season 2, "Scattered", "Valley of Darkness" and "Fragged", and a later episode entitled "Downloaded". She also appeared in the season 3 episode "Taking a Break from All Your Worries", and the season 4 episodes "A Disquiet Follows My Soul", "No Exit", "Islanded in a Stream of Stars" and "Daybreak, Parts 1 and 2".

She also played the leading role of Anne Alstein in The Screwfly Solution. She played the part of Maxi Purvis in Bad Girls' third and fourth series and was a member of the original cast of the touring play Seven Deadly Sins Four Deadly Sinners.

== Music career ==
In 2005 she recorded an album of covers, titled Young Heart. Track number three ("Everlasting Love") has also been used in a commercial for Grolsch Brewery.

In that same year she recorded Greensleeves as a duet with the Dutch singer Rene Froger for his Christmas album Pure Christmas, released on EMI Music.

== Personal life ==
Norton is married to actor Jamie Bamber. They have three daughters: Isla Elizabeth Angela Griffith and twins Darcy Beatrice and Ava Molly.

== Filmography ==
Film
Year	Title	Role	Notes
1995	Demonsoul	Erica Steele	Feature film
1996	Virtual Terror	Caroline Jarvis	Feature film
1998	Nice Guys…	Ashlyn	Feature film
2002	Hide	Doe	Short film
2003	The Devil's Tattoo	Annie	Feature film
2012	Tom and Jerry: Robin Hood and His Merry Mouse	Maid Marion (singing)	Direct-to-video film
2012	Filly Brown	Amanda Hutchinson	Feature film
2014	Attack on Space	Carla Jaeger	Short film
2014	Speed Dating	Pippa	Short film
2015	The Pavement	Wife	Short film
2016	ToY	Kat	Feature film
2016	A Journey to a Journey	Professor Susan Robards	Feature film
2016	Monday Nights at Seven	Maya	Feature film
2016	Sing for Your Supper	Fruit Buyer	Short film
2019	Dirty God	Consultant Burns Surgeon	Feature film
2020	Avernus	Beth	Short film

Television
Year	Title	Role	Notes
1996	Sabrina the Teenage Witch	Lulu	Season 1 (episode: "A Girl and Her Cat")
1997	The Weird Al Show	Contortionist #1	Season 1 (recurring, 5 episodes)
2000	Randall and Hopkirk (Deceased)	Spirit Girl	Season 1 (episode: "Drop Dead")
2001	Casualty	Sporty Spice	Season 15 (episode: "Girl Power")
2001–02	Bad Girls	Maxi Purvis	Seasons 3–4 (main, 17 episodes)
2001	The Big Breakfast	Herself	Episode broadcast 26 October 2001
2003	The Human Mind	Herself	Miniseries (episode: "Making Friends")
2004	Murphy's Law	Polly McKenna	Season 2 (episode: "Jack's Back")
2004–06	EastEnders	Nurse Rosa	4 episodes
2005–09	Battlestar Galactica	Paramedic Layne Ishay	Season 2–4 (recurring, 10 episodes)
2006	Masters of Horror	Anne	Season 2 (episode: "The Screwfly Solution")
2006	Showbiz Poker	Herself	Season 1, Episode 8
2016	Berlin Station	FBI Woman	Season 1 (episode: Oratorio Berlin)
2016	Untitled Sarah Silverman Project	Helen	TV movie
2017	Casualty	Judith Crompton	Season 31 (episode: "War of the Roses")
2020	Trader	Malory Lee	
2022	Angelyne	Edie Wallach	Miniseries
