= Sunbury Manor School =

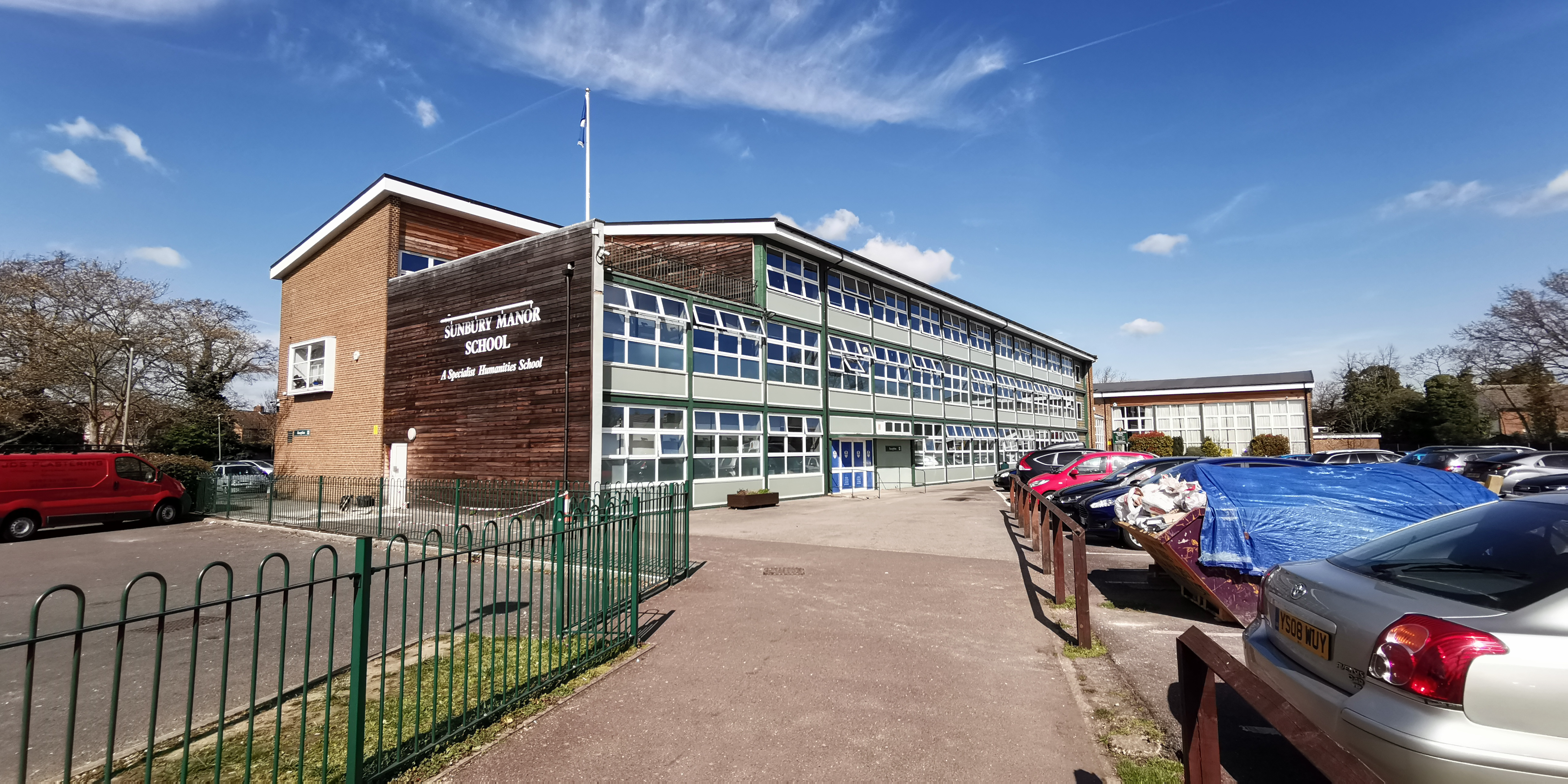

Location
- Nursery Road; Sunbury-on-Thames, Surrey, TW16 6LF; England; 51°24′54″N 0°25′16″W

Information
- Type: Academy
- Established: 1956
- Founder: Middlesex County Council
- Local authority: Surrey County Council
- Department for Education URN: 136529 Tables
- Ofsted: Reports
- Headteacher: David Lee
- Gender: Mixed
- Age: 11 to 16
- Enrolment: 815 (down from 1190)
- Website: www.sunburymanor.surrey.sch.uk

Sunbury Manor School is a secondary academy school in Sunbury-on-Thames, Surrey, England whose effectiveness was reported by Ofsted in 2024 as being inadequate.

== Admissions ==
The school educates children within its catchment area. Pupils are between 11 and 16 year old (i.e. in school years 7 to 11). The acting headteacher was Allan Cottle (took over from Michelle Prentice in February 2024) at the time of the Ofsted inspection report in 2024 which described the school's overall effectiveness as inadequate. The school is conjoined with Sunbury Leisure Centre and makes use of the centre's resources. Sunbury Manor has been designated a Specialist Humanities College, with specialisms in English, History and Geography.

== Location ==
The school is a few hundred metres south-west of junction one of the M3; the same, south, of the Shepperton Branch Line, with pavements to Upper Halliford and Sunbury stations; and somewhat less, west, of the 216 and 235 bus routes.

== History ==
=== Site dedication to public and charitable use ===
This site was a quite productive smallholding (in medieval times of the locally great manor fields) in which sat a rather large house by the 1870s. In 1881 this house, as Mount Pleasant, which had earlier been a private school, was bought by the Good Templars and Temperance (educational) Orphanage - a time in the height of Victorian Britain when purchase by a broad range of well-benefacted charities became possible. It took earlier premises in 1874 for the children of total abstainers of alcohol. It educated usually about 30-40 pupils. The site was to be named (by 1894 and thereafter) Marion Park, featuring a long rectangular pond to its east. The orphanage became conspicuously under-used after the passage of de-institutionalising legislation, discouraging institutions in favour of foster care in the United Kingdom and adoption, in the early 20th century; given how local population and housing had grown as industry and commuting expanded. Those children and warders/carers who remained were evacuated during World War II and was afterwards moved elsewhere. The county council bought the property in 1952 and transformed the site via a new set of buildings into a conventional school.

=== Previous school governing regimes ===
The school is indirect successor to the Sunbury County Grammar School, which opened in 1956 on the site with 150 boys and girls, administered by Middlesex County Council Educational Committee then (from 1965) the Northern Surrey Divisional Executive of Surrey Education Committee. The intermediate existence was as Sunbury County Secondary School, which accepted ages 12–16.

== Wimbledon ==
Pupils from Sunbury Manor School have been representing the school as ball boys and girls at The Championships, Wimbledon and the All England Lawn Tennis and Croquet Club for the past 10 years. From January to June pupils from year 10 attend selection trials, before undergoing rigorous training in the school and at Wimbledon. Several ball boys and girls were invited to be part of the Guard of Honour after the Men's and Ladies' Finals.

== Former pupils ==
=== Sunbury County Grammar School ===
- Brian Capron, actor noted for Coronation Street
- Anthony Head, actor noted for Buffy the Vampire Slayer

=== Sunbury Manor School ===
- Mike Bishay, professional Rugby player (Note: Career has included: London Skolars)
- James Lang, professional rugby player (Note: Career including: Harlequins RFC and Scotland)
- Kerry Norton, actress and singer
