= M. J. Sullivan =

American writer

M. J. Sullivan (born March 1, 1960) is an American author and sports writer living in New York City.

== Biography ==
Sullivan graduated from St. John's University in 1983 and moved into sports journalism, hosting sports radio shows on WGBB on Long Island, NY, and WEVD 1050AM in New York City, as well as work with ESPN, Sporting News and Fox-owned Scout.com.

Sullivan has written a number of children sports books published by Enslow Publishers, including biographies on Shaquille O'Neal, Chris Mullin, Darryl Strawberry, Barry Bonds, and Mark Messier. He also published a book of trivia, So You Think You're A New Yorker.

In fall 2008, Sullivan's first novel, Necessary Heartbreak, from his When Time Forgets series, was published. Centered on a single dad in modern-day New York struggling to raise his feisty 13-year-old daughter, the story explores the concepts of faith and redemption. When the main characters discover a portal leading back in time to first-century Jerusalem during the tumultuous last week of Christ's life, they must encounter their present fears, such as a menacing soldier determined to prey upon the teenage girl, as well as their complicated and broken pasts.

== Published works ==
=== When Time Forgets Series ===
- Necessary Heartbreak (ISBN 978-0595506408)
- A Timely Death (September 2009)
- The Manger (October 2010)

=== Trivia ===
- So You Think You're a New Yorker (ISBN 978-1557700513)

=== Children's Sports Biographies ===
- The New York Rangers Hockey Team (Great Sports Teams) (ISBN 978-0766010239)
- Top 10 Baseball Pitchers (ISBN 0894905201)
- Sports Great Shaquille O'Neal (Sports Great Books) (ISBN 978-0766010031)
- Mark Messier: Star Center (Sports Reports) (ISBN 978-0894908019)
- Sports Great Barry Bonds (Sports Great Books) (ISBN 978-0894905957)
- Chris Mullin: Star Forward (Sport Reports) (ISBN 978-0894904868)
- Sports Great Darryl Strawberry (Sports Great Books) (ISBN 978-0894902918)

=== Children's Action Series ===
- Ultimate Adventures New Digidestined, Vol. 2 (ISBN 978-0061072062)
