= Soldier from Tomorrow =

Short story by Harlan Ellison

"Soldier from Tomorrow" (later reprinted under the title "Soldier") is a 1957 science fiction short story by Harlan Ellison, originally published in Fantastic Universe in October 1957. Its protagonist is Qarlo Clobregnny, a soldier from thousands of years in the future, who has been conditioned from birth by the State (the "Tri-Continenters") solely to fight and kill the enemy (the "Ruskie-Chinks"). After time traveling to the present, Qarlo is "civilized" by Lyle Sims, a government agent, and Soames, a philologist, and eventually goes on a lecture tour to warn of the coming armageddon. Ellison loosely adapted the story for his script for the 1964 The Outer Limits episode "Soldier".

The story was adapted without authorization by Bill Mantlo in The Incredible Hulk #286 (1983). Ellison and Marvel Comics settled the problem for the amount Mantlo had been paid, a credit correction, and a subscription to everything Marvel published.

Ellison later brought suit against The Terminator production company Hemdale and distributor Orion Pictures for plagiarism of his works. The parties settled the lawsuit for an undisclosed amount and an acknowledgement of Ellison's works in the credits of The Terminator.

== See also ==
- List of sources for anthology series
