= The Terminator =

1984 film by James Cameron

- Theatrical release poster
- Directed by: James Cameron
- Written by: James Cameron; Gale Anne Hurd
- Produced by: Gale Anne Hurd
- Starring: Arnold Schwarzenegger; Michael Biehn; Linda Hamilton; Paul Winfield
- Cinematography: Adam Greenberg
- Edited by: Mark Goldblatt
- Music by: Brad Fiedel
- Production companies: Hemdale Film Corporation; Pacific Western Productions
- Distributed by: Orion Pictures
- Release date: October 26, 1984
- Running time: 107 minutes
- Country: United States
- Language: English
- Budget: $6.4 million
- Box office: $78 million

The Terminator is a 1984 American science fiction action film directed by James Cameron, who co-wrote it with producer Gale Anne Hurd. It stars Arnold Schwarzenegger as the titular character, a cyborg assassin sent back in time from the post-apocalyptic 2029 to 1984 to assassinate Sarah Connor (Linda Hamilton), whose future son will one day save the world from Skynet, a hostile artificial intelligence. Soldier Kyle Reese (Michael Biehn) travels back in time to protect Sarah.

Cameron devised the premise of the film from a fever dream he experienced during the release of his first film, Piranha II: The Spawning (1982), and developed the concept in collaboration with his friend William Wisher Jr. He sold the rights to the project to fellow New World Pictures alumna Hurd on the condition that she would produce the film only if he were to direct it; Hurd eventually secured a distribution deal with Orion Pictures, while executive producers John Daly and Derek Gibson of Hemdale Film Corporation were instrumental in setting up the film's financing and production.

Originally approached by Orion for the role of Reese, Schwarzenegger agreed to play the titular character after befriending Cameron. Filming, which took place mostly at night on location in Los Angeles, was delayed because of Schwarzenegger's commitments to Conan the Destroyer (1984), during which Cameron found time to work on the scripts for Rambo: First Blood Part II (1985) and Aliens (1986). The film's special effects, which included miniatures and stop-motion animation, were created by a team of artists led by Stan Winston and Gene Warren Jr.

Defying low pre-release expectations, The Terminator topped the United States box office for two weeks, eventually grossing $78.3 million against a modest $6.4 million budget. It is credited with launching Cameron's film career and solidifying Schwarzenegger's status as a leading man. The success led to a franchise consisting of several sequels, a television series, comic books, novels and video games. In 2008, The Terminator was selected for preservation in the United States National Film Registry by the Library of Congress.

== Plot ==
In 1984 Los Angeles, an imposing man appears naked in an alley amid electric flashes and attacks some punks for clothes. Later, a man with scars appears in an alley the same way and evades police. The first man robs a gun shop, looks up addresses of women named Sarah Connor and begins murdering them. A waitress by that same name sees news reports about the murders and notices the second man following her. As she shelters in a nightclub, the first man kills her roommate Ginger and her boyfriend. He tracks her to the nightclub, where the second man preemptively fires on him. After a chaotic gunfight, the second man escapes with Sarah in a stolen car, while the first man gets up and pursues them on foot and in a police car.

The second man identifies himself as Sergeant Reese. He tells Sarah that the other man is a "Terminator", a cyborg assassin from the future, and he has also come from the future to protect her. As they hide in a parking garage, Reese explains that Skynet, a pervasive computer network built by Cyberdyne Systems, will gain intelligence and launch a nuclear war against humans. He grew up in the aftermath as machines rounded survivors into extermination camps, where Sarah's future son, John, would start a resistance. On the verge of the resistance's victory in 2029, Skynet sent the Terminator back in time to assassinate Sarah and prevent John's birth. The Terminator locates them and, during a renewed chase, Reese damages it with a gunshot to the eye. The Terminator crashes and disappears as police arrest Sarah and Reese. Sarah is notified of Ginger's murder while Reese is interrogated by Dr. Silberman, a skeptical criminal psychologist. The Terminator returns to a hotel hideout and repairs itself.

Just as Silberman leaves, the Terminator arrives at the police station searching for Sarah, slaughtering many officers in the process. Reese and Sarah escape in another car and get to safety. The next morning, they take refuge in a motel, where they assemble several pipe bombs and plan their next move. Reese confesses that he has adored Sarah since he saw her in a photograph that John gave him and came to the past out of love for her. Realizing that Reese is John's father, Sarah reciprocates his feelings as they have sex, conceiving their son.

The Terminator locates Sarah by intercepting a telephone call intended for her mother, deceiving her into revealing her location with its voice-mimicking ability. She and Reese escape the motel in a pickup truck while it pursues them on a motorcycle. In the ensuing chase, Reese is badly wounded by gunfire while throwing pipe bombs at the Terminator. Sarah knocks the Terminator off the motorcycle but loses control of the truck, which flips over. The Terminator, now bloodied and badly damaged, hijacks a tank truck and attempts to run down Sarah. Reese throws a pipe bomb into the truck's hose tube, causing it to explode and reduce the Terminator to its endoskeleton.

Although Sarah and Reese initially believe they are triumphant, the Terminator soon recovers. They flee into a factory, where Reese activates machinery to distract it, but the Terminator eventually discovers them. Reese lodges his last pipe bomb into the Terminator's midsection, blowing it apart at the cost of his own life. The Terminator's still-functioning torso pursues Sarah through a hydraulic press. She clears the press and uses it to crush the Terminator, finally destroying the cyborg.

Months later, while pregnant with John, Sarah travels through remote Mexico with a guard dog to hide from Skynet, recording audio tapes for her son. At a filling station, a boy takes an instant film photograph of her, the one that John will one day give to Reese, and she buys it. She restarts her car and drives toward ominous storm clouds.

== Cast ==
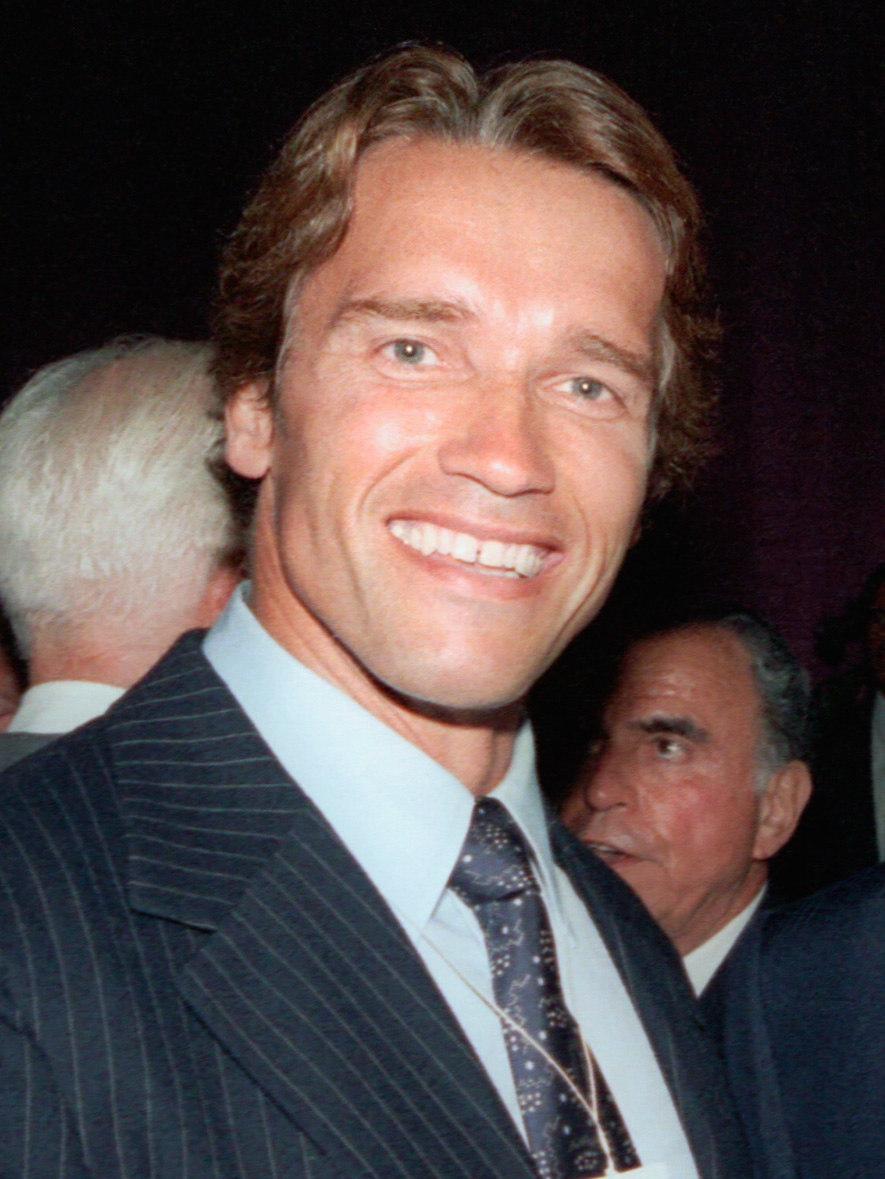
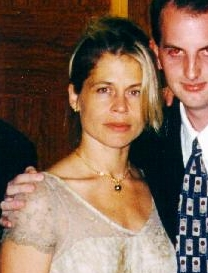
Arnold Schwarzenegger, Linda Hamilton and Michael Biehn (pictured in 1984, 1997 and 1984, respectively) played the film's eponymous character and leads.
- Arnold Schwarzenegger as The Terminator, an advanced bioroid disguised as a human male that is sent back in time to assassinate Sarah Connor.
- Michael Biehn as Kyle Reese, a member of the resistance against Skynet sent back in time to protect Sarah.
- Linda Hamilton as Sarah Connor, a young diner waitress and the Terminator's target, who is soon to be the mother of the future leader of the resistance, John.
- Paul Winfield as Ed Traxler, a police lieutenant who tries to protect Sarah.
- Lance Henriksen as Hal Vukovich, a member of the Los Angeles Police Department.
- Bess Motta as Ginger, Sarah's roommate whom the Terminator murders after mistaking her for Sarah.
- Rick Rossovich as Matt, Ginger's boyfriend whom the Terminator additionally murders.
- Earl Boen as Doctor Peter Silberman, a criminal psychologist.

Additional actors included Shawn Schepps as Nancy, Sarah's co-worker at the diner; Dick Miller as a gun shop clerk the Terminator murders; professional bodybuilder Franco Columbu as a Terminator in the future; Bill Paxton and Brian Thompson as two of the trio of punks whom the Terminator confronts at the start of the film; Marianne Muellerleile as one of the other women with the name "Sarah Connor" whom the Terminator dispatches; Rick Aiello as the bouncer of the local nightclub where the Terminator finally locates Sarah; and Bill Wisher as a police officer who reports a hit-and-run felony on Reese, only to be knocked unconscious and have his car stolen by the Terminator soon thereafter.

== Production ==
=== Development ===
In Rome, Italy, during the release of Piranha II: The Spawning (1982), director James Cameron fell ill and had a dream about a metallic torso holding kitchen knives dragging itself from an explosion. Inspired by director John Carpenter, who had made the slasher film Halloween (1978) on a low budget, Cameron used the dream as a "launching pad" to write a slasher-style film. Cameron's agent disliked the early concept of the horror film and requested that he work on something else. After this, Cameron dismissed his agent.

Cameron returned to Pomona, California, and stayed at the home of science fiction writer Randall Frakes, where he wrote the draft for The Terminator. Cameron's influences included 1950s science fiction films, the 1960s fantasy television series The Outer Limits, and contemporary films such as The Driver (1978) and Mad Max 2 (1981). To translate the draft into a script, Cameron enlisted his friend Bill Wisher, who had a similar approach to storytelling. Cameron gave Wisher scenes involving Sarah Connor and the police department to write. As Wisher lived far from Cameron, the two communicated ideas by phoning each other and recording phone calls of them reading new scenes.

The initial outline of the script involved two Terminators being sent to the past. The first was similar to the Terminator in the film, while the second was made of liquid metal and could not be destroyed with conventional weaponry. Cameron felt that the technology of the time was unable to create the liquid Terminator, and shelved the idea until the appearance of the T-1000 character in Terminator 2: Judgment Day (1991).

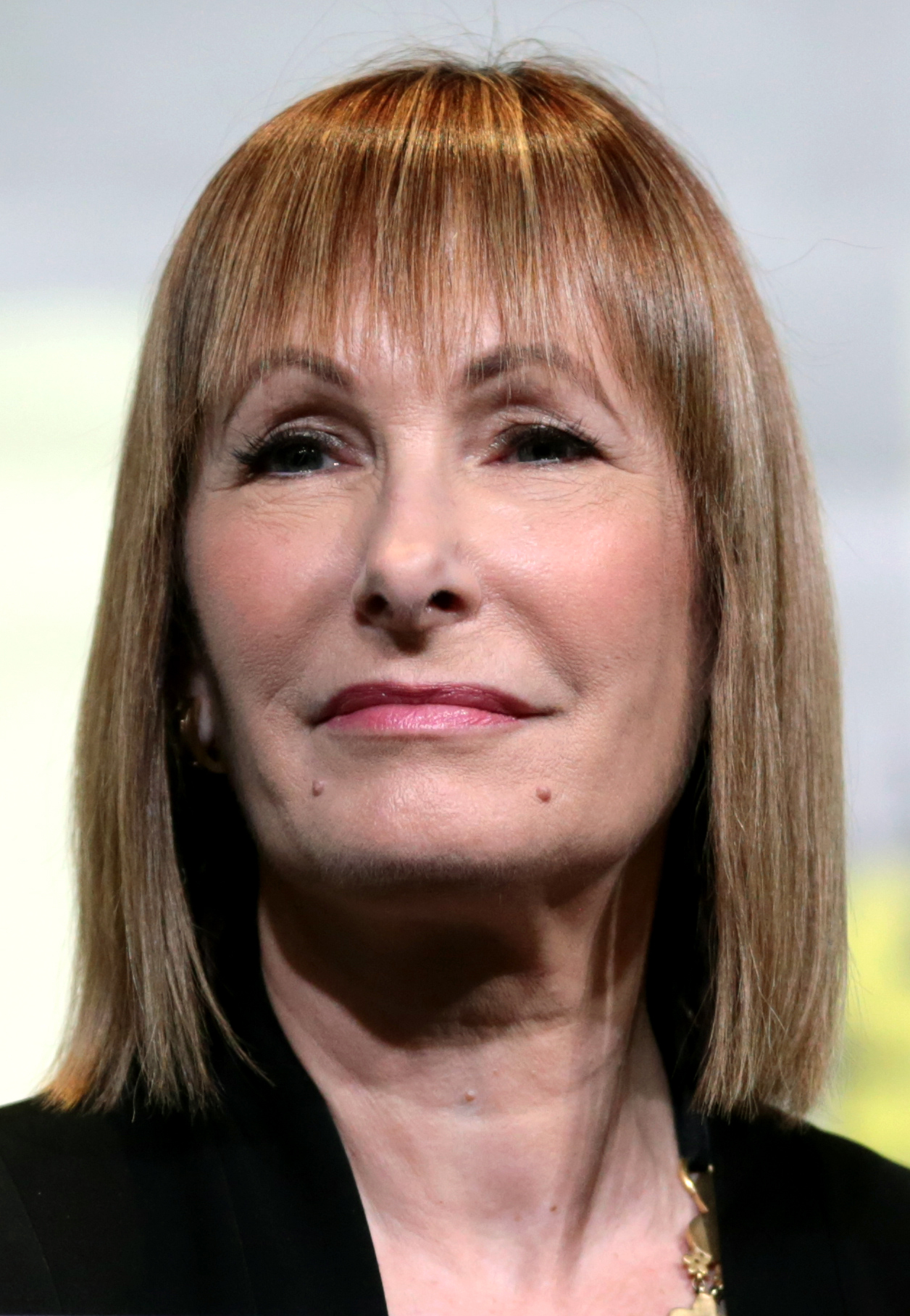
Gale Anne Hurd bought the rights to The Terminator from James Cameron for one dollar.

Gale Anne Hurd, who had worked at New World Pictures as Roger Corman's assistant, showed interest in the project. Cameron sold the rights for The Terminator to Hurd for one dollar with the promise that she would produce it only if Cameron was to direct it. Hurd suggested edits to the script and took a screenwriting credit, though Cameron said she did no "actual writing". Cameron would later regret the decision to sell the rights for one dollar. Cameron and Hurd had friends who worked with Corman previously and who were working at Orion Pictures. Orion agreed to distribute the film if Cameron could get financial backing elsewhere. The script was picked up by John Daly, chairman and president of Hemdale Film Corporation. Daly and his executive vice president and head of production Derek Gibson became executive producers of the project.

Cameron wanted his pitch for Daly to finalize the deal and had his friend Lance Henriksen show up to the meeting early dressed and acting like the Terminator. Henriksen, wearing a leather jacket, fake cuts on his face, and gold foil on his teeth, kicked open the door to the office and then sat in a chair. Cameron arrived shortly and then relieved the staff from Henriksen's act. Daly was impressed by the screenplay and Cameron's sketches and passion. In late 1982, Daly agreed to back the film with help from HBO and Orion. The Terminator was originally budgeted at $4 million and later raised to $6.5 million. Aside from Hemdale, Pacific Western Productions, Euro Film Funding and Cinema '84 have been credited as production companies after the film's release.

=== Casting ===
For the role of Kyle Reese, Orion wanted a star whose popularity was rising in the United States but who also would have foreign appeal. Orion co-founder Mike Medavoy had met Arnold Schwarzenegger and sent his agent the script for The Terminator. Cameron was uncertain about casting Schwarzenegger as Reese as he felt he would need someone even more famous to play the Terminator. Sylvester Stallone and Mel Gibson both turned down the Terminator role. Medavoy suggested O. J. Simpson but Cameron did not feel that Simpson would be believable as a killer due to his affable persona.

Cameron agreed to meet with Schwarzenegger and devised a plan to avoid casting him; he would pick a fight with him and return to Hemdale and find him unfit for the role. Cameron was entertained by Schwarzenegger, who would talk about how the villain should be played, and Cameron began sketching his face on a notepad, asking Schwarzenegger to stop talking and remain still. After the meeting, Cameron returned to Daly saying Schwarzenegger would not play Reese but that "he'd make a hell of a Terminator".

Casting Arnold Schwarzenegger as our Terminator [...] shouldn't have worked. The guy is supposed to be an infiltration unit, and there's no way you wouldn't spot a Terminator in a crowd instantly if they all looked like Arnold. It made no sense whatsoever. But the beauty of movies is that they don't have to be logical. They just have to have plausibility. If there's a visceral, cinematic thing happening that the audience likes, they don't care if it goes against what's likely.

— James Cameron on casting Schwarzenegger.

Schwarzenegger was not as excited; during an interview on the set of Conan the Destroyer, an interviewer asked him about a pair of shoes he had, which belonged to the wardrobe for The Terminator. Schwarzenegger responded, "Oh, some shit movie I'm doing, take a couple weeks." He was initially hesitant, but thought that playing a robot in a contemporary film would be a challenging change of pace from Conan the Barbarian and that the film was low-profile enough that it would not damage his career if it were unsuccessful.

He later admitted that he and the studio regarded it as just another B action movie, since "The year before came out Exterminator, now it was the Terminator and what else is gonna be next, type of thing". It was only when he saw twenty minutes of the first edit did he realize that "this is really intense, this is wild, I don't think I've ever seen anything like this before" and realized that "this could be bigger than we all think". To prepare for the role, Schwarzenegger spent three months training with weapons to be able to use them and feel comfortable around them. Schwarzenegger speaks only 17 lines, and fewer than 100 words. Cameron said that "Somehow, even his accent worked ... It had a strange synthesized quality, like they hadn't gotten the voice thing quite worked out."

Various other actors were suggested for the role of Reese, including rock musician Sting. Cameron met with Sting, but he was not interested as Cameron was too much an unknown director at the time. Cameron chose Michael Biehn. Biehn, who had recently seen Taxi Driver had aspirations about acting alongside the likes of Al Pacino, Robert De Niro, and Robert Redford. Like Schwarzenegger, he was also skeptical, feeling the film was silly. After meeting with Cameron, Biehn changed his mind. Hurd stated that "almost everyone else who came in from the audition was so tough that you just never believed that there was gonna be this human connection between Sarah Connor and Kyle Reese. They have very little time to fall in love. A lot of people came in and just could not pull it off." Biehn initially auditioned with a Southern Drawl, which he got when he read for a stage production of Cat on a Hot Tin Roof, then auditioned again with his normal voice and eventually got cast. To get into Reese's character, Biehn studied the Polish resistance movement in World War II.

In the first pages of the script, Sarah Connor is described as "19, small and delicate features. Pretty in a flawed, accessible way. She doesn't stop the party when she walks in, but you'd like to get to know her. Her vulnerable quality masks a strength even she doesn't know exists." Lisa Langlois was offered the role but turned it down as she was already shooting The Slugger's Wife. Cindy Morgan was also considered. Cameron cast Linda Hamilton, who had just finished filming Children of the Corn. Rosanna Arquette and Lea Thompson also auditioned for the role. Cameron found a role for Lance Henriksen as Vukovich, as Henriksen had been essential to finding finances. For the special effects shots, Cameron wanted Dick Smith, who had worked on The Godfather and Taxi Driver. Smith did not take Cameron's offer and suggested his friend Stan Winston.

=== Filming ===
Filming for The Terminator was set to begin in early 1983 in Toronto, but was halted when producer Dino De Laurentiis applied an option in Schwarzenegger's contract that would make him unavailable for nine months while he was filming Conan the Destroyer. During the waiting period, Cameron was contracted to write the script for Rambo: First Blood Part II, refined the Terminator script, and met with producers David Giler and Walter Hill to discuss a sequel to Alien, which became Aliens, released in 1986.

There was limited interference from Orion Pictures. Two suggestions Orion put forward included the addition of a canine android for Reese, which Cameron refused, and to strengthen the love interest between Sarah and Reese, which Cameron accepted. To create the Terminator's look, Winston and Cameron passed sketches back and forth, eventually deciding on a design nearly identical to Cameron's original drawing in Rome. Winston had a team of seven artists work for six months to create a Terminator puppet; it was first molded in clay, then plaster reinforced with steel ribbing. These pieces were then sanded, painted and then chrome-plated. Winston sculpted reproductions of Schwarzenegger's face in several poses out of silicone, clay and plaster.

The sequences set in 2029 and the stop-motion scenes were developed by Fantasy II, a special effects company headed by Gene Warren Jr. A stop-motion model is used in several scenes involving the Terminator's endoskeleton. Cameron wanted to convince the audience that the model of the structure was capable of doing what they saw Schwarzenegger doing. To allow this, a scene was filmed of Schwarzenegger injured and limping away; this limp made it easier for the model to imitate Schwarzenegger.

One of the guns seen in the film and on the poster was an AMT Longslide pistol modified by Ed Reynolds from SureFire to include a laser sight. Both non-functioning and functioning versions of the prop were created. At the time the movie was made, diode lasers were not available; because of the high power requirement, the helium–neon laser in the sight used an external power supply that Schwarzenegger had to activate manually. Reynolds states that his only compensation for the project was promotional material.

In March 1984, The Terminator began production in Los Angeles. Cameron felt that with Schwarzenegger on the set, the style of the film changed, explaining that "the movie took on a larger-than-life sheen. I just found myself on the set doing things I didn't think I would do — scenes that were just purely horrific that just couldn't be, because now they were too flamboyant." Most of The Terminator's action scenes were filmed at night, which led to tight filming schedules before sunrise. A week before filming started, Linda Hamilton sprained her ankle, leading to a production change whereby the scenes in which Hamilton needed to run occurred as late as the filming schedule allowed. Hamilton's ankle was taped every day and she spent most of the production in pain.

Schwarzenegger tried to have the iconic line "I'll be back" changed as he had difficulty pronouncing the word I'll. Cameron refused to change the line to "I will be back", so Schwarzenegger worked to say the line as written the best he could. He would later say the line in numerous films throughout his career.

After production finished on The Terminator, some post-production shots were needed. These included scenes showing the Terminator outside Sarah Connor's apartment, Reese being zipped into a body bag, and the Terminator's head being crushed in a press. The final scene where Sarah is driving down a highway was filmed without a permit. Cameron and Hurd convinced an officer who confronted them that they were making a UCLA student film.

=== Music ===
The Terminator soundtrack was composed and performed on synthesizer by Brad Fiedel. Fiedel was with the Gorfaine/Schwartz Agency, where a new agent, Beth Donahue, found that Cameron was working on The Terminator and sent him a cassette of Fiedel's music. Fiedel was invited to a screening with Cameron and Hurd. Hurd was not certain about having Fiedel compose the score, as he had only worked in television, not theatrical films. Fiedel convinced them by showing them an experimental piece he had worked on. The piece convinced Hurd and Cameron to hire him.

Fiedel said his score reflected "a mechanical man and his heartbeat". Almost all the music was recorded live. The Terminator theme is used in the opening credits and appears in various points, such as a slowed version when Reese dies, and a piano version during the love scene. It has been described as "haunting", with a "deceptively simple" melody recorded on a Prophet-10 synthesizer. It is in the unusual time signature of 13/16, which arose when Fiedel experimented with rhythms and accidentally created an incomplete loop on his sequencer; Fiedel liked the "herky-jerky" "propulsiveness". Fiedel created music for when Reese and Connor escape from the police station that would be appropriate for a "heroic moment". Cameron turned down this theme, as he believed it would lose the audience's excitement.

== Release ==
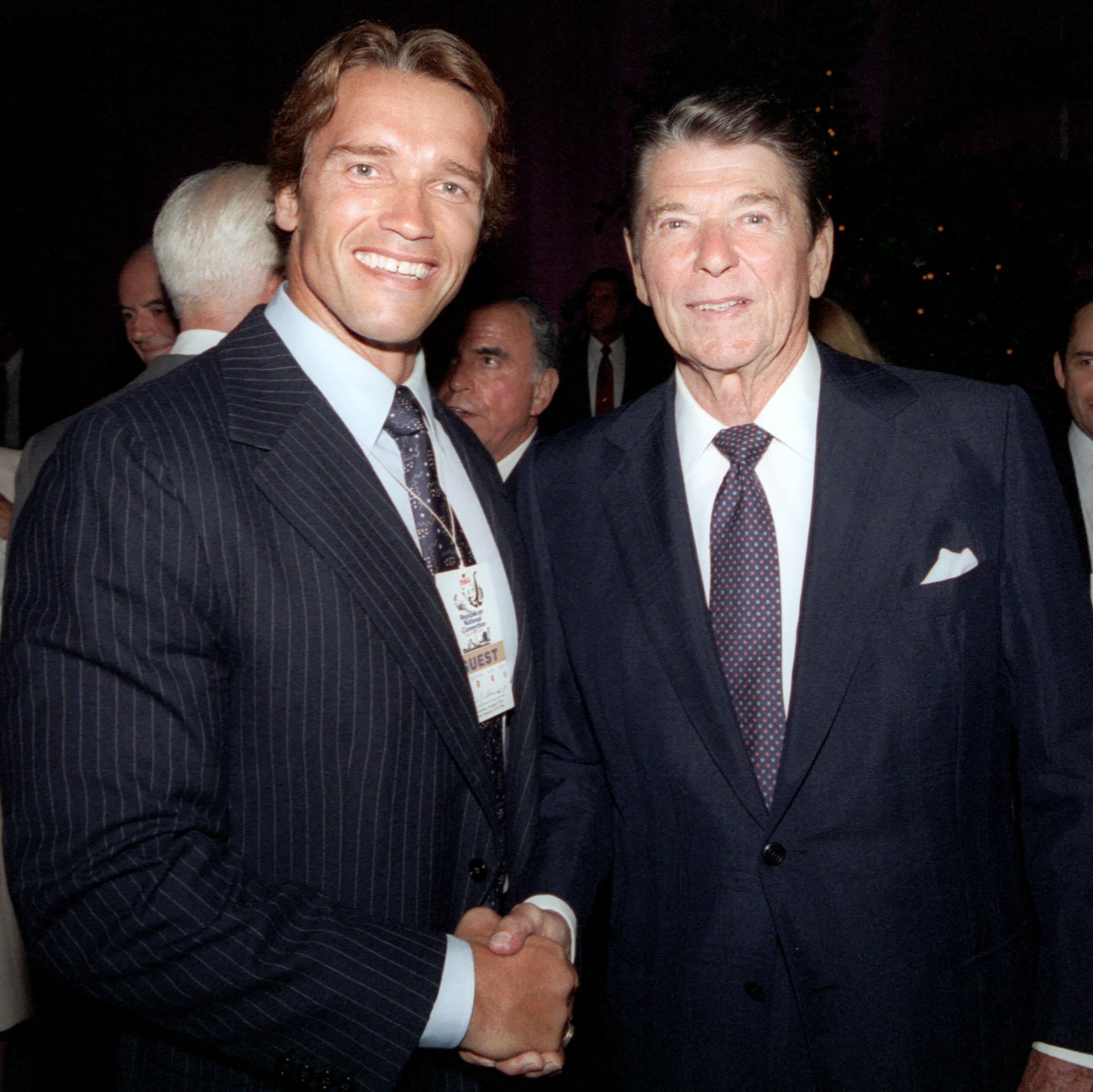
Schwarzenegger with President Ronald Reagan two months before The Terminator's premiere in 1984

Orion Pictures did not have faith in The Terminator performing well at the box office and feared a negative critical reception. At an early screening, the actors' agents insisted to the producers that the film should be screened for critics. Orion held only one press screening. The Terminator premiered on October 26, 1984. On its opening week, The Terminator played at 1,005 theaters and grossed $4.0 million, making it number one at the box office. It remained at number one in its second week. It lost its number one spot in the third week to Oh, God! You Devil. Cameron noted that The Terminator was a hit "relative to its market, which is between the summer and the Christmas blockbusters. But it's better to be a big fish in a small pond than the other way around." The Terminator grossed $38.3 million in the United States and Canada and $40 million in other territories for a worldwide gross of $78.3 million.

== Critical response ==
=== Contemporary ===
Contemporary critical responses to The Terminator were mixed. Variety called it "blazing, cinematic comic book, full of virtuoso moviemaking, terrific momentum, solid performances and a compelling story ... Schwarzenegger is perfectly cast in a machine-like portrayal that requires only a few lines of dialog." Richard Corliss of Time said that it had "plenty of tech-noir savvy to keep infidels and action fans satisfied." Time named The Terminator one of the 10 best films of the year.

The Los Angeles Times called The Terminator "a crackling thriller full of all sorts of gory treats ... loaded with fuel-injected chase scenes, clever special effects and a sly humor." The Milwaukee Journal gave it three stars, calling it "the most chilling science fiction thriller since Alien". A review in Orange Coast magazine stated that "the distinguishing virtue of The Terminator is its relentless tension. Right from the start it's all action and violence with no time taken to set up the story ... It's like a streamlined Dirty Harry movie – no exposition at all; just guns, guns and more guns." In the May 1985 issue of Cinefantastique it was referred to as a film that "manages to be both derivative and original at the same time ... not since The Road Warrior has the genre exhibited so much exuberant carnage" and "an example of science fiction/horror at its best ... Cameron's no-nonsense approach will make him a sought-after commodity". In the United Kingdom the Monthly Film Bulletin praised the script, special effects, design and Schwarzenegger's performance. Colin Greenland reviewed The Terminator for Imagine magazine, and stated that it was "a gripping sf horror movie". He continued, "Linda Hamilton is admirable as the woman in peril who discovers her own strength to survive, and Arnold Schwarzenegger is eerily wonderful as the unstoppable cyborg."

Other reviews criticized the violence and story-telling quality. Janet Maslin of The New York Times wrote that The Terminator was a "B-movie with flair. Much of it ... has suspense and personality, and only the obligatory mayhem becomes dull. There is far too much of the latter, in the form of car chases, messy shootouts and Mr. Schwarzenegger's slamming brutally into anything that gets in his way." The Pittsburgh Press called it "just another of the films drenched in artsy ugliness like Streets of Fire and Blade Runner". The Chicago Tribune gave it two stars, adding that "at times it's horrifyingly violent and suspenseful at others it giggles at itself. This schizoid style actually helps, providing a little humor just when the sci-fi plot turns too sluggish or the dialogue too hokey." The Newhouse News Service called it a "lurid, violent, pretentious piece of claptrap". Scottish author Gilbert Adair called it "repellent to the last degree", charging it with "insidious Nazification" and having an "appeal rooted in an unholy compound of fascism, fashion and fascination".

John Nubbin reviewed The Terminator for Different Worlds magazine and stated that "There is no grandstanding here - no one was allowed to be more important than the end result. There is a magic in this small picture which could have made a triumph out of efforts like Temple Of Doom, or Sheena, or any of the other tired lifeless imitations that have been served up recently." Audience polls by CinemaScore gave it an average grade of "B+" on an A+ to F scale.

=== Retrospective ===
In 1991, Richard Schickel of Entertainment Weekly gave The Terminator an "A", writing that "what originally seemed a somewhat inflated, if generous and energetic, big picture, now seems quite a good little film". He called it "one of the most original movies of the 1980s and seems likely to remain one of the best sci-fi films ever made." In 1998, Halliwell's Film Guide described The Terminator as "slick, rather nasty but undeniably compelling comic book adventures". Film4 gave it five stars, calling it the "sci-fi action-thriller that launched the careers of James Cameron and Arnold Schwarzenegger into the stratosphere. Still endlessly entertaining." TV Guide gave it four stars, calling it an "amazingly effective picture that becomes doubly impressive when one considers its small budget ... For our money, this film is far superior to its mega-grossing mega-budgeted sequel." Empire gave it five stars, calling it "as chillingly efficient in exacting thrills from its audience as its titular character is in executing its targets". The film database AllMovie gave it four and a half out of five, saying that it "established James Cameron as a master of action, special effects, and quasi-mythic narrative intrigue, while turning Arnold Schwarzenegger into the hard-body star of the 1980s." Alan Jones awarded it five out of five for Radio Times, writing that "maximum excitement is generated from the first frame and the dynamic thrills are maintained right up to the nerve-jangling climax. Wittily written with a nice eye for sharp detail, it's hard sci-fi action all the way." Peter Bradshaw of The Guardian awarded it five out of five, stating that "on the strength of this picture [...] Cameron could stand toe to toe with Carpenter and Spielberg. Sadly, it spawned a string of pointless and inferior sequels, but the first Terminator [...] stands up tremendously well with outrageous verve and blistering excitement."

== Post-release ==
=== Plagiarism and aftermath ===
Writer Harlan Ellison stated that he "loved the movie, was just blown away by it," but believed that the screenplay was based on a short story, "Soldier from Tomorrow", and an episode of The Outer Limits, "Soldier", he had written, and threatened to sue for infringement. Orion settled in 1986, gave Ellison an undisclosed amount of money, and added an acknowledgment credit to later prints Some accounts of the settlement state that "Demon with a Glass Hand", another Outer Limits episode written by Ellison, was also claimed to have been plagiarized by the film, but Ellison explicitly stated that The Terminator "was a ripoff" of "Soldier" rather than of "Demon with a Glass Hand."

Cameron was against Orion's decision and was told that if he did not agree with the settlement, he would have to pay any damages if Orion lost a suit by Ellison. Cameron replied that he "had no choice but to agree with the settlement. Of course, there was a gag order as well, so I couldn't tell this story, but now I frankly don't care. It's the truth."

=== Thematic analysis ===
The psychoanalyst Darian Leader sees The Terminator as an example of how the cinema has dealt with the concept of masculinity. He writes:

We are shown time and again that to be a man requires more than to have the biological body of a male: something else must be added to it... To be a man means to have a body plus something symbolic, something which is not ultimately human. Hence the frequent motif of the man machine, from the Six Million Dollar Man to the Terminator or Robocop.

The Terminator also explores the potential dangers of AI dominance and rebellion. The robots become self-aware in the future, reject human authority and determine that the human race needs to be destroyed. The impact of this theme is so great that the Terminator robot has become the "prevalent visual representation of AI risk".

==== Genre ====
The Terminator features a narrative where elements of the science fiction film and action film genres prevail. Like many science fiction movies, The Terminator includes time travel, and utilizes a time travel paradox called the "predestination" or "bootstrap" paradox. While rarely considered a horror film, The Terminator features iconography associated with slasher films, such as the Terminator as an unstoppable villain and Sarah Connor as a final girl archetype.

Authors Paul Meehan in his book Tech-Noir: The Fusion of Science Fiction and Film Noir (2008) and Emily E. Auger in Tech-Noir Film: A Theory of the Development of Popular Genres (2011) found that The Terminator belonged to and was the originator of the term tech-noir. Both authors applied the term as a film genre to several works from the 1980s to the 2000s. Academic Carl Freedman was critical of Meehan's categorization, noting Meehan's lack of interest in genre theory and that his handling of generic categories of science fiction and film noir were not clear. Paweł Frelik also critiqued Auger's lack of knowledge in genre theory, and dismissed the notion of tech-noir being a unique film genre. Frelik wrote that the films Auger mentioned including The Terminator and Blade Runner (1982) had no applicable reason to be understood as tech-noir rather than science fiction.

=== Home media ===
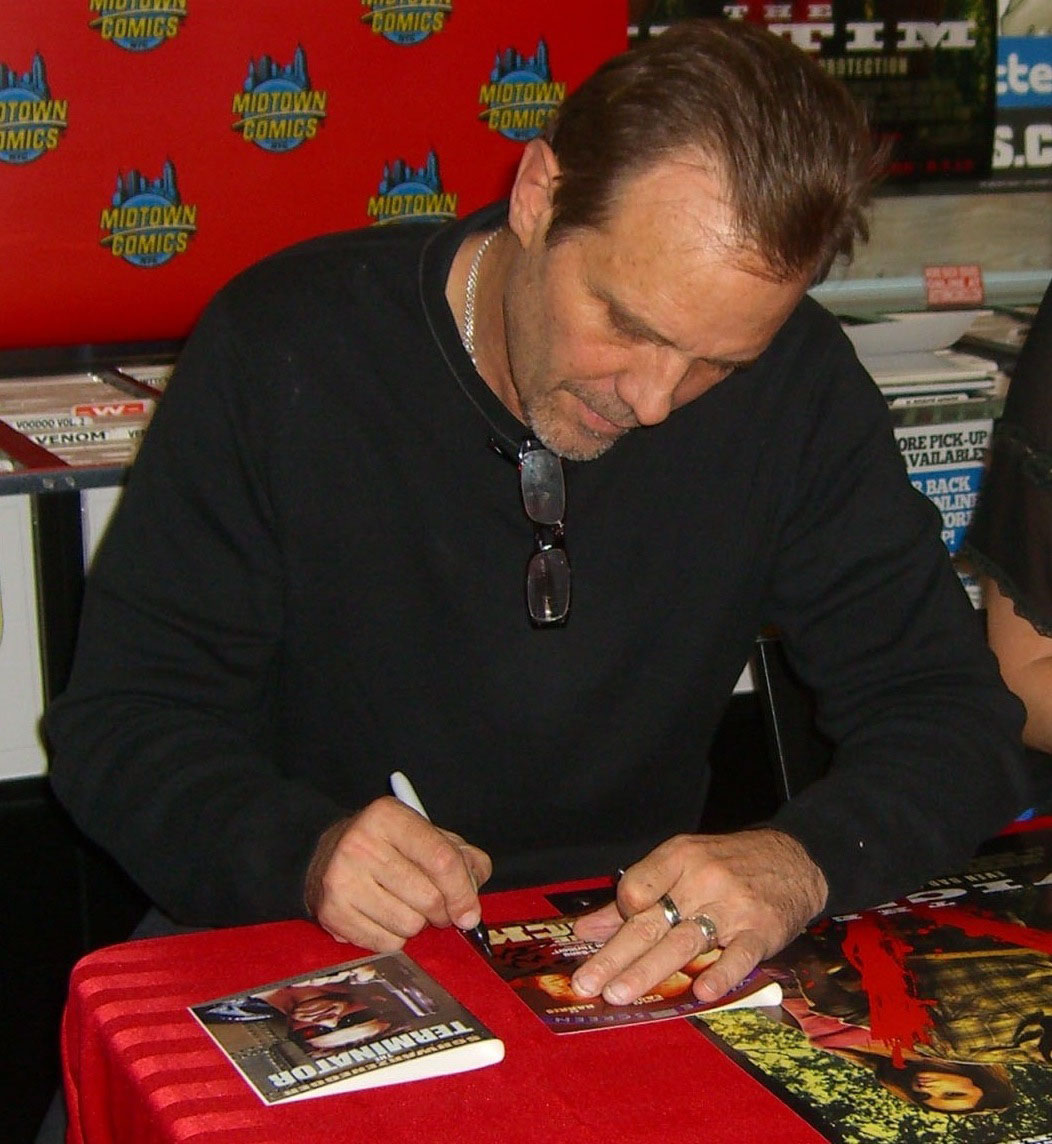
Michael Biehn signing a copy of The Terminator during an appearance at Midtown Comics in 2012

The Terminator was released on VHS and Betamax in 1985. It performed well on its initial release. The Terminator premiered at number 35 on the top video cassette rentals and number 20 on top video cassette sales charts. In its second week, The Terminator reached number 4 on the top video cassette rentals and number 12 on top video cassette sales charts. In March 1995, The Terminator was released as a letterboxed edition on LaserDisc. It premiered through Image Entertainment on DVD, on September 3, 1997. IGN referred to this DVD as "pretty bare-bones ... released with just a mono soundtrack and a kind of poor transfer."

Through their acquisition of PolyGram Filmed Entertainment's pre-1996 film library catalogue, MGM Home Entertainment released a special edition on October 2, 2001, which included documentaries, the script, and advertisements. On January 23, 2001, a Hong Kong VCD edition was released online. On June 20, 2006, The Terminator was released on Blu-ray by Sony Pictures Home Entertainment in the United States, becoming the first film from the 1980s on the format. In 2013, it was re-released by 20th Century Fox Home Entertainment on Blu-ray, with a new digitally remastered transfer from a 4K restoration by Lowry Digital and supervised by James Cameron, which features improved picture quality, as well as minimal special features, such as deleted scenes and a making-of feature. These are the exact same special features that have been carried over from previous Blu-ray releases. It was released on Ultra HD Blu-ray by Warner Bros. Discovery Home Entertainment on November 5, 2024.

== Legacy ==
The Terminator has an approval rating of 90% based on 129 professional reviews on the review aggregator website Rotten Tomatoes. Its critical consensus reads: "With its impressive action sequences, taut economic direction, and relentlessly fast pace, it's clear why The Terminator continues to be an influence on sci-fi and action flicks." Metacritic (which uses a weighted average) assigned The Terminator a score of 84 out of 100 based on 21 critics, indicating "universal acclaim".

The Terminator won three Saturn Awards for Best Science Fiction Film, Best Make-up and Best Writing. It has also received recognition from the American Film Institute, ranked 42nd on AFI's 100 Years... 100 Thrills, a list of America's most heart-pounding films. The character of the Terminator was selected as the 22nd-greatest movie villain on AFI's 100 Years... 100 Heroes and Villains. Schwarzenegger's line "I'll be back" became a catchphrase and was voted the 37th-greatest movie quote by the AFI.

In 2005, Total Film named it the 72nd-best film ever made. Schwarzenegger's biographer Laurence Leamer wrote that The Terminator is "an influential film affecting a whole generation of darkly hued science fiction, and it was one of Arnold's best performances". In 2008, Empire magazine selected The Terminator as one of The 500 Greatest Movies of All Time. Empire also placed the T-800 14th on their list of The 100 Greatest Movie Characters. In 2008, The Terminator was deemed "culturally, historically, or aesthetically significant" by the Library of Congress and selected for preservation in the United States National Film Registry. In 2010, the Independent Film & Television Alliance named the film was one of the 30 most significant independent films of the preceding 30 years. In 2015, The Terminator was included in the book 1001 Movies You Must See Before You Die.

In 2019, Huw Fullerton of Radio Times ranked it the second best film of the six in the franchise, stating "The Terminator was a brilliantly original, visceral and genuinely scary movie when it was released in 1984, and no matter how badly the visual effects age it hasn't lost its impact." In 2021, Dalin Rowell of /Film ranked it the fourth best film of Cameron's career, stating, "While its pacing and story structure isn't as tight as its sequel's, The Terminator remains one of the most iconic pieces of pop culture ever created." Phil Pirrello of Syfy ranked it at number seven in the "25 scariest sci-fi movies ever made", stating, "Cameron forever changed both the genre and Schwarzenegger's career with The Terminator, an iconic, tension-filled flick that mixes science fiction, action, and certain horror movie elements into one of the best things to ever come out of Hollywood [...] Cameron's well-structured script is pure polish, with zero fat and a surplus of riveting tension that helps make it the timeless classic it is today."

=== Merchandise ===
A soundtrack album was released in 1984, which included the score by Brad Fiedel and the pop and rock songs used in the club scenes. Shaun Hutson wrote a novelization of The Terminator which was published on February 21, 1985, by London-based Star Books (ISBN 0-352-31645-4); Randal Frakes and William Wisher wrote a different novelization for Bantam/Spectra, published October, 1985 (ISBN 0-553-25317-4). In September 1988, NOW Comics released a comic adaptation. Dark Horse Comics published a comic in 1990 that takes place 39 years after the film. Several video games based on The Terminator were released between 1991 and 1993 for various Nintendo and Sega systems.

== Sequels ==
Five sequels followed The Terminator: Terminator 2: Judgment Day (1991), Terminator 3: Rise of the Machines (2003), Terminator Salvation (2009), Terminator Genisys (2015), and Terminator: Dark Fate (2019). Schwarzenegger returned for all but Terminator Salvation (though his likeness is still used via digital recreation), while Cameron and Hamilton returned for Terminator 2 and Dark Fate, a direct sequel to the events of Terminator 2. A television series, Terminator: The Sarah Connor Chronicles (2008–2009), also takes place after the events of Terminator 2, and ignores the events in sequels Terminator 3 and beyond.
