= Brenna O'Brien =

Canadian actress and artist (born 1991)

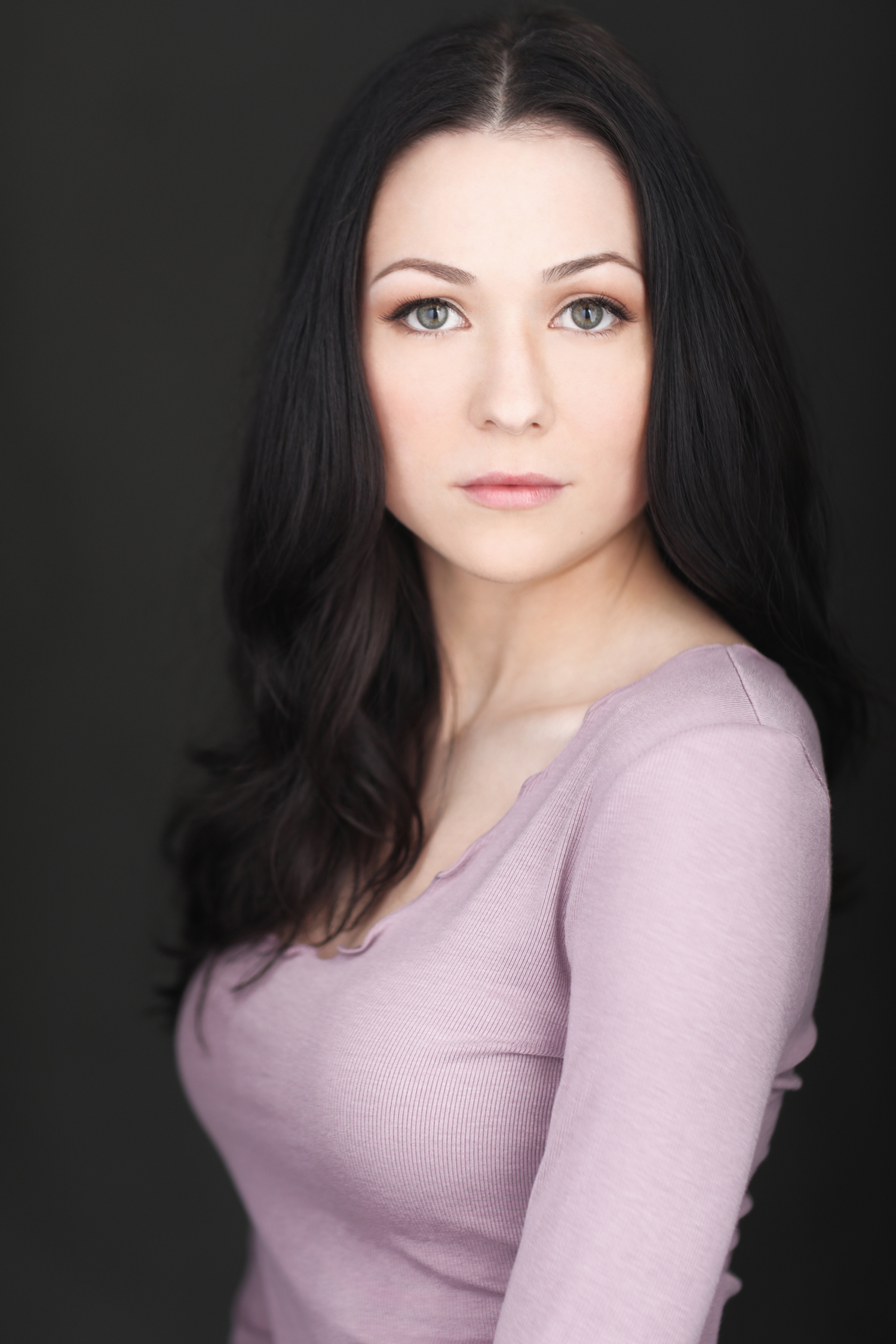
- O'Brien in 2018
- Born: March 9, 1991 (age 35); Brampton, Ontario, Canada
- Occupation: Actress
- Years active: 2001–present
- Website: brennaobrien.net

Brenna O'Brien (born March 9, 1991) is a Canadian actress and artist. She is best known for voicing Rin in the anime series Inuyasha. O'Brien was in the original pilot of The Middle in 2007 also starring Ricki Lake and Atticus Shaffer. This pilot was then re-created in 2009 with the current cast.

== Career ==
O'Brien began her acting career at age 9, performing in local theatre productions and school plays. Her first film role was in Scooby-Doo 2: Monsters Unleashed at the age of 12 and from there went on to guest star in such films and televisions shows such as Supernatural as the NSA demon secretary Cecily, Stargate SG-1, Meghan in Zixx: Level Two, X-Men: The Last Stand, Phantom Racer and Girl in Progress. She is an accomplished voice over actor, having worked as a guest star as well as lead roles in several anime series, including Inuyasha, Hamtaro, Gundam SEED Destiny, and Elemental Gelade. She was a lead voice in Marvel’s animated feature Next Avengers: Heroes of Tomorrow, Marvel series Iron Man: Armored Adventures and Nintendo’s Dragalia Lost.

== Filmography ==
Television
| Year | Title | Role | Notes |
|---|---|---|---|
| 2001–2004 | Inuyasha | Rin (voice) | TV series |
| 2002 | Hamtaro | Mimi (Panda's owner) | TV series |
| 2003 | Dragon Ball Z | Pan | 3 episodes |
| 2003 | Master Keaton | Clara | TV series |
| 2003 | The Dead Zone | Julia Wey | Episode: "Visions" |
| 2004 | Inuyasha: The Secret of the Cursed Mask | Rin (voice) | Video game |
| 2004 | Scooby Doo 2: Monsters Unleashed | Girl Scout | Feature film |
| 2005 | Elemental Gelade | Reverie 'Rev' Metherlence (voice) | 26 episodes |
| 2005 | Zixx: Level Two | Meghan | 13 episodes |
| 2006 | Merlin's Apprentice | Young Brianna | TV miniseries |
| 2006 | Stargate SG-1 | Adria - age 12 | Episode: "Flesh and Blood" |
| 2006 | Alice, I Think | Violet | 3 episodes |
| 2006 | Masters of Horror | Amy | Episode: "The Screwfly Solution" |
| 2006 | X-Men: The Last Stand | Minivan girl | Feature film |
| 2006 | Max Havoc: Ring of Fire | Valentine | TV movie |
| 2007 | The Middle | Sue Heck | TV pilot |
| 2007 | Perfect Child | Older Girl | TV movie |
| 2007 | Tin Man | Ella Bedose | TV miniseries |
| 2007 | Beneath | Christy - 14 years | Feature film |
| 2007–2009 | Zixx: Level Three | Meghan | 13 episodes |
| 2008 | Psych | Heather | Episode: "Talk Derby to Me" |
| 2008 | Gym Teacher: The Movie | Morgan | TV movie |
| 2008 | Next Avengers: Heroes of Tomorrow | Torunn (voice) | Direct-to-video |
| 2008 | Incident at a Truck Stop Diner | Daughter | Short |
| 2009 | Kyle XY | Katie | Episode: "Chemistry 101" |
| 2009 | Knights of Bloodsteel | Talia | TV miniseries |
| 2009 | Phantom Racer | Jesse | TV movie |
| 2009 | Fear Island | Regina Anderson | |
| 2009 | The Troop | Angie | Episode: "There Is No I in Monster Hunter" |
| 2009 | Inuyasha: The Final Act | Rin (voice) | Episode: "Naraku no shinzou" |
| 2010 | Inuyasha: The Final Act | Rin (voice) | Episode: "Ashita e" |
| 2010 | The Troop | Angie | Episode: "Like a Moth to the Spotlight" |
| 2010 | Charlie St. Cloud | Cashier in Toy Store | Feature film |
| 2010 | Life Unexpected | Courtney | Episode: "Camp Grounded" |
| 2011 | Life Unexpected | Courtney | Episode: "Affair Remembered" |
| 2011 | Iron Man: Armored Adventures | Rhona Erwin / Rhona Burchill (voice) | 3 episodes |
| 2011 | R.L. Stine's The Haunting Hour | Samantha | Episode: "Scary Mary: Parts 1 & 2" |
| 2012 | R.L. Stine's The Haunting Hour | Lyria | Episode: "The Intruders" |
| 2012 | 12 Disasters of Christmas | Elizabeth | TV movie, post-production |
| 2012 | Girl in Progress | Valerie | Feature film |
| 2014 | Supernatural | Cecily | Episode: "Road Trip" |
| 2015 | Garage Sale Mystery: The Deadly Room | Tina | TV movie |
| 2017 | Unforgotten | Nurse | Short |
| 2018 | Dragalia Lost | Mitsuhide (English Version) | Video game |
| 2019 | Aurora Teagarden Mysteries: A Very Foul Play | Monica Swanson | TV movie |
| 2020 | Mystery 101: An Education in Murder | Ella Quincy | TV movie |
| 2020 | Yashahime: Princess Half-Demon | Rin | TV series |
