= The Screwfly Solution (Masters of Horror) =

- Masters of Horror episode
- DVD cover for The Screwfly Solution
- Episode no.: Season 2 Episode 7
- Directed by: Joe Dante
- Written by: Sam Hamm
- Production code: 207
- Original air date: December 8, 2006

Guest appearances
- Jason Priestley; Kerry Norton; Linda Darlow; Brenna O'Brien; Steve Lawlor; Elliott Gould

Episode chronology
← Previous "Pelts"	Next → "Valerie on the Stairs"

"The Screwfly Solution" is the seventh episode in the second season of Masters of Horror. It is based upon the 1977 science fiction short story of the same name by Alice Sheldon (under the alias Raccoona Sheldon), credited in the film as James Tiptree, Jr. Many of the scenes in Sam Hamm's script are expansions of single lines in this epistolary story. Director Joe Dante read the story in the 1980s and had wanted to make a film version ever since. He presented the story as straight horror, eschewing his usual humor and without using his usual company of stock actors. Jason Priestley and Elliott Gould star.

== Plot ==
One summer, a rash of femicides breaks out all over the world, which comes to the notice of women's shelter case worker Anne Alstein (Kerry Norton) and her husband Alan (Jason Priestley), who is working alongside Barney (Elliott Gould) on the solution to an insect problem in the rain forest. Their friend, epidemiologist Bella Sartiano (Linda Darlow), leaves for Jacksonville, Florida, where a large amount of femicides took place. She interviews an infected U.S. Army soldier, Private William Holicky (Steve Lawlor), who savagely murdered a stripper at a club. The aggression is linked to sexual arousal, and many of the infected men use extremist religious rhetoric to justify the murders. Bella discovers that tens of thousands of similar murders are happening elsewhere in the world before being attacked and killed by the infected mayor.

Before her death, Bella informed Barney of the epidemic as they were coordinating their findings. Barney and Alan head to Washington D.C. to brief a panel of high-ranking officials on whether the cause of the condition is natural or bioterrorism, concluding that the only way to prevent it is through either a chemical castration shot or surgical castration. The reception is skeptical and indignant; the US Army General on the panel bluntly declares he will oppose this solution, thereby ensuring his troops will turn on female personnel and civilians once they become infected. Barney, who is gay, gets the shot, but Alan refuses, stating he'll be fine with pills, until he begins to have dreams of killing Anne. On the plane ride home, Alan witnesses the murders of two women and realizes that every man on the plane is infected, himself included. He calls his wife and their daughter Amy (Brenna O'Brien) to say goodbye, warning them to head north away from the area where the epidemic is concentrated, arm themselves, and not listen to anything else he says from now on, telling them that he won't be himself by the time he gets back to them.

By September, Anne and Amy have continued northward to Canada, as have other women. While staying at Barney's cabin in the Ontario rainforest, they return to find the infected Alan awaiting them. He lies to Anne about having found a cure for the epidemic. Amy is overjoyed to see him, but Anne sees through Alan's deception, and is horrified when he touches Amy inappropriately as she hugs him. Alan comes after her, and Anne shoots him in the legs. They flee the cabin, but Amy, not grasping the severity of the situation, rebels against her mother, steals their car, and returns to Alan. Anne arrives at the cabin too late to save her, and is implicitly forced to kill Alan.

Anne falls unconscious and wakes up in a hospital, where Barney is waiting by her bedside. He tells her she has been unconscious for three days after he found her at the cabin. Barney helps her disguise herself as a man and smuggles her out of the hospital, where infected men are slaughtering the female patients.

While buying necessities at a general store, the disguised Anne overhears a conversation between two men revealing that the area's female population has been wiped out. It is implied that the adult men are turning on less-masculine boys next, killing them off as well. Trying to survive the harsh winter in a simple tent, Barney soon falls ill. He encourages Anne to survive no matter what, as humankind still has a chance as long as there are surviving women. He dies peacefully that November, and Anne buries him.

The hunters who congregate at the general store see through Anne's disguise and follow her car. She hides in the woods to evade them and stumbles on the cause of the epidemic: luminous extraterrestrial beings that incited the epidemic as a form of biological control (the titular "screwfly solution"). They kill the hunters pursuing Anne, apparently to take some of their brain matter. Anne is last seen outside shivering by a meager fire in a snowstorm.

By December, all female life on Earth is presumed to have been exterminated, leaving the infected men to slowly die off.

== Production ==
When interviewed while shooting the film in Vancouver, director Joe Dante summarized it:

It's vaguely political. It's not political in the same way that 'Homecoming' is. It is about a plague that starts in the southern half of the U.S. and moves around the rest of the world. It is a story in which men are moved to kill all the women. It is extremely dark.

— Joe Dante, Calgary Sun

The film was shot using a digital camera for the first time. The director chose this experimental technique especially to give the film a different look. Jason Priestley explained his interpretation of the motivation of the scientist Alan, stating:

For me, his knowledge and his level of understanding is what drives him as a character, and then his love for his wife and his daughter. That's what ends up giving him the moment of clarity before he figures it out. But, it's a heavy piece. It's a heavy piece for him. I always look for characters and try to play characters that have a turn, that aren't just one note.

— Jason Priestley, UGO

== Release ==
The film was screened at the 24th Turin Film Festival. The DVD was released on June 12, 2007.

== Reception ==
Michael Gingold of Fangoria magazine, awarded the film three skulls for its "stinging mix of sociopolitical commentary and traditional horror mayhem". He saw the political message as a link between religious fervor and misogyny with special reference to Islamic fundamentalism. The effect of violent horror movies upon men within the story was thought to be witty self-reference though the overall tone was considered "deadly serious". The lead actor, Jason Priestley, was thought to have been weaker than the role required while the performances of Kerry Norton, as Alan's wife Anne, and Brenna O'Brien, as her daughter Amy, were thought sympathetic and more effective.

Peter Brown of iF magazine felt that the presentation of the main feature was too rushed and would have been better at 1.5 to 2 hours rather than the 58 minutes allowed by the 1 hour format. Also the denouement was revealed too soon and so suspense was lacking in the second half. He thought that the DVD extras were interesting, providing Joe Dante's account of the conversion from the short story and details of the effects used for the aliens in the story. Overall, his rating for this DVD was C.
