= Sam Hamm =

American screenwriter (born 1955)

- Born: November 19, 1955 (age 70); Charlottesville, Virginia, U.S.
- Occupations: Screenwriter, television producer

Sam Hamm (born November 19, 1955) is an American screenwriter and comic book writer. Hamm is known for writing the initial drafts of the screenplay for Batman (1989) before those duties were handed over to Warren Skaaren. He also received a story credit for Batman Returns, though the final version of the film differs significantly from his ideas.

DC Comics invited Hamm to write for Detective Comics. The result was Batman: Blind Justice, which introduced Bruce Wayne's mentor, Henri Ducard. Hamm's other screen credits include Never Cry Wolf and Monkeybone.

In 2021, Hamm returned to the 1989 Batman film universe with the limited DC Comics series Batman '89, a direct continuation of both the 1989 film and Batman Returns. The series was followed by Batman '89: Echoes.

== Selected filmography ==
Year	Title	Writer	Executive producer
1983	Never Cry Wolf	Yes	No
1989	Batman	Yes	No
1992	Batman Returns	Story	No
1994	M.A.N.T.I.S. (TV series)	Yes	Yes
2001	Monkeybone	Yes	Yes
2003	Haunted Lighthouse (4-D short film)	Yes	No
2005	Masters of Horror: Homecoming (S1E6)	Yes	No
2006	Masters of Horror: The Screwfly Solution (S2E7)	Yes	No
