= Chocolate (Masters of Horror) =

- Masters of Horror episode
- DVD cover
- Episode no.: Season 1 Episode 5
- Directed by: Mick Garris
- Written by: Mick Garris
- Production code: 105
- Original air date: November 25, 2005

Guest appearances
- Matt Frewer; Lucie Laurier; Henry Thomas

Episode chronology
← Previous "Jenifer"	Next → "Homecoming"

"Chocolate" is the fifth episode of the first season of Masters of Horror. It originally aired in North America on November 25, 2005. It was directed by Mick Garris and based on his short story.

== Plot ==
A divorced young man Jamie (Henry Thomas) who develops artificial flavorings begins witnessing and experiencing the sights, smells and sounds of a woman he's never met starting with the taste of chocolate in his mouth. Troubled by these sudden experiences, he soon witnesses the woman murdering her former artist lover by stabbing and slashing his chest. Determined to find his mystery mate, his search leads to Catherine (Lucie Laurier), a beautiful Canadian woman who is suspicious of his actions. They become closer until Catherine attempts to murder him due to the psychological and psychosexual experiences that she also feels and doesn't enjoy the fact someone she doesn't know can feel what she can. In an attempt to save himself, he suddenly sees through Catherine's eyes at the wrong moment, killing her when he randomly shoots her.

The entire episode revolves around Jamie's story of the circumstances to the cops that interrogate him of the events that led to the murder. He states that he "knew what it felt like to die" when Catherine did and that it all happened because his life was so empty and hers was so full.

== Cast ==
- Henry Thomas as Jamie
- Lucie Laurier as Catherine
- Stacy Grant as Vanessa
- Leah Graham as Elaine
- Matt Frewer as Wally

== DVD and Blu-ray ==
The DVD was released by Anchor Bay Entertainment on May 9, 2006. The episode was the fifth episode and the fourth to be released on DVD. The episode appears on the fourth volume of the Blu-ray compilation of the series.

== Sources ==
- Review for Chocolate at Dread Central
- Review for Chocolate at Slant Magazine
