= Esuvee =

ESUVEE was a year-long US consumer education campaign on SUV safety in 2005. There was also an associated website game. The goal of the campaign was to encourage safe driving of SUVs. The campaign emphasized the need to drive carefully to avoid rolling the vehicles over because SUVs handle like trucks, not cars. The focus was changing driver behavior, particularly among younger male drivers.

The campaign was a $27 million effort sponsored by the consumer protection agencies and the Attorneys General of all 50 states, D.C., Puerto Rico and the U.S. Virgin Islands. Part of the funding came from a settlement agreement with the Ford Motor Company to resolve lawsuits alleging that Ford's marketing practices misled consumers on how to drive, load, and maintain the Ford Explorer.

The SUUVEE campaign aimed to inform the public about four safety elements to help save lives:

- Handling - A higher risk of rollover in SUVs because of a higher center of gravity than passenger cars.
- Loading - Number of occupants, as well as the weight and distribution of cargo, raises the center of gravity, thus increasing the risk of rollovers.
- Tires - the size, pressure, and proper maintenance of tires are keys to SUV safety.
- Seat belts - Since 80% of deaths in SUV rollovers were from ejection, seat belt use would help prevent fatalities.
