= Valley of Darkness =

- Battlestar Galactica episode
- "Valley of Darkness" received a Visual Effects Society Award nomination for its animated Cylon Centurions.
- Episode no.: Season 2 Episode 2
- Directed by: Michael Rymer
- Written by: David Weddle; Bradley Thompson
- Original air date: July 22, 2005

Guest appearances
- Sam Witwer as Crashdown; Kate Vernon as Ellen Tigh (Note: Vernon is credited but does not appear in the final cut of the "Valley of Darkness". She appears in deleted scenes included in disc 1 of the season 2.0 DVD.); Alonso Oyarzun as Socinus; Kerry Norton as Paramedic Ishay; Chris Shields as Cpl. Venner; Luciana Carro as Kat; Bodie Olmos as Hot Dog; Jennifer Halley as Seelix; Ty Olsson as Aaron Kelly; Michael Tayles as Flyboy; Dominic Zamprogna as Jammer; Garvin Cross as Collinshaw; Brad Loree as Bonnington; Lori Stewart as Twinam

Episode chronology
← Previous "Scattered"	Next → "Fragged"
- Battlestar Galactica season 2

"Valley of Darkness" is the second episode of the second season of the reimagined Battlestar Galactica television series. It aired originally on the Sci Fi Channel on July 22, 2005.

In the episode, Cylon Centurions board Galactica. The crew, led by Lee "Apollo" Adama, beat them back but suffer heavy casualties. On Kobol, Gaius Baltar's visions continue, and Chief Galen Tyrol euthanizes a dying comrade. On Caprica, Starbuck and Helo relax in Starbuck's apartment and then take her truck out of the city.

According to executive producer Ronald D. Moore, production and post-production for "Valley of Darkness" was contentious. Nonetheless, critics reviewed it favorably. The episode received a nomination at the 2005 VES awards for the (animated) Centurions.

== Plot ==
Having just jumped away from a battle with Cylons and rejoined the civilian fleet, a Cylon virus forces Galactica to switch to a limited emergency power as the crew fights off a boarding party of Cylon Centurions. Apollo releases President Roslin from the brig and she makes her way to sickbay just as the last of the Centurions are destroyed. With Galactica safe, Doctor Cottle makes his way to operate on a still-critical Commander Adama.

On Kobol, Tyrol and Cally return to the rest of the stranded survey team with the medical kit they had retrieved for a wounded Socinus only to learn that his death is inevitable. Tyrol reluctantly euthanizes him with lethal dosage of painkillers.

On Caprica, Starbuck and Helo stop at Starbuck's old apartment, where they listen to a recording of Starbuck's father playing the piano as Starbuck reflects on her life. They retrieve the keys to Starbuck's truck and escape the city in it.

== Symbolism ==
In his podcast commentary on "Valley of Darkness", Moore discusses his views of the symbolism appearing in the episode.

- He connects Baltar's dream about Adama killing the baby to episodes of infanticide in the Bible, such as the Massacre of the Innocents. The symbolism is intended to contextualize the magnitude of the threat to the baby Baltar is supposed to perceive.
- Baltar comments that Six's description of human sacrifice on Kobol differs greatly from the accounts of the in-universe Scriptures, which describe the planet as a paradise. Moore connects this with the Biblical story of the Garden of Eden. As in the case of Eden, he says, humanity was driven out of paradise as divine punishment for its sins, except Kobol was home to "a more brutal, ugly kind of sin than simply getting some fruit off of some old tree that you weren't supposed to be snacking on."

== Production ==
Much of the action in "Valley of Darkness" set on Kobol and Caprica was originally written as part of "Scattered". This produced a script that was too long for one episode but too short for two. The Cylon boarding party plot was conceived to fill enough time for a full second episode.

Chief Tyrol (Aaron Douglas) euthanizes Socinus (Alonso Oyarzun) as Seelix (Jennifer Halley) and Cally (Nicki Clyne) look on. This scene was controversial during production. Douglas described filming such scenes as "very draining" emotionally.

According to Moore, the production and post-production for "Valley of Darkness" was unusually contentious; it and "The Farm" were the most contentious episodes of the second season.

- After most of the shooting had concluded, the episode was viewed as too heavy. Moore and executive producer David Eick responded by adding scenes between Dee and Billy before and after the crisis. Moore felt that these "bookends" provide better context for their relationship at the expense of sense of urgency in the episode's first minutes. The scene between Tyrol and Cally and some extra time between Starbuck and Helo on Caprica were also added to lighten the mood.
- The scene where Baltar sees Adama drowning his and Six's baby was controversial because of its perceived brutality, but Moore and Eick fought to keep it in the episode. Ultimately the scene was shot and edited to minimize the screen presence of the drowning itself. Moore acknowledged that the scene would disturb some viewers but enjoyed the way it advanced the show's mythos.
- Socinus's death was controversial because of its emotional impact, but Moore considered it an important part of the episode. He had second thoughts about including it after learning that actor Aaron Douglas (Tyrol) had suffered a personal loss, but Douglas "really embraced it. He really wanted to do these scenes." Asked in a December 2005 interview what was the most difficult scene in the series to shoot, Douglas said, "The scenes where someone dies in the Chief's arms are difficult to do because they take a really long time to shoot and you are constantly in a state of loss and sadness. They are very draining."
- Moore filmed a number of scenes between Tigh and Apollo that were ultimately deleted after filming. In one, a flashback gives Tigh the idea that the Centurions plan on venting the airlocks. This was to be how Tigh recognized the strategy. Another deleted scene has an exchange between Apollo and CIC where Tigh tries to relieve Apollo of command. In a third deleted scene, Head Six tells Baltar that only he will live to see Earth. (Note: The connection, if one exists, between the Earth of the re-imagined Battlestar Galactica and the real-life Earth is unknown at this point in the series.)

The piano piece Starbuck and Helo listen to is "Metamorphosis One" by Philip Glass. The end of the piece is featured at the end of the episode. Glass's music was often used for temp tracks during production of the series. The microcassette format she uses is an homage to the film A Clockwork Orange.

When Tyrol and Cally rejoin the others, they use a countersign, a kind of challenge–response authentication, in which one party says "flash" and the other "thunder". These were the challenge and password, respectively, used by Allied soldiers on D-Day during World War II.

Actress Katee Sackhoff (Starbuck) played a large role in planning the look and feel of Starbuck's apartment. She and actor Tahmoh Penikett (Helo) did much of the painting on the walls and the canvases strewn about the room.

== Reception ==
"Valley of Darkness" received a nomination at the 2005 Visual Effects Society Awards for the Centurions, in the category "Outstanding Performance by an Animated Character in a Live Action Broadcast Program, Commercial, or Music Video". It lost to the following episode, "Fragged", which won for the Centurions in that episode.

"Valley of Darkness" received favorable critical review. Jen Segrest of AOL's TV Squad commended the scenes between Starbuck and Helo and said the final confrontation with the Centurions was "a [scene] you'll want to rewatch a few times in slow mo." Susan Tankersley of Television Without Pity gave "Valley of Darkness" a B+. Simon Brew of Den of Geek praised Tyrol's scene with Socinus, calling it "moving".

Eric Goldman of IGN ranked Tigh taking command at #11 on his list of the top 20 storylines and moments in the re-imagined Battlestar Galactica.

== Connection to other series elements ==
- The image painted on the wall of Starbuck's apartment, three concentric, colorful disks, reappears in the Temple of the Five in the third-season episode "The Eye of Jupiter".
- "Metamorphosis Five" is also featured in the fourth-season episode "Someone to Watch Over Me".
