= Jenifer (Masters of Horror) =

- Masters of Horror episode
- DVD cover for Jenifer
- Episode no.: Season 1 Episode 4
- Directed by: Dario Argento
- Written by: Steven Weber
- Story by: Berni Wrightson; Bruce Jones
- Production code: 104
- Original air date: November 18, 2005
- Running time: 58 minutes

Guest appearances
- Harris Allan; Jasmine Chan; Carrie Fleming; Brenda James; Steven Weber

Episode chronology
← Previous "Dance of the Dead"	Next → "Chocolate"

"Jenifer" is the fourth episode of the first season of Masters of Horror. It originally aired in North America on November 18, 2005. It was directed by Dario Argento and written by and starring Steven Weber. "Jenifer" is adapted from a 10-page black-and-white comic book story, written by Bruce Jones and illustrated by Bernie Wrightson, that originally appeared in issue #63 (July 1974) of the horror anthology title Creepy.

== Plot ==
Police officer Frank Spivey (Steven Weber) happens upon a man with a meat cleaver threatening a disfigured young woman (Carrie Fleming). Frank intervenes and the man warns Spivey that he "doesn't know what she is," forcing him to shoot the man before he kills her. Frank finds himself drawn to the girl.

Later that night at his home, Frank's wife Ruby (Brenda James) attempts to console him and as they begin to have sex, he loses himself in his fantasy of the woman and attempts to sexually assault his wife, who forces him off her.

The next day Frank learns the girl is named Jenifer and she is mute. He takes her to his home and Ruby and his son Pete (Harris Allen) react to meeting her with varying degrees of disgust and Jenifer attacks Ruby. Ruby issues an ultimatum that Frank must decide between Jenifer or her. Frank leaves with the young woman and Jenifer seduces him in his car. Frank returns home with Jenifer, who kills and eats his cat and his neighbor's daughter. Frank and Jenifer leave his home and he attempts to hide her. Frank gets a job at a market.

Jenifer follows the shop owner's son to a party and kidnaps him. Frank finds Jenifer in the cabin cellar devouring the boy's genitals and decides to kill her. Frank drags her through the woods to kill her and just as he's about to strike her down a hunter shoots Frank, who says "Jenifer" before dying. The hunter moves to comfort Jenifer.

== Cast ==
- Steven Weber as Frank Spivey, a police detective whose life is destroyed when he succumbs to Jenifer
- Carrie Anne Fleming as Jenifer, a siren-like woman who can entrance men despite her hideous appearance
- Brenda James as Ruby, Frank's wife, who is disgusted by Jenifer
- Harris Allan as Pete, Frank's son
- Beau Starr as Chief Charlie
- Laurie Brunetti as Spacey
- Cynthia Garris as Rose
- Jeffrey Ballard as the young Jack (credited as Jeff Ballard)

== Production ==
This episode was shot in and around Vancouver, British Columbia, Canada. The gore and make-up effects were done by KNB Effects and were received mostly positively by critics and fans. The DVD featurette "Howard Berger and the Make-Up of Jenifer" detailed the process Carrie-Anne Fleming went through to transform her into the beast.

This was the only episode of the first season to require cuts, though Takashi Miike's "Imprint" was entirely rejected for TV. Two shots were removed from the final film, both involving graphic depictions of oral sex: the first one occurred during the sex scene in the car between Frank and Jenifer; the second occurred at the end of the film and actually showed Jenifer castrating—and then eating—young Jack's penis. The deleted scenes are featured in the "So Hideous My Love'" documentary on the DVD.

== Reception ==
Jenifer was released to mixed reviews on its value as a film. Favorable reviews focused on Argento's ability to mix eroticism and repulsion with the sensuality of the film's sex scenes, often comparing it to his other films such as his version of the Phantom of the Opera and Sleepless.

== DVD information ==
Anchor Bay Entertainment released all the Masters of Horror DVDs with extra features for each episode. Their treatment of the DVDs were extremely well received, winning a Saturn Award for "Best Television Series Release on DVD" in 2006. The extra features for Jenifer's DVD release include:

- Commentary by writer/actor Steven Weber and DVD producer Perry Martin
- So Hideous My Love – An Interview with Dario Argento featurette
- Working With a Master: Dario Argento featurette
- Behind The Scenes: The Making of Jenifer featurette
- Howard Berger and The Make-Up of Jenifer featurette
- On Set: An Interview with Steven Weber
- On Set: An Interview with Carrie Anne Fleming
- Trailers
- Still gallery
- Dario Argento text bio
- Screenplay (DVD-ROM)
- Screen saver (DVD-ROM)
- Collectible trading card

As with most of the first season of Masters of Horror, Best Buy had an exclusive release which included a featurette called "Script to Screen".

It was originally packaged separately, but later releases packaged it with "Haeckel's Tale" and then the entire first season. Each DVD release has contained all the features the initial release did.

== See also ==
- Eel Girl
- Harpya
- Shambleau
- Tomie
