= Soldier (The Outer Limits) =

- The Outer Limits episode
- Episode no.: Season 2 Episode 1
- Directed by: Gerd Oswald
- Written by: Harlan Ellison
- Based on: "Soldier from Tomorrow" by Harlan Ellison (source material uncredited)
- Cinematography by: Kenneth Peach
- Production code: 34
- Original air date: September 19, 1964

Guest appearances
- Lloyd Nolan; Michael Ansara; Tim O'Connor

Episode chronology
← Previous "The Forms of Things Unknown"	Next → "Cold Hands, Warm Heart"

"Soldier" is the first of two episodes of The Outer Limits television series written by Harlan Ellison and is loosely adapted from his 1957 short story "Soldier from Tomorrow". It first aired on September 19, 1964, during the second season.

== Plot ==
Eighteen hundred years in the future, two infantrymen clash on a battlefield. A random energy weapon strikes both and they are hurled into a time vortex. While one soldier is temporarily trapped in the time limbo, the other, Qarlo Clobregnny, materializes in an alley off a city street in the United States in the year 1964.

The feral Qarlo is soon captured and later interrogated by Tom Kagan, a philologist. Qarlo’s origin is eventually discovered after Kagan translates his seemingly unintelligible language – "Nims qarlo clobregnny prite arem aean teaan deao" – into colloquial English..."(My) name is Qarlo Clobregnny, private, RM EN TN DO"; his name, rank and serial letters, which is what any soldier would reveal if captured by the enemy. Qarlo has been bred and trained for one purpose: to kill the enemy. Kagan makes progress in "taming" Qarlo, however, and despite the reservations of his government associates, Kagan takes Qarlo to his home and family. Although he seemingly begins to trust Kagan, Qarlo breaks into a gun shop and brings home a rifle.

Meanwhile, the time eddy holding the enemy soldier eventually weakens and he materializes in 1964 and tracks Qarlo to Kagan's home. In a final hand-to-hand battle, the soldiers kill each other, but the question is posed whether Qarlo sacrificed his life because he was trained to kill, or because he wanted to save the Kagan family.

== Production ==
Interiors were shot at Paramount Studios. Qarlo’s “War Zone" was shot on the Paramount Sunset stage, a gigantic stage the size of three stages put together. A sky cyclorama ran all the way round it and a horizon line of mountains was placed in front of that in diminished perspective. A fog machine provided the landscape with a smokey haziness. The gun shop scene was filmed on the Paramount Backlot, on New York Street.

== The Terminator and allegations of plagiarism ==
Ellison brought suit against The Terminator production company Hemdale and distributor Orion Pictures for plagiarism of this episode, since both works involve a soldier from the future who goes back in time and saves the life of a present-day woman from an enemy soldier from the future. According to the Los Angeles Times, the parties settled the lawsuit for an undisclosed amount, and an acknowledgement of Ellison's works in the credits of Terminator. The credits were added only to the home video releases of Terminator and read simply, "Acknowledgment to the Works of Harlan Ellison". The credit was also present on the 4k restoration that received a cinematic release and was released on Blu-ray in 2024 for the film's 40th anniversary.

James Cameron denied Ellison's allegations and was opposed to the settlement. He has rarely spoken about the issue, but commented on the addition of acknowledgement credits at the 1991 T2 Convention saying, "For legal reasons, I'm not supposed to comment on that, but it was a real bum deal, I had nothing to do with it and I disagree with it."

== Cast ==
- Lloyd Nolan – as Tom Kagan
- Michael Ansara – as Qarlo Clobregnny
- Tim O'Connor – as Paul Tanner
- Catherine McLeod – as Abby Kagan
- Jill Hill – as Toni Kagan
- Allen Jaffe – as The Enemy
- Ralph Hart – as Loren Kagan
- Marlowe Jensen – as Sgt. Berry
- Ted Stanhope – as Doctor
- Jamie Forster – as News Vendor
- Mavis Neal Palmer – as Woman
- Vic Perrin and Tim O'Connor – as the Voices in Qarlo and The Enemy's War Helmets (uncredited)

== Sequel ==
Author Kevin J. Anderson later wrote a prose sequel for the episode entitled Prisoner of War which was published in the anthology The Outer Limits: Armageddon Dreams.

== See Also ==
- Soldier (1998 American film)
