= Homecoming (Masters of Horror) =

- Masters of Horror episode
- DVD cover
- Episode no.: Season 1 Episode 6
- Directed by: Joe Dante
- Teleplay by: Sam Hamm
- Based on: "Death & Suffrage" by Dale Bailey
- Production code: 106
- Original air date: December 2, 2005

Guest appearances
- Beverly Breuer; Jason Emanuel; Thea Gill; Ryan McDonnell; Terry David Mulligan; Robert Picardo; Jon Tenney

Episode chronology
← Previous "Chocolate"	Next → "Deer Woman"

"Homecoming" is the sixth episode of the first season of Masters of Horror. It originally aired in North America on December 2, 2005. It is loosely based on the 2002 short story "Death & Suffrage" by Dale Bailey.

== Plot ==
President George W. Bush is running for reelection during a divisive war, and one of his speechwriters, David Murch (Jon Tenney), goes on TV to speak with talk show hosts Marty Clark (Terry David Mulligan) and Jane Cleaver. Another guest, the Cindy Sheehan-like mother of a dead soldier Janet Hofstader (Beverly Breuer), demands to know what her son died for. Murch gets a bit teary-eyed as he explains that he lost his older brother Philip (Ryan McDonnell) in Vietnam.

"Believe me," he tells the grieving mom, "if I had one wish, I would wish for your son to come back, because I know he would tell us how important this struggle is."

Cleaver is so impressed with Murch's handling of the situation that she takes him out for a drink later, picks his brain, and eventually seduces him. The Karl Rove-like Kurt Rand (Dante regular Robert Picardo) interrupts their tryst, calling to let Murch know that the president plans to make his line part of his stump speech.

Soon, the soldiers killed in Iraq actually do start returning from the dead. However, they are not back to feast on the living, or even to get revenge on the president and his supporters. They just want a chance to vote in the upcoming election. "We'll vote for anyone who ends this war," one explains.

The spin machine goes into overdrive, but the dead are determined to make their voice heard, even going as far as one soldier killing Kurt Rand by acting out the Lucio Fulci zombie stereotype (gouging his eye and slamming his head into the table) when Rand tried to force him to sign an unwanted document by threatening the soldier's mother.

While voting results are being counted during the election, people within the current administration decide to skew the results so the current administration remains in power. After the election results are broadcast, more soldiers begin to return from the dead... but not just ones from Iraq. Soldiers begin to return from previous wars including World War I and II, the Vietnam War, and the Civil War. Eventually all of the people who died during wartime to protect the United States of America have returned from the dead.

The progress of the episode also reveals a shadowy mistake from Murch's past. He believed that his brother Philip was murdered in the Vietnam War, only to discover that it was he who unintentionally killed him long ago with a gun in a game of "friend or foe".

After Cleaver attacks the soldiers with her shotgun, Murch kills her, but fails to kill himself. Murch is countered by a soldier that asks him to join them, saying, "We're looking for a few good men." Philip is among those returning from the grave, saying he forgives Murch for killing him—and then snaps Murch's neck.

Now one of the zombies, Murch announces that he will show anyone who sends their brothers and sisters to die for a lie the true face of hell.

== Cast ==
- Jon Tenney as David Murch
- Thea Gill as Jane Cleaver
- Wanda Cannon as Kathy Hobart
- Terry David Mulligan as Marty Clark
- Robert Picardo as Kurt Rand

== DVD and Blu-ray ==
The DVD was released by Anchor Bay Entertainment on July 18, 2006. The episode was the sixth episode and the seventh to be released on DVD. The episode appears on the fourth volume of the Blu-ray compilation of the series.

== References to popular culture ==
During the scene where the dead rise from their graves, the gravestones are marked with the names of Jacques Tourneur, George A. Romero, Jean Yarbrough, Lucio Fulci, Del Tenney, Gordon Douglas, John Gilling, Victor Halperin and Steve Sekely, who are other zombie film directors.

== Reception ==
The episode received generally favorable reviews. Village Voice described the film as "easily one of the most important political films of the Bush II era", a sentiment echoed by The New Yorker, who said that it was "[t]he best political film of 2005."

== See also ==
- List of sources for anthology series
