= Scattered (Battlestar Galactica) =

- Battlestar Galactica episode
- Episode no.: Season 2 Episode 1
- Directed by: Michael Rymer
- Written by: David Weddle; Bradley Thompson
- Original air date: July 15, 2005

Guest appearances
- Sam Witwer as Crashdown; Kate Vernon as Ellen Tigh

Episode chronology
← Previous "Kobol's Last Gleaming"	Next → "Valley of Darkness"
- Battlestar Galactica season 2

"Scattered" is the first episode of the second season of the reimagined Battlestar Galactica television series. It aired originally on the Sci Fi Channel on July 15, 2005.

In the episode, Commander William Adama is in critical condition following his shooting in the cliffhanger ending of the first season. Galactica is separated from the fleet during a Cylon attack, and Colonel Saul Tigh, now in command, must reunite them. He does this by ordering the ship's computers networked in defiance of Adama's standing orders. Cylon Centurions board Galactica. On Kobol, Cylons kill one of the survivors of the Raptor crash.

The episode received favorable critical reception.

== Plot ==
With Commander Adama shot in the chest by Boomer, Col. Tigh is forced to take command as a Cylon Basestar arrives. Tigh has the fleet take an emergency faster-than-light jump to escape, despite the stranded survey team on the planet Kobol. When Galactica jumps, however, the rest of the fleet is not there.

Tigh interrogates Boomer in the brig. Boomer, horrified at her own betrayal, urges him to kill her, but he refuses. A medic is forced to operate on Adama in Dr. Cottle's absence. In a sequence of flashbacks, Tigh recalls how Adama got Tigh back into the Colonial Fleet following the First Cylon War.

In order to find the fleet, Tigh has Galactica jump back to orbit around Kobol with the ship's computers networked together (something Adama would have vehemently opposed because of the dangers of Cylon hacking) to calculate the jump coordinates before the Cylons can destroy Galactica. He also paroles Apollo, still in the brig for his attempted mutiny, so that he can command the Vipers in the coming battle. As the battle rages, the Cylons attempt to hack Galactica's network, but Lieutenant Gaeta's five stage software firewall appears to hold, with the fifth stage not breaching until the same moment he disengages the network. A Cylon Heavy Raider crashes into Galactica shortly before Galactica jumps and meets the fleet. A group of Cylon Centurions emerges from the Heavy Raider.

On Kobol, Crashdown orders the survivors to take cover in a nearby forest. In an attempt to recover medical supplies that they left behind, he has Tarn, Chief Tyrol and Cally retrieve them, but Cylons kill Tarn before they get back.

On Caprica, Helo stops Starbuck from shooting Caprica-Boomer. As they argue, Boomer steals Starbuck's Cylon Raider, stranding them.

== Characterization ==
In his podcast commentary on "Scattered", executive producer Ronald D. Moore discussed his views of what the episode's events reveal about several of the characters.

- Tigh's success leading Galactica back to the fleet in "Scattered" and dealing with the Centurion threat in the following episode, "Valley of Darkness", validates Adama's faith in him. After the military crises passes, Tigh's leadership is hampered by his lack of political skill, his alcoholism and Ellen Tigh's manipulation.
- The writers created Crashdown in the first season to replace Helo as Galactica-Boomer's electronic countermeasures officer. He was conceived as a jokester and he demonstrates in this episode that he may not have the skills necessary to lead an infantry unit.
- During the space battle, the Marine guarding Laura Roslin's cell asks to pray with her and calls her a prophet of the gods. According to Moore, this marks the beginning of some people in the fleet viewing Roslin as a religious figure and Roslin's reluctant embrace of that role.
- The scenes between Roslin and Apollo in the brig are tense because of Apollo's disappointment that Roslin failed to back him up when he defied the coup in "Kobol's Last Gleaming". Apollo expresses this disappointment in a scene deleted from "The Farm".

== Production ==
Saul Tigh (Michael Hogan) and William Adama (Edward James Olmos) in a flashback. Efforts to make the actors appear decades younger were met with dissatisfaction.

The second-season premiere was initially going to be set in the distant past, leaving unaddressed the cliffhanger that ended the previous season. "Scattered" would have been the second season's second episode and would have included the action on Kobol and Caprica shown in "Valley of Darkness". After this idea was abandoned, the writers considered opening the episode with the deleted flashback in which Adama and Tigh first met. Several flashbacks providing background on Adama and Tigh's relationship were filmed, but the production team felt that the flashbacks fit poorly into the series's tone. Also, they did not want to recast younger actors to play Adama and Tigh but were unsatisfied by the efforts to make actors Edward James Olmos and Michael Hogan appear decades younger. The final version has fewer, shorter flashbacks intended to focus mostly on Tigh's character. Several of the abandoned flashbacks are included as deleted scenes on the DVD. The flashback in which military police find a drunken Tigh in his hotel room and tell him Adama has gotten him reinstated is an homage to the film Apocalypse Now.

"Scattered" was the first episode of Battlestar Galactica broadcast in North America that used music over the main credits that had previously been used only in the UK broadcasts. According to Moore, everyone involved in the show preferred the UK version. "Scattered" omits the montage of upcoming scenes that followed the credits in first-season episodes, both because of time considerations and in response to criticism of the montages.

The idea of Galactica and the fleet being separated after a jump was one of the original log lines Moore submitted to the Sci Fi network before the networked picked up Battlestar Galactica.

Several shots of Tigh walking the corridors of Galactica appearing in "Scattered" were actually filmed for the second season's fourth episode, "Resistance". The production team needed the shots in "Scattered" to intercut with one of Tigh's flashbacks. Several shots in the space battle scene appeared first in the miniseries.

The dialogue among Tyrol, Cally, and Tarn before they are ambushed by Cylons was improvised by the actors. Moore saw Tarn's death as commentary of the ugliness of war. Asked in a December 2005 interview what was the most difficult scene in the series to shoot, actor Aaron Douglas (Tyrol) said, "The scenes where someone dies in the Chief's arms are difficult to do because they take a really long time to shoot and you are constantly in a state of loss and sadness. They are very draining."

== Reception ==
"Scattered" was reviewed favorably by critics. Robert Bianco of USA Today gave "Scattered" three and a half stars out of four. Susan Tankersley of Television Without Pity gave the episode an A, finding the jumping dilemma contrived but saying the space battle "look[ed] fantastic." Kevin McDonough of the Intelligencer Journal praised the episode's incorporation of scenes from multiple genres, including "a hospital operating-room drama, terrestrial combat action, political intrigue and your standard space dogfight conducted at warp speed." Jason Davis of Mania gave it a B+, praising Hogan's acting and the flashbacks. Simon Brew of Den of Geek appreciated the visual device used to show the Cylons trying to penetrate Gaeta's firewall.

Eric Goldman of IGN ranked Tigh taking command in "Scattered" and the following three episodes at #11 on his list of the top 20 storylines and moments in the re-imagined Battlestar Galactica.

== Connections to other series elements ==
- The crew of Galactica discover and battle the intruding Cylon Centurions in the following episode, "Valley of Darkness".
- Also in "Valley of Darkness", the medical supplies arrive too late, and Socinus dies.
- In the episode "Flight of the Phoenix", it is revealed that a Cylon virus penetrated Galactica's computers despite Gaeta's firewall.
