= Zacarías M. de la Riva =

Spanish film composer (born 1972)

- Born: Zacarías Martínez de la Riva Antigas; 12 August 1972 (age 54); Barcelona, Spain
- Genre: Soundtrack (Film score)
- Occupations: Composer, Orchestrator
- Website: zacarias.com.es

Zacarías Martínez de la Riva (born August 12, 1972) is a Spanish film composer. Notable for his work in Tad, The Lost Explorer, Riva has worked on psychological thrillers, romantic comedies, dramas, documentaries, and animated films, as well as short films and television programs.

== Biography ==
Riva began a career as a telecommunications engineer. In 1992, he attended to attend the Berklee College of Music in Boston, where he received a dual degree in composition and film scoring.

After graduating, Riva returned to Spain and began working with young directors. He spent his first years as a composer, providing music for short films.

Since 2000, he began collaborating with well-known artists such as Juan Bardem, Lucio Godoy and Roque Baños as an orchestrator. He later made his debut music work in a feature film for the film titled 2001's Jaizkibel. In 2004, he composed the music for the first Tadeo Jones animated short, which won a Goya Award for Best Animated Short. In the same year he composed music for several films, including The Nun, Beneath Still Waters, and Specter.

In 2006, he met film producer Elías Querejeta and worked on a number of documentaries: Noticias de una Guerra (2006), Cerca de Tus Ojos (2008), and Las Catedrales de Vino (2009). In 2007, he met Manuel Carballo and composed the music for his opera, The Last of the Just. He also composed the soundtrack for another feature film, Exorcismus: The Possession of Emma Evans. In 2008, he began to work on international films, including The Anarchist's Wife, Carmo, and Imago Mortis.

In 2014, he wrote the music for science fiction movie Autómata. The score was well received by film music critics, and was nominated for best science fiction soundtrack in a number of festivals. It won 2014 best Spanish soundtrack and 2014 best Spanish composer.

In 2015, he composed music for three feature films. One was the Mexican animated film Un Gallo con Muchos Huevos, which was the first Mexican animated movie to receive a wide release in United States. Another was a French experimental film entitled Evolution, directed by Lucile Hadzihalilovic, which won the Special Jury Prize at San Sebastian’s film festival. The third was an English horror movie, The Rezort, directed by Steve Barker.

In 2016, he composed for the American indie-thriller PET, directed by Carles Torrens. His music has been played by several well-known Spanish orchestras, such as the RTVE orchestra, the Euskadiko Orkester, the Ciudad de Granada Orchestra and the Tenerife Symphony Orchestra. His piece Apology was used by the 2018 Drum Corps International champions Santa Clara Vanguard as part of their production entitled Babylon.

== Filmography ==
=== 1990s ===
Year	Film	Director(s)	Note(s)
1998	Negra Rosa	Ibon Cormenzana	Short film
1999	Silencios	Ibon Cormenzana	Short film
1999	8, 9 y 10	Ibon Cormenzana	Short film

=== 2000s ===
Year	Film	Director(s)	Note(s)
2001	Jaizkibel	Ibon Cormenzana	Feature film debut; final collaboration with Ibon Cormenzana
2003	Niebla	Mónica Alonso	Short film
2003	El Cid: The Legend	Jose Pozo	Animated film; with Óscar Araujo
2004	Tadeo Jones	Enrique Gato	Animated short film; first collaboration with Enrique Gato
2005	Beneath Still Waters	Brian Yuzna	
2005	Erik	Ángel Blasco	
2005	The Nun		Additional music
2006	Spectre	Mateo Gil	Television film
2006	Noticias de una guerra	Eterio Ortega	Documentary; first collaboration with Eterio Ortega
2006	Coming to Town	Carles Torrens	Short film; first collaboration with Carles Torrens
2007	Tadeo Jones y el sótano maldito	Enrique Gato	Animated short film
2007	El último justo	Manuel Carballo	
2008	The Anarchist's Wife	Marie Noëlle; Peter Sehr	
2008	Delaney	Carles Torrens	Short film
2008	Carmo, Hit the Road	Murilo Pasta	
2009	Imago Mortis	Stefano Bessoni	
2009	Chuckle Boy	Daniel Aranyó	American short film
2009	Hierro	Gabe Ibáñez	
2009	Cerca de tus ojos	Elías Querejeta	Documentary

=== 2010s ===
Year	Film	Director(s)	Note(s)
2010	Mi amigo invisible	Pablo Larcuen	Short film
2010	Exorcismus	Manuel Carballo	
2011	Las catedrales del vino	Eterio Ortega	Documentary
2011	¿Estás ahí?	Roberto Santiago	
2011	Voces desde Mozambique	Susana Guardiola; Françoise Polo	Documentary
2011	Luz de mar	Raúl Serrano; Luis Vázquez	Documentary
2011	Snowflake, the White Gorilla	Andrés G. Schaer	
2012	Childish Games	Antonio Chavarrías	With Joan Valent
2012	Tad, The Lost Explorer	Enrique Gato	Animated film
2012	La mano de Nefertiti	Guillermo García Carsí	Animated short film
2013	La estrella	Alberto Aranda	
2013	Sequence	Carles Torrens	Short film
2014	Autómata	Gabe Ibáñez	
2014	No digas nada	Silvia Abascal	Short film
2014	Récord	Joaquín Sánchez Baillo	Short film
2014	Through the Breaking Glass	Ivan Mena	Short film
2015	The Rezort	Steve Barker	
2015	Un gallo con muchos huevos	Gabriel Riva Palacio Alatriste; Rodolfo Riva Palacio Alatriste	Mexican animated film; first collaboration with the Riva brothers
2015	Evolution	Lucile Hadžihalilović	
2016	PET	Carles Torrens	First feature film with Carles Torrens
2016	ABCs of Death 2.5	Carles Torrens; Various other directors	Segment: "M is for Mom" by Carles Torrens
2017	Black Snow	Martin Hodara	
2017	Pequeños Héroes	Juan Pablo Buscarini	Animated film
2017	Tad the Lost Explorer and the Secret of King Midas	David Alonso; Enrique Gato	Animated film
2017	Hombre de fe	Dinga Haines	Costa Rican film
2018	Bent	Bobby Moresco	
2018	El mejor verano de mi vida	Dani de la Orden	First collaboration with Dani de la Orden
2019	The Kill Team	Dan Krauss	

=== 2020s ===
Year	Film	Director(s)	Note(s)
2020	Hasta que la boda nos separe	Dani de la Orden	
2020	Superagente Makey	Alfonso Sánchez	
2021	Un rescate de huevitos	Gabriel Riva Palacio Alatriste; Rodolfo Riva Palacio Alatriste	Mexican animated film
2022	Tad, the Lost Explorer and the Emerald Tablet	Enrique Gato	Animated film
2022	Huevitos congelados	Gabriel Riva Palacio Alatriste; Rodolfo Riva Palacio Alatriste	Mexican animated film
TBA	Edict of Expulsion 1492	Omer Sarikaya	

== Awards ==
- 2014 : Premios Goldspirit a mejor compositor español del año y a mejor banda sonora española del año - Autómata
- 2014 : Premio de la Crítica Cinematográfica Española a mejor banda sonora del año - Autómata
- 2013 : Premio en el Festival de Medina del Campoo a mejor música original - Sequence
- 2007 : Premio en el Festival Internacional de Cine de Alcalá de Henares a mejor música - Tadeo Jones y el sótano maldito
- 2006 : Premio en el Festival de CineMálaga a mejor música - Tadeo Jones
- 2005 : Premio en el Festival de Cine Dos Hermanas a mejor música - Tadeo Jones
- 2004 : Premio en el Festival de Cine de Elche a mejor música - Niebla

== Nominations ==
- 2014 : Premios Film Music Magazine por mejor banda sonora del año - Autómata
- 2014 : Premios Film and Video Game Soundtrack por mejor banda sonora del año - Autómata
- 2014 : Premios Reel Music por mejor banda sonora del año y mejor banda sonora de ciencia ficción - Autómata
- 2014 : Premios Synchrotones por mejor banda sonora del año y mejor banda sonora de ciencia ficción - Autómata
- 2014 : Premios Soundtrack Geek por mejor sorpresa del año y mejor banda sonora de ciencia ficción - Autómata
- 2014 : Premios IFMCA (International film music critics association) por mejor banda sonora de ciencia ficción - Autómata
- 2013 : Premios CEC por mejor banda sonora - Tad, The Lost Explorer
- 2013 : Premios Gaudí por mejor banda sonora - Tad, The Lost Explorer
- 2013 : Goya a la mejor banda sonora - Tad, The Lost Explorer
- 2012 : Premios Goldspirit por mejor compositor español, mejor banda sonora española y mejor banda sonora de animación - Tad, The Lost Explorer
- 2011 : Premios Movie Music UK por mejor banda sonora de animación - Copito de Nieve
- 2009 : Premios Movie Music UK por compositor revelación
- 2009 : Premios Goldspirit por mejor compositor revelación, compositor español y mejor banda sonora española - Hierro
- 2009 : Premios IFMCA (International film music critics association) a mejor banda sonora de película de terror - Imago Mortis
- 2008 : Premios Jerry Goldsmith por mejor música en largometraje y cortometraje de animación - La mujer del anarquista & Tadeo Jones y el sótano maldito
