= Progeny (film) =

1998 American science fiction film

- Directed by: Brian Yuzna
- Written by: Aubrey Solomon; Stuart Gordon
- Produced by: Jack F. Murphy; Henry Seggerman
- Starring: Arnold Vosloo; Jillian McWhirter; Brad Dourif; Susanne Wright
- Distributed by: Progeny Films Inc.
- Release date: March 30, 1999
- Running time: 98 minutes
- Country: United States
- Language: English
- Budget: $6 million

Progeny is a 1998 American science fiction film. It was directed by Brian Yuzna and written by Aubrey Solomon and Stuart Gordon. The film stars Arnold Vosloo as Dr. Craig Burton, Jillian McWhirter as Sherry Burton, Brad Dourif as Dr. Bert Clavell and Lindsay Crouse as Dr. Susan Lamarche.

== Plot ==
Sherry Burton, a professional woman, discovers she is pregnant. While this is happy news for her and her husband Craig - an emergency room surgeon - both begin having strange memories from the night of conception, where Sherry is abducted by strange, grey extraterrestrials. In addition, Craig begins experiencing incidents of missing time and Sherry suffers chronic pain and unusual side effects from her pregnancy. Uneasiness then becomes terror when both are convinced that she is carrying something alien inside her body.

Craig and Sherry both consult their therapist, Dr. Susan Lamarche, for advice, but Lamarche is unable to give them a satisfactory explanation. Craig asks his colleague, gynecologist Dr. David Wetherly, to examine Sherry and perform an ultrasound. Though Wetherly's ultrasound proves the baby has an abnormal and inhuman appearance, he suffers a massive heart attack that leaves him hospitalized. Wetherly later dies of cardiac arrest before he can corroborate this. Craig becomes convinced it is the work of aliens.

Sherry's behavior becomes more erratic as she falls under the influence of the aliens, and she is hospitalized for pneumonia after submerging herself in an ice bath for hours. Craig consults UFOlogist Dr. Bert Clavell. Clavell explains that for centuries, aliens have been abducting humans to experiment on them, and their artificial insemination of Sherry is one of their most recurring tactics. Clavell likens this to what animal testing is from the perspective of the animals.

Craig and Clavell enter Sherry's hospital room, and Craig injects her with sodium pentathol to help hypnotize her to recall her abduction. They succeed - but Lamarche interrupts and has them both removed. Still determined, Craig breaks back into the hospital to surgically remove the alien fetus. He and Clavell discretely take Sherry to the operating room, where Craig reveals he plans to temporarily flatline her so the aliens will believe she is dead and remove the fetus, giving himself a four-minute window to revive her. A horrified Clavell declines to help and leaves.

Craig performs the surgery. However, when he attempts to revive her, he realizes he's thirty minutes too late. The aliens used their ability to induce missing time to stop him from successfully resuscitating her. Craig is arrested for her murder.

An unspecified period of time later, Craig has been imprisoned for Sherry's murder. The aliens once again return, and abduct Craig from his prison cell to parts unknown.

== Cast ==
- Arnold Vosloo as Dr. Craig Burton
- Jillian McWhirter as Sherry Burton
- Brad Dourif as Dr. Bert Clavell
- Lindsay Crouse as Dr. Susan Lamarche
- Wilford Brimley as Dr. David Wetherly
- Willard E. Pugh as Eric Davidson
- David Wells as Dr. Duke Kelly
- Jan Hoag as Nurse Ida
- Don Calfa as Jimmy Stevens
- Timilee Romolini as Devon Thompson
- Nora Paradiso as Karen Boglia
- Patty Toy as Nurse Jane
- Susan Ripaldi as Nurse Della
- Barry Morris as Immigration Officer
- Logan Yuzna as Boy Patient
- Pancho Demmings as Officer McGuire
- Lisa Crosato as Bev

== Production ==
According to screenwriter Aubrey Solomon, she noted her inspiration for the film's underling concept:

I was fascinated with the idea of a foreign body growing inside of a woman during pregnancy, I’ve always been interested in racial movies and how that affects people, because I’m interested in racism and xenophobia [fear of foreigners] and the fact that immigrants come into this country and people start to feel the pressure. You don’t think about it too much, but it really bothers some people. Other cultures come into America and impose themselves upon you. This alien is imposing itself on this couple.

Solomon further stated that difficulties he and his wife had conceiving their second child played a large part in dictating the story. Stuart Gordon would co-write the screenplay with Solomon and serve as an executive producer on the film and provided significant input into the production.

Progeny was officially announced in June 1997 at Fantafestival in Rome, Italy with director-producer Brian Yuzna describing the film as "an alien version of Rosemary's Baby" with the story instead told from the husband's perspective. Producer Jack Murphy had brought the project to Jillian McWhirter during one of her stage performances with McWhirter eager to take on the part as she liked the range of emotions her character would go through in contrast to all the banal "pretty girl" parts other producers had offered her. According to Yuzna, several other women were considered fro the role prior to McWhirter's casting but balked at both nudity required as well as the traumatic events that are inflicted on the character. Producers Jack Murphy and Henry Seggerman stated the script incorporated elements from the experiences of alleged alien abductees with both Murphy and Seggerman intrigued by the projects unnerving underlying themes of bodily violation by unknowable forces that made the film a unique mixture of science fiction, horror and psychological drama.

The scene in which Sherry is probed by a little tube coming out of the wall and penetrating her vagina was Jillian McWhirter's idea. Production on the film took place in Los Angeles, California throughout October 1997 and completed at the end of the month.

The effects for the film were created by Anthony C. Ferrante and Screaming Mad George.

== Release ==
Progeny was shown at the Cannes Film Festival in May 1998 before it was given a straight-to-video release on March 30, 1999.

== Reception ==
In her review for Variety, Deborah Young wrote "unfolds as predictably as a TV movie with a giant f/x budget. At the same time, Yuzna's taste for disturbing psychological implications gives pic an intriguing edge. "

== Nominations ==
Brian Yuzna nominated at the 1998 International Fantasy Film Award, Porto, Portugal.
