= Pedro Cunha =

Pedro Cunha may refer to:

- Pedro Cunha (actor) (1980–2014), Portuguese actor
- Pedro Cunha (volleyball) (born 1983), Brazilian volleyball player
