= Arrayán (TV series) =

- Genre: Soap opera
- Developed by: Linze TV
- Directed by: Eduardo Galdo
- Starring: Sauce Ena; Carlos Castel; Fabiola Toledo; Eva Pedraza; Silvia Medina
- Opening theme: «Quiero que estés aquí» by Maria Villalón
- Country of origin: Spain
- Original language: Spanish
- No. of seasons: 13
- No. of episodes: 2.400

Production
- Camera setup: Multi-camera
- Running time: 25–30 minutes

Original release
- Network: Canal Sur
- Release: February 3, 2001 – January 9, 2013

Arrayán was a Spanish TV soap opera which was aired on Canal Sur. It became the longest running soap opera in Spanish television history, more than 2.400 episodes were aired between 2001 and 2013. The duration of each episode was about 25 to 30 minutes and was aired from Monday to Thursday at 21.45 h.

== Plot ==
The story takes place in an existing luxury hotel in a fictional town but is filmed in Coin (Malaga) on the Andalusian coast, called "Hotel Arrayan". Germán Santisteban, its creator and director for decades, will retire; however, he is assassinated. This starts a chain of events. Although the plot of the series changed a lot, the series continues to show everyday life in the hotel, the lives of their workers and the relationship with other employees and with customers.

Every season shows new characters and situations, serving as a springboard for many Andalusian actors, as well as enjoying the participation of renowned actors of Spanish national scene, hailing both from Andalusia and elsewhere.

On January 9, 2013 the last 5 episodes of the series were aired, putting an end to the second long-running series of television in Spain to date, after the Basque Goenkale.

== Cast ==
=== Main cast ===
- Sauce Ena: Lucía Reyes
- Carlos Castel: Daniel Santisteban
- Fabiola Toledo: Rosa Villalobos
- Eva Pedraza: Charo y Rocío Valverde
- Silvia Medina Raquel
- Salvador Guerrero: Mario
- Antonio Salazar Luque: Cati
- Jaime Puerta: Iván García Palacios
- Alejandro Navamuel: Antonio
- Nuhr Jojo: Menchu
- Antonio Zafra: Pepe
- Lola Manzanares: Montse
- Àlex Casademunt: Pablo Gálvez
- Rocío Rubio: Elena Duarte
- Álvaro Morte: Tomás Méndez Prados
- Inma Pérez-Quirós: Ana Prados)
- Eloi Yebra: Quique Montes
- Concha Galán: Otilia Andrade
- Andrea Dueso: Dolores Romero Andrade
- Aurelio Trillo: Pedro Méndez Prados
- Roberto Correcher: Lázaro
- Eduardo Velasco: Ernesto Mendoza
- Pedro Cunha: Benja
- David de Gea Asier

=== Recurrent cast ===
- Remedios Cervantes: Pilar
- Jose Manuel Seda Pablo
- Cuca Escribano Teresa
- Susana Córdoba Sofía
- Mariano Peña Lorenzo
- Agustín González Germán
- Ricardo Arroyo Mateo
- Santiago Meléndez Jose Luis
- Micaela Quesada Bárbara
- Gracia Carvajal Emilia
- Alberto Amarilla Jorge
- Inma Molina Silvia
- Beatriz Catalán Irene
- Alfonsa Rosso Paqui
- Mónica Cruz Mónica
- Joaquín Luna Andrés
- Pedro Segura Juanje
- Pepe Salas Florentino
- Emilio Buale René
- Moncho S.-Diezma Lucena
- Marcos Marcel David
- Candela Fernández Laura
- Germán Cobos Arturo
- Raquel Infante: Sole
- Miguel Hermoso: Oscar Román
- Jesús Cabrero: Carlos
- María Delgado: Isabel
- Roberto San Martín: Alberto
- Celine Fabra: Marta
- Juan Jesús Valverde:
- Estefanía Sandoval: Marina
- Juanma Lara: Matute
- Alberto Ferreriro: Lolo
- Ana Rujas: Esther
- Jesús Carrillo: Gustavo
- Paula Meliveo: Susana
- Rebeca Tebar: Manoli
- Pablo Puyol: Hugo
- Raquel Meroño: Begoña
- Concha Goyanes: Leonor

== Success ==
The series became a success since its early chapters. And it retained high ratings throughout its path. According to its creators, the key was to have frames where a contemporary and urban Andalusia was drawn. These frames run through topics such as drugs, crime, immigration, human and romantic relationships, etc. Test of its success is receiving several awards, the most prominent being the Ondas Award for Best Spanish 2005 series "for being a pioneer in the genre of daily television drama in prime time with an outstanding success".

== Cancellation ==
In July 2012 Radio y Televisión de Andalucía announced that due to budget cuts in the entity Arrayán will be canceled. On January 9, 2013 the last 5 episodes were aired.
