= Sequence (2013 film) =

- 'Film poster
- Directed by: Carles Torrens
- Written by: Carles Torens
- Produced by: Brett Forbes; James Graves; Mitchell Grobman; Patrick Rizzotti
- Starring: Joe Hursley; Ronnie Gene Blevins; Marcus Dunstan; Diana Lado
- Cinematography: Kyle Klutz
- Edited by: Andrew Coutts
- Music by: Zacarías M. de la Riva
- Production company: Fortress Features
- Release date: September 6, 2013 (LA Shorts Fest)
- Running time: 20 minutes
- Country: United States
- Language: English

Sequence is a 2013 short fantasy horror film written and directed by Carles Torrens and starring Joe Hursley, Emma Fitzpatrick, and Ronnie Gene Blevins. The film premiered September 6, 2013, at the Los Angeles International Short Film Festival.

== Plot ==
Billy (Joe Hursley) wakes up one morning only to discover that everyone else in the world had a disturbing nightmare about him the night before. He finds a suspicious note on his car simply saying "You're it" and each person he meets has fearful, strange, or hostile reactions to seeing him in person after their dreams. Billy is unable to find anyone willing to tell him the contents of their dream. After a bitter attack by another, Billy wakes with a start in his own bed and realizes that the day's events were themselves a nightmare of his own, itself shared by everyone else in the world. But the sequence continues.

== Main cast ==
- Joe Hursley as Billy
- Emma Fitzpatrick as Amy
- Ronnie Gene Blevins as Robber
- Ruben Garfias as Hector
- Jayne Taini as Mrs. Dunbrow
- Meng as Kang
- Frank Alvarez as Jorge
- Richard Chagoury as Denish
- Mel Fair as Anchorman
- Marcus Dunstan as Angry Man
- Ryan King as Sign Spinner
- Richard Elfman as Homeless Guy
- Joe McDougall as Mailman
- Bonnie Forbes as Puking Lady
- Diana Lado as Waitress
- Leslie Ranne as Waitress
- Aesop Aquarian as Bishop O'Shea

== Recognition ==
=== Reception ===
Variety reported that Sequence "was one of the most-applauded films at October's Sitges", and Twitch Film called the film a "major hit" and a "twisted thriller".

=== Partial awards and nominations ===
- 2013, Won Grand Jury Prize for 'Best Direction' at 24FPS International Short Film Festival for Carles Torrens
- 2013, Won 'Best Actor' at 24FPS International Short Film Festival for Joe Hursley
- 2013, Won 'Best of the Fest Award' at LA Shorts Fest
- 2013, Nominated for Canadian Cinema Editors Award for 'Best Editing in Short Film' for Andrew Coutts
- 2013, Nominated for Maria Award for Best Short Film at Sitges - Catalan International Film Festival
- 2013, Nominated for 'Short Grand Prix' at Warsaw International Film Festival
- 2014, Won International Competition Canal+ Award at Clermont-Ferrand International Short Film Festival
- 2014, Won 'Emerging Cinematographer Award' by International Cinematographers Guild for Kyle Klutz
- 2014, Won Faro de Plata at Festival de Cine de L'Alfàs del Pi
- 2014, Won 'Best Soundtrack' at Semana de Cine de Medina del Campo
- 2014, nominated for Gaudí Award for "Best Short Film" by the Catalan Film Academy
- 2014, nominated for Deadline Award at Landshut Short Film Festival
- 2014, nominated for Silver Biznaga 'Short Films: Special Jury Award' at Málaga Spanish Film Festival
- 2014, Nominated for 'Best Narrative Short' at Tribeca Film Festival
