= Gnomes (2022 film) =

2022 film by Ruwan Heggelman

- Directed by: Ruwan Heggelman
- Written by: Ruwan Heggelman; Jasper ten Hoor; Richard Raaphorst
- Produced by: Richard Raaphorst
- Starring: Moïse Trustfull; Duncan Meijering
- Cinematography: Eron Sheean; Luuk de Kok
- Edited by: Jasper ten Hoor; Ivan Hidayat; Ferrano Meraldi
- Music by: Arend Bruijn
- Production company: Mad Scientists Movement
- Release dates: 13 September 2022 (Lisbon International Horror Film Festival); 9 October 2022 (Sitges International Film Festival of Cataluna)
- Running time: 6 minutes
- Country: Netherlands
- Language: Dutch

Gnomes is a 2022 Dutch short horror-comedy film directed by Ruwan Heggelman, written by Richard Raaphorst, Jasper ten Hoor, and Heggelman, and starring Moïse Trustfull, and Duncan Meijering.

== Synopsis ==
Unknowingly, a girl enters the habitat of a tribe of killer gnomes during her daily run. Lured by mysterious glowing mushrooms, she'll soon wish she'd stayed on her usual tracks.

== Cast ==
- Moïse Trustfull as Female victim
- Duncan Meijering as Male victim

== Production ==
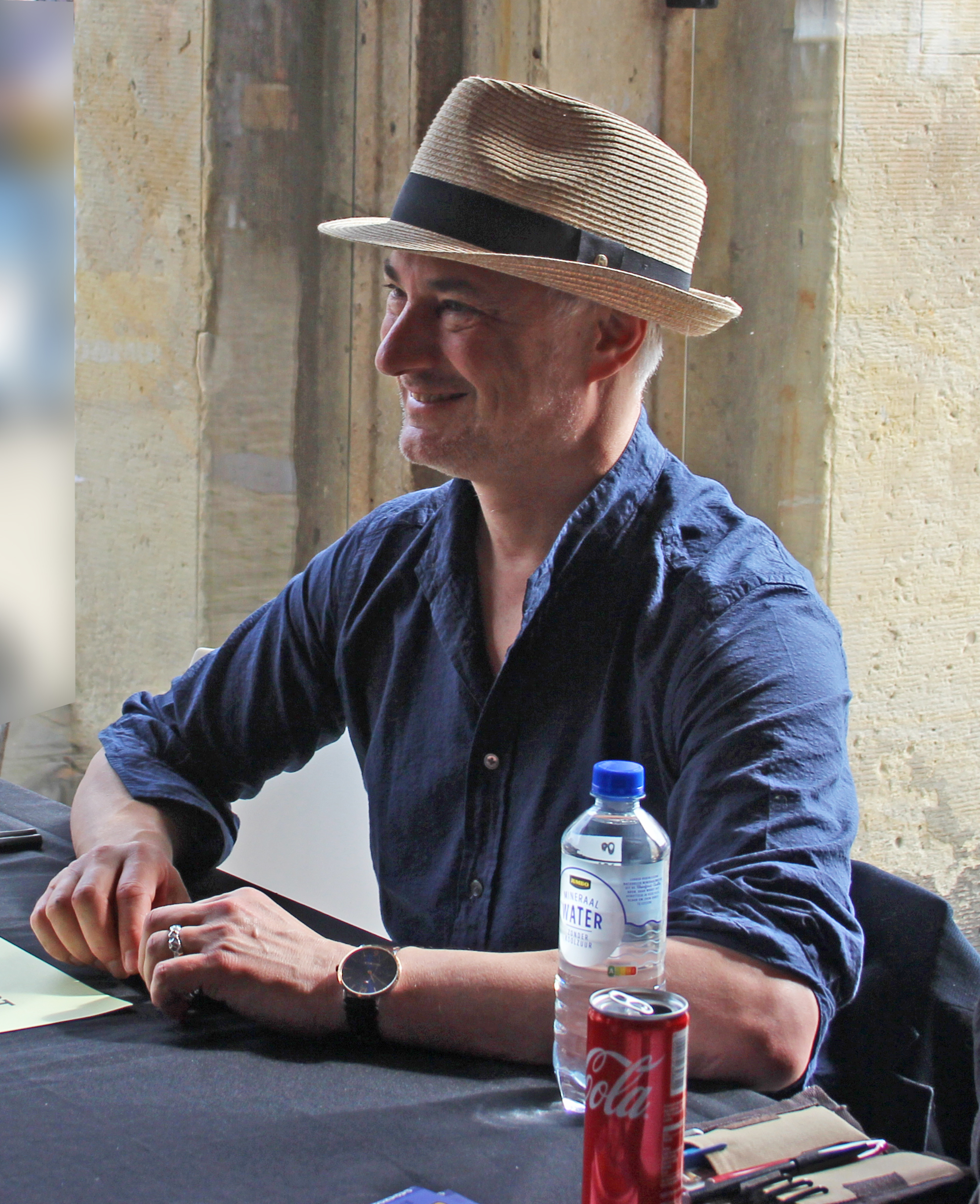
Raaphorst served as a producer for the short film through his production company, Mad Scientists Movement.

Director Ruwan Heggelman has discussed being fascinated by the contrast between innocent folkloric creatures and the violence often present in traditional fairy tales. When developing the film, he drew specifically on the idea of turning familiar garden figures into something "small but dangerous", describing the concept as humorous and unsettling at the same time. Heggelman collaborated with Richard Raaphorst, from Mad Scientists Movement, and who previously worked with handcrafted creature effects in films such as Frankenstein's Army (2013). Filming started in 2021, and they went all-in on practical effects and puppets to make the gnomes feel real on screen.

== Release ==
Gnomes had its North American premiere at the 2022 Fantastic Fest and was also featured in the official selection of the 2022 Frontières Platform at the Marché du Film in Cannes. In February 2023, Sony Pictures acquired the rights to develop the short into a feature‑length film, with 21 Laps Entertainment attached to produce.

== Reception ==
According to DarkVeins, the film immediately transitions from a calm forest setting into a "spiral of violence", using hand-crafted puppets and practical gore effects to create both shock and fascination. The review compares the gnomes' methods to miniature siege warfare, noting how their coordinated traps and improvised tools recall the small but strategic inhabitants of Lilliput in Gulliver's Travels, though here the result is far more graphic and brutal. Hexagore from Letterboxd, described it as a "short Dutch masterpiece", commending its disturbing yet humorous portrayal of forest gnomes and its inventive gory visuals. The cinematography, fairy tale–style soundtrack, and puppet effects were highlighted as standout elements, with the reviewer noting it as "the best and most disturbing rendition of forest gnomes since Rien Poortvliet."
