= Brian Yuzna =

American film director

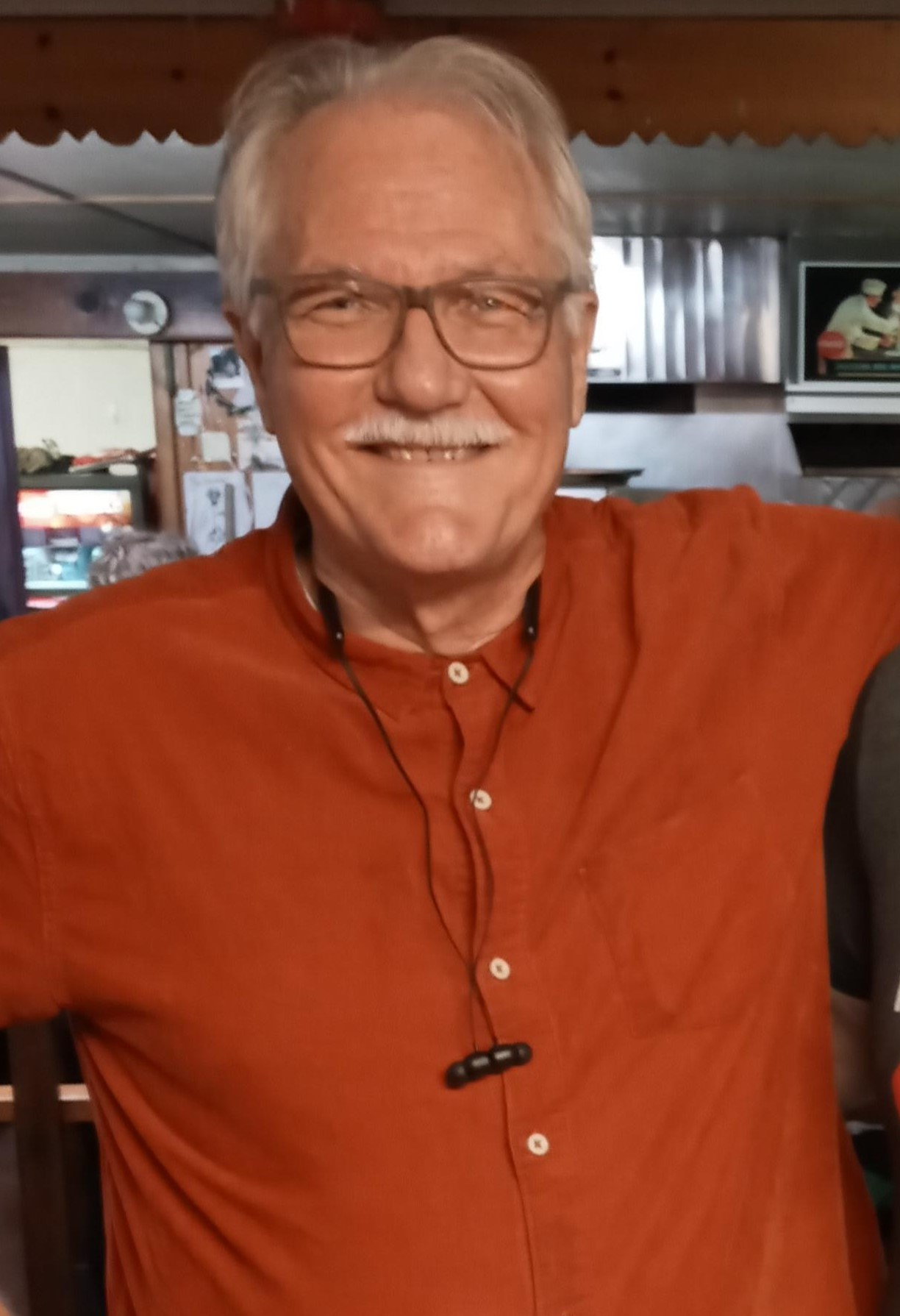
- Yuzna in 2022
- Born: August 30, 1949 (age 76); Manila, Philippines
- Occupations: Film producer; film director; screenwriter
- Spouse: Cathy Cherry Yuzna
- Children: 4, including Logan Yuzna

Brian Yuzna (born August 30, 1949) is an American film producer, director, and writer. He is best known for his work in the science fiction and horror film genres. Yuzna began his career as a producer for several films by director Stuart Gordon, such as Re-Animator (1985) and From Beyond (1986), before making his directorial debut with the satirical body horror film Society (1989).

He also served as a co-writer for the comedy Honey, I Shrunk the Kids (1989). Yuzna was the first American filmmaker to adapt a manga, Bio Booster Armor Guyver, into a live-action feature, The Guyver (1991). He has directed several adaptations of the work of H. P. Lovecraft, and has assisted many first time directors, including Stuart Gordon, Christophe Gans, and Luis De La Madrid, in getting their projects made.

== Early life ==
Yuzna was born in Manila, Philippines, to American parents. He grew up in Nicaragua, Puerto Rico, and Panama, before moving to the United States in the 1960s, settling in Atlanta, Georgia. Yuzna was raised a Roman Catholic. Throughout the 1970s, Yuzna lived on a commune in North Carolina and worked jobs as a carpenter and at a restaurant.

== Career ==
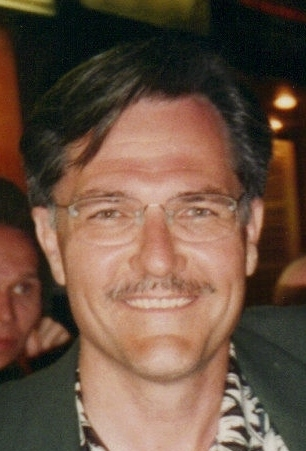
Yuzna in 1996

Yuzna began his career as a producer, co-producing the horror films Re-Animator (1985), From Beyond (1986), and Dolls (1987) for his friend, director Stuart Gordon. He also co-wrote From Beyond. The same year, Yuzna co-wrote the comedy Honey, I Shrunk the Kids alongside Gordon. In 1989, he made his directorial debut with the satirical body horror film Society, which focuses on a wealthy Beverly Hills community who are of a mutant species who feed on the social classes beneath them.

Yuzna went on to direct a series of horror sequels, including Bride of Re-Animator (1990), Silent Night, Deadly Night 4: Initiation (1990), and Return of the Living Dead 3 (1993), before directing The Dentist (1996), a horror film about a murderous Los Angeles dentist who dentally tortures his victims. Yuzna also directed its sequel, The Dentist 2 (1998).

Having collected a large following in Europe, Yuzna started Fantastic Factory, with Julio Fernández, a label under the Barcelona film company Filmax, in the early-2000s. His goal was to produce "modestly budgeted genre (horror, science fiction, fantasy) films for the international market (shot in English language) using genre talent from all around the world and to develop local talent".

He was last working as the producer of the Wehrmacht zombie movie Worst Case Scenario, directed by Richard Raaphorst, which takes place after a fictional World Cup 2006 finale between Germany and Netherlands where Germany loses and seeks revenge with a zombie invasion. In May 2009, it was announced that this project was dead. The film eventually became Frankenstein's Army and was released in 2013. After four years, he returned to the director's chair and filmed Amphibious 3-D which stars Michael Paré and Francis Magee.

In 2014, in Hollywood, the Cinefamily screened and celebrated the 25th anniversary of Honey, I Shrunk the Kids with Yuzna as guest of honor. In 2015, a retrospective of his work of 30 years, Brian Yuzna, A Retrospective, was presented and screened at the theater in the Soho House West Hollywood, curated by Diana Lado and produced by Logan Yuzna. In 2016, a new Yuzna-directed film was announced, The Plastic Surgeon, starring Corbin Bernsen and producer by Yuzna's production house, Dark Arts Entertainment. By the end of 2023, he was working on a novelization of the film Society.

== Distinctions ==
- 2014: Honorary Member of the Catalan Academy of Cinema in Barcelona

== Personal life ==
He is married to Cathy Cherry Yuzna. They have four children: Conan Yuzna, Zoe Yuzna, Noah Yuzna and Logan Yuzna.

== Filmography ==
=== Film ===
Year	Title	Director	Writer	Producer	Notes
1978	Self Portrait in Brains	Yes	Yes	Yes	Co-directed with Jimmy Dobbins
1985	Re-Animator	No	No	Yes	
1986	From Beyond	No	No	Yes	
1986	Dolls	No	No	Yes	
1989	Honey, I Shrunk the Kids	No	Story	Co-producer	
1989	Society	Yes	No	No	
1990	Bride of Re-Animator	Yes	Yes	Yes	
1990	Silent Night, Deadly Night 4: Initiation	Yes	Story	No	Direct-to-video
1991	The Guyver	No	No	Yes	
1991	Silent Night, Deadly Night 5: The Toy Maker	No	Yes	Yes	Direct-to-video
1993	Return of the Living Dead 3	Yes	No	Yes	
1993	Necronomicon	Yes	Yes	Yes	Segments "The Library" and "Whispers"
1995	Crying Freeman	No	No	Yes	
1996	The Dentist	Yes	No	No	
1998	Progeny	Yes	No	No	
1998	The Dentist 2	Yes	No	No	
2000	Faust: Love of the Damned	Yes	No	Yes	
2001	Arachnid	No	No	Yes	
2001	Dagon	No	No	Yes	
2002	Darkness	No	No	Yes	
2003	Beyond Re-Animator	Yes	Uncredited	Yes	
2004	Rottweiler	Yes	No	Yes	
2004	Romasanta	No	No	Yes	
2005	Beneath Still Waters	Yes	No	Yes	
2005	The Nun	No	No	Yes	
2008	Takut: Faces of Fear	No	Story	Yes	
2010	Amphibious	Yes	Yes	Yes	
2011	60 Seconds of Solitude in Year Zero	Yes	No	No	

Executive producer

- Warlock (1989)
- Ticks (1993)
- Worst Case Scenario (2009)
- Suitable Flesh (2023)

Associate producer

- Bloody Bridget (2022)

=== Television ===
Year	Title	Notes
1996	Tarzan: The Epic Adventures	Episode "Tarzan's Return"
1997	Conan the Adventurer	Episode "The Heart of The Elephant”

=== Guest appearances ===
- Stephen King's World of Horror (1986)
- The Incredibly Strange Film Show (1989)
- Fear in the Dark (1991)
- Clive Barker's A-Z of Horror (1997)
- Metrópolis (2001)
- Working with a Master: Stuart Gordon (2006)
- Re-Animator Resurrectus (2007)
- Science of Horror (2008)
- Nightmares in Red, White and Blue (2009)

== Bibliography ==
- Crussells, Magí (2009). Directores de cine en Cataluña: de la A a la Z (in Catalan). Barcelona, Spain: Edicions Universitat Barcelona. ISBN 9788447533169.
- Towlson, Jon (2014). Subversive Horror Cinema: Countercultural Messages of Films from Frankenstein to the Present. Jefferson, North Carolina: McFarland. ISBN 9780786474691.
