= Richard Raaphorst =

Dutch filmmaker (born 1971)

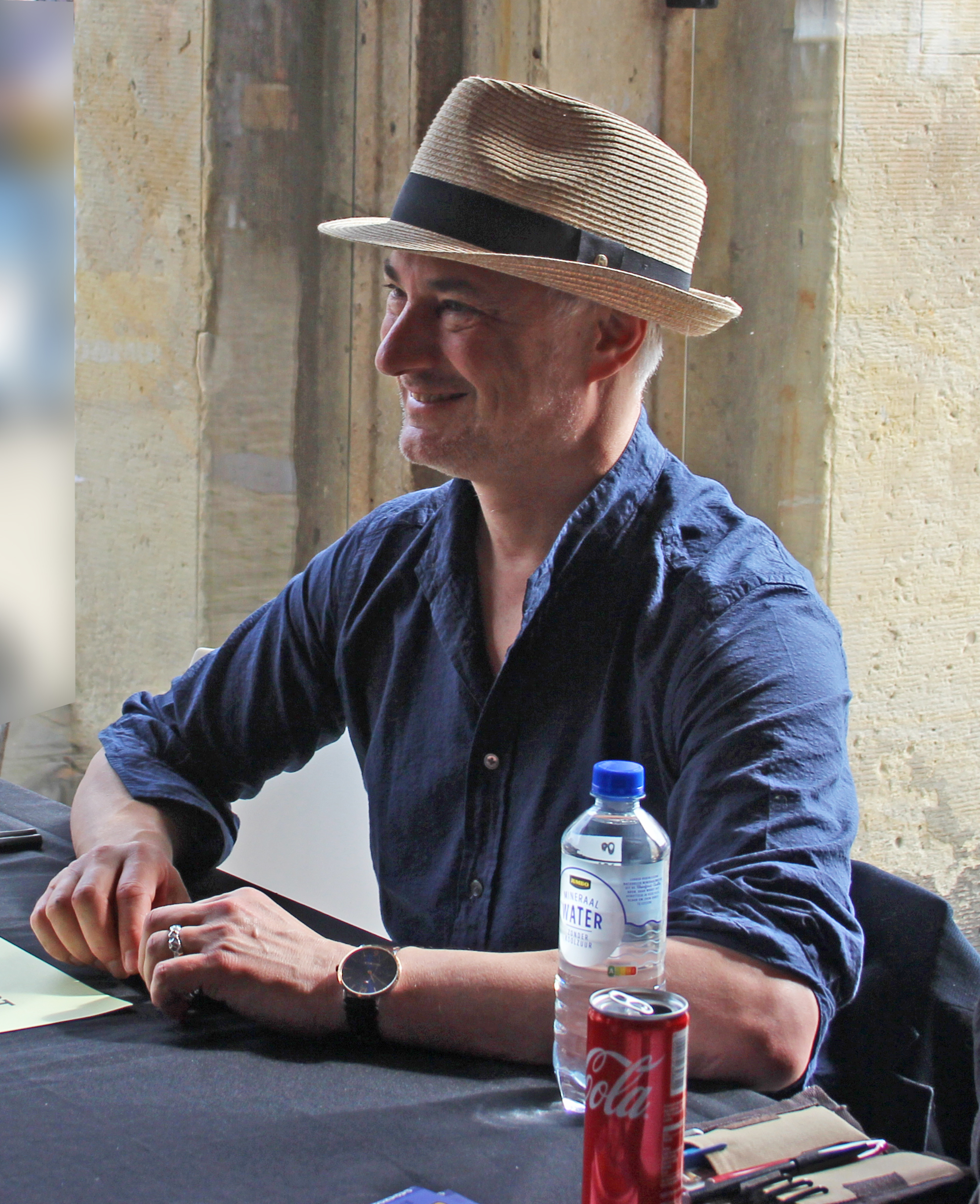
- Raaphorst in 2023
- Born: Richard Raaphorst; 21 June 1971 (age 55); Rotterdam, Netherlands
- Education: Willem de Kooning Academy
- Occupations: Film director, writer, storyboard artist
- Years active: 1995–present

Richard Raaphorst (born 21 June 1971) is a Dutch film director, screenwriter, and storyboard artist. He is best known as the co-writer and director of the feature film Frankenstein's Army (2013).

Before graduating in 1996, Raaphorst created several independent short films, including Zombi 1 (1995) and began work on his project concept Worst Case Scenario. However, the film adaptation originally planned to release in 2008 was cancelled due to financial problems. He has collaborated with several filmmakers, including horror film producer and director Brian Yuzna.

Raaphorst also began his career in 1998 as a storyboard artist on Who Am I?, directed by Jackie Chan. He later worked on horror films such as Faust: Love of the Damned (2000), Dagon (2001), Beyond Re-Animator (2003) Fragile (2005), and Black Book (2006). In 2008, he served as storyboard artist, second-unit director, and concept artist for The Silent Army, directed by Jean van de Velde. His more recent works include Late Phases (2014), Blood Red Sky (2021), Brooklyn 45 (2023), and Infinity Pool (2023).

== Early life ==
Richard Raaphorst was born in Rotterdam, South Holland, Netherlands. His father worked for an oil company and once took him to the job site, where he was impressed by the size of the machinery. Raaphorst studied at the Willem de Kooning Academy and graduated in 1996, where he directed Zombi 1 as part of his studies. He also attended Graphic Lyceum, a vocational school in Rotterdam.

== Career ==
=== 1990s and 2000s ===
Raaphorst began his career in the film industry after graduating in 1996. His graduation project, the short film Zombi 1, was released on 14 June 1995 in the film anthology Nether Horror Collection. He started developing Worst Case Scenario in the early 2000s, releasing a proof of concept in 2004. In 2006, Gorehound Inc. released a teaser and a limited promotional trailer for the film on DVD in 2008 and was nominated for a Golden Trailer Award in 2005 in the category of "Best Movie Trailer". However, due to numerous financial difficulties, the film was ultimately canceled in March 2009 before its completion.

In 2008, Raaphorst wrote and directed the Dutch short drama film Popo, starring Victor Löw in the title role as a clown with psychological problems. The film premiered on 11 April 2008 in the Netherlands. Popo was later selected for the Nederhorror Short Film Festival, held on 22 March 2009 at Cinema OT301 in Amsterdam, where it competed alongside nine other Dutch horror shorts, and it was screened at the Rotterdams Open Doek Festival in 2016.

=== 2010s ===
In 2012, Raaphorst directed the short film The Rocketeer starring Stephan Evenblij and Pauline Greidanus. The film premiered at the 2012 Netherlands Film Festival and was later screened at the International Film Festival Rotterdam.

Following the collapse of the Worst Case Scenario project, Raaphorst proposed a new story using some of the concepts and designs, set in 1945, exploring the final stages of World War II in the German–Polish borderlands. The film was intended as a prequel to Worst Case Scenario, titled Army of Frankenstein, and would have focused on Wehrmacht soldiers reinforced by zombie troops. The concept was later renamed and reworked into Frankenstein's Army, with a screenplay written by Chris W. Mitchell and Miguel Tejada-Flores. The found-footage film was released on 26 July 2013 worldwide and later became available for streaming on 10 March 2014. Raaphorst earned a Special Mention in the Official Fantàstic Panorama competition (Méliès d'Argent) at the 2013 Sitges Catalan International Film Festival for directing Frankenstein's Army.

In 2016, outside of his film projects, Raaphorst worked with Pedri Animation, an animation studio, where he directed an origami animation commercial for the Dutch company Independer. The animation was produced by Elmer Kaan and Sergio Lara Jimenez. He also directed a series of clay animation commercials for the Dutch online bank Moneyou. A total of eleven clay-animated clips were created, all directed by him and animated by Elmer Kaan. In 2017, Raaphorst directed and co-wrote The Profundis with Shane Berryhill, also serving as the film's producer. The project won the Pitch Contest at the Imagine Film Festival.

=== 2020s ===
In 2020, Raaphorst attempted to revive his abandoned project Worst Case Scenario by launching a crowdfunding campaign for a graphic novel adaptation of the story. It was later reported in early May 2023 that the completed 144-page graphic novel was presented at "Strips op de Markt", a comics market event.

In 2021, Raaphorst, head of the special effects group Mad Scientists Movement, was enlisted by filmmaker Jan van Gorkum to contribute to the short film Shiny New World. For his special effects work on the film, Raaphorst received an award at the ToHorror Film Fest in Italy. On 10 May 2021, Raaphorst claimed that the design of a boss monster in Capcom's Resident Evil Village resembled a creature from his 2013 film, Frankenstein's Army. He stated that the design was used without authorization or credit, calling it a "one to one" copy. Raaphorst explained in an interview with Eurogamer that he doesn't expect to receive any royalties from Capcom. Although the game appears to draw inspiration from Frankenstein's Army, he doesn't actually own the rights to the film. Those belong to MPI Media Group, the U.S.-based company that helped finance and distribute the movie when he partnered with to get the project made.

In early 2025, Raaphorst and writer Eron Sheean announced that their upcoming film Möbius had entered pre-production, with principal photography scheduled to begin in the summer in the Netherlands. The film was being developed by Raaphorst's Mad Scientists collective in collaboration with Brandon Cronenberg and Rob Vermeulen (under Holland Harbour Entertainment BV), and has received support from the Dutch Film Fund. That same year, Raaphorst was announced to return to feature filmmaking with Children of the Moor. The project was presented at the Frontières Platform at the Marché du Film in Cannes, an industry event supported by Canada's Fantasia Festival and the Marché du Film. The film was backed by Raaphorst's creative collective, The Mad Scientists, in collaboration with 52 Films, a U.K.-based production company headed by screenwriter Adam Park. The principal photography for Children of the Moor was scheduled to begin in spring 2026.

== Filmmaking style ==
=== Style and themes ===
Raaphorst has expressed a strong preference for practical effects over CGI, criticizing the overuse of digital enhancements in modern filmmaking for producing artificial and lifeless imagery. He often applies an "oil painting" approach to filmmaking, building visual richness through layered practical elements. His signature "zombots" (zombie‑robots) stem from a lifelong fascination with industrial machinery and repurposed found objects, especially influenced by early experiments in which he transformed dolls into robot-like puppets. A recurring narrative motif in Raaphorst's films described as "the marriage of war and grotesque fantasy." In Frankenstein's Army, for instance, the Nazi-industrial setting is populated with monstrous, steam-powered creatures built from human corpses and scrap metal. According to an interview with Raaphorst by Film International, the aesthetic of Frankenstein's Army is described as Dieselpunk rather than Steampunk, with the industrial technologies of the era serving as direct sources of inspiration. He has also described his interest in using the language of propaganda and gaming in his films.

=== Influences ===
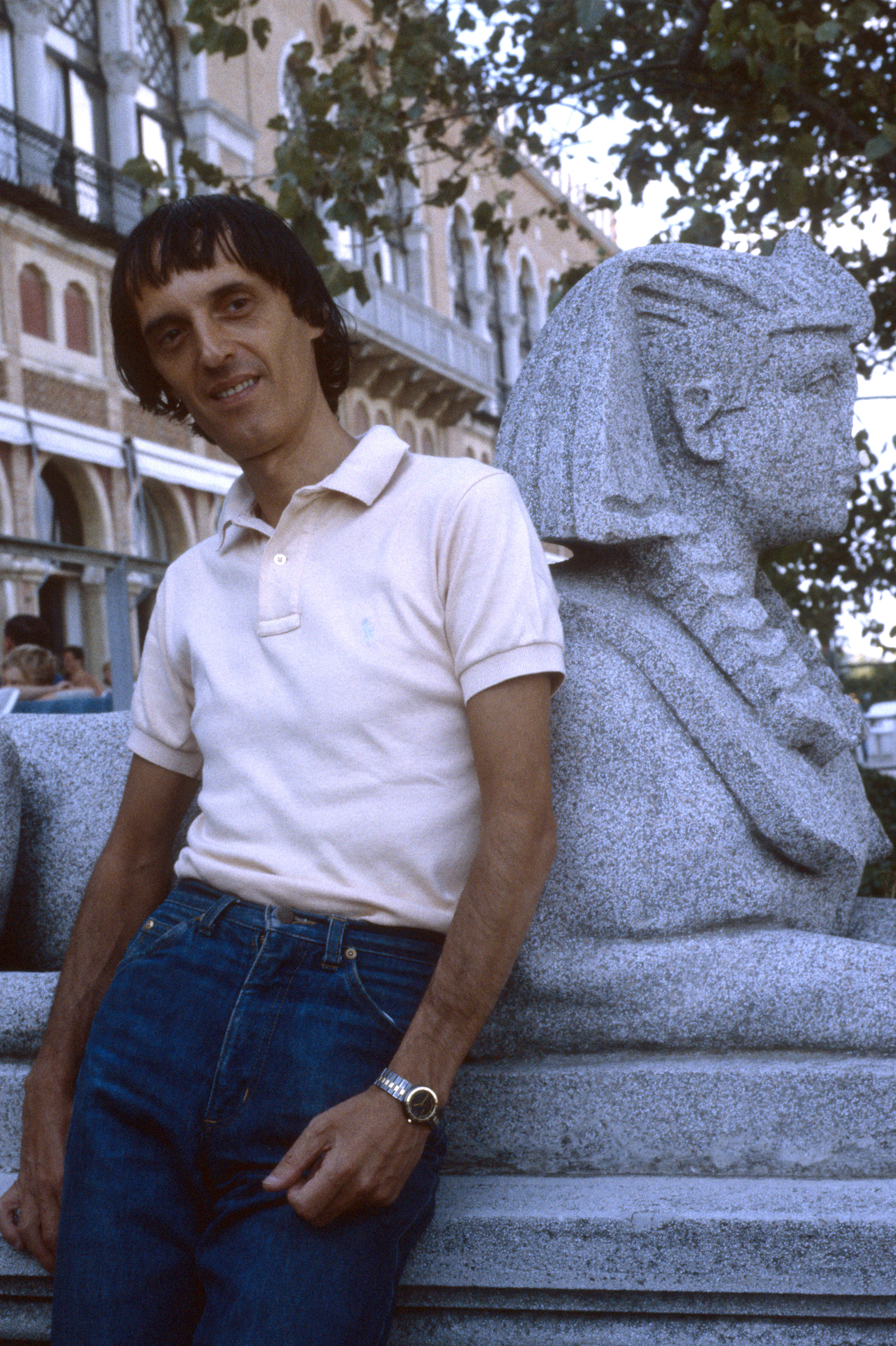
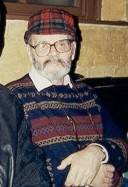
Italian horror directors Dario Argento (left) and Lucio Fulci (right), both of whom Raaphorst has identified as major influences on his visual style and approach to genre storytelling.

Raaphorst has cited a wide range of influences, from horror cinema to animation and industrial design. He has named filmmakers such as Peter Jackson, Terry Gilliam, David Cronenberg, and Italian horror directors Dario Argento and Lucio Fulci as key inspirations for both style and storytelling. He cited John Carpenter's The Thing (1982) as a major influence on Frankenstein's Army, particularly for its use of practical effects and creature design. He expressed admiration for David Lynch's surreal and unsettling aesthetics, highlighting works like Eraserhead (1977) as formative influences on his own visual approach. He also named the Japanese animated film Akira (1988) as one of his all-time favorites.

== Selected filmography ==
Short and full-length films directed, produced, or written by Richard Raaphorst
Year	Title	Director	Writer	Producer	Ref.
1995	Zombi 1	Yes	Yes	No	
2007	Eigen wereld	No	Yes	No	
2008	Worst Case Scenario	Yes	No	No	
2008	Popo	Yes	Yes	No	
2012	The Rocketeer	Yes	Yes	No	
2013	Frankenstein's Army	Yes	Yes	No	
2017	The Profundis	Yes	Yes	Yes	
2022	Gnomes	No	Yes	Yes	
2023	The UFOs of Soesterberg	No	No	Yes	
TBA	Möbius	Yes	No	No	
TBA	Children of the Moor	Yes	No	No	

== Awards and nominations ==
Raaphorst has received recognition at several international genre film festivals for his work as a director and special effects artist.

Year	Film	Award / Festival	Category	Result	Ref.
2005	Worst Case Scenario	Golden Trailer Awards	Best Movie Trailer	Nominated	
2013	Frankenstein's Army	Sitges – Catalonian International Film Festival	Grand Prize of European Fantastic Film (Silver) – Special Mention	Won	
2017	The Profundis	Imagine Film Festival	Pitch Contest Winner	Won	
2021	Shiny New World	ToHorror Film Fest (Italy)	Best Special Effects	Won	
