= Zombi (film series) =

Films derived from Dawn of the Dead or Zombi 2

- Directed by: George A. Romero; Lucio Fulci; Others
- Release dates: 1978 (Zombi); 1979 (Zombi 2); 1988 (Zombi 3)
- Countries: Italy; United States; United Kingdom; Thailand; Australia; Germany; Spain; Netherlands; Korea
- Languages: Italian; English; Others

The Zombi series refers collectively to horror films that have been marketed, in various territories, as sequels to either George A. Romero's Italian-American film Dawn of the Dead (1978) or Lucio Fulci's Italian film Zombi 2 (1979). The latter was itself marketed by Italian distributors as a sequel to the former. A confusing history has emerged from the practice of reworking films as Zombi movies for release in different countries, a process during which a film may be given a different title in each country where it is released. In Britain and Thailand, these films were released as the Zombie Flesh Eaters series. In North America and Germany, the films became known as the Zombie series. The films maintained their original spelling, Zombi, when released in Australia and other select countries.

The Zombi series began when Romero's Dawn of the Dead film (released in European countries as Zombi) was re-edited by Dario Argento and re-scored by Goblin for its Italian and wider European releases. Following the film's success, a zombie film by Lucio Fulci was commissioned and titled Zombi 2, to appear as a sequel. A series of increasingly tenuous efforts by various producers to capitalize on the Zombi name in multiple countries ensued.

== Series by region ==
=== Italian series ===
The Italian series starts with Dawn of the Dead and is followed by Zombi 2 and its officially-released sequels.

- Zombi (1978) (original title: Dawn of the Dead)
- Zombi 2 (1979)
- Zombi 3 (1988)

=== British series ===
In the U.K., the series is known as Zombie Flesh Eaters. While it follows the Italian series in proper order, it ignores Dawn of the Dead as the first entry, and instead starts with Zombi 2, adding the unrelated film Oltre la morte as a third installment.

- Zombie Flesh Eaters (1979) (Italian title: Zombi 2)
- Zombie Flesh Eaters 2 (1988) (Italian title: Zombi 3)
- Zombie Flesh Eaters 3 (1989) (Italian title: Oltre la morte, a.k.a. After Death)

=== German series ===
The German series, like the Italian series, starts off with Dawn of the Dead, but ignores Fulci's Zombi 2 (which was released separately as Woodoo), and instead continues with Day of the Dead and the Italian Zombi 3.

- Zombie (1979) (original title: Dawn of the Dead)
- Zombie 2: Das Letzte Kapitel (1985) (original title: Day of the Dead)
- Zombie III (1988) (Italian title: Zombi 3)

=== Thai series ===
The Thai Zombi series follows the titling and numbering of the British series, but adds the unrelated film Killing Birds with the new title, Zombie Flesh Eaters 4.

- Zombie Flesh Eaters (1979) (Italian title: Zombi 2)
- Zombie Flesh Eaters 2 (1988) (Italian title: Zombi 3)
- Zombie Flesh Eaters 3 (1989) (Italian title: Oltre la morte, a.k.a. After Death)
- Zombie Flesh Eaters 4 (1988) (Italian title: Uccelli assassini, a.k.a. Killing Birds)

=== Australian series ===
The Australian version of the series uses roman numerals and is composed of sequels only, most of which are re-titled Italian films. However, one exclusive installment was produced titled Zombi VIII: Urban Decay in 2020. The series starts off with Zombi IV: Bakterion and concludes with Zombi VIII: Urban Decay.

- Zombi IV: Bakterion (1982) (original title: Panic, a.k.a. Bakterion)
- Zombi V: Vengeance (1973) (original title: Vengeance of The Zombies)
- Zombi VI: The Mirage (1981) (original title: Dawn of The Mummy)
- Zombi VII: Last Rites (1975) (original title: Night of The Seagulls)
- Zombi VIII: Urban Decay (2020)

=== American series ===
Although the American series begins with Zombi 2 and continues in the established sequence, some of the films were re-titled again and the titles do not follow in numerical order. Zombi 2 was renamed Zombie, but Zombi 3 was renamed Zombie 3 rather than Zombie 2. Two additional films were released on home video with titles that would imply that they were sequels, but which had nothing to do with the Italian series. The American-produced Zombi 9: The Survivor is a direct sequel to the Australian-produced Zombi VIII: Urban Decay.

- Zombie (1979) (Italian title: Zombi 2)
- Zombie 3 (1988) (Italian title: Zombi 3)
- Zombie 4: After Death (1989) (Italian title: Oltre la morte, a.k.a. After Death)
- Zombie 5: Killing Birds (1987) (Italian title: Uccelli assassini, a.k.a. Killing Birds)
- Zombi 9: The Survivor (2025)

In the 1990s, several unrelated titles were released as Zombie sequels by T-Z Video (a.k.a. Edde Entertainment).
These titles were as follows:

- Zombie (1979) (original Italian title: Zombi 2)
- Zombie 2 (1988) (original Italian title: Zombi 3)
- Zombie 3: Return of the Zombies (1973) (original Spanish title: La orgía de los muertos, a.k.a. The Hanging Woman, starring Paul Naschy and directed by José Luis Merino)
- Zombie 4: A Virgin Among the Living Dead (1973) (original French title: Christina, princesse de l'érotisme)
- Zombie 5: Revenge in the House of Usher (1982) (original Spanish title: El Hundimiento de la Casa Usher a.k.a. Revenge in the House of Usher)
- Zombie 6: Monster Hunter (1981) (original title: Absurd, which is itself a pseudo-sequel to Joe D'Amato's Antropophagus)
- Zombie 7 (1980) (original title: Antropophagus, a.k.a. The Grim Reaper)

=== Other films ===
- Let Sleeping Corpses Lie (1974) has also been released as Zombi 3.
- Zombie Holocaust (1980), a.k.a. Doctor Butcher, M.D., has also been released as Zombie 3 – the film stars Ian McCulloch, who appeared in Zombi 2.
- Hell of the Living Dead (1980), was also released as Zombi 4 and Zombi 5: Ultimate Nightmare.
- Nightmare City (1980) has also been released as Zombi 3.
- Andrea Bianchi's Le notti del terrore (1981), a.k.a. Burial Ground, has also been released as Zombie 3.
- Oasis of the Zombies (1982), a.k.a. The Abyss of the Living Dead, was also released as Zombi VI.
- Panic (1982), a.k.a. Bakterion, is known as Zombie 4 in Greece.
- Andreas Schnaas' Zombie '90: Extreme Pestilence (1991), a.k.a. Zombie 2001: Battle Royale, has also been released as Zombi 7.
- Zombie 1 (1995), a.k.a. Zombi 1, is a short film by Dutch director Richard Raaphorst available on the film anthology Nether Horror Collection.
- Variant (2020), a short film directed by Joe Meredith, was also released as Zombie 8 and Zombie VIII: Variant.
