= Popo (film) =

2008 Dutch film by Richard Raaphorst

- In the conclusion, after falling from a building, Popo imagines being celebrated by a cheering crowd, unaware that he is actually injured.
- Directed by: Richard Raaphorst
- Written by: Richard Raaphorst; Marc Bennink; David de Winter
- Produced by: Herman Slagter; Ruud Boel
- Starring: Victor Löw
- Cinematography: Gábor Deák
- Edited by: Martin Heijgelaar
- Music by: Reyn Ouwehand
- Production company: White Bull Film
- Release dates: 11 April 2008 (Amsterdam Fantastic Film Festival); 22 August 2008 (Espoo Film Festival)
- Running time: 10 minutes
- Country: Netherlands
- Language: Dutch / Minimal dialogue

Popo (or also titled Popo the Clown) is a 2008 Dutch short comedy-drama film written and directed by Richard Raaphorst. The story follows a clown named Popo (Victor Löw), who always wears makeup to conceal his badly disfigured face and underlying psychological issues, and who aspires to live what he considers a beautiful life.

== Plot ==
A clown named Popo had a bad day, after a man kicked him out and when Popo went to his car the man threw something at it. Popo drove his home, feeling frustrated, he took off his clown costume and sat quietly in his bathroom trying to calm himself.

The next day, Popo was hired by woman to perform at a children's party, he tried to make the children enjoy themselves but his act went wrong and the children were not happy, leaving him feeling disappointed. When he returned home, Popo was still frustrated after his work at the party went badly. He picked up a magazine and saw an article about plastic surgery which he thought might make his life better.

Popo went to a clinic and waited for his turn, when his name was called, he noticed a picture frame of a little girl, which reminded him about his work as a clown and the reason why people especially children, make him feel worse. The doctor told him that nothing could be done to change his appearance.

Later, Popo went to the roof of a building holding a balloon, he blew it up but it slipped from his hands, as he tried to catch it he stumbled and fell several times bouncing in a strange playful way, he finally landed in a pile of trash, people around him cheered and for the first time in days, Popo felt happy even though it was only in his imagination and he was actually injured.

== Cast ==
- Victor Löw as Popo
- Ursul de Geer

== Production ==
Richard Raaphorst directed the film, which was shot in the Netherlands. Photographer Raphael Lachaud documented the filming process, and his behind-the-scenes images were later displayed in the 2009 exhibition En passant in Gouda, South Holland.

== Release ==
Popo premiered on April 11, 2008 in the Netherlands. It was later selected for the Nederhorror Short Film Festival, held on 22 March 2009 at Cinema OT301 in Amsterdam, where it competed alongside nine Dutch horror shorts. In June 2016, Popo was screened at the Rotterdams Open Doek Festival.

== Reception ==
Popo was screened in 2015 as part of the five-year anniversary program of the Rotterdams Open Doek Festival. Writing for Filmkrant, the film was described as "the tragic Popo, presenting a clown who hides his psychological problems behind his clown costume."
