= Autómata =

2014 science fiction film

- Theatrical release poster
- Directed by: Gabe Ibáñez
- Written by: Gabe Ibáñez; Igor Legaretta Gomez; Javier Sanchez Donate
- Produced by: Danny Lerner; Les Weldon; Antonio Banderas; Sandra Hermida
- Starring: Antonio Banderas; Birgitte Hjort Sørensen; Dylan McDermott; Robert Forster; Tim McInnerny; Melanie Griffith
- Cinematography: Alejandro Martinez
- Edited by: Sergio Rozas
- Music by: Zacarías M. de la Riva
- Production companies: Nu Boyana; Green Moon España
- Distributed by: A Contracorriente Films
- Release dates: September 20, 2014 (San Sebastián Int'l Film Festival); October 17, 2014 (Bulgaria); January 23, 2015 (Spain)
- Running time: 110 minutes
- Countries: Spain; Bulgaria
- Language: English
- Budget: US$15 million

Autómata is a 2014 English-language Spanish-Bulgarian science fiction action film directed by Gabe Ibáñez starring Antonio Banderas (who also co-produced). The film is co-written by Ibáñez with Igor Legarreta and Javier Sánchez Donate, and co-stars Birgitte Hjort Sørensen, Melanie Griffith, Dylan McDermott, Robert Forster, and Tim McInnerny.

== Plot ==
About 20 years before the story takes place, solar flares irradiate the Earth, killing over 99% of the world's population. The survivors gather in a network of safe cities and build primitive humanoid robots, called Pilgrims, to help rebuild and operate in the harsh environment. These robots have two unchangeable protocols: They cannot harm any form of life and may not repair, modify, or alter themselves or other robots in any way. Initially seen as humankind's salvation, they are relegated to manual labor when they fail to stop the advance of desertification. Society has regressed due to the lack of technology besides the Pilgrims, as a lack of functional aircraft or other transport prevents travel and cars are a rare commodity, putting humanity on the brink of extinction.

In 2044, Jacq Vaucan—an insurance investigator for ROC, the company that manufactures Pilgrims—investigates a report from Wallace, a police officer who shot a robot he claims was modifying itself. As Jacq looks for a robot they suspect was stealing parts, it leads him outside the city. When he finds it inside a shipping container, it sets itself on fire. As he and a team open up the burned robot to see what it was hiding, they discover the robot had a rare nuclear battery that could power a robot indefinitely. They are able to power up the robot once more, but when he asks it why it set itself on fire, it burns out again.

Jacq salvages the remains and speculates to Robert, his boss and brother-in-law, that there may be a "clocksmith", someone who illegally modifies robots, who is overriding the second protocol. Incredulous, Robert rejects this possibility, but offers Jacq a transfer out of the city if he can find evidence. Jacq had asked for the transfer to a city on the coast, because he feared raising his unborn child in the decaying city, even though Robert is skeptical whether the ocean still exists. Jacq's pregnant wife, Rachel, initially rejects his plans, but she eventually relents.

Jacq and Wallace investigate a brothel, where they find Cleo, a modified robot that Wallace subsequently shoots in the leg. When Jacq objects, Wallace says that Cleo's owner will lead them to the clocksmith; Wallace also threatens to kill Jacq if he does not split the proceeds of the battery on the black market. Jacq follows Cleo's owner to a clocksmith named Dr. Susan Dupré, who claims not to know who altered Cleo, an action that would destroy Cleo's CPU. Jacq leaves the burned robot's CPU with her and offers to give her the battery if she can locate information on the clocksmith. When Dupré installs the modified CPU in Cleo, Cleo begins self-repairing. Dupré contacts Jacq, who alerts Robert; however, ROC intercepts Jacq's message and sends a team of assassins to Dupré's laboratory.

Dupré is killed, but Jacq escapes in a car driven by Cleo. When Cleo takes them into a maze of stanchions, both cars crash; the assassins are killed, and Jacq is injured. Cleo takes Jacq with her into the desert, where they are joined by three other robots, none of whom will obey Jacq's orders. However, the first protocol forces them to prevent his death. Desperate to return to the city to be with his pregnant wife, Jacq makes contact with Robert, who sends Wallace to recover him. Wallace threatens Jacq's life and destroys two of the robots, who have objected to his actions; Jacq kills Wallace with a flare gun before he can also destroy Cleo. Wallace's partner flees after taking a battery from one of the robots.

Robert's boss discloses that the predecessor to the first Pilgrim was a quantum mind created with no security protocols and no artificial restraints on its computational power. Before they deactivated it, its makers tasked it with designing the security protocols that govern Pilgrims. Robert's boss informs Robert that no one has been able to break Pilgrim security protocols, because they were created by the unrestricted quantum mind and ROC purposefully limited the computational power of all subsequent AI. ROC forces Robert to accompany a team sent to kill Jacq and the unknown clocksmith before the robots can evolve further beyond human understanding. When Robert objects to their kidnapping Jacq's wife and baby daughter, Conway, the leader, shoots him and leaves him for dead. Meanwhile, Jacq meets the robot responsible for modifying the others. The robot says that he and the other robots plan to go to the radioactive area where humans cannot go. Initially skeptical, Jacq eventually accepts that the robot naturally evolved, like humanity. The robot cannot understand why Jacq is afraid of dying, as death is a normal part of human living, just as the impending extinction of humanity is normal. "No lifeform can inhabit the planet eternally." It points out that the androids were conceived of and built by humans, so humanity will continue to exist through the robots that they created. Accepting this, Jacq gives them his battery, which they use to complete a new design, a sort of dog/insect robot. The robots repair a vehicle for Jacq, and he leaves for the city.

When Conway reaches the robot outpost, he destroys two of the four robots. Jacq finds the dying Robert and returns to the outpost as Conway wounds Cleo and kills the evolved robot. Jacq kills all ROC assassins except for Conway, though he is further wounded in the battle. As Conway prepares to kill Jacq, the new robot saves his life by pushing Conway off a cliff in violation of the first protocol. Jacq fears the uninhibited robot will now attack him and prepares to shoot it, only to lower his weapon as his wife arrives with their child. He works the crane so Cleo and the new robot can cross to the other side of the canyon into the irradiated area. Jacq and his wife take a car and drive toward the city on the coast. Jacq appears to be dying of his injuries, but takes comfort in their child. As she drives Rachel suddenly breaks out into a smile and tells Jacq she can see the ocean ahead.

== Cast ==
- Antonio Banderas as Jacq Vaucan
- Birgitte Hjort Sørensen as Rachel Vaucan
- Melanie Griffith as Dr. Susan Dupré and voice of Cleo
- Dylan McDermott as Wallace
- Robert Forster as Robert Bold
- Tim McInnerny as Vernon Conway
- Andy Nyman as Ellis
- David Ryall as Dominic Hawk
- Andrew Tiernan as Manager
- Christa Campbell as Tech #2
- Bashar Rahal as Doctor
- Javier Bardem as Blue Robot
- Christina Tam as Morgue Tech

== Production ==
Banderas expressed an early interest in the film after reading the script. Banderas, as producer, brought on Griffith, his wife at the time, and Bardem, who was cast in a minor role and as the voice of the Blue Robot. The film was shot at Nu Boyana Film Studios in Sofia, Bulgaria.

== Reception ==
Rotten Tomatoes, a review aggregator, reports that 30% of 33 surveyed critics gave the film a positive review; the average rating was 5.27/10. The site's summary states of the film: "Beautiful to look at but narratively hollow, Autómata short-circuits its handful of intriguing ideas with an overload of sci-fi clichés." Metacritic rated it 37/100 based on 13 reviews. Jay Weissberg of Variety called it "a dystopic mess" that borrows from numerous science fiction films. Jonathan Holland of The Hollywood Reporter wrote: "The overwrought, uncontrolled sci-fi thriller Automata is a disappointing example of a film that lacks the imagination to follow persuasively through on its engaging initial premise."

Stan Schröder remarked on the influence of Philip K. Dick's novel Do Androids Dream of Electric Sheep? (which served as the basis for the popular Blade Runner film) and Isaac Asimov's short story "Runaround" which introduced Asimov's "Three Laws of Robotics", which are close to the film's "robot protocols".

== See also ==
- Artificial consciousness – Hypothetical consciousness in artificial systems
- Artificial general intelligence – Type of hypothetical AI with wide-ranging abilities
- Technological singularity – Hypothetical event
- Three Laws of Robotics – Fictional set of rules by Isaac Asimov
