= Pet (film) =

2016 film directed by Carles Torrens

- Theatrical release poster
- Directed by: Carles Torrens
- Written by: Jeremy Slater
- Produced by: Nick Phillips; Kelly Martin Wagner
- Starring: Dominic Monaghan; Ksenia Solo; Jennette McCurdy
- Cinematography: Timothy A. Burton
- Edited by: Elena Ruiz
- Music by: Zacarías M. de la Riva
- Production companies: Revolver Picture Company; Magic Lantern
- Distributed by: Orion Pictures; Samuel Goldwyn Films (United States); Magic Lantern (Spain)
- Release dates: March 11, 2016 (SXSW); December 2, 2016 (United States); June 16, 2017 (Spain)
- Running time: 94 minutes
- Countries: United States; Spain
- Language: English
- Box office: $10,900

Pet is a 2016 psychological thriller film directed by Carles Torrens and written by Jeremy Slater. The film stars Dominic Monaghan, Ksenia Solo, and Jennette McCurdy.

Pet premiered at South by Southwest on March 11, 2016 and was released in the United States on December 2 by Orion Pictures and Samuel Goldwyn Films. The film received mixed reviews from critics.

== Plot ==
Seth is a severely introverted man who works at an animal control center. He develops an obsession with Holly, a waitress and former high school classmate of his, after seeing her writing in her journal on the bus. Seth seeks advice from security guard Nate, who tells him to be confident and approach her. Seth extensively researches Holly's online profiles and tries to ask her out, but she rebuffs him. At home, Holly tells her friend Claire about Seth before taking a drunken phone call from her ex-boyfriend, Eric.

Holly receives a bouquet at work the next day. Assuming the flowers are from Eric, she goes to the bar where he works. Seth, who has been following her, confronts her, leading to a physical confrontation when he refuses to accept her rejection. Eric attacks Seth, but Seth is able to steal Holly's journal, which he spends the next several days reading. At work, Seth discovers a trapdoor to a room in an abandoned wing of the animal shelter, where he sets about constructing a steel cage. He follows Holly home, breaks into her apartment, and kidnaps her.

After awakening in the cage, Holly speaks to an image of Claire and vows to survive. Seth informs Holly that he loves her and has imprisoned her to "save" her. Through reading Holly's journal, Seth learned that Claire and Eric had an affair. Holly confronted Claire during a car ride, angrily continuing to accelerate until they collided with a truck. Although injured, Claire survived the wreck, but Holly fatally stabbed her with a glass shard; Claire's death was attributed to the crash. Since then, Holly has committed a series of gruesome murders and written about them in her journal, leading to Seth finding a "purpose" in life by preventing Holly from hurting anyone else.

Over the next several days, they engage in psychological mind games against each other as Holly begins to slip details to draw Seth in. Seth maintains that Holly committed the other murders out of guilt for getting away with Claire's murder, but Holly counters that she kills simply for pleasure. A suspicious Nate follows Seth and discovers Holly. She distracts Nate so that Seth has time to overpower him. At Holly's urging, he smashes Nate's skull with a cinder block, then follows her instructions to dispose of the body.

The police become suspicious of Seth's role in Nate's disappearance. Holly convinces him that he can save her if he proves his love to her by cutting off his finger. He complies, but Holly grabs his knife and threatens to kill herself if he doesn't release her. She says she finally believes that he loves her before slitting his throat.

Some time later, Holly is back together with Eric, and the events from her journal have been turned into a series of fictional stories published by a vanity press. Holly finds evidence that Eric is cheating again, but declines to hurt him. Instead, she travels to a warehouse, where it is revealed that Seth is being kept in a cage, still alive but horribly mutilated and tortured; she thanks him for "saving" her by allowing her to take out all of her murderous impulses on him instead.

== Cast ==
- Dominic Monaghan as Seth
- Ksenia Solo as Holly
- Jennette McCurdy as Claire
- Nathan Parsons as Eric
- Da'Vone McDonald as Nate

== Production ==
Slater sold the script for the film in March 2007.

It was announced in August 2015 that filming had begun with actors Dominic Monaghan, Ksenia Solo, Jennette McCurdy, and Nathan Parsons.

== Release ==
The film premiered at the March 2016 South by Southwest Film festival.

Pet was released to nine theatres on December 2, 2016 with total gross of $8,004. It was set for a June 16, 2017 theatrical opening in Spain.

== Reception ==
Reviews for Pet have been mixed, with critics alternatively praising the subversive themes and strong leading performances, or lamenting the implausible twists. The review aggregator website Rotten Tomatoes reported that 56% of critics have given the film a positive review based on 18 reviews, with an average rating of 5.16/10. On Metacritic, the film has a weighted average score of 48 out of 100 based on 8 critics, indicating "mixed or average reviews". Reviews that have criticized the twists include Screen Anarchy, which wrote "Without spoiling anything more, the twists push past the merely unlikely into a strange minefield of 'what in the world?'", and RogerEbert.com, which noted "The rank, idiotic implausibilities continue to mount..."

The Hollywood Reporter gave the bottom line of "This graphically violent horror thriller features too many plot twists for its own good", but the review has also words of praise for the direction and cast: "Still, the film is engrossing, thanks to the director’s skill at delivering sustained tension, and the excellent performances."

An entirely positive review came from The A.V. Club's Alex McCown, who stated: "Part of the wicked fun of Pet, a dark little exercise in sadism and black humor, is how it upends the traditional conventions of the 'wronged woman turns the tables on her abuser' narrative. (...) The films zigs where you expect a depraved zag, resulting in a smart and unsettling tale."

Another overall positive review has been given by Katie Walsh of Los Angeles Times, who wrote: "The constant power flipping allows for some interesting explorations of both the misogyny and misandry demonstrated by the main characters, and the way they justify their actions through the philosophical lens of love and sacrifice. 'Pet' is a modern-day fable of unchecked desire that descends quickly into a bloody, morbid cautionary tale."

Francisco Marinero of El Mundo rated Pet 2 out 5 stars, writing that the film, which as usual in American independent pictures stars a "nondescript guy sadly alone in domestic routines", "is conceived as a function of the bombshells in its writing and characters", favouring gruesomeness over suspense.

== See also ==
- List of American films of 2016
- List of Spanish films of 2017
