= Raquel Meroño =

Media Personality

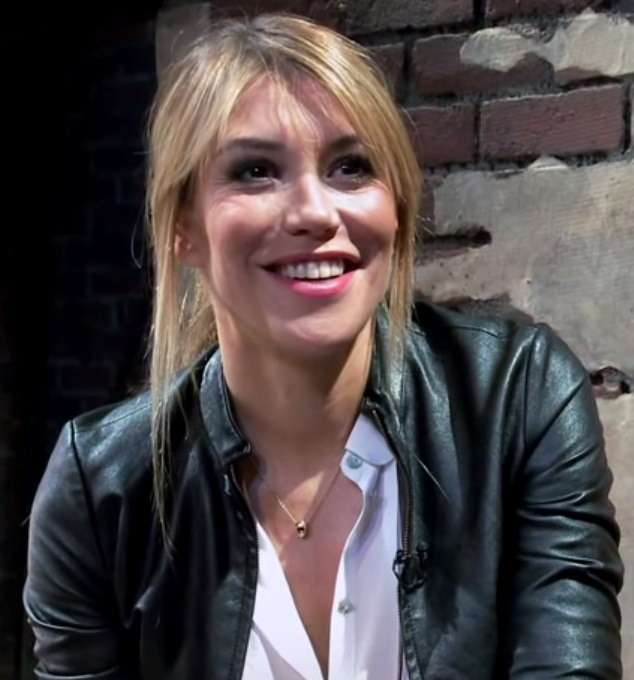
- (2013)
- Born: Raquel Meroño Coello; 8 August 1975 (age 50); Madrid, Spain
- Occupations: Actress, presenter, businesswoman, model

Raquel Meroño Coello (born 8 August 1975) is a Spanish actress, presenter and businesswoman. She enjoyed popularity in Spain as a television personality in the late 1990s to early 2000s.

== Biography ==
Born on 8 August 1975 in Madrid, she early combined her studies of journalism, her first steps in the world of fashion modelling and her activity in television, getting to work as stewardess in Uno para todas, a TV show conducted by Goyo González.

In 1996, Meroño became the presenter of the show Pelotas fuera, broadcast on Antena 3. She was given a supporting role in Juanma Bajo Ulloa's film Airbag (1997), playing 'Araceli', the scorned bride.

For 3 years, she starred in 390 episodes of the popular series Al salir de clase, aired on Telecinco, playing 'Paloma', a role that earned her great popularity in Spain. Cast as 'Bárbara' in Dagon (2001), Meroño co-starred with Ezra Godden in the lovecraftian horror film directed by Stuart Gordon, whose screenplay was a Dennis Paoli's adaptation of the stories Dagon and The Shadow over Innsmouth. She also starred in other horror films, namely The Mark (2003) and Beneath Still Waters (2005).

Meroño appeared in more TV series such as Esencia de poder and Paco y Veva. She also played the role of 'Mónica' in the 2006 series Con dos tacones, aired on TVE1. In 2008, Meroño joined the cast of Yo soy Bea in the role of 'Isabel Rocamora' (the new director of the magazine Bulevar 21), starring in 144 episodes of the TV series. She also appeared in the Arrayán soap opera, aired on the Andalusian regional channel Canal Sur Televisión.

In 2011, the actress decided to enter the business world alongside her partner with the venue scouting company Rockandloft. In 2012, she joined the cast of the Canal Sur series Arrayán during its final season. In 2013, after completing her time on the series, she launched her second business as an event planner.

Stepping away from acting and television—and limiting her appearances to the photocalls of various events—she launched her third business in 2016, the restaurant Carbones 13 in Tarifa, alongside her husband and a friend. In 2018, she made headlines after her restaurant was destroyed by Storm Emma, and barely a month later, she was in the news again when her separation was announced. Meroño won the 5th edition of the competitive reality cooking show MasterChef Celebrity in December 2020.

In June 2021, she began a relationship with Juan Sánchez, with whom she shares a passion for tennis. At the end of August, she returned to acting, joining the main cast of the La 1 series Servir y proteger.

In 2023, she joined the cast of Urban. La vida es nuestra, portraying Dolores, the mother of Lola (María Pedraza).

== Filmography ==
Television

Year	Title	Role	Notes	Ref
1998–2000	Al salir de clase	Paloma	390 episodes	
2001	Esencia de poder			
2003	Paco y Veva			
2006	Con dos tacones	Mónica		
2008–2009	Yo soy Bea	Isabel Rocamora	144 episodes	
2012–2013	Arrayán	Begoña		

Film

Year	Title	Role	Notes	Ref
1997	Airbag	Araceli		
2001	Dagon	Bárbara		
2003	The Mark			
2005	Beneath Still Waters			
