= Natalia Dicenta =

Spanish actress

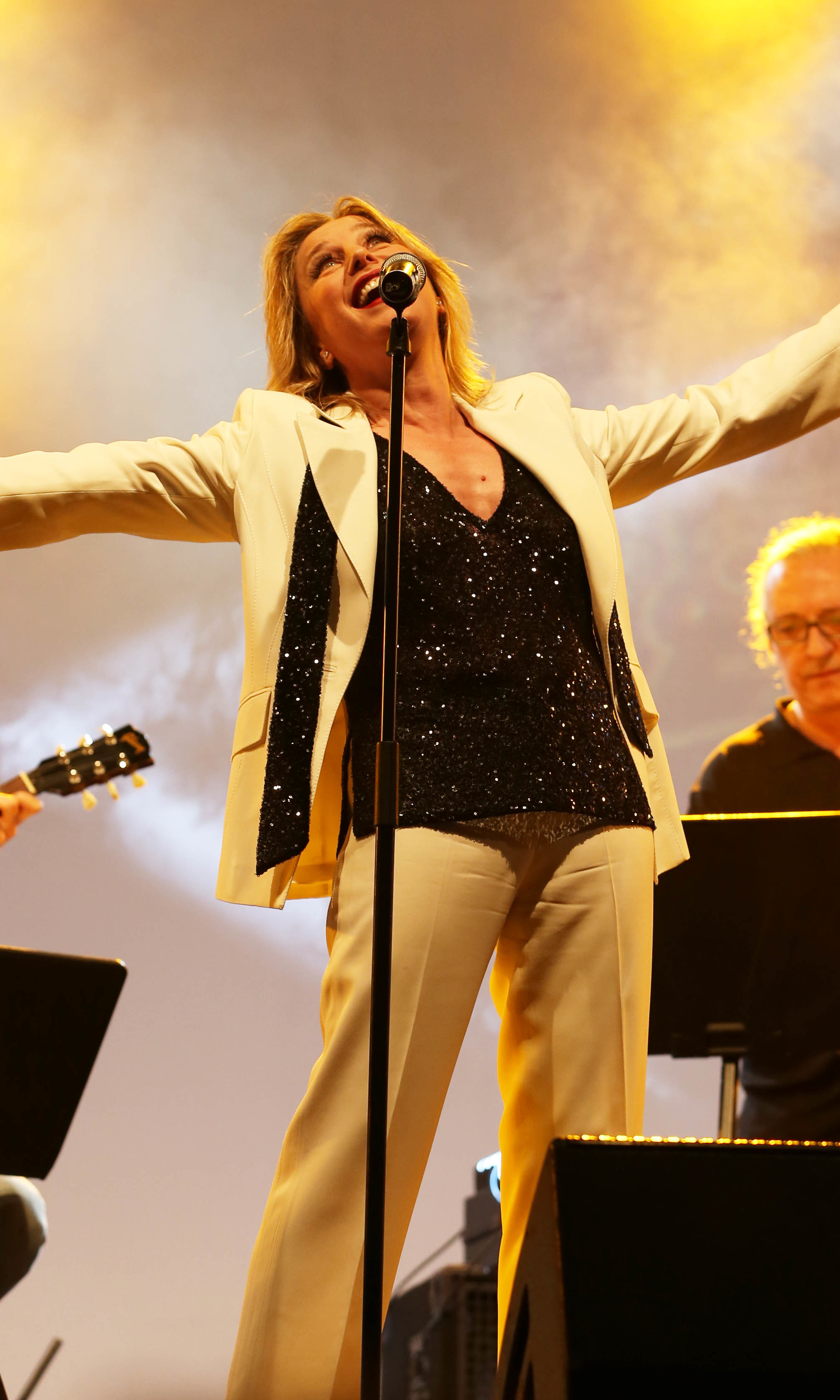
- Born: Natalia Dicenta Herrera; 6 July 1962 (age 63); Madrid, Spain
- Occupation(s): Actress, singer
- Years active: 1973 - present

Natalia Dicenta Herrera (born 6 July 1962) is a Spanish actress and singer.

== Family ==
She was born in Madrid on 6 July 1962. She is the daughter of Spanish actors Lola Herrera and Daniel Dicenta. On her father side, she is the granddaughter of actor Manuel Dicenta, and great-granddaughter of playwright Joaquín Dicenta. Natalia also has a younger brother, named Daniel, a photographer. Her parents married in 1960 and divorced in 1967. She has worked with her mother Lola in many occasions.

== Filmography ==
=== Film ===
- Propiedad privada (2006)
- Mujeres en el parque (2006)
- La monja (2005)
- Cásate conmigo, Maribel (2002)
- ¡Hasta aquí hemos llegado! (2002)
- El florido pensil (2002)
- The Dancer Upstairs (2002)
- Gatos (2002)
- Zapping (1999)
- Entre las piernas (1999) (voice)
- Grandes ocasiones (1998)
- Al límite (1997) (voice)
- En brazos de la mujer madura (1997) (voice)
- Malena es un nombre de tango (1996) (voice)
- Un paraguas para tres (1992)
- Las edades de Lulú (1990) (voice)

=== Television ===
- Entrevias (2022–2023)
- El internado: Las cumbres (2021)
- Fuera de lugar (2008)
- La Mandrágora (2007)
- 7 vidas (2003)
- El comisario (2002)
- Robles, investigador (2000–2001)
- Telepasión española (1999)
- Función de noche (1996)
- La zapatera prodigiosa (1995)
- ¡Ay, Señor, Señor! (1995)
- Primera función (1989)
- Nunca se sabe (1986)
- Media naranja (1986)
- Lecciones de tocador (1983)
- Historias para no dormir (1982)
- El teatro (1974)
- Estudio 1 (1973–1983)

== Discography ==
=== Soundtrack albums ===
- 2002: V premios Max de las artes escénicas (live)

== Awards ==
- Ourense Independent Film Festival
  - 2007: Best Actress in Short Film (for Propiedad privada)
- Fotogramas de Plata
  - 1994: Best Actress (for La zapatera prodigiosa)
- Unión de Actores
  - 1994: Best Actress (for Un tranvía llamdo deseo)
- Premios Max
  - 1997: Best Actress (for A bocados)
