= Snowflake, the White Gorilla =

- Catalan-language Spanish theatrical release poster
- Directed by: Andrés G. Schaer
- Written by: Albert Val; Amèlia Mora
- Produced by: Julio Fernandez
- Starring: David Spade; Ariana Grande; Jennette McCurdy; Nathan Kress; Dallas Lovato; Keith David; Christopher Lloyd
- Cinematography: Sergi Bartrolí
- Music by: Zacarías M. de la Riva
- Production company: Castelao Producciones
- Distributed by: Filmax
- Release date: November 26, 2011
- Running time: 89 minutes
- Country: Spain
- Language: Catalan

Snowflake, the White Gorilla (Catalan: Floquet de Neu, Spanish: Copito de Nieve) is a 2011 Spanish live action/animated adventure film directed by Andrés G. Schaer. The film depicts the fictional childhood of the white gorilla Snowflake.

An English dub with an unknown cast was released. In United States, the film was released on September 1, 2013 with another English dub of the film that stars David Spade, Ariana Grande, Jennette McCurdy, Nathan Kress, Dallas Lovato, Keith David, and Christopher Lloyd. It was produced by Grindstone Entertainment Group and distributed by Lionsgate Home Entertainment. The original Spanish version of the film portrays Snowflake as a male gorilla, while the English dub makes the character a female gorilla.

== Cast ==
=== Spanish cast ===
- Kai Stroink as Snowflake
- Manel Fuentes as Ailur
- Claudia Abate as Wendy
- Constantino Romero as Anvil
- Pere Ponce as Dr. Archibald Pepper
- Elsa Pataky as Bruhmilda the Witch

=== English dub cast ===
- Benjamin Nathan-Serio as Ailur

=== American English dub cast ===
- Ariana Grande as Snowflake
- David Spade as Ailur
- Jennette McCurdy as Petunia
- Nathan Kress as Elvis
- Dallas Lovato as Wendy
  - Eva Bella as Young Wendy
- Keith David as Anvil
- April Winchell as Wendy's Mom
- Christopher Lloyd as Dr. Archibald Pepper
- Diane Michelle as Bruhmilda the Witch
- Vanessa Marshall as Female Newscaster

== Music ==
The original score of Snowflake is composed by Zacarías M. and De la Riva. The American version features two songs, "One In A Million Girl" and "Avalanche" performed by Dallas Lovato and composed by Stephane Deriau-Reine (Stephan DeReine) and Mychal Simka.

== Reception ==
University of Chicago professor Elizabeth Tavella writes in an article on media representations of the original gorilla that the film presents an "overt representation of racialized tropes" including "problematic representations of reverse discrimination". One such trope is the "notion of Blackness arising from dirt", expressed when Snowflake tries to darken his fur with mud to be accepted as a "Black" gorilla by other gorillas at the zoo. Tavella further notes that in the English dubbing, "directorial choices have a drastic impact on gender and racial dynamics", with Snowflake being portrayed as a female gorilla and voiced by a white female actress, and the primary protagonist gorilla being voiced by a Black male, which "reinforces the correlation between sexism and racism".

More succinctly, The Guardian featured the poster for the film in a sardonic gallery about the Cannes Film Festival Marché du Film, stating that there was "something just slightly uncomfortable about this one".

The film received a generally positive review from Cinefilos in Italy, for which the reviewer described it as "an adventure on the road through the streets of a very sunny Barcelona of the 60s mixed with the search for oneself", and found the story to be "linear and simple like the wishes of the little gorilla cub". The review did note that the primary human antagonist of the film was "a too-soft version of Disney's Cruella de Vil". Spanish reviewer Videodromo describes the movie as entertaining for children, though stating that "the overall quality of the product is not exceptional", with the integration of animated characters into a live-action environment falling short of expectations. The review further suggests that children should only see it once, when they are young, because revisiting it at a later age will make them more likely to notice "poorly polished special effects or those laughable dialogues".
