= The Three Best Things in Life =

- Theatrical release poster
- Directed by: Ger Poppelaars
- Written by: Ger Poppelaars
- Produced by: René Scholten
- Starring: Loes Wouterson; Victor Löw; Jack Wouterse
- Cinematography: Lex Wertwijn
- Edited by: Wim Louwrier
- Music by: Henny Vrienten
- Production companies: Studio Nieuwe Gronden; NOS
- Distributed by: Meteor Film Distribution
- Release date: 3 December 1992
- Running time: 103 minutes
- Country: Netherlands
- Language: Dutch

The Three Best Things in Life (Dutch: De Drie Beste Dingen in het Leven) is a 1992 Dutch comedy film directed by Ger Poppelaars. It was entered into the 18th Moscow International Film Festival.

== Cast ==
- Loes Wouterson as Sacha
- Victor Löw as Caspar
- Jack Wouterse as Maarten
- Pierre Bokma as Ben
- Gerard Thoolen as Otto
- Gijs Scholten van Aschat as Thomas
- Michel van Dousselaere as Jawek
- Eric van der Donk as Father
- Adrian Brine as Man in hotel
