= Apartment 143 =

- Directed by: Carles Torrens
- Written by: Rodrigo Cortes
- Produced by: Rodrigo Cortes; Adrian Guerra
- Starring: Kai Lennox; Gia Mantegna; Fiona Glascott; Francesc Garrido; Rick Gonzalez; Michael O'Keefe
- Cinematography: Oscar Duran
- Edited by: Rodrigo Cortes; José Tito
- Music by: Victor Reyes
- Production companies: Nostromo Pictures; Kinology
- Distributed by: Magnet Releasing
- Release date: 4 May 2012 (US)
- Running time: 80 minutes
- Country: Spain
- Language: English

Apartment 143 (original title: Emergo) is a 2012 English-language Spanish horror film written by Rodrigo Cortes and directed by Carles Torrens. It was released on 4 May 2012.

== Premise ==
A parapsychology team is asked to investigate the White family in Apartment 143. Alan White (Kai Lennox) has lost his wife to what was initially said to be an unspecified illness, but later clarified as an automobile accident during a psychotic episode. The family started to experience strange events shortly after the death, and relocated from their prior home to the apartment to escape them. The move was initially successful, but after about a week strange incidents resumed in the new location.

The team consists of Dr. Helzer (Michael O'Keefe), Paul Ortega (Rick Gonzalez), and the technician, Ellen Keegan (Fiona Glascott). After they set up their equipment, they get some compelling evidence on camera.

== Cast ==
- Kai Lennox ... Alan White
- Gia Mantegna ... Caitlin White
- Fiona Glascott ... Ellen Keegan
- Francesc Garrido ... Heseltine
- Rick Gonzalez ... Paul Ortega
- Michael O'Keefe ... Dr. Helzer
- Damian Roman ... Benny White
- Laura Martuscelli ... Cynthia
- Fermi Reixach ... Lamson

== Reception ==
Apartment 143 currently has a 17% on Rotten Tomatoes based on 6 reviews, with an average rating of 2.9/10.
