= Worst Case Scenario (cancelled film) =

Cancelled film

- Theatrical poster
- Directed by: Richard Raaphorst
- Written by: Miguel Tejeda Flores; Bart Oosterhoorn
- Produced by: Bart Oosterhoorn; Fir Suidema; Lars Björck; Jack F. Murphy
- Starring: Jaap van Otterlo; Joost Ivangh
- Narrated by: Brian Yuzna
- Edited by: Jan Doense
- Music by: Bong-Ra; J.G. Thirlwell
- Distributed by: Gorehound Canned Film
- Country: Netherlands
- Language: Dutch
- Budget: €6,000

Worst Case Scenario is a cancelled comedy horror film that was to be directed in 2009 by Dutch director Richard Raaphorst. It was never completed.

== Plot ==
The story tells of a fictional 2006 FIFA World Cup Finale between Germany and Netherlands. When the team from Germany loses, it is followed by an invasion of Nazi zombies. A small group of friends moves away from the nationwide madness, to a North Sea island where a horde of Nazi zombies wait.

== Production ==
The film began shooting in 2004, two years later in 2006 Gorehound Inc. released a teaser and a trailer. The film's trailer was released in a limited promo version on DVD and was nominated for the Golden Trailer Awards 2005 in the category "Best Movie Trailer". After many financial problems the film was canceled in March 2009, and Richard Raaphorst began working on Frankenstein's Army (2013).

== Print adaptation ==
After a successful crowdfunding campaign in 2020, Worst Case Scenario was released as a graphic novel in 2023.

== See also ==
- List of zombie short films and undead-related projects
