= Zapping (film) =

- Film poster
- Directed by: Juan Manuel Chumilla Carbajosa
- Written by: Juan Manuel Chumilla Carbajosa
- Produced by: Francisco Ramos
- Starring: Alberto San Juan; Natalia Dicenta; Paz Vega; Eduard Fernández
- Cinematography: Teo Delgado
- Edited by: Ángel Hernández Zoido
- Music by: Miguel Franco; Alejandro Ibáñez
- Production company: Aurum Producciones
- Distributed by: Aurum
- Release dates: June 1999 (Málaga); 6 August 1999 (Spain)
- Country: Spain
- Language: Spanish

Zapping is a 1999 Spanish satirical thriller film written and directed by Juan Manuel Chumilla Carbajosa which stars Alberto San Juan, Natalia Dicenta, Paz Vega, and Eduard Fernández.

== Plot ==
Scorned middle-class housewife Ana María tries to win back her husband Alberto (a sci-fi fan dating younger nurse Elvira, in turn chased by jealous and psychopatic ex-boyfriend Ramiro) via a television show.

== Cast ==
- Alberto San Juan as Alberto
- Natalia Dicenta as Ana María
- Paz Vega as Elvira
- Eduard Fernández as Ramiro / Ramón
- Guillermo Toledo

== Production ==
The film is an Aurum Producciones production. It boasted a budget of 160 million ₧.

== Release ==
The film premiered at the 2nd Málaga Film Festival in June 1999. Distributed by Aurum, it was released theatrically in Spain on 6 August 1999.

== Reception ==
Jonathan Holland of Variety deemed the film to be a "a surreal, formally confused but visually daring take on the power of the televised image".

== See also ==
- List of Spanish films of 1999
