= Alexander Mercury =

British actor

Alexander Terentyev
- Born: Alexander Terentyev; 5 September 1983 (age 42); Krasnoyarsk, RSFSR, USSR (now Russia)
- Occupations: Actor, director
- Years active: 2000–present

Alexander Terentyev (born 5 September 1983) is a bilingual British actor and film director of Russian origin.

== Early life ==
Alexander attended primary school in Krasnoyarsk (Siberia), secondary school (a French lycée) - in Moscow and received higher education in London. He trained as an actor at the London Academy of Music and Dramatic Art (2003–2006) together with Luke Treadaway, Harry Treadaway, Emily Beecham and Harry Haddon-Paton.

== Career ==
Upon graduation, Alexander was cast as a Tartar Officer in a family fantasy film The Golden Compass (2007). In Frankenstein's Army (2013) he portrayed Dimitri. Most recent projects are the TV-series Londongrad (2015) for the Russian entertainment channel STS in which he plays Marcus Stapleton, a British diplomat, and Okkupert (2015), a Norwegian political thriller TV-series based on an idea by Jo Nesbø, which was filmed on location in Norway.

In 2014, together with a London-based writer Juja Dobrachkous, Alexander adapted an original story called 'Mama" into a short film script 'Mama – Saint Sebastian'. The film was shot on location over 10 days in St. Petersburg and Moscow in early 2015. Post-production was completed in March 2016. The picture was awarded Best Script Prize at St. Anne's Film Festival, Master of Emotions (Golden Anteater) at Lublin Film Festival, Special Jury Prize at VKRATZE Film Festival and screened at over 25 film festivals around the world including the prestigious London Short Film Festival.

== Selected filmography ==
=== Film ===
- The Golden Compass (2007) - Tartar Officer
- Material Drive (2012) - Gustav
- Frankenstein's Army (2013) - Dimitri / Wall Zombot #4 - Legs
- Jack Ryan: Shadow Recruit (2014) - Waiter
- Sex, Coffee and Cigarettes (2014) - Photographer
- Wonder Woman (2017) - German Lieutenant
- The Hitman's Bodyguard (2017) - Hacker Merc

=== Television ===
- Londongrad (2015) - Marcus Stapleton
- McMafia (2018) - Russian Functionary

=== Video games ===
- Battlefield 4 (2013) – Russian soldier (voice, singleplayer)
- Insurgency: Sandstorm (2018) - Mercenary (voice)
- Subnautica: Below Zero (2019) - Serik Jevov (voice, cut character)
