= Beneath Still Waters =

- Theatrical poster
- Spanish: Bajo aguas tranquilas
- Directed by: Brian Yuzna
- Screenplay by: Mike Hostench; Angel Sala
- Based on: Beneath Still Waters by Matthew Costello
- Produced by: Julio Fernández; Brian Yuzna
- Starring: Michael McKell; Raquel Meroño; Charlotte Salt
- Cinematography: Johnny Yebra
- Edited by: Nicolas Chaudeurge
- Music by: Zacarías M. de la Riva
- Production company: Fantastic Factory
- Distributed by: Filmax (International); Lionsgate (United States)
- Release date: 23 October 2005
- Running time: 96 minutes
- Countries: Spain; UK
- Languages: Spanish; English
- Budget: $5 million

Beneath Still Waters (Spanish: Bajo aguas tranquilas) is a 2005 horror film directed by Brian Yuzna. It stars Michael McKell, Raquel Meroño and Charlotte Salt. It is based on a novel by Matthew Costello.

== Plot ==
Studying under a disciple of Aleister Crowley, the leader of an upper class group invokes a supernatural force that slowly devours the village of Marienbad and its inhabitants, threatening to spread beyond its geographical limits. The mayor from the town nearby commissions the building of a dam which would flood the valley in 1965 and therefore submerge the village forever sealing the evil force under water after the leader and his followers were incapacitated to be kept from escaping. However, fate ensured the leader's freedom as he remained in the depths when the waters covered Marienbad. Now in 2005, 40 years later an array of disappearances and deaths in mysterious circumstances are threatening the town next to the reservoir that now covers Marienbad.

== Cast ==
- Michael McKell as Dan Quarry
- Raquel Meroño as Teresa Borgia
- Charlotte Salt as Clara Borgia
- Patrick Gordon as Mordecai Salas
- Manuel Manquiña as Luis
  - Omar Muñoz as 10-year-old Luis
- Pilar Soto as Susana
- Diana Peñalver as Mrs. Martín
- Ricard Borràs as Mayor Luca
- Damià Plensa as Antonio
- David Meca as Diver Sargent Eduardo
- Carlos Castañón as Police Captain Keller
- Eve Karpf as Sophie
- Josep Maria Pou as Julio Gambine

Additionally, Axelle Carolyn appears as a partygoer, and Javier Botet, in his film debut, portrays a humanoid creature.

== Production ==
Beneath Still Waters was produced in Catalonia. The film is the ninth and last film to be produced by Filmax's Fantastic Factory label. It is based on the novel Beneath Still Waters by Matthew J. Costello.

== Release ==
Beneath Still Waters premiered on 23 October 2005 as part of the San Sebastián Horror and Fantasy Film Festival, followed by general theatrical release in Spain on 26 May 2006. It was released on DVD in the US on 9 April 2007.

== Reception ==
Steve Barton of Dread Central gave Beneath Still Waters one star out of five and called it a "poorly assembled, laughably bad, absolute waste of time". Annie Riordan of Brutal as Hell also rated it one star out of five and wrote that the film does not live up to the potentially interesting premise. David Johnson of DVD Verdict opined that while the film does contain some good scenes, it also contains tedious character development, unlikeable characters, and overreliance on poor CGI. At DVD Talk, Scott Weinberg rated it two stars out of five and Paul Mavis one and a half out of five, with both calling it derivative of earlier horror films. Writing in The Zombie Movie Encyclopedia, Volume 2, academic Peter Dendle said, "The human dimensions of the story don't connect well, but the underwater scenes are visually very appealing."
