= The Nun (2005 film) =

- Directed by: Luis De La Madrid
- Written by: Luis De La Madrid
- Produced by: Brian Yuzna
- Starring: Anita Briem; Manu Fullola; Cristina Piaget; Alistair Freeland; Teté Delgado; Oriana Bonet; Belén Blanco; Alexia Iborra; Paulina Gálvez; Natalia Dicenta; Lola Marceli
- Music by: Luc Suarez
- Production company: Fantastic Factory
- Distributed by: Filmax International; Lionsgate (United States)
- Release date: 12 May 2005 (Cannes Film Festival)
- Running time: 101 minutes
- Country: Spain
- Language: English / Spanish
- Budget: $5 million

The Nun (Spanish: La Monja) is an English-language 2005 Spanish horror film directed by Luis De La Madrid.

== Plot ==
An insane nun named Sister Ursula terrorizes her students at a Catholic boarding school. One of the girls named Mary is discovered to have been impregnated by an important official at the school. Eventually, the malicious and aggressive Ursula discovers her secret and tries to force an abortion on her with a bathroom appliance. Mary's friends hear her screaming and attack the nun, forcing her to release Mary and causing her to bump her head and fall into a bathtub filled with water.

The girls leave Sister Ursula in a pond blessed by priests. They swear an oath of secrecy, and the Spanish Authorities of Barcelona simply report the Sister missing. Eighteen years later, the pond is drained. The vengeful soul of the nun is freed from her watery prison, and leaves to wreak havoc on the girls who were her mortal downfall.

A young girl, Eve, goes to the boarding school, after her mother, Mary, is murdered, to find out what is going on. There, she meets the other survivors, and together with her friends, they defend themselves from Ursula's spirit whilst desperately trying to figure out how to banish the nun once and for all.

Eve had arrived home to see an apparition slitting her mother's throat. She joins with an old friend of her mother's for an investigation. After Joanna's death in London, Christy, along with all the other girls involved in the Ursula incident, suspect that it has something to do with the murder they had committed years earlier. Christy plans to tell Eve everything, but is killed in an elevator before she can.

Eve finds an old love letter addressed to her mother by someone named Miguel. She decides to see the other members of her mother's circle and warn them before it is too late. She goes to a Special Theological Institute to find the archives of the old boarding school, which had been shut down. She decides to go to Barcelona and try to find out what had happened.

She meets Gabriel, a young Spanish man who is studying to be a priest. She employs him to translate all of the archival documents for her. He returns with the address of one of the survivors, Eulalia. But it is too late; Eulalia is murdered by the Nun, crucified in her bathroom. Eve has seen the killer to be Ursula but Mary's friends, Susan and Zoe explain that this is impossible because they had taken her life years before.

Eve finds a Bible in Ursula's old room, dedicated to Ursula by a priest named Father Miguel. In a romantic moment, she and the young priest kiss. The spirit of the dead nun appears and passes right through Eve and she receives a vision of her mother in the past, speaking on the phone to a man named Miguel. The priest reveals his discovery: each of the women who are now dying share their names with Catholic saints. As these saints died, so are the women dying; a sick re-enactment of the Martyrdom.

Susan starts to blame Eve for the trouble they are in, as she is "the sin" that Sister Ursula was trying to purge in the first place. The Nun then kills her by decapitation. Zoe tells Eve that Eve's father was Father Miguel. Gabriel supposes that the Nun could only die in the water and that she can only be killed as her own namesake, St. Ursula, had died: by an arrow through the heart. They make an arrow and place it in a gun to fire it into the Nun's heart. They do not manage to lay Ursula to rest in time to save Zoe, who is burned to death in an oven. Gabriel is also killed, hurled into a wall by a bursting water main.

Eve enters the flooded room and waits underwater with the gun in hand. Joel tells Julia that his theory is that he believes that Eve must have always known subconsciously. He supposes that her mother and mother's friends had murdered the nun, who possessed Eve, using her body to exact her revenge. Julia swims down to where the water is deep and sees Eve killed by her own spear.

== Cast ==
- Anita Briem as Eve
- Alexia Iborra as Young Eve
- Belén Blanco as Julia
- Manu Fullola as Gabriel
- Alistair Freeland as Joel
- Paulina Gálvez as Zoe
- Natalia Dicenta as Susan
- Oriana Bonet as Eulalia
- Teté Delgado as Christy
- Lola Marceli as Mary
- Cristina Piaget as Sister Ursula "The Nun"
- Montse Pla as Joana
- Alessandra Streignard as Bibí
- Ludovic Tattevin as Botones

== Production ==
The film marked the directorial debut of film editor Luis De La Madrid who worked on a number Filmax and Fantastic Factory films.

== Release ==
The Nun was given a straight-to-video release on April 25, 2006.
