= Carles Torrens =

American actor

- Born: 1984 (age 41–42); Barcelona, Catalonia, Spain
- Other name: Carlos Torrens
- Education: Chapman University
- Occupations: Film director; Screenwriter; Film producer; Film editor
- Years active: 2003–present
- Notable work: Sequence (2013)
- Parent: Salvador Torrens (father)

Carles Torrens (born 1984) is a Spanish film and television director, screenwriter, editor, and producer, known for his award-winning short films and his 2011 feature film debut Apartment 143 (Emergo).

== Early life ==
Torrens was born in Barcelona, Spain in 1984, and lived there until he turned 18. He moved to the United States to pursue film and graduated from Chapman University where he completed the short films Coming to Town in 2006 and Delaney in 2008. After graduating, he directed Apartment 143 marking it as his 2011 feature film debut.

== Filmography ==
His film project Pet, starring Dominic Monaghan, Ksenia Solo, Jennette McCurdy, and Nathan Parsons debuted at the South by Southwest Film festival during March 2016. Writer Brant Hughes brought a film pitch forVisceral to Solipsist Films and, based upon the success of Apartment 143 and Sequence, Torrens was brought aboard the project as director.

=== Television ===
- Días de cine (2 episodes, 2011–2013) as Himself
- Sala 33 (1 episode 2013) as Himself
- VI Premis Gaudí de l'Acadèmia del Cinema Català (2014) as Himself

=== Film ===
- Beyond Re-Animator (2003) (assistant screenwriter)
- Frank's First Love (2005) (editor)
- Coming to Town (2006) (writer, director, editor)
- Plou a Barcelona (2008) (director)
- Greg and Emilia (2008) as Groomsman
- Delaney (2008) (writer, director)
- In Utero (2010) (writer)
- Noel Schajris: Momentos (2010) (writer, director)
- Cuatro Estaciones (2010) as Bailarín Agresivo
- Apartment 143 (2011) (director)
- M Is for Mom (2013) (director) (submitted for ABCs of Death 2, later published as part of ABC's of Death 2½)
- Sequence (2013) (writer, director)
- Les Nenes no Haurien de Jugar al Futbol (2014) (producer)
- Hide and Seek (2014) (director)
- Pet (2016) (director, producer).
- Visceral (2016) (director)
- Apocalypse Z: The Beginning of the End (2024)

== Recognition ==
In 2012, Film de Culte referred to Torrens "a promising director".

=== Partial awards ===
- 2007, won Audience Award for 'Best Short Film' at Sci-Fi-London for Coming to Town
- 2009, Won 'Best Dark Comedy' Jury Award for at Hollywood International Student Film Festival for Delaney
- 2010, Won 'Premi Serra Circular' at Cryptshow Festival de Badalona for Delaney
- 2010, Won Festival Prize for Best Horror/Thriller at Route 66 Film Festival for Delaney
- 2013, Won 'Best of the Fest Award' at LA Shorts Fest for Sequence
- 2013, Won 'Best Direction' Grand Jury Prize at 24FPS International Short Film Festival for Sequence
- 2014, Won 'International Competition' Canal+ Award at Clermont-Ferrand International Short Film Festival for Sequence
- 2014, Won Faro de Plata at Festival de Cine de L'Alfàs del Pi for Sequence
