= Victor Löw =

Dutch actor (born 1962)

- Born: Victor Löwenstein; 25 August 1962 (age 63); Amsterdam, the Netherlands

Victor Löw (born 25 August 1962 in Amsterdam; originally Victor Löwenstein), is a Dutch actor.

Victor Löw studied at Studio Herman Teirlinck in Antwerp. He played his first small part in The Northerners. After that he played in numerous films, which include three Oscar-nominated films (2 wins) Antonia's Line (1995), Character (1997) and Everybody's Famous! (2000).

== Filmography ==
- The Northerners (De Noorderlingen, 1992)
- The Three Best Things in Life (De Drie Beste Dingen in het Leven, 1992)
- Antonia's Line (1995)
- Character (1997)
- The Flying Liftboy (1998)
- No Trains No Planes (1999)
- Do Not Disturb (1999)
- Everybody's Famous! (2000)
- Leak (Lek, 2000)
- Costa! (2001)
- The Enclave (2002) (TV film)
- SuperTex (2003)
- Stille Nacht (2004)
- Floris (2004)
- For a few marbles more (2006) (voice)
- Reykjavík-Rotterdam (2008)
- Popo (2008)
- Daylight (2013)
- Michiel de Ruyter (2015)
- Prey (2016)

== Awards and nominations ==
- Nomination for a Golden Calf for Best Actor for his role in Meedingers (1998)
- Golden Calf for Best Actor for his role in Lek (2000)
