= Susanne Wright =

- Born: Susanne Friedländer; Vienna, Austria
- Occupation: Memoirist
- Genre: Non-fiction, memoir

Susanne Wright is an Austrian-born memoirist.

== Biography ==
Susanne Friedländer was born in Vienna, Austria as the daughter of a Jewish father and a Catholic mother.

With the Anschluss of Austria and Nazi Germany in March 1938, her family were destructed and her father was transported to an unknown destination.

Years later she wrote the book A Ballad by Johannes Brahms. A journey to understand a childhood in Vienna shattered by Nazism that explores Susanne's journey as she traces her Jewish ancestry through the changing times of Imperial Vienna in an effort to make sense of the influences of the Enlightenment, anti-Semitism, assimilation, intermarriage, and the collapse of the Austro-Hungarian Monarchy.

== Published works ==
- A Ballad by Johannes Brahms (Makor, 2006)
