= Diana Lado =

Spanish-American actress in Hollywood

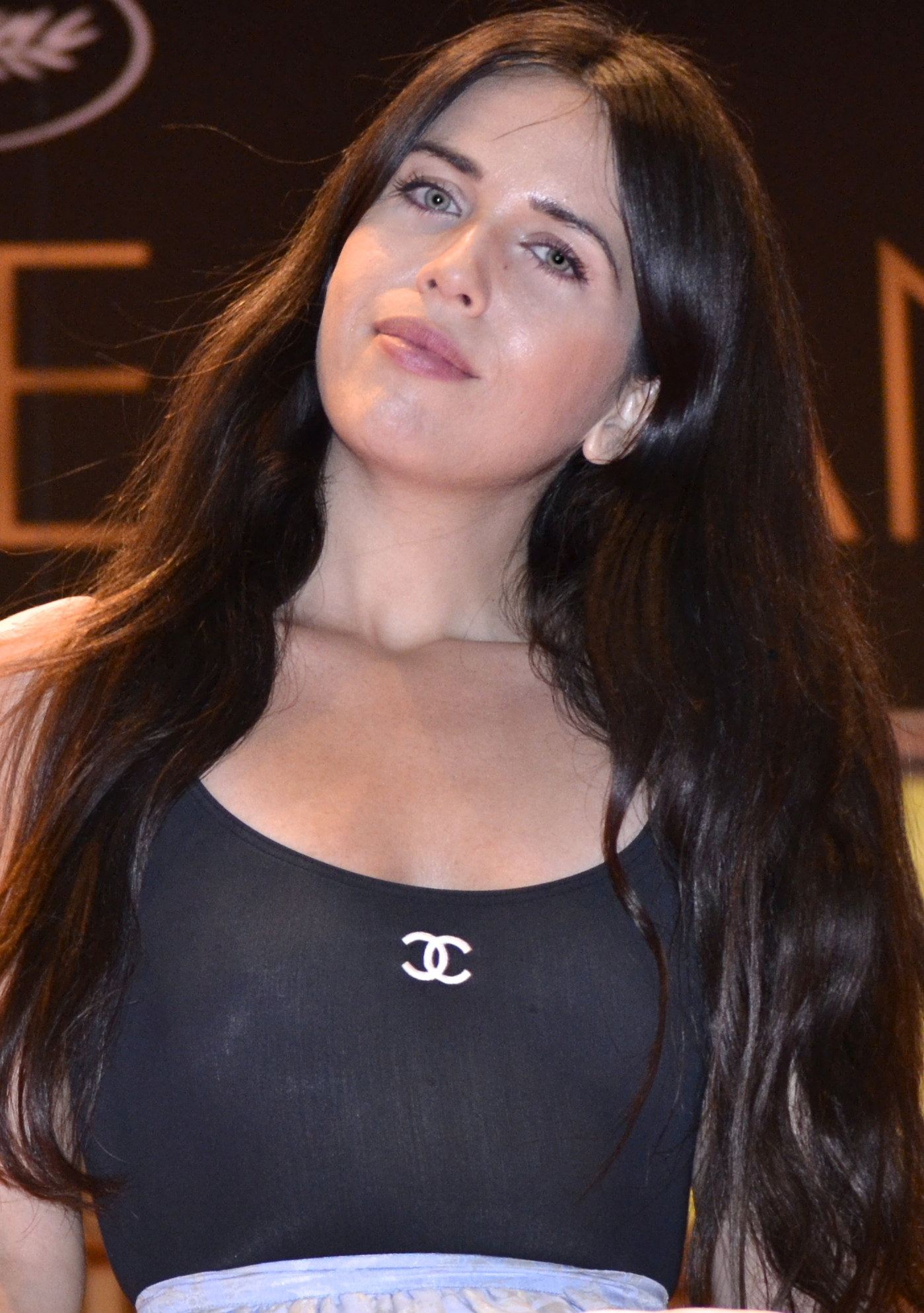
- Lado photographed at the red carpet of Festival de Cannes
- Born: Barcelona, Spain
- Education: University of London
- Occupation: Actress
- Years active: 2012–present
- Partner: Logan Yuzna
- Website: Official Website

Diana Lado is a Spanish-American actress in Hollywood. Born in Barcelona, Lado studied in London until she moved to Los Angeles, California, where she currently resides.

== Career ==
Diana Lado is an independent film actress that has appeared in award winning films including the Academy Award winner Spike Jonze's 2018 Chocolate Film Festival official selection film "It's a Skater", where she played the lead role of Angela Jacob. She is also known in the United States for her role of Mercedes in the North American prime time TV series "Una Palabra". Lado's stage debut was in the 2017 award winning Hollywood theater production about the life of Frida Kahlo where she played the principal role of Frida's lover, Cuban spy Teresa Proenza, as well as Italian artist Tina Modotti. Lado frequently performs her stand-up comedy routines throughout Los Angeles.

Lado started her career in Barcelona, Spain, writing and performing theater before moving to London, in the United Kingdom, where she studied at the London Conservatoire for Dance and Drama, as well as studying Semiotics at the University of London. She relocated to Los Angeles and completed a Meisner technique two-year conservatory program with William Esper disciple Joshua Bitton. After auditioning for admission at the prestigious The Groundlings school, Lado was accepted and joined their competitive program for improvisational and sketch comedy.

The actress went behind the lens to direct a digital campaign in Central Park, New York, for Reebok as well as in her hometown, Barcelona, for Thrasher Skateboarding magazine with reporter Raisinman. Lado has done voice overs for The Walt Disney Company and Sony Animation, promoting the Academy Award winning films Frozen and Zootopia, the Tinkerbell DVD series, and Hotel Transylvania 2. She curated a film retrospective that showed at the Soho House in Hollywood during The Golden Globe Awards week.

Lado has appeared as TV host for Spanish channels including the Spanish National Television "TVE1", covering the Barcelona and New York Fashion Weeks among other events. She has worked commercially with brands, as Brand Ambassador and Influencer, having been featured in international publications, including Vogue.

Vogue magazine named Lado one of the "Top 10 most influential professional women in Los Angeles".

== Media image ==
Lado's public life garnered the interest of magazines and other publications, mostly related to the fashion and lifestyle industries. Lado hosted an event in New York City for Carolina Herrera that was named "the most exclusive party in New York" by Glamour magazine. She attracted the attention of the Los Angeles writer Ali Trachta, who wrote a profile article about her for the tabloid LA Weekly, in which she named Lado the "Coolest girl in the room" after meeting Lado at the Chateau Marmont in Hollywood. She is called "marvelous" by the Spanish network Tendencias TV who compares Lado's life to The CW series Gossip Girl. Lado's personal appearances are captured by the industry's most renowned photographers such as Patrick McMullan, Emanuele D'Angelo "LIVINCOOL" for Interview Magazine, Mark Hunter "The Cobrasnake" at Jeremy Scott's front row, and Kevin Tachman. Hamptons magazine featured the actress at the front row in Milk Studios during New York Fashion Week. Lado is featured in international publications, such as Vogue, Glamour, Marie Claire, and Grazia. Lado is one of the Influencers followed by MTV during their Coachella Music Festival docu-series in 2016.

An identified philanthropist, Lado made personal appearances at the powerful amfAR fundraising galas in Cannes, New York City, and Los Angeles. She has been personally involved with children causes such as the Harapan project in Sumbawa, Indonesia, as well as Reading Partners, a charity that helps raise the literacy among children in Los Angeles.

== Style ==
Lado's fashion style has been documented on magazines and best-dressed lists. Often associated with the fashion industry, she is a regular at the front rows of the prominent London Fashion Week and New York Fashion Week shows. She is credited as a fashion stylist in the 2015 Christmas issue of the popular Hello! magazine in Spain, Revista ¡HOLA!. The popular fashion site Jezebel wrote that "Diana Lado looks like a witch getting ready for bed, in a good way" after Lado appeared in a goth inspired look for the red carpet of the amfAR gala in Cipriani, Wall Street, in New York City. Lado has been Brand Ambassador for Spanish clothing brands Mango, Carolina Herrera, and Rosa Clará, among others, and has worked with the British Topshop on many collaborations, including the "Top 10 Influential Women of LA" during Oscars week in Hollywood.

== Personal life ==
Lado lives in Los Angeles. She is in a relationship with the American artist Logan Yuzna. Both were photographed on the red carpet of The Golden Globe Awards as well as at the Avengers 2 world premiere, and later confirmed to MTV being romantically involved. Since her personal relationship with Yuzna, Lado has been associated with skateboarding culture and has appeared in the animated series "King Raisin" as a regular character named Zoe.
