= Logan Yuzna =

Filmmaker (born 1980s)

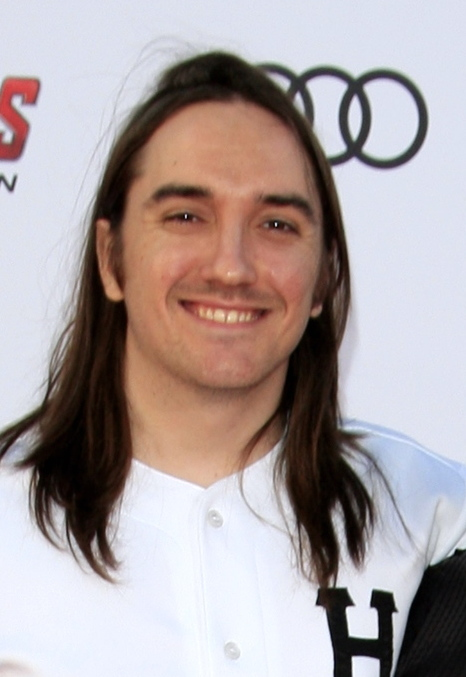
- Yuzna in October 2016
- Born: 1987 or 1988 (age 37–38)
- Other names: Raisinman
- Occupation(s): Film producer and director
- Father: Brian Yuzna

Logan Yuzna (born 1987 or 1988) is a film producer and director.

Born in 1987 or 1988, Logan Yuzna is the son of Brian Yuzna. In spring 2009, Yuzna was accepted as a transfer student at the University of California, Los Angeles (UCLA) from Santa Monica College where he was "a European Studies major".

Also known as "Raisinman", Yuzna is a film producer and director. In 2022, Yuzna was attached to direct the heist film Stealing McCloud.
