= Frankenstein's Army =

2013 film by Richard Raaphorst

- North American DVD cover
- Directed by: Richard Raaphorst
- Screenplay by: Chris W. Mitchell; Miguel Tejada-Flores
- Story by: Richard Raaphorst; Miguel Tejada-Flores
- Produced by: Nick Jongerius; Daniel Koefoed; Todd Brown; Greg Newman
- Starring: Karel Roden; Joshua Sasse; Luke Newberry; Alexander Mercury; Robert Gwilym; Andrei Zayats; Mark Stevenson; Hon Ping Tang
- Cinematography: Bart Beekman
- Edited by: Jasper Verhorevoort; Aaron Crozier
- Music by: Reyn Ouwehand
- Production companies: Dark Sky Films; Pellicola; XYZ Films
- Distributed by: MPI Media Group
- Release dates: January 26, 2013 (IFFR); July 26, 2013 (United States)
- Running time: 84 minutes
- Countries: United States; Czech Republic; Netherlands
- Language: English

Frankenstein's Army is a 2013 horror film directed by Richard Raaphorst, written by Chris W. Mitchell and Miguel Tejada-Flores, and starring Karel Roden, Joshua Sasse, Luke Newberry, Alexander Mercury, Robert Gwilym, Andrei Zayats, Mark Stevenson and Hon Ping Tang. An international co-production of the United States, the Czech Republic, and the Netherlands, the found footage film is set on the Eastern Front of World War II and follows a Red Army reconnaissance team. During their mission, they encounter undead mechanical soldiers created by a mad scientist descended from Victor Frankenstein.

Before the production of Frankenstein's Army, Raaphorst worked on a project titled Worst Case Scenario, which began production in 2004. After several years in development, the project was cancelled in 2009 due to financial problems. A planned prequel, titled Army of Frankenstein, was later reworked into Frankenstein's Army.

The film premiered at the International Film Festival Rotterdam on January 26, 2013, before receiving a limited theatrical release in the United States on July 26, 2013. It was later released on home video by MPI Media Group and Dark Sky Films. The film received mixed reviews from critics, developed a cult following for its atmosphere and creature design, and received a Special Mention for the Grand Prize of European Fantastic Film (Silver) at the 2013 Sitges Film Festival.

== Plot ==
During the closing days of World War II, a Soviet reconnaissance team consisting of Novikov, Sergei, Vassili, Alexei, Ivan, Sacha, and Dmitri are on a mission to destroy a German sniper nest. After completing the objective, the squad receives a Soviet distress call that repeats without any response to their queries; at the same time, they lose radio contact with high command. Although the soldiers are skeptical of the presence of Soviet forces in the area, team leader Novikov orders them to investigate, and they encounter dead Nazis, a burned convent, and strange machinery along the way. When the soldiers arrive at their destination, they find an abandoned church where they accidentally activate a "zombot"—a reanimated corpse with mechanical implants fused onto its body. The zombot kills Novikov before being killed by the rest of the men and Sergei takes charge as the new team leader.

The soldiers see an elderly caretaker enter the church and ambush him. He is interrogated by Dmitri, who asks for the location of the stranded Soviet soldiers they heard on the radio. The caretaker insists that the village is abandoned, with everyone killed or scared off by the creatures created by "The Doctor", but Vassili becomes impatient and cuts off his finger. Coerced by the torture, the caretaker agrees to lead them to the source of the Soviet distress call, but instead leads them into a maze of corridors, leading to a zombot trap where Ivan is mortally wounded. The squad manages to escape, and back at the church they encounter a group of German survivors—elderly Fritz, young boy Hans, and nurse Eva—that had been hiding from the zombots. Vassili suggests killing them, but Eva convinces the Russians to spare her and her fellow survivors by offering to help the wounded Ivan. When she is unable to save him and he dies of his injuries, Vassili knocks her unconscious. Suddenly, Alexei is ambushed and killed by a zombot as multiple of them enter the church and close in on the group.

The survivors manage to escape into the church's catacombs, where Sergei discovers that Dmitri has been deceiving the squad by using a radio jammer to both block contact with high command and transmit the fake distress call they received. Dmitri reveals that he has a secret mission from the Soviet government to capture or kill the Nazi scientist who created the zombots, and to document their mission in case they cannot capture him. Furious that they were deceived and led unprepared into this mission, Sergei and Vassili threaten to kill Dmitri, but he asserts his authority by revealing that he is a Captain in the Red Army, outranking both of them, and threatens their families with retribution if they disobey his orders. As Dmitri leads the group deeper into the catacombs, they encounter more zombots before reaching a chute leading into the factory. Sergei and Vassili force Hans to go down the chute to investigate and the boy is immediately killed by a zombot which then climbs up the chute and attacks the group; though they manage to destroy it, Fritz is killed in the struggle. Sergei, Vassili, and Sacha then stage a mutiny against Dmitri and throw him and his film equipment down the chute.

Unable to climb back up, Dmitri ventures deeper into the facility, where zombots capture him. The caretaker reveals himself to be Dr. Viktor Frankenstein, a descendant of Victor Frankenstein and creator of the zombots. He explains that he developed the creatures from his grandfather's research after breaking away from his Nazi superiors. Dmitri finds Hans transformed into a zombot and Sergei and Vassili held captive. As Soviet artillery approaches, Dmitri offers Frankenstein protection from the Soviet government, but Frankenstein instead demonstrates an experiment by transplanting half of a captured Nazi soldier's brain into Sergei with Eva's assistance. Frankenstein prepares to operate on Dmitri, but the bombardment forces him to flee. Sacha emerges and fatally shoots Frankenstein before taking his severed head and Dmitri's camera as proof of the mission. Sacha escapes as the revived Sergei kills Dmitri.

The "document" then ends with a photo of a newly promoted Sacha standing next to Stalin.

== Cast ==
- Karel Roden as Dr. Viktor Frankenstein
- Alexander Mercury as Dmitri
- Joshua Sasse as Sergei
- Andrei Zayats as Vassili
- Hon Ping Tang as Ivan, "Ivan Zombot"
- Mark Stevenson as Alexei
- Luke Newberry as Sacha
- Robert Gwilym as Novikov
- Cristina Catalina as Eva, "Nurse Zombot"
- Zdenek Barinka as Hans, "Pod Zombot"
- Jan de Lukowicz as Fritz
- Klaus Lucas as Dieter, The Dying Nazi Officer

== Production ==
=== Origins and development ===
Stories of Frankenstein's monster disturbed director Richard Raaphorst as a child. When he was thinking of ideas for a monster film, he went back to the Frankenstein mythology, which he extended to World War II. Raaphorst said he was drawn to the idea of an army of Frankensteins in World War II it was "insane".

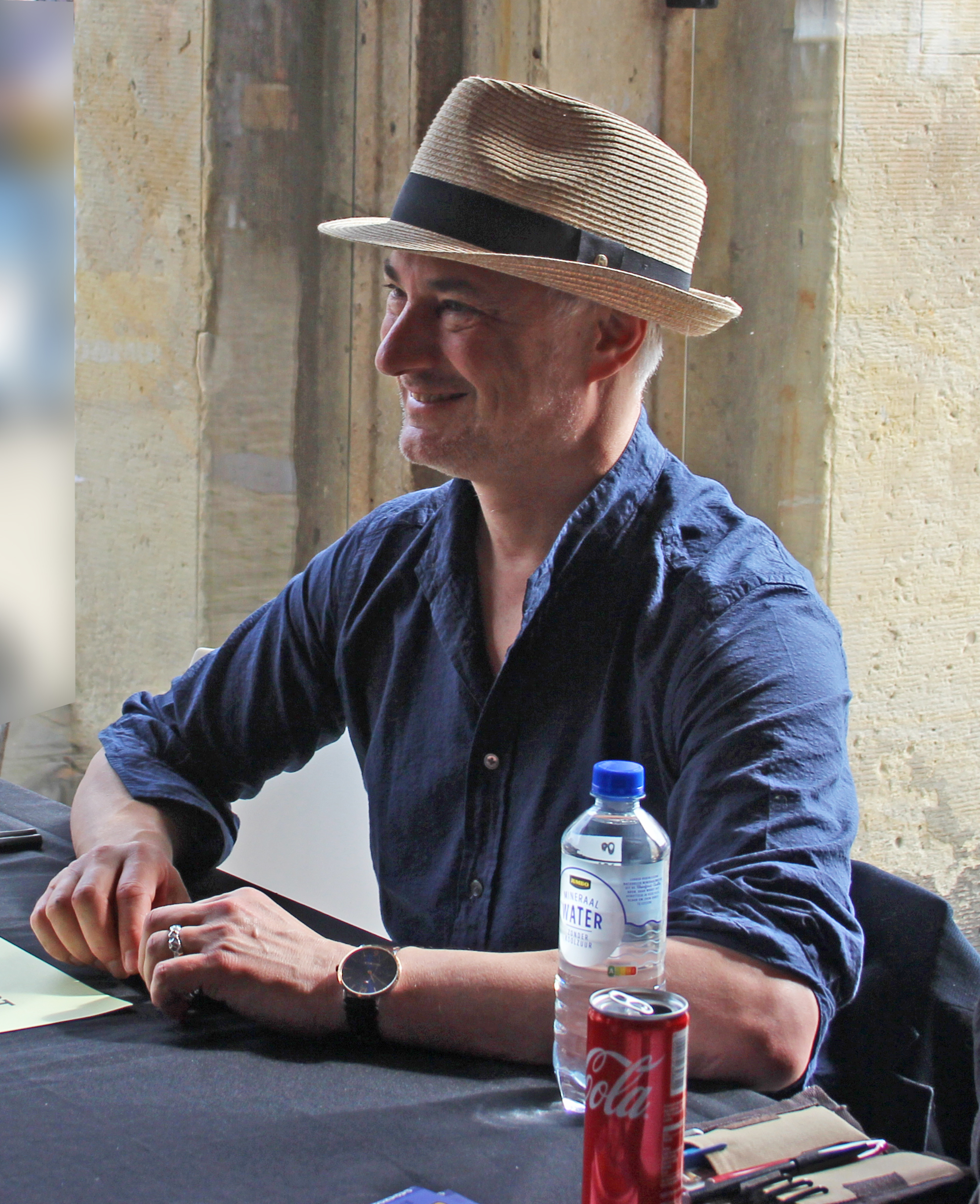
Richard Raaphorst developed the film without using ideas from his cancelled project Worst Case Scenario.

Raaphorst had worked on a similar film titled Worst Case Scenario but Frankenstein's Army is unrelated to it. The film originated after the cancellation of Raaphorst's earlier project Worst Case Scenario, a horror-comedy that was abandoned in 2009 because of financial problems, after its producers were unable to sell the project. The producers retained the rights so Raaphorst was unable to develop it, but an early version of the project was a prequel to Worst Case Scenario under the title Army of Frankenstein before it became a separate film. Raaphorst redeveloped the project and worked with artist Oleg Bondarenko to create a set of monster designs for a story set during the closing stages of World War II.

Development of the film gained momentum in 2009 after producer Todd Brown helped introduce the project to potential financiers through XYZ Films. Raaphorst and co-writer Miguel Tejada-Flores prepared a screenplay and production materials, and the title was later changed from Army of Frankenstein to Frankenstein's Army during development. In February 2011, MPI Media Group, XYZ Films and Pellicola entered into a co-production agreement for the film. MPI financed the production, while MPI and XYZ jointly handled international sales rights. Nick Jongerius and Daniel Koefoed of Pellicola, Todd Brown of XYZ Films, and Greg Newman served as producers.

In an interview with ComingSoon.net, Raaphorst said he chose the found footage format to make the audience feel like participants in the story rather than observers. He compared the approach to a video game, explaining that he wanted viewers to experience events from the characters' perspective. Raaphorst also said he wanted to avoid taking sides in a debate between good and evil, describing all of the film's characters as villains and leaving it up to the audience to decide who was right or wrong. According to him, the found-footage format helped him avoid what he called a "political trap". He also said that the rough, assembled look of found footage matched the Zombots, which are themselves made from a mixture of human remains and machinery.

=== Design ===
Raaphorst designed many of the film's creatures himself and created the term "zombots" to distinguish them from traditional zombies. He said that the designs were inspired by industrial machinery and diesel-era technology rather than steampunk influences. According to Raaphorst, the image of Boris Karloff as the square-headed Frankenstein monster was a major influence on the film's industrial creature designs.

Special FX model maker Xander Forterie helped create several prosthetic effects for the film, including Novikov's exposed intestines and Dieter's skull cap. He also worked on the construction and management of the Zombot props. Rogier Samuels served as the special FX supervisor and led the creation of the film's practical creature suits and gore effects. Several cast members performed multiple Zombot roles. Klemens Patijn portrayed any different Zombots, such as the Mosquito Man and the Wall Zombie with two hooks that appears during the underground trap sequence involving Vassili and his group.

=== Filming ===
External videos
- Frankenstein's Army (Richard Raaphorst 2013): The Making Of on YouTube, July 19, 2019 (video length: 30:11)

Principal photography began on March 5, 2012 at Karlovy Vary in Czechia. Earlier production plans called for filming in Prague and Amsterdam. The cast included Karel Roden as Viktor Frankenstein, Robert Gwilym as Novikov, Joshua Sasse as Sergei, Luke Newberry as Sasha, Alexander Mercury as Dmitri, Andrei Zayats as Vassili, Hon Ping Tang as Ivan, and Mark Stevenson as Alexei. Also appearing in supporting roles were Cristina Catalina as Eva, Jan de Lukovicz as Fritz, Zdenek Barinka as Hans, and Klaus Lucas as Dieter.

Although the film used CGI, most of the effects were practical; for example, stuntmen were set on fire. Raaphorst said he intentionally relied on practical effects and avoided heavy use of CGI in order to create a more physical and traditional monster film. The practical effects, inspired by John Carpenter's The Thing, necessitated what Raaphorst described as long, complicated single takes. He said it was worth it in the end, though he experienced doubt during shooting when he became ill.

== Release ==
Frankenstein's Army was promoted during the 2012 San Diego Comic-Con, where Raaphorst showed artwork, and two teaser clips. The film premiered at the International Film Festival Rotterdam on January 26, 2013. and released in the United States on July 26, 2013 with screenings and video-on-demand availability.

The film was also screened at Film4 FrightFest in London in August 2013. MPI Media Group and Dark Sky Films released it on home video on September 10, 2013. It had its market premiere at the European Film Market in Berlin. The DVD and Blu-ray release included a 30-minute making-of documentary and other bonus features covering the production and creature effects.

== Reception ==
=== Critical response ===
Review aggregator Rotten Tomatoes reports that 56% of 25 critics have given the film a positive review, with an average rating of 5.47/10. Metacritic, which assigns a weighted average score based on reviews, gives the film a score of 49 out of 100 based on nine reviews, indicating "mixed or average" reviews.

The film received mixed reviews from critics, who praised its creature effects and visual style but criticized its plot and found-footage presentation. It gained a cult following for its atmosphere and creature design. Scott Foundas of Variety wrote that the film as "short on plot" but praised its inventive creature effects. He also compared the film's "junkyard chic" to the steampunk films of Shinya Tsukamoto. John DeFore of The Hollywood Reporter wrote that the film's monsters and gory special effects will appeal to horror fans, but it should have focused more on black humor and satire to appeal to broader midnight movie audiences. Andy Webster of The New York Times praised the film's energy, inventiveness, and humor despite its limited narrative depth.

Ignatiy Vishnevetsky of The A.V. Club gave the film a C− and criticized its found-footage approach, while Jason Jenkins of Dread Central rated it 3 out of 5 stars and called it "a fun, furious, goofy and gory good time" for forgiving horror fans. Lauren Taylor of Bloody Disgusting rated it 1.5 out of 5 stars and said that the visuals and effects did not make up for the lack of a plot and unnecessary "found footage" style. Bill Gibron of PopMatters called it "an amazing steampunk splatter fest" whose visual imagery makes up for its narrative faults.

The film received several award nominations, including Best Makeup at the 2013 Fright Meter Awards and Best Makeup/Creature FX at the 2014 Chainsaw Awards. At the 2013 Sitges Film Festival, the film received a Special Mention for the Grand Prize of European Fantasy Film (Silver) in the Official Fantàstic Panorama section and was also nominated for the award.

=== Resident Evil Village comparison ===
Director Richard Raaphorst accused Capcom's Resident Evil Village of plagiarism in 2021 for the design of the monster Sturm, a walking corpse attached to a plane propeller which bears a similarity to a monster featured in Frankenstein's Army. Raaphorst said he did not expect to receive any royalties from Capcom. Although he believed that Resident Evil Village appeared to take inspiration from Frankenstein's Army, he noted that he did not own the rights to the film. The rights were held by MPI Media Group, the American company that helped finance and distribute the project during its production.

== Potential sequel ==
Following the film's release, Raaphorst expressed interest in developing a sequel and revealed that he had planned second and third installments before production on the original film began.

== See also ==
- List of films featuring Frankenstein's monster
