= Pedro Cunha (actor) =

Portuguese television actor

- Born: Pedro Miguel Santos da Cunha; 12 August 1980; Lisbon, Portugal
- Died: 28 April 2014 (aged 33); Lisbon, Portugal
- Occupation: Actor

Pedro Cunha (12 August 1980 – 28 April 2014) was a Portuguese actor who appeared in several TV series and soap operas in Portugal, England and Spain. He was found dead on 28 April 2014, after committing suicide.

== Filmography ==
- Riscos (Portugal)
- Olhos de Água (Portugal)
- Olá Pai (Portugal)
- Dream Team (England)
- MIR (Spain)
- Génesis — en la mente del asesino (Spain)
- Circulo Rojo (Spain)
- Soy el Solitario
- Assalto ao Santa Maria
- O Cônsul de Bordéus
