= Re-Animator (film series) =

Horror film series

- Re-Animator film series logo
- Directed by: Stuart Gordon; Brian Yuzna
- Based on: Herbert West–Reanimator by H. P. Lovecraft
- Starring: Jeffrey Combs; Bruce Abbott; Barbara Crampton; David Gale
- Release dates: 1985 (Re-Animator); 1990 (Bride of Re-Animator); 2003 (Beyond Re-Animator)
- Country: United States
- Language: English

Re-Animator is an American film series consisting of three horror films directed by Stuart Gordon and Brian Yuzna. Loosely based on the 1922 serialized short story "Herbert West–Reanimator" by H. P. Lovecraft, the films follow the exploits of Herbert West, the inventor of a serum that can re-animate deceased bodies. West is portrayed by Jeffrey Combs in all three films.

The first film in the series, Re-Animator, was released in 1985. Directed by Gordon and produced by Yuzna, it stars Combs alongside Bruce Abbott, Barbara Crampton, and David Gale. It was followed by a sequel, Bride of Re-Animator, in 1990, directed by Yuzna and again starring Combs and Abbott. The third film, Beyond Re-Animator, was released in 2003.

== Films ==
Film	Year	Director(s)	Screenwriter(s)	Producer(s)
Re-Animator	1985	Stuart Gordon	Stuart Gordon, William J. Norris, Dennis Paoli	Brian Yuzna
Bride of Re-Animator	1990	Brian Yuzna	Rick Fry, Woody Keith, Brian Yuzna	Brian Yuzna
Beyond Re-Animator	2003	Brian Yuzna	Miguel Tejada-Flores, José Manuel Gómez, Brian Yuzna	Brian Yuzna, Julio Fernández, Carlos Fernández

== Unproduced sequels ==
After the conclusion of Beyond Re-Animator, Brian Yuzna wanted to produce a sequel trilogy to the series. The first of which would have been titled House of Re-Animator and would have featured William H. Macy as a George W. Bush-inspired President of the United States who dies in office with Herbert West enlisted by the office to bring him back to life. The film would have seen Stuart Gordon as director and Dennis Paoli as writer, and the return of Jeffrey Combs as Herbert West and Bruce Abbott as Dan Cain.

The second film would have been titled Island of Re-Animator and seen Dr. West having set up a laboratory on a secluded island to continue his research in an The Island of Doctor Moreau-style story. Richard Raaphorst, a film director and concept artist who had worked on other Fantastic Factory productions, was tasked by Yuzna with creating some artwork for the film but Yuzna ultimately felt none of it worked in the world of Re-Animator. Some of Raaphorst's artwork was speculated to have been reused for his own directorial effort, Frankenstein's Army.

The final film in the trilogy would have been titled Re-Animator Begins and would have featured an amnesiac Herbert West rescued from an asylum by a young female doctor who takes him to Zürich where she is revealed to be the granddaughter of Dr. Hans Gruber from the first film who is still living in his re-animated state. The film would have seen Herbert West passing the torch of Re-Animator to Gruber's granddaughter.

The sequel trilogy ultimately never happened due to inability to secure financing. While an attempt to sell House of Re-Animator as a standalone movie was met with some interest, the sequel was deemed too expensive and the Great Recession effectively killed the project.

== Remakes ==
Attempts were made by Yuzna and John Penney in pitching a reboot of Re-Animator and while they were met with interest from companies such as Warner Bros., the two abandoned this route when the studios showed interest primarily in the name recognition and intended to play Re-Animator as a dark and serious horror film in contrast to the more darkly comedic nature of the prior films.

In 2017, an Italian version entitled Herbert West: Re-Animator was released with Emanuele Cerman as Dr. Herbert West.

A film by the name of Antihuman was set to release in early 2017 before being rebranded as Re-Animator: Evolution, with Johnathon Schaech in the lead role as Dr. Herbert West. The title was then changed to Herbert West: Re-Animator with a release date of December 15, 2018, and Schaech no longer on the cast list. It was described as "much darker, more thought-provoking, and more so grounded in science than the original film" and to be in tune with the original Lovecraft story. However, no news has been released since late 2016.

In April 2025, it was reported Jeffrey Lewis and Keith Previte of Lakewood Entertainment along with Andrew Trapani would be producing a new adaptation of Herbert West: Reanimator with The Haunting in Connecticut screenwriters Adam Simon and Tim Metcalfe set to write the script.

== Other media ==
Re-Animator: The Musical, based on the first movie, debuted in 2011.

=== Comic books ===
Between 1991 and 1992, Adventure Comics, a division of Malibu Comics, released two miniseries related to the films:

- Re-Animator, a three-issue adaptation of the first movie.
- Re-Animator: Dawn of the Re-Animator, a four-issue prequel to the films.

In 2004, the four-issue comic Army of Darkness vs. Re-Animator was released by Dynamite Entertainment. The crossover became the first four issues of the ongoing Army of Darkness comic series, and additional Army of Darkness/Re-Animator crossover comics would be released by Dynamite in 2013 and 2022. Dynamite would publish a standalone Re-Animator comic in 2015 as a sequel to the crossover, followed by Vampirella vs. Re-Animator in 2018.

In 2008 the character featured in issue 15 of the comic book series Hack/Slash. In the issue the character of Cassie must deal with the fallout from her long lost father colluding with West. The issue is set chronologically after the events in the third film.
