= Noble Craig =

American actor and Vietnam War veteran

- Born: Noble Henry Craig Jr. 6 August 1948; Los Angeles, California, U.S.
- Died: 26 April 2018 (aged 69); Torrance, California, U.S.
- Occupations: Actor; Stuntman; Mechanic
- Years active: 1973–1990
- Children: 6
- Military career
- Allegiance: United States
- Branch: United States Army
- Service years: 1967–1970
- Rank: Sergeant
- Unit: 82nd Airborne Division
- Conflicts: Vietnam War

Noble Henry Craig Jr. (August 6, 1948 – April 26, 2018) was an American character actor and stunt performer, who became known for his creature roles in horror films after having lost both of his legs and one of his arms in the Vietnam War.

== Early life and military service ==
Craig was born in Los Angeles, California on August 6, 1948. After graduating from North High School in Torrance, he was drafted into the United States Army on May 3, 1967, during the Vietnam War, and was sent to Vietnam in April 1969. On his twelfth day of duty while serving with the 82nd Airborne Division, he stepped on a buried artillery shell or land mine, causing him to lose both of his legs, his right arm, and most of the sight in his right eye.

== Acting career ==
After his medical discharge, Craig attended the University of California, Los Angeles on the G.I. Bill. He made his acting debut in the 1973 film Sssssss, in which he played Tim McGraw, "the Snake Man".

He later played a legless monster in the Poltergeist II: The Other Side and a sewer monster in Big Trouble in Little China, as well as a partially dissolved character in The Blob. He briefly portrayed Freddy Krueger in the climax of A Nightmare on Elm Street 5: The Dream Child, and played one of Herbert West's failed experiments in Bride of Re-Animator.

== Personal life ==
Craig was married twice, and had six children. Aside from acting, he was an avid sportsman, ran a skeet and trap range, and worked as a mechanic.

=== Death ===
Craig died of natural causes in Torrance, California on April 26, 2018, at the age of 69.

== Filmography ==
| Year | Film | Role | Ref(s) |
|---|---|---|---|
| 1973 | Sssssss | Tim McGraw, the Snake Man | |
| 1986 | Poltergeist II: The Other Side | Vomit Creature | |
| 1986 | Big Trouble in Little China | Sewer Monster | |
| 1988 | The Blob | Puddle Soldier | |
| 1989 | A Nightmare on Elm Street 5: The Dream Child | Freddy Krueger | |
| 1990 | Bride of Re-Animator | Crypt Creature | |
