= Beyond Re-Animator =

2003 horror film

- Theatrical release poster
- Directed by: Brian Yuzna
- Screenplay by: José Manuel Gómez
- Story by: Miguel Tejada Flores
- Produced by: Brian Yuzna; Julio Fernández
- Starring: Jeffrey Combs; Jason Barry; Elsa Pataky; Enrique Arce; Nico Baixas; Lolo Herrero; Raquel Gribler; Simón Andreu; Santiago Segura
- Cinematography: Andreu Rebés
- Edited by: Bernat Vilaplana
- Music by: Xavier Capellas
- Production companies: Fantastic Factory; Castelao Productions
- Distributed by: Filmax (Spain); Lions Gate Entertainment (U.S.)
- Release date: April 4, 2003
- Running time: 95 minutes
- Countries: Spain; United States
- Language: English
- Budget: $3 million

Beyond Re-Animator is a 2003 Spanish horror film directed by Brian Yuzna and starring Jeffrey Combs, Jason Barry, Elsa Pataky, Simón Andreu and Santiago Segura. It is the third and final installment in the Re-Animator film series.

An international co-production of Spain and the United States, Beyond Re-Animator premiered on the Sci-Fi Channel, though it was produced independently and acquired by the channel only as a distributor; this showing was cut to a TV-PG rating. The film received a limited theatrical run in the U.S. and was assigned an R rating, and a slightly longer unrated cut was released on home media in some countries.

== Plot ==
For the past thirteen years, Dr. Herbert West has been serving a prison sentence due to a murder at the hands of one of his zombies. With what scant supplies he has on hand in the prison medical center, Dr. West has been capable of performing only extremely basic experiments on rats. However, his lack of supplies does not prevent him from uncovering a key element in his re-animation process. Dr. West has discovered "NPE" (Nano-Plasmic Energy), an energy that can be extracted from the brain of a living organism through an electrocution-like process, to be stored in a capsule resembling a small light bulb. The capsule can then be connected to a corpse and used in conjunction with West's previously developed reagent to restore the former dead to a lifelike state. The NPE prevents the degeneration seen in previous instances, where the reanimated are nothing more than mindless zombies. Used together with the reagent, reanimated corpses regain their skills, memories, and motor functions and nearly fully resemble normal humans.

When a young doctor named Howard Phillips comes to work at the prison, West is assigned to assist the new doctor. Due to Phillips' interest in Dr. West's research, West is able to attain the supplies and tools needed to bring his experiments to the next level. It is revealed that Phillips is the younger brother of the teenage girl who was killed by West's zombie (he is shown watching West being taken away by the cops) and came to the prison for the explicit purpose of working with him. Despite his interest, Phillips still maintains an ethical reluctance to allow West's research to full completion. In the meantime, journalist Laura Olney, covering a story for her newspaper at the prison, meets and begins an affair with Dr. Phillips, and they fall in love. This new romance only temporarily postpones West's experiment, however. After the warden of the prison, also infatuated with Laura, attempts to seduce Laura himself, she resists and he angrily kills her.

Crushed by Laura's death, Dr. Phillips succumbs to Dr. West's wishes and his experiments are allowed to literally take on new life. West & Phillips revive Laura with the NPE, although it is quickly seen that the dangerous side effects of West's past work are still present with the NPE. Eventually, the warden of the prison uncovers West's experiments and moves to put an end to them, but he is killed by West, and subsequently re-animated. West uses the NPE from a prisoner's pet rat, causing some unexpected side effects in the warden's behavior. It quickly manifests itself as the prison descends into utter chaos as a riot breaks out, with vials of the reagent circulating through the population. Soon, it is unclear who is dead, who is alive, and who has been exposed to the agent.

When the chaos finally settles from the bloody prison riot, West escapes captivity before the guards appear by stealing Phillips' I.D. when he comes across Phillips weeping over Laura's decapitated body. As police and authorities take control of the prison, Phillips is dragged away as he and Laura's head start laughing. Herbert West is shown putting on his glasses outside the prison and disappears into the night to continue his research. During the end credits a comical rat versus zombie severed-penis boxing matching is seen.

== Cast ==
- Jeffrey Combs as Dr. Herbert West
- Jason Barry as Dr. Howard Phillips
- Elsa Pataky as Laura Olney
- Simón Andreu as Warden Brando
- Santiago Segura as Speedball
- Lolo Herrero as Sergeant Moncho
- Enrique Arce as Cabrera
- Bárbara Elorrieta as Emily Phillips
- Raquel Gribler as Nurse Vanessa
- Joaquín Ortega as Officer Falcon
- Daniel Ortiz as Winni

== Production ==
Brian Yuzna following the release of Bride of Re-Animator had wanted to continue the franchise and upon being approached 10 years later by Spanish company Filmax in setting up their horror film production arm Fantastic Factory the opportunity presented itself for a third Re-Animator to be produced. As Yuzna had exhausted the source material of the original H. P. Lovecraft short story Herbert West–Reanimator, he approached writer John Penney, with whom he had collaborated on Return of the Living Dead 3, for potential ideas for continuation. While Penney's treatment ultimately wasn't used, the concept of Herbert West now serving a prison sentence became the basis for what would become Beyond Re-Animator. The initial draft of the film would have brought back Bruce Abbott's Dan Cain who turned state's evidence against West and is now a successful, albeit vice ridden, transplant surgeon who is using what remains of West's re-animation serum in his surgical procedures and is forced by a politically ambitious district attorney to use the re-animation serum on a serial killer's recently deceased victim in order to catch them. Due to the amount of time that had passed between films as well as the impossibility of Spain convincingly doubling for the United States, Yuzna decided to scale back the film to be more of a confined prison movie as well as Jeffrey Combs as Herbert West returning to the role, Jason Barry was brought in to play a more youthful foil for West.

== Reception ==
On the review aggregator website Rotten Tomatoes, the film holds an approval rating of 52% based on 21 critics. The consensus summarizes: "Beyond Re-Animator substitutes relentless gore and juvenile shock for genuine tension, offering sporadic visual inventiveness and campy black comedy but largely collapsing into queasy spectacle with little substance." AllMovie gave the film a mixed review, calling it "almost a remake of the original." Jonathan Holland of Variety writes that the film is "sometimes shocking but rarely scary" and "calculated to appeal only to hardcore gore hounds." In a mixed review, Patrick Naugle of DVD Verdict called it "somewhat of a letdown" but "worth at least one viewing". Writing for Bloody Disgusting, Brad Miska rates the film 2.5/5 stars and called it "a fun movie, but nothing special."

In their book Lurker in the Lobby: A Guide to the Cinema of H. P. Lovecraft, Andrew Migliore and John Strysik write: "If your idea of Lovecraftian fun is Combs' acidic one-liners, and digitally enhanced gore effects that weren't available for the other two films, then by all means have a look. But if you're comparing this film to the still classic Re-Animator, well... This third try is only a shadow of the gonzo wit of the original and not nearly as entertaining."

Zombiemania: 80 Movies to Die For author Arnold T. Blumberg wrote that "Beyond Re-Animator is better than its immediate predecessor" and that "Combs slips back into the white shirt and black tie, wielding the hypo of green goo like he never put it down, but his performance is nicely tempered by the passage of time, giving us a West that lacks some of his youthful confidence but none of his single-minded desire to pursue 'The Work.'" Bruce G. Hallenbeck, in his book Comedy-Horror Films: A Chronological History, 1914-2008, again described Brian Yuzna's direction as "competent but uninspired," but said the film's biggest problem is that most of the cast are Spanish actors whose voices were obviously dubbed over to conceal their accents, resulting in a lack of both tension and comedy. He commented that Jeffrey Combs is still outstanding in the role of Herbert West, but his performance is muted due to a complete lack of strong co-stars to play off of.

== Home media ==
Beyond Re-Animator was given a straight-to-video release on December 23, 2003.

In 2011 Arrow Video released a Special Edition DVD of the film, with the following special features:

- Audio commentary with director Brian Yuzna
- 'All in the Head' Brian Yuzna on the Re-Animator Chronicles (50 mins)
- Original trailer
- Reversible cover sleeve with original and newly commissioned artwork by Tom Hodge 'The Dude Designs'
- Double-sided fold-out poster featuring new artwork
- Collector's booklet featuring 'World of Lovecraft' and an interview with star Jeffrey Combs by author and critic Calum Waddell, as well as an extract from H. P. Lovecraft's original story ‘Herbert West – Reanimator’

== Unmade follow-ups ==
After the conclusion of Beyond Re-Animator, Brian Yuzna wanted to produce a sequel trilogy to the series. The first of which would have been titled House of Re-Animator and would have featured William H. Macy as a George W. Bush inspired President of the United States who dies in office with Herbert West enlisted by the office to bring him back to life. The film would have seen Stuart Gordon as director and Dennis Paoli as writer, and the return of Jeffrey Combs as Herbert West and Bruce Abbott as Dan Cain.

The second film would have been titled Island of Re-Animator and seen Dr. West having set up a laboratory on a secluded island to continue his research. Richard Raaphorst, a concept artist who had worked on other Fantastic Factory productions, was tasked by Yuzna with creating some artwork for the film but Yuzna ultimately felt none of it worked in the world of Re-Animator. Some of Raaphorst's artwork were speculated to have been reused for his own directorial effort, Frankenstein's Army.

The final film in the trilogy would have been titled Re-Animator Begins and would have featured an amnesiac Hebert West rescued from an asylum by a young female doctor who takes him to Zürich where it's revealed she's the granddaughter of Dr. Hans Gruber from the first film who is still living in his re-animated state. The film would have seen Hebert West passing the torch of Re-Animator to Gruber's granddaughter.

The sequel trilogy ultimately never happened due to inability to secure financing, and while an attempt to sell House of Re-Animator as a standalone movie was met with some interest the sequel was deemed too expensive and the Great Recession effectively killed the project.

Further attempts were made by Yuzna and John Penney in pitching a reboot of Re-Animator and while they were met with interest from companies such as Warner Bros., the two abandoned this route when the studios showed interest primarily in the name recognition and intended to play Re-Animator as a dark and serious horror film in contrast to the more darkly comedic nature of the prior films.

== See also ==
- List of Spanish films of 2003
