= Herbert West–Reanimator =

1922 horror short story by H. P. Lovecraft

- Short story by H. P. Lovecraft
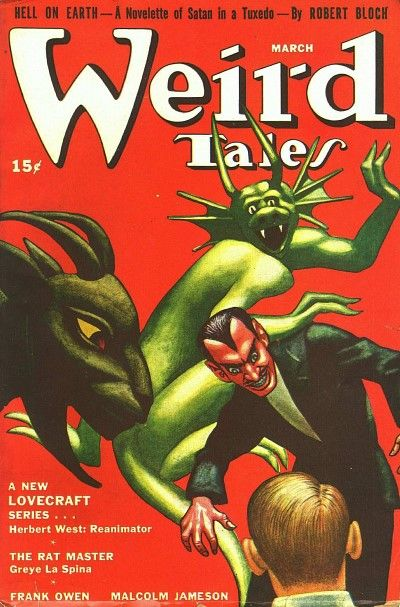
- March 1942 issue of Weird Tales advertising the story as "a new Lovecraft series"

Text available at Wikisource
- Country: United States
- Language: English
- Genres: Horror, Science fiction

Publication
- Published in: Home Brew
- Publication type: Magazine
- Media type: Print (periodical)
- Publication date: February–July 1922

"Herbert West–Reanimator" is a horror short story by American writer H. P. Lovecraft. It was written between October 1921 and June 1922. It was first serialized in February through July 1922 in the amateur publication Home Brew. The story was the basis of the 1985 horror film Re-Animator and its sequels, in addition to numerous other adaptations in various media.

The story is the first to mention Lovecraft's fictional Miskatonic University. It is also one of the first depictions of zombies as scientifically reanimated corpses, with animalistic and uncontrollable temperaments.

== Plot ==
Lovecraft originally serialized the story in Home Brew Vol. 1 #1–6, an amateur magazine published by his friend George Julian Houtain.

=== From the Dark ===
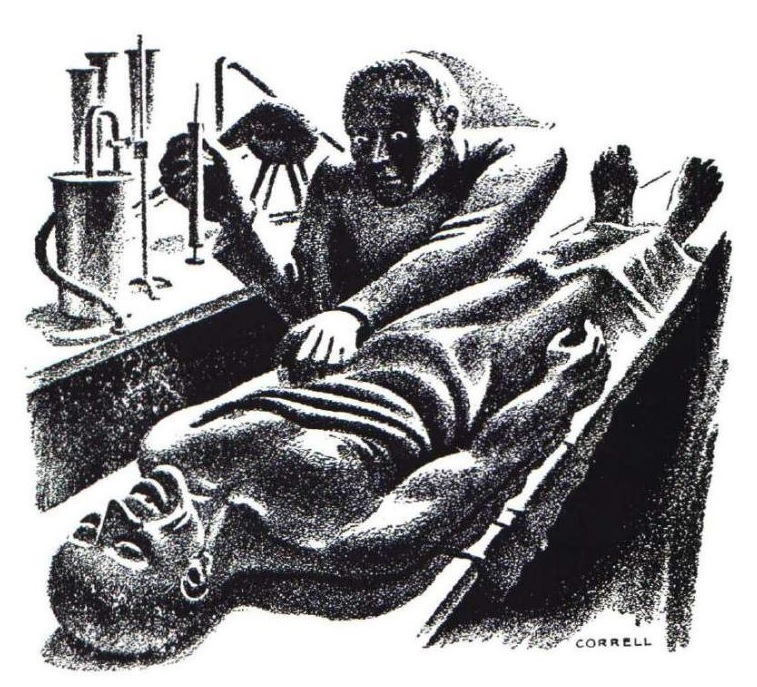
Illustration to the story by Richard V. Correll (Weird Tales, 1942)

The narrator recounts his history with the title character, who has recently disappeared. He details his time as a medical student at Miskatonic University, when the narrator became fascinated by West's theories, which postulate that the human body is simply a complex, organic machine which can be "restarted". West eventually realizes he must experiment on human subjects. The two men steal supplies from their medical school and set up their lab in an abandoned farmhouse. At first, they pay a group of men to rob graves for them, but none of the experiments are successful. West and the narrator then rob graves themselves. One night, they steal the corpse of a construction worker who died that morning in an accident. They take it back to the farmhouse and inject it with West's serum, but nothing happens. Later, an inhuman scream is heard from within the room containing the corpse. Moved by instinct, they flee. West accidentally sets the lab on fire after tripping over a lantern while escaping. The next day, the newspaper reports that a grave in Potter's Field, violently molested the night before, displays the claws of a beast.

=== The Plague-Daemon ===
Some time after the fire, West's research is stunted when Dr. Allen Halsey, the dean of the medical school, refuses to allow him access to human cadavers or the university's dissection lab. West has a stroke of luck, though, when he and the narrator are called to help tend to the many dying victims of a local typhoid outbreak. West begins injecting his patients with a new serum, which has no greater effect than to cause some of the bodies' eyes to open. Eventually, Halsey succumbs to typhoid, and, as a final act of twisted respect for his former rival, West steals his corpse to reanimate. West and the narrator take the body back to West's room at a boarding house, where they inject it with the new serum. Halsey does in fact reanimate, but, inexplicably, he is less intelligent and more violent than their previous experiment. After beating West and the narrator into unconsciousness, Halsey embarks on a killing spree, beating and murdering over a dozen people before he is apprehended by the police. The cannibal murderer is soon committed to a local mental institution. West curses the fact that too much time had elapsed and that Halsey's brain had deteriorated.

=== Six Shots by Midnight ===
Now licensed doctors, West and the narrator go into practice together in the small New England town of Bolton, purchasing a house near the local cemetery to have easy access to corpses. The two experiment on several corpses with varying outcomes, but they do not achieve a breakthrough. Still intent upon successfully reanimating a human being, they claim the body of a boxing champion who died of a head wound in an illegal back-alley street fight. Gamblers betting on the fight arrange for West to dispose of the body, as it clears them of any crime. West and the narrator hurriedly take the body back to the lab and inject it with another new serum. When nothing happens, they take the corpse out to a meadow and bury it. Several days later, there are reports around town of a missing child. The child's mother dies during a fit of hysteria due to her weak heart, and the father tries to kill West in a fit of rage because West could not save her. That night, West and the narrator are startled by an aggressive pounding on their back door. Opening the door, West and the narrator come face to face with the boxer's corpse, covered in mildew and dirt and hunched over at the back entrance. Hanging from the boxer's mouth is the arm of the missing child. Almost instantly, West kills the boxer by emptying an entire revolver into him.

=== The Scream of the Dead ===
Some time after West's killing of the reanimated boxer, the narrator returns home from vacation to discover the perfectly preserved corpse of a man in the home he shares with West. West explains that during the narrator's absence, he perfected a type of embalming fluid that perfectly preserves a corpse as it is the moment the chemical is injected into the bloodstream; injected at the precise moment of death, the chemical prevents decomposition from even beginning. West reveals to the narrator that the dead man is a traveling salesman who had a heart attack during a physical examination; as the man died before West's eyes, he was able to preserve it with the embalming fluid and has been waiting for the narrator to return so that the two of them can reanimate the body together. West injects the body with his latest serum. Signs of life gradually begin to appear. When the narrator questions the man, he mouths words with seeming rationality and intent. Just before the man returns to the dead, he begins screaming and thrashing violently, revealing in a horrible scream that he was in fact murdered by West.

=== The Horror from the Shadows ===
Five years later, West and the narrator become involved in World War I as a means to procure more bodies. Serving as a medic in Flanders, West has gone beyond the point of simply trying to reanimate corpses; his experiments now include isolating parts of the body and reanimating them independently in an attempt to prove their machine-like quality. On the battlefield, West befriends his commanding officer and fellow medic, Major Sir Eric Moreland Clapham-Lee, and shares with him his theories and methods on reanimation. Shortly thereafter, Clapham-Lee suffers near-decapitation and dies when his plane is shot down. West immediately begins work on Clapham-Lee's body and injects the trunk of his body with his serum and places the head in a vat. The corpse comes to life and begins thrashing violently, reliving its last moments of life. Clapham-Lee's severed head begins shouting from across the room. The building is then destroyed by a bomb shell. West and the narrator survive, but there is no sign of Clapham-Lee's head or body. The two men assume that he was vaporized in the blast, although West is since known to speak fearfully of a headless doctor with the power of reanimation.

=== The Tomb-Legions ===
A year after returning from the war, West has moved into a house which is directly connected to an ancient system of catacombs from settler times. While reading the newspaper one night, West comes across an article detailing a series of strange, seemingly nonsensical events involving a riot at an insane asylum. A wax-headed man (Clapham-Lee) followed by a group of disturbing-looking followers carrying a box had demanded that the detained "cannibal" killer (Halsey) be released to them. When the invaders were refused exchange for the killer, they took him by force. West spends the remainder of the night in a near-catatonic state until someone comes to the door. The narrator answers only to find a group of men. One of the figures presents the narrator with the large box, which the narrator then gives to West. West refuses to open the box and insists that they incinerate it. The two men carry it to the basement and burn it. As soon as the box burns, the zombies tear through the wall of West's home via the catacombs. Leaving the narrator alone, the zombies soon attack West. Realizing that his own death is imminent, West allows the zombies to disembowel him. As a final insult, Clapham-Lee decapitates West's corpse before leading his army of zombies off into the night. The narrator does not reveal much to the police about West, and they disbelieve the information he does reveal since the catacomb wall seems intact and undisturbed. The narrator is forever haunted, considered mad, by his knowledge of what transpired and the lack of resolution regarding the raised corpses.

== Characters ==
Herbert West
- 'Re-Animator' character
- Cover art for ReAnimator #1 (April 2015) by Jae Lee
- First appearance: "Herbert West—Reanimator"
- Created by: H. P. Lovecraft
- Portrayed by: Jeffrey Combs

In-universe information
- Gender: Male
- Occupation: Scientist
- Nationality: American

- Herbert West: The inventor of a special solution, or "reagent", that can resurrect the dead. He is portrayed as a brilliant, narcissistic, and intensely driven young man of an amoral nature, traits carried over into the 1985 film. His arrogance and lack of respect for life (and death) prove to be his undoing. He is depicted as the inventor of a solution that can re-animate deceased bodies. However, most subjects that have undergone the re-animation process turn violent and, after failed attempts to return to their own graves, wreak havoc. In Lovecraft's tale, Herbert West was ostracized by his fellow medical students because he believed he could overcome death and had only one friend: the unnamed narrator of the story. West was portrayed by actor Jeffrey Combs in the 1985 film adaptation of the story. Combs reprised the role in the film's two sequels, Bride of Re-Animator (1990) and Beyond Re-Animator (2003). In 2013, West as portrayed by Combs was selected by Empire magazine as the 42nd greatest horror film character, describing him as "one of cinema's greatest mad scientists". Outside of the film series, the character has appeared in comic books, novels, and video games.
- The narrator: West's only friend, the narrator initially attaches himself to West in college out of a kind of hero worship mentality, awed at the daring of West's experiments. Over time, though, as West's experiments become more morally reprehensible, and West seems to lose interest in science and instead indulge in sheer perversity, the narrator comes to fear West and becomes a kind of slave to him, too afraid of West's capacity for evil to outright abandon him. In the 1985 film adaptation, the character is named Dan Cain (played by Bruce Abbott).
- Dean Allen Halsey: The Dean of Miskatonic University's medical school. He does not take West's theories about reanimation seriously and the narrator characterizes him as benevolently old-fashioned and closed-minded. Dr. Halsey dies from being severely overworked during a typhoid outbreak and is hailed as a community hero. West reanimates his body as a sign of respect, to convince him – and others – of the validity of his theories. Halsey, however, returns to life as an inarticulate, cannibalistic ghoul. The reanimated Halsey's behavior is mistaken for insanity and he is locked in a mental institution.
- Major Sir Eric Moreland Clapham-Lee: West and the narrator's commanding officer during World War I. As the narrator does not know him terribly well, little information is given about him, other than he shares West's perverse fascination with cheating death. After Maj. Clapham-Lee dies when his plane is shot down, West decides to "honor" Clapham-Lee by chopping off his head and trying to bring his body back to life. The experiment backfires when the decapitated body revives, acting out its final actions before dying in a plane crash, and the severed head also revives yelling for his co-pilot to "jump". The reanimated Maj. Clapham-Lee, now wearing a head of wax and the original head in a black case, spends the next year finding the "survivors" of West's experiments, which West was not fast enough to kill off, leading them in an assault on West in revenge for his attempts to use them to play God. West is torn apart, while the zombie of Clapham-Lee takes the head, since West took his.

== Inspiration ==
According to his letters, Lovecraft wrote the story as a parody of Mary Shelley's Frankenstein. He drops in numerous Frankenstein references (even hinting at the poetry of Samuel Taylor Coleridge, as Shelley did).

== Reaction ==
Lovecraft claimed to be unhappy with the work, writing it only because he was being paid five dollars for each installment. He disliked the requirement that each installment end with a cliffhanger and begin with a recap of the previous installment. The book Science Fiction: The Early Years called "Herbert West–Reanimator" "wretched work". In an overview of the Re-Animator films, Bruce Hallenbeck commented that "'Herbert West: Reanimator' is not one of Lovecraft's better tales; it's over-the-top, clichéd and blatantly racist. ... What it does possess in abundance is a love of the Gothic horror tale; ultimately, the story is both an homage to and an affectionate parody of Mary Shelley's Frankenstein." Lovecraft scholar S. T. Joshi claimed that "Herbert West–Reanimator" is "universally acknowledged as Lovecraft's poorest work".

In 2013, West as portrayed by Jeffrey Combs was selected by Empire magazine as the 42nd greatest horror film character, describing him as "one of cinema's greatest mad scientists". When the list was updated in 2020, West placed 43rd.

== Adaptations and appearances ==
=== Comics and periodicals ===
- "Herbert West, Reanimated", written as a round-robin serial by Robert Price and others, for Crypt of Cthulhu #64 (1989), is a sort of sequel in which Sir Eric Moreland Chapman-Lee resurrects and reassembles Dr. West, who then escapes, kills and resurrects his assistant, and resumes his increasingly wild experiments with life & death, leading to mind-transfers & cloning.
- Adventure Publications, an imprint of Malibu Comics, published two series related to the films starting in 1991. First was a three-issue comic-book adaptation of the first film, scripted by Steven Philip Jones and drawn by Christopher Jones. It was followed by an original four-issue prequel titled Re-Animator: Dawn of the Re-Animator, written by Bill Spangler. In 2017 Arrow Video included reprints of these comics in their Blu-ray DVD collections of the two films.
- In issue #14 of the magazine From the Tomb (released in June 2004), edited by Peter Normanton, various other 1950s horror comics' homages to Herbert West are discussed, including "Atlas' Adventures" in Weird Worlds #24, where Dr. Karl Veblen created a "life generator" serum. He had a co-conspirator arranged to revive himself after death with it, but the co-conspirator returned Cleopatra instead.
- Dynamite Entertainment has produced a comic, Army of Darkness vs. Re-Animator, a crossover with Herbert West from Lovecraft's short story, "Herbert West–Reanimator", and well known from the film Re-Animator and its sequels. However, Army of Darkness vs. Re-Animator is inspired by neither the film Re-Animator nor the original short story; instead it portrays West as an immortal supervillain in league with Yog-Sothoth, battling Ash Williams from the Evil Dead film series.
- In 2016 Caliber Comics published all six Herbert West stories in "H. P. Lovecraft's Reanimator Tales." The book was edited by Steven Philip Jones. An original sequel, "The Empty House on Harley Street", and a radio script for From the Dark written by Jones also appear alongside Lovecraft's seminal essay Supernatural Horror in Literature.
- Herbert West is the doctor that Mayor Harvey Dent sees in the Batman Elseworlds comic book miniseries, The Doom That Came To Gotham.
- Herbert West makes a guest appearance in the Devil's Due Publishing series Hack/Slash (#15–17) in a crossover called "Hack/Slash vs. Re-Animator" where the father of the main heroine, Cassie Hack, is an assistant to Herbert. During one of his experiments, he reanimates her mother, the Lunch Lady, who almost starts a killing spree. However, with Cassie's help, he destroys the Lunch Lady and eventually disappears from Cassie and Vlad's sight. It is hinted that the government is now interested in his work.
- West is a main character in the Zenescope Entertainment comic Chronicles of Doctor Herbert West, essentially a modern retelling of the Lovecraftian novel in which the hidden narrator is now Megan, who is his lover and girlfriend while in his college years, and his obsession with death is now explained as the byproduct of a childhood trauma: while going to church with his devout family, he saw his mother and sister run over by a bus. He renounces the idea of an immortal soul reaching a heavenly afterlife, swearing that he will find a way to bring back his loved ones. It appears to currently be on hiatus.
- Randy MilHolland's webcomic Something Positive contains a musical adaptation of Herbert West in the "Out of Tune" storyline.

=== Films ===
Jeffrey Combs as Herbert West in Bride of Re-Animator

- Stuart Gordon's film Re-Animator (1985) is the most famous adaptation. Updated to a contemporary setting, Re-Animator takes its plot and characters from the first two episodes of the serial, depicting West as a medical student at Miskatonic University. The film is set over a fairly short period of time where West and Cain are still medical students, whereas the short story played out over the span of decades. The Bride of Re-Animator (1990) uses material from the last two episodes. In the first two films the equivalent of West's nameless companion is Dr. Daniel Cain, played by Bruce Abbott, who finds himself embroiled in West's experiments. Bride was followed by Beyond Re-Animator (2003), which moved Herbert West to a prison and had very little to do with Lovecraft's story.
- Director Dylan Mars Greenberg has produced and directed a film titled Dr. West: A Reanimator Parody.
- In 2017, Italian filmmaker Ivan Zuccon made an adaptation filmed in Italian titled Herbert West: Re-Animator. It stars Emanuele Cerman as Herbert West and Alessio Cherubini as Herbert West, Junior.
- West is also a character in the Swedish Lovecraftian horror film Kammaren. The scriptwriters did a Swedish take on the name and it became Herbert Vest. He was played by the Swedish actor Kaj Stenberg.
- Herbert West appears in a post-credits scene in the 2020 film Castle Freak.

=== Games ===
- The story's narrative forms part of the plot of a video game based on Lovecraft's work, Call of Cthulhu: The Wasted Land (2012).
- The online flash game Deanimator is based on H. P. Lovecraft's original character.
- West is a main character in the Japanese video game Operation Darkness, a WWII-era tactical-RPG/third-person shooter about an Allied special forces unit that possesses supernatural abilities. West is the team medic. (In the English version of the game, West is renamed "Herbert East.")
- In the video game Obscure 2, the player picks up a keycard in the hospital belonging to a man named Herbert West.
- In the endless runner game Zombie Tsunami, the player at one point unlocks a potion called "Herbert West's Finest Reanimation Serum".
- In the video game Sherlock Holmes: The Devil's Daughter, a pamphlet promoting Bedlam Asylum states to "Contact Dr. Herbert West for questions"

=== Literature and audiobooks ===
- An audiobook version of the short story, published in 1999, is performed by Jeffrey Combs, who played Herbert West in the three film versions.
- Audrey Driscoll's novel The Friendship of Mortals (2010) expands on Lovecraft's story. Driscoll's primary focus is the relationship between West and the narrator, who is neither nameless nor a physician, but a Miskatonic University librarian named Charles Milburn. The plot roughly follows the original but adheres to the premise that West is undone by his experiments. He also the main character in Driscoll's Islands of the Gulf (2012) and Hunting the Phoenix (2012).
- A radio-drama adaption of the short story was published in 2017 by the Secret Cabal Gaming Podcast, with Herbert West being played by Patrick Kelly and the narrator being played by Jamie Keagy.
- In 2015, writer Joshua Chaplinsky remodeled the cover of the film Re-Animator, starring Kanye West, and created a spin story where West tried to revive a dead hip hop scene.
- Herbert West and elements form The Plague-Daemon feature prominently in Lovecraftian: The Shipwright Circle by Steven Philip Jones. The Lovecraftian series reimagines the weird tales of H. P. Lovecraft into one single universe modern epic.
- The character of Herbert West has had brief cameo appearances in Kim Newman's Anno Dracula series novels The Bloody Red Baron and Dracula Cha Cha Cha, serving as a colleague of Dr. Moreau, Jakob Ten Brincken, and Doctor Septimus Pretorius.
- West is an important, but peripheral character in Pete Rawlik's novel Reanimators (2013), in which his previously unnamed colleague is identified as Daniel Cain, using the name assigned him in the Stuart Gordon movie. The novel tells the story of a previously unknown rival of West's, as well as the secret history of Lovecraft's Arkham country.

=== Anime ===
- The Lovecraft-based anime series Demonbane reimagines Herbert West as a guitar-playing lunatic mad scientist.

=== Music ===
- "Herbert West" is the title of a 2007 song by UK band Heartwear Process.
- "Herbert West" is also the title of a 2008 song by US band Pipe Supply, named by Jiggly J. Slickwood as a tribute to the Re-Animator movies.
- "Herbert West Starter Kit" is the title of a 2016 song by US rapper Extra Kool.
- "Herbert West" was also the name of a rock band based in Barrow-in-Furness in the 1980s.
- Herbert West is referenced by name in the song "Re-Animator" by Brazilian metal band "Blasfemador", the song pays homage to the short story.

== Other appearances ==
- A resurrected Herbert West appears in the short story "The Empty House on Harley Street" by Steven Philip Jones in the anthology "Reanimator: The Grewsome Adventures of Herbert West" from Caliber Comics .
- Herbert West is one of the characters in the novel "Lovecraftian: The Shipwright Circle" by Steven Philip Jones and published by Caliber Comics . The "Lovecraftian" novel series reimagines the stories of H. P. Lovecraft as a single-universe narrative.
- Herbert West has a main role in the parody musical A Shoggoth on the Roof, published by the H. P. Lovecraft Historical Society.
- The Black Phoenix Alchemy Lab has a perfume called "Herbert West" in its A Picnic in Arkham collection.
- "Herbert West" appears in the radio drama series Our Fair City as a slightly crazed re-animator/scientist.
- The story, along with "From Beyond", was adapted into the 2022 web series The Resonator for Full Moon Features.

== Sources ==
- Lovecraft, Howard P. (1986) [1922]. "Herbert West—Reanimator". In S. T. Joshi (ed.). Dagon and Other Macabre Tales (9th corrected printing ed.). Sauk City, WI: Arkham House. ISBN 0-87054-039-4. Definitive version.
- Lovecraft, Howard P. (1999) [1922]. "Herbert West—Reanimator". In Joshi, S. T.; Cannon, Peter (eds.). More Annotated Lovecraft (1st ed.). New York City: Dell. ISBN 0-440-50875-4. With explanatory footnotes.
- Taniguchi, G.; Daitoku, T.; Terakawa, H. (2008). "Mystery of the zombies! Hogback's nightmarish research laboratory". One Piece. Fuji TV. TV episode.
- Herbert West: Reanimator by H. P. Lovecraft
- Lovecraft, Howard P. (1986) [1922]. "Herbert West—Reanimator". In S. T. Joshi (ed.). Dagon and Other Macabre Tales (9th corrected printing ed.). Sauk City, WI: Arkham House. ISBN 978-0-87054-039-4. Definitive version.
- Lovecraft, Howard P. (1999) [1922]. "Herbert West—Reanimator". In S. T. Joshi; Peter Cannon (eds.). More Annotated Lovecraft (1st ed.). New York City, NY: Dell. ISBN 978-0-440-50875-5. With explanatory footnotes.
