= The Brain (1988 film) =

- VHS cover
- Directed by: Edward Hunt
- Story by: Barry Pearson
- Produced by: Don Haig
- Starring: Tom Bresnahan; Cynthia Preston; David Gale
- Cinematography: Gilles Corbeil
- Music by: Paul Zaza
- Production companies: Brightstar Films; Shapiro-Glickenhaus Entertainment
- Distributed by: Brightstar Films
- Release date: November 4, 1988
- Running time: 91 minutes
- Country: Canada
- Language: English

The Brain is a 1988 Canadian science fiction horror film depicting a giant brain-like alien that mentally enslaves a town's residents.

== Plot ==
Dr. Anthony Berol Blake runs Independent Thinking, a television show promoting a self-help, quasi-religious program resembling Scientology. But Blake isn't making his audience think any more independently – with the help of an alien organism he calls The Brain, he is using brainwashing and mind control. The only thing that stands between them and world domination is a brilliant but troubled high school student, named Jim Majelewski, with a penchant for pranks.

After being caught flushing sodium down a school toilet, Jim is punished and given a warning that he'll be suspended and won't graduate if he keeps doing pranks; reluctantly, Jim agrees to enlist in Blake's program as an alternative. He is then subjected to Blake's experiments, but he is immune due to being extremely smart and suffering from fantasy. He begins to have visions of The Brain as well as other hallucinations. Jim is aided by his girlfriend Janet and best friend Willie when Blake's assistant Verna attempts to take him back to the lab. Willie is killed by The Brain while Jim and Janet do their best to help free the residents of their town from Blake and The Brain's influence. The Brain and Verna brainwash the populace into believing that Jim is a murderer on a rampage; Janet and Jim's parents fall victim to the brainwashing and turn against Jim. Jim returns to Blake's headquarters as the latter plans to broadcast his Independent Thinking to a nationwide audience.

Jim beheads Blake in front of a live audience, revealing that he wasn't human. Jim and Janet are then chased by Verna. The Brain breaks loose and kills Verna before going after Jim and Janet. Cornered, Jim finds a canister of sodium and throws it into The Brain's mouth, blowing it up. Jim resumes a normal life with his parents as he and Janet drive off to school together.

== Cast ==
- David Gale as Dr. Anthony Berol Blake
- Tom Bresnahan as Jim Majelewski
- Cynthia Preston as Janet
- George Buza as Verna
- Brett Pearson as Willie
- Sarah Chapple as Debbie Hodges
- Christine Kossak as Vivian

== Release ==
The Brain was shown in Toronto on November 4, 1988.

== Reception ==
A review for Variety called the film a "cliche-ridden effort, with little comic or ironic relief to put a spin on its sci-fi banalities", adding that its "ambition to comment on the power of TV and gullibility of its viewers vanishes quickly."
