= Ted Grossman (stuntman) =

American actor and stuntman (born 1931)

- Born: April 7, 1931 (age 95); Santa Monica, California, U.S.
- Occupations: Actor, stuntman
- Years active: 1965-2008

Ted Grossman (born April 7, 1931) is an American actor and stuntman. He is best known for serving as a stunt double for Roy Scheider in the 1975 film Jaws.

== Life and career ==
Grossman was born in Santa Monica, California on April 7, 1931. He played American football and basketball at Beverly Hills High School, and played volleyball at the Maccabiah Games. He worked as a police officer, and began his screen career, where he doubled for actors Clark Gable and Alan Ladd.

Later in his career, in 1975, Grossman served as a stunt double for Roy Scheider in the film Jaws. He performed numerous stunts in George Lucas and Steven Spielberg's Indiana Jones film series, and performed stunts in other films such as The Godfather Part II, E.T. the Extra-Terrestrial, The Thief Who Came to Dinner, What's Up, Doc, Compulsion, Conquest of the Planet of the Apes and Magnum Force. He guest-starred in television programs including Starsky & Hutch and Police Story, and played Deputy Morgan Bock in Bernard L. Kowalski's film Sssssss.
