= Bride of Re-Animator =

1991 film by Brian Yuzna

- Theatrical release poster
- Directed by: Brian Yuzna
- Screenplay by: Woody Keith; Rick Fry
- Adapted by: Woody Keith; Rick Fry; Brian Yuzna
- Based on: "Herbert West–Reanimator" by H. P. Lovecraft
- Produced by: Brian Yuzna
- Starring: Jeffrey Combs; Bruce Abbott; Claude Earl Jones; Fabiana Udenio; David Gale; Kathleen Kinmont
- Cinematography: Rick Fichter
- Edited by: Peter Teschner
- Music by: Richard Band
- Production companies: Wild Street Pictures; Re-Animator II Productions
- Distributed by: 50th Street Films
- Release dates: September 8, 1990 (TIFF); February 22, 1991
- Running time: 96 minutes
- Country: United States
- Language: English
- Budget: $2.5 million

Bride of Re-Animator is a 1990 American comedy horror film produced and directed by Brian Yuzna and written by Yuzna, Rick Fry, and Woody Keith. It is a sequel to the 1985 film Re-Animator and the second entry in the Re-Animator film series. Like its predecessor, it is loosely based on the serialized story "Herbert West–Reanimator" (1921-1922) by H. P. Lovecraft. Unlike its predecessor, it was released direct-to-video.

The plot of Bride of Re-Animator roughly follows episodes "V. The Horror from the Shadows" and "VI. The Tomb-Legions" of the Lovecraft story, and follows doctors Herbert West and Dan Cain as they attempt to create a living woman from dead tissue. The film stars Bruce Abbott, Claude Earl Jones, Fabiana Udenio, David Gale, and Kathleen Kinmont, with Jeffrey Combs as Herbert West. It was followed by a sequel, Beyond Re-Animator, released in 2003.

== Plot ==
Eight months after the events of Re-Animator, doctors Herbert West and Dan Cain are working as medics in the middle of a bloody Peruvian civil war. In the chaos of battle and with plenty of casualties to work on, they are free to experiment with West's re-animation reagent. When their medical tent is stormed by the enemy troops, West and Cain return home to Arkham, Massachusetts. There, they resume their former jobs as doctors at Miskatonic University Hospital, and West returns to the basement laboratory of Cain's house to continue his research.

Using parts pilfered from both the hospital's morgue and from a cemetery located next door, West discovers that his reagent can re-animate body parts by themselves. He becomes determined to create an entire living person from disparate body parts. West discovers the heart of Megan Halsey, Cain's fiancée, in the hospital morgue. With the promise to use her heart to re-animate a new Megan, West convinces Cain to help him with his project. Also stored in the morgue is the rest of the evidence from the "Miskatonic Massacre". Inside, pathologist Dr. Wilbur Graves discovers a vial of West's reagent and the severed head of Dr. Carl Hill. Using the reagent, he re-animates Hill's head.

Meanwhile, police officer Lt. Leslie Chapham begins investigating West and Cain, as they were the only unaffected survivors of the Miskatonic Massacre; the dead body of Chapham's wife was re-animated into a crazed zombie during the incident (it is implied later in the film that he caused her death). Chapham suspects West and Cain were responsible. When he stops by their house to question them, he discovers West's corpse-filled lab and the two get into a confrontation. A fight ensues and West kills Chapham by means of cloth treated with a chemical which causes cardiac arrest when inhaled (a product of West's research into obtaining the freshest possible corpses for his experiments). West then re-animates the police officer with the intention of covering up his crime. Chapham violently wanders out of the house and into the cemetery next door.

Hill, who bears a grudge against West, uses psychic powers to command Chapham to force Dr. Graves to stitch bat wings onto his neck, giving him back his mobility. He also extends his mental control to all of the zombie survivors of the Miskatonic Massacre.

When one of Cain's patients, Gloria, dies, West collects the last piece he needs for his creation: her head. With a complete body stitched and wired together, West and Cain inject the re-animation reagent into Meg's heart. While waiting for the reagent to take effect, a package is delivered to their house. West retrieves and opens it. From inside, Hill's winged head flies out. Simultaneously, the zombies Hill controls break into the house. West retreats back to the basement lab, where his creation, the Bride, has awoken.

A catfight breaks out between the Bride and Cain's current girlfriend, Italian journalist Francesca Danelli, whom he met in Peru. Cain rejects the Bride's love and sides with Francesca. Heartbroken, the Bride rips Megan's heart out of her own chest and then falls to pieces. West diagnoses this as tissue rejection.

Hill and his zombies force West, Cain and Francesca to retreat through the wall of the lab and into a crypt in the neighboring cemetery. Inside, all of West's prior test subjects arise and make their way towards him, stopping only when Herbert commands them to. The unstable crypt begins to collapse, trapping Hill, West and the zombies. Cain and Francesca escape the debris and claw their way to the surface of the cemetery together. Hill is stuck in the debris, while Megan's heart, still in the hand of the Bride, stops beating.

== Cast ==
- Jeffrey Combs as Dr. Herbert West
- Bruce Abbott as Dr. Dan Cain
- Claude Earl Jones as Lieutenant Leslie Chapham
- Fabiana Udenio as Francesca Danelli
- David Gale as Dr. Carl Hill
- Kathleen Kinmont as Gloria / The Bride
- Mel Stewart as Dr. Wilbur Graves
- Irene Forrest as Nurse Shelley
- Michael Strasser as Ernest
- Mary Sheldon as Meg Halsey
- Friday as Angel

The Re-Animated

- Marge Turner as Elizabeth Chapham
- Johnny Legend as Skinny Corpse
- David Bynum as Black Corpse
- Noble Craig as Crypt Creature
- Kim Parker as Crypt Creature
- Charles Schneider as Crypt Creature
- Rebeca Recio as Crypt Creature
- Jay Evans as Crypt Creature

== Production ==
In an August 1986 interview, Re-Animator director Stuart Gordon commented, "If we do a sequel to Re-Animator, we'll call it Bride of Re-Animator." He indicated that this title would be in homage to the film Bride of Frankenstein, adding that he already had several ideas for a sequel and that given the title, Meg Halsey would have to be a key character in it. One idea for a sequel involved Dan Cain taking the job of a building superintendent to surreptitiously continue working on Meg Halsey's body at night. When government agents discover his whereabouts, they secret him away to the White House where he is reunited with Herbert West and instructed to reanimate the President of the United States. A similar idea was later used for the unproduced sequel House of Re-Animator.

Pre-production on Bride of Re-Animator began in early 1989. Production on the film was scheduled to begin on June 5, 1989, which left the filmmakers with less than one month to finalize the script, finish hiring the cast and crew, and get the special effects underway. Jeffrey Combs was initially not going to reprise his role as Herbert West due to a scheduling conflict, as he was already booked to be in Italy for the filming of The Pit and the Pendulum. However, on May 25, 1989, production on The Pit and the Pendulum was pushed back, and Combs was immediately cast to return as West.

Director Yuzna considered Patricia Tallman for the role of the Bride, but on May 28, 1989, he selected Kinmont to play the part. Barbara Crampton, who starred in the first Re-Animator film, and had appeared with Kinmont in Fraternity Vacation released in 1985, the same year of the first Re-Animator film, did not return for Bride of Re-Animator. A 1991 issue of Fangoria reported that Crampton declined to reprise her role due to soap opera obligations. In a 2011 interview, Crampton said that her agent convinced her not to make a cameo appearance in Bride of Re-Animator, as he felt that it was beneath her to have such a minor role.

Principal photography began in June 1989 and wrapped the following month, on July 18. A scene in which Dr. Hill's head is found on exhibit at a carnival was shot in mid-June, but this sequence was not included in the finished film.

=== Special effects ===
Tony Doublin of Doublin FX created the special effects for the eye/finger creature, which involved the use of a rod puppet, a stop-motion puppet, and a stunt hand. Doublin also created the puppet used to portray Francesca's dog Angel after West reanimates its corpse and attaches a human arm to it. When not depicted with a puppet, Angel was played by dog actor Friday, who was cast after demonstrating that she could walk with a prosthetic arm. West's failed test subjects were designed by Japanese artist Screaming Mad George and his crew, while the effects for Dr. Hill's head were created by Mike Deak and Wayne Toth of John Carl Buechler's Magical Media Industries.

The special effects for the Bride were created by KNB EFX Group, including Robert Kurtzman and Howard Berger. Greg Nicotero, who co-founded KNB EFX with Kurtzman and Berger, was working on the special effects for another film, Halloween 5: The Revenge of Michael Myers, during the pre-production of Bride of Re-Animator. However, Nicotero joined the Bride of Re-Animator crew in June 1989, and oversaw the effects during the filming of the sequence in which West and Cain are shown working as wartime medics in a field hospital.

== Reception ==
On the review aggregator website Rotten Tomatoes, the film holds an approval rating of 57% based on 46 critics. The consensus summarizes: "Jeffrey Combs' Herbert West remains a wickedly devious presence, but Bride of Re-Animator can't revive the original's anarchically inventive spark, making it a fitfully entertaining but greatly diminished sequel." Variety recommended it to fans of the first film, but noted that the abundance of gore "will turn off" mainstream audiences. Vincent Canby of The New York Times wrote that "Bride of Re-Animator is less a sequel to the critically praised 1985 horror film Re-Animator than a rehash based on the same H. P. Lovecraft stories." Ty Burr of Entertainment Weekly gave it a rating of "C+" and called it "an anemic shadow of the first film".

James Lowder reviewed Bride of Re-Animator in White Wolf Inphobia #55 (May, 1995), rating it a 1 1/2 out of 5 and stated that "At one point Dan Cain calls West's experiments 'morbid doodling with human body parts.' That's actually a fair summary of the entire film."

Patrick Legare of AllMovie gave the film 2 out of 5 stars, writing that "Re-Animator was a tough act to follow, but Brian Yuzna does an admirable job of keeping with the splattery spirit of the original". In their book Lurker in the Lobby: A Guide to the Cinema of H. P. Lovecraft, Andrew Migliore and John Strysik write: "Bride of Re-Animator is a silly film that is fun solely for the fevered performance of Jeffrey Combs. Unlike the original Re-Animator, Bride's script really suffers from a lack of cohesiveness and undeterminable character motivation." Writing in The Zombie Movie Encyclopedia, academic Peter Dendle called it "a pointless and forgettable sequel". Bruce G. Hallenbeck, in his book Comedy-Horror Films: A Chronological History, 1914-2008, criticized the discontinuity from the first film (in particular that Herbert West is alive and Megan Halsey is dead at the beginning, when it was the other way around at the end of Re-Animator) and said Yuzna's direction pales against Re-Animator director Stuart Gordon's, but concluded Bride of Re-Animator to be a very respectable sequel which "lacks the wit and originality of the first movie but goes even farther into the gruesome concept of re-animation." He particularly praised the bizarre zombie designs and the performance of Jeffrey Combs, which he described as superior to Combs's already great work in the original.

Bride of Re-Animator was nominated for two awards by the Academy of Science Fiction, Fantasy & Horror Films in 1991. It was nominated for the Saturn Award for Best Horror Film and Jeffrey Combs was nominated for Saturn Award for Best Supporting Actor.

== Sequel ==
Bride of Re-Animator was followed by Beyond Re-Animator in 2003.
