= Savage Weekend =

- Theatrical poster
- Directed by: David Paulsen
- Written by: David Paulsen
- Produced by: Alvin L. Fast
- Starring: Christopher Allport; James Doerr; Marilyn Hamlin; Caitlin O'Heaney; David Gale; Devin Goldenberg; Jeffrey Pomerantz; William Sanderson
- Cinematography: Zoltan Vidor
- Edited by: Zion Avrahamian; Jonathan Day
- Music by: Dov Seltzer
- Production company: Upstate Murder Co.
- Distributed by: Cannon Films
- Release dates: September 21, 1979 (United Kingdom); November 14, 1980 (United States)
- Running time: 88 minutes
- Country: United States
- Language: English
- Budget: $58,000

Savage Weekend is a 1979 American slasher film directed by David Paulsen and starring Christopher Allport, David Gale, William Sanderson, and Caitlin O'Heaney. The film follows a woman who retreats to upstate New York with her wealthy boyfriend, her sister, and friend, only to be stalked by a killer in a disfigured mask.

Filmed in 1976 under the working title The Upstate Murders, and initially marketed as The Killer Behind the Mask, the film was acquired by Cannon Films and released theatrically in North America in late 1979. It has been cited as an early prototype for the slasher film, predating both Halloween (1978) and Friday the 13th (1980).

== Plot ==
Marie Pettis has recently divorced her politician husband Greg, who was involved in a widely-publicized political scandal in New York City. To decompress, she leaves for a weekend trip in upstate New York with her new stockbroker boyfriend Robert, her sister Shirley, and their openly gay friend Nicky. They arrive to the country late in the evening, and stop in a small town. Robert, Marie, and Shirley pick up groceries at a market, where Shirley finds a sinister face mask that she decides to buy as a joke. Meanwhile, Nicky goes to the bar across the street for a drink, and is harassed by two homophobic men whom he beats up.

They arrive at the remote farmhouse Robert has recently purchased from Otis, a local man whose father has died, and whom Robert has hired to build a large schooner, a project which is being housed in a barn on the property. Jay Alsop, an engineer and friend of Robert's, arrives to oversee the boat's progress. Mac Macauley, a lumberman providing the wood for the boat, tells Marie of a local rumor involving a young woman who was assaulted by the unhinged Otis, and hints that he may have been responsible for a murder.

Jay quickly develops a sexual interest in Shirley. Meanwhile, Marie finds herself attracted to Mac. The following afternoon, Jay goes down to the barn to check on Otis's progress on the boat; there, he is strangled by a killer donning the mask Shirley bought the day before, and his body is hung from the rafters so as to appear as a suicide. That night, the rest of the group dresses up for a formal dinner at the house. After dinner, Marie and Robert go for a walk on the property, and discover Jay's body hanging in the barn. Horrified, they rush back to the house.

Meanwhile, an inebriated Shirley puts on a tango record and performs a striptease for Nicky. The two playfully dance together on the house's second floor, and apply makeup to each other's faces. The killer attacks Nicky upstairs, stabbing him through the head with a large sewing needle. Shirley is chased into the basement, where the killer ties her to a table saw and attempts to kill her with it, but cannot get power to the tool. Robert and Marie reach the house, and are confronted by the killer. Robert discovers Nicky's body upstairs, and is thrown to his death out of the second story window. The killer then returns to the ground floor, where he reveals himself to be Greg. He tells Marie that he plans on taking her out into the lake and committing a murder–suicide.

The next morning, Mac arrives at the house, and finds it empty. As he goes to investigate the basement, he turns on a light switch which activates the table saw, inadvertently killing Shirley, who has been tied to the table all night. Mac flees the house, where he encounters Greg attempting to bring Marie to the lake to kill her. Greg and Mac begin fighting and tackle one another to the ground. Otis arrives upon the scene, and kills Greg with a chainsaw.

== Cast ==
- Christopher Allport as Nicky
- James Doerr as Robert Fathwood
- David Gale as Mac Macauley
- Devin Goldenberg as Jay Alsop
- Marilyn Hamlin as Marie Sales Pettis
- Caitlin O'Heaney as Shirley Sales
- Jeffrey Pomerantz as Greg Pettis
- William Sanderson as Otis
- Yancy Butler as Little Girl
- Adam Hirsch as Jeremy Pettis
- Don Plumley as Pool Player
- Ben Simon as Lumberman
- Geraldine Chapin as Woman at Bar
- Rae Chapin as Lumberman
- Claude Dickison as Waitress at Bar
- Robert T. Henderson as Bartende

== Production ==
=== Screenplay ===
Savage Weekend was written and directed by David Paulsen, in his directorial debut. The project originated after an investor who had agreed to fund a different film for Paulsen retracted the majority of the money he had promised, instead allotting $20,000. With such a small budget in mind, Paulsen wrote an original screenplay for a horror film that could be made with few resources. The screenplay was completed while Paulsen was staying in East Hampton, New York over a period of two weeks. Paulsen stated that he fashioned the script around a variety of bizarre and extravagant murder sequences.

=== Filming ===
Savage Weekend was shot in the Hudson River Valley on a remote lake location over a period of around three weeks. In addition to the initial $20,000 invested in the project, Paulsen was able to accrue an additional $38,000, resulting in a final budget of $58,000. Paulsen described the shoot as "hellish," and filming of exterior sequences was often impeded by clouds, which affected the outdoor lighting.

Actress Caitlin O'Heaney, then a recent graduate of Juilliard, had been a stage actress in New York, and had recently performed on Broadway with Katharine Hepburn at the time of being cast. O'Heaney auditioned for the part at the suggestion of her agent, and claimed she took the role in order to establish herself within the Screen Actors Guild. She described the shoot as "low budget, but very professional," and cited the experience as essential at informing her film acting.

== Release ==
Savage Weekend was screened out of competition at the 1978 Cannes Film Festival as part of the Marché du Film. According to Paulsen, the photo laboratory had failed to reframe the aspect ratio, and he was "horrified" to see that boom mics were visible in the cut. During the Cannes screening, Paulsen and his wife manually covered the top and bottom edges of the frame with tape to achieve the intended aspect ratio for the screening. The film was picked up for release by The Cannon Group in 1979 under the title The Killer Behind The Mask.

In the United Kingdom, the film opened on September 21, 1979, screening as a double feature with Terror (1978). It received an X rating from the British Board of Film Classification. It also screened at drive-in theaters in Scotland in November 1979.

The film opened in the United States on November 14, 1980, Detroit and in Windsor, Ontario, Canada. The film expanded to Philadelphia on November 28. Though Paulsen stated that the studio had assured him the aspect ratio would be fixed for their theatrical distribution, the studio failed to correct it, resulting in boom mics remaining visible in the frame.

=== Home media ===
The film was released on VHS in the 1980s by various companies, including Paragon Video Productions. The film is available on DVD through various companies, but the legality of these releases in terms of proper licensing is in question. The film's public domain status is in question, but it seems to have no notice affixed to it or registration. Due to its public domain status, various independent companies released the film on DVD, often in low quality prints sourced from video transfers.

In July 2015, it was announced that the film was being released on Blu-ray through joint licensing by Kino Lorber and 20th Century Fox, featuring an HD transfer from the original source material. It was released September 29, 2015, and features a restored print of the film from the original source material.

== Reception ==
TV Guide called it "A truly reprehensible exploitation film... Ultra-low-budget and shot on grainy color stock, the film is borderline pornography, and the gore effects are extremely gruesome." Candice Russell, film and theatre writer for the Fort Lauderdale News described the film as "strictly for wackos" and that "sickness bags should be given with the price of admission".

Ed Blank, writing for The Pittsburgh Press, lambasted the film as "incoherent, illiterate and inept," also criticizing it for being "sexist in the extreme," featuring female characters who "serve no other purpose other than to appear in various stages of undress and back up against walls and trees so they can be slain or tied up." Philadelphia Daily News critic Joe Baltake criticized the film's portrayal of Nicky, the gay character, writing: "He's the foulest movie character of recent memory, enough to set gay rights activism back several decades... It's still not clear to me whether [director] Paulsen wanted to make a soft-core porno film, a horror movie or a combination of both. It's not clear because he's failed at all three."

In spite of this, the film has attained a cult following and been cited as a proto-slasher film.

== Sources ==
- Edwards, Matthew (2017). Twisted Visions: Interviews with Cult Horror Filmmakers. Jefferson, North Carolina: McFarland. ISBN 978-1-476-66376-0.
- Harper, Jim (2004). Legacy of Blood: A Comprehensive Guide to Slasher Movies. Manchester: Critical Vision. ISBN 978-1-900-48639-2.
- Muir, John Kenneth (2007). Horror Films of the 1970s. Jefferson, North Carolina: McFarland. ISBN 978-0-786-43104-5.
