= Sssssss =

1973 film by Bernard L. Kowalski

- Theatrical release poster
- Directed by: Bernard L. Kowalski
- Screenplay by: Hal Dresner
- Story by: Daniel C. Striepeke
- Produced by: Daniel C. Striepeke
- Starring: Strother Martin; Dirk Benedict; Heather Menzies
- Cinematography: Gerald Perry Finnerman
- Edited by: Robert Watts
- Music by: Patrick Williams
- Production company: The Zanuck/Brown Company
- Distributed by: Universal Pictures
- Release date: July 18, 1973
- Running time: 99 minutes
- Country: United States
- Language: English
- Budget: $1 million
- Box office: $1 million (US/Canada rentals)

Sssssss (Note: The film was released as Ssssnake in the United Kingdom and as Mysterious! The Vampire Human Snake in Japan.) is a 1973 American body horror film directed by Bernard L. Kowalski and starring Strother Martin, Dirk Benedict, and Heather Menzies. Its plot follows a college student who becomes a laboratory assistant to a herpetologist who is covertly developing a serum that can transform human beings into snakes.

The make-up effects were created by John Chambers and Nick Marcellino. It received a nomination for the Best Science Fiction Film award of the Academy of Science Fiction, Fantasy and Horror Films in 1975.

== Plot ==
Dr. Carl Stoner, a herpetologist, sells a mysterious creature in a crate to a carnival owner. He hires college student David Blake as an assistant, claiming that his previous assistant had left town to attend to a sick relative. Unbeknownst to David or anyone else, Stoner is a delusional man.

Stoner begins David on a course of injections, purportedly as a safeguard against being bitten by a snake in his lab. David's skin slowly starts to change and even peel like a snakeskin. He begins to have strange nightmares and goes into a coma when having dinner with Stoner, not waking up until a few days later. He also begins to lose weight, but Stoner tells him those are side effects from the venom. David begins a romance with Stoner's daughter Kristina. Her father objects and insists that she not have any sexual relations with him, not knowing that she already has.

When David wakes up the next morning, he has become green and covered with scales. Stoner takes him to the lab and gives him another injection. Stoner's colleague, Dr. Daniels, arrives to inform him that he has been denied an extension of his research grant. Stoner reacts to the news with indifference. Made suspicious by this, Daniels inspects the property. Stoner hides David in a corner, but David gets enough strength to walk to a window, allowing Daniels to see him. Stoner knocks Daniels out and feeds him to a python, and David collapses.

Kristina visits a carnival freak show and sees a limbless "snake-man", whom she recognizes as Stoner's previous assistant. Horrified, she races back home to save David, who completely mutates into a king cobra, brought about by Stoner's injections. Deeming his work a success, Stoner provokes another king cobra from his lab into biting him and dies. Kristina arrives home and finds her father's body with the cobra next to him. Growing suspicious, the police arrive and shoot the cobra before heading to the lab where a mongoose is biting David's neck, attempting to kill him. As Kristina screams David's name, the movie ends, leaving their fates uncertain.

== Cast ==
- Strother Martin as Dr. Carl Stoner
- Dirk Benedict as David Blake
- Heather Menzies as Kristina Stoner
- Richard B. Shull as Dr. Ken Daniels
- Tim O'Connor as Kogen
- Jack Ging as Sheriff Dale Hardison
- Kathleen King as Kitty Stewart
- Reb Brown as Steve Randall
- Ted Grossman as Deputy Morgan Bock
- Charles Seel as Old Man / Oh Il-nam
- Ray Ballard as Waggish Tourist
- Noble Craig as Tim McGraw, The Snake Man

== Production ==
The film's executive producers were Richard Zanuck and David Brown, who went on to produce Jaws.

=== Filming ===
Principal photography of Sssssss took place between November 13, 1972, through early December 1972.

== Release ==
Sssssss was released theatrically in Los Angeles on July 18, 1973.

=== Home media ===
Sssssss remained unreleased on home video in the United States until 1997, when it was issued by MCA Universal. It also received VHS releases in Japan and Spain by CIC Video, under the titles Ssssnake and Sssilbido de Muerte, respectively.

The film made its DVD debut on September 7, 2004, via Universal, who would re-release the film three additional times in 2009, 2011 and 2014. The 2011 release was part of a four-film "Cult Horror Collection", with The Funhouse, Phantasm II and The Serpent and the Rainbow. A DVD was also released in Japan on 7 April 2010.

Sssssss received its first Blu-ray release on April 26, 2016, through Scream Factory, which included new interviews with stars Dirk Benedict and Heather Menzies as bonus features. It also received a Blu-ray release in Australia on 1 February 2017, via Shock Entertainment.

== Reception ==
=== Box office ===
Sssssss earned $1 million in rentals at the United States box office.

=== Critical response ===
Howard Thompson of The New York Times called the film "a ss-surprise. Were it not for the lurid, starkly flapping windup, this would be recommended in toto as a gripping, quietly imaginative hair-curler. It is the only movie fiction I have ever seen that sustains a scholarly, informative attitude toward the world of snakes. This aspect is fascinating and chilling, as a gentle old venom researcher, Strother Martin, putters around with cobras and pythons in a country lab." Gene Siskel of the Chicago Tribune gave the film 1.5 stars out of 4, writing, "Even after 40 years of improved film technology, the climactic scene in Sssssss fails to match the drama of that moment when Frankenstein's monster sits up on the table." Kevin Thomas of the Los Angeles Times called it "highly amusing and genuinely creepy," and praised the "spectacular makeup." Keith Alain of The Monthly Film Bulletin wrote that an "attractive streak of humour suggests in the early stages that Ssssnake may turn into a macabre little thriller on the lines of The Fly," and lamented that "parody is eventually jettisoned in favour of portentous horror ... The rather disparate and ludicrous plot is not made any smoother by Bernard L. Kowalski's direction, which manages to be lumberingly predictable even in its borrowings (the Freaks-ish sideshow sequences, for example)." Leonard Maltin gave the film three out of a possible four stars, praising the film's "exceptional" make-up effects.

On Rotten Tomatoes, the film has an approval rating of 36% based on 11 reviews with an average rating of 4.1/10.

=== Accolades ===
Year	Award / Film Festival	Category	Recipient(s)	Result
1974	3rd Paris International Festival of Fantastic and Science-Fiction Film	Best Special Effects	John Chambers, Nick Marcellino	Won

== See also ==
- List of American films of 1973
- List of killer snake films
- Tusk

== Sources ==
- Maltin, Leonard; Sader, Luke; Carson, Darwyn; Edelman, Rob (2013). Leonard Maltin's 2014 Movie Guide. New York City, New York: Penguin Books. ISBN 978-0-451-41810-4.
- Weaver, Tom (2006). Interviews with B Science Fiction and Horror Movie Makers: Writers, Producers, Directors, Actors, Moguls and Makeup. Jefferson, North Carolina: McFarland. ISBN 978-0-786-42858-8.
