= Out of Time (1988 film) =

1988 film by Robert Butler

- Directed by: Robert Butler
- Starring: Bruce Abbott; Bill Maher; Rebecca Schaeffer
- Music by: Andy Summers
- Country of origin: United States
- Original language: English

Production
- Production companies: Out Of Time Productions Inc. Columbia Pictures Television

Original release
- Release: July 17, 1988

Out of Time is a 1988 science fiction film directed by Robert Butler and starring Bruce Abbott and Bill Maher. It was a failed television pilot made into a television movie.

== Plot ==
Channing Taylor is a cop from the year 2088. He is transported back to 1988 while pursuing a criminal attempting to flee in a time machine, and enlists the aid of his legendary great-grandfather in pursuing the crook. However, he finds that his grandfather is not yet the great cop hero/inventor who is revered in the future. Taylor must catch the criminal and help shape his grandfather into the man history recorded.

== Cast ==
- Bruce Abbott as Channing Taylor
- Bill Maher as Maxwell Taylor
- Rebecca Schaeffer as Pam Wallace
- Kristian Alfonso as Cassandra Barber
- Leo Rossi as Ed Hawkins
- Ray Girardin as Capt. Krones
- Adam Ant as Richard Marcus
- Arva Holt as Capt. Stuart
- Tom La Grua as Frank
- Barbara Tarbuck as Dr. Kerry Langdon

== Sources ==
- TV Guide magazine
- Article from Lansing State Journal newspaper of July 14, 1988.
