= Call of Cthulhu: The Wasted Land =

2012 video game

- Developer: Red Wasp Design
- Publisher: Red Wasp Design
- Platforms: iOS, Microsoft Windows, Android
- Release: iOS: WW: January 30, 2012; Microsoft Windows: WW: May 5, 2012; Android: WW: July 6, 2013
- Genre: Tactical role-playing
- Mode: Single-player

Call of Cthulhu: The Wasted Land is a Lovecraftian horror tactical role-playing game developed by British studio Red Wasp Design in conjunction with Chaosium. The game was released in 2012, for iOS in January, for PC in May, and for Android in June.

The Wasted Land is based on the works of H. P. Lovecraft, author of The Call of Cthulhu and progenitor of the Cthulhu Mythos. It bases some of its narrative on Lovecraft's novella Herbert West–Reanimator, and also contains elements from the Call of Cthulhu role-playing game. The game is set during World War I and pits a group of soldiers and investigators against a conspiracy within the German army to build an army of re-animated corpses from the dead of the conflict.

== Gameplay ==
The game is a mixture of a turn-based strategy and a role-playing game. The developer explained the mix of gameplay, and the development process, as follows: "When we started out, we were aiming for something in the style of Fire Emblem or Advance Wars, but it's evolved into something more like X-Com as we've gone on. The closest parallel is probably with an old PC game called Incubation, which was more storyline-based than X-Com." In keeping with its influences, the game uses an action point system combined with aspects of the stats system from the paper version of Call of Cthulhu.

== Plot ==
In 1915, Professor Brightmeer is called by a shady part of Britain's secret service MI-47, to go to France then in the midst of the Great War; he joins a British Army officer, Captain Hill in tracking down a secret cult while the war rages about them. The cult, headed by a mysterious figure called Docktor Kaul is using the stolen technology of Herbert West (the re-animator) combined with arcane mythos magic to build an undead army from the victims of the war.

The Captain and the Professor track Kaul across the trench lines, fighting German soldiers, the undead, and the Cthulhu Mythos monsters, including the Dark Young and hybrid Star Spawn of Cthulhu. They eventually track Kaul to his underground lab where he has built a machine to generate monsters for Germany, also to power a ritual to summon a full Star Spawn. A larger plot is revealed as the cult seeks to eliminate humanity from Earth to clear it for a new hybrid species of part human, part Star Spawn. The ritual goes forward, and the Star Spawn appears. The player is victorious if the Star Spawn is defeated.

== Development ==
The development of the game was influenced heavily by both Lovecraft's original writings and the Call of Cthulhu RPG. The game's designer, Tomas Rawlings, commented in an interview: "What lifted Lovecraft's work above much of that written by his contemporaries was that he managed to tap into the very human desire we have to explore our own mortality. [...] I had talked to Chaosium about doing something in video games on a number of occasions but it never seemed to happen for one reason or another. Then, the stars aligned last year, and I found myself in a position to do a mobile adaptation of Call of Cthulhu." The game took around a year to develop, though it was initially announced on 10 May 2011, with SD screenshots then HD screenshots later released.

== Reception ==
Reception

Aggregate score
Aggregator	Score
Metacritic	iOS: 68/100

The game has been generally well received. For example, The Guardian recommended it as a download and T3 Magazine called it "stunningly complex turn-by-turn strategy-based SIM redefines expectations for the iPad as games platform." However, some reviews expressed concern at the control sensitivity, a point the developers claim they addressed in an update. The ongoing cultural influence of H.P.Lovecraft as embodied in this game (and others) was underscored by Wired's GeekDad decision to release the review to coincide with the 75th anniversary of his death; "And I cannot think of a better way to celebrate his death — it is Lovecraft after all — than losing your mind playing Call of Cthulhu: The Wasted Land." ComboCaster gave the game 6.8 out of 10, praising the setting and Lovecraft inspiration
