= Zombie Tsunami =

2012 mobile game

- Developer: Mobigame
- Publisher: Mobigame
- Platforms: Android, iOS, Windows 10 Mobile
- Release: May 31, 2012
- Genre: Side scrolling endless runner
- Mode: Single-player

Zombie Tsunami, formerly known as Zombie Carnaval is a side scrolling endless runner game. It was developed by French studio Mobigame and released for Android and iOS on May 31, 2012, and Windows 10 Mobile in 2015. It was renamed to Zombie Tsunami on August 11, 2012, to avoid a trademark conflict with Taito's Zombie Carnival mobile game.

== Gameplay ==
Zombie Tsunami is an endless runner, and the gameplay is typical of games of this genre. The player controls a zombie who must collect coins, eat people encountered on the street or in transport, and avoid various obstacles and traps. When a character eats a person, he turns into a zombie. Thus, the player gathers a horde to make his task easier: even if one zombie gets caught in a trap or falls, the rest will continue to run. Control is carried out by clicking on the screen, and the height of the jump depends on the length of the click. The game has a task system, completing which the player will receive additional rewards in the form of game currency.

For coins that are collected during the game, received for completing tasks or purchased for real money, the player can buy various power-ups and decorative elements. Rewards can also be obtained in the lottery, tickets for which are given for collecting brains (brains are given for each person eaten).

== Reception ==
The game has a Metacritic score of 85% based on 8 critic reviews.
