= The Haunting in Connecticut =

2009 film

- Theatrical release poster
- Directed by: Peter Cornwell
- Written by: Adam Simon; Tim Metcalfe
- Produced by: Paul Brooks; Andrew Trapani; Daniel Farrands; Wendy Rhoads
- Starring: Virginia Madsen; Kyle Gallner; Martin Donovan; Amanda Crew; Elias Koteas
- Cinematography: Adam Swica
- Edited by: Tom Elkins
- Music by: Robert J. Kral
- Production companies: Gold Circle Films; Integrated Films
- Distributed by: Lionsgate (United States); Maple Pictures (Canada)
- Release dates: March 17, 2009 (South by Southwest); March 27, 2009 (United States)
- Running time: 92 minutes (Note: The film's theatrical cut in the United States runs 92 minutes. An extended 102-minute cut of the film was released in British cinemas, and later made available on DVD and Blu-ray in North America.)
- Countries: United States; Canada
- Language: English
- Box office: $78.8 million

The Haunting in Connecticut is a 2009 supernatural horror film directed by Peter Cornwell in his feature directorial debut, and starring Virginia Madsen, Kyle Gallner, Martin Donovan, Amanda Crew, and Elias Koteas. The film follows a family who, to help mitigate the strains of travel on their cancer-stricken son, move into a former funeral home with a dark history. It is based on the alleged supernatural experiences of Carmen Snedeker and her family while residing in a former funeral home in Southington, Connecticut in the late 1980s. The Snedeker family's experiences were documented by writer Ray Garton in In a Dark Place: The Story of a True Haunting (1992), though Garton later publicly distanced himself from the accuracy of the events he depicted in the book.

Development of The Haunting in Connecticut began in 2007 through Gold Circle Films, with John Carpenter originally attached as director, though Carpenter eventually backed out of the project due to creative differences, with Cornwell serving as his replacement. Principal photography took place in Teulon, Manitoba in late 2007.

The Haunting in Connecticut had its world premiere at South by Southwest in Austin, Texas on March 17, 2009, before being theatrically released in the United States and Canada the following week. The film grossed approximately $78.8 million internationally. Critical reaction to the film was largely unfavorable, though it did receive some praise for its atmosphere, visual elements, and performances. (Note: Attributed to multiple critical reviews.)

In 2010, Gold Circle Films announced the production of an indirect sequel, The Haunting in Connecticut 2: Ghosts of Georgia, which was released in 2013.

== Plot ==
In 1987, Sara Campbell is driving her son Matt home from a Connecticut hospital where he has been undergoing experimental cancer treatments. Sara and her husband, Peter, a recovering alcoholic, discuss finding a rental house closer to the hospital. On another hospital visit, Sara finds a man putting up a "For Rent" sign in front of a large house. The man is frustrated and offers her the first month free if she rents the house immediately.

The following day, Peter arrives with Matt's brother Billy and cousins Wendy and Mary, and they choose rooms. Matt chooses the basement, which is divided by a partition wall with a locked door. After moving in, Matt suffers a series of visions involving an old, bearded man and corpses with symbols carved into their skin. The next day, Peter learns that the house was originally a funeral home; the room behind the mysterious door in the basement is a mortuary.

Matt tells another cancer patient, Reverend Nicholas Popescu, about his visions. Nicholas advises him to find out what the spirit wants. Later, Matt encounters a burned figure in his room who begins to move toward him. When the family comes home, they find a shirtless Matt with his fingers bleeding from scratching at the wall.

The family begins to disintegrate under the stress of Matt's illness and bizarre behavior. The children find a box of photographs, which show Jonah, a young man from Matt's visions, at a séance, emitting ectoplasm from his mouth. They also find a container of desiccated human eyelids. Wendy and Matt discover that the funeral home was run by a man named Ramsey Aickman, who conducted psychic research and would host séances with Jonah acting as a medium. At one séance, all those attending, including Aickman, were found dead, and Jonah disappeared.

Nicholas theorizes that Aickman was practicing necromancy in an attempt to control the dead and bind them to the house. That night, Nicholas finds human remains in the house and removes them. Matt awakens to find Aickman's symbols carved into his skin. He is taken to the hospital, where he encounters Jonah's ghost. Nicholas and Matt begin to have simultaneous visions revealing Jonah's fate: During the séance, a demonic presence burnt all the attendees in a flash of light. Jonah fled, using a dumbwaiter to escape the basement, but inadvertently became trapped in the crematory, where he was cremated alive.

Peter and Sara learn that Matt's cancer treatments have had no effect. They then discover that Matt has escaped the hospital. At home, Nicholas leaves a message telling the family to get out immediately, as it was Jonah's spirit that protected them. Matt breaks through the walls in the front room with an axe, revealing the dusty corpses Aickman hid in the walls. He forces Wendy and the children outside before barricading himself in the house and tearing down the other walls as corpses begin to tumble into the room. Jonah seemingly possesses Matt, who lights the bodies and the room on fire. Later on, investigators arrive at the house only to find it engulfed in flames.

As the fire department arrives, Sara and Peter frantically try to get in to save Matt. The spirits, finally freed, disappear. Outside, everyone watches tearfully as the emergency crew attempts to revive a dying Matt. As Matt slips away, he experiences a vision of himself standing in the graveyard where he sees Jonah, no longer appearing burnt. He seems about to follow Jonah when he hears his mother's voice. Matt returns to his body, and Jonah's spirit leaves him.

An intertitle reveals that after the events, Matt's cancer miraculously disappeared. The house was rebuilt and resold with no further reported incidents of haunting.

== Cast ==
- Virginia Madsen as Sara Campbell
- Kyle Gallner as Matt Campbell
- Elias Koteas as Reverend Nicholas Popescu
- Amanda Crew as Wendy
- Martin Donovan as Peter Campbell
- Ty Wood as Billy Campbell
- Sophi Knight as Mary
- D. W. Brown as Dr. Brooks
- Erik Berg as Jonah
- John Bluethner as Ramsey Aickman
- John B. Lowe as Mr. Sinclair

== Production ==
=== Development ===
The origins of The Haunting in Connecticut date back to 2003, when screenwriter and producer Daniel Farrands presented the story to producer Andrew Trapani. The film's screenplay, by Adam Simon and Tim Metcalfe, is based on the alleged supernatural experiences of Carmen Snedeker and her family, who moved into a former Southington, Connecticut funeral home during her son Stephen's cancer treatments in 1986. The Snedekers' experiences were documented in the 1992 book In a Dark Place: The Story of a True Haunting by Ray Garton. Carmen Snedeker provided input to the screenwriters over the course of approximately two years while the screenplay was being drafted.

In early 2007, Gold Circle Films was reportedly discussing a directing contract with John Carpenter for The Haunting in Connecticut. Although Carpenter was initially interested, the deal quickly fell through due to creative differences. Carpenter did enjoy the film's concept and would later agree to direct The Ward due to its similarities in tone and theme with The Haunting in Connecticut.

=== Casting ===
Virginia Madsen was cast in the film in May 2007 as Sara Campbell, the matriarch of the family. According to producer Paul Brooks, Madsen was the first actress sought for the role. "Virginia had a great combination of warmth and authority," said director Cornwell, "and she really helped to sell the reality of the family’s experience."

Madsen stated that she had been interested in making a horror film, and had recently read "about 25 scripts" that she felt gave her "nothing to do." When the role was offered to her, Madsen responded positively to the screenplay and its elements of interpersonal family drama. Commenting on her portrayal of a real person, Madsen said: "I think something life-changing happened to that family. I don't know how much of what happened would meet my definition of real. I don't know what happened to them—and I don't even know how much I believe. Then, of course, we took a little Hollywood license. In the end, I can only play what's in the script."

In September 2007, The Hollywood Reporter announced the casting of Kyle Gallner, Martin Donovan, and Elias Koteas. The film reunited Madsen and Koteas, who had previously been co-stars in the horror film The Prophecy (1995).

=== Filming ===
Principal photography began on September 10, 2007, in Teulon and Winnipeg, Manitoba Canada, and was completed after approximately two months. The majority of filming took place in a historic 101-year-old home in Teulon.

The film features several historical photographs from the archives of Thomas Glendenning Hamilton, a Canadian spiritualist who photographed numerous séances, depicting alleged incidents of ectoplasm and other supernatural phenomena.

== Factual basis ==
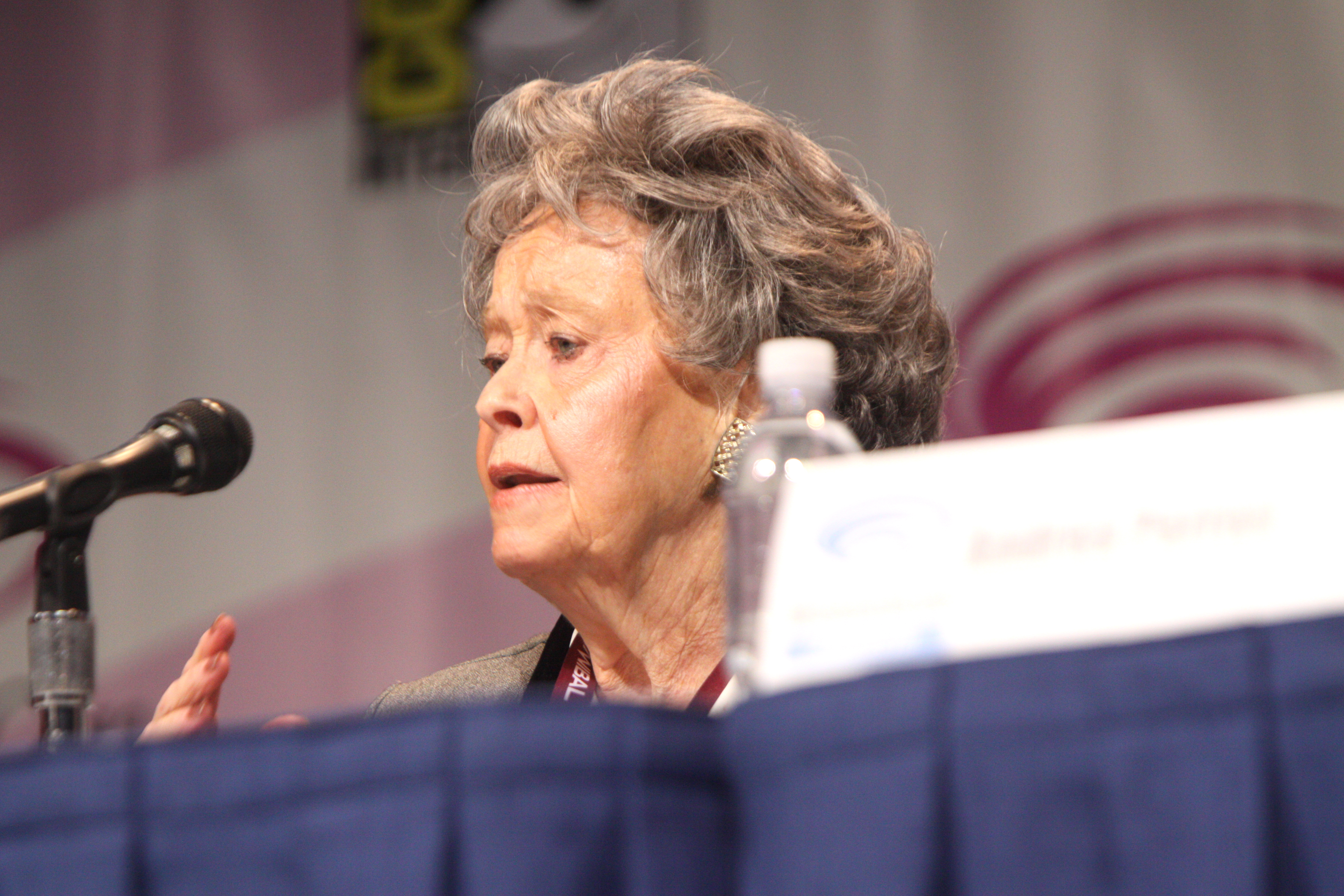
Lorraine Warren, who investigated the alleged haunting depicted in the film, indicated the film was "very loosely based" on the actual investigation

Promotional material for the film claimed that it was "based on true events" experienced by the Snedeker family of Southington, Connecticut, in 1986. Paranormal investigators Ed and Lorraine Warren claimed that the Snedeker house was a former funeral home where morticians regularly practiced necromancy and engaged in necrophilia, and that there were "powerful" supernatural "forces at work" that were cured by an exorcism. Carmen Snedeker's claims of haunting by an "evil entity" and subsequent exorcism were dramatized in episodes of the television series A Haunting (2002), Paranormal Witness (2012), and Mysteries at the Museum (2014).

However, according to skeptical investigator Benjamin Radford, there is "little or no proof that anything supernatural occurred at the house." Radford wrote that author Ray Garton was employed by the Warrens to write the supposedly "true story" and was instructed by Ed Warren, "You've got some of the story — just use what works and make the rest up… Just make it up and make it scary."

Researcher Joe Nickell has dismissed the story as a hoax, and claimed that the Snedekers' landlady "found the whole story ridiculous," adding that no residents before or since had experienced anything unusual in the home. The landlady also noted that, despite their claims of paranormal activity, the Snedekers continued to reside in the home for over two years before deciding to leave. Nickell noted that since Ed Warren died in 2006, some of his coauthors have admitted he "told them to make up incidents and details to create scary stories." In an interview prior to the film's release, Lorraine Warren commented:

The movie is very, very loosely based on the actual investigation... It was back in the '80s. We were called, it was very late at night, that Ed and I were called by a woman and her niece who were living with her at the time... The boys were the first to start talking about things they had seen and experienced, saying they were terrified. The parents were kind of chastising the kids—they thought it was all crazy. But the kids were so scared they started sleeping on the floor in the living room. It finally got to the point where we contacted the bishop’s office in Hartford. Thank God he was very open to our work and what was going on. He sent two priests to the house and both of these priests were very high in the church. One had been used as an exorcist. They came to the house and said mass.

== Release ==
In October 2008, MTV released the film's first official theatrical trailer. The film was originally planned for a June 19, 2009 theatrical release, but in February 2009, its distributor, Lionsgate, announced that the release had been moved to March of that year.

The Haunting in Connecticut premiered at South by Southwest in Austin, Texas on March 17, 2009. It was theatrically released in the United States and Canada ten days later, on March 27, 2009. Lionsgate handled distribution in the United States, while in Canada, the film was distributed by Maple Pictures. Due to favorable test screenings, Lionsgate increased the film's U.S. release platform from approximately 2,200 screens to over 2,700.

The owners of the actual Southington, Connecticut home depicted in the film reported that the film's publicity had resulted in numerous individuals visiting and photographing the residence in the weeks leading up to its release.

=== Home media ===
The Haunting in Connecticut was released on DVD and Blu-ray on July 14, 2009, featuring an extended 102-minute cut of the film. It debuted in the number one position on the DVD and Blu-ray charts with 1.5 million units sold. Rentrak reported that the DVD release of The Haunting in Connecticut was no. 1 in DVD sales for the week ending July 19, 2009.

The extended version DVD includes a commentary with director Peter Cornwell, co-writer Adam Simon, producer Andrew Trapani, and editor Tom Elkins, a second commentary with the director and actors Virginia Madsen and Kyle Gallner, deleted scenes with optional director commentary, featurettes ("Two Dead Boys: Making of The Haunting in Connecticut", "The Fear is Real: Re-Investigating the Haunting", "Memento Mori: The History of Post Mortem Photography", "Anatomy of a Haunting"), and a digital copy of the film on a second disc.

The DVD material was produced and directed by Daniel Farrands, who also served as a producer on the film. "Anatomy of a Haunting" featured commentary by parapsychological researchers Dr. Barry E. Taff and Jack Rourke. The DVD and Blu-ray release of The Haunting in Connecticut was the recipient of the Best Ghost Story award in Home Media Magazine's 2009 Reaper Awards ceremony held in Los Angeles in October 2009.

== Reception ==
=== Box office ===
In North America, the film opened in second place (behind Monsters vs. Aliens), averaging $8,420 at 2,732 theatres and grossing $23,004,765. The Hollywood Reporter noted the film was a financial success, reporting in June 2009 that it was the 25th-most profitable film of the year at that time.

The film remained in distribution in 39 international markets through July 22, 2010. Its final North American gross was $55.4 million and it made a further $23.4 million internationally for a worldwide total of $78.8 million. In 2012, the film was re-released in Bolivia, where it grossed an additional $41,961.

=== Critical response ===
On the review aggregator website Rotten Tomatoes, 17% of 105 critics' reviews are positive, with an average rating of 4.3/10. The website's consensus reads: "Though it features a few scares and some creepy atmosphere, The Haunting in Connecticut ultimately relies too much on familiar horror cliches to achieve its goals." Metacritic, which uses a weighted average, assigned the film a score of 33 out of 100, based on 23 critics, indicating "generally unfavorable" reviews. Audiences polled by CinemaScore gave the film an average grade of "B−" on an A+ to F scale. While the film was mainly criticized for its use of horror cliches and "jump" scare tactics, certain aspects of the film were praised by many critics, including the atmosphere and performances.

Jeannette Catsoulis of The New York Times praised the film's "genuinely grisly imagery" but expressed dislike for its "screechy" musical score, summarizing: "Spinning another based-on-actual-events tale of a family ejected from its home by angry spirits, The Haunting in Connecticut gives you the creeps, the giggles and the groans in almost equal measure." Alonso Duralde of Today found the film's use of jump scares "gimmicky," adding that he wished the film "had trusted its plot and its dank visuals—which are often extraordinary—instead of relying on cheap thrills of the cat-jumps-out-of-the-closet variety." Film critic Roger Ebert said the film "is a technically proficient horror movie and well acted," though he gave the movie only two stars. Writing for Empire, Kim Newman awarded the film two out of five stars, writing: "There’s a germ of an idea in the terminally ill teen attuned to seeing ghosts because he’s almost one himself, but Gallner’s smothered by Madsen’s hand-wringing mom, Martin Donovan’s dad and smarmy Elias Koteas in an Exorcist hat. It has gruesome touches (a box of snipped-off eyelids), but the sudden-grab scares soon get pretty tiresome."

Jim Vejvoda of IGN found the film "effective" despite being formulaic, adding that it "has very human and relatable characters at its core—a family that was already in peril due to the terminal illness of a family member—that keeps the viewer engaged in the story even as things grow more fantastical." Katherine Monk of the Calgary Herald similarly praised the film's emotional core, writing: "Like all movies crafted in the twilight world between the dead and the living, The Haunting in Connecticut ramps up suspense by pulling these two dimensions as close together as possible—with Matt becoming the human junction point."

Joe Leydon of Variety noted that director Cornwell "sets up the story with brisk efficiency and a reasonable degree of logic," but ultimately felt that "nothing here rises above the level of routine haunted-house bumping-in-the-night." Writing for the Los Angeles Times, Mark Olsen observed that the film "seems most at ease when it is playing more like a domestic drama than a horror tale, with the rather unsettling implication early on that what is happening may be a hallucinatory side effect of the boy’s trial cancer treatments. But Haunting suffers for its need to be sold as a straight-up horror film, and the fact it has been seemingly retrofitted as such."

Tim Robey of The Telegraph gave the film a favorable review, writing: "The movie's heebie-jeebie sound design errs on the side of shameless, but there's a strong emotional core here, and a pretty good script... This is the best [haunted house film] in quite a while." Randall King of the Winnipeg Free Press praised the cast as "sufficiently skilled" and found the atmosphere and filming locations effective. Sara Schieron of Boxoffice Magazine awarded the film three out of five stars, summarizing: "For as flawed as it is, Haunting features too many good bits to disregard... For an odd little relic—or should I say throwback?—the film’s scary parts certainly stick to you. You may laugh at the dramatics but you’ll be afraid to turn the light off when you go to bed."

=== Accolades ===
Award/association	Year	Category	Recipient	Result	Ref.
Fangoria Chainsaw Awards	2010	Best Actress	Virginia Madsen	Nominated	
Fangoria Chainsaw Awards	2010	Best Makeup	Todd Masters	Nominated	
Reaper Awards	2009	Best Ghost Story	The Haunting in Connecticut	Won	
Young Artist Awards	2010	Best Performance in a Feature Film – Supporting Young Actor	Ty Wood	Won	

== Sequel ==
In June 2009, Gold Circle Films announced the development of two unrelated sequels forming a film trilogy, the first titled A Haunting in New York, based on another case profiled on the Discovery Channel series A Haunting. The second planned sequel was entitled A Haunting in Georgia, based on the alleged supernatural experiences of a young girl in Georgia.

While production of A Haunting in New York never materialized, Gold Circle Films produced a spiritual successor sequel, The Haunting in Connecticut 2: Ghosts of Georgia. Ti West was originally attached to direct, though Tom Elkins was ultimately hired as director, with David Coggeshall as the screenwriter. It was released in a limited theatrical run, and through video on demand, on February 1, 2013.

== See also ==
- List of ghost films

== Sources ==
- Brown, Alan (2008). Ghost Hunters of New England. Hanover, New Hampshire: University Press of New England. ISBN 978-1-58465-720-0.
- Nickell, Joe (2012). The Science of Ghosts: Searching for Spirits of the Dead. Prometheus Books. ISBN 978-1-61614-586-6.
- Wetmore, Kevin J. (2021). The Conjuring. Devil's Advocates. Liverpool, England: Liverpool University Press. ISBN 978-1-800-34397-9.
