= David Gale (actor) =

British actor (1936–1991)

- Gale in Re-Animator 1985
- Born: David Quentin Gale; 2 October 1936; Wimbledon, England
- Died: 18 August 1991 (aged 54); Los Angeles, California, U.S.
- Occupation: Actor

David Quentin Gale (2 October 1936 – 18 August 1991) was a British character actor.

He is primarily known for his role as the evil, treacherous, and ultimately, re-animated neurosurgeon Dr. Carl Hill in the 1985 cult classic film Re-Animator, and its 1990 sequel Bride of Re-Animator. After Re-Animator's success, he was cast as a villain in a number of other science fiction and horror films such as The Guyver, The First Power, Syngenor, and The Brain, before his death due to complications of open heart surgery in 1991.

David Gale was also a soap opera actor in the seventies and eighties, appearing as the priest Mark Reddin on The Secret Storm from 1972–74, mobster Beau Richardson on The Edge of Night from 1976–77, and evil Father-In-Law Rusty Sentell, Sr. on Search for Tomorrow from 1982-83.

== Biography ==
Gale was born October 2, 1936, in Wimbledon, England, but moved with his family to New Jersey at a young age. He grew up in a very religious environment; participating in a Catholic choir as a child, and eventually attending St. James Catholic High School in Red Bank, New Jersey. In 1950, at age thirteen, David ran away from home to New York, citing Catholic guilt and emotional struggles. He survived by getting a job as a busboy in an Italian restaurant. He states:

"I looked old for my age. When I was 13, I was very tall — almost as tall as I am now — and I'm 6'3". As a rebellion against my strict religious upbringing and my Catholic guilts, I ran around with the fastest crowd I could find. But that wasn't enough. I got itchy to move. I left Red Bank, New Jersey, where I was going to school, and headed for New York with one of my buddies. I got a job as a busboy and waiter in a spaghetti joint. I used a false name and address and even got a social security card."

He referenced this period of his life often while playing Father Mark Reddin on The Secret Storm, relating the religious conflict the character experienced to his own personal struggles. In one such article, he even mentions an instance where a nun hit him over the back with a broom, breaking the broom.

David stayed in Red Bank, New Jersey, until his sophomore year of high school. He dropped out and joined the air force, where he was stationed in Tripoli, Libya. While in the service, he met an older couple he deemed his "Mother and Father in the theatre"; if it weren't for them, David claimed, he would not have pursued acting as a career. He joined the Little Theatre Troupe while stationed in Libya after seeing a casting call in the paper for John Loves Mary. Afterwards, he was hooked, and after his second appearance in a production, he claimed to have "cried and cried with joy from the sheer thrill of it all," as the curtain came down, stating, "I thought to myself, 'I found a home — the theatre'."

Upon returning to New York, David immediately sought acting gigs, determined to "set the world on fire". He struggled to get his foot in the door, though, so he made do with many odd-end occupations, including: a bartender, a carpenter, a pinboy in a bowling alley, a treetopper, a taxi driver, a sculptor, etc. During this time he would study at the Royal Academy of Dramatic Art (London) and the Actor's Studio (New York). In 1963, he would also enter his first marriage with Sandra Edmonds and have his first child, Meighan Gale. He ran his own experimental theatre in the late sixties and early seventies, the Workshop of the Players Art in New York. During this time he struggled financially, sleeping on the stage of his theatre for about a month. He also battled food insecurity. He gave up running the WPA theatre in 1971, stating, "I got tired of starving — and tired of the city".

David (now split from his first wife), continued to pursue his acting career. He toured Europe performing and starring in many theatre productions, including Hatful of Rain, Elizabeth the Queen (Essex - Fall, 1958), White Devil, Baal, Oh! Calcutta, West Side Story, Dr. Hero, The Crucible (John Proctor), Terra Nova (Scott), Of Mice and Men (Slim - Dec. 18, 1974), The Dodge Boys (Harvey), Sweet Bird of Youth (The Heckler), Othello, What Do They Know About Love Uptown, Joe Egg, The Trial, Dumbwaiter, Send Me No Flowers, and The Seagull (Trigorin). He had many brief/background television and film appearances during this time, too, in Legend of the Lost, Naked City, Search for Tomorrow, Love is a Many Splendored Thing, The Jackie Gleason Show, and Encounter, all uncredited.

His big break came as the role of Father Mark Reddin in The Secret Storm in 1973. The character, a priest, was involved in a storyline in which he left the church to marry a woman (Laurie Stevens, portrayed by Stephanie Braxton), defying his religion. This was extremely controversial at the time, giving the show massive publicity and making David a relatively popular actor among soap viewers. He remained on the show for roughly two years, but eventually it got so controversial that ratings began to plummet, ultimately killing the show in 1974.

After Secret Storm, David would fade in and out of the public consciousness, with his next major roles being Beau Richardson in The Edge of Night (1976), Mac Macauley in Savage Weekend (1979), and Rusty Sentell, Sr. in Search for Tomorrow (1982). During this time he had many other minor roles in a slew of television series and films. He also remarried around this time and had his next child, Derek, while filming as Rusty in Search for Tomorrow.

Gale died of complications from open-heart surgery on August 18, 1991, in Los Angeles, California.

== Filmography ==
Year	Title	Role	Notes
1971	A Weekend with Strangers	Nigel	Lost X-rated film
1973	The Secret Storm	Father Mark Reddin	1973–1974
1975	The American Parade	Unknown	Episode: "The Case Against Milligan"
1976	The Edge of Night	Beau Richardson	1976–1977
1976	Kojak	IAD Man	Episode: "A Hair-Trigger Away"
1979	Savage Weekend	Mac Macauley	
1979	The Doctors	Lieutenant	Episode dated 12/26/1979
1981	Another World	Sheriff Billings	
1981	Ryan's Hope	Martin Slatin / Howard Slatin	
1981	Dream House	Will Cross	
1981	The Molders of Troy	Unknown	
1981	Rolo advertisement	Pirate	Uncredited
1981	UNCF PSA	Confederate	Uncredited
1982	Search for Tomorrow	Rusty Sentell, Sr.	From approximately July/September 1982 to April 1983
1983	The Gold Diggers	The Expert	
1983	Hart to Hart	Walter Sherin	Episode: "Trust Your Hart"
1983	The Dukes of Hazzard	Collins	Episode: "Cooter's Girl"
1985	Guiding Light	Assassin	Episodes dated 11/08/85 and 11/11/85
1985	One Life to Live	Martin Kelly	
1985	Re-Animator	Dr. Carl Hill	
1986	Loving	Bishop McMahon	Episodes dated 9/22/86 and 9/24/86
1987	Tales From the Darkside	Henry Strand	Episode: "Seymourlama"
1988	Jakarta	DeJames	
1988	Nightingales (TV movie)	Bud Granger / Mr. Granger	
1988	The Brain	Dr. Anthony Blakely	
1988	The Naked Gun: From the Files of Police Squad!	Man on Dais at Queen's Reception	Uncredited
1988	Guns of Paradise	Doc Garrison	Episode: "Stray Bullet"
1988	Pulse Pounders	Rat Creature	"The Evil Clergyman" sequence
1989	L.A. Law	Marvin Fitzgerald	Episode: "Izzy Ackerman or Is He Not"
1989	Nightingales (TV series)	Bud Granger / Mr. Granger	Season 1, episode 8
1989	War and Remembrance	Adm. Mick Carney	Part X
1989	Bride of Re-Animator	Doctor Carl Hill	
1990	The First Power	Monsignor	
1990	Syngenor	Carter Brown	
1990	Dallas	Gerhardt / Melvin	Episodes: "Heart and Soul" (1990) and "Peter's Principle" (1984)
1990	Knots Landing	Owen Buchanan / Attorney	Episodes: "A Merry Little Christmas" (1990) and "If I Die Before I Wake" (1990)
1991	Line of Fire: The Morris Dees Story	Benny Hays	
1991	The Guyver	Fulton Balcus	
1991	Switch	Doctor	
1991	The New Adam-12	Teddy Newport	Episode: "Homeless in America"
