= Andrew Trapani =

American film and television producer)

- Born: Andrew J. Trapani

Andrew J. Trapani is an Emmy winning American film and television producer. His film and television credits include Legacy: True Story of the LA Lakers, Winchester, Billy Preston: That’s the Way God Planned It, Lilith Fair: Building a Mystery and The Haunting in Connecticut.

== Career ==
Trapani is co-founder and producer at Sobey Road Entertainment in Los Angeles California. Previously, he was a founding partner at Integrated Films & Management, where he represented writers and directors of such films as HBO’s The Defiant Ones, Final Destination, Live Free or Die Hard and Dear, Zachary. He began his entertainment career as a designer and producer of video games for Crystal Dynamics.

In 2009, he produced The Haunting in Connecticut, which opened at #2 at the box office and went on to gross over $99 million. In 2018, he produced Winchester, a supernatural horror film starring Oscar-winner Helen Mirren. In 2016, production began on a documentary about the Showtime era of the Los Angeles Lakers, which Trapani is producing in partnership with Lakers president Jeanie Buss.

Trapani has worked with filmmakers Antoine Fuqua, Werner Herzog, Robert Zemeckis and Frank Marshall.

Trapani is from Saratoga, California.
