= Bruce Abbott =

American actor (born 1954)

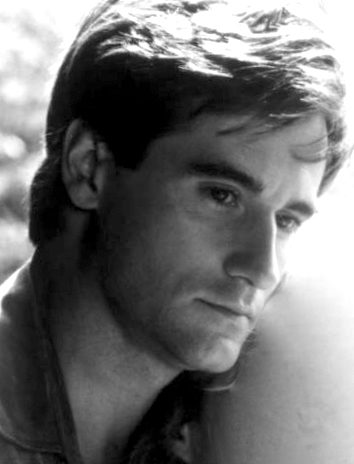
- Abbott in 1988
- Born: Bruce Paul Abbott; July 28, 1954 (age 72); Portland, Oregon, U.S.
- Education: Portland State University; American Conservatory Theater
- Occupation: Actor
- Years active: 1982–present
- Spouses: Linda Hamilton (m. 1982; div. 1989); Kathleen Quinlan (m. 1994; div. 2022)
- Children: 2

Bruce Paul Abbott (born July 28, 1954) is an American actor. Originally beginning his career in theater, Abbott later gained attention for his role as Dan Cain in the cult sci-fi horror films Re-Animator (1985) and Bride of Re-Animator (1990).

He has also had roles in the horror films Bad Dreams (1988), The Prophecy II (1996), and the sci-fi film Out of Time. From 1992 to 1993 he portrayed Judge Nicholas Marshall on the television series Dark Justice.

== Early life ==
Abbott was born and raised in Portland, Oregon, where he graduated from David Douglas High School in 1972. His career began as a dancer and actor in the Oregon Shakespeare Festival in Ashland, Oregon, where he spent three seasons from 1975 to 1978, appearing in productions of A Winter's Tale, All's Well That Ends Well, Henry VI Part 2, The Tempest, and The Tragedy of King Richard III.

He attended Portland State University, and later the American Conservatory Theater in San Francisco, California.

== Career ==
In 1980, Abbott relocated from Portland to Hollywood ("in the middle of the actors' strike, and I didn't know anyone," he recalled). Shortly afterwards, he was cast as the villain in the movie Tag: The Assassination Game. He met his future wife Linda Hamilton on the set.

In 1985, he starred as medical student Dan Cain in Stuart Gordon's sci-fi horror film Re-Animator (1985), a role he reprised in the sequel Bride of Re-Animator (1990). He later starred in Summer Heat (1987), a period drama, with Lori Singer and Kathy Bates. He also starred in the horror film Bad Dreams (1988) directed by Andrew Fleming, and the comedy Casual Sex? (1989). Abbott had a lead role in the futuristic television film Out of Time (1988), with Bill Maher. In 1991, he appeared as Harry Pierpont in the television film Dillinger, with Sherilyn Fenn and Patricia Arquette. From 1992 to 1993, he starred as Judge Nicholas Marshall in the series Dark Justice.

Throughout his career, Abbott has been a guest star on many TV series, including Murder, She Wrote; Family Law; Diagnosis: Murder; and more. He had a supporting role in the short-lived series The Net, based on the film of the same title starring Sandra Bullock. He appeared in the horror sequel The Prophecy II (1996), with Christopher Walken and Brittany Murphy.

Abbott is semi-retired from acting. He is an architect and artist and works in the custom-design industry.

== Personal life ==
Abbott married Linda Hamilton in 1982; the union produced one child, Dalton Abbott (born October 4, 1989) (who can be seen in Terminator 2: Judgment Day as Infant John Connor). They divorced soon after, in 1989. Abbott married Kathleen Quinlan on April 12, 1994; they have one son, Tyler Quinlan (born October 17, 1990). Abbott and Quinlan divorced amicably in 2022.

== Filmography ==
=== Film ===
Year	Title	Role	Notes
1982	Tag: The Assassination Game	Loren Gersh	
1984	Why Me?	Markus	Television film
1984	The Last Starfighter	Rylan Sargent	
1984	Velvet	Breed	Television film
1985	Re-Animator	Dan Cain	
1985	Command 5	Deke Williams	Television film
1987	Summer Heat	Jack Ruffin	
1987	Interzone	Swan	
1988	Baja Oklahoma	Dove Christian	
1988	Bad Dreams	Dr. Alex Karmen	
1988	Casual Sex?	Keith	
1988	Out of Time	Channing Taylor	Television film
1989	Trapped	John Doe	Television film
1990	Bride of Re-Animator	Dr. Dan Cain	
1990	Johnny Ryan	Tom Kelly	Television film
1990	Kaleidoscope	Sam	Television film
1991	Dillinger	Harry Pierpont	
1995	The Demolitionist	Professor Jack Crowley	
1995	Black Scorpion	Michael Russo	
1997	Melanie Darrow	Alex Kramer	Television film
1998	The Prophecy II	Thomas Daggett	
2002	Trance	Taylor Black	
2007	Humble Pie	Captain Atticus	
2009	Adult Film: A Hollywood Tale	President Brad	
2010	Eagles in the Chicken Coop	President Brad	

=== Television ===
Year	Title	Role	Notes
1982	The Blue and the Gray	Jake Hale Jr.	Miniseries
1985	MacGyver	Major Nikolai Kossov	1 episode
1988–1990	Beauty and the Beast	Devin Wells	2 episodes
1990	Father Dowling Mysteries	Nick Moran	1 episode
1991–95	Murder, She Wrote	Various	3 episodes
1992–93	Dark Justice	Judge Nicholas Marshall	44 episodes
1994	Diagnosis Murder	Paul Madison	1 episode
1998	The Net	Walter Cizelski	4 episodes
2000–02	Family Law	Colin Andrews	4 episodes
2002	UC: Undercover	Edward Curtis	1 episode
