= Never Back Down =

2008 film by Jeff Wadlow

- Theatrical release poster
- Directed by: Jeff Wadlow
- Written by: Chris Hauty
- Produced by: Craig Baumgarten; David Zelon
- Starring: Sean Faris; Amber Heard; Cam Gigandet; Evan Peters; Leslie Hope; Djimon Hounsou
- Cinematography: Lukas Ettlin
- Edited by: Victor Du Bois; Debra Weinfeld
- Music by: Michael Wandmacher
- Production company: Mandalay Independent Pictures
- Distributed by: Summit Entertainment
- Release date: March 14, 2008
- Running time: 115 minutes
- Country: United States
- Language: English
- Budget: $20 million
- Box office: $41.6 million

Never Back Down is a 2008 American martial arts sports drama film directed by Jeff Wadlow and starring Sean Faris and Cam Gigandet. It tells the story of a frustrated and conflicted teenager who arrives at a new high school and discovers an underground fight club there.

The film was theatrically released on March 14, 2008 by Summit Entertainment. It received generally negative reviews from critics, though it successfully grossed $41.6 million worldwide against a budget of $20 million. It was followed by a titular film series, which included three sequels.

== Plot ==
Jake Tyler has recently moved from Iowa to Orlando, Florida with his mother, Margot, and younger brother, Charlie, because the move furthers Charlie's budding tennis career.

Jake's father died in a drunk-driving car crash, which classmates have taunted him about. An internet video of Jake fighting with an opponent football player in Iowa, who mocks him, is shared at his new school, giving him a reputation.

Initially, Jake has trouble fitting in. While walking, he sees Max Cooperman seemingly being beaten up by bullies. When he tries to intervene, Max and his friends tell him off, as the "bullying" was actually a consensual mixed martial arts fight.

Later, Jake is invited to a party by classmate Baja Miller. There, he is unwillingly pulled into a fight with Ryan McCarthy, the school's MMA champion and also Baja's boyfriend. Initially refusing to fight, Jake snaps when Ryan jokes about his father's death. Ryan easily defeats him, and a video of it circulating in the school humiliates him.

Max befriends Jake, introduces him to MMA, and connects him with instructor Jean Roqua. After passing Roqua's physical tests and impressing him with his willpower, he is accepted as his student. Roqua forewarns Jake that he forbids fighting outside the gym for any reason while under his instruction. If he does, he will be thrown out of his gym. While Jake trains under Roqua, he initially struggles to quell his anger towards Ryan.

Baja apologizes to Jake for coercing him into a fight with Ryan, but he refuses to forgive her. When Ryan shows no remorse for the fight or his sadistic tendencies, Baja breaks up with him. Jake intervenes to protect her, so Ryan again insults him about his father and leaves.

At practice, Jake is still furious over what happened. Roqua tells him to leave until he cools off. In Max's car, Jake gets into a road-rage brawl that Max films. The video circulates the school and raises Jake's social status, prompting Ryan to confront him.

Ryan roughs up Jake in a bathroom and challenges him to compete in the Beatdown, an underground fighting tournament in which Ryan is the reigning champion. When Roqua discovers that Jake has fought outside the gym, he kicks him out and tells him not to return. Jake convinces him a short while later to take him back. Roqua puts him through more rigorous training, which he uses as preparation for the Beatdown.

After a workout, Roqua confides in Jake that he is in self-imposed exile from Brazil. His brother was a skilled MMA fighter and had handily beaten a local troublemaker. The man later returned with a gun and murdered him. Their father blames him for the death, saying he should have been watching out for his brother.

Initially not interested in competing in the Beatdown, he changes his mind after Ryan assaults Max, putting him in the hospital. Jake confides in Roqua about participating in the Beatdown. They initially argue, but he eventually relents, reminding Jake to "control the outcome."

Jake arrives at the tournament, and he and Ryan make their way through each round, each emerging victorious. Jake makes it to the semifinals despite an injury he received in the previous match. After learning that Ryan was disqualified in his semifinal match due to an illegal eye gouge, Jake forfeits, seeing no reason to continue.

As Jake attempts to leave, Ryan confronts him, and they fight outside in the parking lot. Jake's injuries limit him, so Ryan, at first, gains the upper hand and applies a front headlock choke on Jake. However, Jake escapes using his MMA training, and knocks out Ryan with a combination that Roqua had taught him. Jake wins the respect of his fellow students, including Ryan, and Roqua returns to Brazil to reconcile with his father.

== Cast ==
- Sean Faris as Jake "The Gridiron" Tyler, a trouble-prone teenager
- Amber Heard as Baja Miller.
- Cam Gigandet as Ryan "The Terror" McCarthy, Jake's rival
- Djimon Hounsou as Jean Roqua, Max's mentor who agrees to train Jake
- Evan Peters as Max Cooperman, a classmate who introduces Jake to MMA and befriends him
- Wyatt Smith as Charlie Tyler, Jake's younger brother
- Leslie Hope as Margot Tyler, Jake's mother
- Tilky Jones as Eric
- Neil Brown Jr. as Aaron, Ryan's best friend
- Jonathan Eusebio as Dak Ho

== Production ==
The fighter actors went through three months of MMA training before filming began in Orlando, Florida.

Additionally, an Orlando high school was used when filming: Cypress Creek High School.

== Reception ==
=== Box office ===
Never Back Down debuted in 2,729 theaters at #3 with $8,603,195 in the opening weekend. After 2 weeks in cinemas, it garnered $18,890,093; and after one month the film earned $37,676,991 worldwide.

The film closed on June 5, 2008, after 84 days at the North American box office with $41,627,431 worldwide against a budget of $20 million.

=== Critical response ===
On Rotten Tomatoes, the film has an approval rating of 20% based on 83 reviews, with an average score of 4.4/10. The site's consensus states: "Though not without its pleasures, Never Back Down faithfully adheres to every imaginable fight movie cliché". On Metacritic, the film has a weighted average score of 39 out of 100 based on reviews from 22 critics, indicating "generally unfavorable reviews".

Gregory Kirschling of Entertainment Weekly gave the film a D, calling it "dopey. And with its emphasis on stupid violence, xylophone abs, and getting yourself on YouTube, it's yet another product that makes you feel bad about today's youth culture". Michael Phillips of Chicago Tribune gave the film two out of four stars, saying "[i]t's a little Karate Kid, a smidge of Fight Club (with none of the ironic ambivalence toward violence that David Fincher brought to that story), a lot of The O.C. (evil boy Gigandet played an evil boy on that series), and presto: probable hit".

Richard Roeper gave the film a positive review: "I laughed so much at the litany of clichés that I finally had to admit I was entertained from start to finish by this cheesy knock-off".

Movie historian Leonard Maltin cited the picture as "A wildly improbable and cliched, yet entertaining (particularly for fans of this genre), variation on The Karate Kid...wherein Faris and Heard have the Ralph Macchio and (respectively) Elisabeth Shue roles, while Gigandet (who can glare with the best of them) is in William Zabka's...All in all, the film Showdown tried to be".

Former UFC champions Dricus Du Plessis and Jiri Prochazka both cited the film as an inspiration for wanting to become an MMA fighter.

=== Accolades ===
Year	Award	Category	Nominee	Result
2008	MTV Movie Award	Best Fight	Sean Faris and Cam Gigandet	Won

== Home media ==
The DVD was released on July 29, 2008, and has so far sold 990,405 units, bringing in $18,495,324 in revenue. This does not include Blu-ray sales.

An unrated version called the "Extended Beat Down Edition", featuring nudity and more blood, was released on DVD on July 29, 2008.

== Soundtrack ==
1. "Above and Below" – The Bravery
2. "Anthem for the Underdog" – 12 Stones
3. "Teenagers" – My Chemical Romance
4. "Someday" – Flipsyde
5. "Wolf Like Me" – TV on the Radio
6. "Under the Knife" – Rise Against
7. "Time Won't Let Me Go" – The Bravery
8. "Rock Star" – Chamillionaire & Lil Wayne
9. "Be Safe" – The Cribs
10. "Headstrong" – Trapt
11. "False Pretense" – The Red Jumpsuit Apparatus
12. "Orange Marmalade" – Mellowdrone
13. "You Are Mine" – Mutemath
14. "Stronger" – Kanye West feat Daft Punk
15. "Crank That (Travis Barker Rock Remix)" – Soulja Boy Tell 'Em and Travis Barker
16. "The Slam" – TobyMac
17. "Lights Out" - Breaking Benjamin
18. "Face the pain" - Stemm
19. "...To Be Loved" – Papa Roach (featured during theatrical trailer)

The trance track played, when Ryan and his dad argue, is called "Estuera – Tales From The South (Jonas Steur's Flow Revision)", it did not feature on the soundtrack. It's from the album In Search of Sunrise 5: Los Angeles – Tiesto.

== Sequels ==
A 2011 sequel titled Never Back Down 2: The Beatdown was released with Evan Peters reprising his role as Max Cooperman. Directed by Michael Jai White in his directorial debut, the film stars White alongside Alex Meraz, Jillian Murray, MMA fighters Todd Duffee, Lyoto Machida, Scott Epstein and Australian actor-singer Dean Geyer.

A second sequel, released in 2016, titled Never Back Down: No Surrender was again directed by White, who also reprises his role as Case Walker. The film also stars Josh Barnett, Gillian Waters, Steven Quardos, Nathan Jones and Esai Morales.

A third sequel, titled Never Back Down: Revolt, which is directed by Kellie Madison, was released in 2021. With no returning cast, the movie stars Olivia Popica, Michael Bisping, Brooke Johnston, Vanessa Campos, Diana Hoyos, Neetu Chandra and James Faulkner.

== Bibliography ==
- Modern Day Karate Kid packs a punch - Washington Square News (Feb. 22, 2008)
- never back down - The Duke Chronicle (March 5, 2008)
- What's Your Fight? Hollyscoop (March 7, 2008)
- Bill Higgins (March 5, 2008). "Never Back Down Gets Its Kicks". Variety.
- Never Back Down Taking A Blog Beating UFC Daily (March 8, 2008)
- Mariana McConnell (March 4, 2008). "Never Back Down Writer Chris Hauty". CinemaBlend.
- Constance Droganes (March 14, 2008). "Fight Club: Oscar-nominee Djimon Hounsou kicks things up with martial arts flick". CTV News. Archived from the original on October 22, 2012.
- Philip Marchand (March 14, 2008). "'Never Back Down': Realism takes a sucker punch". Toronto Star. 2 out of 4 stars.
- Actors elevate fight film plot you know Las Vegas Sun (March 14, 2008)
- John Anderson (March 13, 2008). "SxSW Reviews: Never Back Down". Variety.com. Archived from the original on December 18, 2008.
- Never Back Down Newsday (March 14, 2008)
- Dan Bennett (March 13, 2008). "Never Back Down' mixes it up with mixed results". San Diego Union-Tribune.
- Fight feature: Wadlow's second film a manly movie The Hook 23 (March 13, 2008)
