= Hiroshi Shirokuma =

Japanese voice actor (born 1979)

- 白熊 寛嗣
- Born: August 4, 1979 (age 47); Kanagawa Prefecture, Japan
- Occupation: Voice actor
- Years active: 2003–present
- Agent: Production Baobab
- Height: 175 cm (5 ft 9 in)

Hiroshi Shirokuma (白熊 寛嗣, Shirokuma Hiroshi) is a Japanese voice actor who is affiliated with Production Baobab.

== Filmography ==
=== Television animation ===
- Fullmetal Alchemist (2004), Soldier A
- Naruto (2006), Toki
- Eden of the East (2009), Yūsei Kondō
- Brave Spirits Brave (2011), Jeraid
- Naruto Shippuden (2012), Kushimaru Kuriarare
- Fairy Tail (2012), Azuma, Gran Doma, Warrod Sequen
- Overlord (2017), Gazef Stronoff
- Carole and Tuesday (2019), OG Bulldog
- Radiant (2019), Brangoire
- One Piece (2020), Gyukimaru
- Boruto: Naruto Next Generations (2020), Valleys Daimyo
- Yashahime: Princess Half-Demon (2020), Tōtetsu
- Beastars (2021), Riz
- The World Ends with You the Animation (2021), Megumi Kitaniji
- Tropical-Rouge! Pretty Cure (2021), Chongire
- Don't Hurt Me, My Healer! (2022), Mostly Bear
- Utawarerumono: Mask of Truth (2022), Munto
- Wonderful PreCure! (2024), Tsuyoshi Inukai
- Brave Bang Bravern! (2024), Isao Kawada
- Yatagarasu: The Raven Does Not Choose Its Master (2024), Rokon
- Sword of the Demon Hunter: Kijin Gentōshō (2024), Dōga no Oni
- Go! Go! Loser Ranger! Season 2 (2025), Mine Gatō
- Solo Leveling (2025), Rakan
- Jujutsu Kaisen (2026), Jinichi Zen'in, Cursed Spirits Chasing Itadori
- The Ghost in the Shell (2026), Sagawa Electronics Corperation President

=== Theatrical animation ===
- Mobile Suit Gundam Hathaway: The Sorcery of Nymph Circe (2026), Brinks Wedge

=== Original net animation ===
- Kengan Ashura (2019), Julius Reinhold, Shigeru Komada

=== Video games ===
- Final Fantasy XIII-2 (2011), Caius Ballad
- Injustice: Gods Among Us (2013), Bane
- Lightning Returns: Final Fantasy XIII (2013), Caius Ballad
- Fire Emblem Heroes (2015), Caineghis
- Grimms Notes (2016), John Silver
- The Last Guardian (2016), 'Old man'
- Dissidia Final Fantasy Opera Omnia (2017), Caius Ballad
- League of Legends (2017), Malcolm Graves
- Sushi Striker: The Way of Sushido (2018), Abricoth
- Soulcalibur VI (2018), Cervantes de Leon
- Judgment (2018), Ryusuke Kido
- Resident Evil Village (2021), Karl Heisenberg
- Trek to Yomi (2022), Sanjuro
- Star Ocean: The Divine Force (2022), Aucerius Raimbaut
- Final Fantasy XVI (2023), Cidolfus Telamon
- Wuthering Waves (2024), Yuanwu

=== Tokusatsu ===
- Kamen Rider Saber (2020), Golem Megid (ep. 1)
- Kamen Rider MY-TH (2026), Ryuz

=== Dubbing ===
==== Live-action ====
- 16 Blocks, Capt. Dan Gruber (Casey Sander)
- 21 Jump Street, Capt. Dickson (Ice Cube)
- 22 Jump Street, Capt. Dickson (Ice Cube)
- Accident Man, Milton (David Paymer)
- The Adjustment Bureau, Harry Mitchell (Anthony Mackie)
- Alien: Covenant, Cole (Uli Latukefu)
- Autómata, Wallace (Dylan McDermott)
- Captain Marvel, Ronan the Accuser (Lee Pace)
- Centurion, Bothos (David Morrissey)
- Chapter 27, Paul Goresh (Judah Friedlander)
- Civil War, Joel (Wagner Moura)
- Cop Out, Poh Boy (Guillermo Díaz)
- Dark Phoenix, Ariki (Andrew Stehlin)
- Deliver Us from Evil, Mendoza (Édgar Ramírez)
- Doctor Sleep, Billy Freeman (Cliff Curtis)
- Dynasty, Michael Culhane (Robert Christopher Riley)
- Extreme Job, Chief Go (Ryu Seung-ryong)
- Four Christmases, Brad McVee (Vince Vaughn)
- Game of Thrones, Bronn (Jerome Flynn), Gregor Clegane (Conan Stevens)
- Get on Up, Bobby Byrd (Nelsan Ellis)
- Guardians of the Galaxy, Ronan the Accuser (Lee Pace)
- Guy Ritchie's The Covenant, Ahmed (Dar Salim)
- Halo, Captain Jacob Keyes (Danny Sapani)
- The Hate U Give, Maverick Carter (Russell Hornsby)
- Heart of Stone, Mulvaney (Enzo Cilenti)
- I Love You, Man, Sydney (Jason Segel)
- In the Lost Lands, Boyce (Dave Bautista)
- Independence Day: Resurgence, Agent Matthew Travis (Gbenga Akinnagbe)
- Indiana Jones and the Temple of Doom (2009 WOWOW edition), Chen (Chua Kah Joo)
- The Lazarus Project, Rebrov (Tom Burke)
- Marley & Me, Sebastian Tunney (Eric Dane)
- Marry Me, Bastian (Maluma)
- Midway, Commander Joseph Rochefort (Brennan Brown)
- NCIS: New Orleans, Quentin Carter (Charles Michael Davis)
- Never Back Down 2: The Beatdown, Case Walker (Michael Jai White)
- Never Back Down: No Surrender, Case Walker (Michael Jai White)
- New Amsterdam, Dr. Floyd Reynolds (Jocko Sims)
- No Time to Die, Bill Tanner (Rory Kinnear)
- Once Upon a Time, Robin Hood (Sean Maguire)
- The Originals, Marcel Gerard (Charles Michael Davis)
- Pain & Gain, Adrian "Noel" Doorbal (Anthony Mackie)
- The Ridiculous 6, Chico Stockburn (Terry Crews)
- The Running Man, Evan McCone (Lee Pace)
- Running Wild with Bear Grylls, Rainn Wilson
- Scandal, Marcus Walker (Cornelius Smith Jr.)
- Suburbicon, Ira Sloan (Glenn Fleshler)
- Supergirl, Krem (Matthias Schoenaerts)
- Sushi Girl, Duke (Tony Todd)
- Tactical Force, SWAT Sergeant Tony Hunt (Michael Jai White)
- Turn Up Charlie, Charlie (Idris Elba)
- The Walking Dead, Tyreese Williams (Chad L. Coleman)
- War for the Planet of the Apes, Red (Ty Olsson)
- War Room, Tony Jordan (T.C. Stallings)
- Zero Dark Thirty, Dan Fuller (Jason Clarke)

==== Animation ====
- Teen Titans (2003), See-More
- Star Wars: The Clone Wars (2008), Turk Falso
- Wreck-It Ralph, (2013) Kohut
- My Little Pony: Friendship is Magic, (2013) Big Macintosh
- ParaNorman, (2013) Mr. Prenderghast
- Regular Show, (2013) Skips
- Planes: Fire & Rescue, (2014) Avalanche
- Clarence, (2015) Bucky O'Neil
- Star Wars Rebels, (2015) (Kanan Jarrus)
- Zootopia, (2016) Finnick
- The Lego Batman Movie, (2017) Bane
- Hazbin Hotel, (2024) Zestial
- Secret Level, (2024) Bladeguard Sergeant Metaurus
- Helluva Boss, (2025) Asmodeus
