= Never Back Down (film series) =

Series of American martial arts films

- Official film series logo, as originally released in 2008.
- Based on: Characters created by Chris Hauty
- Starring: Sean Faris; Djimon Hounsou; Michael Jai White; Dean Geyer; Olivia Popica; Various other actors See detailed list
- Distributed by: Summit Entertainment (1); Stage 6 Films (2); Destination Films (3-4); Sony Pictures Home Entertainment (2-4)
- Country: United States
- Language: English
- Budget: $23,000,000 (2 films)
- Box office: $41,627,431 (Total from 1 theatrical release)

The Never Back Down film series consists of American martial arts sport movies, centered around an original story and characters created by Chris Hauty. The plot of each installment details the events that surround its various underdog characters, who must exceed expectations and overpower their more experienced competition in a variety of legal, semi-legal, and illegal MMA competitions.

The series as a whole has been met with mixed critical and financial successes. The original movie received poor response from critics, despite earning a profit at the box office. The second and third installments which followed earned praise from critics who considered them an improvement, though their monetary performance on home video is unknown. Conversely, the fourth film had mixed reception critically, with various reactions calling it inferior to its predecessors, while others believed it was a worthy sequel from the female perspective. Despite each movie's initial performance, they were later classified by some critics through modern analyses as some of the best classics of their genre.

== Films ==
Film	U.S. release date	Director	Screenwriter	Story by	Producers
Never Back Down	March 14, 2008	Jeff Wadlow	Chris Hauty	Chris Hauty	Craig Baumgarten and David Zelon
Never Back Down 2: The Beatdown	September 13, 2011	Michael Jai White	Chris Hauty	Chris Hauty	Craig Baumgarten and David Zelon
Never Back Down: No Surrender	June 7, 2016	Michael Jai White	Chris Hauty	Michael Jai White & Chris Hauty	Craig Baumgarten and David Zelon
Never Back Down: Revolt	November 16, 2021	Kellie Madison	Audrey Arkins	Audrey Arkins	Craig Baumgarten, David Zelon and Ben Jacques

=== Never Back Down (2008) ===
After moving to Florida with his mother and brother, Jake Tyler faces the challenges of being treated as an outsider at his new high school. Despite this, he looks for every opportunity to get to know his peers and tries to impress a girl from his classes named Baja Miller. Confronting the various challenging experiences of being bullied by his classmates with outbursts of anger, Jake gets into a fight at a party where he ultimately loses. Humiliated, Jake is encouraged by one of his peers named Max Cooperman to learn how to properly fight through athletic coaching. Introduced to Max's mentor named Jean Roqua, Jake discovers a new passion as he begins to learn mixed martial arts and becomes involved in a fighting tournament known as "The Beatdown" to overcome the expectations of those around him.

=== Never Back Down 2: The Beatdown (2011) ===
Max Cooperman is once again tasked with organizing The Beatdown, a secret MMA tournament. Cooperman works alongside his mentor who is a retired professional UFC athlete named Casey "Case" Walker Jr. to recruit a group of amateur fighters for the event including a talented wrestler named Mike Stokes, a former-boxer named Zack Gomes, a talented recent martial arts fighter named Tim Newhouse, and an outcast store clerk named Justin Epstein who was brought in after Case and Tim chased off guys trying to mug him. Working together to train for the event, the group quickly become friends and gain an appreciation for teamwork, athleticism, and the life-lessons that Case shares with them. When he is confronted by local law enforcement, who move to charge him with violating his probation, the group of friends discover that there is a traitor in their midst when its revealed that Case was set up. When Mike finds the perpetrator, he becomes more determined than before to win the competition and make his mentor proud.

=== Never Back Down: No Surrender (2016) ===
For a couple of years, Casey "Case" Walker Jr. has enjoyed success when he returned from retirement to fight in mixed martial arts tournaments. Following a series of successes however, Case has grown tired of the career and resorts to amateur matches while also proceeding with training athletes new to the sport. While mentoring a couple of up-and-coming fighters hone their skills, Case is surprised when an old friend named Brody James approaches him to serve as his trainer for a Primal Fighting Combat (PFC) Championship. Scheduled by a corrupt promoter named Hugo Vega to challenge a massive opponent named Caesar Braga who is known for standing seven-feet tall and for being a significant challenge. James sees Braga is the ultimate fighter and asks for Case's assistance. Initially hesitant, Case agrees to a collaboration with his friend's current trainer named Matty Ramos, with intentions of helping James also address some personal issues as well. Resorting to steroid abuse during his training, James becomes jealous of Case when he and the PFC marketing manager named Mya Cruz becomes romantically involved. Determined to overcome the challenges of his past James agrees to abandoning the substance abuse and returns to traditional training, only to sustain a knee injury at the hands of a trainer named Boris. As Vega approaches him with a challenge to fight Braga, Case begins to question whether injury was an intentional setup by the promoter. Case becomes the student when he trades places with Brody, while the latter becomes his trainer alongside Ramos; Case agrees to fight the massive opponent Braga, and is determined to avenge his friend.

=== Never Back Down: Revolt (2021) ===
Anya and Aslan, two Chechen immigrants who moved to England, work tirelessly to make ends meet. Aslan repeatedly receives beatings when he engages in amateur fights to earn some money for their wellbeing, but also secretly owes a large sum of money to a criminal organization. Matters escalate when Aslan is not able to repay his debtor, a villainous woman named Mariah, as the debt notice is called. When Anya pleads for his case, the crime lord makes a preposition where Anya will agree to be taken to a remote location where she'll compete in underground fights with other women until Aslan's debts are repaid. Agreeing to the terms, Anya is surprised when she arrives at large estate and is thrown into imprisonment alongside various other women. The group is forced into combating their fellow prisoners, and matters become dire when one of their companions dies following a violent beating at the hands of an experienced MMA fighter named Janek. Suddenly, Anya realizes the women's situation and determines that unless they escape and defeat their captors, they will all be sold into human trafficking once this syndicate grows tired of their entertainment. Refusing to become victims, Anya begins a revolution with her competitors and they group determine to fight for their lives.

== Main cast and characters ==
List indicators

This section includes characters who will appear or have appeared in the franchise in main roles.

- An empty grey cell indicates the character was not in the film, or that the character's official presence has not yet been confirmed.
- ^{A} indicates an appearance through archival footage or audio.

Character	Films			
Character	Never Back Down	Never Back Down 2: The Beatdown	Never Back Down: No Surrender	Never Back Down: Revolt
Principal cast
Jake "The Gridiron" Tyler	Sean Faris			
Baja Miller	Amber Heard			
Jean Roqua	Djimon Hounsou			
Ryan "The Terror" McCarthy	Cam Gigandet			
Casey "Case" Walker Jr.		Michael Jai White	Michael Jai White	
Mike "Wrestler Kid" Stokes		Dean Geyer		
Justin Epstein		Scott Epstein		
Myca Cruz			Gillian White	
Brody James			Josh Barnett	
Hugo Vega			Esai Morales	
Caesar Braga			Nathan Jones	
Anya				Olivia Popica
Aslan				Tommy Bastow
Janek				Michael Bisping
Supporting cast
Max Cooperman	Evan Peters	Evan Peters	Evan Peters^{A}	
Zack "Smoke and Thunder" Gomes		Alex Meraz		
Tim Newhouse		Todd Duffee		
Matty Ramos			Stephen Quadros	
Taj Mahale			Amarin Cholvibul	
"Creech"			Daniel Renalds	
Lori				Hannah Al Rashid
Mali				Vanessa Campos
Valentina				Diana Hoyos
Julian				James Faulkner

== Additional crew and production details ==
Film	Crew/Detail					
Film	Composer	Cinematographer	Editor(s)	Production companies	Distributing company	Running time
Never Back Down	Michael Wandmacher	Lukas Ettlin	Victor Du Bois & Debra Weinfeld	Mandalay Independent Pictures	Summit Entertainment	1 hr 55 mins
Never Back Down 2: The Beatdown	David Wittman	Yaron Levi	Debra Weinfeld	Mandalay Pictures, BMP Inc.	Stage 6 Films	1 hr 43 mins
Never Back Down: No Surrender	Frederik Wiedmann	Ross W. Clarkson	Scott Richter	Mandalay Pictures, BMP Inc.	Destination Films	1 hr 42 mins
Never Back Down: Revolt	Ram Khatabakhsh	Oliver Loncraine	Emma Gaffney	Mandalay Pictures, Destination Films, Wonder Street Fiction Films	Sony Pictures Home Entertainment	1 hr 29 mins

== Reception ==
=== Box office and financial performance ===
Film	Box office gross			Box office ranking		Total home video sales	Worldwide gross total income	Budget	Worldwide net total income	Ref.
Film	North America	Other territories	Worldwide	All-time North America	All-time worldwide	Total home video sales	Worldwide gross total income	Budget	Worldwide net total income	Ref.
Never Back Down	$24,850,922	$16,776,509	$41,627,431	#3,380	#3,631	$21,341,760	$62,969,191	$20,000,000	$42,969,191	
Never Back Down 2: The Beatdown	—N/a	—N/a	—N/a	—N/a	—N/a	Information not publicly available	Information not publicly available	$3,000,000	Information not publicly available	
Never Back Down: No Surrender	—N/a	—N/a	—N/a	—N/a	—N/a	Information not publicly available	Information not publicly available	Information not publicly available	Information not publicly available	
Never Back Down: Revolt	—N/a	—N/a	—N/a	—N/a	—N/a	$5,957	Information not publicly available	Information not publicly available	Information not publicly available	

=== Critical and public response ===
Film	Rotten Tomatoes	Metacritic	
Film	Never Back Down	21% (84 reviews)	39/100 (22 reviews)
Never Back Down 2: The Beatdown	TBD (1 review)	—N/a	
Never Back Down: No Surrender	TBD (1 review)	—N/a	
Never Back Down: Revolt	TBD (2 reviews)	—N/a	
