= Once Upon a Time in Bihar =

Once Upon A Time In Bihar
- Directed by: Nitin Chandra
- Screenplay by: Nitin Chandra
- Story by: Nitin Chandra
- Produced by: Neetu Chandra, Nitin Chandra & Samir Kumar
- Starring: Ashish Vidyarthi; Kranti Prakash Jha; Ajay Kumar; Arti Puri; Pankaj Jha; Deepak Singh
- Release date: 30 October 2015 (India)
- Country: India
- Language: Hindi

Once Upon A Time In Bihar is an Indian political/social drama film directed by Nitin Chandra, Produced by Neetu Chandra and Samir Kumar starring Ashish Vidyarthi, Kranti Prakash Jha, Ajay Kumar, Arti Puri, Pankaj Jha and Deepak Singh. The film is released on 30 October 2015. This film was earlier released in Bhojpuri in November 2011 under the name Deswa.

== Cast ==
- Ashish Vidyarthi as Madan Sharma
- Kranti Prakash Jha as Rajiv Kumar
- Ajay Kumar as Jeans
- Arti Puri as Seema
- Pankaj Jha as Bisnu
- Deepak Singh as Sankar Pandey

== Production ==
=== Casting ===
The film has 3 new actors Deepak Singh, Ajay Kumar and Kranti Prakash Jha. It also has veteran actors Ashish Vidyarthi and Arti Puri playing important role.

=== Filming ===
The film was shot over a period of 2 years. The major part of film was shot in Buxar District of Bihar.

== Critical response ==
Renuka Vyavahare of Times of India wrote, "While the story is relevant, setting authentic and performances decent, the sluggish pace is sleep-inducing." Vyavahare also noted that while the socio-political issues raised by the film were important, the meaning is lost as the characters come across as hypocritical. "Sadly, all they do is preach and then commit an idiotic crime themselves, much against their own values and beliefs." Vyavahare subsequently gave the film a rating of two stars out of five. Subhash K Jha of Skjbollywoodnews.com gave the film three stars out of five, praising the actors for delivering "fully believable performances", but noting that "the film flounders in the over-dramatic pauses in the plot" Free Press Journal also levied criticism at the story line in their two stars out of five review, describing the film as "not being singularly focused and with a few plot-holes, the story seems superficial, convoluted and manufactured."

== Soundtrack ==
The soundtrack for the film is released by T-Series label and includes songs performed by singers Sonu Nigam, Mohit Chauhan, Sharda Sinha, Swanand Kirkire and Bharat Vyas. The music director is Ashutosh Singh.

No.	Title	Length
