= Shaque =

Shaque (lit. 'Doubt', transl. Suspicion) may refer to:

- Shaque (film), a 1976 Indian film
- Shaque (TV series), a 2026 Indian series
- Be-Shaque, a 1980 Indian film

== See also ==
- Mysteries Shaque, a 2004 Indian film
