= Chhath (film) =

2025 Bhojpuri drama film

Chhath is a 2025 Bhojpuri drama produced by Nitu Chandra and directed by Nitin Chandra. This film depicts the Bhojpuri culture and Chhath festival. The film stars Deepak Singh in the lead role and the other actors are Shashi Verma and Sneha pallavi

Chhath has been selected to be premiered at the International Film Festival of India in Indian Panorama section.

== Cast ==
- Shashi Verma as Gobind
- Deepak Kumar
- Sneha Pallavi
- Meghna Panchal

== Plot ==
The story is about a family that gathers to celebrate Chhath village, where misunderstanding happens between the uncle and nephew.

== Release ==
Chhath was released on 24 October on Waves OTT of Prasar Bharati. It has been premiered at the International Film Festival of India in Indian Panorama section.

In 2026, it was premiered at Indian Film Festival of Melbourne.
