= Kranti Prakash Jha =

Actor

- Born: 2 November 1988 (age 37); Begusarai, Bihar, India
- Education: Hindu College Delhi University
- Occupations: Actor; film producer; television personality; businessman; model
- Years active: 2014–present

Kranti Prakash Jha (born 2 November 1988) is an Indian actor, film producer, television personality, businessman and model best known for his role of Santosh Lal in the 2016 Indian biographical sports film M.S. Dhoni: The Untold Story.

== Career ==
He did his schooling from Purnia, Bihar. His father was a bureaucrat and was posted as RDDE at Purnia. He then studied at Hindu College, University of Delhi.

== Career ==
He began his career by appearing in ads. He has featured in numerous TV commercials and music videos. He debuted in the lead role in the award-winning Maithili film Mithila Makhaan. He appeared in the Bhojpuri films Deswa and Once Upon a Time in Bihar in lead roles.

His recent portrayal of a young migrant Bihari in the viral Chhath music video with Kristine Zedek - sung by Sharda Sinha, directed By National Award winner Nitin Neera Chandra, and produced by Neetu Chandra - brought him many laurels and appraisals from fans. He was next seen in the Discovery Jeet's biopic on Indian hockey coach Harinder Singh.

He currently plays the lead role in the web series Raktanchal released on MX Player.

== Filmography ==
Key
†	Denotes films that have not yet been released

=== Films ===
Year	Film	Role	Notes
2011	Viklap	Soham Bakshi	
2011	Deswa	Unnamed	
2013	Goliyon Ki Raasleela Ram-Leela	Veer	
2015	Once Upon a Time in Bihar	Rajiv Kumar	
2016	M.S. Dhoni: The Untold Story	Santosh Lal (Dhoni's friend)	
2018	Kaashi in Search of Ganga	Babina	
2019	Mithila Makhaan	Kranti	Maithili film
2019	Batla House	Adil Ameen	
2019	Purush	Siddharth	
2022	Samrat Prithviraj	Hada Hammir	
2023	Bindiya	Babu Yadav	

=== Television ===
Year	Title	Role	Notes
2015	Stories by Rabindranath Tagore	Bhupati Babu	
2018	Swami Ramdev - Ek Sangharsh	Swami Ramdev	

=== Web series ===
Year	Title	Role	Notes
2020–2022-2026	Raktanchal	Vijay Singh	
2026	Sankalp	Kasturi	
