= Swami Ramdev - Ek Sangharsh =

2018 Indian biopic television series

- Also known as: Swami Baba Ramdev: The Untold Story
- Directed by: Kushal Jhaveri
- Starring: Kranti Prakash Jha; Naman Jain
- Country of origin: India
- Original language: Hindi
- No. of seasons: 1

Production
- Producer: Ajay Devgn
- Production companies: Ajay Devgn FFilms; Watergate Production

Original release
- Network: Discovery Jeet
- Release: 12 February – 1 May 2018

Swami Ramdev - Ek Sangharsh is an Indian biopic television series based on the life on Swami Ramdev. It is produced by Ajay Devgn FFilm Productions and Watergate Productions. It premiered on 12 February 2018 on Discovery Jeet. The show launched on Netflix with the title Swami Baba Ramdev: The Untold Story.

== Cast ==
- Kranti Prakash Jha as Swami Ramdev
- Naman Jain as Young Swami Ramdev
- Deepal Joshi as Acharya Balkrishna
- Sadhil Kapoor as Young Balkrishna
- Tej Sapru as Gowardhan Maharaj
- Shriswara as Gulabo Devi
- Mahesh Balraj as Ram Niwas Yadav
- Darshan Gurjar as Devdutt
- Dadhi Pandey as Principal Bharadwaj
- Ankit Verma as Collector
- Jitendra Bohara as Acharya Mohan
- Trishna Singh as Swami Ramdev's Aunt
- Amit Bhardwaj as Bhanu
