= Cameron Gharaee =

American actor

Cameron Gharaee is an American actor known for his role as Ahmed Al-Fayeed on the FX series Tyrant. In 2013, he portrayed the role of Stillman Frank in a multi-episode arc of the HBO series The Newsroom.

== Early life ==
Gharaee was raised in Brandon, Mississippi, a suburb of Jackson, to parents of Iranian and Native American descent. He received a full scholarship to attend Mississippi College, but dropped out at age 19 to pursue his acting career.

== Filmography ==
=== Television ===
Year	Title	Role	Notes
2013	The Newsroom	Stillman Frank	3 episodes
2014–15	Tyrant	Ahmed Al-Fayeed	
2017	Timeless	Al Capone	Episode: "Public Enemy No. 1"
2019	Lucifer	Tiko	Episode: "Somebody's Been Reading Dante's Inferno"
