= Never Back Down: No Surrender =

2016 film by Michael Jai White

- Film poster
- Directed by: Michael Jai White
- Screenplay by: Chris Hauty
- Story by: Michael Jai White; Chris Hauty
- Based on: Characters by Chris Hauty
- Produced by: Craig Baumgarten; David Zelon
- Starring: Michael Jai White; Josh Barnett; Esai Morales
- Cinematography: Ross W. Clarkson
- Edited by: Scott Richter
- Music by: Frederik Wiedmann
- Production companies: Destination Films; Mandalay Pictures; BMP, Inc.
- Distributed by: Sony Pictures Home Entertainment
- Release date: June 7, 2016
- Running time: 102 minutes
- Country: United States
- Language: English

Never Back Down: No Surrender (also known as Never Back Down 3 or The Fighters 3: No Surrender in some markets), is a 2016 American martial arts film, directed by Michael Jai White, from a script by Chris Hauty, based on an original story co-written by Hauty and Jai White. It is the sequel to Never Back Down 2: The Beatdown (2011), and the third overall installment in the Never Back Down film series. The plot picks up two years after the events of the second film, with the former MMA champion Case Walker is on the comeback trail to become champion once again. Produced by Craig Baumgarten and starring Jai White, Josh Barnett, Gillian White, Steven Quardos, Nathan Jones and Esai Morales. The movie was released on DVD on June 7, 2016.

== Plot ==
It has been two years since Case Walker has re-entered the world of professional mixed martial arts fighting, but had grown tired of it. He now competes in amateur bouts in an effort to teach his opponents how to utilize their skills. After such a match in Beaumont, Texas, Case runs into Brody James, an old friend who is also an MMA fighter. Brody has signed with PFC Combat, a promotion run by Hugo Vega, in which Brody has signed to fight the 7-foot beast Caesar Braga for the PFC Championship in Bangkok. Brody asks Case to help him train for the fight, knowing Case needs to find his way back as well as attempt to help Brody go on the straight and narrow. Case reluctantly accepts Brody's offer and travels to Thailand.

Case goes to the Top Fight Gym, where he already finds resistance from Brody's other trainer Matty Ramos. To make matters worse, Case is ridiculed for his training by "Cobra" O'Connor, a younger fighter whose arrogance gets the best of him. During a challenge, Case parries Cobra's moves and uses Kyokushin Karate techniques to knock Cobra out. Case soon finds himself becoming a mentor to two up-and-coming fighters, Taj and "Creech". Case's pummeling of Cobra attracts the attention of Vega, who is revealed to have some sort of history with Case. PFC marketing director Myca Cruz begins to have a liking to Case and asks him on a date to get to know him, to which he agrees.

When Case has his date with Myca, Matty watches the two together and decides to use it against Case when it comes to Brody. Brody has been slowing down his training and Vega, in an effort to make the fight a success, recommends that Brody use steroids from his supplier to help him better himself. Matty tells Brody of Myca and Case, in which their date ends abruptly when Myca brings up Case's time in prison, making him feel very uncomfortable. When Brody offers to spar with Case, the session gets out of hand as Brody goes too far, hitting Case in the head, to which he retaliates in a way he never expected. Despite apologizing to Brody, their friendship seems to have ended. That is until Case notices Brody using steroids. After training one night, Case and Brody go out to eat. It is then when Brody realizes his mistakes and apologizes. He vows to Case he will do things the right way and even tells Case that Myca would be a good woman for him. Brody and Case work together to begin training for the fight along with Matty, who thanks to an intervention from Brody, agrees to work with Case in training Brody for the title fight. However, viral footage of Case beating up the racist policemen from two years prior has grabbed the attention of many, thus causing Vega to realize that Brody may not be the one worthy of the fight against Braga.

During training, a Sambo wrestler named Boris injures Brody's knee. Case reveals that he had secretly replaced Brody's steroids with baby aspirin and other placebo drugs. Vega offers Case a million dollars to fight Braga. Beginning to train for the fight under the mentorship of Brody and physical training from Matty, Taj confronts Case, accusing him of "selling out". The next day, Case's suspicions are confirmed as he breaks into Boris's locker and discovering a text message telling Vega "It's done". Case knows that he is forced to fight, but must find a way to stop both Braga and Vega, who is set to make a lot of money off the fight and prove that he is responsible for Brody's injury.

At the night of the fight, Myca, who has become Case's girlfriend, tells Vega she quits. Case realizes how he can stop Vega and starts a fight with Braga outside the ring. When Braga gets the best of Case, Case resorts to using Kyokushin again, this time using a Nakadaka Ken (Extended middle knuckle punch) that damages Braga's ribs. Case continues using traditional karate techniques and knocks Braga out with a Kaiten Geri (Rolling Wheel Kick) to his head. Vega threatens to sue, but Case tells Vega that they have the proof of him causing Brody's injury and that suing could cost Vega millions of dollars. To make matters worse, Vega must pay back everyone who came to see the fight, to which he storms off in anger, knowing he has been defeated. Case, Myca, Brody, and their crew leave the ring arena knowing they have achieved victory.

== Cast ==
- Michael Jai White as Casey "Case" Walker Jr.
- Josh Barnett as Brody James
- Gillian White as Myca Cruz
- Esai Morales as Hugo Vega
- Tyler Randell as David Barrett
- Stephen Quadros as Matty Ramos
- Amarin Cholvibul as Taj Mahale
- Daniel Renalds as "Creech"
- Owen O'Brien as "Cobra" O'Connar
- Nathan Jones as Caesar Braga
- Jeeja Yanin as Jeeja
- Sahajak Bonthanakit as Joe Kanarot
- Lauren Fornazieri as Brittany
- Nihala Waters as Morgan Cruz
- Brahim Achabbakhe as Brody's Young Fighter
- Logan Brumfield as Boris
- Tony Jaa as Himself
- Rampage Jackson as Himself
- Michael Schiavello as Himself

Ron Smoorenburg appears uncredited as Case's first opponent. Evan Peters appears as Max Cooperman in a flashback scene from Never Back Down 2: The Beatdown.

== Production ==
Filming started in Thailand in June 2015.

== Sequel ==
A standalone sequel titled Never Back Down: Revolt, was released on November 16, 2021. Kellie Madison directed the film and a new cast includes Olivia Popica, Michael Bisping, Brooke Johnston, Vanessa Campos, Diana Hoyos, Neetu Chandra and James Faulkner.
