= Tyrant (TV series) =

American TV series

- Genre: Political drama; Family drama
- Created by: Gideon Raff
- Developed by: Howard Gordon; Craig Wright
- Starring: Adam Rayner; Jennifer Finnigan; Ashraf Barhom; Fares Fares; Moran Atias; Noah Silver; Anne Winters; Salim Daw; Mehdi Dehbi; Alice Krige; Justin Kirk; Chris Noth; Melia Kreiling
- Composers: Mychael Danna; Jeff Danna
- Country of origin: United States
- Original language: English
- No. of seasons: 3
- No. of episodes: 32 (list of episodes)

Production
- Executive producers: Howard Gordon; Gideon Raff; Hugh Fitzpatrick; Glenn Gordon Caron; Christopher Keyser; Avi Nir; David Fury; Michael Lehmann; Peter Noah; Ken Horton; Craig Wright; David Yates; Ang Lee
- Producers: Pavlina Hatoupis; Gergo Balika; Howard Ellis; Adam Goodman; Lahav Doron; Dennis Hammer; Khadija Alami; Caglar Ercan; Evrim Sanal; Mustafa Uslu; Ignacio R. de Medina; Ronald M. Bozman; Avraham Karpick
- Cinematography: Attila Szalay; Itai Ne'eman; Abraham Karpick; Chris Seager
- Editors: Sang Han; Garret Donnelly; Don Broida; Gerald Valdez; Sondra Watanabe; Jordan Goldmann; Matt Chessé; Tanya M. Swerling
- Camera setup: Single-camera
- Running time: 43-55 minutes
- Production companies: Teakwood Lane Productions; Keshet Broadcasting; FXP (Note: Credited as FX Productions for first two seasons); Fox 21 Television Studios (Note: Credited as Fox 21 for season one)

Original release
- Network: FX
- Release: June 24, 2014 – September 7, 2016

Tyrant is an American political drama television series created by director and writer Gideon Raff and developed by Howard Gordon and Craig Wright. The first season of Tyrant consisting of 10 episodes premiered on American cable network FX on June 24, 2014, and ended on August 26, 2014. Subsequently, FX then went on to renew Tyrant for a second season which premiered on June 16, 2015, and ended on September 1, 2015. On October 8, 2015, the network renewed the series for a third season, which premiered on July 6, 2016. On September 7, 2016, FX announced it had cancelled the series after three seasons.

== Premise ==
Bassam "Barry" Al-Fayeed, the younger of two sons of an infamous Middle-Eastern tyrant, has been running from his past for 20 years. Now a pediatrician living in the United States, he has an American wife, son and daughter, and no desire to revisit his familial origins. However, when he is reluctantly compelled to return to his home country (the fictional Abuddin) for his nephew's wedding, he is quickly drawn into a taut political crisis when his father dies in the midst of a growing popular revolution against the ruling family. Bassam must now attempt to use his influence to guide the new president, his brutal and unstable older brother Jamal, to a political solution that will avert a bloody conflict.

== Cast ==
=== Main ===
- Adam Rayner as Bassam "Barry" Al-Fayeed (Khalil in seclusion): the second son of Khaled Al-Fayeed, the long-term dictator of Abuddin, and Amira Al-Fayeed. He has been in self-imposed exile in Pasadena, working as a pediatrician.
- Jennifer Finnigan as Molly Al-Fayeed: Barry's wife.
- Ashraf Barhom as Jamal Al-Fayeed: Barry's older brother who takes over the presidency of Abuddin upon his father's death.
- Fares Fares as Fauzi Nadal (season 1; special guest seasons 2–3): freedom-fighting reporter and Barry's childhood friend.
- Moran Atias as Leila Al-Fayeed: Jamal's wife.
- Noah Silver as Sami Al-Fayeed: Barry's and Molly's son, who is gay.
- Anne Winters as Emma Al-Fayeed (season 1; special guest seasons 2–3): Barry and Molly's daughter.
- Salim Daw as Yussef (season 1): the longtime top political advisor to the President of Abuddin. He is in this position under both Khaled and Jamal's presidencies.
- Mehdi Dehbi as Abdul (season 1): a young man from Abuddin who works as a security officer for the Al-Fayeed family.
- Alice Krige as Amira Al-Fayeed (seasons 1–2): the matriarch of the Al-Fayeed clan (Jamal and Barry's mother).
- Justin Kirk as John Tucker (season 1): a U.S. diplomat assigned to the embassy in Abuddin.
- Alexander Karim as Ihab Rashid (seasons 2–3; recurring season 1): Sheik Rashid's son and the current resistance leader who has his own aspirations to take over the government.
- Cameron Gharaee as Ahmed Al-Fayeed (seasons 2–3; recurring season 1): Jamal's and Leila's son, and next in line for leadership after Jamal. He is later revealed to be Barry's son.
- Sibylla Deen as Nusrat Al-Fayeed (season 2; recurring seasons 1, 3): Ahmed's bride.
- Melia Kreiling as Daliyah Al-Yazbek (season 3; recurring season 2): Ahmos Al-Yazbek's younger wife.
- Chris Noth as General William Cogswell (season 3): a US military leader brought in to ensure American interests in the Middle East are protected under Barry's presidency.

=== Recurring ===
- Nasser Faris as Khaled Al-Fayeed: the President of Abuddin prior to Jamal. Is Jamal and Barry's father, and is married to Amira.
- Mor Polanuer as Samira Nadal: Fauzi Nadal's 20-year-old daughter, a Muslim girl in active opposition to the Al-Fayeed family, who fights bravely for the principles in which she believes.
- Raad Rawi as General Tariq Al-Fayeed: Khaled's brother, the top military leader of Abuddin.
- Mohammad Bakri as Sheik Rashid: the exiled former resistance leader.
- Wrenn Schmidt as Jenna Olson: Molly's younger sister, who suddenly appears in Abuddin and surprises Molly and her family. A free-spirited young woman whose reckless ways are usually met with disapproval from Molly and Barry.
- Leslie Hope as Lea Exley: an employee of the U.S. Embassy.
- Jake Weber as Jimmy Timmons: a lawyer.
- Peter Polycarpou as Mahmoud Al-Ghazi: a Colonel in the Abuddin military under Jamal's presidency.
- Nathan Clarke as Munir Al-Yazbek: one of Ahmos' sons.
- Armin Karima as Kasim Al-Yazbek: one of Ahmos' sons.
- Keon Alexander as Rami Said: a General in the Abuddinian military.
- Olivia Popica as Halima: a young, outspoken student activist.
- Adam El Hagar as Siddiq: Governor of Ma'an province.
- Ariyon Bakare as Solomon: an African military leader.
- Khaled Abol Naga as Hussein Al-Qadi: a cleric.
- Annet Mahendru as Nafisa Al-Qadi: Al-Qadi's wife.
- Joseph Long as Abd Aziz: a trusted head in the palace.

== Episodes ==
Season	Episodes	Originally released	
Season	Episodes	First released	Last released
1	10	June 24, 2014	August 26, 2014
2	12	June 16, 2015	September 1, 2015
3	10	July 6, 2016	September 7, 2016

== Production ==
While the show was filmed throughout many cities in Israel (such as Kfar Saba, Petach Tikva, and Tel Aviv) and Morocco, because of the 2014 Gaza War, Operation Protective Edge launched by Israel against Hamas and the Gaza Strip, FX moved its production from Israel to Istanbul, Turkey in 2014. The fictional Arab country of "Abuddin" is deliberately compiled out of mixed elements of a few different actual countries, in order to not appear to simulate a particular nation or situation. The producers of the series have also said that no particular sects or clans will be named while relating details. Executive producer Howard Gordon stated, "We do want to stay away from reality and yet hew to it as long as it sort of feels emotionally correct and culturally correct. I think we’re going to try to stay away from names as much as possible."

The first television promos appeared in April 2014, featuring an excerpt of the song "Wave" from the album Morning Phase by Beck.

Season 3 episodes were also filmed in Budapest, Hungary (June 2016).

== Reception ==
Tyrant has received mixed reviews. On Metacritic, the show holds a score of 54 out of 100 (78 out of 100 for the user review base on 150 critics), based on 33 critics, indicating "mixed or average reviews". On Rotten Tomatoes, the show has a rating of 60%, based on 47 reviews, with an above average score of 6.2 out of 10. The consensus on the site reads: "Realizing a uniquely vital representation of life in the Middle East, Tyrant mostly thrives as a biting family drama set against immersive scenery".

The pilot episode had been criticized by some for Adam Rayner's lackluster performance, the show's depiction of the Middle East, and for being boring – others have said it is a nuanced performance in an understandably complicated role. Alan Sepinwall at HitFix labeled the show "messy", and criticized Adam Rayner's performance as Barry: "Rayner is so bland, so lacking in charisma in the role – Barry is by nature, a quieter, more reserved character, but there are ways to play silence that aren't remotely this dull – that it's baffling that Gordon and company would go to the trouble and risk the justifiable anger over the casting."

Some reviews were more positive. Melissa Maerz at Entertainment Weekly gave the show a B−, enjoying it, but admitting that the show could use some work: "With so much attention focused on this American series set in the Middle East, Tyrant is already an important show. Now it just has to prove that it's also a good one." At The Arizona Republic, Randy Cordova wrote that the first season "was one of the most overheated programs on TV, in the best sense of the word." He also praised Barhom's work, saying the actor overshadowed Rayner: "Through his layered performance, Barhom brings a smoldering intensity to the role and practically drips with testosterone," Cordova writes.

The show's depiction of Jamal al-Fayeed as a rapist was also criticized. Maureen Ryan at The Huffington Post accused the show of using Jamal's sexual assaults to add "edge" and "atmosphere" to the show: "The women in these scenes are devices—they are there to create an atmosphere of danger or to move the plot along." The A.V. Club's Emily VanDerWerff also agreed that the sexual assaults were used as plot devices: "The pilot is far too cavalier about throwing around sexual assault as a plot point, even if it's trying to make a point about women's rights in Middle Eastern nations." She added that the scenes "leave a bad taste in the mouth".

=== Ratings ===
Tyrant : U.S. viewers per episode (millions)

Season	Episode number												Average
Season	1	2	3	4	5	6	7	8	9	10	11	12	Average
1	2.10	1.39	1.71	1.57	1.50	1.43	1.34	1.53	1.45	1.52	–		1.55
2	1.06	1.15	1.10	1.24	1.16	1.08	1.20	1.13	1.35	1.20	1.23	1.25	1.18
3	1.04	0.71	0.74	0.78	0.83	0.77	0.62	0.81	0.83	0.72	–		0.78

Audience measurement performed by Nielsen Media Research

== Home media ==
On January 13, 2015, Fox Home Entertainment released the first season of Tyrant on DVD. As of June 14, 2016, the 2nd season on DVD is available for purchase on Amazon, but is manufactured on demand. The third and final season was released on DVD on August 8, 2017.

As of September 24, 2020, the series is available for streaming on Hulu.
