= Te la dedico =

Colombian telenovela

- Genre: Telenovela
- Created by: Juan Andrés Granados
- Written by: Paola Andrea Arias; Fernán Mauricio Rivera; Liliana Guzmán; Ana Fernanda Martínez; Jorge Elkin Ospina; Juan Carlos Troncoso
- Directed by: Mauricio Cruz; Víctor Cantillo
- Starring: Pipe Bueno; Diana Hoyos
- Opening theme: "Perdón si te fallé" by Pipe Bueno & Diana Hoyos
- Country of origin: Colombia
- Original language: Spanish
- No. of seasons: 1
- No. of episodes: 107

Production
- Executive producer: Ana María Pérez
- Production company: RCN Televisión

Original release
- Network: Canal RCN; HBO Max
- Release: 8 February – 15 July 2022

Te la dedico (English: This One's for You) is a Colombian telenovela created by Juan Andrés Granados for RCN Televisión. It aired on Canal RCN from 8 February 2022 to 15 July 2022. And it is available from the same day in day-and-date mode in Latin America on HBO Max. The series stars Pipe Bueno and Diana Hoyos as Wilson Barrera and Adriana Osorio, musicians who dream of becoming big music stars.

== Plot ==
Since they were young, Wilson (Pipe Bueno) and Adriana (Diana Hoyos) have had the illusion of being great artists, but different circumstances have kept them away from their dreams. Wilson, who comes from a humble family, is told by his mother to not be a dreamer, since the world of stage was not for them. Meanwhile, Rosa (Marcela Gallego), Adriana's mother, belittles her daughter's talent, and criticizes her for wanting to dedicate herself to music, going as far as kicking Adriana out of her home, so that she can continue to pursue her dreams far away from her. With these bumps in the road, Wilson and Adriana will cling to any opportunity that comes their way. Henry (Andrés Suárez) and La Mona (Valerie Domínguez) will come into their lives, to open the doors of a world unknown to them until now.

== Cast ==
- Pipe Bueno as Wilson Barrera
- Diana Hoyos as Adriana Osorio
- Luna Baxter as Claudia Silva
- Andrés Suárez as Henry Bedoya
- Valerie Domínguez as Zuly Robayo "La Mona"
- César Mora as Libardo Piñeres
- Juliana Velásquez as Manuela Cabrales
- Laura Junco as Mónica
- Rafael Zea as Bernardo
- Juan Pablo Barragán as Javier
- Marcela Gallego as Rosa
- Álvaro Bayona as Alfredo
- Paola Moreno as Luisa
- Caterin Escobar as La Chirris
- Juanita Molina as Brenda

== Production ==
The series was announced on 2 December 2021 as part of RCN Televisión's programming for 2022. Filming began on 14 December 2021 and concluded on 30 April 2022.

== Ratings ==
| Season | Episodes | First aired | | Last aired | | Avg. viewers (in points) |
| Season | Episodes | Date | Viewers (in points) | Date | Viewers (in points) | Avg. viewers (in points) |
|---|---|---|---|---|---|---|
| 1 | 107 | 8 February 2022 | 5.2 | 15 July 2022 | 3.9 | 3.3 |

== Episodes ==
| No. | Title | Original release date | Colombia viewers (Rating points) |
|---|---|---|---|
| 1 | "La vida le pone obstáculos al amor de Wilson y Adriana" | 8 February 2022 | 5.2 |
| 2 | "Adriana y Wilson tienen su primera noche romántica" | 9 February 2022 | 4.8 |
| 3 | "Adriana y Wilson se enteran de una bella noticia" | 10 February 2022 | 3.8 |
| 4 | "El papá de Adriana vuelve a hablar con ella" | 11 February 2022 | 4.1 |
| 5 | "Adriana y Wilson pelean por culpa de Henry" | 14 February 2022 | 4.2 |
| 6 | "Claudia persigue a Henry y Adriana" | 15 February 2022 | 4.1 |
| 7 | "Alfredo le da un ultimátum a Rosa" | 16 February 2022 | 3.9 |
| 8 | "Wilson se mete en problemas por ayudar a Bernardo" | 17 February 2022 | 4.6 |
| 9 | "Adriana no asiste a la cita con Wilson" | 18 February 2022 | 3.7 |
| 10 | "Wilson decide ser mariachi" | 21 February 2022 | 2.6 |
| 11 | "Rosa y Alfredo evitan que Lourdes diga la verdad" | 22 February 2022 | 3.2 |
| 12 | "Claudia quiere acabar con el proyecto de Adriana" | 23 February 2022 | 4.1 |
| 13 | "Adriana se pone furiosa con Wilson" | 24 February 2022 | 4.0 |
| 14 | "Rosa le hace una importante petición a Alfredo" | 25 February 2022 | 4.0 |
| 15 | "Wilson tiene una fuerte desilusión" | 28 February 2022 | 3.1 |
| 16 | "Adriana recibe una declaración de amor" | 1 March 2022 | 3.4 |
| 17 | "Zuly encuentra al mariachi que tanto estaba buscando" | 2 March 2022 | 4.1 |
| 18 | "Wilson renuncia al grupo de mariachis" | 3 March 2022 | 3.8 |
| 19 | "Bernardo sufre una gran decepción" | 4 March 2022 | 3.5 |
| 20 | "Claudia busca arruinar los planes de Adriana" | 7 March 2022 | 3.4 |
| 21 | "Adriana y Wilson tienen una fuerte pérdida" | 8 March 2022 | 3.7 |
| 22 | "Zuly vuelve a buscar a Wilson" | 9 March 2022 | 2.9 |
| 23 | "Wilson hace su audición en discos Piñeres" | 10 March 2022 | 3.9 |
| 24 | "Wilson y Adriana acaban su relación" | 11 March 2022 | 3.6 |
| 25 | "Claudia se entera que Adriana está en el apartamento de Henry" | 14 March 2022 | 3.3 |
| 26 | "Wilson y Zuly ahogan sus penas juntos" | 15 March 2022 | 3.3 |
| 27 | "Wilson rechaza propuesta de La Mona" | 16 March 2022 | 3.3 |
| 28 | "Adriana tiene su primer gran concierto" | 17 March 2022 | 3.6 |
| 29 | "Wilson le pide perdón a Adriana" | 18 March 2022 | 3.5 |
| 30 | "Adriana lanza su primer disco" | 22 March 2022 | 3.5 |
| 31 | "Mónica cuenta toda la verdad" | 23 March 2022 | 3.3 |
| 32 | "Adriana se entera de que su papá está vivo" | 24 March 2022 | 3.4 |
| 33 | "Raúl chantajea a Mónica" | 25 March 2022 | 3.5 |
| 34 | "Javier vende las canciones de Wilson" | 28 March 2022 | 2.6 |
| 35 | "Bernardo trata de rescatar a Mónica" | 29 March 2022 | 2.5 |
| 36 | "Zuly le pide a Libardo que convenza a Wilson de grabar el disco" | 30 March 2022 | 3.4 |
| 37 | "Henry y Adriana pasan una entretenida noche" | 31 March 2022 | 3.1 |
| 38 | "Javier incursiona como modelo webcam" | 1 April 2022 | 3.4 |
| 39 | "Adriana graba la canción de Wilson" | 4 April 2022 | 2.9 |
| 40 | "Wilson no quiere que Adriana interprete su canción" | 5 April 2022 | 3.7 |
| 41 | "Juan Darío se entera de la relación amorosa de su papá con Santiago" | 6 April 2022 | 3.5 |
| 42 | "Wilson acepta grabar un disco con Piñeres" | 7 April 2022 | 3.0 |
| 43 | "Henry le pide una oportunidad a Adriana" | 8 April 2022 | 3.1 |
| 44 | "Adriana perdona a Alfredo y le dice papá por primera vez" | 11 April 2022 | 2.9 |
| 45 | "Adriana y Henry se dan una oportunidad en el amor" | 12 April 2022 | 2.9 |
| 46 | "Claudia y Wilson se enteran de la relación entre Adriana y Henry" | 13 April 2022 | 2.7 |
| 47 | "Adriana y Wilson inician las grabaciones de sus discos" | 18 April 2022 | 3.0 |
| 48 | "Wilson le ofrece su apoyo a Zuly" | 19 April 2022 | 2.8 |
| 49 | "Rosa acepta que fue estafada y perdió todo" | 20 April 2022 | 3.0 |
| 50 | "Wilson y Adriana celebran el lanzamiento de sus discos" | 21 April 2022 | 2.8 |
| 51 | "Las canciones de Adriana y Wilson son un éxito" | 22 April 2022 | 3.3 |
| 52 | "Mónica está embarazada de Raúl" | 25 April 2022 | 3.1 |
| 53 | "Wilson besa nuevamente a Adriana" | 26 April 2022 | 3.1 |
| 54 | "Henry y Adriana no logran su gran noche" | 27 April 2022 | 3.0 |
| 55 | "Zuly se entera del beso entre Wilson y Adriana" | 28 April 2022 | 2.4 |
| 56 | "Adriana y Wilson enamoran al cantar juntos" | 29 April 2022 | 3.6 |
| 57 | "Claudia empieza a sospechar sobre la sexualidad de Henry" | 2 May 2022 | 2.9 |
| 58 | "Claudia le pide a Henry que confiese su gusto por los hombres" | 3 May 2022 | 2.6 |
| 59 | "Adriana acepta casarse con Henry" | 4 May 2022 | 3.1 |
| 60 | "Wilson recuerda su niñez con Adriana" | 5 May 2022 | 2.6 |
| 61 | "Adriana celebra su despedida de soltera" | 6 May 2022 | 3.1 |
| 62 | "Adriana y Wilson disfrutan de sus nuevos amores" | 9 May 2022 | 2.9 |
| 63 | "Alfredo es llevado de urgencias al hospital" | 10 May 2022 | 2.3 |
| 64 | "Adriana compra el apartamento donde vive Wilson" | 11 May 2022 | 2.4 |
| 65 | "Lourdes cita a Adriana y Wilson en el apartamento" | 12 May 2022 | 2.2 |
| 66 | "Adriana y Henry ya tienen padrinos de matrimonio" | 13 May 2022 | 3.1 |
| 67 | "Adriana adelanta su fecha de matrimonio" | 16 May 2022 | 2.2 |
| 68 | "Adriana busca a Wilson antes de su matrimonio" | 17 May 2022 | 2.6 |
| 69 | "Wilson interrumpe el matrimonio de Adriana" | 18 May 2022 | 3.2 |
| 70 | "Wilson y La Mona terminan su relación" | 19 May 2022 | 2.7 |
| 71 | "Humillada, Adriana rechaza una canción de Wilson" | 20 May 2022 | 3.2 |
| 72 | "Wilson y Adriana juntos, pero no revueltos" | 23 May 2022 | 2.4 |
| 73 | "Tras alocada fiesta Wilson sufre una golpiza" | 24 May 2022 | 2.9 |
| 74 | "Wilson arriesga su vida por Adriana" | 25 May 2022 | 2.9 |
| 75 | "Adriana y Wilson se besan en el escenario" | 26 May 2022 | 2.9 |
| 76 | "Los papás de Adriana volverán a separarse" | 27 May 2022 | 3.0 |
| 77 | "El radical cambio de vida de Brenda" | 31 May 2022 | 3.1 |
| 78 | "Bernardo pide perdón a Mónica y ella lo besa" | 1 June 2022 | 2.9 |
| 79 | "Adriana acepta que Juan Darío viva con ella y Henry" | 2 June 2022 | 2.7 |
| 80 | "Wilson le canta a La Mona en concierto con Adriana" | 3 June 2022 | 3.4 |
| 81 | "Adriana le hace un celoso reclamo a Wilson" | 6 June 2022 | 2.9 |
| 82 | "Wilson y La Mona formalizan su relación" | 7 June 2022 | 2.7 |
| 83 | "La Mona conoce al novio de Manuela" | 8 June 2022 | 3.0 |
| 84 | "Bernardo y Mónica dan rienda suelta a su amor" | 9 June 2022 | 3.3 |
| 85 | "Brenda le pide a Javier que termine con Luisa" | 10 June 2022 | 3.1 |
| 86 | "Atentan contra La Mona y hieren a La Chirris" | 13 June 2022 | 4.1 |
| 87 | "La Mona y Manuela lloran la muerte de La Chirris" | 14 June 2022 | 3.1 |
| 88 | "Adriana confirma que está embarazada" | 15 June 2022 | 2.8 |
| 89 | "La Mona descubre quién atentó en su contra" | 16 June 2022 | 3.4 |
| 90 | "La Mona le da un inesperado regalo a Gustavo" | 17 June 2022 | 3.2 |
| 91 | "Javier descubre que Henry es infiel" | 21 June 2022 | 3.6 |
| 92 | "Adriana descubre que Henry miente" | 22 June 2022 | 3.6 |
| 93 | "Javier rechaza una última oportunidad con Brenda" | 23 June 2022 | 3.8 |
| 94 | "La Mona confiesa cómo averiguó la verdad de La Chirris" | 24 June 2022 | 3.4 |
| 95 | "Adriana descubre una terrible infidelidad" | 28 June 2022 | 3.6 |
| 96 | "Henry ruega que Adriana no revele su verdad" | 29 June 2022 | 3.3 |
| 97 | "Wilson se entera de que Henry fue infiel" | 30 June 2022 | 3.3 |
| 98 | "Adriana tiene un apasionado encuentro con Wilson" | 1 July 2022 | 3.5 |
| 99 | "La mona enfrenta a Adriana" | 5 July 2022 | 3.8 |
| 100 | "Henry recibe el desprecio de su hijo" | 6 July 2022 | 3.7 |
| 101 | "La venganza de la mona" | 7 July 2022 | 3.4 |
| 102 | "Bernardo no puede salir de la clínica" | 8 July 2022 | 3.3 |
| 103 | "La Mona compra los contratos de Adriana y Wilson" | 11 July 2022 | 3.7 |
| 104 | "La Policía captura a Wilson" | 12 July 2022 | 3.2 |
| 105 | "Ordenan un atentado contra La Mona" | 13 July 2022 | 3.6 |
| 106 | "Confirman la muerte de La Mona" | 14 July 2022 | 3.9 |
| 107 | "Wilson y Adriana se reconcilian" | 15 July 2022 | 3.9 |

=== Special ===
| No. | Title | Original release date | Colombia viewers (Rating points) |
|---|---|---|---|
| 1 | "Te la dedico: El concierto" | 7 February 2022 | 3.6 |

== Music ==
=== Volume 1 ===
Te La Dedico (Música original de la novela)

Soundtrack album by Pipe Bueno and Diana Hoyos
- Released: 28 January 2022
- Length: 29:27

Singles from Te La Dedico (Música original de la novela)
- 1. "Perdón Si Te Fallé" Released: 21 January 2022

The first soundtrack of the telenovela was released on 28 January 2022.

| No. | Title | Artist(s) | Length |
|---|---|---|---|
| 1. | "Perdón Si Te Fallé" | Pipe Bueno and Diana Hoyos | 3:28 |
| 2. | "Esta Maldita Traga" | Pipe Bueno and Diana Hoyos | 2:54 |
| 3. | "No La Volveré A Ver" | Pipe Bueno | 3:18 |
| 4. | "Trabajo Duro" | Pipe Bueno | 2:29 |
| 5. | "Mis Padres" | Pipe Bueno | 2:49 |
| 6. | "Eternas Lágrimas" | Diana Hoyos | 3:09 |
| 7. | "La Luna Que Tú Miras" | Pipe Bueno and Diana Hoyos | 2:44 |
| 8. | "Quédate Cerca" | Diana Hoyos | 3:10 |
| 9. | "Perdón Si Te Fallé - (Pipe Bueno)" | Pipe Bueno | 3:07 |
| 10. | "Esta Maldita Traga - (Pipe Bueno)" | Pipe Bueno | 2:34 |
| Total length: | | | 29:27 |

=== Volume 2 ===
Te La Dedico (Música original de la novela) Parte 2

Soundtrack album by Pipe Bueno and Diana Hoyos
- Released: 28 January 2022
- Length: 32:31

The second soundtrack of the telenovela was released on 28 January 2022.

| No. | Title | Artist(s) | Length |
|---|---|---|---|
| 1. | "Que Dios Te Perdone" | Pipe Bueno and Diana Hoyos | 3:00 |
| 2. | "En Otros Brazos" | Pipe Bueno | 2:36 |
| 3. | "Ilusión Perdida" | Pipe Bueno and Diana Hoyos | 3:24 |
| 4. | "La Escobita" | Pipe Bueno and Diana Hoyos | 4:05 |
| 5. | "Lo Que Yo Más Quiero" | Diana Hoyos | 3:02 |
| 6. | "No Sabes Mentir" | Pipe Bueno | 2:48 |
| 7. | "Amor Incompleto" | Diana Hoyos | 3:58 |
| 8. | "Que Te Aproveche" | Pipe Bueno | 2:39 |
| 9. | "Un Día Nuevo" | Diana Hoyos | 3:56 |
| 10. | "Que Dios Te Perdone - (Pipe Bueno)" | Pipe Bueno | 3:00 |
| Total length: | | | 32:31 |
