= Raktanchal =

Hindi-language crime drama web series

- Promotional poster
- Genre: Crime Drama
- Written by: Sarvesh Upadhyay
- Directed by: Ritam Srivastava
- Starring: Kranti Prakash Jha; Nikitin Dheer; Chittaranjan Tripathy
- Composers: Mannan Munjal; Paresh Shah
- Country of origin: India
- Original language: Hindi
- No. of seasons: 3
- No. of episodes: 18

Production
- Executive producers: Gautam Talwar; Shalabh Verma
- Producers: Arjun Singgh Baran; Kartk D Nishandar
- Cinematography: Vijay Mishra
- Production companies: Global Sports Entertainment and Media Solutions Pvt Ltd (GSEAMS); Pinaka Studios Pvt Ltd

Original release
- Network: MX Player
- Release: 28 May 2020

Raktanchal is a Hindi-language crime drama web series directed by Ritam Srivastav for MX Player original. The story is inspired by real-life events from the 1980s of two notable mafia factions in Purvanchal, a region in east Uttar Pradesh. The series stars Kranti Prakash Jha and Nikitin Dheer along with Chittaranjan Tripathy, Vikram Kochhar, Pramod Pathak, Soundarya Sharma, Ronjini Chakraborty and Daya Shankar Pandey.

It is written by Sarvesh Upadhyay and produced by Chitra Vakil Sharma, Chandni Soni, Pradeep Gupta, Shashank Raai and Mahima Gupta under the banner of Pinaka Studios Pvt Ltd and Mahima Productions. The series premiered on 28 May 2020 on the OTT platform MX Player. The same year, Kranti Prakash Jha revealed that there will be a second season. The second season of the series premiered on 11 February 2022 on MX Player. It was produced by Arjun Singhh Baran & Kartk D Nishandar under the banner of Gseams.

The third season of the series premiered on 16 July 2026 on MX Player.

== Plot ==
Raktanchal is set in the 1980s Purvanchal and is inspired by true events. It is the story of Waseem Khan (played by Nikitin Dheer) who rules the tender mafia in Purvanchal, and is also involved in the smuggling of arms and ammunition, and Vijay Singh (played by Kranti Prakash Jha), who are constantly at loggerheads which leads to a series of bloodbaths.

Khan is challenged by the antihero Vijay Singh, who held high morals and wanted to become a civil servant until Khan's gang murdered his father Virendra Singh (played by Gyan Prakash). While Vijay is determined to avenge his father, Waseem is determined to hold on to power come what may.

== Cast ==
- Nikitin Dheer as Waseem Khan
- Kranti Prakash Jha as Vijay Singh
- Soundarya Sharma as Roli
- Ronjini Chakraborty as Seema
- Chittaranjan Tripathy as Bechan
- Ashish Vidyarthi as Ramanand Rai
- Pramod Pathak as Tripurari
- Vikram Kochhar as Sanki Pandey
- Krishna Bisht as Katta
- Basu Soni as Chhunnu
- Rajesh Dubey as Sadhu Maharaj
- Kenisha Awasthi as Bindu
- Shashi Chaturvedi as Bilal
- Pravina Bhagwat Deshpande as Sudha (Vijay's mother)
- Ravi Khanvilkar as Pujari Singh
- Prachi Prakash Kurne as Badki
- Farah Malik as Fazila
- Daya Shankar Pandey as Sahib Singh
- Bhupesh Singh as Irshad
- Sushil Kr. Srivastav as Hifazat
- Gyan Prakash as Virendra Singh (Vijay's father)
- Gurpreet Bedi as Fazila Khan
- Tanmay Ranjan as Samar Pratap

== Marketing and release ==
The web series' official trailer was launched on 24 May 2020 by MX Player on YouTube.

== Reception ==
The series received positive reviews from critics, who praised its cast's performances. Ronak Kotecha, editor-in-chief of The Times of India, gave three-and-a-half of five stating, "With powerful performances and bloody face-offs, Raktanchal has enough ammo to keep you engaged through all nine episodes."

Ruchi Kaushal of Hindustan Times said, "In this world where an eye for an eye has been making the whole world blind, stirring performances are the key. Kranti Prakash Jha plays his part well as a lanky gang leader and carries Raktanchal on his shoulder. His character reminded me of Jimmy Sheirgill's Rangbaaz Phirse for its IAS-aspirant- turned gangster story. While Jimmy's charm worked wonders in that show, Kranti also does justice to his role. Besides him, Vikram Kocchhar is one actor who brings a smile with his twisted portrayal of coal mafia."

Scroll.in's chief editor Nandini Ramanath reviewed "The leads are well cast, with each playing to their strengths.". Prathyush Parasuraman writing for Film Companion gave a mixed review and said "there is a lot of violence. And to be honest, I am quite tired of it."

In August 2020, Raktanchal crossed 100 million views on MX Player. In October 2020, Raktanchal was included in the list of Best series on MX Player, released by Indian Express.
