= Liaison (TV series) =

TV series or program

- Promotional poster
- Written by: Virginie Brac
- Directed by: Stephen Hopkins
- Starring: Vincent Cassel; Eva Green
- Composer: Walter Mair
- Countries of origin: United Kingdom; France
- Original languages: English; French
- No. of seasons: 1
- No. of episodes: 6

Production
- Executive producers: Vincent Cassel; Gub Neal; Jean-Benoît Gillig; Sarada McDermott; Justin Thomson; Stephen Hopkins; Edward Barlow
- Producers: Joanie Blaikie; Eric Jollant
- Production companies: Ringside Studios; Léonis Productions

Original release
- Network: Apple TV+
- Release: February 24 – March 31, 2023

Liaison is a British-French thriller television series written by Virginie Brac, directed by Stephen Hopkins and starring Vincent Cassel and Eva Green. It premiered on 24 February 2023 on Apple TV+.

== Premise ==
A thriller following French spies and terrorists.

== Cast ==
- Vincent Cassel as Gabriel Delage, Alison’s former lover, a mercenary for Telkis and a former French Foreign Legion and DGSE operative
- Eva Green as Alison Rowdy, Delage’s Anglo-French former lover and a Home Office Special Adviser to the Minister of Security
- Peter Mullan as Richard Banks, the Minister of State for Security
- Gérard Lanvin as Alain Dumas, the CEO of private security firm Telkis, former DGSE commander and Delage’s superior
- Daniel Francis as Albert Onwori, a human rights lawyer and Alison's current partner
- Stanislas Merhar as Didier Taraud, a senior adviser to the French President and head of an Elysee Palace taskforce set up to counter the powers of the DGSE.
- Irène Jacob as Sophie Saint-Roch, the Director of the DGSE
- Laëtitia Eïdo as Sabine Louseau, Taraud's mistress and a senior aide in the European Commission
- Eriq Ebouaney as Bob Foret, a board member of private security firm Antropa
- Patrick Kennedy as Mark Bolton OBE, CEO of the National Cyber Security Centre
- Bukky Bakray as Kim Onwori, Albert's teenage daughter
- Olivia Popica as Hobbs, a Detective Inspector in the Metropolitan Police SO15
- Patrick Malahide as Jack Rowdy, Alison’s father, a former British Army Major General and NATO Deputy Supreme Allied Commander Europe.
- Aziz Dyab as Samir Hamza, a Syrian hacker and Walid’s younger cousin
- Marco Horanieh as Walid Hamza, a Syrian hacker and Samir’s older cousin
- Lyna Dubarry as Myriam Hamza, Samir’s wife and mother of his child
- Thierry Frémont as the President of France
- Tchéky Karyo as Joseph Miller, the CEO of Antropa

== Episodes ==
No.	Title	Directed by	Written by	Original release date
1	"Storm Warning"	Stephen Hopkins	Virginie Brac	February 24, 2023
Hackers Samir and Walid Hamza request political asylum at the French Embassy in Damascus. They claim to have information about upcoming terrorist cyberattacks in Europe. Instead of using the DGSE, the French President authorises Elysee security taskforce head Didier Taraud to have them extracted by Telkis private operative Gabriel Delage. The extraction is intercepted by mercenaries, but the two escape. Delage is captured, but is released when the men realise that they previously worked together. The Hamzas enter Turkey and use French passports from Delage to fly to their uncle in the UK. In London, the National Cyber Security Centre is hacked, but with no apparent damage. Home Office Minister Richard Banks and his Anglo-French private secretary Alison Rowdy demand a full investigation. A second hack that night disables the Thames Barrier, causing extensive flooding. Walid and Samir try to contact Mark Bolton, CEO of the NCSC. Telkis head Alain Dumas relays Taraud's instructions to Delage to retrieve a USB key from the cousins. In London, he injures Walid and takes the key, but later discovers that he needs his fingerprint to unlock its encryption. Taraud becomes concerned about the key falling into British hands. In a Counter Terrorism Command briefing, Delage is identified from CCTV when he confronted Walid, and is recognised by Rowdy. Whilst the Home Office strategises on how to revoke Delage's diplomatic immunity to arrest him, Delage turns up outside Alison's house.
2	"Chaos"	Stephen Hopkins	Virginie Brac	March 3, 2023
Delage reveals to Rowdy that the Hamzas were wiping Syrian police data servers they discovered the attack intel. Rowdy's partner, lawyer Albert Onwori, is hired by Banks to help them revoke Delage's immunity. Metropolitan Police DI Hobbs tells Onwori that they believe that the Hamza's may have terrorist motivations. A third hack on Network Rail causes a train crash, injuring Onwori's daughter Kim and killing others. Delage infiltrates the hospital where Walid is recovering and tries to use this fingerprint to unlock the key. Walid later dies when the hackers poison him. Delage discovers that Samir's fingerprint, and a password, is also needed to gain access. The French President transfers control to the DGSE, concerning both Taraud and Dumas. Samir flees the UK to Dunkirk. Hobbs discovers that Delage is working for Telkis and his diplomatic cover is false. She sends to arrest Delage, who escapes and meets with Rowdy. Rowdy reluctantly agrees to help if it prevents more attacks. At a COBRA meeting, she and Banks propose signing a cybersecurity agreement with the EU. Taraud meets with Bob Foret, who has a vested interest in the deal not being signed. Taraud meets with Sabine Louseau, his former mistress who works in the European Commission, convincing her to sabotage the signing. Rowdy realises that Delage stole her phone.
3	"Manipulations"	Stephen Hopkins	Virginie Brac	March 10, 2023
Onwori asks Rowdy to marry him. Telkis track Samir's wife Myriam to Belgium, where she arrived as a refugee. Dumas instructs Delage to go to Brussels to take her, and speak with Louseau to see whether Taraud is playing both sides. Rowdy and Bolton arrive at the European Commission, but are confronted by Louseau. Bolton meets with Foret, revealed to be responsible for the attacks so his firm Antropa can secure IT contracts with the UK government. Bolton, paid to cause the NCSC hack, cuts ties when he realises his implication in UK citizens deaths. Impersonating an NGO doctor, Delage removes Myriam from the refugee camp with her son, and they escape pursued by men. Injured, he calls Rowdy for help and she checks them into a hotel. Banks calls from London, where another hack on the National Grid is taking place, and urges her to secure the cybersecurity deal. The next day, Rowdy bypasses Louseau and meets with EU Commissioner Vandermeer directly, agreeing to sign the deal at 8pm. Taraud, infuriated, demands that Louseau recuse herself from the signing. Hobbs shows Onwori CCTV from the hospital involving Rowdy and Delage. Preparing to sign the deal, Rowdy finds Bolton hanged in the toilets by the men who pursued Delage.
4	"Carnage"	Stephen Hopkins	Virginie Brac	March 17, 2023
Delage hacks Louseau's laptop webcam to Telkis. Louseau is recalled to the European Commission due to Bolton's death, and informs Taraud, who tells her to report Bolton's dealing with Antropa to the Anti-Fraud Office. Louseau confronts Rowdy, telling her she is being used, and an anti-fraud investigation into Bolton will halt the UK joining the cybersecurity deal by years. Samir calls Mariyam, she explains the situation and he reveals he is in Dunkirk. Taraud says his mission from the President is to ensure the French company Antropa signs with the UK, contrary to EU regulations. A new hack causes a plane to fly dangerously close to St. Pauls Cathedral. Banks calls Rowdy, telling her that senior government advisor Gleason has forced them into a deal with Antropa. Dumas instructs Delage to fake Samir's death to maintain their cover. Taraud meets with Foret, who confirms the UK contract has been signed, and later demands Louseau provide her work passwords to Antropa. Delage and Rowdy collect Samir and his friend Krimo from Dunkirk. They take them to the chateau of Alison’s father Jack, a retired Major General and friend of Banks. They pass off Krimo as Samir, knowing Antropa are watching via drone, and take him to a panic room. Jack is sent footage of Alison and Gabriel attending an eco-protest in 2000, where someone was killed by a Molotov cocktail, and receives a call trying to blackmail him. They reveal to him Samir is on a boat in Dunkirk. The operatives who killed Bolton arrive at the property, but Delage shoots Jack when he aims his pistol at him.
5	"Family Album"	Stephen Hopkins	Virginie Brac	March 24, 2023
Rowdy and Delage escape the operatives, and take Jack to a hospital. Realising Taraud's treachery from the webcam footage, Dumas provides it to DGSE Director Sophie Saint-Roch. The DGSE reveal to Telkis that Antropa plan to access information to enable them to target cybersecurity weaknesses of all 27 EU member states. They also note Antropa must have a mole in the UK government. Rowdy and Delage meet with their former eco-protester friends who are housing Samir and his family, who shun Alison for testifying against Delage and having him imprisoned 20 years prior. Samir opens the USB key, revealing Antropa plans to attack various countries. He reveals they approached Bolton before going to the French, but he never showed to the meeting. Rowdy and Delage meet with Dumas and Saint-Roch, who reveal that Taraud is meeting with Antropa CEO Francis Miller in London, and convince them to allow Samir to return to the UK, on the condition they provide Taraud's movements to her. Banks, not wanting to sign with Antropa, agrees to meet Rowdy and Samir when they arrive in the UK, knowing Samir can provide evidence which will stop the signing. A posthumous letter from Bolton, containing evidence of his dealings with Antropa, arrives at Rowdy's house. Onwori gives it to Banks. The full video footage shows Rowdy was responsible, albeit indirectly, for fellow activist Nathalie being burned alive at the protest. The group try to kill her, but she is saved by Delage who reveals he was an intelligence infiltrator to their group. Rowdy, Delage and the Hamzas arrive in Scotland via boat.
6	"An Eye for an Eye"	Stephen Hopkins	Virginie Brac	March 31, 2023
Rowdy, Delage and the Hamza's steal a van and drive down to London, where they stay in her house with Onwori. She tells Delage she never intended to kill Nathalie. Louseau is forced by Taraud to attend a meeting in London. Banks visits Rowdy, who tells him the DGSE have a copy of the key. Saint-Roch and Dumas meet with DI Hobbs, who plans on having CTSFO's arrest Taraud, Louseau and Miller when he arrives in the country. Concerned about her plans, Dumas and Saint-Roch instruct Delage to exfiltrate Taraud independently. Antropa CEO Joseph Miller reveals to Foret the DGSE have a copy of the key, and they can no longer sign with the British and need to liquidate and disappear in the next 24 hours, but will reform under a new name in the future and reinstate the agreement with the UK. Rowdy gets a taxi to the home office, but it is intercepted by a corrupt Protection Command officer working for Antropa, who also kidnapped Samir, and taken to their headquarters. Hobbs, Saint-Roch and Dumas see her entering, and believe Rowdy to be the mole. Delage infiltrates Antropa’s UK offices, where he discovers them removing everything. Louseau is forced to provide her EU access passwords. Samir sacrifices himself so Miryam and Louseau can escape. Rowdy and Delage are brought to Miller, but Rowdy disarms one of his men and the two escape. Delage stays behind to hold off security whilst Rowdy flees. Taraud, Foret and Miller are killed whilst escaping from London, when their helicopter explodes. Rowdy meets with Banks, who reveals he was working with Antropa, but eliminated them when they ceased serving British interests. Disgusted, she declines to continue working with him and reunites with Delage who survived the shootout.

== Production ==
=== Development ===
In June 2021, it was announced that Apple TV+ had greenlit Liaison, marking the platform's first "Anglo-French" production. Stephen Hopkins is directing, Virginie Brac is writing, and Gub Neal and Jean Benoit Gillig are executive producing. Additional executive producers include Hopkins, Sarada McDermott, Justin Thomson, and Ed Barlow, with Joanie Blaikie and Eric Jollant producing. It is co-produced by Ringside Studios and Léonis Productions.

=== Casting ===
It was announced alongside the main series announcement in June 2021 that Vincent Cassel and Eva Green would star. Also cast were British actors Peter Mullan, Daniel Francis, and Bukky Bakray and French actors Gérard Lanvin, Stanislas Merhar, Philippine Leroy-Beaulieu, Laëtitia Eïdo, Eriq Ebouaney and Thierry Frémont.

=== Filming ===
Principal photography began in London in June 2021.

== Reception ==
On the review aggregator website Rotten Tomatoes, 48% of 23 critics' reviews are positive, with an average rating of 5.2/10. The website's consensus reads: "More tedious than it is dangerous, Liaison generates some spark from Vincent Cassel and Eva Green's pairing but generally underwhelms as an anemic addition to the espionage genre." On Metacritic, which assigns a weighted average rating, the series has received an average score of 48 out of 100, based on 13 critics, indicating "mixed or average reviews".
