= Olivia Popica =

Romanian-born English actress (born 1993)

- Born: 27 October 1993 (age 32); Romania
- Education: National Youth Theatre; Identity School of Acting
- Occupation: Actress
- Years active: 2010 – present

Olivia Popica (born 27 October 1993) is a Romanian-born English actress.

On television, she is known for her roles in the FX channel political drama Tyrant (2015–2016) and the Apple TV+ thriller Liaison (2023). Her films include Never Back Down: Revolt (2021).

== Early life ==
Popica was born in Romania, but moved to London with her parents at a young age. She trained at the National Youth Theatre and the Identity School of Acting.

== Career ==
Popica's first big role came playing Halima in the political drama series Tyrant. She appeared in the action film Retribution before appearing in the drama series Informer in a recurring role.

Popica played the lead role of Anya in the mixed martial arts film Never Back Down: Revolt, alongside Michael Bisping. She made a minor appearance in the fantasy film Fantastic Beasts: The Crimes of Grindelwald as a receptionist.

Popica appeared in the comedy short film Alex's Dream, alongside Alex Lawther and Emma Corrin. She had recurring roles in the historical drama series The Tattooist of Auschwitz and the thriller series Liaison. She had a lead role in season 3 of the fantasy series The Wheel of Time.

== Filmography ==
=== Film ===
Year	Title	Role	Notes
2010	Imaginary Kittens	Olive	Short
2010	Escaping the Wing	Voice of the Girl	Short
2014	Queen of Diamonds	Teen Model	Short
2014	Glasgow Girls	Agnesa	
2014	Xmoor	Vanya	
2016	Retribution	Olivia	Short
2016	Break	Emina	Short
2016	The Devil Complex	Radio DJ 2	
2018	Fantastic Beasts: The Crimes of Grindelwald	Receptionist	
2018	Alex's Dream	Jesse	Short
2019	Grey Suits Us	Dalani	Short
2021	Never Back Down: Revolt	Anya	
2022	A Tree Fell Today	Elise	
2025	The Yellow Tie	Sonia	
2026	Cloud 99	Woman	Short

=== Television ===
Year	Title	Role	Notes
2014	DCI Banks	Angela Petri	Episode: "Wednesday's Child: Part 2"
2015	Holby City	Roza Barzani	Episode: "All About Evie"
2015-2016	Tyrant	Halima	19 episodes
2017	Riviera	Fatima	5 episodes
2017	Victoria	Catherine	Episode: "Entente Cordiale"
2018	Informer	Roxy Novac	5 episodes
2020	Caesar Wagner	Ana	Episode: "Sang et eaux"
2020-2021	The Cipher	Efrat	4 episodes
2023	Liaison	DCI Hobbs	6 episodes
2024	The Tattooist of Auschwitz	Nadya	2 episodes
2025	The Wheel of Time	Jeaine Cadie	4 episodes
