= Kariyathi =

Bhojpuri-language film

Kariyathi or Kariyatthi (trans.: The Black Girl) is a 2025 Bhojpuri-language film produced by Champaran Talkies and directed by Nitin Chandra. It is based on a Bhojpuri short story from the book Tetri by Saroj Singh and talk about Discrimination based on skin tone in Indian society. The film follows a dark-skinned tone girl, born in a conservative Brahmin family, who marries a widower. The film released on Waves OTT on 31 January 2025.

== Cast ==
- Annu Priya
- Deepak Singh
