= List of Tyrant episodes =

Tyrant is an American drama television series that premiered on the cable network FX on June 24, 2014. The series follows Bassam "Barry" Al-Fayeed, the youngest son of an infamous Middle-Eastern tyrant, who has been running from his past for 20 years. Now a pediatrician living in the United States, he has an American wife, son and daughter, and has no desire to revisit his familial origins. However, when he is reluctantly compelled to return to his home country (the fictional Abuddin) for his nephew's wedding, he is quickly drawn into a taut political crisis when his father dies in the midst of growing popular revolution against the ruling family. Bassam must now attempt to use his influence to guide the new President, his brutal and unstable older brother Jamal, to a political solution that will avert a bloody conflict.

During the course of the series, 32 episodes of Tyrant aired over three seasons.

== Series overview ==
Season	Episodes	Originally released	
Season	Episodes	First released	Last released
1	10	June 24, 2014	August 26, 2014
2	12	June 16, 2015	September 1, 2015
3	10	July 6, 2016	September 7, 2016

== Episodes ==
=== Season 1 (2014) ===
No. overall	No. in season	Title	Directed by	Written by	Original release date	Prod. code	US viewers (millions)
1	1	"Pilot"	David Yates	Gideon Raff	June 24, 2014	1WAR79	2.10
Bassam "Barry" Al Fayeed, who is married with two children and living in self-imposed exile in the United States, reluctantly returns to his home country to attend the wedding of his older brother's son. Back home he meets up with his father, the ruler and dictator of the country, and other family members. He soon experiences the brutality of the regime, especially that of his brother, who is the heir apparent.
2	2	"State of Emergency"	Michael Lehmann	Howard Gordon & Craig Wright	July 1, 2014	1WAR01	1.38
Bassam's older brother, Jamal, the newly appointed President of Abuddin, is incapacitated from an assassination attempt, so Bassam must delay returning to America. Further problems arise when his nephew's new bride is kidnapped by terrorists.
3	3	"My Brother's Keeper"	Michael Lehmann	Glenn Gordon Caron	July 8, 2014	1WAR02	1.70
Bassam's decision to stay in Abuddin receives mixed reactions. New evidence connected to Jamal's assassination attempt causes strife between the brothers.
4	4	"Sins of the Father"	Jeremy Podeswa	Peter Noah	July 15, 2014	1WAR03	1.57
The 20th anniversary of the chemical attack ordered by Bassam's father draws nearer, and Bassam must keep tensions from escalating amid heavy resistance. Meanwhile, Jamal tries to be more confident in the bedroom following his near-assassination.
5	5	"Hail Mary"	David Petrarca	Chris Levinson	July 22, 2014	1WAR04	1.50
Jamal must deal with thousands of protesters gathered in the Plaza, as Bassam hurries to ready a summit to avoid further violence.
6	6	"What the World Needs Now"	Tucker Gates	Story by : Arika Lisanne Mittmann; Teleplay by : Glenn Gordon Caron	July 29, 2014	1WAR05	1.43
Jamal meets with the rebel opposition leader, Sheik Rashid, who had come out of hiding on Bassam's request to create a peace, adding elections to the Abuddin Constitution. However, as the time to officiate the changes draws near, Jamal begins to wonder if Bassam is trying to do more than just guide him.
7	7	"Preventative Medicine"	Marcos Siega	Arika Lisanne Mittmann	August 5, 2014	1WAR06	1.34
Shortly after Jamal's attack on Sheik Rashid, he is found and is discovered to still be alive, much to Jamal's dismay, so he begs Bassam to kill Rashid before he awakens if he wants the peace to continue. While Bassam is hesitant, his mother soon reveals a long-hidden secret about the events twenty years ago, soon forcing Bassam into a tailspin trying to figure out what he believes.
8	8	"Meet the New Boss"	Charlotte Sieling	David Matthews	August 12, 2014	1WAR07	1.53
Bassam starts to fulfill his father's legacy. Realizing that his brother feels incompetent as a ruler, he hatches a secret plot with Yussef to oust Jamal so that Bassam could ideally establish Abuddin the way his father had wanted. Meanwhile, things go awry when Hakim, the critical member of the coup, refuses to get involved. Also, Bassam is in a quagmire when he tries to force his family to go back home for a week, aggravating his wife in the process.
9	9	"Gaslight"	Gwyneth Horder-Payton	Story by : Chris Levinson; Teleplay by : Peter Noah & Nadia Conners	August 19, 2014	1WAR08	1.45
Bassam's coup against his brother continues as he convinces him to imprison a family member. Meanwhile, marriages are tested as Bassam's family's date to fly back to America draws nearer.
10	10	"Gone Fishing"	Michael Lehmann	Howard Gordon & Chris Keyser	August 26, 2014	1WAR09	1.52
The planned coup suffers an early setback when Tucker reveals that the US is withdrawing their support and wants to call it off, but Bassam defiantly persists with the plan regardless. Meanwhile, while he is on a fishing trip with Jamal, Emma and Jenna are robbed and stranded whilst on a shopping trip, which interferes with the family's plans to leave Abuddin.

=== Season 2 (2015) ===
No. overall	No. in season	Title	Directed by	Written by	Original release date	Prod. code	US viewers (millions)
11	1	"Mark of Cain"	Gwyneth Horder-Payton	Howard Gordon & Chris Keyser	June 16, 2015	2WAR01	1.06
Four months after his failed coup, Bassam sits in prison as Jamal struggles to decide whether or not to execute him, while he also deals with allying with China and suppressing the resistance movement.
12	2	"Enter the Fates"	Gwyneth Horder-Payton	Glenn Gordon Caron	June 23, 2015	2WAR02	1.15
Having returned to the States, Molly struggles with the press storm and the loss of Bassam. Meanwhile, Bassam finds himself forced to navigate the desert he is stranded in and Jamal struggles to make a good impression on the Chinese.
13	3	"Faith"	Alex Zakrzewski	Chris Keyser & Howard Gordon	June 30, 2015	2WAR03	1.10
Following the resistance's attack on the press conference, Tariq launches sarin gas at a village to smoke out rebels, leaving Jamal and the Royal Family to deal with the consequences and create a cover-up. Bassam ends up in a Bedouin village (the same village as the attack) and struggles to keep his true identity a secret, while stateside, Molly continues to deal with the negotiations of Bassam's estate and discovers Sammy has a considerable inheritance.
14	4	"A House Built on Sand"	Alex Zakrzewski	Addison McQuigg & Cassie Pappas	July 7, 2015	2WAR04	1.24
Bassam adapts to his new identity and becomes involved in the life of the village; Amira introduces a highly decorated war hero to Jamal; Ihab and Samira's plans to flee the country are thwarted.
15	5	"A Viper in the Palace"	David Petrarca	Mark Richard	July 14, 2015	2WAR05	1.17
When the Army of the Caliphate arrives in Abuddin, Bassam tries to get out of the country while Jamal tries to get a strategy for fighting the Caliphate.
16	6	"The Other Brother"	Kari Skogland	David Fury	July 21, 2015	2WAR06	1.08
Bassam opts to stay in Abuddin and fight the Army of the Caliphate, which is going to increasingly brutal measures. Meanwhile, Amira tries to help Jamal improve the Army after Tariq's failure and the Chinese abandonment. Sammy goes in search of Abdul, who he learns is being held hostage.
17	7	"The Awful Grace of God"	Gwyneth Horder-Payton	Chris Keyser	July 28, 2015	2WAR07	1.20
Rami is pressured by the increasingly-erratic Jamal for a military victory against the Caliphate. Samy attempts to pay the Caliphate for Abdul's release, only to learn he is much too late. Bassam's attempt to rescue Daliyah stalls when they are caught by Samira. Meanwhile, Nusrat suffers complications in pregnancy that she believes will threaten her life.
18	8	"Fathers and Sons"	Ernest Dickerson	Cassie Pappas & Addison McQuigg	August 4, 2015	2WAR08	1.13
Realizing they cannot defeat the Caliphate alone, Bassam tries to form an alliance with the palace. Samy goes to meet the head of the Red Hand insurgency, only to learn that it is his father. Jamal's mental breakdown continues as he starts to question Rami's military guidance.
19	9	"Inside Men and Outside Women"	Andrew Bernstein	Glenn Gordon Caron	August 11, 2015	2WAR09	1.35
After meeting with Samy, Bassam calls Molly to inform her he is alive, necessitating a change of her plans to stay. Meanwhile, Rami attempts to contact the leader of the Red Hand, and as a result, Jamal begins questioning Rami's loyalties. As well, Abu Omar and Ihab interrogate one of Bassam's informants in the Caliphate in order to suppress the Red Hand.
20	10	"Zanjir"	Peter Weller	Howard Gordon & Chris Keyser	August 18, 2015	2WAR10	1.20
After an attempt to kill Rami leaves Amira dead instead, Jamal attempts to set up Rami for the failed attempt, leading to those closest to Jamal questioning his ability. Meanwhile, Bassam prepares what remains of his forces for an ambush on the Caliphate headquarters to enable the military to overrun the Caliphate.
21	11	"Desert Storm"	Ciaran Donnelly	Story by : David Fury; Teleplay by : Mark Richard & Mando Alvarado	August 25, 2015	2WAR11	1.23
Molly is forced to work with Leila to get military support to save Bassam when his forces find themselves surrounded by the Caliphate during their mission.
22	12	"Pax Abuddin"	Gwyneth Horder-Payton	Chris Keyser and Howard Gordon	September 1, 2015	2WAR12	1.25
With the Caliphate defeated, Bassam seems on his way back to his normal life. However, this is interrupted by brewing storms in the palace as Leila testifies to the Arab League about Jamal's crimes and then, rioting occurs among the people for Bassam to take his brother's place. Jamal agrees to turn himself in until new evidence shows the truth between the Arab League and Leila. As he announces his refusal to step down, he is shot by Nusrat multiple times.

=== Season 3 (2016) ===
No. overall	No. in season	Title	Directed by	Written by	Original release date	Prod. code	US viewers (millions)
23	1	"Spring"	Gwyneth Horder-Payton	Christopher Keyser	July 6, 2016	3WAR01	1.04
Now the president of Abuddin, Bassam tries to bring the country back to peace following the violence caused by the Caliphate and Jamal.
24	2	"Cockroach"	Alex Zakrzewski	Addison McQuigg	July 13, 2016	3WAR02	0.71
When Fauzi returns, Bassam is forced to admit the truth about his daughter; Ihab Rashid makes a plot for revenge against Bassam, and Samy enters a new relationship with a professor.
25	3	"The Dead and the Living"	Gwyneth Horder-Payton	Howard Gordon & Christopher Keyser	July 20, 2016	3WAR03	0.74
With help from the US Army, Bassam attempts to rescue his daughter from Ihab Rashid and the Caliphate while not letting Molly trade herself for Emma. After learning of his father's critical health, Ahmed uncovers Nusrat's diary and a dark secret from their wedding day.
26	4	"A Prayer for our Daughters"	Michael Lehmann	Emmy Grinwis	July 27, 2016	3WAR04	0.78
Reeling from Emma's death, Molly becomes suicidal as the desire for revenge results in massive civilian casualties; Leila reveals to Ahmed the truth about his parentage.
27	5	"A Rock and A Hard Place"	Deborah Chow	Anna Fishko	August 3, 2016	3WAR05	0.83
Tensions begin to flare in Abuddin as Bassam bans open prayer in an attempt to deter future terrorist attacks while Leila questions Dailyah's relationship with Bassam.
28	6	"Truth and Dignity"	Charlotte Brändström	Amy Louise Johnson & Kelly Wiles	August 10, 2016	3WAR06	0.77
Dailyah finds herself conflicted between Bassam and Fauzi, especially after an attack on the Truth and Dignity Commission; Samy accidentally reveals details of his new relationship, and al-Qadi's attempts to make peace with the Caliphate go horribly awry.
29	7	"Bedfellows"	Peter Weller	Daniel Goldfarb	August 17, 2016	3WAR07	0.62
As Bassam's mentality starts to break, Leila seeks an alliance with al-Qadi and Ihab Rashid plots an attack against Abuddin with the Caliphate.
30	8	"Ask for the Earth"	Alrick Riley	Christopher Keyser	August 24, 2016	3WAR08	0.81
As conflict escalates to war between the Caliphate and Abuddin, Bassam cracks down on his own ideas in an attempt at revenge.
31	9	"How to Live"	Peter Weller	Story by : Anna Fishko; Teleplay by : Emmy Grinwis & Addison McQuigg	August 31, 2016	3WAR09	0.83
As Fauzi, Dailyah, and Leila oppose him, Bassam resorts to cracking down on them, bringing Abuddin close to a civil war.
32	10	"Two Graves"	Gwyneth Horder-Payton	Christopher Keyser & Howard Gordon	September 7, 2016	3WAR10	0.72
As war between the Caliphate and Abuddin looms, Barry's attempt to suppress Leila's movement has unforeseen consequences.

== Ratings ==
Tyrant : U.S. viewers per episode (millions)

Season	Episode number												Average
Season	1	2	3	4	5	6	7	8	9	10	11	12	Average
1	2.10	1.39	1.71	1.57	1.50	1.43	1.34	1.53	1.45	1.52	–		1.55
2	1.06	1.15	1.10	1.24	1.16	1.08	1.20	1.13	1.35	1.20	1.23	1.25	1.18
3	1.04	0.71	0.74	0.78	0.83	0.77	0.62	0.81	0.83	0.72	–		0.78

Audience measurement performed by Nielsen Media Research
