= Aarti Puri =

Indian actress

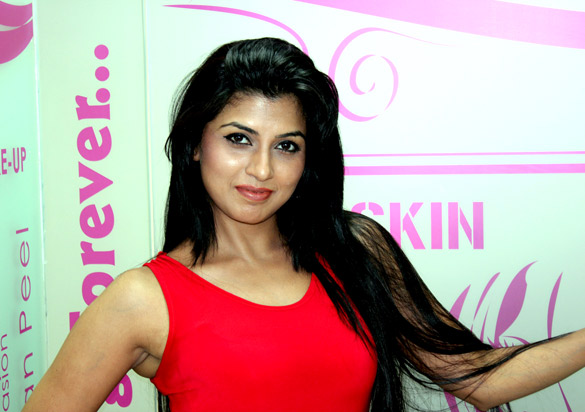
- Portrait of Aarti Puri
- Born: 8 January 1985 (age 41); Lucknow, Uttar Pradesh, India
- Occupations: Actress, Model
- Years active: 1999−Present

Aarti Puri, also known as Arti Puri, (born 8 January) is an Indian television and movie actress and model. Noted roles include the character of Trishna from show Madhubala - Ek Ishq Ek Junoon. and movies like Deswa and Once Upon a Time in Bihar.

== Career ==
Puri started her career in regional cinema and then moved on to small screen. She is a model and has also done many movies and more than 100 Punjabi videos as model as well. She was cast to play the parallel lead in the show Madhubala - Ek Ishq Ek Junoon. alongside Drashti Dhami, who plays the lead in the show. She also played a lead role opposite Rakesh Kapoor in, "Pahado Ke Daman Mein" in 1999.

=== Television ===
- 2001–2002 Ramayan as Shrutakirti
- 2011–2012 Mere Desh ki Beti as Sanjeevani
- 2012–2013 Madhubala - Ek Ishq Ek Junoon as Trishna Balraj Chaudhary

=== Filmography ===
Year	Film	Role	Language
2004	Mysteries Shaque	Simran	Hindi
2005	Nalaik		Punjabi
2008	Lakh Pardesi Hoiye		Punjabi
2010	Musaa: The Most Wanted		Hindi
2010	Dammunnodu		Telugu
2010	Khich Ghuggi Khich		Punjabi
2011	Deswa		Bhojpuri
2015	Once Upon a Time in Bihar		Hindi
2013	Ramaiya Vastavaiya	Gauri	Hindi
2014	Action Jackson		Hindi
2015	Addam lo Deyyam (telugu)		Telugu
2015	Plus One +1		Telugu
2018	MLA (2018 Telugu film)		
2024	Gabru Gang	Bulbul	Hindi
