= Mithila Makhaan =

Maithili language film

- Directed by: Nitin Chandra
- Written by: Nitin Chandra
- Produced by: Samir Kumar; Nitu Chandra; Nitin Chandra
- Starring: Kranti Prakash Jha; Anuritta Jha; Pankaj Jha; Arun Kumar Jha
- Cinematography: Justin J. Chambers; Sanjay Khanzode
- Release dates: 2016 (IFFSA); 2 October 2020

Mithila Makhaan is a Maithili language film directed by Nitin Chandra that stars Anurita Jha, Kranti Prakash Jha and Pankaj Jha.

Udit Narayan, Hariharan, Suresh Wadkar, and Sonu Nigam have provided playback voices for songs in the movie.

The movie won Best Maithili Film in the 63rd National Film Awards under the language section. It is the first-ever Maithili film from Bihar and Jharkhand to get a national award. Apart from winning Best Film in Maithili, "Mithila Makhaan" was also officially selected for the International Film Festival of South Asia (IFFSA) in Toronto in May, 2016, Jagran Film Festival - 2016 and National Film Festival - 2016 organised by the Ministry of Information and Broadcasting in New Delhi and NFAI, Pune. The film is high budget production with filming in US, Canada, India and Nepal. It was shot in a temperature of -35 °C in Canada and +45 °C in India and Nepal.

== Cast ==
- Kranti Prakash Jha as Kranti Prakash
- Anurita Jha as Maithili
- Pankaj Jha as Brahmha
- Prashant Rana
- Saket Kumar Mishra as Maithili's Brother

== Production ==
Mithila Makhaan was produced by Samir Kumar ( IIT, IIM, ex IAS-allied, Investment Banker) and Champaran Talkies, production house of actress-entrepreneur Neetu Chandra's and her brother Nitin Neera Chandra who is director of the film. The initial idea of the movie came to the director when he was working with an NGO during the 2008 Kosi floods and he was thinking of the need for people to find work in other countries.

== Awards and recognition ==
- National Film Awards for Best Maithili Film
- Official Selection For International Film Festival of South Asia at Toronto
- Screened at Patna International Film Festival
- Screened at NFAI, Pune
