= Deswa =

2011 Bhojpuri-language film

- Official film poster
- Directed by: Nitin Chandra
- Written by: Nitin Chandra
- Produced by: Neetu Chandra
- Starring: Ajay Kumar; Deepak Singh
- Cinematography: sanjay Khanzode
- Edited by: archit rastogi
- Music by: Ashutosh Singh
- Production company: Champaran Talkies
- Release date: 9 December 2011; (Bhojpuri version)
- Running time: 132 mins
- Country: India
- Language: Bhojpuri

Deswa (English: Country) is a 2011 Indian Bhojpuri social drama-crime thriller film written and directed by Nitin Chandra. It is the debut production of actress Neetu Chandra and features newcomers Ajay Kumar, Deepak Singh, and Kranti Prakash Jha, alongside seasoned actors Pankaj Jha and Ashish Vidyarthi. Deswa is recognized for its ambitious goal of transcending the typical Bhojpuri film market by incorporating multilingual dialogue in Bhojpuri, English, Telugu, and Hindi, and being dubbed into Tamil and Marathi.

It made history as the first Bhojpuri film in 50 years to be selected for the Indian Panorama section of the International Film Festival of India. The film was also showcased at several prestigious film festivals, including the South Asian Film Festival, Habitat World Film Festival, Montage Film Festival, International Film Festival of Fiji, and the International Film Festival of South Asia (IFFSA) in Toronto. The Hindi-language version of the film, titled Once Upon A Time In Bihar, was released in October 2015. The film premiered in Patna, Bihar, on November 20, 2011, with notable political figures, including Chief Minister Nitish Kumar, in attendance.

== Plot ==
The film deals with contemporary issues affecting youths. It begins in 2005 with a student protest during the corrupt administration, intended to free the characters played by Ajay Kumar and Deepak Singh. The film goes in a flashback of these two prisoners.

Singh is a temporary Government teacher who twice passed the written entrance examination for the Indian Police Service but was not selected for employment. Kumar is a brilliant student but from a poor family, which meant that he could not afford the ₹2,00,000 bribe that was necessary in order to secure a job. He has a friend who is of a lower caste, which adds to his woes because the relationship caused friction with both his older brother and society generally. While Kumar needs money for the bribe and to pay a dowry on the marriage of his sister, his friend needs finance to start a roadside tea stall and so escape the need to continue working for his cruel employer.

The young men plan the most unusual idea and, as the destiny would have, fail. Deswa is a 2-hour 10-minute film which will engage you through its picturesque cinematography, songs by the great Sonu Nigam, Shreya Ghoshal, Sunidhi Chauhan, Sharda Sinha, Bharat Sharma Vyas, Mika, Swanand Kirkire and a new singer from Bihar, Prabhakar Pandey and edge-of-the-seat thrilling scenes.

== Cast ==
- Ajay Kumar
- Deepak Singh
- Kranti Prakash Jha
- Arti Puri
- Neetu Chandra (Special Appearance in a folk dance choreographed by Ganesh Acharya.)

== Soundtrack ==
The soundtrack was released on the T-Series label and includes songs performed by singers such as Sonu Nigam, Sharda Sinha, Shreya Ghoshal, Mika and Sunidhi Chauhan. The music director is Ashutosh Singh.

No.	Title	Singer(s)	Length
1.	"Suna Suna"	Sonu Nigam, Shreya Ghoshal	7:34
2.	"Deswa Deswa"	Bharat Sharma Vyas
3.	"Chanarma Mein Daag"	Sonu Nigam
4.	"Ka Leke Aali Sabrwa"	Sharda Sinha
5.	"Manwa Ke Maani"	Swanand Kirkire
6.	"Bourahwa"	Mika Singh
7.	"Sautan Jar Mare"	Sunidhi Chauhan
8.	"Deswa Ke Ori"	Prabhakar Pandey

== Production ==
The film was filmed mostly in Bihar. Locations included Buxar district, Patna and Andhra Pradesh.

== Reception ==
The film received good response at the time of token when release in theatres. It was mainly released to make the film eligible for National Film Awards. A change in the screening times caused the audience numbers to rise. Nitin Chandra commented that "she is confident that the film would pick up gradually, although, apart from Neetu's dance number, it does not have any popular star, but great actors. The first day response during the trial screening was not that great probably because people prefer not too catch the morning show during winter". The whole idea is to release the film in both Hindi and Bhojpuri versions was taken later. The film also screened at the International Film Festival of India in Goa where it received favourable reviews from critics.

Despite an international presence of a Bhojpuri film, no one from the Bihar or film fraternity has come forward to get this film released.
