= Amar y temer =

- Genre: Telenovela
- Created by: Dago García
- Starring: Diana Hoyos; Salvador del Solar; Nicolás Montero
- Opening theme: Amar y temer (Andrés Cepeda)
- Country of origin: Colombia
- Original language: Spanish
- No. of episodes: 90

Production
- Production location: Bogotá

Original release
- Network: Caracol TV
- Release: February 23 – November 11, 2011

Amar y temer is a 2011 Colombian telenovela produced and broadcast by Caracol TV and Sony Pictures Entertainment.

== Synopsis ==
Alicia Aragón, a feminist in the 1950s, fakes her own death to escape from her husband, Pascual Ordóñez, and flees to Bogotá, where—disguised as Alberto, a man working at a newspaper—she meets Simón Oviedo, a boxer hoping to become Colombia's first world champion.

== History ==
The series premiered on February 23, 2011; its title had been changed from Los tiempos de la violencia ("The Times of Violence"), which reflected the machismo which was prevalent in Colombia during the decade. It was the second Caracol–Sony coproduction after Los caballeros las prefieren brutas (2008).

The telenovela struggled in the ratings; at the time, Caracol's telenovelas were failing to draw viewers from rival RCN, and the channel was known at the time for its practice of moving the time slots of shows or cutting them back without further warning. This occurred to the show in May, when Amar y temer was moved to a midnight time slot.

The program was nominated for a Premio India Catalina, for Best Telenovela, in 2012; Hoyos and del Solar were nominated for Best Lead Actress and Best Lead Actor, respectively. However, it did not win any of the awards.

== Cast ==
- Diana Hoyos as Alicia
- Salvador del Solar as Simón "El Destructor" Oviedo
- Nicolás Montero as Pascual
- Salvatore Cassandro as Duarte
