= Gabru Gang =

- Screenplay by: Sameer Khan
- Story by: Sameer Khan
- Produced by: Ashok Goenka; Arti Puri; Vivek Sinha; Sameer Khan
- Starring: Abhishek Duhan; Avtar Gill; Arti Puri
- Cinematography: Shaailesh Awasthi; Sunil Patel
- Edited by: Sameer Khan, Atit Jaideo
- Music by: Usmaan Khan; Sandeep Nath; Manj Musik; Abhinav R Kaushik
- Production companies: Interglobe Developments; Omsuraj Production; Kingsmaker Entertainment; Amritsar Talkies
- Distributed by: Panorama Studios
- Release date: 26 April 2024
- Country: India
- Language: Hindi

Gabru Gang is a 2024 Bollywood film starring Abhishek Duhan, Arti Puri directed by Sameer Khan and was released in theaters on April 26th, 2024 by Panorama Studios.

== Synopsis ==
Gabru Gang follows the journey of an 8 year old boy named Rajbeer Saluja, along with his friends Arshad and Uday, who win the prestigious Kite competition, HiFly 1999, and become the top kite flyers in Punjab by 2011. However, Rajbeer's focus shifts during the finals of the competition when he becomes distracted by a girl, resulting in his team's loss and the dissolution of Gabru Gang. Years later, destiny compels Rajbeer to take up kite flying once again, as he faces a new challenge in the form of the national level Hi-Fly 2019 competition. With the fate of Gabru Gang hanging in the balance, Rajbeer must reunite his team and overcome various obstacles to reclaim their former glory.

== Cast ==
- Abhishek Duhan as Rajbeer
- Srishty Rode as Ginni
- Avtar Gill as Mahendra Pratap Singh
- Arti Puri as Bulbul
- Abhilash Kumar as Harry
- Mukesh Bhatt as Vinod

== Production ==
The film is produced by Ashok Goenka, Arti Puri, Vivek Sinha, and Sameer Khan. Sameer Khan has also penned the story and screenplay, along with handling the dialogue writing. The music for the film is composed by Usmaan Khan, Sandeep Nath, Manj Musik, and Abhinav R Kaushik, with lyrics by Sameer Anjaan, Sandeep Nath, Neeraj Rajawat, Manjeet Singh, and Manj Musik. The film had been shot at various locations of Amritsar, Mumbai, Raigarh (Maharashtra).

== Release ==
The film Gabru Gang was released theatrically in India on 26 April 2024 by Panorama Studios.
