= Nitin Chandra =

Indian film director, producer and screenwriter

Nitin Chandra is an Indian film director, producer and screenwriter who mainly works in Bhojpuri cinema and Maithili cinema.

== Life ==
He is the elder brother of actress Nitu Chandra.

== Career ==
Chandra has directed movies Deswa, Mithila Makhaan etc. His Bhojpuri Film Deswa was premiered at International Film Festival of India in 2011. His recent film Jackson Halt released in 2023.

== Awards ==
He is the recipient of National Film Awards for his Maithili language film Mithila Makhaan in 2016.

== Filmography ==
Year	Title	Director	Screenwriter	Language	Notes	Ref.
Unknown	Boya Ped Babool Ka	Yes	-	Hindi	Documentary Film	
2009	Bring Back Bhar	Yes	Yes	Hindi	Documentary Film	
2009	A day in the life of Jhumpaa	Yes	Yes	Bhojpuri	Silent Short Film	
2011	Deswa	Yes	Yes	Bhojpuri	Screened at IFFI, Goa	
2016	Mithila Makhaan	Yes	Yes	Maithili	Won the National Film Award	
2017	The Suspect	Yes	Yes	Maithili	Short Film	
2017	Kill Your Mother Tongue	Yes	-	Bhojpuri/Hindi	Youtube Video	
2018	Diwali	Yes	Yes	Maithili	Short Film	
2019	Ladki	Yes	No	Maithili	Short Film	
2019	Aawa Bihar	Yes	-	Bhojpuri/Hindi	Ad Film	
2020	Threat	Yes	Yes	Bhojpuri	Short Film	
2022	Bihar Wala web series	Yes	Yes	Hindi	YoutubeVideo	
2023	Jackson Halt	Yes	Yes	Maithili		
2024	Bida	Yes	Yes	Bhojpuri	Short Film. Dubbed in Hindi, Magahi and Maithili	
2025	Kariyatthi	Yes	Yes	Bhojpuri		
2025	Chhath	Yes	Yes	Bhojpuri	Screened at IFFI, Goa	
