= Never Back Down: Revolt =

- Official DVD cover
- Directed by: Kellie Madison
- Written by: Audrey Arkins
- Produced by: David Zelon; Craig Baumgarten; Ben Jacques
- Starring: Olivia Popica; Michael Bisping; Neetu Chandra; Brooke Johnston; Tommy Bastow; Vanessa Campos; Diana Hoyos; James Faulkner
- Cinematography: Oliver Loncraine
- Edited by: Emma Gaffney
- Music by: Ram Khatabakhsh
- Production companies: Destination Films; Mandalay Pictures; Wonder Street; Fiction Films
- Distributed by: Sony Pictures Home Entertainment
- Release date: November 16, 2021
- Running time: 89 minutes
- Country: United States
- Language: English

Never Back Down: Revolt is a 2021 American martial arts film directed by Kellie Madison and written by Audrey Arkins. It is a standalone sequel to Never Back Down: No Surrender (2016), and the fourth installment overall in the Never Back Down film series. Unlike the other films in the series that focus on mainstream Mixed Martial Arts fighting, Revolt has a much darker tone, focusing on an underground fighting ring made up of kidnapped women, who band together to fight back against their captors and escape to freedom. The movie was released digitally and on DVD on November 16, 2021.

== Plot ==
Anya (Olivia Popica) and her brother Aslan (Tommy Bastow) are Russian immigrants living in London. They live a simple existence, with Anya's only companion aside from her brother being a pet parakeet that she keeps in a cage. Their parents were killed in the Chechnyan war, leaving them orphaned. Anya has been taking care of her brother ever since, working as a housekeeper while studying to be a nurse and supporting Aslan in his ill-fated career as an MMA fighter.

Desperate for money, Aslan agrees to throw a fight for a wealthy businessman named Julian (James Faulkner). However, after Anya, who was unaware of the arrangement, encourages him to fight harder, he ends up winning the match. This angers Julian, who lost 30,000 Pounds when Aslan won. After one of Julian's bodyguards attacks Aslan, Anya beats him in a fight, which impresses Julian's associate, a fight promoter named Mariah (Brooke Johnston). As Aslan is a has-been that nobody wants to see, Mariah asks Anya to compete in fighting matches as an opportunity to pay back Aslan's debt. After proving that she can fight, Mariah is impressed by Anya and takes her to Rome for an MMA match. However, they are taken to an isolated villa outside the city, which makes Anya nervous.

Anya quickly realizes that she has been trafficked, and when she attempts to escape, Mariah's enforcer, Janek (Michael Bisping), beats her severely and throws her into a makeshift jail filled with other trafficked women, who were also amateur fighters in need of money who were tricked by Mariah. The women, led by the ring's champion Jaya (Neetu Chandra) inform Anya that there is no way out except through the front door of the mansion, and that their captors have no intention of ever letting them go. The women are forced to fight each other in an illegal underground MMA ring for the entertainment of millionaires who bet on the outcome, and if they refuse to fight, they are sent to a brothel in Albania.

Anya immediately begins to plot a revolt against their captors so they can escape, but the women, especially Jaya, are jaded and believe an uprising is doomed to fail. Valentina (Diana Hoyos), who is mentally impaired after having her head repeatedly slammed against a wall, accidentally causes Mariah and Janek to learn of Anya's planned revolt, and Mariah punishes them by forcing Jaya to fight Valentina. Unwilling to be sent to Albania to be a sex slave, a despondent Valentina begs Jaya to kill her during the fight, and she reluctantly does so. Afterwards, Jaya tells Anya that she does not care about what happens to herself now and helps Anya lead the revolt. Janek tells the women that they will never return home, and any further attempts at rebellion will result in more punishment.

Meanwhile, Aslan is concerned for his sister's safety and holds Julian at gunpoint in an attempt to force him to call Mariah and demand Anya be released. However, before he can do so, Anya uses the facility doctor's cellphone to call Aslan and tell him the location, and to send police. The women then immediately begin the revolt, killing their captors. Janek, an experienced MMA fighter himself, puts up a good fight, but the women narrowly overpower him, forcing him into a bathtub while Jaya stabs him to death with a scalpel. The women then head into the fighting room, where they attack the millionaires who are watching a fight. Some of the women die, but all of their captors are killed in the revolt. After Mariah attempts to kill Anya, she beats Mariah to death. Anya and Jaya walk past the carnage and out the front door to freedom as police sent by Aslan arrive to rescue the women.

Six weeks later, Anya has recovered from her injuries and is back with Aslan in London. Inspired by her experiences, Anya opens the cage of her pet bird and lets it fly away.

== Cast ==
- Olivia Popica as Anya
- Michael Bisping as Janek
- Neetu Chandra as Jaya
- Brooke Johnston as Mariah
- Tommy Bastow as Aslan
- Hannah Al Rashid as Lori
- Vanessa Campos as Mali
- Diana Hoyos as Valentina
- James Faulkner as Julian

== Production ==
The film's cast and director was announced in November 2020. Filming was shot in London, during the COVID-19 pandemic. The end credits are scored to "I Gotta Rise Up", a song written and performed for the film by rapper BACHI. The film's fight choreographer was Tim Man (along with some contributions from The Raid 2's Cecep Arif Rahman) and Dan Styles was the stunt coordinator.

== Reception ==
Never Back Down: Revolt received mixed reviews from audiences. Positive reviews highlighted the film's darker tone and focus on female fighters, but negative reviews highlighted the film's lack of fight scenes compared to the other three films in the series and lack of returning characters. The Guardian gave the film 3 out of 4 stars, writing: "Pulpy nonsense, to be sure, but, somehow, this is eminently watchable, and it's a relief there's no sexual abuse shown, even if the possibility of it exists. Moreover, it's interesting and kind of sweet that there's no love interest for Anya to moon over. Instead, the most significant relationships in the film are between her and her brother, and then later between the women locked up in the makeshift prison."

Screen Rant said that Revolt redefined the series, writing: "Never Back Down: Revolt is raising the stakes for the series in a big way a little like the transition from the first to the second movies in the Best of the Best series, putting life, death, and freedom on the table with the old, trusted concept of an underground fight club." In their ranking of the series, Screen Rant ranked Revolt at number 3, above the original Never Back Down. Screen Rant wrote: "Never Back Down: Revolt is a little bit smaller of a story than its title might suggest, but it's an entertaining underground fight flick that sets up the franchise to continue in a new direction." The Hollywood News gave it a positive review, but said that the different tone of the film could disappoint fans: "A less sunny and more serious glimpse into the reality of underground fight rings, Never Back Down: Revolt stands apart from its predecessors, but in pushing so hard to be different, it will potentially alienate the audience that fell in love with the series."

The Times of India gave the film a negative review, drawing negative comparisons to exploitation genres, namely Blaxploitation and Women in prison: "Never Back Down – Revolt is an extremely average affair though not exactly torturous. It fits the parameters of a typical B-grade film sans sex. The plot is something that has been attempted numerous times in the past and now looks done to death. Recall films like Raze and Unchained." The Fight Library praised Michael Bisping's performance but gave it 2.5 out of 10, writing: "To be honest, watching Never Back Down: Revolt was a chore. From the shallow story set up, to the lull in the middle, and the anti-climatic ending, watching the latest installment of the series seems like a drag."
