= Never Back Down 2: The Beatdown =

2011 film by Michael Jai White

- Official DVD cover
- Directed by: Michael Jai White
- Written by: Chris Hauty
- Based on: Characters by Chris Hauty
- Produced by: Craig Baumgarten; David Zelon
- Starring: Evan Peters; Dean Geyer; Alex Meraz; Todd Duffee; Scottie Epstein; Michael Jai White; Jillian Murray
- Cinematography: Yaron Levi
- Edited by: Debra Weinfeld
- Music by: David Wittman
- Production companies: Mandalay Pictures; BMP, Inc.
- Distributed by: Stage 6 Films
- Release dates: April 8, 2011 (ActionFest); September 13, 2011 (DVD)
- Running time: 103 minutes
- Country: United States
- Language: English
- Budget: $5.5 million

Never Back Down 2: The Beatdown (also known as The Fighters 2: The Beatdown in some markets), is a 2011 American martial arts film, directed by Michael Jai White from a script written by Chris Hauty. It is a sequel to Never Back Down (2008), and the second installment in the film series of the same name; the film stars Evan Peters, Michael Jai White, Dean Geyer, Alex Meraz, Todd Duffee, Scott Epstein and Jillian Murray. The film made its world premiere at the ActionFest film festival in Asheville, North Carolina, on April 8, 2011, and was released on DVD on September 13, from Sony Pictures Home Entertainment. The film marks White's directorial debut.

== Plot ==
Max Cooperman is in charge of another upcoming fight at the underground event "The Beatdown", and four fighters are training in a vacant lot under very-experienced martial artist Case Walker: Zack Gomes, who recently quit boxing after sustaining a partially detached retina from a match; skilled MMA fighter Tim Newhouse, whose family is in debt following the death of his father; Mike Stokes, a champion wrestler part of his college's team who is dealing with personal issues related to his father leaving his mother for another man; and Justin Epstein, a comic book store clerk who is the frequent target of bullying. Max offers Case the chance to make some money and at the same time, help him promote the Beatdown. A few weeks into training, the four trainees argue over their reasons for training and deserving to be there more, the worst of it being Justin and Zack hurting each other physically, leaving them to settle it themselves. Later on, Case is harassed by police officers, who threaten him for violating his probation. Because of this, the team builds a new gym where they can train and hold the Beatdown tournament.

Danger strikes when Justin snaps from constant bullying, goes rogue and decides to not only attack his personal enemies but also the group itself by framing their mentor and setting him up to go to jail. The rest of the group, in revenge, band together and take on Justin at the Beatdown. With each facing their own trials to reach the final match, it comes down to only one of them versus their own. Mike defeats Zack, while Justin injures Tim in the restroom, thus eliminating him from the tournament. In the tournament finals, Mike engages Justin in a grueling fight until he wins by breaking Justin's right shoulder via an Omoplata submission hold. Justin attempts to retaliate by jumping Mike from behind, but Mike counters with a superman punch to the face. As Mike celebrates his win, he finally calls his father and ask him to go out to dinner because they have a lot to talk about. Case gets a call from "Big" John McCarthy and confirms his return to MMA.

== Cast ==
- Dean Geyer as Mike "Wrestler Kid" Stokes
- Alex Meraz as Zack "Smoke and Thunder" Gomes
- Michael Jai White as Casey "Case" Walker Jr.
- Jillian Murray as Eve
- Scott Epstein as Justin Epstein
- Evan Peters as Max Cooperman
- Todd Duffee as Tim Newhouse
- Laura Cayouette as Vale
- Lyoto Machida as Himself
- "Big" John McCarthy as Himself
- Eddie Bravo as D.J. Bravo

== Production ==
Never Back Down 2: The Beatdown marked the directorial debut of Michael Jai White, who also starred as Case Walker. White said he assembled what he described as his "dream cast", including mixed martial artist Todd Duffee in his feature film debut alongside Dean Geyer, Scottie Epstein and Alex Meraz. Fight choreography was overseen by Larnell Stovall, who designed the film's mixed martial arts sequences.

== Soundtrack ==
1. Rular Rah – "It's Supposed to Happen"
2. Rular Rah – "The Freshest"
3. Joe Jackson feat. Skratch Music – "Super Star"
4. Stephen R. Phillips & Tim P. – "Lick My Plate"
5. Tucker Jameson & The Hot Mugs – "Train Tracks"
6. Rick Balentine – "1st Attack of the Marms"
7. Willknots – "Perfect Day"
8. Startisan – "Just"
9. For The Taking – "Time Is Running Out"
10. Justyna Kelley – "Fall Into You"
11. Stereo Black – "Inside"
12. Metaphor the Great & Jonathan Jackson – "Doo Doo Butt"
13. Kritical – "Are You Ready for This"
14. Pre-Fight Hype – "It's Goin Down"
15. Robert Fortune – "Cadillac"
16. The Resistors – "UTA"
17. For The Taking – "Takedown"
18. Rular Rah – "Only If You Knew"
19. Compella and The Twister – "Are You Ready"
20. Cody B. Ware – "#33 Forever"^{[A]}
21. Tucker Jameson & The Hot Mugs – "Last Train Home"
22. Compella and The Twister – "Dropped"

Notes

- A "#33 Forever" by Cody B. Ware is mistitled as "Are You Ready" in the DVD credits.

== Home media ==
The film was released on DVD on September 13, 2011, from Sony Pictures Home Entertainment.

== Reception ==
Matt Edwards of Den of Geek described the film as a surprisingly good movie in the MMA genre of movies that goes straight to video. Stating that it does everything it was meant to do and it is not really memorable. However, the Edwards indicates that although the movie is formulaic in nature as the main character and his associates enter into the martial arts tournament, the fighting scenes were impressive, especially those featuring White. Tyler Foster of DVD Talk was more critical of the film's tonal choices, noting how the change from the PG-13 rating to the R rating was unnecessary, since there was a lot of foul language and nudity used, which did not really fit into the movie considering the age group it targeted. Z Ravas of City on Fire offered a more favorable assessment, calling it White's strongest performance to that point. This was based on the scene where White talks about his history and how Hurricane Katrina impacted him and his family. Also, as pointed out in the review, Evan Peters, who played the same character he played in the first movie, is the scene partner of White in the film's dramatic scenes.

Film critic William "Vern" Herold of Outlawvern was more critical of the film noting that the underground fight club in this movie is among the poorer fictional fighting tournaments seen on screen due to the lack of weapons, fatal battles, or strange locations since everything takes place in one gym only. R.L. Shaffer of IGN gave the film a negative review, rating it a 4 out of 10. According to the review, the film is inferior to other movies directed by Michael Jai White, including Black Dynamite. This criticism stems from the fact that the decision to make the film was made in such a way that White took up the role of an actor, playing a side character while taking directorial duties at the same time. These are the two main reasons for which IGN criticized the movie because of its long run time and its unnecessary emphasis on the dialogue and development of the characters involved. This, according to the Shaffer, comes as a result of the choice to use MMA fighters and UFC champions in starring roles as their skills as actors do not allow them to be involved in serious dialogue. According to the review, the fight scenes in this movie are adequate enough but pale in comparison to those from the Undisputed movie franchise, where White played a leading role.

== Sequel ==
A sequel titled Never Back Down: No Surrender, was released on June 7, 2016. It began filming in Thailand again under the direction of White, who also reprises his role as Case Walker. The film also stars Esai Morales, MMA fighter Josh Barnett, Tony Jaa, former professional wrestler Nathan Jones and Gillian Waters.
