= Sinú, río de pasiones =

- Also known as: River of Passions
- Genre: Telenovela
- Directed by: Andrés Marroquín; Rodolfo Hoyos; Juan Carlos Delgado
- Starring: Natalia Jerez; Jacqueline Arenal; Mario Espitia; Carlos Enrique Almirante; Diana Hoyos; Jorge Cao
- Opening theme: Bajo el agua by Manuel Medrano
- Country of origin: Colombia
- Original language: Spanish

Production
- Running time: 60 minutes
- Production company: Caracol Televisión

Original release
- Network: Caracol Televisión
- Release: January 18 – April 19, 2016

Sinú, río de pasiones (English: River of Passions) is a Colombian telenovela produced and broadcast by Caracol Televisión from January 18 to April 19, 2016. It stars Natalia Jerez, Mario Espitia, Jacqueline Arenal, Carlos Enrique Almirante and Jorge Cao as the main protagonists.

== Cast ==
- Natalia Jerez as Lina María Henao
- Mario Espitia as Cristian Dangond
- Jacqueline Arenal as Sonia Mascote
- Carlos Enrique Almirante as Felipe Guerra
- Sofia Araujo as Elizabeth Puello
- Diana Hoyos as Leonilde Amador
- Abel Rodríguez as Anibal Dangond
- Jorge Cao as Carlos Puello
- Myriam De Lourdes as Claudia Escamilla
- Ricardo Mejía as Marcos Galarza
- Katherine Castrillón as Lizbeth Cruz
- José Narváez as Jose Diaz Granados
- Viña Machado as Mery Ortega
- Luis Eduardo Motoa as Gerardo Henao
- Jorge Enrique Abello as Coronel Arteaga
- Fernando Solórzano as Ortega
- Juliana Galvis as Luisa
- John Bolivar as Harald
- Walter Luengas as lawyer
- Victor Hugo Morant as Ortega's lawyer
- Gabriel Ochoa as Mauricio
- David Noreña as prosecutor
- Victor Cifuentes as judge
- Eibar Gutiérrez as The Master of Vallenato
- Sthepanie Abello as journalist
- John Mario Rivera as The Propio
- Luis Carlos Fuquen as Héctor Maya
- Ricardo Vélez as Botero
- Linda Baldrich as Elsa Mogollón
- Jairo Ordoñez as Siete
- Zulma Rey
- Fernando Lara
- Mauricio Montoya
- Jorge Sanchez

== Broadcast ==
The series premiered on January 18, 2016, in Colombia on Caracol Televisión.
