= Mysteries Shaque =

- Directed by: Vinod Chhabra
- Produced by: Vinod Chhabra
- Starring: Janki Shah; Quber (Dhananjay) Chauhan; Prem Chopra; Upasana Singh; Aarti Puri
- Music by: Ravi Powar
- Distributed by: Maa Shakti Entertainer
- Release date: 1 October 2004
- Running time: 124 Minutes
- Country: India
- Language: Hindi

Mysteries Shaque is a Hindi action thriller film of Bollywood directed and produced by Vinod Chhabra. This movie was released in the banner of Maa Shakti Entertainer on 1 October 2004.

== Plot ==
Puja is the daughter of a multibillionaire businessman studying at a college in Canada. She is the sole survivor after the death of her parents. Puja's uncle Kumar became trusty of her huge properties. As per the will on turning twenty-one, Pooja will inherit the entire property in her name. Kumar forces Pooja to leave her studies in Canada and join a college in India with his son Prem so that they get married, and hence all properties remain back to Uncle Kumar and Prem. In the new college in India, Pooja meets Rohit and his group of friends and a tomboy-type lady, Simran. Although very first day, Pooja is ragged by Rohit, but after a few encounters, they started liking each other. On the other side, a boy looking exactly like Rohit enters into the plot, which has a dark past. A series of murders put Rohit and Puja in danger. The conspiracy against Puja is revealed at the climax.

== Cast ==
- Janki Shah as Puja
- Quber (Dhananjay) Chauhan
- Prem Chopra as Uncle Kumar
- Upasana Singh
- Aarti Puri as Simran
- Dhananjay Chouhan as Rohit

== Production ==
Mysteries Shaque was made at a budget of Rs 2 crore. Janki Shah said in an interview that director Vinod Chhabra tricked her into a topless scene, a smooching scene and appearing in a bikini in the film. Later she claimed she didn't have problems with the director.
