= Chris Hauty =

American screenwriter (born 1956)

- Born: June 27, 1956 (age 69); United States
- Occupations: Screenwriter, novelist

Chris Hauty (born June 27, 1956) is an American screenwriter. He also writes novels, including Deep State, which was published in January 2020 by Simon & Schuster.

== Filmography ==
- Homeward Bound II: Lost in San Francisco (1996)
- Never Back Down (2008)
- Never Back Down 2: The Beatdown (2011)
- Never Back Down: No Surrender (2016)
- Sniper: Ghost Shooter (2016)
- Sniper: Ultimate Kill (2017)
