= Diana Hoyos =

Colombian actress

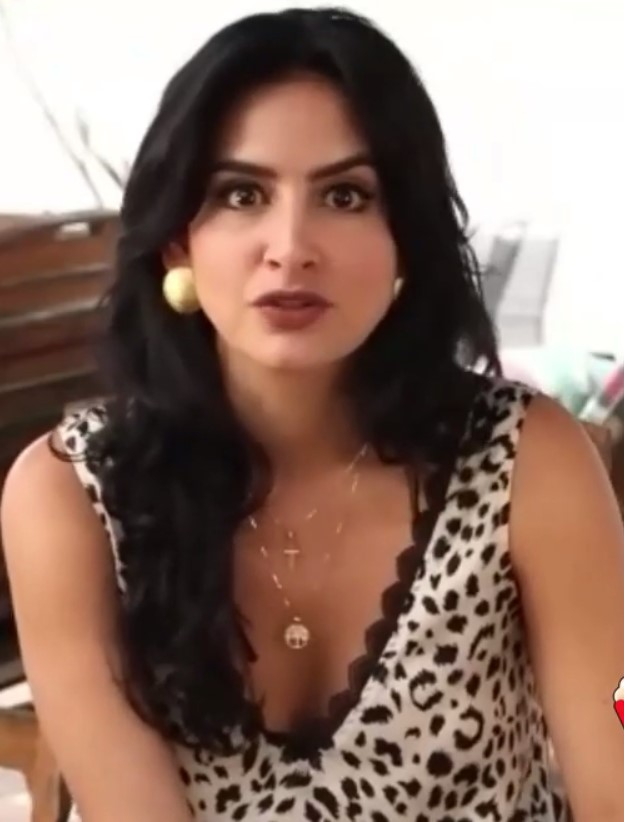
- Born: Diana Patricia Hoyos Buenaventura; 22 April 1985 (age 41); Cali, Colombia
- Other names: Bitto, La Bonita, Diani
- Occupations: Actress, singer
- Years active: 2002–present

Diana Hoyos is a Colombian actress and singer, known for her starring role in the Caracol Televisión telenovela Oye bonita. She is also known in her native country for other productions such as Amar y temer, El Chivo, and Sinú, río de pasiones.

== Filmography ==
=== Film roles ===
Year	Title	Role	Notes
2003	El carro	Lorena	
2017	Sniper: Ultimate Kill	María Ramos	
2021	Never Back Down: Revolt	Valentina	
2025	Diablo	Alex	

=== Television roles ===
Year	Title	Role	Notes
2002	Popstars: Colombia	Herself	
2003	La jaula	Rosa	
2004	El vuelo de la cometa	María Consuelo Martínez	
2005	Decisiones		
2006	Floricienta: Colombian version	Clara	
2008	Oye bonita	Diana Lacouture Murgas	Main role
2010	El cartel	Zully Carmona	
2011	Amar y temer	Alicia Benitez	
2012	Pablo Escobar, The Drug Lord	Nancy Restrepo de Lara	Episode: "Las lecciones de Doña Enelia"
2013	Comando élite	Teniente Sarah Restrepo	
2014	El Chivo	Ángela Durán	
2016	Sinú, río de pasiones	Leo Amador	
2016/2017	Hilos de Sangre Azul	Sara Yunus	
2019	El General Naranjo	Valentina Montoya	
2019–2021	Nurses	María Clara González	Main role (season 1–2)
2022	Te la dedico	Adriana Osorio	Main role
