= Kellie Madison =

American film producer

- Born: Kellie Ann Halihan; Chicago, Illinois
- Occupations: Writer; producer; director; actress
- Years active: 2000–present
- Notable work: Dear Mr. Gacy; Never Back Down: Revolt

Kellie Madison is an American writer, producer, director and actress. Her passion for film derives from the stories she wants to tell "that inspire, entertain and move people." Additionally, she is best known for being the executive producer and screenwriter of the Canadian drama thriller, Dear Mr. Gacy. Her production company, Madison Films, is run by Madison herself and associate producer Sherrie Adams with a focus on the development and production of various media projects.

== Career ==
Madison began her career as an actress having minor roles in several films, such as 2000's Under the Bus and 2001's The Rest of Your Life. In 2002, Madison realized her desire to move beyond acting and began to write, produce, and eventually direct films.

One of Madison's first ventures in screenwriting took place when she wrote the screenplay for the aforementioned Dear Mr. Gacy, adapted from the Jason Moss' book, The Last Victim. Additionally, she claimed to have grown up down the street from John Wayne Gacy in Chicago, Illinois. Bearing the same name as her screenplay, the film about the serial killer was developed and produced with the assistance of Clark Peterson, the executive producer of Monster. Unfortunately, Moss—who Madison was in negotiations with regarding the film—committed suicide during production, leaving Madison to re-negotiate with his widow.

Sometime during the mid-2000s, Madison discovered that one of her close friends had obsessive-compulsive disorder, which enticed her to learn more about it via Replay Rewind Repeat: A Memoir of Obsessive Compulsive Disorder by Jeff Bell. Based on her growing interest for awareness of the disorder, Madison wrote the screenplay for Machine Man, a film about the struggles of OCD. Her primary reason for writing the screenplay was to educate audiences on a topic that she feels has not been properly addressed with a goal of removing the stigma associated with it. Producer and actor Craig James Pietrowiak (International Screenwriter Association) had similar interests in the topic and joined Madison to support the creation of the film. A Kickstarter campaign was put in place to raise $225,000 and fund the film, but only $12,903 was donated and the effort was ultimately unsuccessful. As of today, it is unclear what production stage Machine Man is in and if it is still in development.

In 2011, Madison became involved with the Tomorrow/Bokra production team as a co-producer for the Arabic charity single.

In 2013, Madison was a finalist in the Project Imaginat10n film contest in which contestants created shorts films based on a selection of crowdsourced photographs, all of which were judged by Ron Howard and Bryce Dallas Howard. Her submission for the contest was The Caul, a short film that Madison wrote and directed about two twins born in the caul who gain supernatural abilities. During the same year, Madison signed with Zero Gravity Management just after she began to work on Hotel 33, a mystery about the 1953 events surrounding the Grand Hotel in Williamsport, PA that Nicolas Cage was rumoured to be attached to. Like Machine Man, the fate of Hotel 33 remains unclear.

More recently, Madison worked with Ohio-based Big River Studios where she took on both writing and directing responsibilities for 2015's The Tank, her feature directorial debut about a failed Mars simulation trip. The thriller is planned to be distributed by Open Road Films.

In 2021, Madison directed Never Back Down: Revolt, the fourth installment in the Never Back Down franchise.

She is currently based in Los Angeles, California, where her production company, Madison Films, is established.

== Filmography ==
Short film

Year	Title	Director	Writer	Producer	Actress	Ref.
2003	Nenu	No	Yes	Yes	Yes	
2004	Rain Today	No	Yes	Executive	Yes	
2004	Spoon Brother	No	Yes	No	No	
2005	Falling	No	Yes	Executive	Yes	
2006	Under	No	Yes	No	No	
2008	The Line Up	No	Yes	No	No	
2008	Box Castle	No	Yes	No	No	
2009	Slice of Water	Yes	Yes	Yes	No	
2009	Dogs of Drendon	No	Yes	No	No	
2010	Star Struck	Yes	Yes	Yes	No	
2010	Bathtub Picnic	Yes	Yes	Yes	No	
2013	The Caul	Yes	Yes	Yes	No	

Feature film

Year	Title	Director	Writer	Executive Producer	Ref.
2010	Dear Mr. Gacy	No	Yes	Yes	
2015	The Tank	Yes	Yes	No	
2021	Never Back Down: Revolt	Yes	No	No	

Trailer

Year	Title	Director	Writer	Producer	Ref.
2011	Machine Man	Yes	Yes	Yes	

Other credits

Year	Title	Role	Notes	Ref.
2007	Bratz: The Movie	Production Marketer		
2007	Alive N' Kickin'	Line Producer	TV movie	
2011	Tomorrow/Bokra	Co-producer	Music video	
2011	The Abolition of Sex	Writer		
2011	Hotel 33	Writer		

=== Acting credits ===
Film

- Under the Bus (2000)
- The Rest of Your Life (2001)
- Hale Bopp (2003)

Television

Year	Title	Episode	Ref.
2006	Scrubs	"My Buddy's Booty"	
2006	Freddie	"Mother of All Grandfathers"	

Video

- Monster Mountain (2012)
