= Nitu Chandra =

Indian actress, model and film producer (born 1984)

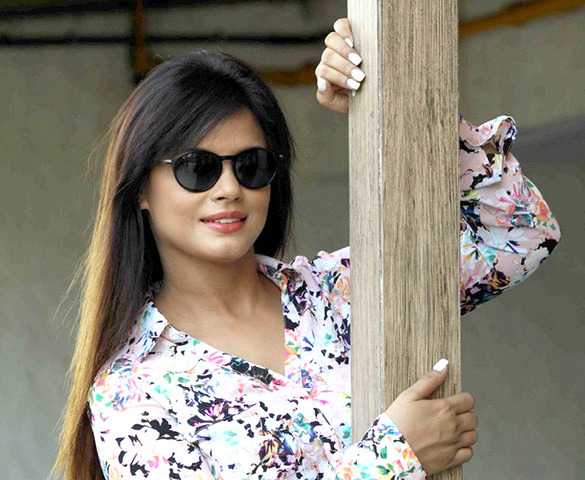
- Nitu in 2017
- Born: Neetu Chandra Srivastava; 20 June 1984 (age 42); Buxar, Bihar, India
- Occupations: Actress, film producer, model, martial artist
- Years active: 2003–present
- Relatives: Nitin Chandra (brother)

Nitu Chandra (born Neetu Chandra Srivastava on June 20, 1984) is an Indian actress, model, film producer and theatre artist. She has worked in Hindi, Tamil and Telugu films. She is also a classical dancer and a sportsperson, involved in the promotion of basketball in the country through her close association with the NBA and Taekwondo, being a fourth Dan black-belt. She has her own production house named Champaran Talkies, winning the National Film Award for the film Mithila Makhaan in the category of Best Maithili Film. The national award-winning film was directed by her brother Nitin Chandra.

== Early life and education ==
Nitu Chandra was born on 20 June 1984 in Buxar, Bihar. Her mother tongue is Bhojpuri. She was educated at the Notre Dame Academy, Patna and completed her undergraduate education at Delhi's Indraprastha College. She started modelling and Nitu gives credit of her success to her mother, a native of East Champaran in Bihar. She has appeared in several advertisements and videos for firms since her graduation. She holds two Dan black belts in Taekwondo and represented India in the 1997 World Taekwondo Championships in Hong Kong.

Chandra's brother is Nitin Chandra who directed the movie Deswa.

== Acting career ==
Chandra debuted in the Hindi film industry in 2005 with Garam Masala in which she portrayed the role of Sweety, an air-hostess. She also acted in Godavari, a Telugu film, in 2006. In 2007 she appeared in Madhur Bhandarkar's film, Traffic Signal.

In 2008, she had four releases, being directed by Dibakar Banerjee, Rahul Dholakia, Ashwini Dheer and Vikram. Her Tamil film, Yavarum Nalam with Madhavan, released in 2009, was declared a major hit. In 2010 she was seen in four Hindi films, Rann, Apartment, No Problem, in which she made a special appearance, and Sadiyaan, and one Tamil film, Theeradha Vilaiyattu Pillai.

In 2011 Deswa, a Bhojpuri film which she produced and which was directed by her brother, was released.

In 2013, she acted in the Tamil-language action film Ameerin Aadhi-Bhagavan alongside Jayam Ravi. In 2013 she had completed filming for a Greek film Home Sweet Home, in which she plays an Indian girl. On the recommendation of the director Anurag Kashyap, she auditioned for the film via Skype. She had to learn Greek for the film and also dubbed herself. Later it was revealed that Home Sweet Home was the working title of the film and the film's actual name was Block 12 where she played an Indian goddess. The film was released in 2013 and was bilingual (it was shot in English and Greek). She has two Hindi films, Kusar Prasad Ka Bhoot and Shooter, coming up.

In 2020, she appeared in the Hollywood show Gown and out in Beverly Hills with Bollywood actor Sammy John Heaney.In 2021, she made her Hollywood film debut through a woman-centric martial arts film Never Back Down: Revolt which is the standalone sequel to Never Back Down: No Surrender and the fourth installment overall in the Never Back Down franchise. Unlike its predecessors in the franchise, the film is much darker in tone. She plays a female martial artist named Jaya in that film. She revealed that in 2019, when she was invited to the special screening of Bad Boys For Life at Sony Pictures Studios, she met the producer of the film David Zelon at the screening who was looking for an Indian actress for the film at that time. Zelon was impressed by her diverse film portfolio and martial arts experience and she was selected for the role without having any audition or look test. Chandra went on a vegan diet and did rigorous exercise in order to prepare for her role. She did all of her stunts in that film without using any body double. The film was released digitally and on DVDs on 16 November 2021 and it received mixed reviews.

== Other work ==
Chandra became the brand ambassador for the Hoop, a Gitanjali brand. She also took part in a commercial for Mysore Sandal Soap. Nitu Chandra also appeared in music director Ismail Darbar's music video "Rasiya Saajan" along with Zubeen Garg. She was also seen in the music video of Bombay Vikings' singer Neeraj Shridhar's hit single "Aa Raha Hoon Main". She also appeared in a successful remix of Sajna Hai Mujhe from D.J. Hot Remix Vol.1 (and the song appeared in 7 other albums after that), and the super hit song Mera Babu Chhail Chhabila (CD - Sophie & Dr.Love, DVD - D. J. Hot Remix Vol.2 & The Return Of Kaanta Mix) alongside Sophie Choudry (the song appeared in 9 other albums after that).

In 2013, Chandra made her debut in theatre, in a play, called Umrao, which featured her in the title role. She has been hosting Rangoli on DD National since May 2017. In 2018, Chandra became Community Ambassador for Patna Pirates in pro kabaddi league.

== In the media ==
In 2008, 7Seas Technologies launched a 3D mobile game, Nitu — The Alien Killer, with Nitu Chandra as the lead character.

Nitu was featured on the cover of the January 2009 issue of Indian Maxim.

== Filmography ==
=== As actress ===
Year	Film	Role	Language	Notes
2003	Vishnu	Teju	Telugu	Telugu debut film
2005	Garam Masala	Sweety	Hindi	Hindi debut film, credited as Neetu
2006	Godavari	Rajeswari 'Raji'	Telugu	
2007	Traffic Signal	Rani	Hindi	
2008	One Two Three	Inspector Mayawati Chautala	Hindi	
2008	Summer 2007		Hindi	special appearance in song
2008	Oye Lucky! Lucky Oye!	Sonal	Hindi	
2009	Satyameva Jayate	Basara Papa	Telugu	
2009	Yavarum Nalam	Priya Manohar	Tamil	Bilingual film Tamil debut
2009	13B	Priya Manohar	Hindi	Bilingual film Tamil debut
2010	Mumbai Cutting		Hindi	
2010	Rann	Yasmin Hussain	Hindi	
2010	Apartment	Neha Bhargav	Hindi	
2010	No Problem	Sophia	Hindi	
2010	Sadiyaan		Hindi	special appearance in song
2010	Theeradha Vilaiyattu Pillai	Tejaswini	Tamil	
2011	Yuddham Sei	Cabaret Dancer	Tamil	Special appearance in song "Kannitheevu Ponna"
2011	Kucch Luv Jaisaa	Ria	Hindi	
2011	Deswa		Bhojpuri	Special Appearance
2013	Aadhi Baghavan	Rani Sampatha / Karishma	Tamil	SIIMA Award for Best Actress in Negative role
2013	Settai	Herself	Tamil	Special appearance in song "Laila Laila"
2013	Block 12	Indian Goddess	Greek	Greek film debut
2014	Manam	Air hostess	Telugu	Cameo appearance
2014	Power		Kannada	Special appearance in song "Why Why (YY)"
2015	Thilagar	Village Dancer	Tamil	special appearance in song
2017	Singam 3	Bar Dancer	Tamil	Special Appearance in song "O Sone Sone"
2017	Vaigai Express	Radhika/ Jyothika	Tamil	Dual Role
2017	Brahma.com	Nitu Chandra	Tamil	
2021	Never Back Down: Revolt	Jaya	English	Hollywood Debut
2026	No Means No	Neetu	English, Hindi, Polish	Trilingual film
2026	Aakhri Sawal	Kavya Rawat	Hndi	

=== As producer ===
Year	Film	Language	Notes
2011	Deswa	Bhojpuri	
2016	Mithila Makhaan	Maithili	

=== Television ===
Year(s)	Show	Role	Channel	Notes	Ref.
2017–2018	Rangoli	Host/presenter	DD National		
