= Wild Things (film series) =

American film series

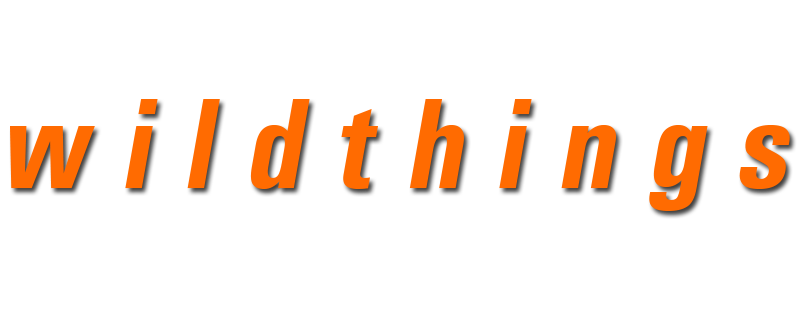
- First and fourth films logo
- Created by: Stephen Peters
- Owner: Sony Pictures Entertainment
- Years: 1998–2010

Films and television
- Film: Wild Things (1998)
- Television films: Wild Things 2 (2004); Diamonds in the Rough (2005)
- Direct-to-video: Foursome (2010)

Audio
- Soundtrack: Wild Things (Original Motion Picture Soundtrack) (1998)

Wild Things is an American erotic thriller film series owned by Sony Pictures Entertainment, and consisting of two feature films and two television films.

== Films ==
Film	U.S. release date	Director(s)	Screenwriter(s)	Producer(s)
Wild Things	March 20, 1998	John McNaughton	Stephen Peters	Rodney M. Liber & Steven A. Jones
Wild Things 2	March 6, 2004	Jack Perez	Andy Hurst & Ross Helford	Marc Bienstock
Wild Things: Diamonds in the Rough	February 19, 2005	Jay Lowi	Andy Hurst & Ross Helford	Marc Bienstock
Wild Things: Foursome	June 1, 2010	Andy Hurst	Monty Featherstone & Howard Zemski	Marc Bienstock

=== Wild Things (1998) ===
In south Florida, a high school counselor is accused of rape by a manipulative rich girl and her trailer trash classmate. The cop on the case begins to suspect a conspiracy and dives into an elaborate and devious web of greed and betrayal to find the truth.

=== Wild Things 2 (2004) ===
An insurance investigator follows two young women who scheme to inherit millions of dollars.

=== Wild Things: Diamonds in the Rough (2005) ===
Two young women will stop at nothing for one to gain a $4 million inheritance of two priceless diamonds, while two detectives try to thwart their plans, but find complications abound.

=== Wild Things: Foursome (2010) ===
A murdered millionaire's son finds himself tangled up in a game of seduction and murder after a raunchy night with three beautiful women.

=== Cancelled sequel ===
In February 2006, it was reported that Neve Campbell and Denise Richards would appear in Backstabbers, and producers were trying to get more of the original film's cast to star as well. Although Backstabbers would have reportedly reunited members of the cast and crew of Wild Things, it would not have been a sequel. Backstabbers never saw release.

== Principal and recurring cast ==
Key

- A dark gray cell indicates the character was not in the film.

Characters	Films			
Characters	Wild Things	Wild Things 2	Wild Things: Diamonds in the Rough	Wild Things: Foursome
Characters	1998	2004	2005	2010
Sergeant Ray Duquette	Kevin Bacon			
Sam Lombardo	Matt Dillon			
Suzie Toller	Neve Campbell			
Kenneth Bowden	Bill Murray			
Kelly Van Ryan	Denise Richards			
Sandra Van Ryan	Theresa Russell			
Detective Gloria Perez	Daphne Rubin-Vega			
Brittney Havers		Susan Ward		
Maya King		Leila Arcieri		
Terence Bridge		Isaiah Washington		
Detective Michael Morrison		Linden Ashby	Linden Ashby	
Niles Dunlap		Anthony John Denison		
Dr. Julian Haynes		Joe Michael Burke		
Elena Sandoval			Sandra McCoy	
Marie Clifton			Sarah Laine	
Kristen Richards			Dina Meyer	
Jay Clifton			Brad Johnson	
Dr. Chad Johnson			Ron Melendez	
Brandi Cox				Jillian Murray
Rachel Thomas				Marnette Patterson
Carson Wheetly				Ashley Parker Angel
Detective Frank Walker				John Schneider
George Stuben				Ethan Smith
Linda Dobson				Jessie Nickson
Ted Wheetly				Cameron Daddo

== Additional crew and production details ==
Film	Crew/detail						
Film	Composer(s)	Cinematographer(s)	Editor(s)	Production companies	Distributing companies	Running time	
Film	Wild Things	George S. Clinton	Jeffrey L. Kimball	Elena Maganini	Mandalay Entertainment	Columbia Pictures (Sony Pictures Releasing)	108 minutes
Wild Things 2	John Nau; Andrew Feltenstein	Seo Mutarevic	Axel Hubert	TriStar Pictures; Destination Films; Mandalay Pictures; Magic Hour Pictures	Encore Mystery	95 minutes	
Wild Things: Diamonds in the Rough	Steven M. Stern	Hubert Taczanowski	Anthony Adler	Destination Films; Mandalay Pictures; Lightning Entertainment	Encore Mystery	87 minutes	
Wild Things: Foursome	Steven M. Stern	Jeffrey D. Smith	Anthony Adler	Stage 6 Films; Mandalay Pictures; RCA Media Group; SG Productions	Sony Pictures Home Entertainment	92 minutes	

== Reception ==
=== Box office performance ===
Film	Box office gross			Budget	Reference
Film	North America	Other territories	Worldwide	Budget	Reference
Wild Things	$30,147,739	TBA	$67.2 million	$20 million	

=== Critical and public response ===
Title	Rotten Tomatoes	Metacritic	CinemaScore
Wild Things (1998)	65% (120 reviews)	51 (20 reviews)	C+

== Music ==
Title	U.S. release date	Length	Composer(s)	Label
Wild Things (Original Motion Picture Soundtrack)	April 7, 1998	36:09	George S. Clinton	Varèse Sarabande
