= List of films and television shows set in Miami =

The city of Miami, Florida in the United States is a popular location for the filming and setting of movies and television shows, both fictional and non-fictional. The following article provides a list of films and television shows which have been partially or wholly set in or shot in Miami. The listed shows span a wide variety of genres and range from shows almost entirely shot and set in the city (e.g., The Golden Girls and Miami Vice) to those containing only a small number of scenes shot or set in Miami (e.g., Lost and Thunderball (1965)).

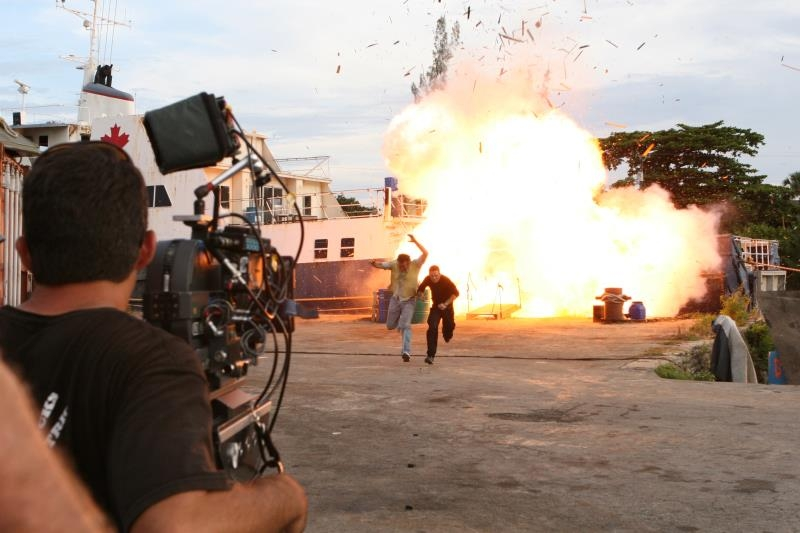
Burn Notice explosion On Set

== Context ==
Because of its climate and the high sunshine amounts, Florida has long been a favoured location for filmmakers, and the early silent film industry in the state rivaled Hollywood's in production. Film in Florida is still a major industry in the state, with Florida ranking third in the U.S. for film production (after California and New York, respectively) based on revenue generated (according to 2006 Florida Film Commission Data. In particular, Miami has long been a popular filming location in Florida and continues to grow as the entertainment industry expands throughout the state.

Worldwide, Miami is one of the largest production and distribution centers for commercial advertising, film, music, new media, still photography, and television industries. The film industry's combined economic impact in the local economy is about two billion dollars annually, with $100 to $150 million coming from more than 1,000 location filming shoots each year. There are approximately 3,000 companies working in film and entertainment in Miami-Dade County, employing an estimated 15,000 workers.

== Spanish-language productions ==
Miami's large Hispanic population and close proximity to Latin America have made Miami a center for Latin television and film production. As a result, many Spanish-language programs are filmed in Miami's numerous television production studios, predominantly in Hialeah and Doral. These include game shows, news programs, reality shows, telenovelas, and variety shows.

== Films set in or shot in Miami ==
=== English-language films set in or shot in Miami ===
Title	Release Year	Notes
2 Fast 2 Furious	2003	Set in Miami, box office #1 film in the U.S.
2 Lava 2 Lantula!	2016	Set in Miami, Fort Lauderdale, and other parts of South Florida
The 5th Wave (film)	2016	
8th & Ocean	2006	
10th Class Diaries	2022	
A Change of Heart (film)	2017	
A Gentleman	2017	Bollywood movie shot in Miami, FL
Absence of Malice	1981	Set and shot in Miami and Coral Gables, including inside the since-demolished Miami Herald building on Biscayne Bay
Absolute Zero	2006	
Ace Ventura: Pet Detective	1994	Set in Miami, #1 in the U.S.
Adaptation	2003	
The Addams Family 2	2021	
Airport '77	1977	
Ali	2001	
Alien Autopsy (2006 film)	2006	
All About the Benjamins	2002	Set in Miami
All the President's Men (film)	1976	
Alvin and the Chipmunks: The Road Chip	2015	
American Rickshaw	1989	
Analyze This	1999	
The Anchor Hotel	1997	
Another Chance (film)	1989	
Any Given Sunday	1999	Set in Miami
Aquamarine	2006	
Assault on a Queen	1966	
Away We Go	2009	
Bachelor Party 2: The Last Temptation	2008	
Bad Boys	1995	Set in Miami, #1 film in U.S.
Bad Boys II	2003	Set in Miami
Bad Boys for Life	2020	Set in Miami
Bad Boys: Ride or Die	2024	Set in Miami
Bad Santa	2003	
Band of the Hand	1986	
Baywatch	2017	Set and shot in South Beach.
Beaches (1988 film)	1988	
The Bellboy	1960	
Belleville Cop	2018	
The Big Short (film)	2015	
The Big Street	1942	
Big Trouble	2002	
The Birdcage	1996	Set in Miami
Black Mass (film)	2015	
The Blackout (1997 film)	1997	
Black Sunday	1977	Adaptation of the novel by Thomas Harris
Blood and Wine	1996	
Blood Feast	1963	
Blood Feast 2: All U Can Eat	2002	
Blood Freak	1972	
Blow	2001	Set in Miami
Bob Marley: One Love	2024	box office #1 film in the U.S.
Body Heat	1981	
The Bodyguard	1992	Set in Miami
Brown Sub, Miami	2017	
Caddyshack	1980	Boating scene filmed in Biscayne Bay; balance of filming done in Broward County
Cape Fear (1991 film)	1991	
Captain Ron	1992	
Carlito's Way	1993	
Case of the Full Moon Murders	1972	
Casino Royale	2006	James Bond film, set in Miami
Cat Chaser	1989	
Catholics vs. Convicts (film)	2016	
Chains of Gold	1991	Set in Miami
The Champ	1979	
The Chase (1946 film)	1946	
Chef	2014	Filmed in multiple locations across the United States, including at the Versailles Cuban Restaurant Miami Florida.
Christmas in Miami	2021	Nigerian Film
Clambake (film)	1967	
Cocaine Cowboys	2006	Set in Miami
Cocaine Cowboys 2	2008	
Cocaine Cowboys: The Kings of Miami	2021	
Cocaine Godmother	2017	
Confessions of a Shopaholic	2008	
The Corpse Had a Familiar Face	1994	
Corpses Are Forever	2003	
Crash	1978	Also known as The Crash of Flight 401
Crazy Mama	1975	
The Crew (2000 film)	2000	
Crime Busters	1977	
Critical Thinking (film)	2020	
The Cutting Edge: Chasing the Dream	2008	
Day of Atonement (film)	1992	
Day of the Dead (1985 film)	1985	Set in the Everglades
The Day of the dolphin	1973	Early scene with George C. Scott boarding boat at the Marina shot at Watson Island
Deep Throat	1972	
Do Revenge	2022	Set in Miami
The Dogs of War (film)	1980	The opening Central American scene was filmed at the Miami Glider Port southwest of Miami, Florida.
Donnie Brasco	1997	Also filmed in New York City
The Doors (film)	1991	
Dostana	2008	The first Bollywood movie to be filmed entirely in Miami, United States
Dr. No (film)	1962	
Drop Zone	1994	
Escape Plan (film)	2013	
Entourage (film)	2015	
Eyes of a Stranger (1981 film)	1981	
Fair Game	1995	
Father Figures	2017	
Father of the Bride (2022 film)	2022	
Firepower (1979 film)	1979	
Flipper (1963 film)	1963	
Flying Down to Rio	1933	The first Fred Astaire and Ginger Rogers film, set in Miami and Rio de Janeiro
Four More Years	1972	
From Justin to Kelly	2003	
The Front Runner (film)	2018	
The Funhouse	1981	
The Galíndez File	2003	
Get Shorty (film)	1995	Set in Miami & Los Angeles
Gentle Ben	2002	
Go for It (1983 film)	1983	
The Godfather Part II	1974	Shot in Miami Beach a bit
Goldfinger	1964	First James Bond film to be filmed in Miami
Golgo 13: Assignment Kowloon	1977	
Goodfellas	1990	
The Great Masquerade	1974	
Gringo Wedding	2006	
Gulliver's Travels (1939 film)	1939	
The Guy from Harlem	1977	
Hard Time (film)	1998	
The Happening	1967	
Harold & Kumar Escape from Guantanamo Bay	2008	Set in Miami
Haunts of the Very Rich	1972	
Haven (film)	2004	
Hazmat (film)	2013	
Heartbreakers (2001 film)	2001	
The Heartbreak Kid (1972 film)	1972	
Hey DJ (film)	2003	
A Hole in the Head	1959	
Holy Man	1998	
Home Alone 2: Lost in New York	1992	
Hot Girls Wanted	2015	
Hot Stuff	1979	
How to Blow Up a Pipeline (film)	2022	
I Am Frankie	2017–Present	Filmed at the Viacom International Studios in Miami
I Love You Phillip Morris	2009	
I'm with Lucy	2002	
Impractical Jokers: The Movie	2020	
The Infiltrator (2016 film)	2016	
In Her Shoes	2005	
In the Shadows (2001 film)	2001	
Invasion U.S.A.	1985	
The Irishman	2019	
Iron Boys - Miami Holiday		
Iron Man 3	2013	Scenes were shot during the daytime inside the Miami Beach Resort at Miami Beach
The Island (1980 film)	1980	
Jagged Mind	2023	
Jaws 2	1978	#1 film in U.S.
The Jungle Trail (1919)	1919	
Just Cause (film)	1995	
Key Largo (film)	1948	
The Killers (1964 film)	1964	
Killing Gunther	2017	
Kings of South Beach	2007	
Knights of the City	1986	
Kung Fury	2015	
Kung Fury 2	2024	
Lady Ice	1973	
Lady In Cement	1968	Stars Frank Sinatra
Last Plane Out	1983	
The Laundromat (2019 film)	2019	
Lenny (film)	1974	
Let It Ride (film)	1989	
The Librarians (2003 film)	2003	
Lionheart (2016 film)	2016	
Live by Night (film)	2016	
The Losers (2010 film)	2010	
The Lotus Eater (film)	1921	
Lucky Me (film)	1954	
Magic City Memoirs	2011	
Major League (film)	1989	
Making Mr. Right	1987	
Manhunter (film)	1986	
Marley and Me	2008	Set in South Florida, filmed in Miami, starring Owen Wilson and Jennifer Aniston
Married to the Mob	1988	Shot in Miami Beach at the end of the Film
The Mean Season	1985	
Meet the Fockers	2004	
Mega Python vs. Gatoroid	2011	Set in Miami and the Everglades
Mega Shark Versus Crocosaurus	2010	
Mental Glitch	2004	Directed by John Walters
Miami (1924 film)	1924	
Miami (2017 film)	2017	Finland Film
Miami Bici	2020	
Miami Blues	1990	Set in Miami
Miami Connection	1987	Set in Miami
Miami Exposé	1956	
Miami Guns	2000	Set in Miami
Miami Rhapsody	1995	Set in Miami
The Miami Story	1954	Set in Miami
Miami Supercops	1985	Italian film shot in Miami
Miami Twice	1991	
Miami Vice	2006	Based on the 1980s television series of the same name, #1 film in the U.S.
Midnight Crossing	1988	
Misfit (1965 film)	1965	
Moonlight	2016	Winner of the Academy Award for best Picture
Moon Over Miami (film)	1941	Set in Miami & Coral Gables
Moonraker (film)	1979	
Murph the Surf (film)	1975	
Mr. Nanny	1993	
The Naked Zoo	1970	Filming took place in Miami and Fort Lauderdale, Florida.
Natale a Miami	2005	
National Lampoon's Pledge This!	2006	
New in Town	2009	Starring Renée Zellweger and Harry Connick Jr.
The Night They Took Miss Beautiful	1977	
Nightmare Beach	1988	
Nobody's Perfekt	1981	
Notorious	1946	Directed by Alfred Hitchcock, starring Cary Grant and Ingrid Bergman
The Notorious Bettie Page	2005	
Nude on the Moon	1961	Filmed in Coral Castle
One Night in Miami...	2020	Set in Miami
Only the Strong (film)	1993	
Operation Dumbo Drop	1995	
Out of Sight	1999	Directed by Steven Soderbergh, starring George Clooney and Jennifer Lopez
Out of Time	2003	Set in Miami
Pain & Gain	2013	Shot in Miami
Parker (2013 film)	2013	
Pepe Vila Body Shop	2003	
The Perez Family	1995	Set in Miami
The Pest	1997	Starring John Leguizamo as Pestario 'Pest' Vargas
Petey Wheatstraw (film)	1977	
Plastic (2014 film)	2014	
Polar (film)	2019	
Police Academy 5: Assignment Miami Beach	1988	Set in Miami
Popi	1969	
Porky's	1982	
Porky's II: The Next Day	1983	
Porky's Revenge!	1985	
Primal Rage (film)	1988	
Q & A (film)	1990	
Quick Pick	2006	Set in Miami
Radio Inside	1994	
Raging Bull	1980	Set in Miami for a bit
Rampage (2006 film)	2006	
Red Eye	2005	Set in Miami
Reminiscence (2021 film)	2021	Set in Miami
Reno 911!: Miami	2007	Set in Miami
Revenge of the Nerds II: Nerds in Paradise	1987	
Ride (1998 film)	1998	
Ride Along 2	2016	Portions filmed in South Beach and Downtown Miami, #1 film in the U.S.
Rock of Ages (2012 film)	2012	
Romeo + Juliet	1996	
The Rosebud Beach Hotel	1984	
Rough Night	2017	
Sabado Gigante		
Sarkaru Vaari Paata	2022	
Satan Was a Lady	2001	
Scarface	1983	Set in Miami & Los Angeles
School for Scoundrels (2006 film)	2006	
Scooby-Doo! Pirates Ahoy!	2006	
Second Honeymoon (1937 film)	1937	
The Shining	1980	
Shock Waves (film)	1977	
Shoot Down	2007	Documentary
Shottas	2002	Partially filmed and set in Miami and Miami Gardens
A Simple Favor (film)	2018	
The Slammin' Salmon	2009	
Slattery's Hurricane	1949	
Smokey and the Bandit II	1980	Portions filmed in Miami's since-demolished Orange Bowl Stadium, #1 film in U.S.
Sniper: Ultimate Kill	2017	
Snow Dogs	2002	
Some Like It Hot	1959	
Something In the Night	2017	
The Specialist	1994	
Speed 2: Cruise Control	1997	#1 film in U.S.
Stanley (1972 film)	1972	Film shot in the Everglades
Step Up Revolution	2012	Set in Miami
Stick	1985	
The Stoolie	1972	
Striptease (film)	1996	
Stuck On You	2003	
The Substitute	1996	Set in Miami
Aladdin	1986	
Super Fuzz	1980	
Switching Channels	1988	
Taste It: A Comedy About the Recession	2012	Set and shot in Miami
That Dick Taste's like Money	2011	Filmed at 180 NE 29th St, Miami, FL 33137, USA
That Kind of Woman	1959	
There's Something About Mary	1998	Set in Miami, #1 in the U.S.
Thirty Seconds Over Tokyo	1944	
Thunderball	1965	James Bond film, set in Miami
Tom and Jerry: Spy Quest	2015	
The Tomorrow War	2021	
Tony Rome	1967	
Transporter 2	2005	Set in Miami, #1 film in U.S.
Triangle (2009 British film)	2009	
True Lies	1994	Set in Miami, #1 in the U.S.
The Turbo Charged Prelude for 2 Fast 2 Furious	2003	Set in Miami
The U (film)	2009	
Under the Cherry Moon	1986	
Up Close & Personal	1996	Set in Miami and Philadelphia
Up in the Air (2009 film)	2009	
The Versace Murder	1998	Set in Miami Beach
Vivo (film)	2021	
War Dogs	2016	Shooting was initially set to begin late April 2015, in Miami, for several weeks
Wasp Network (film)	2019	
We Shall Return	1963	
Where the Boys Are	1960	
Where the Truth Lies	2005	
Whiteout (2009 film)	2009	
Wild Things	1998	Set and shot in Miami
Wild Things 2	2004	Set in Miami
Wild Things: Diamonds in the Rough	2005	Set in Miami
Wild Things: Foursome	2010	Set in Miami
A Woman There Was	1919	
Wrestling Ernest Hemingway	1993	(Portions shot in Biscayne Park Dania Beach and Lake Worth)
Written on the Wind	1956	
X-Men: First Class	2011	
XXX: Return of Xander Cage	2017	Shot in Miami a bit
Young Entrepreneur Society	2009	
Yours for the Asking	1936	

=== Spanish-language films set in or shot in Miami ===
Title	Year	Notes
¡Asu mare! 3	2018	
A+	2004	Filmed throughout Florida
Acorralada	2007	
Amor Comprado	2007–2008	
Angel Rebelde	2004	
Aquamarina		
Bajo las riendas del amor	2007	
Caso Cerrado	2001–present	
Cuidado con el Angel	2008	
Dame Chocolate	2007	
Guadalupe	1994	
Huevos de Oro	1993	
Idol Affair	2024	
Idolos de Juventud	2008	
Inocente de Ti	2004–2005	
Las Brujas de South Beach	2009	
Locos de amor 2	2018	
El Magnate		
Marielena	1994	
Newton's Cradle ("لعبة نيوتن")	2021	filmed in Miami, Florida
Olvidarte Jamas	2005	
Prisionera	2004	
El Rostro de Analía	2008–2009	
Simón (2023 film)	2023	
Soy Libre		
Triunfo del Amor	2010–2011	
Valeria	2009	
Dos Veces Ana	2009	Directed by Sergio Giral

== Television series set in or shot in Miami ==
=== English-language television series set in or shot in Miami ===
Title	Year	Notes
8th & Ocean	2006	MTV reality television series, set in Miami
Alright Already	1997–1998	
American Scene Magazine	1964–1970	First two seasons filmed in New York City, 1962–64; taped in Miami Beach, 1964-1970; officially titled The Jackie Gleason Show
The Amazing Spiez!	2009–2012	French-Canadian children's animated television series
Animal Cops: Miami	2004–2011	Animal Planet reality television series, set in Miami
Austin & Ally	2011–2016	Disney Channel Original Series, set in Miami
Bad Girls Club: Miami	2010, 2013	Seasons 5 and 11 of Oxygen's The Bad Girls Club reality TV show
Ballers	2015–2019	HBO series set in Miami
Basketball Wives	2010–2013	VH1 reality TV series
Bloodline (TV series)	2015–2017	Set in Islamorada, Florida
Bounty Girls: Miami	2007	TruTV reality TV series set in Miami
The Boy In The Golden Kimono		Italian television series
Brooke Knows Best	2008	VH1 reality TV series; a spinoff of Hogan Knows Best
Burn Notice	2007–2013	Set and filmed in Miami
Cane	2007–2008	
The Catalina	2012	The CW reality TV series
Charlie's Angels	2011	Reboot of the 1970s detective series of the same name; set in Miami, produced by ABC
The Crew	1995–1996	
CSI: Miami	2002–2012	Set in Miami
Danger Coast	2010–present	CMT reality TV series set in Miami
Dave's World	1993–1997	
Dexter	2006–2013	Set and filmed partially in Miami
The Ed Sullivan Show	1964	Second episode with the Beatles was filmed in Miami Beach
Empty Nest	1988–1995	Sitcom based in Miami
Eve	2003–2006	Filmed in Miami Beach
Every Witch Way	2014–2015	Nickelodeon, set in Miami
The First 48	2003–2006	A&E reality TV series set in Miami
Flipper	1964–1967, 1995–2000	Filmed in Coral Key
The Glades	2010–2013	Set in Miami
The Golden Girls	1985–1992	Sitcom based in Miami
The Golden Palace	1992–1993	
Good Morning, Miami	2002–2004	In Miami Beach; fictionally based on the workings of a Miami television station
Grapevine	1992, 2000	
Griselda	2024	Netflix miniseries about Griselda Blanco
Heckle and Jeckle	1956	Miami Maniacs
Hogan Knows Best	2005–2007	VH1 reality TV series set in Miami
I Love Lucy	1951–1957	Miami is the backdrop for three episodes; aired originally in 1956
Invasion	2005–2006	Filmed in Homestead
Jane the Virgin	2014–present	CW original series; began airing in 2014
Jersey Shore (Season 2)	2009–2012	MTV reality TV series; Season 2 aired in 2010
Josie and the Pussycats (TV series)	1970	Strangemoon over Miami
Karen Sisco	2003–2004	Spin off from Out of Sight film
Kourtney & Khloe Take Miami	2009–2013	E! reality TV series takeoff on The Kardashians
Law & Order	2011	USA Network
Love & Hip Hop: Miami	2018–Present	VH1
Lost	2004–2010	Various episodes
Magic City	2012–2013	A 1960s Mad Men-esque themed series set in Miami; produced by Starz and local producer Mitch Glazer
Making the Band (Season 4)		MTV reality TV series
Making Jake		Irish reality TV series
Making Menudo		MTV reality TV series
Maximum Bob	1998	
Miami 7	1999	Starring S Club 7; future series were set in Los Angeles and Barcelona
Miami Animal Police	2004–2010	Animal Planet reality television series, set in Miami
Miami Ink	2005–2008	TLC reality television series, set in Miami
Miami Medical	2010	Set in Miami
Miami Social	2009	Bravo reality TV services set in Miami
Miami Vice	1984–1990	Based and filmed in the Miami area
Michael Shayne	1960–1961	Set in Miami, based on the "private eye" character created by Brett Halliday
Moon Over Miami	1993	
Nip/Tuck	2003–2006	Set in Miami
Nurses	1991–1994	
Newton's Cradle ("لعبة نيوتن")	2021	filmed in Miami, Florida
Ocean Ave.	2002–2003	
Odd Man Out	1999–2000	
One World	1998–2001	
Postcards from Buster	2005	PBS Kids Go TV series set in Miami
Privileged	2008–2009	Set in Miami
The Real Housewives of Miami	2011–2013	Bravo reality TV series set in Miami
The Real World: Key West	2006	MTV reality TV series set in Key West
The Real World: Miami	1996	MTV reality TV series set in Miami Beach
Room Raiders	2004–2006	MTV reality TV series set in Miami
Rosewood	2015-2017	Set in Miami
Silk Stalkings	1991–1999	In West Palm Beach
South Beach	1993	Also known as Miami Beach
South Beach	2006	
South Beach Classics	2011	
South Beach Tow	2011–2014	Reality show shot on location in South Beach
Startup	2016	Set in Miami
Surfside 6	1960–1962	In Miami Beach
The Tom and Jerry Comedy Show	1980	Mouse over Miami
Top Chef (season 3)	2007	Bravo reality TV series
Wiseguy	1987–1990	
The X Effect	2007–2009	MTV reality TV series set in Miami
Rap Shit	2022-2023	

=== Spanish-language television series set in or shot in Miami ===
Title	Year	Notes
Newton's Cradle ("لعبة نيوتن")	2021	filmed in Miami, Florida
Club 57	2019	Nickelodeon filmed in Miami
Caso Cerrado ("Case Closed")	2001–present	Reality television series on Telemundo
Cristina	1989–2010	Univision daytime talk show filmed in Miami
Despierta America	1997–present	Univision
Las dos Caras de Ana	2006–2007	
Escándalo TV	2002–present	Telefutura
El Gordo y la Flaca	1998–present	Daytime talk show filmed in Miami
Grachi	2011–2013	Nickelodeon
La reina soy yo	2019	Univision, filmed in Miami
Pecados Ajenos	2007–2008	
Perro amor	2010	Telemundo, filmed in Miami
¿Qué Pasa, USA?	1977–1980	PBS; filmed in Little Havana from 1977 to 1980
¿Quién Tiene la Razón?	2003–present	Telefutura
Sábado Gigante	1986–2015	A Saturday night variety show filmed in Miami and seen throughout the United States, South America, and Europe
Soñar no Cuesta Nada	2005–2006	
Acorralada	2007	Venevisión, filmed in Miami
Valeria	2008–2009	

== Awards shows hosted in Miami ==
In keeping with its modern music tradition, the city has hosted a number of music awards shows:

- Billboard Latin Music Awards (1994) (2023)
- Electronic Dance Music Awards (2024)
- 2025 Electronic Dance Music Awards
- Latin Grammys (2003) (2011)
- Lo Nuestro Awards (Since 1989)
- MTV Video Music Awards (2004 and 2005)

== See also ==
- Film in Miami
- Miami Film Festival
- Miami Short Film Festival
- Miami International Film Festival
- Florida Film Festival
- Florida Film Critics Circle
- Cinema of Florida
- Film industry in Florida
- List of films and television shows shot in Florida
