= List of films and television shows shot in Florida =

The state of Florida in the United States is a popular location for the filming and setting of movies and television shows, both fictional and non-fictional. The following article provides a list of films and television shows which have been partially or wholly set in or shot in Florida. The listed shows span a wide variety of genres and range from shows almost entirely shot and set in one city (e.g., Miami for The Golden Girls and Miami Vice) to those containing only a small number of scenes shot or set in Florida (e.g., Lost and Moonraker.

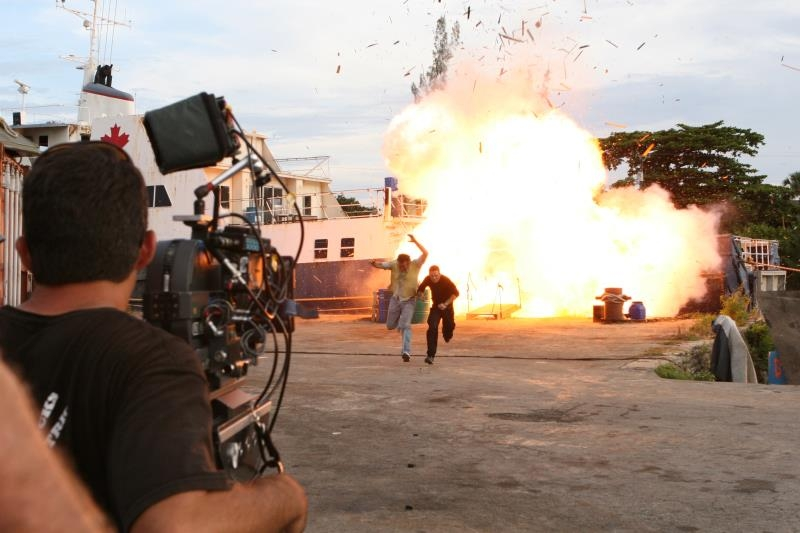
Burn Notice explosion On Set

== Films set in or shot in Miami ==
Title	Release Year	Notes
2 Fast 2 Furious	2003	Set in Miami
2 Lava 2 Lantula!	2016	Set in Miami, Fort Lauderdale, and other parts of South Florida
8th & Ocean	2006	
A+	2013	Filmed throughout Florida
Absence of Malice	1981	Set and shot in Miami and Coral Gables, including inside the since-demolished Miami Herald building on Biscayne Bay
Absolute Zero	2006	
Ace Ventura: Pet Detective	1994	Set in Miami
Adaptation	2003	
Ali	2001	
All About the Benjamins	2002	Set in Miami
Any Given Sunday	1999	Set in Miami
Bad Boys	1995	Set in Miami
Bad Boys II	2003	Set in Miami
Bad Boys for Life	2020	Set in Miami
Band of the Hand	1986	
Baywatch	2017	Set and shot in South Beach.
The Bellboy	1960	
Big Trouble	2002	
The Birdcage	1996	Set in Miami
Black Sunday	1977	Adaptation of the novel by Thomas Harris
Blood and Wine	1996	
Blow	2001	Set in Miami
Body Heat	1981	
The Bodyguard	1992	Set in Miami
Brown Sub, Miami		
Caddyshack	1980	Boating scene filmed in Biscayne Bay; balance of filming done in Broward County
Casino Royale	2006	James Bond film, set in Miami
The Champ	1979	
Chef	2014	Filmed in multiple locations across the United States. California, Texas, Louisiana & Filmed at the Versailles Cuban Restaurant Miami Florida.
Cocaine Cowboys	2006	Set in Miami
Confessions of a Shopaholic	2008	
Crash	1978	Also known as The Crash of Flight 401
Crime Busters	1977	
The Day of the dolphin	1973	Early scene with George C. Scott boarding boat at the Marina shot at Watson Island
Deep Throat	1972	
Donnie Brasco	1997	Also filmed in New York City
Dostana	2008	The first Bollywood movie to be filmed entirely in Miami, United States
Drop Zone	1994	Some scenes shot near Miami and in the Florida Keys
Fair Game	1995	
Flying Down to Rio	1933	The first Fred Astaire and Ginger Rogers film, set in Miami and Rio de Janeiro
From Justin to Kelly	2003	
The Funhouse	1981	
The Galindez File		
Gentle Ben	2002	
Goldfinger	1964	First James Bond film to be filmed in Miami
Gringo Wedding		
The Happening	1967	
Harold & Kumar Escape from Guantanamo Bay	2008	Set in Miami
A Hole in the Head	1959	
Holy Man	1998	
Hot Stuff	1979	
I Am Frankie	2017–Present	Filmed at the Viacom International Studios in Miami
In Her Shoes	2005	
Invasion U.S.A.	1985	
Iron Boys - Miami Holiday		
Iron Man 3	2013	Scenes were shot during the daytime inside the Miami Beach Resort at Miami Beach
Knights of the City	1986	
Lady In Cement	1968	Stars Frank Sinatra
Making Mr. Right	1987	
Marley and Me	2008	Set in South Florida, filmed in Miami, starring Owen Wilson and Jennifer Aniston
The Mean Season	1985	
Meet the Fockers	2004	
Mega Python vs. Gatoroid	2011	Set in Miami and the Everglades
Mental Glitch		Directed by John Walters
Miami Blues	1990	Set in Miami
Miami Guns	2000	Set in Miami
Miami Rhapsody	1995	Set in Miami
The Miami Story	1954	Set in Miami
Miami Vice	2006	Based on the 1980s television series of the same name
Moonlight	2016	Winner of the Academy Award for best Picture
Mr. Nanny	1993	
New in Town	2009	Starring Renée Zellweger and Harry Connick Jr.
Nightmare Beach	1988	
Notorious	1946	Directed by Alfred Hitchcock, starring Cary Grant and Ingrid Bergman
Nude on the Moon	1961	Filmed in Coral Castle
Out of Sight	1999	Directed by Steven Soderbergh, starring George Clooney and Jennifer Lopez
Out of Time	2003	Set in Miami
Pain & Gain	2013	Shot in Miami
Pepe Vila Body Shop	2003	
The Pest	1997	Starring John Leguizamo as Pestario 'Pest' Vargas
Police Academy 5: Assignment Miami Beach	1988	Set in Miami
Popi	1969	
Porky's	1982	
Porky's II: The Next Day	1983	
Quick Pick	2006	Set in Miami
Red Eye	2005	Set in Miami
Reno 911!: Miami	2007	Set in Miami
Revenge of the Nerds II: Nerds in Paradise	1987	
Ride Along 2	2016	Portions filmed in South Beach and Downtown Miami
Sabado Gigante		
Satan Was a Lady		
Scarface	1983	Set in Miami
The Shining	1980	
Shoot Down	2007	Documentary
Shottas	2002	Partially filmed and set in Miami and Miami Gardens
Smokey and the Bandit II	1980	Portions filmed in Miami's since-demolished Orange Bowl Stadium
Snow Dogs	2002	
Something In the Night		
The Specialist	1994	
Step Up Revolution	2012	Set in Miami
Stick	1985	
Stuck On You	2003	
The Substitute	1996	Set in Miami
Super Fuzz	1980	
Taste It: A Comedy About the Recession	2012	Set and shot in Miami
That Dick Taste's like Money	2011	Filmed at 180 NE 29th St, Miami, FL 33137, USA
There's Something About Mary	1998	Set in Miami
Thunderball	1965	James Bond film, set in Miami
Tony Rome	1967	
Transporter 2	2005	Set in Miami
True Lies	1994	Set in Miami
Up Close & Personal	1996	Set in Miami and Philadelphia
War Dogs	2016	
Where the Boys Are	1960	
Wild Things	1998	Set and shot in Miami
Wild Things 2	2004	Set in Miami
Wild Things: Diamonds in the Rough	2005	Set in Miami
Wild Things: Foursome	2010	Set in Miami
Wrestling Ernest Hemingway	1993	(Portions shot in Biscayne Park Dania Beach and Lake Worth)
Young Entrepreneur Society	2009	
