= King's Ransom (film) =

- Theatrical poster
- Directed by: Jeffrey W. Byrd
- Written by: Wayne Conley
- Produced by: Darryl Taja
- Starring: Anthony Anderson; Jay Mohr; Kellita Smith; Nicole Parker; Regina Hall; Loretta Devine; Donald Faison; Charlie Murphy; Brooke D'Orsay; Leila Arcieri
- Cinematography: Robert McLachlan
- Edited by: Jeffrey Cooper
- Music by: Marcus Miller
- Distributed by: New Line Cinema
- Release date: April 22, 2005
- Running time: 95 minutes
- Country: United States
- Language: English
- Budget: $15 million
- Box office: $4.1 million

King's Ransom is a 2005 American black comedy film directed by Jeffrey W. Byrd and written by Wayne Conley. It stars Anthony Anderson, Jay Mohr, Kellita Smith, Regina Hall, Donald Faison, Nicole Ari Parker, Charlie Murphy, Loretta Devine, Brooke D'Orsay, and Leila Arcieri. The film was released in the United States on April 22, 2005, and was a critical and commercial bomb.

== Plot ==
Malcolm King is a wealthy, selfish, obnoxious businessman who is about to divorce his wife Renee. She plans to ruin him financially during the court proceedings, and King is willing to do anything to protect his fortune.

He enlists his mistress, Peaches, and her brother, Herb, to stage a mock kidnapping. They are to make and receive a huge ransom demand, which would keep the money safe from his wife.

Unfortunately for him, two other people have similar plans to kidnap him; Angela, an aggrieved employee and Corey, a good-natured yet hapless nobody who lives in his grandmother's basement and needs $10,000 after being threatened by his adopted sister.

== Cast ==
- Anthony Anderson as Malcolm King
- Jay Mohr as Corey
- Kellita Smith as Renee King
- Donald Faison as Andre
- Regina Hall as Peaches Clarke
- Nicole Ari Parker as Angela Drake
- Loretta Devine as Miss Gladys
- Charlie Murphy as Herb Clarke
- Leila Arcieri as Kim Baker
- Brooke D'Orsay as Brooke Mayo
- Roger Cross as Byron
- Jackie Burroughs as Granny
- Christian Potenza as Officer Holland
- Lawrence Dane as Detective Conley
- Lisa Marcos as Raven
- Robert Norman Smith as David
- Brenda Chrichlow as Anita
- Carrie Colak as Lori
- Kwasi Songui as Ronald
- Ingrid Hart as Sheila
- Luis Oliva as Pablo
- Ilona Elkin as Rachel
- Nicolas Wright as Timmy
- Lila Yee as Miss Ho

== Production ==
=== Writing ===
The screenplay was written by Wayne Conley — who was a writer for the Nickelodeon series Kenan & Kel, a live-action series that aired Nickelodeon from 1996 to 2000.

=== Filming ===
Filming took place around 2004. The film was produced on a $15 million budget.

== Release ==
King's Ransom was released in 1,508 theaters on April 22, 2005.

== Reception ==
=== Box office ===
King's Ransom was a huge box office disappointment, having $1,417 average. In its opening weekend, the film ranked 10th at the box office and grossed only $2,137,685. By the end of its run on June 2, 2005, it had grossed $4,008,527 in the domestic market, and $135,125 in the foreign market for a worldwide total of $4,143,652.

=== Critical response ===
On the review aggregator website Rotten Tomatoes, 0% of 43 critics' reviews are positive, with an average rating of 2.4/10. The website's consensus reads: "Filled with crass dialogue, unlikable characters, and overdone slapstick gags, King's Ransom is an utterly inept would-be comedy." Metacritic, which uses a weighted average, assigned the film a score of 11 out of 100, based on 13 critics, indicating "overwhelming dislike". Audiences polled by CinemaScore gave the film an average grade of "C+" on an A+ to F scale.
