= Mandalay Pictures =

American film production company founded in 1995

- Logo used since 1995
- Formerly: Mandalay Entertainment (1994–1999)
- Type: Subsidiary
- Industry: Motion pictures
- Founded: September 30, 1994; 31 years ago
- Founder: Peter Guber
- Headquarters: Los Angeles County, California, United States
- Parent: Mandalay Entertainment (1994–1997, 2002–present); Lions Gate Films (1997–2002)
- Divisions: Mandalay Vision
- Website: www.mandalay.com

Mandalay Pictures is an American independent film production company founded on September 30, 1994, which is a division of producer Peter Guber's Mandalay Entertainment. From 1997 until 2002, Lions Gate Entertainment owned a stake in Mandalay Pictures before selling it. The company's mascot is a tiger.

== History ==
Mandalay Pictures was formed at the same time as the parent company Mandalay Entertainment in 1994 by Peter Guber, who was formerly head of Sony Pictures Entertainment and The Guber-Peters Company. At first, it struck an exclusive film and television deal with Sony Pictures Entertainment, which was releasing its films through the Columbia and TriStar distribution labels in most countries. Summit Entertainment signed a deal with Mandalay to serve as its foreign sales agent, helping arrange output deals including Entertainment Film Distributors in the United Kingdom and Ireland, Village Roadshow in Australia, New Zealand and Greece, Constantin Film in Germany and Austria, SKC in South Korea, Tripictures in Spain and the Cecchi Gori Group in Italy.

The company's initial head was Todd Black, who was president of production fresh off its partnerships with Joe Wizan and Randa Haines, who supervised motion pictures, and joined by Jason Blumenthal, his close friend, who was senior VP of production. Both Black and Blumenthal left Mandalay in 1998, and formed its own independent company, Black & Blu, at Sony Pictures Entertainment.

In 1998, Mandalay Pictures moved over from Sony Pictures to Paramount Pictures. At the same time, Mandalay struck a partnership with Lions Gate Entertainment to acquire the assets of Mandalay Entertainment. The deal did not include the television division, which remained with Columbia TriStar Television. In September 1998, Mandalay signed a distribution deal with Canal+ and Pathé joint-venture C+P to handle distribution of Mandalay's films in the United Kingdom, France and Belgium/Luxembourg.

In 2002, the deal was transferred from Paramount Pictures to Universal Pictures, and launched its international sales division. In November 2002, it was separated from Lions Gate Entertainment.

In 2004, Ori Marmur left Mandalay Pictures, and decided to join Original Film. Ironically, Original Film is producing the I Know What You Did Last Summer movies for Mandalay Pictures.

In 2007, it launched a division Mandalay Independent Pictures, and it was to focus on making independent films. In 2010, it became Mandalay Vision and Matthew Rhodes was appointed president in 2011.

== Films ==
=== Theatrical films ===
==== 1990s ====
Release date	Title	Notes	Budget	Gross (worldwide)
August 16, 1996	The Fan	co-production with Scott Free Productions and TriStar Pictures	$55 million	$18.6 million
February 28, 1997	Donnie Brasco	co-production with Baltimore Pictures and Mark Johnson Productions; distributed by Sony Pictures Releasing under the TriStar Pictures label	$35 million	$124.9 million
April 4, 1997	Double Team	co-production with Cine Story Pictures; distributed by Sony Pictures Releasing under the Columbia Pictures label	$30 million	$11.5 million
October 10, 1997	Seven Years in Tibet	co-production with Reperage Productions, Vanguard Films and Applecross Productions; distributed by Sony Pictures Releasing under the TriStar Pictures label	$70 million	$131.5 million
October 17, 1997	I Know What You Did Last Summer	co-production with Original Film; distributed by Sony Pictures Releasing under the Columbia Pictures label	$17 million	$125.2 million
January 30, 1998	Desperate Measures	co-production with Eaglepoint Productions; distributed by Sony Pictures Releasing under the TriStar Pictures label	$50 million	$13.8 million
March 20, 1998	Wild Things	distributed by Sony Pictures Releasing under the Columbia Pictures label	$20 million	$56 million
May 1, 1998	Les Miserables	co-production with Sarah Radclyffe Productions and James Gorman Productions; distributed by Sony Pictures Releasing under the Columbia Pictures label	N/A	$14.1 million
August 21, 1998	Dance with Me	co-production with Weissman/Egawa Productions; distributed by Sony Pictures Releasing under the Columbia Pictures label	N/A	$15.9 million
November 13, 1998	I Still Know What You Did Last Summer	co-production with Original Film and Columbia Pictures	$24 million	$84 million
January 22, 1999	Gloria	co-production with Eagle Point Productions; distributed by Sony Pictures Releasing under the Columbia Pictures label	$30 million	$4.2 million
March 12, 1999	The Deep End of the Ocean	co-production with Via Rosa Productions; distributed by Sony Pictures Releasing under the Columbia Pictures label	$38 million	$28.1 million
October 27, 1999	Galapagos	as Mandalay Media Arts; co-production with IMAX	N/A	N/A
November 19, 1999	Sleepy Hollow	co-production with Scott Rudin Productions, American Zoetrope and Tim Burton Productions; distributed by Paramount Pictures	$70 million	$207 million

==== 2000s ====
Release date	Title	Notes	Budget	Gross (worldwide)
March 16, 2001	Enemy at the Gates	co-production with Reperage Films; distributed by Paramount Pictures	$68 million	$97 million
July 13, 2001	The Score	co-production with Horseshoe Bay Productions; distributed by Paramount Pictures	$68 million	$113 million
August 23, 2002	Serving Sara	co-production with Illusion Productions and Halsted Pictures; distributed by Paramount Pictures	$29 million	$20.1 million
October 24, 2003	Beyond Borders	co-production with Camelot Pictures; distributed by Paramount Pictures	$35 million	$11.7 million
March 4, 2005	The Jacket	co-production with 2929 Entertainment and Section Eight Productions; distributed by Warner Independent Pictures	$29 million	$21.1 million
September 30, 2005	Into the Blue	co-production with Metro-Goldwyn-Mayer Pictures and Columbia Pictures	$50 million	$44.4 million
March 14, 2008	Never Back Down	as Mandalay Independent Pictures; co-production with BMP, Inc. and Summit Entertainment	$20 million	$41.6 million

==== 2010s ====
Release date	Title	Notes	Budget	Gross (worldwide)
July 30, 2010	The Kids Are All Right	as Mandalay Vision; co-production with Gilbert Films, Saint Aire Productions, Artist International, 10th Hole Productions and Antidote Films; distributed by Focus Features	$4 million	$34.7 million
February 18, 2011	Vanishing on 7th Street	as Mandalay Vision; co-production with Herrick Entertainment; distributed by Magnet Releasing	$10 million	$1 million
April 8, 2011	Soul Surfer	as Mandalay Vision; co-production with TriStar Pictures, FilmDistrict, Brookwell McNamara Entertainment, Island Film Group, Enticing Entertainment, Affirm Films and Life's a Beach Entertainment; distributed by Sony Pictures Releasing	$18 million	$47.1 million
November 18, 2011	Another Happy Day	as Mandalay Vision; co-production with Voltage Pictures, Taggart Productions, Cineric, Fimula Entertainment, New Mexico Media Partners, and Prop Blast Films; distributed by Phase 4 Films		
April 27, 2012	Bernie	as Mandalay Vision; co-production with Castle Rock Entertainment, Wind Dancer Films, Detour Filmproduction, Collins House Productions and Horsethief Pictures; distributed by Millennium Entertainment	$6 million	$10.1 million
August 22, 2014	When the Game Stands Tall	co-production with TriStar Pictures and Affirm Films; distributed by Sony Pictures Releasing	$15 million	$30.1 million
October 6, 2014	Horns	co-production with Red Granite Pictures; distributed by Dimension Films and RADiUS-TWC	N/A	$3.9 million
February 6, 2015	The Voices	as Mandalay Vision; co-production with 1984 Private Defense Contractors, Babelsberg Studio and Vertigo Entertainment, distributed by Lionsgate	$11 million	$444,196
August 7, 2015	Dark Places	co-production with Exclusive Media Group and Denver and Delilah Productions; distributed by A24	$20 million	$3.5 million
October 7, 2016	The Birth of a Nation	co-production with Bron Studios, Phantom Four and Tiny Giant Entertainment; distributed by Fox Searchlight Pictures	$8.5 million	$16.8 million
September 29, 2017	Mark Felt: The Man Who Brought Down the White House	co-production with Endurance Media Ventures, Torridon Films, Riverstone Pictures, MadRiver Pictures, Scott Free Productions and Cara Films; distributed by Sony Pictures Classics	N/A	$1.8 million
March 23, 2018	Paul, Apostle of Christ	co-production with Affirm Films and ODB Films; distributed by Sony Pictures Releasing	$5 million	$25.5 million

==== 2020s ====
Release date	Title	Notes	Budget	Gross (worldwide)
July 30, 2021	Nine Days	co-production with Juniper Productions, MACRO and Nowhere; distributed by Sony Pictures Classics	$10 million	$967,662
April 5, 2023	Air	co-production with Amazon Studios, Skydance Sports and Artists Equity; distributed by Amazon Studios	$70–90 million	$90 million
April 28, 2023	Big George Foreman	co-production with Affirm Films and State Street Pictures; distributed by Sony Pictures Releasing	$32 million	$6 million
August 15, 2025	Highest 2 Lowest	co-production with A24, Escape Artists and 40 Acres and a Mule Filmworks; limited theatrical release before being released by Apple TV+		
November 6, 2026	Ghost Soldier	distributed by Sony Pictures Releasing under Columbia Pictures		

=== Direct-to-video and streaming films ===
==== 2000s ====
Release date	Title	Notes
April 20, 2004	Wild Things 2	co-production with TriStar Pictures and Destination Films; released by Columbia TriStar Home Entertainment
April 26, 2005	Wild Things: Diamond in the Rough	co-production with Destination Films; released by Sony Pictures Home Entertainment
August 15, 2006	I'll Always Know What You Did Last Summer	co-production with Destination Films and Original Film; released by Sony Pictures Home Entertainment
April 21, 2009	Into the Blue 2: The Reef	co-production with MGM Television; released by 20th Century Fox Home Entertainment

==== 2010s ====
Release date	Title	Notes
June 1, 2010	Wild Things: Foursome	co-production with Stage 6 Films and RCR Media Group; released by Sony Pictures Home Entertainment
September 13, 2011	Never Back Down 2: The Beatdown	co-production with Stage 6 Films; released by Sony Pictures Home Entertainment
June 7, 2016	Never Back Down: No Surrender	co-production with Destination Films; released by Sony Pictures Home Entertainment
March 10, 2017	Burning Sands	co-production with Homegrown Pictures, Hudlin Entertainment and Freedom Road Productions, released by Netflix
September 1, 2017	Little Evil	co-production with Bluegrass Films; released by Netflix
April 6, 2018	Amateur	released by Netflix
January 18, 2019	Io	co-production with Sunset Junction Entertainment, Untitled Entertainment and Great Point Media, released by Netflix
March 8, 2019	Juanita	co-production with Homegrown Pictures; released by Netflix
August 2, 2019	Otherhood	co-production with Welle Entertainment; released by Netflix

==== 2020s ====
Release date	Title	Notes
March 27, 2020	Uncorked	co-production with Forge Media and Argent Pictures; released by Netflix
June 5, 2020	The Last Days of American Crime	co-production with Radical Studios; released by Netflix
November 16, 2021	Never Back Down: Revolt	co-production with Destination Films; released by Sony Pictures Home Entertainment
January 13, 2022	Brazen	co-production with Eponymous Production; released by Netflix
April 2, 2023	Surrounded	co-production with Bron Studios, Blackhand Pictures and 3.16 Productions; released by Metro-Goldwyn-Mayer
December 6, 2024	The Six Triple Eight	co-production with Her Excellency Productions, Intuition Productions, and Tyler Perry Studios; released by Netflix

==== Upcoming ====
Release date	Title	Notes
TBA	Shucked	Written by Robert Horn. Produced by Jason Michael Berman, Alan Fox, Jordan Moldo, Brandy Clark and Shane McAnally

=== Short films ===
Release date	Title	Notes
2016	Choke	co-production with Hermano Films
