= Death Toll =

- Theatrical poster
- Directed by: Phenomenon
- Written by: Daniel Garcia; Anthony Faia III; Jason Hewitt
- Produced by: DMX; Daniel Garcia
- Starring: DMX; Lou Diamond Phillips; Keshia Knight Pulliam; Leila Arcieri
- Cinematography: Michael Campbell; Jerrod Coates
- Edited by: Scott Mele; Donald Ray Washington
- Music by: Kane & Abel
- Production companies: HK Pictures; Most Wanted Films; K2 Pictures; Films in Motion
- Distributed by: Spotlight Pictures
- Release dates: January 30, 2008 (Greece); April 15, 2008 (United States)
- Running time: 90 minutes
- Country: United States
- Language: English
- Budget: $3.5 million

Death Toll is a 2008 action film starring DMX, Lou Diamond Phillips, Alec Rayme, Leila Arcieri and Keshia Knight Pulliam, written and produced by Daniel Garcia and directed by Phenomenon. Filming was done in Louisiana in New Orleans and Baton Rouge.

== Plot ==
A powerful drug dealer has taken control of New Orleans, but as the authorities scramble to stop the bloodshed, things only get worse. "The Dog" (DMX) is a drug dealer who will stop at nothing to be the number one dealer in the Big Easy. He is ruthless and his power is far reaching. However, the authorities are onto "The Dog". Will they accomplish their mission before any more innocent lives are lost, or could it be that New Orleans' top dog is truly above the law?

== Cast ==
- Lou Diamond Phillips as Mayor Padial
- DMX as The Dog
- Keshia Knight Pulliam as Mirie
- Leila Arcieri as Detective Bathgate
- Alec Rayme as Detective Coulon
- Daniel Garcia as Carmello
- Sleman Sol Virani as The Dominican
- Lisa Marie Dupree as Agent Manning
- Margo Swisher as AUSA Stone
- Oneal A. Isaac as Chief Newsome
- Gene Christensen as Councilmen McGraw
- Jeff Galpin as Special Agent Sax

== Reception ==
DVD Verdict panned Death Toll, stating that it was "a collection of moving images that makes little sense and boasts the entertainment value of a wasp sting to the genitals."

Dutch language Cinemagazine spoke of the film sharing a great deal of violence, and expanded that the story was not as good as it might have been. A large cast and quick cuts between cast action sequences and a weak script marred the viewer's attention.

== See also ==
- List of hood films
