= Stage 6 Films =

American film production company

Stage 6 Films, Inc.
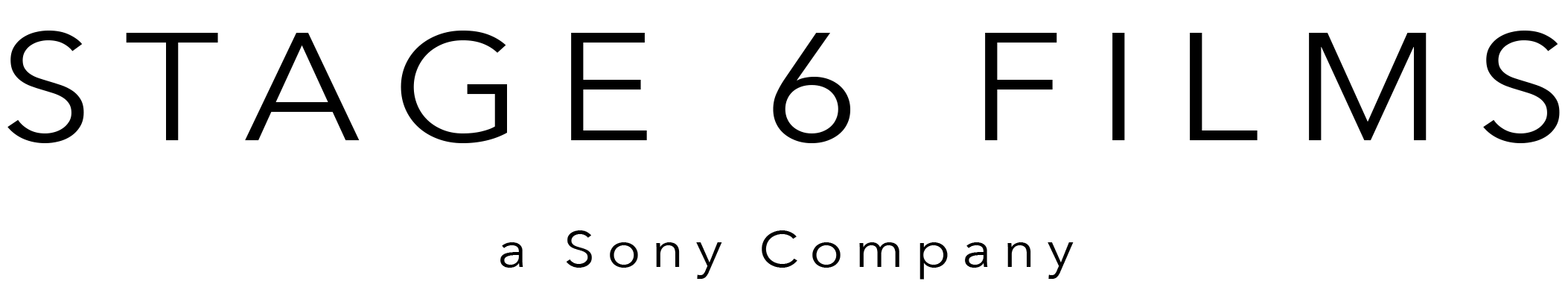
- Logo used since 2025
- Type: Label
- Industry: Film
- Predecessor: TriStar Pictures; Triumph Films; Destination Films
- Founded: October 9, 2007; 19 years ago
- Headquarters: Sony Pictures Studios, Culver City, California, United States
- Area served: Worldwide
- Key people: Joseph Matukewicz (president, Sony Pictures Worldwide Acquisitions)
- Products: Motion pictures
- Parent: Sony Pictures Worldwide Acquisitions
- Website: stage6films.com

Stage 6 Films, Inc. is an American production and distribution label of Sony Pictures that acquires and produces feature films to be released either theatrically, on demand, or through streaming services. Once a film is finished, Sony Pictures Worldwide Acquisitions will decide if the film will be released theatrically or on a different platform.

Founded in 2007, the film division takes its name from the location of its main office, the Stage 6 building at Sony Pictures Studios in Culver City, California (originally an actual sound stage used for such films as The Wizard of Oz). Before that, the functions were taken by TriStar Pictures, Triumph Films, and Destination Films.

== Filmography ==
=== 2000s ===
Release date	Title	Notes
November 29, 2007	Missionary Man	
February 12, 2008	Three Can Play That Game	
March 4, 2008	Pistol Whipped	
March 4, 2008	The Shepherd: Border Patrol	
March 18, 2008	Conspiracy	
March 25, 2008	April Fool's Day	
April 15, 2008	Impulse	
April 18, 2008	Zombie Strippers	distributed by Triumph Films
July 15, 2008	Insanitarium	
July 18, 2008	Felon	
July 26, 2008	Anaconda 3: Offspring	
August 5, 2008	Starship Troopers 3: Marauder	
August 12, 2008	The Art of War II: Betrayal	
October 21, 2008	Linewatch	
October 24, 2008	Vacancy 2: The First Cut	
November 1, 2008	Center Stage: Turn It Up	co-production with Laurence Mark Productions
December 12, 2008	The Sky Crawlers	US distribution only
January 20, 2009	Boogeyman 3	co-production with Ghost House Pictures
January 23, 2009	The Lodger	
February 24, 2009	Red Sands	
February 28, 2009	Anacondas: Trail of Blood	
May 12, 2009	The Grudge 3	US distribution only, co-production with Ghost House Pictures
June 12, 2009	Moon	first theatrical film; co-distribution in North and Latin America, the U.K., Ireland, Australia, New Zealand, South Africa, Spain, Italy and Asia excluding Korea with Sony Pictures Classics only
June 13, 2009	Hachi: A Dog's Tale	US distribution only
July 21, 2009	Messengers 2: The Scarecrow	US distribution only, co-production with Ghost House Pictures
October 6, 2009	Dark Country	
November 3, 2009	Hardwired	
December 11, 2009	The Boondock Saints II: All Saints Day	

=== 2010s ===
Release date	Title	Notes
February 9, 2010	Ice Castles	
June 1, 2010	Wild Things: Foursome	produced by Mandalay Pictures and RCR Media Group
June 8, 2010	Not the Messiah (He's a Very Naughty Boy)	
August 21, 2010	Lake Placid 3	
September 21, 2010	The Experiment	
September 21, 2010	Stomp the Yard: Homecoming	
October 5, 2010	30 Days of Night: Dark Days	co-production with Ghost House Pictures
February 15, 2011	Game of Death	co-production with Voltage Pictures and Perpetual Entertainment
March 1, 2011	S.W.A.T.: Firefight	co-distributed by RCR Media Group
April 1, 2011	Insidious	U.S. co-distribution with FilmDistrict only
April 22, 2011	The Greatest Movie Ever Sold	North American co-distribution with Sony Pictures Classics only
April 26, 2011	Sniper: Reloaded	
May 6, 2011	Jumping the Broom	distributed by TriStar Pictures
May 10, 2011	The Hit List	co-production with Up Load Films and Motion Picture Corporation of America
June 17, 2011	Quarantine 2: Terminal	
July 29, 2011	Attack the Block	North and Latin American, South African and Eastern European co-distribution with Screen Gems only
August 26, 2011	Colombiana	North and Latin American co-distribution with TriStar Pictures only
September 2, 2011	A Good Old Fashioned Orgy	North American, Australian and New Zealand distribution only; co-distributed in the U.S. with Samuel Goldwyn Films
September 13, 2011	Never Back Down 2: The Beatdown	produced by Mandalay Pictures
October 11, 2011	Arena	
December 27, 2011	Hostel: Part III	co-production with RCR Media Group
March 23, 2012	The Raid: Redemption	US, Latin American and Spanish co-distribution with Sony Pictures Classics only
May 11, 2012	Tonight You're Mine	North American co-distribution excluding airlines with Roadside Attractions only
July 24, 2012	Meeting Evil	theatrical distribution by Magnolia Pictures; produced by Destination Films
August 7, 2012	Bel Ami	North American distribution only; theatrically distributed by Magnolia Pictures
August 17, 2012	Sparkle	co-distributed by TriStar Pictures
August 17, 2012	Robot & Frank	distribution in all media excluding airlines and cruises in North and Latin America, Eastern Europe, the Baltics, the CIS, Scandinavia, Australia, New Zealand and South Africa only; co-distributed by Samuel Goldwyn Films
August 28, 2012	Starship Troopers: Invasion	
November 6, 2012	The Swan Princess Christmas	produced by Nest Family Entertainment and Crest Animation Studios
March 15, 2013	The Call	North American, Scandinavian and South African co-distribution with TriStar Pictures only
August 16, 2013	Austenland	co-distributed by Sony Pictures Classics; produced by Fickle Fish Films and Maxie Pictures
September 13, 2013	Insidious: Chapter 2	distribution outside the U.S. theatrically, the U.K., Ireland and Spain only; co-production with Entertainment One and Blumhouse Productions
January 10, 2014	Cold Comes the Night	co-distributed by Samuel Goldwyn Films; produced by Syncopated Films
February 25, 2014	The Swan Princess: A Royal Family Tale	produced by Nest Family Entertainment and Crest Animation Studios
March 28, 2014	The Raid 2	U.S., Latin American and Spanish co-distribution with Sony Pictures Classics only; produced by Merantau Film and XYZ Films
July 15, 2014	Appleseed Alpha	produced by Sola Films
August 29, 2014	The Calling	
January 9, 2015	Predestination	distribution in North and Latin America, the Benelux, France, Spain, Scandinavia, Eastern Europe, South Africa, Greece and Cyprus only
March 13, 2015	Home Sweet Hell	co-distributed in the U.S. theatrically by Vertical Entertainment
May 8, 2015	The D Train	distributed in the U.S. by IFC Films
June 5, 2015	Insidious: Chapter 3	distribution outside the U.S. theatrically, the U.K., Ireland and Spain only; co-production with Entertainment One and Blumhouse Productions
October 9, 2015	The Final Girls	co-distributed in the U.S. theatrically by Vertical Entertainment
March 11, 2016	Hello, My Name Is Doris	co-distributed in the U.S. theatrically by Roadside Attractions
March 18, 2016	The Bronze	co-distributed by Sony Pictures Classics
April 22, 2016	The Meddler	co-distributed by Sony Pictures Classics
August 2, 2016	Sniper: Ghost Shooter	
August 12, 2016	Beyond Valkyrie: Dawn of the 4th Reich	
August 19, 2016	Kingsglaive: Final Fantasy XV	distribution outside Japan only; co-distributed by Square Enix, produced by Visual Works, Digic Pictures, and Image Engine
August 26, 2016	Don't Breathe	co-distributed by Screen Gems
June 19, 2017	Resident Evil: Vendetta	
August 21, 2017	Starship Troopers: Traitor of Mars	
October 13, 2017	Professor Marston and the Wonder Women	distributed in the U.S. theatrically by Annapurna Pictures
November 7, 2017	November Criminals	distribution across worldwide airlines and outside Italy and Asia excluding India only; co-distributed by Vertical Entertainment in the U.S.
December 22, 2017	Crooked House	distribution in all media excluding airlines in North and Latin America, Eastern Europe, Scandinavia, South Africa and India only; co-distributed by Vertical Entertainment in the U.S.
January 5, 2018	Insidious: The Last Key	distribution outside the U.S. theatrically only; U.S theatrical distribution by Universal Pictures; co-production with Blumhouse Productions
June 22, 2018	Boundaries	co-distributed by Sony Pictures Classics
August 24, 2018	Searching	co-distributed by Screen Gems
September 20, 2018	Ladies in Black	
November 6, 2018	The Front Runner	co-distributed by Columbia Pictures
March 1, 2019	The Wedding Guest	distributed in the U.S. by IFC Films
April 19, 2019	Family	distributed in the U.S. by the Film Arcade
May 24, 2019	Brightburn	co-distributed by Screen Gems

=== 2020s ===
Release date	Title	Notes
January 3, 2020	The Grudge	co-distributed by Screen Gems
July 10, 2020	Greyhound	distributed by Apple TV+
September 11, 2020	The Broken Hearts Gallery	co-distribution outside Canada with TriStar Pictures only
September 25, 2020	The Last Shift	
October 9, 2020	Yellow Rose	distribution outside the Philippines only
October 16, 2020	The Kid Detective	distribution outside Canada only; produced by Woods Entertainment, JoBro Productions, and Aqute Media
February 12, 2021	French Exit	co-distribution across worldwide airlines and outside Canada and Switzerland with Sony Pictures Classics only
March 12, 2021	Long Weekend	distribution only; produced by Fifty Seventh Productions, Rebelle Media, Park Pictures and Invisible Pictures
May 7, 2021	Here Today	distribution only; produced by Astute Films, Big Head Productions, and Face Productions
June 25, 2021	I Carry You with Me	co-distributed by Sony Pictures Classics
August 13, 2021	Don't Breathe 2	co-distributed by Screen Gems
October 29, 2021	A Mouthful of Air	distribution only; produced by Maven Screen Media, Ice Cream & Whiskey, Off Media, Carte Blanche and Studio Mao
December 3, 2021	Death of a Telemarketer	distribution only; distributed in the U.S. theatrically by Vertical Entertainment
March 18, 2022	Umma	
July 29, 2022	A Love Song	co-distribution with Bleecker Street
November 23, 2022	Devotion	North American theatrical co-distribution with Columbia Pictures only; produced by Black Label Media and STX Entertainment
January 13, 2023	The Drop	distributed by Hulu; co-production with Duplass Brothers Productions, Tango Entertainment, Everything is Everything and Perception Media
January 13, 2023	A Man Called Otto	co-production with Columbia Pictures, Playtone, SF Studios, STX Entertainment, Artistic Films and 2DUX²
January 20, 2023	Missing	co-distributed by Screen Gems
April 28, 2023	Sisu	distribution outside Finland only; co-production with Subzero Film Entertainment and Good Chaos; co-distributed in the US with Lionsgate Films
May 12, 2023	Knights of the Zodiac	distribution outside Japan and China only; co-production with Toei Animation
July 7, 2023	Insidious: The Red Door	co-production with Screen Gems and Blumhouse Productions
September 15, 2023	Dumb Money	co-distribution in the U.S., Latin America, Scandinavia, Eastern Europe, South Africa, India, China, Hong Kong, Taiwan, Thailand, Singapore, the Philippines, Malaysia, Vietnam and Indonesia with Columbia Pictures only; co-production with Black Bear Pictures and Ryder Picture Company
October 10, 2023	Down Low	distribution only; produced by FilmNation Entertainment and Sui Generis Pictures
October 20, 2023	The Persian Version	co-distribution with Sony Pictures Classics; produced by Marakesh Films, Archer Gray and AgX
December 5, 2023	There's Something in the Barn	distribution in North and Latin America, Italy, Greece, Cyprus, Bulgaria, South Africa, Israel, Turkey, China, Hong Kong, Taiwan and Japan only; produced by XYZ Films, Charades, Don Films and 74 Entertainment
February 9, 2024	Out of Darkness	co-distributed by Bleecker Street in North America and Signature Entertainment in the U.K. and Ireland
April 19, 2024	We Grown Now	co-distribution with Sony Pictures Classics; co-production with Participant and Symbolic Exchange
April 26, 2024	Downtown Owl	co-production with Kill Claudio Productions, Esme Grace Media and TPC
May 24, 2024	The Garfield Movie	First animated film; co-distribution outside China, Hong Kong and Taiwan with Columbia Pictures only; produced by Alcon Entertainment, DNEG Animation, Prime Focus, One Cool Group Limited, Wayfarer Studios, John Cohen Productions and Andrews McMeel Entertainment
October 4, 2024	The Outrun	co-distribution outside the U.K., Ireland, France, Germany, Austria, Switzerland and the Benelux with Sony Pictures Classics only; produced by BBC Film, StudioCanal, Screen Scotland, Weydemann Bros, MBK Productions, Brock Media and Arcade Pictures
November 1, 2024	Here	uncredited; U.S. co-distribution with TriStar Pictures only; produced by Miramax and ImageMovers
February 14, 2025	Paddington in Peru	co-distribution outside the U.K., Ireland, France, Germany, Austria, the Benelux, Poland, Australia, New Zealand, the CIS, China and Japan with Columbia Pictures only; produced by StudioCanal, Kinoshita Group and Marmalade Pictures
September 19, 2025	A Big Bold Beautiful Journey	uncredited; co-production with Columbia Pictures, 30West and Imperative Entertainment
October 24, 2025	Chainsaw Man - The Movie: Reze Arc	uncredited; co-distribution with Crunchyroll outside Japan only; produced by MAPPA
November 21, 2025	Sisu: Road to Revenge	co-distribution with Screen Gems outside Finland only; produced by Subzero Film Entertainment and Good Chaos
July 10, 2026	Evil Dead Burn	uncredited; international co-distribution with Screen Gems outside the U.K., Ireland, France and Russia only; co-production with New Line Cinema and Ghost House Pictures
August 21, 2026	Insidious: Out of the Further	co-distribution with Screen Gems; produced by Blumhouse Productions and Atomic Monster

=== Undated films ===
Release date	Title	Notes
2027	My Ex-Friend's Wedding	co-distribution with Columbia Pictures; co-production with Sister, Circle of Confusion and K&L Productions

== International distribution ==
Stage 6 occasionally also acquires international rights to films, be it worldwide excluding the United States and/or Canada, or in major territories such as the United Kingdom and Australia. Given below is a list of films (also seen on Stage 6 Films' official website) distributed internationally by Stage 6. Films which involve Stage 6 in their domestic releases as well are excluded from the list. An asterisk (*) denotes a film co-distributed with sister studio Sony Pictures Releasing International.

- 2 Guns* (2013) (with TriStar Pictures, International excl. U.K., Latin America, Middle East, Turkey, Thailand; U.S. distribution by Universal Pictures)
- 20th Century Women* (2016) (Latin America, Eastern Europe, Baltics, CIS, Spain, Italy, Asia excl. Japan, Korea; U.S. distribution by A24)
- The Accidental Getaway Driver (2023) (Worldwide excl. U.S.; U.S. distribution by Utopia)
- Afflicted (2013) (Latin America, Australia, New Zealand, South Africa, Italy, German-speaking Europe, Scandinavia, Eastern Europe; U.S. distribution by CBS Films; U.K., Canadian and Spanish distribution by Entertainment One)
- American Underdog (2021) (International; U.S. distribution by Lionsgate)
- American Woman* (2018) (International excl. U.K., Italy; U.S. distribution by Roadside Attractions and Vertical Entertainment; U.K. distribution by Signature Entertainment)
- Ammonite* (2020) (International excl. U.K., Australia, France, German-speaking Europe, Japan, airlines; North American distribution by Neon; U.K. distribution by Lionsgate; Australian distribution by Transmission Films)
- Arrival* (2016) (International excl. U.K., Australia, Middle East, Turkey, Israel, Greece, India, China; North American and Chinese distribution by Paramount Pictures)
- Are You There God? It's Me, Margaret. (2023) (International excl. U.K.; worldwide distribution by Lionsgate)
- A.X.L.* (2018) (Canada, Latin America, Scandinavia, Eastern Europe, Greece, Spain, Middle East, Turkey, India; worldwide distribution by Global Road Entertainment)
- Band Aid (2017) (International; North American distribution by IFC Films)
- Beau Is Afraid* (2023) (U.K., Middle East, pan-Asian pay TV, worldwide airlines and ships; worldwide distribution by A24)
- The Best Christmas Pageant Ever (2024) (International; worldwide distribution by Lionsgate)
- The Best of Enemies* (2019) (International; U.S. distribution by STX Entertainment)
- Black Sea* (2014) (Latin America, German-speaking Europe, Eastern Europe, Scandinavia; U.S. distribution by Focus Features; U.K. distribution by Universal Pictures)
- Bleed for This* (2016) (All media excl. airlines in Canada, Latin America, Australia, South Africa, Germany, France, Spain, Benelux, Scandinavia, Eastern Europe, Greece; U.S. distribution by Open Road Films)
- Bodies Bodies Bodies (2022) (Worldwide excl. U.S., China; worldwide distribution by A24)
- Boxing Day (2021) (Worldwide excl. U.S., U.K.; U.K. distribution by Warner Bros. Pictures)
- Brian Banks* (2018) (Worldwide excl. U.S.; U.S. distribution by Bleecker Street and ShivHans Pictures)
- Bring Her Back (2025) (International excl. China, Russia, Japan; U.S. distribution by A24)
- Buddy (2026) (International; North American distribution by Roadside Attractions and Saban Films)
- Bull (2019) (International; North American distribution by Samuel Goldwyn Films)
- Certain Women (2016) (Worldwide excl. U.S.; U.S. distribution by IFC Films)
- Chef* (2014) (France, Italy, Spain, Scandinavia, Benelux, China, Japan, Thailand; U.S. distribution by Open Road Films)
- Christy (2025) (Latin America, Italy, Spain, Scandinavia, South Africa, Middle East, Turkey, China, Korea, Thailand, Indonesia, Malaysia, Vietnam; North American and U.K. distribution by Black Bear Pictures)
- The Damned (2024) (International excl. U.K., Australia, South Africa, Nordics, Portugal, Poland; North American and U.K. distribution by Vertical)
- Demolition* (2015) (Latin America, Eastern Europe, Nordics, Greece; U.S., U.K., Australian, French and German distribution by Fox Searchlight Pictures)
- Digging for Fire* (2015) (International; North American distribution by The Orchard)
- Disobedience* (2018) (International excl. U.K., Australia, France, Italy, Switzerland, Middle East, Israel; U.S. distribution by A24; U.K. distribution by Curzon)
- Dope* (2015) (International; U.S. distribution by Open Road Films)
- Dream Horse* (2021) (International excl. U.K., France, German-speaking Europe, Italy, Japan, airlines; U.S. distribution by Bleecker Street, U.K. distribution by Warner Bros. Pictures)
- The Edge of Seventeen* (2016) (International excl. U.K., Australia, South Africa, Middle East, China; U.S. distribution by STX Entertainment)
- Eighth Grade* (2018) (International excl. Japan; worldwide distribution by A24)
- Eternal Beauty* (2019) (International excl. U.K., France, German-speaking Europe, Middle East, China, Japan, Korea; North American distribution by Samuel Goldwyn Films; U.K. distribution by Bulldog Film Distribution)
- Firebrand (2023) (Germany, Greece, Nordics, Australia, South Africa, Middle East, Turkey, Asia excl. Japan; U.S. distribution by Roadside Attractions and Vertical; U.K. distribution by MetFilm Distribution and Amazon Prime Video)
- The Forest* (2016) (Australia, South Africa, Eastern Europe, Israel, Nordics, Spain, Portugal, Asia excl. Japan; North American distribution by Focus Features through Gramercy Pictures)
- Free Fire* (2016) (Latin America, Scandinavia, Eastern Europe, Spain, Greece, Australia, South Africa, Israel, Turkey, India, Southeast Asia; North American distribution by A24; U.K. distribution by StudioCanal)
- Gloria Bell* (2019) (Latin America, Portugal, Spain, Scandinavia, Eastern Europe, Baltics, CIS, Greece, South Africa, Middle East, Turkey, Asia excl. Japan; U.S. distribution by A24)
- The Glorias* (2020) (Latin America, Eastern Europe, CIS, Baltics, Scandinavia, Portugal, Greece, Middle East, Turkey, Australia, Asia excl. China, Japan; U.S. distribution by Roadside Attractions and LD Entertainment)
- A Great Awakening (2026) (Worldwide excl. U.S.; U.S. distribution by Roadside Attractions)
- Hearts Beat Loud (2018) (International; U.S. distribution by Gunpowder & Sky)
- Hell of a Summer (2025) (Worldwide excl. U.S.; U.S. distribution by Neon)
- Her* (2013) (Latin America, Australia, South Africa, Eastern Europe, Scandinavia, pan-Asian pay TV; U.S., German and Austrian distribution by Warner Bros. Pictures)
- Honey Boy* (2019) (Worldwide excl. U.S., Japan; U.S. and Japanese distribution by Amazon Studios)
- Hope (2026) (Portugal, Nordics, Middle East, Israel; North American, U.K., Irish, Australian and New Zealand distribution by Neon; South Korean distribution by Plus M Entertainment)
- Hunt for the Wilderpeople* (2016) (International excl. U.K., Australia, France, Middle East; U.S. distribution by the Orchard; Australian and New Zealand distribution by Madman Entertainment)
- I Can Only Imagine 2 (International; worldwide distribution by Lionsgate)
- If Beale Street Could Talk* (2018) (Latin America, Eastern Europe, Baltics, CIS, Scandinavia, Greece, Portugal, South Africa, Middle East, Israel, Turkey, Asia excl. China, Japan; U.S. distribution by Annapurna Pictures)
- Infinite Storm (2022) (Worldwide excl. U.S.; U.S. distribution by Bleecker Street)
- In Secret* (2013) (U.K., Latin America, Germany, Scandinavia, Benelux; U.S. distribution by Roadside Attractions)
- I Saw the TV Glow (2024) (International excl. Japan; worldwide distribution by A24)
- Janet Planet (2024) (International excl. U.K. theatrical and Japan; worldwide distribution by A24)
- Jesus Revolution (2023) (International; U.S. distribution by Lionsgate)
- Joe Bell (2020) (International excl. U.K., Australia, German-speaking Europe; U.S. distribution by Roadside Attractions)
- Joyride (2022) (International excl. U.K.; U.S. distribution by Magnolia Pictures; U.K. distribution by Vertigo Releasing)
- Jules (2023) (Eastern Europe, Scandinavia, France, Italy, Spain, Benelux, Greece, South Africa, Asia excl. Japan, Singapore; North American distribution by Bleecker Street)
- Juliet, Naked (2018) (Hungary, Romania, Czech Republic, Slovakia, Bulgaria, Baltics, CIS, Benelux, Asia excl. Japan, Korea; U.S. distribution by Roadside Attractions and Lionsgate; U.K. distribution by Universal Pictures and Focus Features)
- The Last Showgirl (2024) (International excl. U.K., Australia, German-speaking Europe, Italy, Spain, Benelux, Poland, Baltics, CIS, Middle East, airlines; North American distribution by Roadside Attractions)
- The Last Vermeer* (2019) (International; U.S. distribution by TriStar Pictures; originally to be distributed by Sony Pictures Classics)
- Late Night* (2019) (International excl. U.K., Australia, France, German-speaking Europe, Israel, airlines; U.S. distribution by Amazon Studios)
- Leave No Trace* (2018) (International excl. France; U.S. distribution by Bleecker Street)
- Life Itself* (2018) (Eastern Europe, Baltics, CIS, Greece, Portugal, Middle East, India, Indonesia, Malaysia, Thailand, Philippines, Vietnam; U.S. distribution by Amazon Studios)
- Little Fish (2020) (International; U.S. distribution by IFC Films)
- The Lodge* (2019) (International excl. France, German-speaking Europe, Benelux, Italy, Australia, Israel; U.S. distribution by Neon)
- Love & Mercy* (2014) (U.K., Latin America, Eastern Europe, Scandinavia, Spain, Italy; U.S. distribution by Roadside Attractions and Lionsgate)
- The Lovers* (2017) (International; U.S. distribution by A24)
- Manchester by the Sea* (2016) (Latin America, Eastern Europe, Baltics, Nordics, pan-Asian pay TV; U.S. distribution by Amazon Studios and Roadside Attractions)
- Marshall* (2017) (Worldwide excl. U.S.; U.S. distribution by Open Road Films)
- Materialists* (International excl. China, Japan, Russia; U.S. distribution by A24)
- Montana Story (2021) (International; U.S. distribution by Bleecker Street)
- Moving On (2022) (International; U.S. distribution by Roadside Attractions)
- Mr. Holmes* (2015) (Latin America, Eastern Europe, Nordics; U.S. distribution by Roadside Attractions and Miramax; U.K. distribution by Entertainment One)
- Ordinary Angels (2024) (International; North American distribution by Lionsgate)
- Primetime (2026) (Middle East, Israel, South Africa, Switzerland, Korea, Singapore, Thailand, Indonesia, Vietnam; worldwide distribution by A24)
- Relay (2025) (Latin America, France, Italy, China, Japan, Korea, Malaysia, Philippines, Vietnam; U.S. distribution by Bleecker Street)
- Roofman (2025) (Italy, China, Hong Kong, Japan, Korea, Thailand, Malaysia, Vietnam; U.S. and U.K. distribution by Paramount Pictures)
- Saint Maud* (2020) (International excl. U.K., France; North American distribution by A24 in association with Epix; U.K. distribution by StudioCanal)
- Sharp Stick* (2022) (International; U.S. distribution by Utopia)
- The Skeleton Twins* (2014) (Worldwide excl. U.S.; North American distribution by Lionsgate and Roadside Attractions)
- Sleight* (2016) (Worldwide excl. U.S.; worldwide distribution by WWE Studios and BH Tilt)
- Somewhere in Queens (2023) (International; U.S. distribution by Lionsgate and Roadside Attractions)
- Sound of Metal* (2019) (International excl. France, Germany, streaming; U.S. distribution by Amazon Studios)
- The Sound of Silence* (2019) (International; North American distribution by IFC Films)
- Sleepless* (2017) (Canada, Latin America, Eastern Europe, Nordics, Spain, Greece, Middle East, Turkey, India; U.S. distribution by Open Road Films)
- Spin Me Round (2022) (International; North American distribution by IFC Films and AMC+)
- Spinal Tap II: The End Continues (2025) (Worldwide excl. U.S.; U.S. distribution by Bleecker Street)
- A Street Cat Named Bob (2016) (U.K., Latin America, Australia, Nordics, Eastern Europe, CIS, Baltics, Spain, Portugal, Greece, Turkey, Israel; distributed in the U.S. by Cleopatra Entertainment)
- Studio 666 (2022) (International; worldwide distribution by Open Road Films)
- Summer Camp (2024) (Worldwide excl. U.S.; U.S. distribution by Roadside Attractions)
- Summering (2022) (International; North American distribution by Bleecker Street)
- Them That Follow* (2019) (International; U.S. distribution by 1091 Pictures)
- This Is Spinal Tap (1984; 2025 re-release) (Worldwide excl. U.S.; U.S. distribution by Bleecker Street)
- Together Together (2021) (International; North American distribution by Bleecker Street)
- The Tomorrow Man* (2019) (International; U.S. distribution by Bleecker Street)
- Triple 9* (2016) (Latin America, Eastern Europe, Scandinavia; U.S. distribution by Open Road Films)
- Tuesday (2024) (International excl. U.K. theatrical and Japan; worldwide distribution by A24)
- Twinless (2025) (International; U.S. distribution by Lionsgate and Roadside Attractions)
- Undertone (2026) (International excl. U.K., Australia, Russia, Japan; worldwide distribution by A24)
- Unsung Hero (2024) (International; U.S. distribution by Lionsgate)
- The Uprising (2026) (Select territories incl. Latin America and France; North American distribution by Focus Features; U.K. distribution by Entertainment Film Distributors)
- Whiplash (2014) (Latin America, the U.K., Australia, Germany, Scandinavia, Benelux, Greece, Spain, Italy, Portugal, South Africa, Eastern Europe; North American distribution by Sony Pictures Classics)
- Wicked Little Letters (2023) (Latin America, Eastern Europe, Baltics, CIS, Scandinavia, Greece, Middle East, Turkey, Israel, Asia excl. China; North American and Chinese distribution by Sony Pictures Classics; U.K., French, German, Australian and Benelux distribution by StudioCanal)
- Wildlife* (2018) (Latin America, Eastern Europe, Scandinavia, German-speaking Europe, Spain, Italy, Greece, Portugal, South Africa, Asia excl. Japan, Korea; U.S. distribution by IFC Films)
- Words on Bathroom Walls* (2020) (International excl. Latin America, Italy, Benelux, CIS; U.S. distribution by Roadside Attractions)
- The World to Come* (2020) (International; U.S. distribution by Bleecker Street)
- You Can See Everything (2026) (Latin America, Scandinavia, Germany, Greece, South Africa, Middle East, Israel, India, Korea, Southeast Asia; worldwide distribution by A24)
- You Hurt My Feelings (2023) (Latin America, German-speaking Europe, Spain, Eastern Europe, CIS, Benelux, Greece, Middle East, Turkey, Nordics, Asia, South Africa; U.S. distribution by A24)
- The Zero Theorem (2013) (U.K., Australia, Spain, Scandinavia; U.S. distribution by Amplify and Well Go USA Entertainment)
- Zola* (2020) (International excl. China, Japan; U.S. distribution by A24)

== See also ==
- Columbia Pictures
- Screen Gems
- TriStar Pictures
- Triumph Films
- Affirm Films
- Destination Films
- Sony Pictures Classics
