= Linden Ashby =

American actor (born 1960)

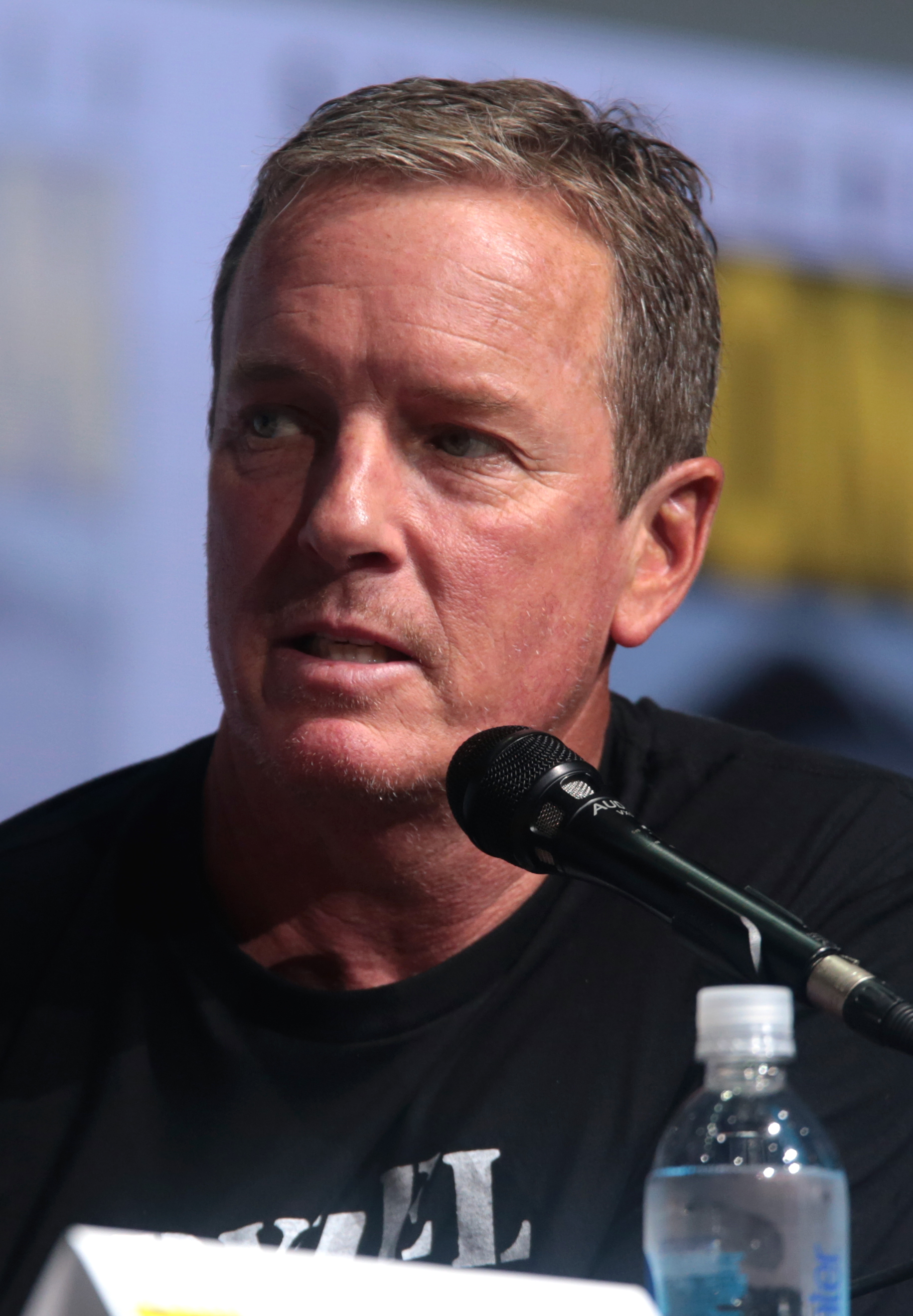
- Ashby at the 2017 San Diego Comic-Con
- Born: Clarence Linden Garnett Ashby III; May 23, 1960 (age 66); Atlantic Beach, Florida, U.S.
- Occupation: Actor
- Years active: 1983–present
- Spouse: Susan Walters (m. 1986)
- Children: 2

Clarence Linden Garnett Ashby III (born May 23, 1960) is an American actor. On television, he portrayed Brett Cooper on the final two seasons of the Fox soap opera Melrose Place (1997–1999) and Sheriff Noah Stilinski on all six seasons of the MTV supernatural drama Teen Wolf (2011–2017). He is also known for portraying Johnny Cage in the 1995 film Mortal Kombat, an adaptation of the video game franchise of the same name.

== Early life ==
Ashby was born in Atlantic Beach, Florida, the son of Eleanor (Johnson), a civic organizer, and Clarence Linden Garnett Ashby Jr., a pharmaceuticals manufacturer. Ashby graduated from The Bolles School, a private school located in Jacksonville, Florida. He attended Fort Lewis College in Durango, Colorado, but dropped out his junior year to pursue an acting career. Ashby studied acting at Neighborhood Playhouse in New York City.

== Career ==
Ashby's first role on television, in 1985, was on the ABC soap opera Loving, where he was the second actor to play the role of Curtis Alden. Soon after, he was cast as Lance Reventlow, the only son of Woolworth heiress Barbara Hutton (played by Farrah Fawcett) in the Golden Globe-winning miniseries Poor Little Rich Girl: The Barbara Hutton Story.

Drawing on his martial arts background, Ashby portrayed Johnny Cage in Mortal Kombat, the 1995 film adaptation of the video game of the same name; the film became a cult classic. He would later return to voice Johnny Cage in the Mortal Kombat 11 video game.

In the second quarter of 1997, Ashby starred in the short-lived ABC drama Spy Game. Later that year, he joined the main cast of Melrose Place as Brett Cooper, a role he had until the start of the seventh season in late 1998. He first appeared on the show in the first season in 1993 as Jo Reynolds's estranged husband Charles, in the episodes "Single White Sister" and "Peanut Butter and Jealousy". He was in the movie Wyatt Earp where he played Morgan Earp, Wyatt Earp's (Kevin Costner) younger brother. He played Cameron Kirsten on the CBS soap opera The Young and the Restless from 2003 to 2004.

In 2007, Ashby appeared as Chase, a cowboy and ex-cop survivor in Resident Evil: Extinction, the third installment of the Resident Evil film series. In the following year, he was cast in the 2008 remake of Prom Night. He also began playing the role of Paul Hollingsworth on Days of Our Lives in March 2008.

In 2011, Ashby started portraying Noah Stilinski, Beacon Hills' sheriff and father to Stiles, on MTV's Teen Wolf series. He was in the show for six seasons until it ended in 2017. For his portrayal of Sheriff Stilinski in the sixth season, he received a nomination for Best Supporting Actor on a Television Series at the 43rd Saturn Awards. He also had a brief role in the Marvel Studios' Iron Man 3 in 2013.

In September 2021, it was announced that a reunion film for Teen Wolf had been ordered by Paramount+, with Jeff Davis returning as a screenwriter and executive producer of the film. The majority of the original cast members, including Ashby, were set to reprise their roles. The film was released on January 26, 2023. Ashby also appeared in the 2022 Netflix movie Purple Hearts as Jacob Morrow Sr.

In May 2023, Ashby reprised his role as Cameron on The Young and the Restless. After a month, Ashby departed from the series when Cameron was killed off in an episode that aired on June 16. The next year, Ashby was nominated for the Daytime Emmy Award for Outstanding Guest Performer in a Drama Series for his role as Cameron. On July 30, 2024, it was announced that Ashby would reprise his role again.

== Personal life ==
Ashby is married to actress Susan Walters. The couple met on the set of Loving in 1983, where she was a regular and he was filming a guest appearance. (He would later become a regular cast member in 1985.) They have two daughters, born in 1991 and 1992.

Linden began boxing at an early age and was an amateur boxer before studying Karate in his twenties. In karate, he holds a blue belt.

Linden has admitted to previously suffering panic attacks before auditions which threatened to shorten his career.

== Filmography ==
=== Film ===
| Year | Title | Role | Notes |
|---|---|---|---|
| 1990 | Night Angel | Craig | |
| 1992 | Into the Sun | "Dragon" | |
| 1992 | Inside Out III | Jerry Van Anthony | Segment: "Tang Martin Hudson" |
| 1994 | Wyatt Earp | Morgan Earp | |
| 1994 | 8 Seconds | Martin Hudson | |
| 1995 | Mortal Kombat | Johnny Cage | |
| 1996 | Cadillac Ranch | Beau | |
| 1997 | Blast | Jack Bryant | |
| 1998 | Shelter | Jimmy Parker | |
| 1999 | Time of Her Time | Sergius O'Shaughnessy | |
| 1999 | Judgment Day | David Corbett | Direct-to-video |
| 2000 | Dangerous Attraction | Neil / Dan Paterson | |
| 2000 | Tick Tock | Travis Brewer | |
| 2001 | Facing the Enemy | Griffin "Griff" McCleary | |
| 2002 | Fits and Starts | | |
| 2002 | Whacked! | Bolen | |
| 2003 | The Company You Keep | Harry | |
| 2003 | A Woman Hunted | Webster | |
| 2003 | Shrink Rap | Brian | |
| 2005 | Sub Zero | Soloman Davis | |
| 2007 | Plot 7 | Richard McCarthy | |
| 2007 | Resident Evil: Extinction | Chase | |
| 2008 | Prom Night | Jack Turner | |
| 2008 | Impact Point | Adams | |
| 2009 | Against the Dark | Cross | Direct-to-video |
| 2009 | National Lampoon's Van Wilder: Freshman Year | Vance Wilder Sr. | Direct-to-video |
| 2009 | Hunger | Grant | Direct-to-video |
| 2009 | The Joneses | Golfer 3 | |
| 2013 | Iron Man 3 | Commander | |
| 2016 | Beta Test | Andrew Kincaid | |
| 2022 | Purple Hearts | Jacob Morrow Sr. | |
| 2023 | Teen Wolf: The Movie | Noah Stilinski | |

=== Television ===
| Year | Title | Role | Notes |
|---|---|---|---|
| 1983 | Loving | Curtis Alden #4 | |
| 1987 | 1st & Ten | Mike Cooper | Episode: "Blood on Blood" |
| 1987 | Werewolf | Victim #2 in VW | Episode: "Werewolf" |
| 1987 | Poor Little Rich Girl: The Barbara Hutton Story | Lance Reventlow (adult) | Television film |
| 1989 | China Beach | Phillip | Episode: "The World: Part 2" |
| 1989–1991 | Adam-12 | Honeycutt | Main role |
| 1990 | Hardball | | Episode: "A Killer Date" |
| 1990 | MacGyver | Brett Reynolds | Episode: "Twenty Questions" |
| 1991 | Equal Justice | Charles | Episode: "Sleeping with the Enemy" |
| 1991 | The Perfect Bride | Ted | Television film |
| 1992 | Fifteenth Phase of the Moon | Jason | Television film |
| 1993 | New Year | Jimi Hartman | Television film |
| 1993 | Melrose Place | Charles Reynolds | Episodes: "Single White Sister", "Peanut Butter and Jealousy" |
| 1994 | Green Dolphin Beat | Dave Henderson | Television film |
| 1997–1998 | Melrose Place | Brett "Coop" Cooper | Main role (season 6) |
| 1996 | Dark Angel | Harry Foley | Television film |
| 1997 | The Beneficiary | Jimmy Price | Television film |
| 1997 | Spy Game | Lorne Cash | Main role |
| 1998 | The Lake | Jeff Chapman | Television film |
| 1998 | Beauty | Mark Kramer | Television film |
| 1998 | Love Boat: The Next Wave | Joe Spenser | Episode: "Bermuda Triangle Episode" |
| 1998 | Murder She Purred: A Mrs. Murphy Mystery | Blair Bainbridge | Television film |
| 1999 | Where the Truth Lies | Carter Tamiran | Television film |
| 2000 | The War Next Door | Kennedy Smith | Main role |
| 2001 | The Agency | | Episode: "A Slight Case of Anthrax" |
| 2002 | CSI: Crime Scene Investigation | Drew Wolf | Episode: "A Little Murder" |
| 2002 | Sniper 2 | Dan McKenna | Television film |
| 2003–2004, 2023–2025 | The Young and the Restless | Cameron Kirsten | 55 episodes |
| 2004 | Wild Things 2 | Michael Morrison | Television film |
| 2005 | Wild Things: Diamonds in the Rough | Michael Morrison | Television film |
| 2005 | A Killer Upstairs | Lyle Banner | Television film |
| 2005 | CSI: Miami | Steven Hardy | Episode: "Three-Way" |
| 2005, 2007 | Eyes | Michael Tobin | Episodes: "Shots", "Police" |
| 2006 | Maid of Honor | Richard Wynn | Television film |
| 2006 | Last Exit | Scott Burke | Television film |
| 2006 | The Rival | George Miller | Television film |
| 2007 | My Neighbor's Keeper | Mike Harding | Television film |
| 2008 | Dead at 17 | Curt Masterson | Television film |
| 2008 | Days of Our Lives | Paul Hollingsworth | Recurring role |
| 2009 | Anacondas: Trail of Blood | Jackson | Television film |
| 2009 | Army Wives | Koe | Episode: Shrapnel and Alibis |
| 2009 | Stripped Naked | Howie | Television film |
| 2009 | Drop Dead Diva | Parker Wellner | Episode: "Pilot" |
| 2010 | Accused at 17 | Reeder | Television film (Lifetime) |
| 2010 | The Gates | Ben McAllister | Recurring role |
| 2011 | Mean Girls 2 | Rod Mitchell | Television film |
| 2011–2017 | Teen Wolf | Noah Stilinski | Recurring role (seasons 1–5); main role (season 6); director (episode: "Face-to-Faceless") |
| 2011 | Franklin & Bash | Evan Porter | Episode: "Pilot" |
| 2011 | Field of Vision | Ron Dixon | Television film |
| 2012–2013 | Army Wives | Dan Seaver | Recurring role (seasons 6–7) |
| 2012 | Gabe the Cupid Dog | Jerry | Television film |
| 2013 | The Perfect Boss | Cameron Finney | Television film |
| 2017 | Lifeline | Grundy | Recurring role |
| 2018 | A Daughter's Revenge | David Spencer | Television film |
| 2019–2020 | Trinkets | Whit Foster | Recurring role |
| 2020 | Escaping My Stalker | Larry | Television film; also director |
| 2020 | NCIS: New Orleans | Tony Hicks | Episode: "Pride and Prejudice" |

=== Video games ===
| Year | Title | Role | Notes |
|---|---|---|---|
| 2020 | Mortal Kombat 11 | Johnny Cage ("Hollywood Kombatant") | Voice and physical likeness; appears as downloadable content |

== Awards and nominations ==
| Year (Note: Where available, the year is linked to the article for the specific instance of the awards ceremony.) | Award | Category | Work | Result |
|---|---|---|---|---|
| 2005 | Soap Opera Digest Awards | Favorite Villain | The Young and the Restless | Nominated |
| 2013 | World Music & Independent Film Festival Awards | Best Lead Actor in a Short Film | Grape | Nominated |
| 2017 | Saturn Awards | Best Supporting Actor on a Television Series | Teen Wolf | Nominated |
| 2024 | Daytime Emmy Award | Outstanding Guest Performer in a Drama Series | The Young and the Restless | Nominated |
| 2025 | Daytime Emmy Award | Outstanding Guest Performer in a Drama Series | The Young and the Restless | Nominated |
