= Sandra McCoy =

American actress and dancer

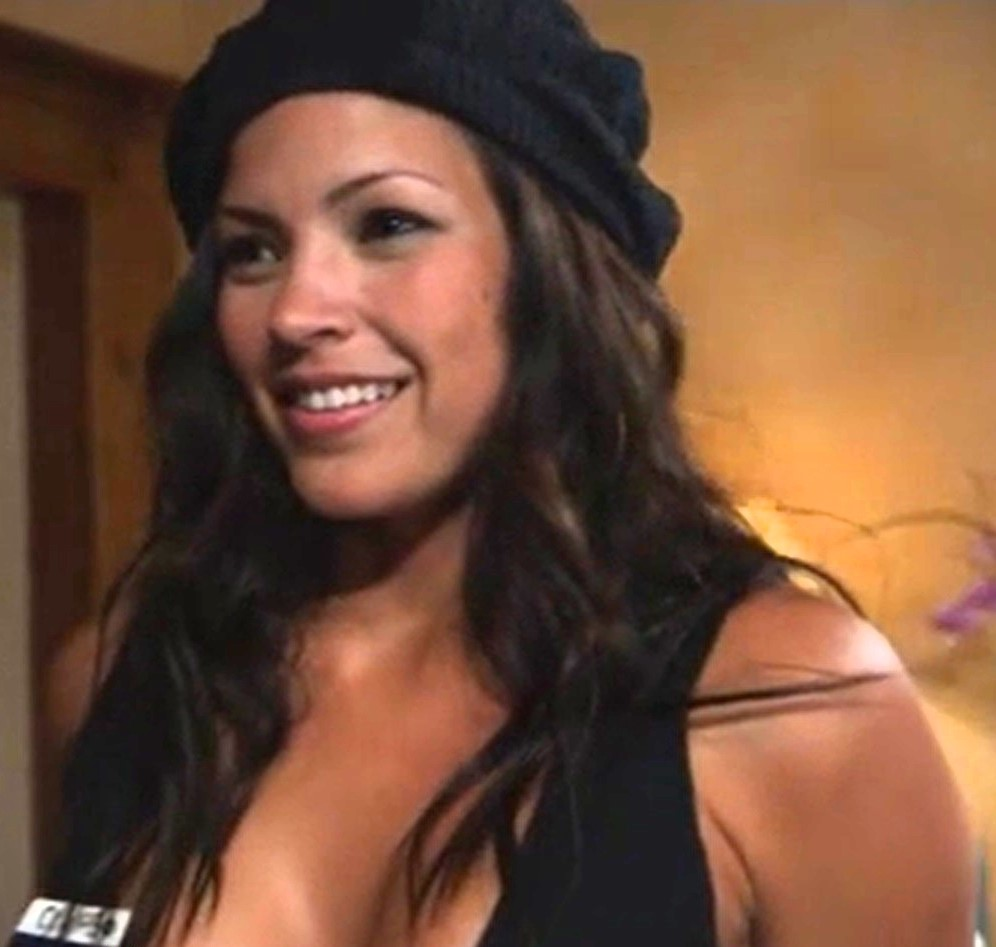
- McCoy in The Love Affair, 2010 short film
- Born: Sandra Christina McCoy; August 14, 1979 (age 47); San Jose, California, U.S.
- Education: Santa Clara University (BA)
- Occupations: Actress, dancer
- Years active: 2001–2014
- Website: www.sandramccoy.com

Sandra McCoy is an American former actress and dancer. McCoy is primarily known for being featured in the music video of NSYNC's single, "Pop" (2001) and as Mercedes in Cry Wolf (2005).

== Early life and education ==
McCoy was born and raised in San Jose, California in a Filipino/Irish family. Her mother, Madeline, was a high school Physical Education teacher, tennis coach, and aerobics instructor. Her father, Gary, was the director of database management at the County Sheriff's Department and a private pilot. Her parents and her brother, Scott, died in late 1993 in an airplane crash in the Fresno area when their plane exploded midair. Sandra did not go on the trip as she had a swimming competition. Instead, her brother took a friend, Mark Guitterez (both students of Quimby Oak Jr. High School at the time of death), who also perished in the crash.

McCoy has trained in dance and gymnastics since she was eight years old and was on the cheerleading squad and soccer and diving teams at Independence High School.

== Career ==
McCoy moved to Los Angeles, where she still resides today, to pursue a career in show business after attaining a Bachelor's Degree in Psychology from Santa Clara University. Though her first attempt at Hollywood success, a four-girl pop group, fell through, McCoy proceeded to enjoy several other successes in the film industry as both an actress and dancer. Her first real break into the business was booking the lead role in NSYNC's "Pop" music video. In addition, she was a cheerleader for the Los Angeles Lakers in the season of 2002–2003 and made her calendar debut in Music Video Beauties of 2004. She retired from acting in 2014.

McCoy made many appearances in small roles on several noted television shows before landing her first lead role. She is best known for her starring role as Mercedes in 2005's Cry Wolf, where she met her long-term boyfriend Jared Padalecki; however, the two ended their relationship in 2008.

In early March 2007, McCoy auditioned for the reality television series Pussycat Dolls Present: The Search for the Next Doll to become the seventh Pussycat Doll, but did not make it into the house. McCoy also guest-starred in the Supernatural episode "Bedtime Stories".

== Filmography ==
=== Film ===
Year	Title	Role	Notes
2002	Orange County	Dancer	
2002	Scooby-Doo	Waitress	Uncredited
2002	Like Mike	Cheerleader #8	
2002	The Hot Chick	Jessica Cheer Girl	
2003	Down with Love	Astronette #5	
2004	A Cinderella Story	Cheerleader / Dancer #1	
2005	Crash Landing	Melanie	
2005	Cry Wolf	Mercedes	
2005	Horror High	Leslie	
2006	Lost Signal	Tiffany Matthews	
2007	House of Fears	Hailey	
2008	Toxic	Jaymee	
2009	Nite Tales: The Movie	Serena	
2009	Deep in the Valley	Cute Nurse	
2009	Porky's Pimpin' Pee Wee	Vanessa	

=== Television ===
Year	Title	Role	Notes
2001	Maybe It's Me	Cheerleader	Episode: "The Cheerleader Episode"
2001	Felicity	Pageant Contestant	Uncredited, episode: "Miss Conception"
2001	General Hospital	Mandy	Episode dated: December 21, 2001
2002	Power Rangers Wild Force	Kendall	2 episodes
2002	Hidden Hills	Miss Lily	6 episodes
2002	Sabrina the Teenage Witch	Attractive Woman	Episode: "It's a Hot, Hot, Hot, Hot Christmas"
2003	CSI: Crime Scene Investigation	Hot Chick	Episode: "Lady Heather's Box"
2003	The Parkers	Girl #2	Episode: "A Plot of View"
2003	Days of Our Lives	Joelle	Episode dated: September 25, 2003
2003	CSI: Miami	Allyson	Episode: "Dead Zone"
2005	Wild Things: Diamonds in the Rough	Elena Sandoval	Television film
2005	Days of Our Lives	Amber	Episode dated: October 24, 2005
2006	CSI: NY	Amber Capece	Episode: "Risk"
2006	Two and a Half Men	Tina	Episode: "Working for Caligula"
2006	Veronica Mars	Scarlett	Uncredited, episode: "Of Vice and Men"
2007	The O.C.	Hippie Chick	Episode: "The Groundhog Day"
2007	Pussycat Dolls Present: The Search for the Next Doll	Herself	Episode: "The Auditions"
2007	Supernatural	Crossroads Demon	Episode: "Bedtime Stories"
2009	Secret Girlfriend	Actress / Girl In Car	Episode: "You Help Sam Have His First Wet Dream" (as Girl In Car), Episode: "You Get a New Girlfriend" (as Actress)
2011	Rizzoli & Isles	Spa Worker	Episode: "Living Proof"
2012	Femme Fatales	Professor Kelsey Williams	Episode: "Extracurricular Activities"
2012	Vegas	Monique Morel	Episode: "Masquerade"
2014	Benched	Lucy	Episode: "Shark, Actually"

=== Music videos ===
Year	Title	Artist
2001	"Pop"	NSYNC
2001	"The Way You Like It"	Adema
2003	"Señorita"	Justin Timberlake
2003	"How Can I Live"	Ill Niño
2007	"You Never Take Me Dancing"	Travis Tritt
