= Leila Arcieri =

American actress

- Born: December 18, 1973 (age 52); San Francisco, California
- Years active: 1999–present

Leila Carmelita Arcieri (born December 18, 1973) is an American actress, model and businesswoman. She was Miss San Francisco in the 1997 Miss California pageant and has appeared in several films such as XXX, Wild Things 2 and Daddy Day Care. Arcieri is the founder and president of the natural sweetener brand STIR Sweetener. She played Jamaica St. Croix on Son of the Beach (2000–2002).

== Early life ==
Arcieri was born in San Francisco, California, She is the daughter of Anita Van Buyten. She is of mixed Italian, Jewish, African-American, and Native American ancestry.

== Career ==
Arcieri was crowned Miss San Francisco in 1997, and soon after she began appearing in both commercials (including 1-800-COLLECT and Starburst) and music videos with the likes of Boyz II Men, The Isley Brothers, Montell Jordan, and Q-Tip. Such work eventually brought her to the attention of writer-producer Timothy Stack, who cast her in the role of Jamaica St. Croix in his new television series, Son of the Beach, a parody of Baywatch. That same year, Arcieri was selected as the Coors Lite Beer 2000 spokesmodel.

In 2005, she was voted No. 65 on Maxim magazine's Hot 100 list.

== Filmography ==
=== Film ===
Year	Title	Role	Notes
1999	Foolish	Marissa	
1999	Beverly Hood	Pam Washington	
2000	Hot Boyz	Tia	Video
2001	Higher Ed	Lisa	
2002	XXX	Jordan King	
2003	Daddy Day Care	Kelli	
2003	Double Blade	Lee	Short
2004	Wild Things 2	Maya King	TV movie
2005	A Perfect Fit	Sarah	
2005	The Final Chapter: The Death of Xander Cage	Jordan King	Short
2005	King's Ransom	Kim Baker	
2005	The Show with A.J. Calloway	Allison	TV movie
2006	Mammoth	Agent Powers	TV movie
2007	Babylon Fields	Louisa Ramirez	TV movie
2008	Death Toll	Detective Bathgate	
2009	Love N' Dancing	Danielle	
2009	Divas	Karen	
2009	Buffalo Bushido	Sadie Lynn Miller	
2010	Supreme Champion	Kaya	
2010	The Fuzz	Detective 'Terri' DeStefano	TV movie

=== Television ===
Year	Title	Role	Notes
1999	Rescue 77	-	Episode: "Pilot"
2000	Cousin Skeeter	Tasty	Episode: "The Feminine Ms. Skeet"
2000–02	Son of the Beach	Jamaica St. Croix	Main cast
2004	Jeremiah	Crystal	Episode: "The Face in the Mirror"
2004–05	Kevin Hill	Monroe McManus	Recurring cast
2005	CSI: NY	Darcy Sullivan	Episode: "City of the Dolls"
2006	One on One	Lila	Episode: "Fame and the Older Woman"
2006	Las Vegas	Ava	Episode: "Like a Virgin"
2006	CSI: Miami	Nikki Beck	Episode: "Shock"
2009	Brothers	Gloria	Episode: "Girls, Girls, Girls"

=== Music videos ===
Year	Title	Artist(s)
1999	"Vivrant Thing"	Q-Tip
1999	"Breathe and Stop"	Q-Tip
1999	"Get It On Tonite"	Montell Jordan
1999	"Satisfy You"	Puff Daddy
2004	"She Wants to Move"	N.E.R.D.
