= Destination Films =

Division of Sony Pictures Entertainment

Destination Films Distribution Company, Inc.
- Type: Division
- Industry: Film
- Genre: Action; Thriller; Niche sci-fi Low-end to medium-end Horror
- Founded: 1998; 28 years ago (original); 2002; 24 years ago (relaunch)
- Founders: Steve Stabler; Brent Baum
- Defunct: 2001; 25 years ago (original)
- Fate: Shut down (original)
- Headquarters: 10202 West Washington Boulevard, Culver City, California, USA
- Products: Motion pictures Anime
- Parent: Sony Pictures Home Entertainment (2002–2007); Sony Pictures Worldwide Acquisitions (2007–present)

Destination Films Distribution Company, Inc. is a film production company owned by Sony Pictures currently specializing in action, thriller, niche sci-fi and low-end to medium-end horror films.

== History ==
The original Destination Films was founded by former DreamWorks Pictures executive Brent Baum and Steve Stabler in 1998. The company made a deal with Columbia TriStar Home Video to have them distribute their films for video release. In 1999, Steve Stabler had left the studio due to creative differences. The company was shut down in February 2001 after failing to meet financial expectations. The company's library and in-production projects such as The Wedding Planner and Slackers were sold off to Sony Pictures for distribution.

In 2002, Destination Films was revived as a division of Columbia TriStar Home Entertainment, with the anime film Metropolis being scheduled for their first release, although the film Shiri would be released a couple weeks before. Sony bought out the IP, name and logo from a trust that held the rights to the first Destination Films company. Many of the films released on home entertainment under Destination Films would receive a small theatrical release beforehand from either other Sony Pictures divisions like TriStar Pictures and Screen Gems or third-party distributors like Samuel Goldwyn Films.

In 2007, Sony Pictures Worldwide Acquisitions took over and has released some films under Destination Films' label, like Blood: The Last Vampire, Black Dynamite and Harry Brown. Other functions took on Destination had spun off into Stage 6 Films, and Affirm Films for faith content. As Destination Films took on the function once served by Triumph Films, the newly-founded Stage 6 Films took on the mantle the Destination once had. Funimation was also acquired by Sony Pictures Television on October 27, 2017 and rebranded to Crunchyroll, LLC on March 1, 2022 after acquiring the eponymous streaming service on August 9, 2021. Currently, Samuel Goldwyn Films holds the rights to the pre-Sony Destination library.

== Filmography ==
=== 1990s ===
Release date	Title	Notes
October 22, 1999	Bats	First Destination film release; international distribution by Columbia TriStar Film Distributors International; currently owned by Samuel Goldwyn Films

=== 2000s ===
Release date	Title	Notes
January 28, 2000	Eye of the Beholder	North American distribution only; produced by Behaviour Worldwide; currently owned by Samuel Goldwyn Films
March 3, 2000	Drowning Mona	North American distribution only; currently owned by Samuel Goldwyn Films
July 26, 2000	Thomas and the Magic Railroad	North American distribution only; produced by Gullane Pictures and Isle of Man Film Commission; currently owned by Shout! Studios and Samuel Goldwyn Films
September 1, 2000	Whipped	North American distribution only; currently owned by Samuel Goldwyn Films
September 29, 2000	Beautiful	currently owned by Samuel Goldwyn Films
April 9, 2002	Shiri	North and Latin American distribution only; theatrical distribution by Samuel Goldwyn Films
April 23, 2002	Metropolis	theatrical distribution by TriStar Pictures
June 4, 2002	Mission Kashmir	North American distribution only
September 3, 2002	Cowboy Up	North American distribution only; currently co-owned by Metro-Goldwyn-Mayer
September 24, 2002	Vampires: Los Muertos	sequel to Vampires by Columbia Pictures in 1998
December 17, 2002	An Evening with Kevin Smith	
December 17, 2002	Buying the Cow	
December 24, 2002	Black Mask 2: City of Masks	distribution outside China, Hong Kong, Taiwan, Japan and Korea only
May 16, 2003	Cowboy Bebop: The Movie	co-distributed with Samuel Goldwyn Films in the US; produced in Japan by Sunrise Animation and Bones
May 23, 2003	The Era of Vampires	distribution outside Italy, Singapore, Malaysia, China, Hong Kong and select other territories only; co-distributed with Samuel Goldwyn Films
September 30, 2003	Scenes of the Crime	
October 17, 2003	Returner	distribution outside Asia only; co-distributed with Samuel Goldwyn Films
February 24, 2004	Memories	
March 2, 2004	Ride or Die	
April 20, 2004	Wild Things 2	sequel to Wild Things by Columbia Pictures in 1998
September 28, 2004	Sniper 3	sequel to Sniper and Sniper 2 by TriStar Pictures in 1993 and 2002
November 23, 2004	Doing Hard Time	
December 29, 2004	A Love Song for Bobby Long	co-production with El Camino Pictures, Crossroads Films, and Bob Yari Productions
February 15, 2005	Into the Sun	
March 25, 2005	D.E.B.S.	co-distributed by Samuel Goldwyn Films, Screen Gems and Anonymous Content
April 26, 2005	Wild Things: Diamonds in the Rough	
May 3, 2005	Vampires: The Turning	
June 24, 2005	Saving Face	co-production with Sony Pictures Classics
July 26, 2005	Steamboy	co-distributed by Triumph Films
September 30, 2005	MirrorMask	co-production with The Jim Henson Company; distributed by Samuel Goldwyn Films
September 30, 2005	Sueño	
October 25, 2005	Single White Female 2: The Psycho	sequel to Single White Female by Columbia Pictures in 1992
December 16, 2005	The Squid and the Whale	co-distributed by Samuel Goldwyn Films
February 10, 2006	London	co-distributed by Samuel Goldwyn Films
April 25, 2006	Final Fantasy VII: Advent Children	
May 23, 2006	Hollow Man 2	sequel to Hollow Man by Columbia Pictures in 2000
August 15, 2006	I'll Always Know What You Did Last Summer	sequel to I Know What You Did Last Summer and I Still Know What You Did Last Summer by Columbia Pictures in 1997 and 1998
August 25, 2006	The Quiet	co-distributed with Sony Pictures Classics
September 5, 2006	Population 436	
September 29, 2006	Facing the Giants	co-distributed by Samuel Goldwyn Films
October 3, 2006	Glass House: The Good Mother	sequel to The Glass House by Columbia Pictures in 2001
January 2, 2007	Shottas	co-distributed by Triumph Films
January 26, 2007	Seraphim Falls	co-distributed by Samuel Goldwyn Films
June 1, 2007	Rise: Blood Hunter	co-distributed by Samuel Goldwyn Films
July 13, 2007	Tekkonkinkreet	
August 31, 2007	The Nines	co-distributed by Newmarket Films
October 5, 2007	The Good Night	co-distributed by Yari Film Group
October 26, 2007	Slipstream	co-distributed by Strand Releasing
November 10, 2007	Bats: Human Harvest	TV premiere on Sci-Fi Channel
November 14, 2007	Southland Tales	co-distributed by Samuel Goldwyn Films
December 7, 2007	Revolver	co-distributed by Samuel Goldwyn Films
December 12, 2007	The Perfect Holiday	co-distributed by Yari Film Group
January 8, 2008	Boogeyman 2	sequel to Boogeyman by Screen Gems in 2005
April 11, 2008	The Take	
June 3, 2008	Wieners	
October 16, 2009	Black Dynamite	

=== 2010s ===
Release date	Title	Notes
April 30, 2010	Harry Brown	U.S. distribution only; co-distributed by Samuel Goldwyn Films
October 29, 2010	Welcome to the Rileys	North American distribution only; co-distributed by Samuel Goldwyn Films
November 5, 2010	Red Hill	U.S. and Latin American distribution only; co-distributed by Strand Releasing
March 11, 2011	Elektra Luxx	North American distribution only; co-distributed by Samuel Goldwyn Films
October 19, 2012	The First Time	North American distribution only; co-distributed by Samuel Goldwyn Films
February 26, 2013	Company of Heroes	
August 16, 2013	Magic Magic	distribution in North and Latin America, Scandinavia, Eastern Europe and South Africa only; produced by Braven Films
September 19, 2014	Space Station 76	
September 30, 2014	Sniper: Legacy	
June 26, 2015	Into the Grizzly Maze	North American distribution only; co-distributed by Vertical Entertainment
July 7, 2015	No Way Jose	
August 7, 2015	Lake Placid vs. Anaconda	
February 12, 2016	Ratter	distribution only; co-distributed in the U.S. by Vertical Entertainment
June 7, 2016	Never Back Down: No Surrender	
August 2, 2016	Sniper: Ghost Shooter	
August 12, 2016	Beyond Valkyrie: Dawn of the 4th Reich	
July 6, 2017	Kill 'Em All	
August 1, 2017	S.W.A.T.: Under Siege	sequel to S.W.A.T. and S.W.A.T.: Firefight by Columbia Pictures and Stage 6 Films in 2003 and 2011
October 3, 2017	Sniper: Ultimate Kill	
October 27, 2017	Crash Pad	distribution only; co-distributed in the U.S. by Vertical Entertainment
February 6, 2018	Accident Man	currently co-owned by Samuel Goldwyn Films
June 3, 2018	The Vanishing of Sidney Hall	international distribution only

=== 2020s ===
Release date	Title	Notes
March 3, 2020	Holly Slept Over	co-production with American Indie and LD Entertainment
June 16, 2020	Sniper: Assassin's End	
November 16, 2021	Never Back Down: Revolt	
May 23, 2022	Agent Game	international distribution only
August 16, 2022	Sniper: Rogue Mission	
October 14, 2022	Accident Man: Hitman's Holiday	co-production with Samuel Goldwyn Films
September 22, 2023	It Lives Inside	distribution in all media excluding airlines in Italy, Greece, Scandinavia, South Africa and select Asian territories including Hong Kong and Japan only
October 10, 2023	Sniper: G.R.I.T. - Global Response & Intelligence Team	
November 23, 2023	The Baker	international distribution only
January 16, 2024	One More Shot	
February 16, 2024	Lights Out	
February 26, 2024	Fear	international distribution only
September 24, 2024	Kill 'Em All 2	
November 25, 2024	1992	international distribution only
December 2, 2024	Crescent City	international distribution only
July 1, 2025	Clown in a Cornfield	international distribution outside the U.K., Ireland, France, Germany, Austria, Switzerland, the Benelux, Eastern Europe, the Baltics, Portugal, Australia, New Zealand and Japan only
