= Wild Things 2 =

- Promotional advertisement
- Written by: Andy Hurst; Ross Helford
- Directed by: Jack Perez
- Starring: Susan Ward; Leila Arcieri; Isaiah Washington
- Music by: John Nau; Andrew Feltenstein
- Country of origin: United States
- Original language: English

Production
- Producer: Marc Bienstock
- Cinematography: Seo Mutarevic
- Editor: Axel Hubert
- Running time: 95 minutes
- Production companies: TriStar Pictures; Destination Films; Mandalay Pictures; Magic Hour Pictures

Original release
- Network: Encore Mystery
- Release: March 6, 2004

Related
- Wild Things (1998); Wild Things: Diamonds in the Rough (2005)

Wild Things 2 is a 2004 erotic thriller television film directed by Jack Perez and starring Susan Ward, Leila Arcieri, Isaiah Washington and Linden Ashby. It is a standalone sequel to Wild Things (1998) and the second installment in the Wild Things series.

The film premiered on Encore Mystery on March 6, 2004, and was released on DVD on April 20. The film was followed by a sequel Wild Things: Diamonds in the Rough (2005), with Linden Ashby returning.

== Plot ==
Brittney Havers, a South Florida high school senior, lives with her wealthy but cruel stepfather, Niles Dunlap, after her mother ran her car off the road in "Gator Alley" and was presumably eaten by alligators a year earlier. When Dunlap is killed in a private plane crash, his will calls for Brittney to receive a small stipend until she finishes college, after which she will receive only $25,000 a year for life from the estate. The rest of Dunlap's assets, totaling $70 million, are to be left to a corporate trust unless a blood heir can be found.

Brittney is threatened at her home by Cuban gambler Cicatriz, to whom Dunlap owed millions. Her brash, relatively poor classmate Maya King suddenly claims to be Dunlap's illegitimate daughter as the result of her mother's extramarital affair. She is ordered by a judge to submit to a DNA test, the result of which backs her claim.

At home, Brittney sees a news report that Cicatriz has been arrested and decides to celebrate. She hears a noise on her way to the wine cellar but it turns out to just be rats. Maya suddenly appears and the girls reveal they are lovers before being joined by Dr. Julian Haynes, who falsified the DNA test. The trio are in cahoots, running a scam to secure and share Dunlap's fortune.

Insurance investigator Terence Bridge, looking into the circumstances of the plane crash, learns from Dunlap's medical records that Dunlap had scarlet fever as a child, one of the side effects of which can be sterility, and asks Haynes how Dunlap could have fathered a child. Haynes gets nervous about the plot unraveling and contacts Maya. He agrees to meet her and Brittney that night at the docks, where Maya shoots him dead. The two girls dispose of his body in Gator Alley.

Bridge learns the entire affair was planned and attempts to expose the murder, but is fired when he cannot provide proof. After finding some of Haynes's blood, he shows up at the Dunlap home and demands half the money in return for not going to the police. Brittney, refusing to give up any of the money, gets a gun and points it at Bridge, but instead kills Maya. She tells Bridge that he has to earn his half. He loads Maya's body into the trunk of his car and they drive off to dispose of it.

When they stop at a traffic light, Brittney gets out of the car and walks away as a police car pulls up behind them. Bridge can do nothing but drive away when the traffic light turns green and the police car honks at him to get moving. Brittney phones in an anonymous tip that Bridge's car trunk has Maya's body in it; he is soon arrested and jailed. A videotape from the Dunlap home security system shows Bridge demanding half of the inheritance money from Brittney and Maya.

Later, Brittney flies off in a private plane with Dunlap, who faked his own death to not only escape Cicatriz but avoid prosecution for misappropriating millions of dollars in corporate funds to pay his gambling debts. Brittney and Dunlap don parachutes, planning to bail out over swampland and disappear together. As he is poised to bail out, she reveals that she packed his chute with newspaper and pushes him from the plane to his death. She then bails out, landing safely in the swamp, where her mother, also very much alive, is waiting for her in a swamp boat.

It is revealed that Brittney and her mother orchestrated everything, including the deaths of Brittney's co-conspirators, in order to steal Dunlap's fortune, and they relax in the sun on a tropical island. Brittney comes down the stairs of their villa overlooking the ocean with two drinks and hands one to her mother. As Brittney watches intently, her mother takes a sip and remarks that the drink is strong. Brittney replies with a wry smile, "They do make them strong here, don't they?"

== Cast ==
- Susan Ward as Brittney Havers
- Leila Arcieri as Maya King
- Isaiah Washington as Terence Bridge
- Linden Ashby as Detective Michael Morrison
- Anthony Denison as Niles Dunlap
- Joe Michael Burke as Dr. Julian Haynes
- Katie Stuart as Shannon
- Faith Salie as Lacey
- Marc Macaulay as Jayson
- Ski Carr as Cicatriz
- Dylan Kussman as Irvin Brillman
- Kimberly Atkinson as Teri Breur
- Ron Dean as Judge Ruben
- Adrianna Banovich as Action News Anchor
- Kathy Neff as Brittney's Mother

== Reception ==
In a negative review, Walter Chaw on Film Freak Central wrote, "Alligator swamps and high school, I get the comparison, but like the first film, Wild Things 2 is coy, smug, and not so much meta as a self-satisfied, misogynistic tease. Those looking for titillation will have to settle for a lot of slo-mo beach volleyball, multiple views of Susan Ward walking around slowly [...] and a brief three-way featuring a body double for [...] Leila Arcieri who drops Arcieri down about two cup sizes [...]"
