= Wild Things: Diamonds in the Rough =

- DVD cover
- Written by: Andy Hurst; Ross Helford
- Directed by: Jay Lowi
- Starring: Sandra McCoy; Sarah Laine; Linden Ashby; Dina Meyer; Brad Johnson
- Music by: Steven M. Stern
- Country of origin: United States
- Original language: English

Production
- Producer: Marc Bienstock
- Cinematography: Hubert Taczanowski
- Editor: Anthony Adler
- Running time: 87 minutes
- Production companies: Destination Films; Mandalay Pictures; Lightning Entertainment

Original release
- Network: Encore Mystery
- Release: February 19, 2005

Related
- Wild Things 2 (2004); Wild Things: Foursome (2010)

Wild Things: Diamonds in the Rough (also known as Wild Things 3) is a 2005 erotic thriller television film directed by Jay Lowi. It is a sequel to Wild Things 2 (2004), and the third installment in the Wild Things series. The film stars Sandra McCoy, Sarah Laine, Dina Meyer and Brad Johnson, while Linden Ashby reprises his role from the previous film.

Like the previous film, the film premiered on Encore Mystery on February 19, 2005, and was released on DVD on April 26.

The film was followed by Wild Things: Foursome in 2010.

== Plot ==
Marie Clifton is set to inherit two diamonds, called the "mother and daughter", which her late mother bestowed to her. Marie's stepfather, Jay Clifton, challenges the will, claiming Marie is not ready for the responsibility, but actually just wants to take the diamonds for himself. At a sexual education seminar at Marie's school, Blue Bay High, physician Dr. Chad Johnson and probation officer Kristen Richards discuss sex crimes, and Richards reveals she was a victim of an anonymous rapist many years ago.

At Marie's swim-meet, Jay encounters towel girl Elena Sandoval and invites her to Marie's eighteenth birthday party. Elena attends the party but is assaulted by Marie, who says that Elena is not welcome. Jay comforts Elena and brings her to the construction site of one of his buildings for privacy. Later, Elena alleges that Jay raped her at the site. Detective Michael Morrison is placed on the case, as is Richards, who is Elena's probation officer. Chad is placed in charge of documenting Elena's injuries, and testifies to the court that Elena was raped.

Marie believes that Elena is doing this for money and tells Jay to pay her off. When Jay admits he is broke, Marie suggests that they sell the diamonds. Jay agrees and revokes his claim to the will, giving Marie custody of the diamonds so she can sell them off. However, this was a ploy between Elena, Marie, and Chad to get the diamonds, and the trio are in a sexual relationship.

Jay believes that Elena will recant her accusation after being paid off, but at the next court session she testifies that he also threatened to kill her. Jay is sent to prison, but Richards is now suspicious of Elena's behavior. Richards and Morrison search Elena's trailer and discover she has gathered information about Kristen's rape, using it to form her testimony. Richards and Morrison discuss their suspicions with Jay and conclude that Marie, Elena, and Chad must be working together.

Richards and Morrison question Chad, who fears they suspect him. He turns on Marie, drugging her and stealing the diamonds. Marie and Elena chase Chad into the woods, where he nearly strangles Elena until Marie kills him with a tire iron. She then meets the diamond buyer Chad set up, but learns that the diamonds are fake. Elena, left to deal with Chad's body, is caught by Richards and Morrison. The two give her a task: wear a wire and get Marie to admit she killed Chad, and the charges against Elena will be lessened.

Elena goes to Marie and plays along with her plan to get the real diamonds from Jay's safe at the construction site. Throughout, Elena repeatedly tries to get Marie to confess, but to no avail. When they finally open the safe, Elena pulls a gun on Marie and flees with the diamonds, prompting Marie to chase her with her own gun. Richards and Morrison, who are listening in from nearby, enter the construction site separately. During the search, Richards finds Marie and shoots her dead. Afterward, Elena claims there were no diamonds, and Richards escorts her from the scene.

At the end, it is revealed that Richards and Elena are mother and daughter; Jay was the man that raped Kristen in the past, conceiving Elena. They dispose of him by dosing his drink and leaving him to fall to his death. During the credits, scenes are shown explaining how they managed to pull their plan off.

== Cast ==
- Sandra McCoy as Elena Sandoval
- Sarah Laine as Marie Clifton
- Linden Ashby as Detective Michael Morrison
- Dina Meyer as Kristen Richards
- Brad Johnson as Jay Clifton
- Ron Melendez as Dr. Chad Johnson
- Michael Mantell as Theo Bloom
- Claire Coffee as Jenny Bellamy
- Nikki Griffin as Risa Howard
- Zakareth Ruben as Julie
- Van Epperson as Principal Phillips
- Maria Cina as Blonde Reporter
- Kymberly Newberry as Judge Wilcox
- Sandra Purpuro as District Attorney Sarah Lovell
- Gary Carlos Cervantes as Davros
- Paul Terrell Clayton as Dammers

== Reception ==
David Nusair wrote in Reel Film Reviews that the film "is the sort of film that delivers exactly what it promises: nudity, rampant sleaziness, and a plethora of twists and turns. As a result, the movie is actually pretty entertaining - albeit in an entirely forgettable, trashy kind of way." He also wrote that, while compared with the first film "it can't quite compete in terms of sheer star power (as nice as it is to see Brad Johnson in something other than a Left Behind flick, he's still no Kevin Bacon, Bill Murray, or even Matt Dillon), Wild Things 3 does feature many similar elements (ie superfluous sex scenes, broad performances, campy dialogue, etc) - enough, at least, to please fans of this ongoing series."
