= Wild Things: Foursome =

- DVD cover
- Directed by: Andy Hurst
- Written by: Monty Featherstone; Howard Zemski
- Produced by: Marc Bienstock
- Starring: Jillian Murray; Marnette Patterson; Ashley Parker Angel; John Schneider
- Cinematography: Jeffrey D. Smith
- Edited by: Anthony Adler
- Music by: Steven M. Stern
- Production companies: Stage 6 Films; RCA Media Group; SG Productions; Mandalay Pictures
- Distributed by: Sony Pictures Home Entertainment
- Release date: June 1, 2010
- Running time: 92 minutes
- Country: United States
- Language: English

Wild Things: Foursome is a 2010 erotic thriller film directed by Andy Hurst and starring Jillian Murray, Marnette Patterson, Ashley Parker Angel and John Schneider. It is a standalone sequel to Wild Things: Diamonds in the Rough (2005) and the fourth and final installment in the Wild Things series. The film was released on DVD on June 1, 2010.

== Plot ==
Carson Wheetly is the son of Ted Wheetly, a wealthy NASCAR racer. Carson suspects his father of murdering his mother to gain her money. After a weekend party at his father's Florida bay house, Carson is arrested for the rape of Brandi Cox. Ted dies during a race and detective Frank Walker investigates his death as being questionable. Ted's lawyer, George Stuben, announces at a will reading that Carson cannot inherit his father's money and estate until he turns thirty, with certain exceptions for marriage. Carson and George convince Brandi to settle her rape case for five million dollars, plus an additional $100,000 that the lawyer keeps in a locking hard case.

Carson and Brandi meet in her apartment, celebrate the success of the embezzlement, and are joined by his girlfriend, Rachel Thomas; they have sex in the shower and are further joined by Linda Dobson, who was at the party. Later, Carson and Rachel marry so he can inherit, but she and Brandi lure him to a cheap motel in the Everglades and murder him, leaving a forged suicide note; Rachel thus inherits the fortune, but Walker keeps investigating.

Brandi lures Rachel to an old cabin in the nearby swamps with the pretense of sex; they both try to kill each other, and though Brandi gets the upper hand, they are found and arrested. Walker interrogates them separately, having deduced that they grew up together and plotted to find a wealthy man to marry and murder. Brandi incriminates Rachel by revealing hidden video CDs that show Carson and Rachel tampering with Ted's car to cause his death, as well as Rachel's bloodstained blouse from the motel; Rachel is sent to prison and Brandi is released.

After closing the case, Walker retires and joins Brandi on a motor launch boat, revealing himself to be a corrupt cop who helped her incriminate Rachel so he could get a share of the Wheetly fortune. However, while at sea, Brandi fatally stabs Walker and throws his body overboard. She flees to an island in the Caribbean, where George is waiting for her; he has emptied all of his shell accounts to bring the Wheetly money into his personal Cayman Islands account. He betrays her by planting a bomb in the boat, which detonates as she drives away, killing her.

Scenes over the end credits reveal George as the true mastermind, a career con-artist who impersonated a lawyer, approaching Brandi, who held a grudge against the Wheetly family, and having her approach Rachel. The girls deceived Carson into believing Ted murdered his mother; Brandi then brought false rape charges against Carson to blackmail him into marrying Rachel and to get a share of Ted's money. George worked behind the scenes by changing the nature of Ted's will and planting evidence for Walker to find; Brandi had learned Walker was corrupt and could be swayed by the offer of money. Rachel is found dead of a seeming suicide in prison, with the implication that George had her murdered. After killing Brandi, George walks off with all of the $154 million alongside Linda, his wife and co-conspirator.

== Cast ==
- Jillian Murray as Brandi Cox
- Marnette Patterson as Rachel Thomas
- Ashley Parker Angel as Carson Wheetly
- John Schneider as Detective Frank Walker
- Ethan Smith as George Stuben
- Jessie Nickson as Linda Dobson
- Cameron Daddo as Ted Wheetly
- Marc Macaulay as Captain Blanchard
- Josh Randall as Shane Hendricks

== Reception ==
David Nusair of Reel Film Reviews gave it two out of four stars and called it "a surprisingly tedious endeavor that boasts so many similarities to its 1998 predecessor that it often feels like a remake". R.L. Shaffer of IGN gave it a 2 out of 10 rating and wrote: "We've seen it all before, and under better circumstances" and recommended that viewers "watch a softcore skin flick on Cinemax and forget this film exists."
