= Wild Things (film) =

1998 film by John McNaughton

- Theatrical release poster
- Directed by: John McNaughton
- Written by: Stephen Peters
- Produced by: Rodney M. Liber; Steven A. Jones
- Starring: Kevin Bacon; Matt Dillon; Neve Campbell; Theresa Russell; Denise Richards; Daphne Rubin-Vega; Robert Wagner; Bill Murray
- Cinematography: Jeffrey L. Kimball
- Edited by: Elena Maganini
- Music by: George S. Clinton
- Production company: Mandalay Entertainment
- Distributed by: Columbia Pictures (through Sony Pictures Releasing)
- Release date: March 20, 1998
- Running time: 108 minutes
- Country: United States
- Language: English
- Budget: $20 million
- Box office: $67.2 million

Wild Things is a 1998 American erotic thriller film directed by John McNaughton and starring Matt Dillon, Kevin Bacon, Neve Campbell, Denise Richards, Theresa Russell, Robert Wagner, and Bill Murray. It follows a high school guidance counselor in South Florida who is accused of rape by two female students and a series of subsequent revelations after a police officer begins investigating the alleged crimes. Wild Things was released by Sony Pictures Releasing on March 20, 1998 and received mixed to positive reviews from critics while grossing $67.2 million against a $20 million budget. The film was followed by two television film sequels Wild Things 2 (2004) and Wild Things: Diamonds in the Rough (2005), and a direct-to-DVD standalone sequel Wild Things: Foursome (2010). Since its release, the original film has been regarded as a cult classic.

== Plot ==
In the upscale Miami suburb of Blue Bay, handsome high school guidance counselor Sam Lombardo, who is known for his popularity among the female students as well as some of the older women in the area due to his sex appeal, holds a school assembly on sex crimes. Afterwards, popular and wealthy cheerleader Kelly Van Ryan accuses Lombardo of raping her; outcast student and juvenile delinquent Suzie Toller, who comes from a poor family in the Everglades, makes a similar accusation. Kelly's vindictive mother, real estate heiress Sandra, goes on a relentless crusade to take Sam down. Sam faces harassment, is placed on administrative leave, gets blacklisted from various local hot spots, is run off the road in his car, and is beaten by Sandra's pool boy, Frankie Condo, before being jailed. Sam hires attorney Kenneth Bowden to defend him.

During the trial, Suzie succumbs to pressure during cross-examination and admits that she and Kelly concocted false allegations to get revenge on Sam. Suzie was seeking revenge for Sam's failure to bail her out of jail on a minor drug charge, and Kelly was retaliating out of jealousy for Sam's affair with her mother. Both girls face charges of perjury. Sam and Kenneth negotiate an $8.5 million settlement for defamation, which Sandra pays out using funds from a trust Kelly would receive only upon Sandra's death. In spite of the win, Sam loses his home and his job, but after the payout, it is revealed that Sam and the girls were accomplices, using the trial to extort money from Sandra.

Police detective Ray Duquette suspects the trio of working a scam. Against the wishes of the district attorney, he continues investigating Sam. He tells Kelly and Suzie that Sam has already transferred the money to an off-shore account. Suzie panics and goes to Kelly, who comforts her. Kelly, however, calls Sam and tells him they may have to get rid of Suzie. Suzie attacks Kelly in the pool, and they fight, but end up having sex, unaware Ray is watching them. A few nights later, Sam bludgeons Suzie to death on the beach while Kelly waits nearby. The two then drive to the swamp, where Sam disposes of a plastic-wrapped body.

Ray and his partner, Detective Gloria Perez, investigate Suzie's disappearance. Her blood and teeth are found at the beach, while her car is located abandoned at a bus terminal. The D.A.'s office again insists that Ray drop the case, but he asks Gloria to watch Sam. Sam shows Gloria his counseling file on Kelly, which suggests she is troubled and violent. Meanwhile, Ray goes to the Van Ryans' guest house to confront the scared and upset Kelly, but they end up shooting each other. Sandra rushes over as Ray stumbles out of the house with a gunshot wound to the shoulder, while Sandra discovers Kelly dead from two shots to the chest. Ray claims he was forced to shoot Kelly in self-defense. No charges are filed against him, but he is discharged from the force for disobeying orders.

It is revealed that Sam is in cahoots with Ray. Although Sam is displeased that Ray killed Kelly instead of simply framing her for Suzie's murder, he agrees that they now have fewer loose ends to deal with. The two go sailing on Sam's boat, where Sam attempts to kill Ray. When Ray fights back, he is shot and killed with a speargun by Suzie, who staged her murder with Sam. Suzie reveals she was motivated to kill Ray to avenge the murder of her best friend, Davey, whom Ray wrongly shot, then staged as a self-defense killing. Sam reluctantly accepts a drink from Suzie, who assures him she will not double-cross him; however, upon drinking it, he realizes she has poisoned it before Suzie knocks him overboard and sails into the sunset, leaving Sam's body to float in the ocean. In the Everglades, Gloria learns the truth about Duquette’s corruption and his crimes.

Suzie was the ultimate mastermind of the plot. Upon finding out that Sam and Kelly were in a sexual relationship, Suzie blackmailed Sam with photographs of the two using drugs during sex, convincing him to help with her scheme. Suzie subsequently orchestrated the meeting between Sam and Ray at a local bar. During her staged murder on the beach, Suzie pulled out her own teeth with pliers to make her death appear legitimate. Ray shot Kelly first before shooting himself in the shoulder to pretend he killed her in self-defense. With Kelly, Ray, and Sam all dead, Suzie is met by Kenneth, who gives her a briefcase full of cash and a check for millions of dollars. As she leaves, he tells her to "be good".

== Cast ==
- Kevin Bacon as Ray Duquette, a corrupt Blue Bay police detective in the Sex Crimes Unit
- Matt Dillon as Sam Lombardo, the popular high school guidance counselor shown to be a chick magnet staging a scam with Suzie and Kelly
- Neve Campbell as Suzie Toller, a high school outcast and troubled teen staging a scam with Sam and Kelly
- Theresa Russell as Sandra Van Ryan, a wealthy elitist real estate mogul and widow with serious power in her hands
- Denise Richards as Kelly Van Ryan, Sandra's daughter who is a high school cheerleader staging a scam with Sam and Suzie
- Daphne Rubin-Vega as Gloria Perez, Duquette's partner in the Blue Bay PD
- Carrie Snodgress as Ruby, a tavern owner in the Glades
- Jeff Perry as Bryce Hunter, the District Attorney
- Robert Wagner as Tom Baxter, Sandra's attorney
- Bill Murray as Kenneth Bowden, Lombardo's attorney

== Analysis and themes ==
Literary scholar John Thorburn notes that Wild Things is loosely based on several figures in Greek tragedies, namely Medea, whom he describes the character of Suzie as a "modern-day version of". Suzie is met by police, Duquette and Perez, while reading Death on the Installment Plan. He also notes that Kelly functions as a Phaedra-like figure, while Sam exemplifies both Jason and Hippolytus. Thorburn suggests that the film's "most under-appreciated element is screenwriter Stephen Peters’s obvious debt to classical mythology, tragedy and, especially, two Euripidean plays, Medea (431 BC) and Hippolytus (428 BC)."

== Production ==
=== Development ===
The film's screenplay was written by screenwriter Stephen Peters, who had previously written the independent film Dead Center (1993). John McNaughton, who had garnered acclaim for the horror film Henry: Portrait of a Serial Killer (1986), became involved with the project as he was seeking to make a more mainstream feature.

"I was at a point in my career where I needed to do a commercial picture, and that was one of the key reasons I chose the film. I really liked the script, but it was also me asking myself 'What sells? Sex and violence. You want sex and violence? Well, here you go. How much can you take?'"

— Director John McNaughton on his motivation to direct the film

Kem Nunn was appointed to perform some rewrites of Peters's original version. McNaughton commented that Peters's original draft "is brilliant on plot and we didn't change any of it, but I felt Kem Nunn was stronger on texture and character and place. The producer, Peter Guber, sent us off to Florida, where none of us had spent much time and we spent ten days there getting shepherded around to places and meeting people who were like people in the story. When I read the script I thought 'As crazy as it is, I do believe it could happen in the world that we live in.' Once I believe that a story can happen in the real world, then I know how to direct it." Kevin Bacon, who also executive produced, described the script as "the trashiest thing he had ever read ... Every few pages, there was another surprise."

The original screenplay featured a gay scene between Sergeant Duquette and Sam Lombardo near the end of the film, in which the men kiss in the shower, revealing that—similarly to Suzie and Kelly—the two had a homosexual relationship that allowed Lombardo to prey on Duquette in order to manipulate him and ultimately con him out of the money. According to Kevin Bacon, the scene was modified to eliminate any suggestion of a sexual relationship between the men, as the film's financiers "didn't like the idea of men making out. They felt it went too far." However, in an interview in 2023, the director said that the modification occurred because one of the two actors had objected to the sexual aspect of the scene just before the cameras rolled.

=== Casting ===
Robert Downey Jr. was the first choice for the role of Sam Lombardo, which ultimately went to Matt Dillon. Downey was considered because of his highly publicized drug problems, and although he was in recovery he was seen as too great an insurance risk. Producer Rodney Liber said "we couldn't make it work", and the production company even offered to put up some of the money but "There were just too many lawyers and insurance people and bond-company people involved."

John McNaughton said Denise Richards' first audition was good but her much improved second audition convinced them to cast her. Richards' lawyer negotiated a detailed contract about how much nudity would be filmed, including the option to use a body double. Richards did not use a double and filmed the scene herself after drinking a pitcher of margaritas with Neve Campbell. Campbell's contract had a strict no-nudity clause. Campbell took on the role wanting to challenge herself, to do something different from her Party of Five character, and to avoid being typecast. Natasha Lyonne also auditioned for Suzie. Bacon also had a no nudity clause in his contract but without giving it much thought allowed McNaughton to use the shot that he thought looked best, and a moment of frontal nudity was included in the film. He was surprised by how many questions he got about it at the American press showing, and noted that the European press did not ask about it at all.

=== Filming ===
The film was shot in the spring and summer of 1997, between April 21 and July 16. It is unclear whether or not Neve Campbell was still working on the film in the latter stages of shooting, since her film Scream 2 began shooting on June 16, 1997, whilst Wild Things was also still shooting. Filming in the Everglades proved difficult due to severe weather conditions. A tornado almost crushed a couple of trailers. McNaughton said production had to be halted and the police called when a real dead body floated into view. In April 2025, Kevin Bacon told in an interview that a dead body was found in a swamp during filming of one of the night scenes.

== Music ==
The background score by George S. Clinton was released on April 7, 1998, by soundtrack label Varèse Sarabande. Some of his score was a collaboration with the jazz rock band Morphine. Although no accompanying soundtrack album was released, songs by various different artists were briefly used throughout the film, including songs by Barry White, Iggy Pop, K's Choice, Lauren Christy, Smash Mouth, Sugar Ray, Third Eye Blind, Tito Puente, and Transister.

== Release ==
=== Box office ===
The film grossed $30.1 million in the United States and Canada and $37.1 million internationally for a worldwide total of $67.2 million.

=== Critical response ===
On Rotten Tomatoes the film has an approval rating of 64% based on reviews from 121 critics, with an average rating of 5.80/10. The site's consensus states: "Wild Things is a delightfully salacious, flesh-exposed romp that also requires a high degree of love for trash cinema." On Metacritic, it has a score of 51/100 based on reviews from 20 critics, indicating "mixed or average reviews". Audiences polled by CinemaScore gave the film a grade "C+" on scale of A to F.

Roger Ebert gave the film three stars out of four, praising McNaughton's directing and the plot twists. He described it as "lurid trash, with a plot so twisted they're still explaining it during the closing titles. It's like a three-way collision between a softcore sex film, a soap opera and a B-grade noir. I liked it." Gene Siskel gave the film a marginal recommendation. Janet Maslin of The New York Times praised Campbell and Richard's performances, and also McNaughton's direction for adding "a decadent gloss to this far-fetched, quintuple-crossing tale", although she criticized the plot as being "loony".

In The Washington Post, Desson Howe described the film as "clearly a crock", and although it "may not have a single redeeming feature, but it doesn't have a dull moment, either." In the same newspaper, Stephen Hunter described the film as being "as tawdry as someone else's lingerie, yet not without a certain prurient watchability". The Orlando Sentinel said that the film, overall, missed the mark, but that Murray in his small role manages to steal the show. Variety praised the casting of Dillon, Bacon, Campbell, Richards, Russell, Murray, and Snodgress, stating "you have an ensemble that appears to be enjoying the challenge of offbeat roles and unusual material. There's not a wrong note struck by the game group of players", and also praised the film as "original" with a "glossy, unreal quality that nicely dovetails with the pulse of the drama".

=== Awards ===
George S. Clinton was nominated for Best Music at 25th Saturn Awards, but lost to John Carpenter for Vampires, another film from Columbia Pictures. The film was nominated for Best Kiss at the MTV Movie Awards. At the 1998 Los Angeles Film Critics Association Awards, the film won a Blockbuster Entertainment Awards for Daphne Rubin-Vega in the category "Favorite Supporting Actress – Suspense" while Bill Murray won the Best Supporting Actor for Rushmore and Wild Things.

=== Home media ===
Wild Things was released on VHS on September 8, 1998, by Columbia TriStar Home Video. Sony Pictures Home Entertainment released the film in a standard DVD edition, followed by an extended edition featuring the unrated cut of the film in 2004. The unrated cut was subsequently released by Sony Pictures Home Entertainment on Blu-ray in 2007. In May 2022, Arrow Films released Wild Things in a limited 4K UHD Blu-ray edition featuring both the theatrical and extended unrated cuts of the film.

== Legacy ==
In a retrospective on the film celebrating its twentieth anniversary, Entertainment Weekly writer Chris Nashawaty wrote that Wild Things marked a peak in lurid sex-themed thriller films in the late-1990s, summarizing: "As a rule, movies like Wild Things fight an uphill battle with critics who would want to seem above titillation. But this was one of those rare films whose underlying smarts couldn't be denied." McNaughton commented in 2018 that he considered Wild Things his "most political film" due to its focus on social class, concluding: "Who wins? The girl from the trailer park! She’s all alone on the ninety foot sail boat, out on the Caribbean. Pretty much everyone else is dead. That was the nineties, with the concentration of wealth. But the girl from the trailer park takes ’em all down. You know, I’m from the striving working class. A lot of the kids I grew up with, the parents didn’t care if their kid dropped out of school. But some of us had parents who insisted their children have an education, go to college, escape all that. So that’s where my heart always lies."

=== Related works ===
The film was followed by three sequels: Wild Things 2 and Wild Things: Diamonds in the Rough both premiered on Encore Mystery in 2004 and 2005, respectively and Wild Things: Foursome was released on DVD in 2010. The sequels recycled much of the plot, dialogue, and direction of the first film, albeit with different actors. All three films take place in Blue Bay and its high school, and include the Blue Bay Police Department (BBPD). In 2006, the producers tried to develop a spiritual successor and John McNaughton was in talks to again direct a script by Stephen Peters titled "Backstabbers". Richards and Campbell were also in talks to star, but the movie was never made.

== Sources ==
- Thorburn, John (2010). "John McNaughton's Wild Things: Pop Culture Echoes of Medea in the 1990s" ( (PDF)). In Bartel, Heike (ed.). Unbinding Medea. New York: Routledge. pp. 113–123. ISBN 978-0-367-60361-8. Archived from the original on May 27, 2022.
