= Sniper (film series) =

Series of action and war films

- Official film series logo
- Created by: Michael Frost Beckner; Crash Leyland
- Original work: Sniper (1993)
- Owner: Sony Pictures Entertainment
- Years: 1993–present

Films and television
- Film(s): Sniper (1993)
- Television film(s): Sniper 2 (2002)
- Direct-to-video: Sniper 3 (2004); Sniper: Reloaded (2011); Sniper: Legacy (2014); Sniper: Ghost Shooter (2016); Sniper: Ultimate Kill (2017); Sniper: Assassin's End (2020); Sniper: Rogue Mission (2022); Sniper: G.R.I.T. – Global Response & Intelligence Team (2023); Sniper: The Last Stand (2025); Sniper: No Nation (2026)

Sniper is a series of action and war films beginning with the 1993 film Sniper, which center upon the characters of Master Gunnery Sergeant Thomas Beckett (Tom Berenger) and Gunnery Sergeant Brandon Beckett (Chad Michael Collins), who work as Force Reconnaissance Scout Snipers in the United States Marine Corps.

== Films ==
Film	U.S. release date	Director(s)	Screenwriter(s)	Producer(s)
Sniper	January 29, 1993	Luis Llosa	Michael Frost Beckner & Crash Leyland	Robert L. Rosen
Sniper 2	December 28, 2002	Craig R. Baxley	Ron Mita & Jim McClain	Carol Kottenbrook & Scott Einbinder
Sniper 3	September 28, 2004	P. J. Pesce	J.S. Cardone & Ross Helford	Carol Kottenbrook & Scott Einbinder
Sniper: Reloaded	April 26, 2011	Claudio Fäh	John Fasano	Claudio Fäh & David Wicht
Sniper: Legacy	September 30, 2014	Don Michael Paul	John Fasano & Don Michael Paul	Jeffery Beach, Phillip J. Roth & Scott Einbinder
Sniper: Ghost Shooter	August 2, 2016	Don Michael Paul	Chris Hauty	Jeffery Beach & Phillip Roth
Sniper: Ultimate Kill	October 3, 2017	Claudio Fäh	Chris Hauty	David Zelon
Sniper: Assassin's End	June 16, 2020	Kaare Andrews	Oliver Thompson	Greg Malcolm, Vicki Sotheran & Oliver Thompson
Sniper: Rogue Mission	August 16, 2022	Oliver Thompson	Oliver Thompson	Rhonda Baker, Bay Dariz & Mark Montague
Sniper: G.R.I.T. – Global Response & Intelligence Team	September 26, 2023	Oliver Thompson	Oliver Thompson	Bay Dariz & Paul Parker
Sniper: The Last Stand	January 21, 2025	Danishka Esterhazy	Sean Wathen	Lance Samuels
Sniper: No Nation	April 7, 2026	Trevor Calverley	Sean Wathen	Lance Samuels

=== Sniper (1993) ===
Master Gunnery Sergeant Thomas Beckett, an experienced sniper, and Richard Miller are sent on a mission to assassinate a Panamanian General.

=== Sniper 2 (2002) ===
Thomas Beckett and Jake Cole are tasked with assassinating a Serbian general responsible for ethnic cleansing attacks.

=== Sniper 3 (2004) ===
Sniper Thomas Beckett is hired by NSA officials William Avery and Richard Addis to perform a covert operation to eliminate a suspected terrorist kingpin in the People's Republic of Vietnam who was providing support for Jemaah Islamiyah.

=== Sniper: Reloaded (2011) ===
With the assistance of Richard Miller, Marine Sergeant Brandon Beckett, son of Thomas Beckett, takes up the mantle set by his father and goes on a mission of his own.

=== Sniper: Legacy (2014) ===
After military leaders are assassinated, Gunnery Sergeant Brandon Beckett receives word that his father is one. Attempting to track down the assassin, Brandon finds out that his father is not dead, realizing that he is being used as bait.

=== Sniper: Ghost Shooter (2016) ===
Gunnery Sergeant Brandon Beckett is given yet another mission where he is tasked with protecting a Georgian gas pipeline from Arab-sponsored terrorists; however, things become complicated when a professional terrorist sniper named Ravshan Gazakov enters the fray.

=== Sniper: Ultimate Kill (2017) ===
Master Sergeant Brandon Beckett is tasked with protecting a DEA agent from a drug cartel sniper, known as "The Devil".

=== Sniper: Assassin's End (2020) ===
Legendary sniper Thomas Beckett and his son, Special Ops sniper Brandon Beckett, are on the run from the CIA, Russian mercenaries, and a Yakuza-trained assassin with sniper skills that rival both legendary sharp shooters.

=== Sniper: Rogue Mission (2022) ===
After discovering a human sex trafficking ring working with a corrupt agent, Brandon Beckett teams up with allies from his past, Agent Zeke "Zero" Rosenberg and Yuki "Lady Death" Mifune, to discover the identity of the agent and stop the ring.

=== Sniper: G.R.I.T. – Global Response & Intelligence Team (2023) ===
When an international terrorist cult threatens global political stability and kidnaps a fellow agent, ace sniper Brandon Beckett and the newly formed Global Response & Intelligence Team (G.R.I.T.) — led by Colonel Stone must travel across the world to Malta, infiltrate the cult, and take out its leader to free Lady Death and stop the global threat.

=== Sniper: The Last Stand (2025) ===
To stop an arms dealer from unleashing a deadly superweapon, Brandon Beckett and Agent Zero are deployed to Costa Verde to lead a group of elite soldiers against an unrelenting militia. Taking an untested sniper under his wing, Beckett faces his newest challenge: giving orders instead of receiving them. With both time and ammo running low in a race to save humanity, the team must overcome all odds just to survive.

=== Sniper: No Nation (2026) ===
A covert operation in Costa Verde explodes into an international scandal, and the U.S. government responds by disavowing the Global Response & Intelligence Team (G.R.I.T.), branding its operatives as terrorists. Hunted by the very country he served, Brandon Beckett goes AWOL only to learn that the Phoenix Rebellion, his last remaining allies, has been decimated by the Iron Legion, a mercenary force working for Costa Verde’s ruthless Prime Minister. With fellow soldiers imprisoned and scheduled for public execution, Brandon reunites with his father, legendary sniper Thomas Beckett, brother-in-arms Agent Zero, and a handful of rebels for an off-the-books rescue mission against impossible odds. As time runs out for his friends and global tensions rise, Brandon faces his most dangerous fight yet — without a flag, without backup, and without mercy.

== Cast and crew ==
=== Principal cast ===
Characters	Films											
Characters	Sniper	Sniper 2	Sniper 3	Sniper: Reloaded	Sniper: Legacy	Sniper: Ghost Shooter	Sniper: Ultimate Kill	Sniper: Assassin's End	Sniper: Rogue Mission	Sniper: G.R.I.T. – Global Response & Intelligence Team	Sniper: The Last Stand	Sniper: No Nation
Characters	1993	2002	2004	2011	2014	2016	2017	2020	2022	2023	2025	2026
MGySgt. Thomas J. "Tom" Beckett	Tom Berenger	Tom Berenger	Tom Berenger	Mentioned	Tom Berenger	Mentioned	Tom Berenger	Tom Berenger			Mentioned	Tom Berenger
Sgt. Brandon Beckett				Chad Michael Collins	Chad Michael Collins	Chad Michael Collins	Chad Michael Collins	Chad Michael Collins	Chad Michael Collins	Chad Michael Collins	Chad Michael Collins	Chad Michael Collins
Agent Richard Miller	Billy Zane	Mentioned		Billy Zane		Billy Zane	Billy Zane					
Col. Chester Van Damme	J. T. Walsh											
Cpl. Doug Papich	Aden Young											
Jake Cole		Bokeem Woodbine										
Pavel		Tamás Puskás										
CIA Agent James Eckles		Dan Butler										
Col. Dan McKenna		Linden Ashby	Mentioned									
CIA Director Bill Avery			Denis Arndt									
Paul "Finn" Finnegan			John Doman									
Det. Quan			Byron Mann									
Lt. Ellen Abramowitz				Annabel Wright								
Martin Chandler				Patrick Lyster								
Col. Ralf Jäger				Richard Sammel								
Maj. Guy Bidwell					Dominic Mafham	Dominic Mafham						
Col. Gabriel Stone					Dennis Haysbert	Dennis Haysbert		Mentioned	Dennis Haysbert	Dennis Haysbert	Mentioned	
Kate Estrada							Danay García					
Agent John Samson							Joe Lando					
Agent Zeke "Zero" Rosenberg								Ryan Robbins	Ryan Robbins	Ryan Robbins	Ryan Robbins	Ryan Robbins
Yuki "Lady Death" Mifune								Sayaka Akimoto	Sayaka Akimoto	Luna Fujimoto		Mentioned
Gildie									Brendan Sexton III			
Pete									Josh Brener	Josh Brener	Mentioned	Josh Brener
Nova											Manuel Rodriguez-Saenz	Manuel Rodriguez-Saenz

=== Additional crew ===
Crew/detail	Film											
Crew/detail	Sniper	Sniper 2	Sniper 3	Sniper: Reloaded	Sniper: Legacy	Sniper: Ghost Shooter	Sniper: Ultimate Kill	Sniper: Assassin's End	Sniper: Rogue Mission	Sniper: G.R.I.T. – Global Response & Intelligence Team	Sniper: The Last Stand	Sniper: No Nation
Director	Luis Llosa	Craig R. Baxley	P. J. Pesce	Claudio Fäh	Don Michael Paul	Don Michael Paul	Claudio Fäh	Kaare Andrews	Oliver Thompson	Oliver Thompson	Danishka Esterhazy	Trevor Calverley
Composer(s)	Gary Chang	Gary Chang	Tim Jones	David Safritz; Marcus Trampp	Frederik Wiedmann	Frederik Wiedmann	Frederik Wiedmann	Patric Caird	Oliver Thompson	Robert Allaire	Andries Smit	Daniel Caleb; Sean Ou Tim
Writer	Michael Frost Beckner; Crash Leyland	Ron Mita; Jim McClain	J. S. Cardone; Ross Helford	Screenplay; John Fasano Story by Ross Helford; John Fasano	Screenplay; John Fasano; Don Michael Paul Story by John Fasano	Chris Hauty	Chris Hauty	Oliver Thompson	Oliver Thompson	Oliver Thompson	Sean Wathen	Sean Wathen
Characters by	Michael Frost Beckner; Crash Leyland	Michael Frost Beckner and Crash Leyland	Michael Frost Beckner and Crash Leyland	Michael Frost Beckner and Crash Leyland	Michael Frost Beckner and Crash Leyland	Michael Frost Beckner and Crash Leyland	Michael Frost Beckner and Crash Leyland	Michael Frost Beckner and Crash Leyland	Michael Frost Beckner and Crash Leyland	Michael Frost Beckner and Crash Leyland	Michael Frost Beckner and Crash Leyland	Michael Frost Beckner and Crash Leyland
