= Sniper: Reloaded =

2011 film by Claudio Fäh

- Official DVD cover
- Directed by: Claudio Fäh
- Screenplay by: John Fasano
- Story by: Ross Helford; John Fasano
- Based on: Characters created by Michael Frost Beckner; Crash Leyland
- Produced by: Claudio Fäh; David Wicht
- Starring: Chad Michael Collins; Richard Sammel; Annabel Wright; Billy Zane
- Cinematography: Lorenzo Senatore
- Edited by: William Flicker
- Music by: Marcus Trumpp; Mark Sayfritz
- Production companies: Stage 6 Films; ApolloMovie Beteiligungs; Film Afrika Worldwide
- Distributed by: Sony Pictures Home Entertainment
- Release date: April 26, 2011
- Running time: 91 minutes
- Countries: South Africa; United States; Germany
- Language: English

Sniper: Reloaded is a 2011 American direct to video action film which was directed by Claudio Fäh and was the fourth installment in the Sniper film series and a sequel to Sniper 3 (2004). This film is the first in the series of Sniper that does not feature the character of Thomas Beckett, who was portrayed by Tom Berenger.

Instead, it introduces his son Brandon, who was portrayed by Chad Michael Collins. Also, Billy Zane reprises his role as Richard Miller from the first film. The film was shot from 1 March 2010 to 3 April 2010 on location in Johannesburg, South Africa. It was released on DVD on April 26, 2011.

== Plot ==
Marine Sgt. Brandon Beckett (Collins), the son of the previous Sniper film's protagonist Thomas Beckett (Tom Berenger), takes up the mantle set by his father and goes on a mission of his own. While working with the UN Forces in the Democratic Republic of the Congo, Brandon Beckett receives orders to rescue a European farmer, Jean van Brunt (Rob Fruithoff), in the middle of hostile rebel territory.

When he and his men arrive at the farm, a mysterious sniper ambushes them, wounding Beckett and killing everyone else. With the help of his father's former protégé, sniper instructor Richard Miller (Billy Zane), and UN Lieutenant Ellen Abramowitz (Annabel Wright) Beckett sets out on a personal mission to avenge the deaths of his team members.

In the resulting climax of the film, Beckett learns the identity of the sniper, ex-Marine Vincent “The Italian” Masiello (Justin Strydom), a former student of Miller's who was acting under the orders of United Nations Colonel Ralf Jäger (Richard Sammel) to cover up an arms dealing conspiracy supplying weapons to both sides of an ongoing civil war. The mysterious sniper is finally killed by Brandon.

Shortly after apprehending Jäger, Beckett is offered the job by Miller for Special Operations.

== Cast ==
- Chad Michael Collins as Sergeant Brandon Beckett
- Billy Zane as Major Richard Miller
- Richard Sammel as Colonel Ralf Jäger
- Patrick Lyster as Martin Chandler
- Annabel Wright as Lieutenant Ellen Abramowitz
- Kayla Privett as Kelli Van Brunt
- Justin Strydom as Vincent “The Italian” Masiello
- Conrad Kemp as Captain Dustin Nelson
- Hlomla Dandala as Kyle Brown
- Nic Rasenti as Vincent Capobianco
- Ian Van Der Heyden as Patrick Mundy
- Justin Shaw as Martin Hoag
- Rob Fruithof as Jean Van Brunt
- Khulum M. Skenjana as Captain Sporo Ngoba
- Clyde Berning as Marine Sniper Nakelski
- Martin Le Maitre as JAG Hiram Clarke
- Adrian Waldron as SOCOM Commander

== Sequel ==
A sequel titled Sniper: Legacy, was released in 2014.
