= Sniper: Assassin's End =

2020 film by Kaare Andrews

- Official DVD cover
- Directed by: Kaare Andrews
- Written by: Oliver Thompson
- Based on: Characters created by Michael Frost Beckner; Crash Leyland
- Produced by: Greg Malcolm; Vicki Sotheran
- Starring: Chad Michael Collins; Tom Berenger; Sayaka Akimoto; Ryan Robbins; Lochlyn Munro; Emily Tennant; Vincent Gale; Michael Jonsson
- Cinematography: Stirling Bancroft
- Edited by: Greg Ng
- Music by: Patric Caird
- Production company: Destination Films
- Distributed by: Sony Pictures Home Entertainment
- Release date: June 16, 2020
- Running time: 95 minutes
- Country: United States
- Languages: English; Japanese

Sniper: Assassin's End is a 2020 American direct-to-video action film directed by Kaare Andrews and starring Chad Michael Collins, Tom Berenger, and Sayaka Akimoto. The film is the eighth installment of the Sniper film series and a sequel to Sniper: Ultimate Kill (2017).

== Plot ==
Special Ops Sniper Brandon Beckett is set up as the prime suspect for the murder of a foreign dignitary on the eve of signing a high-profile trade agreement with the United States. Narrowly escaping death, Beckett realizes that there may be a dark operative working within the government and partners with the only person whom he can trust, his father, legendary Sniper Master Gunnery Sgt. Thomas Beckett. Both Becketts are on the run from the CIA, Russian mercenaries, and a Yakuza-trained assassin with sniper skills that rival both legendary sharpshooters.

== Cast ==
- Chad Michael Collins as Sergeant Brandon Beckett, a MARSOC Scout Sniper
- Sayaka Akimoto as Yuki "Lady Death" Mifune, a Yakuza sniper and assassin
- Ryan Robbins as Agent Zeke "Zero" Rosenberg, a DHS operative
- Lochlyn Munro as Agent John Franklin
- Emily Tennant as Agent Juliet Clover
- Michael Jonsson as Drake Phoenix
- Vincent Gale as Donald South
- Tom Berenger as Master Gunnery Sergeant Thomas J. "Tom" Beckett, a former USMC Force Recon Scout Sniper

== Production ==
A hand double with a missing index finger plays Berenger's character in close-ups.

== Release ==
The film was released to Blu-ray, DVD, and digital platforms on June 16, 2020, and reached #1 on iTunes in September 2020.

== Sequel ==
A sequel titled Sniper: Rogue Mission, was released in 2022.
