= Sniper 2 =

- Official DVD cover
- Based on: Characters by Michael Frost Beckner; Crash Leyland
- Written by: Ron Mita; Jim McClain
- Directed by: Craig R. Baxley
- Starring: Tom Berenger; Bokeem Woodbine; Dan Butler; Linden Ashby; Erika Marozsán; Tamás Puskás
- Music by: Gary Chang
- Country of origin: United States
- Original language: English

Production
- Producers: Carol Kottenbrook; Scott Einbinder
- Cinematography: David Connell
- Editor: Sonny Baskin
- Running time: 91 minutes
- Production company: TriStar Pictures

Original release
- Network: Cinemax
- Release: October 4, 2002

Related
- Sniper (1993); Sniper 3 (2004)

Sniper 2 is a 2002 American made-for-television action film directed by Craig R. Baxley and starring Tom Berenger, Bokeem Woodbine, Dan Butler and Linden Ashby. The film premiered on Cinemax, on December 28, 2002 and was released to video and DVD on March 11, 2003, by Columbia TriStar Home Entertainment. This would be the final Sniper film to be released by the original film’s distributor, TriStar Pictures before Destination Films handled the rest of the sequels.

The film follows a Marine sniper and a spotter who are tasked with assassinating a Serbian general responsible for ethnic cleansing attacks. It is the sequel to the 1993 film Sniper and the second installment in the Sniper film series.

== Plot ==
Former U.S. Marine Corps Force Reconnaissance Scout Sniper Thomas Beckett (Tom Berenger), who was discharged after his finger was amputated in the first film, is met by CIA officer James Eckles (Dan Butler) and Colonel Dan McKenna (Linden Ashby) at his home. Despite losing his index finger he uses to shoot, Beckett still has the capability of firing a gun. Considering this, along with his impressive career from his time in the Marine Corps, Beckett is given a mission to assassinate renegade Serbian General Mile Valstoria (Peter Linka), who is responsible for conducting hit-and-run ethnic cleansing operations in the Muslim-populated areas of Serbia. The CIA fears that Valstoria's actions are threatening to inflame a larger conflict in the region. Beckett agrees to participate, but requests that an additional man, a spotter, must come with him. Beckett is introduced to his spotter, Jake Cole (Bokeem Woodbine), an experienced U.S. Army sniper who is on death row for killing a federal officer who allegedly betrayed him. Cole is released and offered a pardon if he takes part in the mission.

After being dropped off into Serbia, Beckett and Cole make their way to a Catholic basilica. There, they meet an underground resistance member named Sophia (Erika Marozsán). Sophia takes them to her apartment, which is perched high above the designated area where Valstoria is due to show up, near a government building. The next morning, Beckett assassinates his target. Valstoria's killing puts the city into lockdown. After their original extraction point is compromised, Cole and Beckett are forced to find an alternative plan. When they hitch a ride on a public tram, nearby soldiers stop the vehicle and try to arrest them, but the two operatives take over the tram and ram it into some police cars. They soon exit the tram, running through the streets. Cole is captured and put into a prison where Valstoria's men keep their so-called 'special enemies', but Beckett is able to escape.

Beckett meets Sophia that night, and the two make a plan to rescue Cole. With the help of Sophia's brothers, Zoran and Vojislav (Ferenc Kovács and Barna Illyés), the next day they box in military trucks carrying Cole and a fellow prisoner to a prison where Cole was to be executed. They ambush the convoy and then help Cole and Pavel (Tamás Puskás), who is a pacifist and political dissident, out of the truck and into a van that Zoran brought. Cole admits to Beckett that the assassination of Valstoria was set up to get Cole caught and then rescue Pavel from jail and brought out of Serbia. That night, at an abandoned factory that was meant to be the designated extraction zone, the group is ambushed by a tank and infantry. Both Vojislav and Zoran are killed in the attack and, after escaping from the factory through a sewer, Beckett orders Sophia to break off from the group and leave.

A distance away from the factory, Pavel insists that they should head to Komra, a Muslim town where a friend of Pavel's, Nauzad (Zoltán Seress), lives. As the group meets Nauzad, he offers to help get the men to the border by getting them to a bus that would get them there. Within a couple of hours they are on their way but, as they cross a river, they come across an unexpected checkpoint and end up heading to Simand, the secondary extraction point, on foot. Meanwhile, Cpt. Marks (Can Togay) inspects the bus that the three men just departed from and suspects that they are attempting to head to Simand. Marks orders a tracker, (Béla Jáki), to take his special forces unit to Simand.

As the three men arrive at Simand, they are ambushed by the special forces team in a forest outside of town, and Pavel suffers a slight flesh wound in the arm. After the trio kills the entire team, they are forced to proceed into town. The tracker holes up in the town factory and snipes down the team. Beckett demands that Cole take Pavel to the extraction zone while he deals with the tracker. Cole is severely wounded by the sniper, but Beckett picks him off. Pavel and Becket carry the wounded Cole into the helicopter and leave, just as Serb reinforcements led by Cpt. Marks arrive. In the helicopter, Beckett and Pavel look at Cole as he is badly wounded. Cole says, "Freedom!" and succumbs to his wounds.

== Cast ==
- Tom Berenger as Master Gunnery Sergeant Thomas J. "Tom" Beckett
- Bokeem Woodbine as Jake Cole
- Tamás Puskás as Pavel
- Dan Butler as CIA Agent James Eckles
- Linden Ashby as Colonel Dan McKenna
- Erika Marozsán as Sophia
- Barna Illyés as Vojislav
- Ferenc Kovács as Zoran
- Dennis Hayden as Klete
- Can Togay as Captain Marks
- Peter Linka as General Mile Valstoria
- Akos Horvath as Serbian Lieutenant
- Béla Jáki as Serbian Scar Sniper
- László Áron as Serbian Shadow Figure
- Lukács Bicskey as Inmate
- Zoltán Seress as Nauzad
- Tas Szöllösi as Tony

== Reception ==
Scott Weinberg of eFilmCritic.com gave it 2.5 out of 5 and wrote: "A low-rent shoot-'em-up that may actually be worthy of a 3-dollar rental!"

The film has been criticised for technical flaws, for example: The Serbs depicted were speaking Hungarian rather than Serbian (as the actors playing the Serbs were all Hungarian and Cole spoke mostly gibberish instead of Hungarian).

== Sequel ==
A sequel titled Sniper 3, was released in 2004.
