= Bad Day on the Block =

- Film poster
- Directed by: Craig R. Baxley
- Written by: Betsy Giffen Nowrasteh
- Produced by: Chris Chesser; Alan Beattie
- Starring: Charlie Sheen; Mare Winningham; David Andrews; Noah Fleiss; John Ratzenberger
- Cinematography: David Connell
- Edited by: Sonny Baskin
- Music by: Gary Chang
- Distributed by: Largo Entertainment
- Release date: 1997
- Running time: 88 minutes
- Country: United States
- Language: English

Bad Day on the Block is a 1997 American psychological thriller film directed by Craig R. Baxley. It stars Charlie Sheen and Mare Winningham.

Although intended to be released in theaters, it was ultimately distributed direct-to-video. However, it was released in theaters in some regions under the title Under Pressure. The film initially premiered in Turkey. The film is sometimes also known as The Fireman.

== Plot ==
The film opens with a fire. Lyle Wilder (Charlie Sheen) is a decorated Los Angeles firefighter who saved an Afro-American baby's life in a crack house fire. He was honored for his bravery. However, Lyle Wilder is a psychopath, who had his wife, Marge and son, Kenny (Rory Flynn) leave him because of his violent tendencies. He believes that the neighbors (Mare Winningham and David Andrews) and their two children (Noah Fleiss and Chelsea Russo) are to blame for them leaving by manipulating his wife. Lyle began to hurt their children. Lyle also terrorizes Reese and Catherine Braverton. He does not excuse any accidents made by the Bravertons' two children, Zach and Chelsea. Lyle continues thinking that the Bravertons are his enemies. In flashbacks, it shows his violent tendencies, like playing Russian roulette with his wife and he being angry on his son's birthday (stemming from his own strict disciplinary upbringing). In another flashback, it is shown that Lyle left the mother of the baby to die in the fire because he considered her negligent.

Lyle still loves his wife and wants to ruin the Bravertons' life, because of their happiness. One day, the Bravertons' refrigerator malfunctions, and they call a repairman who gets the wrong address. The repairman, Ron, arrives at Lyle's house, who makes racist remarks (as Ron reminds him of a slum lord, whose negligence of a gas leak led to many fatalities). A slanging match ensues a fight, which ends with Ron's death; his mouth is superglued shut to silence his screams. During this time, the Bravertons report Lyle to the police for threatening them. Officers Al Calavito and Sandy Tierra respond to the call. Because of Lyle's decorated status, Calavito and Tierra doubt the Bravertons. When they go to see Lyle, Lyle tells them that the Bravertons are lying and that Reese beats Catherine. After Lyle breaks into the Bravertons' house again, Calavito and Tierra search Lyle's house. Tierra discovers the repairman's body while Lyle attacks and murders Calavito, by slamming a fireman's axe into his torso. Sandy overhears the struggle and goes to help Calavito, but she is also killed by having her neck broken (while Lyle rants disciplinary scripture). Later, Reese goes over to talk to Lyle, who savagely beats him. After tying him up, Lyle throws Reese through the Bravertons' kitchen window.

Lyle begins to play Russian roulette with the Bravertons, explaining how his late father taught him its history (along with numerous other disciplinary methods by which he abides) prior to his luck in roulette expiring. Zack stabs Lyle with a pocket knife, which only makes Lyle angrier. Catherine tries to talk to Lyle, pretending to be his ex-wife. While he is confused, Reese attacks Lyle from behind. After a brief fight, Lyle (distraught that he is being blamed for his actions) is shot by Catherine (branding him a coward). As he dies, Lyle stares at the engraving his wife inscribed on his watch (a sign of happier times). The film ends with the Bravertons spending some time as a family, trying not to notice a billboard displaying Lyle representing the Los Angeles Fire Department.

== Cast ==
- Charlie Sheen as Lyle Wilder
- Mare Winningham as Catherine Braverton
- David Andrews as Reese Braverton
- Noah Fleiss as Zach Braverton
- Chelsea Russo as Chelsea Braverton
- Dawnn Lewis as Officer Sandy Tierra
- John Ratzenberger as Officer Al Calavito
- Keone Young as Ron, The Repairman
- David Hewlett as Andrew
- Cody Jones as D.J.
- Karen Brigman as Marge Wilder
- Rory Flynn as Kenny Wilder
- Michelle Moffat as Angel
- David Sutcliffe as Helicopter Observer
- Catherine Swing as Crack House Reporter
- Reggie Jackson The Dog as himself
