= Sniper 3 =

- Official DVD cover
- Directed by: P.J. Pesce
- Written by: J.S. Cardone; Ross Helford
- Based on: Characters created by Michael Frost Beckner and Crash Leyland
- Produced by: Carol Kottenbrook; Scott Einbinder
- Starring: Tom Berenger; Byron Mann; Denis Arndt; John Doman
- Cinematography: Michael Bonvillain
- Edited by: Amanda I. Kirpaul
- Music by: Tim Jones
- Production companies: Sandstorm Films; Destination Films
- Distributed by: Columbia TriStar Home Entertainment
- Release date: September 28, 2004
- Running time: 90 minutes
- Country: United States
- Language: English

Sniper 3 is a 2004 American direct-to-video action film starring Tom Berenger, Byron Mann, Denis Arndt and John Doman. It was directed by P.J. Pesce, It is the sequel to the 2002 film Sniper 2 and is the third installment in the Sniper film series.

== Plot ==
Some time after the events of Sniper 2, Thomas Beckett is still adjusting to his return in the U.S. Marine Corps. His commanding officer, Captain Laraby thinks he is too old and bull-headed to still be active duty. Beckett attends the wedding of Neil Finnegan, the son of his best friend, Paul Finnegan, who served with him in Vietnam and saved his life before he was killed just before the fall of Saigon. Beckett reads a letter written given to him by Paul decades earlier just in case he did not make it to his son's wedding day. Beckett then dances with Paul's widow, Sydney, who later does an x-ray on Beckett's hand and informs him that when he lost his trigger finger, he suffered nerve damage which is causing his digitorum tendon to trigger involuntary jerks of his other fingers on his injured hand. She encourages Beckett to retire from the Marines for his health and hints that he should ask her on a date.

Beckett is later approached by two officials from the Central Intelligence Agency, Director William Avery and Deputy Director Richard Addis. Avery reveals to Beckett that Finnegan's death was faked in Vietnam and he is actually still alive. The CIA recruited him prior to the fall of Saigon and used him to run drugs out of Cambodia with the Khmer Rouge. However, Finnegan went insane and is now a drug and weapons trafficker known as the "King Cobra". He has amassed a large group of child soldiers and his group lives in the tunnels under the jungles of the Socialist Republic of Vietnam. Avery claims that Finnegan is the "head of the snake", and if he is killed, his child soldiers will have no leader and "the snake will die". Finnegan has been marked for elimination because he has even aided terrorism after providing support for Jemaah Islamiyah, and is about to be captured by the Vietnamese authorities which would cause an international incident. To spare Neil and Sydney from the painful truth, Beckett agrees to kill Finnegan, but demands that he conduct the mission alone, without a spotter, as he is unwilling to involve anyone else in such a personal mission.

In Ho Chi Minh City, Beckett meets his contact, NSA-recruited Vietnamese police operative Quan. Beckett is shaken due to the personal nature of his task and calls Sydney, forgetting the time difference. Beckett tells Sydney that he just wants her and Neil to know how much they mean to him, as he never truly had a family of his own. Later that night, Beckett goes to the Club Cong, to kill Finnegan, while he is having a drink. However, he fails to complete the mission and is shot at by a counter-sniper. Beckett kills the sniper but is arrested by Vietnamese authorities. In custody, Beckett sees Finnegan in another cell, who claims that he abandoned his wife and child because he felt "alive" in the jungle, but claims that he was "sold out" by the very people he worked for. Finnegan blows up the police station to escape, which gives Beckett an opportunity to escape as well. Beckett contacts Quan who demands that he provide him with a weapon and a way home. Suspicious of the purpose to his mission, Beckett wants to find Finnegan and get to the bottom of things. He locates Finnegan in "the ditch", old Viet Cong tunnels under Tây Ninh after he and Quan defend themselves from an ambush.

During the infiltration of the tunnels, Quan accidentally loses his footing and slips in front of Finnegan who holds him at gunpoint, but reveals the truth to Beckett. After he was recruited and began working for the CIA, Finnegan was in the ditch with John Gaylor, Bill Avery and a civilian AP photographer named Stevie York, who filmed their activities. York watched as the three men, high on drugs, killed nine unarmed civilians (six men and three women) over the course of three days. The men made York destroy the film, but, paranoid from the drugs, killed him and made it look like the NVA did it. Now that Gaylor is a Senator from Texas and is running for president, he cannot have Paul get captured and expose his past, so he asked Avery to trick Beckett into eliminating Finnegan, and then have another sniper kill Beckett to keep any information from getting out. Quan is forced to fight and kill one of Finnegan's top henchmen in hand to hand combat. In order to save Quan, Beckett kills Finn by shooting one of Paul's child soldiers in the hand and triggers an involuntary jerk of his other finger, resulting in Paul being shot in the head instead of Quan. With nothing left to fight for, Finnegan's militia surrenders and leaves. Afterwards, Quan and Beckett say their goodbyes and Quan arranges a retrieval for Beckett just over the border in Cambodia. Beckett is shaken and disillusioned by the experience, and on the way home he learns from a radio broadcast that Gaylor resigned his seat in the senate and ended his political career before he could become president, and Avery was found dead in an apparent suicide.

== Cast ==
- Tom Berenger as Master Gunnery Sergeant Thomas J. "Tom" Beckett
- Byron Mann as Detective Quan
- Denis Arndt as CIA Director Bill Avery
- John Doman as Paul "Finn" Finnegan / The King Cobra
- Troy Winbush as Captain Laraby
- Jeannetta Arnette as Sydney "Syd" Finnegan
- Ken Streutker as Neil Finnegan, Fin and Syd's son
- Zaki Rubenstein as Jocelyn Finnegan
- William Duffy as CIA Deputy Director Richard Addis
- Norman Veeratum as Captain Khan Choi
- Annop Varapanya as Captain Tok
- Dom Hetrakul as Chu
- Nophand Boonyai as Tran

== Sequel ==
A sequel titled Sniper: Reloaded, was released in 2011.
