= Dominic Mafham =

English actor (born 1968)

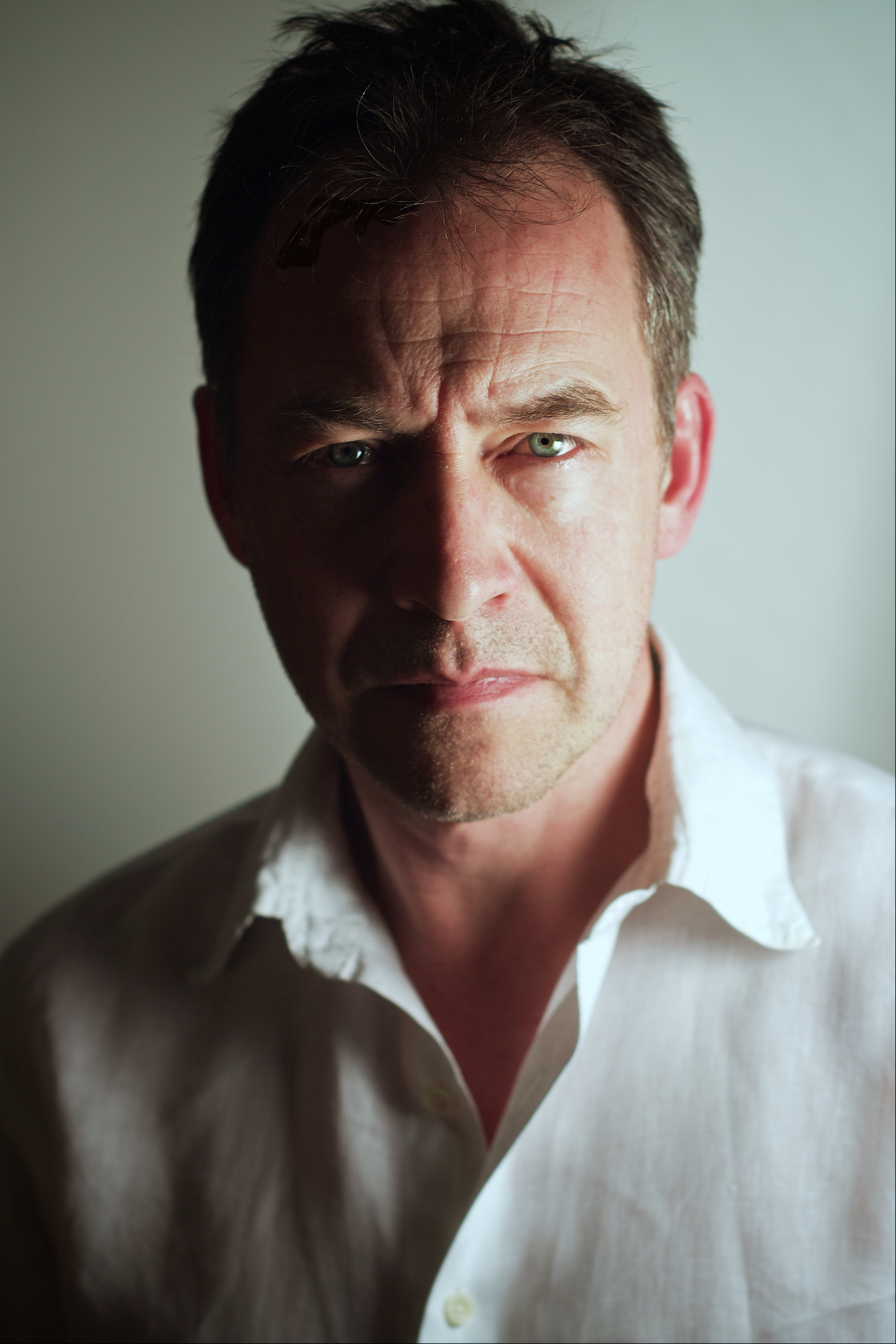
- Mafham in 2016
- Born: 11 March 1968 (age 58); Stafford, England
- Education: Bristol Old Vic Theatre School
- Occupation: Actor
- Years active: 1990–present
- Website: www.dominicmafham.com

Dominic Mafham (born 11 March 1968) is an English stage, film and television actor. He trained at the Bristol Old Vic Theatre School.

== Career ==
Dominic Mafham trained at the National Youth Theatre and then the Bristol Old Vic Theatre School.

Mafham began his career at The Royal Shakespeare Company in 1990. He was with the RSC for four years.

Mafham first came to prominence when he played Nigel Hawthorne's emotionally damaged son Daniel Pascoe in Paula Milne's The Fragile Heart. The drama was screened on Channel 4 in the UK in 1996. It won the 1997 BAFTA award for Nigel Hawthorne as Best Actor, and was nominated for several awards including Best Drama Serial. It was also nominated in the Royal Television Society awards that year.

Mafham played the central character—a high-tech assassin in the Swiss Alps stricken with a conscience—in Duncan Jones's first film Whistle. The film gathered a cult following after showing at various international film festivals, and finally gained a larger audience when it was included on the DVD of Jones's first full-length feature Moon.

Mafham played Mortimer Lightwood in the BBC's 1998 adaptation of Charles Dickens's Our Mutual Friend. Much of the story is seen from Mortimer's perspective. Our Mutual Friend was acclaimed worldwide, and won four BAFTAs including Best Serial. It was nominated for four more BAFTAs, as well as awards from the Royal Television Society, the Broadcasting Press Guild and the San Francisco International Film Festival. In 1999, he played Grahame Tranter in the Midsomer Murders episode "Death of a Stranger”.

Since then, Mafham has appeared in more than 80 productions, including the films The English Patient and Shooting Fish, and regular character Andrew Argyle in two seasons of the ITV medical drama Always and Everyone (A&E). He played the killer in the first episode of Foyle's War, Stephen Fry's errant brother Simon Kingdom in Kingdom, and Dr Richard Channing in the BBC World War Two drama Land Girls. He starred in the ITV comedy drama Up Rising as the upper-class hapless Justin Winterman. He also appeared in two episodes of Lewis. He starred in The Clinic playing lead character Dan Woodhouse. He appeared in Midsomer Murders for a second time in the episode “Not in My Backyard” as James Otley in 2011.

His more recent television appearances includes the opening episode of the second series of the BBC drama The Musketeers, playing General De Foix; an episode of the BBC series New Tricks, playing a Tory minister suspected of murder; and Humans on Channel 4 and AMC, as recurring character Chief Superintendent Shaw.

His more recent feature films include playing Dr Wangel in Heart of Lightness, a film directed by Jan Vardøen set in Arctic Norway based on Henrik Ibsen's play The Lady From The Sea. He played Sir Horsa in Dragonheart, Druid's Curse, the third in Universal Studios' Dragonheart series, directed by Colin Teague; and Guy 'Bullet Face' Bidwell in Sniper: Legacy, a Sony Pictures film with Tom Berenger and Dennis Haysbert, directed by Don Michael Paul. Mafham returned as Bidwell in Sniper: Ghost Shooter.

In 2013, he starred in the short film This is Vanity.

In February 2016 he appeared in the BBC TV series Father Brown as Sir Malcolm Braithwaite in episode 4.6, "The Rod of Asclepius".

Mafham appeared as Jerry Waldegrave, a guest lead, in the new HBO/BBC television series Strike based on J. K. Rowling's detective novels.

He played Polonius in Claire McCarthy's film Ophelia. The film stars Daisy Ridley, Naomi Watts, Clive Owen, George MacKay and Tom Felton.

Mafham appeared in season three of Killing Eve playing Charles Kruger, the accountant to The Twelve.

It was announced on 17 November 2021 that Mafham was filming Golda starring Helen Mirren. He played Haim Bar-Lev, the general responsible for the southern front in the Yom Kippur war of 1973.

In 2023, Mafham played Sir Ian Downing, an MI5 official, in the second series of BBC One drama Vigil, reprising his role in the third series in 2026.

== The Clinic ==
The Clinic is a primetime Sunday night drama for RTÉ in Ireland which ran for seven seasons from 2003 to 2009, regularly gathering an audience share of over 40%. The show was widely praised in the media. Mafham played the womanising, scheming and manipulative British plastic surgeon Dan Woodhouse. He appeared in every episode.

== Theatre and other work ==
From February 2011, Mafham played Osborne, to critical acclaim, in the 2011 National Tour of David Grindley's award-winning production of RC Sherriff's Journey's End. The production transferred to the Duke of York's Theatre in the West End in July 2011. Mafham received an award nomination for Best Supporting Actor

In spring 2015, Mafham played Antonio in The Merchant of Venice at Shakespeare's Globe Theatre. Jonathan Pryce played Shylock. The production was revived for a major tour in 2016, visiting New York, Washington and Chicago in the U.S. and several cities in China before returning to Shakespeare's Globe in October and culminating in a run in Venice at the Teatro Goldoni. The production received rave reviews.

In autumn 2017, Mafham appeared in King Lear (as Albany), at the Chichester Festival Theatre. Ian McKellen played Lear and featured Sinéad Cusack as a female Kent. The production transferred to the West End in 2018.

In October 2011, Mafham took part in the new Bush Theatre's inaugural event Sixty-Six Books, in a two-handed play by Jack Thorne based on the Book of Daniel. The play's title was James Oliver and he starred opposite Miranda Raison.

Mafham appeared as a celebrity chef in the television series The Restaurant. His menu earned four out of five stars.

In February 2010, Mafham guest-presented The Afternoon Show, RTÉ television's flagship daytime show.

Mafham has been the voice of the World Vision UK television campaign for several years, and is a widely used voice-over artist. He has recorded several books for Audible.

On 6 June 2014, Mafham took part in the BBC Radio 2 D Day 70th-anniversary concert at the Royal Albert Hall. The concert was broadcast live on Radio 2 and at over 150 cinemas across the UK. The event was presented by Dermot O'Leary, Jeremy Vine and Louise Minchin. Sir Patrick Stewart read Churchill.

Mafham appeared in the play Linda, written by Penelope Skinner and directed by Michael Longhurst, which opened on 26 November 2015 at the Royal Court Theatre in London. He played Neil, the husband of Linda, played by Noma Dumezweni who replaced Kim Cattrall after she left the production in the final week of rehearsals, citing "doctor's orders".

In September 2023, Mafham appeared in the first major revival of the Polly Stenham play That Face at the Orange Tree theatre, Richmond, London. The play's cast included Niamh Cusack, Ruby Stokes, and Kasper Hilton-Hille. The production received rave reviews.

He played Frank in Willy Russell's Educating Rita at the Curve Theatre, Leicester in autumn 2026.

== Radio ==
Mafham has appeared in several radio plays including the BBC Millennium Shakespeare production of Hamlet, playing Laertes. He played Ethan Frome in the BBC Radio 4 adaptation of Edith Wharton's novel of the same name; Hugh Cazalet in the mammoth serialisation of Elizabeth Jane Howard's wartime saga The Cazalets; the Duke of Buckingham in the dramatisations of The Stuarts, and most recently Geoffrey Marshall, a factory owner in Tyneside, in the Radio 4 series Home Front.

He has also contributed to the BBC Radio 3 programme Words and Music twice, most recently in August 2021 in the episode themed 'The Dance'.

== Doctor Who ==
Mafham appeared in the Big Finish audio Companion Chronicle adventure The Jigsaw War which was a two hander with Frazer Hines. He featured in the fourth Doctor adventures with Tom Baker, The Dalek Contract and The Final Phase, released in June and July 2013.

== Awards and nominations ==
- Irish Film & Television Awards (2009) nomination – Best Actor in a Leading Role, The Clinic
- BroadwayWorld UK Awards (2011) nomination – Best Actor in a Featured Role, Journey's End
