= Hollow Man =

2000 film by Paul Verhoeven

- Theatrical release poster
- Directed by: Paul Verhoeven
- Screenplay by: Andrew W. Marlowe
- Story by: Gary Scott Thompson; Andrew W. Marlowe
- Based on: The Invisible Man by H. G. Wells
- Produced by: Douglas Wick; Alan Marshall
- Starring: Elisabeth Shue; Kevin Bacon; Josh Brolin; Kim Dickens; Greg Grunberg; Joey Slotnick; Mary Randle; William Devane
- Cinematography: Jost Vacano
- Edited by: Mark Goldblatt
- Music by: Jerry Goldsmith
- Production companies: Columbia Pictures; Red Wagon Productions; Global Entertainment Productions GmbH & Company Medien KG
- Distributed by: Sony Pictures Releasing
- Release dates: August 4, 2000 (United States); October 12, 2000 (Germany)
- Running time: 112 minutes 119 minutes (director's cut)
- Countries: Germany; United States
- Language: English
- Budget: $95 million
- Box office: $190.2 million

Hollow Man is a 2000 science fiction horror film directed by Paul Verhoeven and written by Andrew W. Marlowe from a story he co-wrote with Gary Scott Thompson. Heavily inspired by H.G. Wells' classical 1897 novel The Invisible Man, the film stars Elisabeth Shue, Kevin Bacon, Josh Brolin, Kim Dickens, Greg Grunberg, Joey Slotnick, Mary Randle, and William Devane. It follows Sebastian Caine, a scientist who volunteers to test an experimental serum that renders him invisible. When the process cannot be reversed, he becomes increasingly unstable and violent.

Produced as a large-scale studio project with an emphasis on visual effects, the film was shot in 1999 on a budget of approximately $95 million, most of which was allocated to effects work by Sony Pictures Imageworks and Tippett Studio. Filming took place in California and the Washington, D.C. area, combining practical effects with digital compositing to depict invisibility, including motion-control photography and computer-generated imagery.

Released in the United States on August 4, 2000, Hollow Man debuted at number one at the box office and went on to gross about $190 million worldwide. The film received generally negative reviews from critics. However, its visual effects were well-received and earned a nomination for the Academy Award for Best Visual Effects at the 73rd Academy Awards.

A direct-to-video sequel, Hollow Man 2, starring Christian Slater and Peter Facinelli, was released in 2006.

== Plot ==
Brilliant but narcissistic scientist Sebastian Caine develops a serum for the military that renders a subject invisible. His team includes ex-girlfriend Linda McKay, Matt Kensington, Sarah Kennedy, Janice Walton, Carter Abbey, and Frank Chase. Sebastian finally devises a means to reverse the process, which they successfully test on an invisible gorilla. Sebastian also continues to pursue Linda romantically, unaware that she is now involved with Matt.

Rather than report his success, Sebastian lies to an oversight committee, including his mentor Howard Kramer, claiming he needs more time. Intending to make history as the first invisible man, he persuades Linda and Matt to proceed with unauthorized human testing while keeping the others uninformed. The procedure succeeds, and Sebastian becomes completely invisible. He is initially overjoyed at the success and begins using his condition to spy on and prank his colleagues, but eventually progresses to sexually assaulting a sleeping Sarah. The team grows concerned about his behavior. When the reversal procedure fails and nearly kills him, Sebastian is quarantined in the lab, and the team creates a latex mask for him to wear.

Sebastian becomes frustrated both by his situation and the constant testing he must undergo, leaving the facility and returning to his apartment. There, he resumes spying on an attractive neighbor. Realizing that no one could prove he was there, Sebastian sneaks into his neighbor's apartment and rapes her, before returning to the lab. Linda warns that if he leaves again, she and Matt will report the truth to the committee. Ignoring this, Sebastian rigs a device to loop a recording of his heat signature in his quarters, allowing him to leave undetected. He spies on Linda and Matt and becomes enraged upon seeing their relationship. Growing increasingly unstable, Sebastian later kills a dog used in the lab. The team discovers the looped recording and realizes Sebastian has been leaving the facility. Linda and Matt confess the unauthorized experiment to Kramer. After they leave, Sebastian, who has followed them, drowns Kramer in his pool.

The next day, Linda learns of Kramer's death just before Sebastian traps the team inside the lab by disabling the phones and elevator codes. He murders Janice, forcing the others into hiding while Matt and Carter search for him using tranquilizer guns and thermal goggles. Linda attempts to rationalize with Sebastian, who refuses to surrender the freedom and power his invisibility gives him. The team deduces that Sebastian intends to kill them all to conceal the fact that he has been made invisible. He kills Carter, Sarah, and Frank, wounds Matt, and locks him and Linda in a freezer. Linda uses a defibrillator to create an electromagnet and force the freezer door open, then constructs a flamethrower. Meanwhile, Sebastian rigs an improvised bomb using lab equipment.

As Sebastian attempts to escape via the elevator, Linda attacks him with the flamethrower, severely burning him. He survives and continues the attack. During the ensuing struggle, Matt strikes Sebastian with a crowbar. Though he recovers, Sebastian is thrown into a circuit box and electrocuted, incapacitating and rendering him partially visible.

Linda and Matt locate the bomb but cannot stop it. They climb the elevator shaft to escape just before the bomb explodes. Sebastian returns and pulls Linda onto the elevator roof before attacking her. He asks for a final kiss; during it, Linda disconnects the elevator cables, sending Sebastian falling to his death in the flames rapidly rising in the shaft. Linda and Matt escape the burning facility and are taken away by emergency responders.

== Cast ==
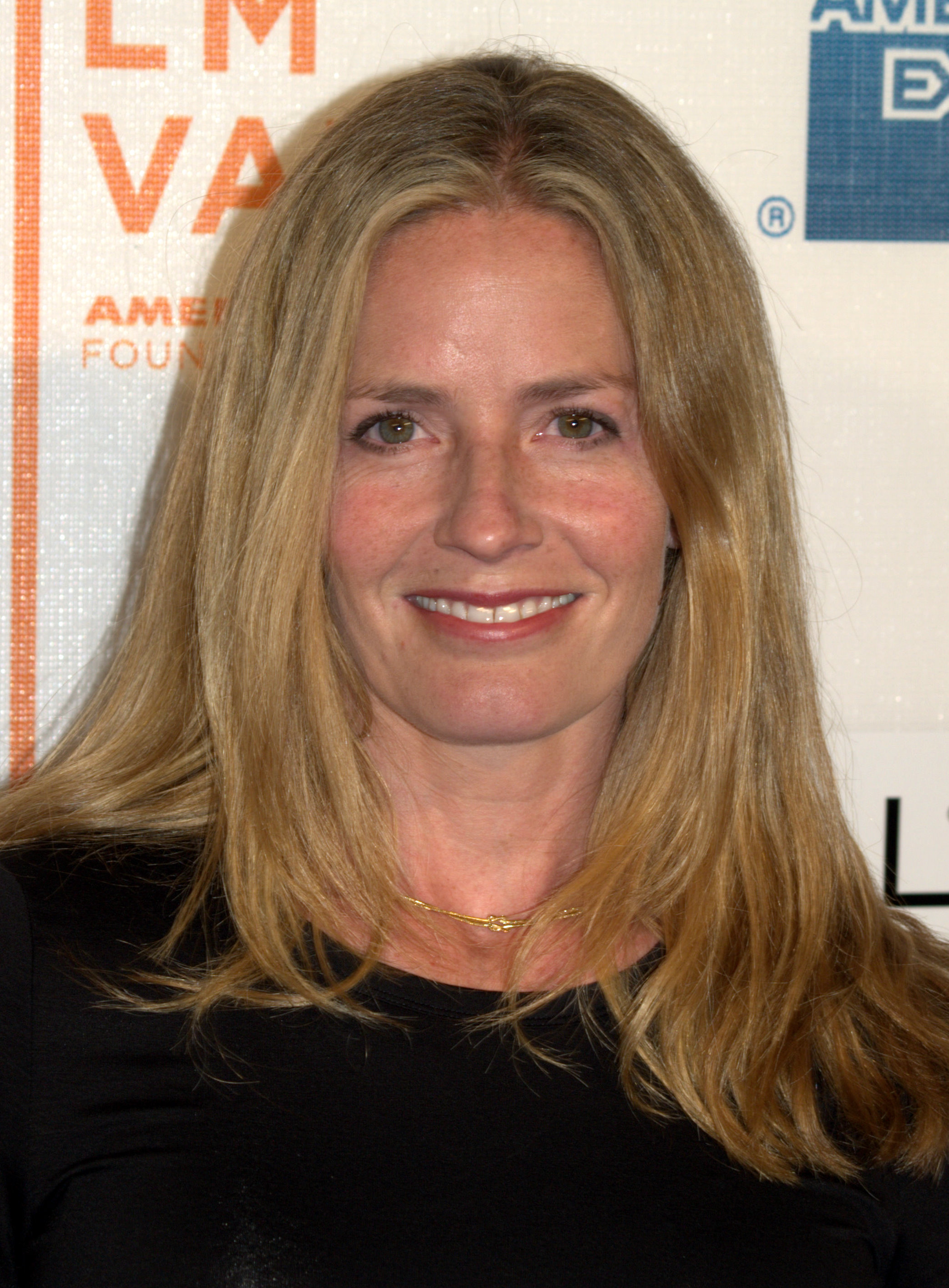
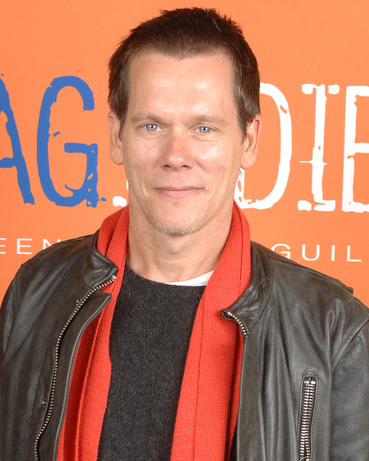
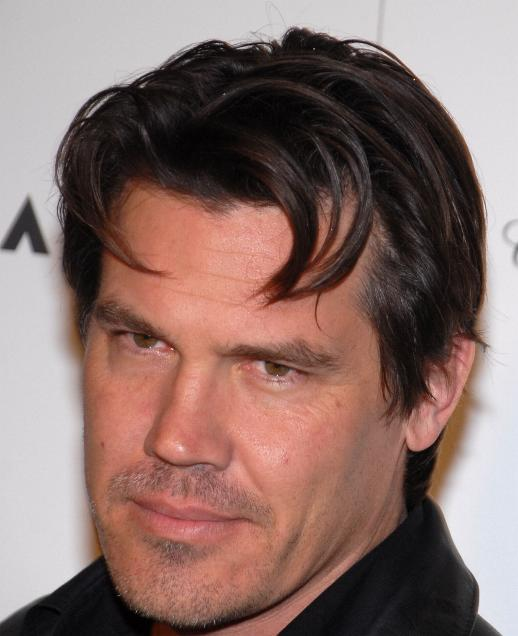
Elisabeth Shue (2009), Kevin Bacon (2007), and Josh Brolin (2007)
- Elisabeth Shue as Linda McKay, Sebastian's ex-girlfriend and co-worker who now has a relationship with Matt
- Kevin Bacon as Sebastian Caine, an ambitious molecular biologist who has developed a serum that can render the subject invisible
- Josh Brolin as Matthew Kensington, Linda's new boyfriend and co-worker to both her and Sebastian
- Kim Dickens as Sarah Kennedy, the feisty and rational veterinarian of the team
- Greg Grunberg as Carter Abbey, an emergency medical technician
- Joey Slotnick as Frank Chase, a laboratory technician
- Mary Randle as Janice Walton, a laboratory technician
- William Devane as Dr. Kramer, Sebastian's former mentor turned boss
- Rhona Mitra, Sebastian's attractive neighbor

== Production ==
=== Development ===
Following the multi-layered and controversial Starship Troopers (1997), Paul Verhoeven wanted to tone down the levels of sex and violence in his next film, aiming to make a more "conventionally commercial blockbuster". Approximately $50 million of the film's $95 million budget was reserved for visual effects work, which was primarily worked on by Sony Pictures Imageworks (SPI) and Tippett Studio. Of the 560 visual effects shots in the film, approximately two-thirds were worked on by SPI and the remaining third by Tippett Studio. Verhoeven also storyboarded most of the film, as he had done with all of his American films after experiencing trouble coordinating the action of Flesh+Blood (1985). He maintains that over 90% of the film is how he storyboarded it, as it was expensive (costing up to $300,000) if he decided to change a camera movement.

William Goldman says he was sent the script which he thought was "terrible... But I thought if the special effects worked, it could be a very, very exciting and different movie, and I’d never done special effects so I thought that could be interesting." He met with Verhoeven and realised the director liked the script but the studio wanted Goldman to rewrite it; the director said he would ignore anything Goldman did. "So, basically, I started rewriting for a director, knowing he wouldn’t like anything that I was rewriting," said Goldman in 2000. "I haven’t seen the movie, but I gather it sucks although the special effects are terrific. I’ll never know if it could have been saved."

=== Filming ===
The film was shot in chronological order, partially due to the fact that the laboratory set would be physically blown up near the end of the story, a sequence that was captured by 14 cameras at various angles. Principal photography began on April 16, 1999. Six weeks into filming, Elisabeth Shue tore her Achilles tendon, which shut down production on June 25 for over seven weeks. At one point, producers considered replacing her; however, shooting resumed on August 18, 1999, and ran until February 4, 2000, following her recovery.

Hollow Man was one of very few films allowed to shoot directly in front of The Pentagon building, with Verhoeven expressing surprise that the script was approved, because of the themes of the United States Government commissioning scientific experiments into making living beings invisible. Many of the location scenes were shot in and around Washington, D.C., with a restaurant set also being constructed in a building overlooking the U.S. Capitol. The laboratory scenes were shot at Sony Pictures Studios in Culver City, California; the elevator shaft used in the film's climax was built onto the side of the studio's parking garage.

A thermal imaging camera was employed for scenes showing "invisible" animals (most notably Isabelle the gorilla) or Sebastian following his transformation and the unsuccessful attempt to restore him to visibility; the same technique was used for characters when they look through thermal goggles. As Isabelle was played in part by a man in a gorilla suit, crew members had to stand by and warm the suit with hair dryers in order for the thermal camera to accurately emulate an actual gorilla's warmth.

Despite assumptions that Bacon would not be needed on set except when his character Sebastian is visible, Verhoeven and the crew realized after test footage was shot that he would need to be present to interact with the cast, as "the other actors were stranded in empty space, and the scenes looked stiff, inorganic and unconvincing" without him. Guy Pearce and Edward Norton were also considered for the role of Sebastian before Bacon was chosen, in part for his "ability to be both charming and diabolical". At the time of Hollow Man's release, Bacon recounted a "bad morning" on which, among other mishaps, he read a story in the press that suggested Robert Downey Jr. had been offered the film's title role.

=== Special effects ===
To achieve the effects of Sebastian being invisible, Bacon was digitally removed from the footage and each scene was shot twice: once with the actors and once without, for the background to be able to be seen through Sebastian's body. The crew used a motion-control camera, to ensure the same movements were achieved and the shots were then composited in post-production. For scenes where Sebastian was outlined in smoke, water and blood, Bacon wore a latex body suit, face mask, contact lenses and a dental plate all of one color; green was used for blood, blue for smoke, and black for water. Visual effects supervisor Craig Hayes then replaced Bacon with a digital clone to form an outline of his performance. To make the clone appear more like Bacon, information about "every aspect" of his body was recorded and the entirety of his body, including his genitals, was scanned into a computer. Their work earned Hayes and the effects team a nomination for the Academy Award for Best Visual Effects, which they lost to Gladiator.

"In Hollow Man we really tried to link the special effect shots with the actors as much as possible. That's why we were constantly sliding, panning and moving the camera, so the audience would feel that the actor was in the special effect shot or that the special effect shot was tied to the actor. We wanted coherence between the special effects and the actors so people would accept the effects as part of the actor's scene rather than as a special effect."
— Paul Verhoeven on the film's effects.

Inspired after his daughter bought him books on the subject of écorchés at La Specola in Florence, Verhoeven enlisted special effects supervisor Scott Anderson to create a three-dimensional digital model of the inside of Bacon's body, to create the "transformation scene" where Sebastian becomes invisible. New volume-rendering software was required just to replicate the inside of Bacon's body. The scene depicts Sebastian disappearing in stages; first, his skin, followed by his muscles, organs (including his lungs and heart) and finally, his skeleton. Bacon detailed the complications of his role in a diary he kept while filming and believed the "sense of isolation, anger and suffering" that he felt while wearing the mask and body suit helped his performance.

The scene of an invisible Sebastian raping a woman in a neighboring apartment was shot in two versions, with the second showing her screaming as she is raped. The first was used when preview audiences reacted with disdain, deeming it "painful" and feeling it alienated them from Sebastian too early. Although excising certain shots from the version he called "stronger[,] harsher and at the same time more relevant [for Sebastian Caine]", Verhoeven did not actually intend to show the rape, claiming "a woman being raped by an invisible man would look silly and that's the last thing we'd want to do. [...] It wouldn't express in any way the severity of the violence happening at that moment." Regardless, it was Verhoeven's first film he did not have to recut and resubmit to the Motion Picture Association of America (MPAA) in order to achieve an R rating.

== Themes ==
Professor of film and literature at California Polytechnic State University Douglas Keesey wrote in his illustrated book on the life and films of Verhoeven that the camera often adopts Sebastian's point of view, "tempting us to become voyeurs along with him, to get off on our ability to see without being seen". Elisabeth Shue categorized the film as a "story of the dark, seductive nature of evil" and also pointed out its voyeuristic qualities. Verhoeven commented: "Hollow Man leads you by the hand and takes you with Sebastian into teasing behaviour, naughty behaviour and then really bad and ultimately evil behaviour. At what point do you abandon him? I'm thinking when he rapes the woman would probably be the moment that people decide, 'This is not exactly my type of hero', though I must say a lot of viewers follow him further than you would expect."

== Music ==
Hollow Man (Original Motion Picture Soundtrack)

Soundtrack album by Jerry Goldsmith
- Released: July 25, 2000
- Recorded: September 1999-June 2000
- Studios: Abbey Road Studios, London
- Genre: Orchestral film score
- Length: 51:22
- Label: Varèse Sarabande
- Producers: Jerry Goldsmith, Paul Verhoeven

Jerry Goldsmith soundtrack chronology
The 13th Warrior (1999)	Hollow Man (Original Motion Picture Soundtrack) (2000)	Along Came a Spider (2001)

The soundtrack for Hollow Man was composed by Jerry Goldsmith, his third collaboration with Verhoeven after Total Recall (1990) and Basic Instinct (1992). Varèse Sarabande released it on CD on July 25, 2000.

Filmtracks.com found there to be two distinct motifs: the "transitional motif" of "bass thumping and [an] array of prickling electronic effects that slowly increase their pace and volume as the scenes [of invisibility] progress", heard in "Isabelle Comes Back" and "This Is Science"; and the "rambling piano and bass-element ostinato heard for the violent chasing" in both "The Elevator" and "The Big Climb". The site pointed out "the pulsating piano, woodwind, and electronic rhythm from [Basic Instinct] underneath a meandering, disembodied theme for high strings not much unlike [The Haunting]", and judged that the "action bursts, especially with the drum pad and synthesizer combos" were akin to Goldsmith's use of those elements in Total Recall. Overall, the site felt the score was "over the top", calling it "pieced together from other Goldsmith scores" and derivative while citing the first and second tracks as highlights.

== Release ==
Despite a negative response from critics, Hollow Man debuted at #1 ahead of Nutty Professor II: The Klumps, Space Cowboys and Coyote Ugly with $26.4 million in its opening weekend. During that time, the film achieved the second-highest August opening weekend, behind The Sixth Sense (1999). The film also generated the highest opening weekends of Kevin Bacon and Paul Verhoeven's careers, beating both Apollo 13 (1995) and Total Recall (1990) respectively. It was the first film since Mission: Impossible 2 to top the box office for multiple weeks. After fifteen weeks of release, Hollow Man had grossed in excess of $73.2 million in North America and just over $117 million elsewhere, making a total of $190.2 million worldwide, against its $95 million production budget. It was Verhoeven's biggest hit since Basic Instinct (1992).

In the United Kingdom, the film made $2.4 million in its opening weekend, ranking in first place, beating out Billy Elliot and Me, Myself & Irene.

== Reception ==
=== Critical response ===
The film received generally negative reviews from critics. On the review aggregator website Rotten Tomatoes, 25% of 118 critics' reviews are positive, with an average rating of 4.9/10. The website's consensus reads: "Despite awesome special effects, Hollow Man falls short of other films directed by Paul Verhoeven. This flick over time degenerates into a typical horror film." Metacritic, which uses a weighted average, assigned the film a score of 24 out of 100, based on 35 critics, indicating "generally unfavorable" reviews.

While some critics criticized the plot and acting, with some claiming it contains hallmarks of slasher films and misogynistic undertones, most critics praised the visual effects employed in making Kevin Bacon appear to be invisible, which earned the film a nomination for Best Visual Effects at the 2001 Academy Awards.

Roger Ebert of the Chicago Sun-Times gave the film two stars out of four, and complained that Verhoeven wasted potential by taking an invisible man and doing nothing more than having him go berserk. While ultimately feeling that the film is merely a slasher film with a science gimmick, Ebert praised the special effects, calling them "intriguing" and "astonishing", but felt the film lacked the "imagination and wit" of Verhoeven's best films.

The film received three nominations at the 2000 Stinkers Bad Movie Awards: Worst On-Screen Group (the scientists), Worst Screenplay for a Film That Grossed over $100 Million Using Hollywood Math and Most Unintentionally Funny Movie, but lost to Battlefield Earth and Gone in 60 Seconds, respectively. The film was also nominated for both Best Science Fiction Film and Best Music at the Saturn Awards and won Best Special Effects.

A fake review attributed to David Manning was revealed in late 2001 as a hoax, created by Sony to fake publicity for the film.

=== Director's response ===
Verhoeven was not happy with the movie. In 2013, he told The Hollywood Reporter:

I decided after Hollow Man, this is a movie, the first movie that I made that I thought I should not have made. It made money and this and that, but it really is not me anymore. I think many other people could have done that. I don't think many people could have made RoboCop that way, or either Starship Troopers. But Hollow Man, I thought there might have been 20 directors in Hollywood who could have done that. I felt depressed with myself after 2002.

He reiterated his statement in 2014: "It is very boring. I felt that I failed to transform it. What I had made was an on-demand studio movie. I decided I did not want to do that again." Speaking with The Playlist in 2016, he called Hollow Man "probably the worst film I've ever done."

As of 2026, Hollow Man is Verhoeven's final film produced by a major American production company.

== Home media ==
Hollow Man was released on DVD and VHS in North America by Columbia TriStar Home Entertainment on January 2, 2001. It was released with its widescreen theatrical aspect ratio of 1.85:1 and included various special features, including two audio commentaries—one with Verhoeven, writer Andrew W. Marlowe and Kevin Bacon, and another with composer Jerry Goldsmith and the isolated score of the film; the HBO making-of featurette "Hollow Man: Anatomy of a Thriller"; 15 mini-featurettes on the making of the film, several detailing storyboards of progress shots with commentary; three deleted scenes with commentary by Verhoeven; visual effects picture-in-picture comparisons of the raw footage with the final scene; cast and crew biographies; a teaser and a theatrical trailer. In the years that followed, both a deluxe Superbit edition was made, as well as a director's cut of the film, which restored nearly seven minutes of footage—primarily extended cuts of existing scenes including Linda and Matthew in bed, the rape scene, Sebastian killing the dog and the aftermath of Sarah being suspicious of Sebastian.

The director's cut version of the film was released on Blu-ray October 16, 2007 in 1080p. Although lacking any commentaries, it restores most other special features. A two-disc double pack including the stand-alone sequel Hollow Man 2 was released on DVD in 2006 while Mill Creek Entertainment released the Blu-ray version on March 26, 2013. Mill Creek also released the director's cut in their Dark Passengers 8 movie DVD collection on October 1, 2013, 24 Horror DVD collection on March 7, 2017, and The 6 Degrees Blu-ray collection on April 3, 2018. On July 8, 2019, both films were released on Blu-ray Collector's Edition by 88 Films, including the theatrical cut of the first film.
