= Kingdom Hospital =

2004 US TV series developed by Stephen King

- Genre: Horror; Mystery fiction; Medical drama
- Based on: The Kingdom by Lars von Trier; Tómas Gislason; Niels Vørsel
- Developed by: Stephen King
- Directed by: Craig R. Baxley
- Starring: Andrew McCarthy; Bruce Davison; Meagen Fay; Jack Coleman; Diane Ladd; Jodelle Micah Ferland; Ed Begley Jr.; Jamie Harrold; Sherry Miller; Allison Hossack; William Wise; Julian Richings
- Theme music composer: Ivy
- Opening theme: "Worry About You"
- Composer: Gary Chang
- Country of origin: United States
- Original language: English
- No. of seasons: 1
- No. of episodes: 13

Production
- Executive producers: Stephen King; Mark Carliner; Lars von Trier
- Producers: Robert F. Phillips; Lisa Henson; Janet Yang; Thomas H. Brodek; Richard Dooling
- Production locations: Vancouver, British Columbia, Canada
- Cinematography: David Connell
- Running time: 40 minutes
- Production companies: Hospital Productions; Mark Carliner Productions; Touchstone Television; Sony Pictures Television

Original release
- Network: ABC
- Release: March 3 – July 15, 2004

Related
- The Kingdom

Kingdom Hospital (sometimes known as Stephen King's Kingdom Hospital) is a thirteen-episode television series based on Lars von Trier's The Kingdom, developed by horror writer Stephen King in 2004 for American television. While initially conceived as a miniseries, it was later changed into a regular television series (albeit one that lasted one season). It was first aired on ABC on March 3 and concluded on July 15, 2004 after being put on hold during NBA playoffs.

Kingdom Hospital has been compared to the paranormal hospital drama series All Souls, another production which had been inspired by Von Trier's The Kingdom.

== Plot ==
The story tells of the fictional Kingdom Hospital located in Lewiston, Maine, built on the site of a mill that manufactured military uniforms during the American Civil War. Previously, a hospital known as the "Old Kingdom" had been built on the site, but it burned down. The current hospital is known as the "New Kingdom". The hospital's "turbulent" nature seems to reflect its ominous logo, a crimson stylized dagger, predicting what will come.

A psychic named Mrs. Druse has checked into the hospital numerous times and is taken by the staff to be a hypochondriac. She asks for the assistance of the cynical yet compassionate Dr. Hook to uncover the truth about the hospital and the mysterious spirits who haunt it – including a sinister teenage boy, a young girl who had died in the fire that burned the mill down, and a strange animal that follows and protects the young girl, who calls it Antubis (it is similar to a giant anteater, but whose long snout opens up to a set of jagged teeth).

Elsewhere, Peter Rickman, a painter who is admitted to the hospital following a road accident (with severe injuries to his skull and spine) begins to discover the ghastly goings-on while he lies comatose in room 426.

Other subplots included the initiation of arrogant chief of surgery Dr. Stegman into the secret society known as the 'Keepers', and the challenged-at-every-turn flirtation between young Dr. Elmer Traff and sleep doctor Dr. Lona Massingale.

== Cast ==
=== The hospital staff ===
- Andrew McCarthy as Dr. Hook, a surgeon and a member of the Keepers.
- Bruce Davison as Dr. Stegman, a neurosurgeon who is on the verge of being initiated into the Keepers, and is facing a malpractice suit.
- Meagen Fay as Dr. Brenda Abelson, Dr. Stegman friend and love interest.
- Ed Begley Jr. as Dr. Jesse James, Kingdom Hospital's Chief of Staff and member of the Keepers, who spends his time initiating "Operation: Morning Air".
- Jamie Harrold as Dr. Elmer Traff, a young surgeon and son of Dr. Louis Traff. He is smitten with Dr. Massingale and pursues her romantically.
- Sherry Miller as Dr. Lona Massingale, the enigmatic sleep doctor, and love interest of Dr. Traff.
- Allison Hossack as Dr. Christine Draper and a love interest of Dr. Hook.
- William Wise as Dr. Louis Traff, the leader of the Keepers, and the longest serving member of the hospital.
- Lena Georgas as Nurse Carrie von Trier.
- Brandon Bauer as Abel Lyon, an orderly with Down syndrome. Both he and Christa have an uncanny knack of knowing all the hospital's goings-on, including those of the otherworld.
- Jennifer Cunningham as Christa Mendelson, Abel's partner-in-crime, who also has Down syndrome.
- Julian Richings as Otto, a security guard. Otto often accompanied by Blondi, an intelligent German Shepherd Dog. Blondi has on several occasions shown self-consciousness and actual thought capabilities; as an in-joke, he thinks in a German accent. Blondi's name is a reference to Adolf Hitler's favorite German Shepherd Dog, also named Blondi.
- Del Pentecost as Bobby Druse, Mrs. Druse's son, and an orderly at the hospital.

=== Patients, past and present ===
- Diane Ladd as Sally Druse, a professed psychic, who regularly checks into Kingdom Hospital for all sorts of complaints, and who is determined to discover the truth lurking in the hospital's depths.
- Jack Coleman as Peter Rickman, a comatose painter who is discovering the past and future of Kingdom Hospital. He has latent psychic abilities that are triggered after his near death experience and proceed to develop through the season allowing him to perceive ghosts and travel between the human and spirit world.
- Suki Kaiser as Natalie Rickman, Peter's wife, determined not to believe in the phenomena plaguing Kingdom Hospital.
- Jodelle Micah Ferland as Mary Jensen, the ghost of a girl murdered to cover up the arson of the mill in the 1860s; she is a symbol of death in Kingdom Hospital.
- Kett Turton as Paul Morlock, Dr. Gottreich's young assistant, who haunts the hospital as a figure of evil.

=== Recurring cast ===
- Ron Selmour as the firecracker man
- Zak Santiago as Dr. Sonny Gupta
- Beverley Elliott as Nurse Brick Bannerman
- Christopher Heyerdahl as Reverend Jimmy Criss, a "miracle worker"
- Antony Holland as Lenny Stillmach, an elderly patient
- Michael Lerner as Sheldon Fleischer, a scheming attorney
- Bill Meilen as Dr. Gottreich, a ghostly torture expert
- Claudette Mink as Celeste Daldry, a reporter for Channel 9
- Ty Olsson as Danny, an EMT
- Gerard Plunkett as Dr. Richard Shwartzon, a seismologist
- Paul Perri as Frank Schweigen, a vagrant who falls victim to Steg's incompetence and Elmer's pranks
- Benjamin Ratner as Ollie, Danny's fellow EMT
- Ryan Robbins as Dave Hoonan, Peter's hit and run driver
- Alan Scarfe as Dr. Henry Havens
- Jim Shield as Rolf Pedersen, a convict in the hospital
- Emily Tennant as Mona Klingerman, a young girl with irreparable brain damage due to Steg's incompetence
- Janet Wright as Nurse Liz Hinton
- Kett Turton as Antubis, the giant anteater-like companion of the ghost of Mary Jensen. Near the end of the season, he reveals his true name is Anubis, but accepts Mary's mispronunciation of his name without any problems.

=== Guest stars ===
Charles Martin Smith, Wayne Newton, Lorena Gale (Battlestar Galactica), Bruce Harwood (The Lone Gunmen), Evangeline Lilly (Lost), Tygh Runyan (The L Word), Peter Wingfield (Highlander: The Series), Callum Keith Rennie (Due South), Christine Willes (Dead Like Me), William B. Davis (The X-Files), and Stephen King ("writer") all have guest appearances.

== Production ==
King and producer Mark Carliner discovered the source material, the five-hour Danish television movie called Riget (Kingdom in English), while searching through a video store during the making of the 1997 TV miniseries adaptation of King's novel The Shining. They tried to buy the rights to the Danish original, only to learn that Columbia Pictures had acquired them and intended to make a theatrical movie. After five years, Columbia concluded the work could not be adapted in two-hour form and sold the rights in exchange for the rights to King's novella "Secret Window, Secret Garden" from the 1990 book Four Past Midnight.

This was the first time he had adapted someone else's work rather than his own from scratch. King kept most of the characters and dark humor in place, but added a new central character named Peter Rickman who was based on his own personal experience after being hit by a minivan. King described the finished product as "the thing I like best out of all the things I've done." The series is known for its tangential plots and characters who recur throughout, as King called it a "novelization for television". King committed to write the story line for the following year, should ABC decide to continue the series.

While written as a miniseries, many fans wanted it to be renewed for a second season, and Stephen King had a storyboard written out for one. After incredibly successful ratings for the first episode, the highest rating drama debut of the year on ABC, ratings plummeted thereafter. Despite being cancelled, the series did receive Emmy Award nominations for Special Visual Effects for a Series and Main Title Design.

== Episodes ==
No.	Title	Directed by	Written by	Original release date	US viewers (millions)
1	"Thy Kingdom Come"	Craig R. Baxley	Stephen King	March 3, 2004	14.04.
Date: October 22, 2003; Peter Rickman is admitted to hospital and, while in surgery, begins to discover Kingdom Hospital is more than it seems; Dr. Stegman asks vacuous Chief of Staff Dr. James to help him rid the hospital of hypochondriac Mrs. Druse; and earthquakes hit Kingdom.
2	"Death's Kingdom"	Craig R. Baxley	Stephen King	March 10, 2004	8.5
Date: October 22, 2003; Peter's hit-and-run driver arrives at Kingdom, becoming one of the first to witness the strange events building there; Elmer attempts to attract Lona during a dinner in the morgue; and Hook schemes to keep Mrs. Druse on for observational purposes.
3	"Goodbye Kiss"	Craig R. Baxley	Stephen King	March 17, 2004	7.1
Date: October 22, 2003; Dr. Hook becomes drawn into Mrs. Druse's plight after seeing the ghost of Mary; a prisoner and his girlfriend plan a suicide pact gone wrong when the prisoner is saved by the staff; Dr. Stegman is accused of malpractice again; and Peter is visited by the spirits of Kingdom in the form of Mary and Paul.
4	"The West Side of Midnight"	Craig R. Baxley	Stephen King	March 24, 2004	5.4
Date: October 23, 2003; Dr. Traff's ex-wife dies on the operating table; Elmer dreams of Antubis; the deceased Lenny helps Mrs. Druse in her quest; Stegman goes crazy after finding his car defaced and decides to find the culprits; Paul uses Pedersen to get rid of Mrs. Druse. Kingdom suffers a second earthquake. Note: also known as West of Midnight; Christine Willes guest stars.
5	"Hook's Kingdom"	Craig R. Baxley	Stephen King & Richard Dooling	March 31, 2004	5.1
Date: October 23, 2003; Paul and Antubis face off; Pedersen plots to kill his roommate; Dr. Gupta is stunned by the likeness of a dead patient to Elmer; Elmer and Lona flirt in the sleep lab; Dr. Hook shows Draper his home in the bowels of the Kingdom; Mary reaches out to Peter; Abel and Christa ask a favor of Dr. James; and the believers gather in "Hook's Kingdom".
6	"The Young and the Headless"	Craig R. Baxley	Richard Dooling	April 8, 2004	3.7
Date: October 23, 2003; Dr. James holds a dinner to get funding for an investigative project into the earthquakes, which involves the accidental destruction of a recovering alcoholic seismologist; Steg's initiation goes ahead, while Brenda destroys documents incriminating him; Peter, Paul, Mary, Antubis and the headless victim wander the bowels of the hospital and Elmer uses a corpse to play a trick on Lona, but it goes wrong.
7	"Black Noise"	Craig R. Baxley	Richard Dooling	April 15, 2004	3.5
Date: October 24, 2003; Elmer is suspected of desecrating the corpse, while its headless body wanders the corridors below Kingdom; Hook's new patient is a self-serving attorney who finds himself sharing a room with the badly-burnt Rolf Pederson; Peter's new roommate. Meanwhile, a seismologist is brought in to study the earthquakes, and his paranoid thoughts on the hospital make him the perfect partner to help Mrs. Druse and Natalie save Mary; Druse asks Bobby to help her gain access to medical records; and Dr. James holds a meeting for all staff in which he attempts to ascertain if Kingdom is haunted – an idea Steg is heavily against.
8	"Heartless"	Craig R. Baxley	Richard Dooling	April 22, 2004	3.8
Date: October 25, 2003; Fleischer schemes to get himself moved up the transplant list, by making a deadly deal with Antubis; Natalie and Mrs. Druse discover more secrets about Mary and the Gates Mill Fire of 1869; Hook uses the missing head to gain Elmer's help in bringing down Steg; Steg's day goes from bad to worse as he begins losing his sanity; Massingale and Elmer experience a bizarre dream experience; Hook learns of the 1869 and 1939 fires on the site of Kingdom; and Draper and Mrs. Druse suffer at the hands of Steg, the former losing credit on a story in a medical journal, the latter being confined to her bed.
9	"Butterfingers"	Craig R. Baxley	Stephen King	April 29, 2004	2.6
Date: October 26, 2003; The day of the World Series final brings excitement to everyone at Kingdom, except Steg, but a suicide attempt by disgraced former New England Robins player Earl "Error" Candleton sees tension building amongst the staff, and it is up to Peter and Mary to save Candleton from Paul, and an untimely death.
10	"The Passion of Reverend Jimmy"	Craig R. Baxley	Tabitha King & Stephen King	June 24, 2004	3.0
Date: October 27–29, 2003; Reverend Jimmy is crucified in a back alley, and his body becomes the source of a series of miracles which profoundly affect Nurse Wright. As the miracles grow, thousands converge upon Kingdom Hospital, waiting for the anticipated resurrection of the Reverend. Elsewhere, Massingale, Havens and Otto are trapped in the morgue after an earthquake; Dr. Schwartzon predicts the future; Steg entices Brenda to destroy incriminating evidence against him, while Hook schemes to get that evidence back with Elmer's "help"; and Natalie and Mrs. Druse continue to learn more of Mary's death. Note: also known as On the Third Day.
11	"Seizure Day"	Craig R. Baxley	Richard Dooling	July 1, 2004	2.6
Date: October 29–31, 2003; A mounted policeman patrols near the hospital and gets knocked down by a blinding light, and is brought to the hospital where he convulses and has seizures. Dr. Hook sees a pattern of the people revolving around the hospital who experienced the same thing. Bobby Druse is sent by Sally to retrieve old hospital files about Mary, Elmer is sent by Hook to retrieve a file related to the Mona Klingerman case and Brenda is sent by Stegman to retrieve the same Klingerman document. Stegman hallucinates during an operation on a patient's brain; he sees the disease that Antubis "eats". While Steg meets with lawyers in the Klingerman case, Lona investigates Elmer's strange dreams, and Hook and Draper get closer together.
12	"Shoulda Stood in Bed"	Craig R. Baxley	Stephen King	July 8, 2004	2.4
Date: November 1, 2003; Dr. James continues work on his "Operation: Morning Air" badges; Elmer gets his head back; Hook publicly shames Steg in the Mona Klingerman case, leading to Steg's suspension as a surgeon; and – as he rejects Brenda – she gets revenge on him; Antubis shows Peter and Mrs. Druse a possible future; Paul convinces Steg to end it all; and Peter brings everyone together to hold a séance, before it is too late.
13	"Finale"	Craig R. Baxley	Stephen King	July 15, 2004	3.7
Date: November 1, 2003; On All Souls' Day, with only hours until the destruction of Kingdom Hospital, the doctors, patients and staff of Kingdom come together to hold a séance where they learn the truth about the Gates Falls Mill fire, and Mary's death, and must make one last attempt to set things right; while an insane Steg wanders the halls searching for them, certain that they brought about his destruction.

== Reception ==
The show received mixed reviews from critics. The New York Times review argued that the "plot unfolds disjointedly and without enough suspense." CNN felt the premiere was promising and the "jittery pacing and oddball sensibility" were reminiscent of Twin Peaks. The USA Today review stated that the show "does have a few frightening moments, but they don't compensate for the lackluster performances, the absence of character development, humor or pacing, or the wild fluctuations in tone."

The review aggregation website Rotten Tomatoes gave the series a 46% approval rating based on 26 reviews, with an average rating of 5.90/10. The site's critical consensus reads: "Stephen King may bring autobiographical flourishes to this remake of a Danish series, but the self-indulgent Kingdom Hospital lacks the horror maestro's penchant for good scares."

== Music ==
Song	Performer	Episode	Context
"Worry About You"	Ivy	All episodes	Theme music, and heard throughout episodes.
"Red Dragon Tattoo"	Fountains of Wayne	"Thy Kingdom Come" (and others)	First heard while Peter is jogging.
"I'll Be Seeing You"	Frank Sinatra	"Thy Kingdom Come"	Heard when the wife receives the news of the accident.
"Wee Wee Hours"	Chuck Berry	"The West Side of Midnight"	Heard at the start of the episode.
"Where's Your Head At"	Basement Jaxx	"The Young and the Headless"	Played as the headless body searches for his head.
"Take Me Out to the Ball Game"	Unknown Artist **	"Butterfingers"	Sung by many characters, including Paul. ** The song was written by Jack Norworth in 1908.
"Na Na Hey Hey Kiss Him Goodbye"	Steam	"Goodbye Kiss"	Sung while operating on a suicidal prisoner.
"Gin and Juice"	The Gourds	"Thy Kingdom Come"	Heard while Dr. Stegman is driving to the hospital and the people outside of the mission are taunting him while he parks.
"I Don't Know Why I Love You"	Ivy	"Hook's Kingdom"	Played while Drs. Hook and Draper talk in Hook's bedroom.
"Time Has Come Today"	The Chambers Brothers	"Finale"	Sung during the beginning of the finale.

== Distribution ==
=== Broadcasters ===
- Australia: Seven Network / Prime Television / Sci Fi Channel (Australia)
- Argentina: SyFy Channel / Space
- Belgium: VT4
- Bolivia: Red ATB/Red PAT (2015)
- Brazil: AXN
- Canada: ABC
- Chile: RED TV
- Denmark: TV3
- Finland: Nelonen
- France: M6
- Germany: Kabel 1
- Greece: Mega Channel
- Hong Kong: TVB Pearl
- Hungary: AXN Sci Fi / RTL Klub
- Honduras: SyFy Channel/AXN
- Italy: Italia 1
- Poland: TVP2 / AXN

=== Home video ===
Columbia TriStar Home Entertainment released the entire series on DVD. The DVD includes four short featurettes that cover the making of the miniseries:

- Patients and Doctors: The Cast of Kingdom Hospital is a segment running approximately 14 minutes that takes a look at the 'whys' and 'wherefores' of the casting decisions.
- Inside The Walls: The Making of Kingdom Hospital is a segment running a quarter of an hour that gives us a look at the thought process behind getting the actual miniseries made from its origins as Von Trier's original Danish production through King's 're-imagining' of that work.
- Designing Kingdom Hospital: A Tour is a seven-minute piece on the set design.
- The Magic of Antubis is an eight-minute look at the creation of the anteater with thoughts from the director and the chief effects supervisor.

In addition to the four featurettes, there is also a commentary track on the first episode with King, director Craig Baxley, producer Mark Carliner and visual effects supervisor James Tichenor.
