= Sniper: Ultimate Kill =

2017 U.S. action film

- Official DVD cover
- Directed by: Claudio Fäh
- Written by: Chris Hauty
- Based on: Characters created by Michael Frost Beckner; Crash Leyland
- Produced by: David Zelon
- Starring: Chad Michael Collins; Danay García; Billy Zane; Tom Berenger
- Cinematography: Ross W. Clarkson
- Edited by: Adam Recht
- Music by: Frederik Wiedmann
- Production companies: Destination Films; Mandalay Pictures
- Distributed by: Sony Pictures Home Entertainment
- Release date: October 3, 2017
- Running time: 94 minutes
- Country: United States
- Language: English

Sniper: Ultimate Kill is a 2017 American action film directed by Claudio Fäh and starring Chad Michael Collins, Billy Zane, and Tom Berenger. The film is the seventh installment of the Sniper film series and a sequel Sniper: Ghost Shooter (2016), and the first to feature both Berenger and Zane since the original movie. It was released direct-to-video on October 3, 2017.

== Plot ==
Colombian drug kingpin Jesús Morales hires a skilled sniper known as "El Diablo" to eliminate all of his enemies, enabling him to gain more control over routes for smuggling drugs into the United States. Kate Estrada, a DEA agent, was sent to Colombia with Master Sergeant Brandon Beckett to stop "El Diablo" and extradite Morales.

== Cast ==
- Chad Michael Collins as Master Sergeant Brandon Beckett
- Billy Zane as Major Richard Miller
- Tom Berenger as Master Gunnery Sergeant Thomas J. "Tom" Beckett
- Joe Lando as Agent John Samson
- Danay García as Kate Estrada
- Mike Straub as Maines
- Jaime Correa as Father Garcia
- Luis Alfredo Velazco as Captain Garza
- Andrés Felipe Calero as El Diablo
- Juan Sebastián Calero as Jésus Morales
- Diana Hoyos as Maria Ramos

== Sequel ==
A sequel titled Sniper: Assassin's End, was released in 2020.
