= Northmen: A Viking Saga =

2014 historical action film

- Film poster
- Directed by: Claudio Fäh
- Written by: Matthias Bauer; Bastian Zach
- Produced by: Ralph S. Dietrich; Karin G. Dietrich; Daniel Höltschi; Frank Kaminski; Ulrich Stiehm; Rolf Wappenschmitt; Marco Del Bianco; Giselher Venzke; Bertha Spieker
- Starring: Tom Hopper; Ryan Kwanten; Ken Duken; Charlie Murphy; Ed Skrein; Anatole Taubman; Leo Gregory; James Norton; Darrell D'Silva; Johan Hegg; Danny Keogh
- Cinematography: Lorenzo Senatore
- Edited by: Adam Recht ACE
- Music by: Marcus Trumpp
- Production companies: Elite Film Produktion AG; Jumping Horse Film GmbH; Two Oceans Production PTY Ltd.
- Distributed by: The Salt Company; Entertainment One; Elite Filmproduktion AG; Ascot Elite Filmverleih GmbH
- Release date: October 9, 2014
- Running time: 97 minutes
- Country: Switzerland/Germany/South Africa
- Language: English
- Box office: $3,005,082

Northmen: A Viking Saga is a 2014 historical action film by Swiss director Claudio Fäh. It is an English-language film, produced by Swiss production house Elite Film Produktion AG (Zurich) in co-production with Jumping Horse Film GmbH (Germany, Hannover) and Two Oceans Production PTY Ltd. (South Africa, Cape Town).

== Summary ==
A group of exiled Vikings, under the leadership of Asbjörn, are stranded on the coast of Scotland after their ship sinks in a storm. There, they are attacked by soldiers who are escorting the princess Inghean, who is on her way to be married. The Vikings defeat the soldiers and take Inghean with them as a hostage with the intent of ransoming her for money to buy entry into a friendly land. Along the way, they meet a Christian monk who grants them aid and shelter. Meanwhile, Inghean's father, King Dunchaid, tasks a mercenary force to pursue the Vikings; knowing of Inghean's distaste for their group, the mercenary leaders plan to kill both her and the Vikings, an order not out of character for the tyrant king. The group, including the princess, learn of their plan from a captured soldier.

As the mercenaries attack the tower where the monk and the Vikings are sheltered, the group manages to escape and stay ahead of their pursuers. The monk offers to show the Vikings the way to the Viking settlements of the Danelaw, where they would be safe. Along the way, they are repeatedly attacked by the mercenaries, but the Vikings eventually defeat them, suffering some casualties. After reaching a cliffside with transport to Danelaw, the survivors find themselves trapped by King Dunchaid and his troops. Asbjörn jumps into the water, seemingly to his death, but manages to retrieve a boat from an underwater cave. The surviving Vikings jump after him, joined by the monk and Inghean, who elects to stay with the group. Together, the group rows towards the Danelaw.

== Cast ==
- Tom Hopper as Asbjörn
- Ryan Kwanten as Conall
- Ken Duken as Thorald
- Charlie Murphy as Princess Inghean
- Ed Skrein as Hjorr
- Anatole Taubman as Bovarr
- Leo Gregory as Jorund
- James Norton as Bjorn
- Darrell D'Silva as Gunnar
- Johan Hegg as Valli
- Danny Keogh as King Dunchaid

== Production ==
The film is directed by Hollywood-based Swiss director Claudio Fäh from a script by Austrians Mattias Bauer and Bastian Zach, the writers of the Swiss horror film One Way Trip 3D. The actors prepared for the role by undergoing a boot camp before filming began, with stunt rehearsals every day.

=== Location ===
Most of the filming took place in Franschhoek, South Africa, doubling as the location for Scotland.

== Soundtrack ==
The soundtrack of the movie was written by Marcus Trumpp. It also contains 3 metal songs; 1 by the German symphonic metal/power metal band Beyond the Black ("In the Shadows") and 2 by the Swedish melodic death metal band Amon Amarth ("Deceiver of the Gods" and "Warriors of the North"). The frontman of the band Amon Amarth, Johan Hegg, also plays the role of warrior Valli, with director Claudio Fäh stating that Johan was "...born for this, he's a complete natural".

== Reception ==
On Metacritic, the film has a weighted average score of 50 out of 100, based on five critics, indicating "mixed or average reviews". A review from the Los Angeles Times is titled "‘Northmen’s’ Vikings can’t bludgeon audiences into caring about them", while a Variety review states that "Shipwrecked Nords battle medieval Scottish hordes in this respectable multinational actioner".

=== Awards ===
The film received 3rd place in the Zürcher Filmpreis 2015.
