= Gary Chang =

American composer

- Born: February 22, 1953 (age 73); Minneapolis, Minnesota, U.S.
- Genres: Film score; electronic; pop
- Occupations: Composer; musician
- Instrument: Synthesizer
- Years active: 1985–present

Gary Chang (born 22 February 1953) is an American composer and musician, known for his film scores. Working primarily in the action and thriller genres, he has composed the scores to over 70 films and television productions, often collaborating with directors John Frankenheimer and Craig R. Baxley.

== Life and career ==
Born into a family of musicians in Minneapolis, Minnesota, Chang studied at Carnegie Mellon University and the California Institute of the Arts. He studied electronic music under Morton Subotnick, and established himself as a session musician and synthesizer programmer for the likes of Al Jarreau, Herbie Hancock, Chick Correa, Robbie Robertson, and Weather Report.

He began his film scoring career working for Giorgio Moroder and Harold Faltermeyer. His first scoring credit on a film was as an additional music credit for The Breakfast Club (1985), writing and performing the track “Dream Montage”. In 1986, he scored the film 52 Pick-Up for director John Frankenheimer, launching his solo scoring career. He would subsequently work with Frankenheimer on Dead Bang (1989) and The Island of Dr. Moreau (1996).

He frequently works with director Craig R. Baxley, particularly on his Stephen King collaborations. His scores for other directors include Miami Blues, Under Siege, Sniper, The Substitute and Double Team. For his work on Under Siege, he won a BMI Award.

Chang is an associate professor of music composition for the screen at Columbia College Chicago.

== Selected filmography ==
=== Film ===
- The Breakfast Club (1985)
- Firewalker (1986)
- 52 Pick-Up (1986)
- Sticky Fingers (1988)
- Dead Bang (1989)
- A Shock to the System (1990)
- Miami Blues (1990)
- Death Warrant (1990)
- The Perfect Weapon (1991)
- Under Siege (1992)
- Sniper (1993)
- The Island of Dr. Moreau (1996)
- Bad Day on the Block (1996)
- The Substitute (1996)
- Double Team (1997)
- A Soldier's Sweetheart (1998)
- Sniper 2 (2002)
- Left Behind: World at War (2005)

=== Television ===
- Murder in New Hampshire: The Pamela Wojas Smart Story (1991)
- Eerie, Indiana (1991)
- Murder Live! (1997)
- Storm of the Century (1999)
- Rose Red (2002)
- Kingdom Hospital (2004)
