= Sniper: Legacy =

2014 film by Don Michael Paul

- Official DVD cover
- Directed by: Don Michael Paul
- Screenplay by: John Fasano; Don Michael Paul
- Story by: John Fasano
- Based on: Characters by: Michael Frost Beckner; Crash Leyland
- Produced by: Jeffery Beach; Phillip J. Roth; Scott Einbinder
- Starring: Tom Berenger; Chad Michael Collins; Doug Allen; Dominic Mafham; Mercedes Mason; Mark Lewis Jones; Nestor Serrano; Dennis Haysbert
- Cinematography: Martin Chichov
- Edited by: Vanick Moradian
- Music by: Frederik Wiedmann
- Production companies: Destination Films; UFO International Productions
- Distributed by: Sony Pictures Home Entertainment
- Release date: September 30, 2014
- Running time: 98 minutes
- Countries: United States; Bulgaria; Turkey; Greece
- Language: English

Sniper: Legacy is a 2014 American direct-to-video action film directed by Don Michael Paul. It is the fifth installment in the Sniper film series and a sequel to Sniper: Reloaded (2011).

== Plot ==
After military leaders are assassinated, Brandon Beckett (Chad Michael Collins) receives word that his father, Thomas Beckett (Tom Berenger), was among the people assassinated. Attempting to track down David Simpson (Doug Allen), the assassin, a renegade 75th Ranger Regiment sniper, Brandon finds out that his father is not dead and realizes that he is being used as bait.

== Cast ==
- Tom Berenger as Master Gunnery Sergeant Thomas J. "Tom" Beckett
- Chad Michael Collins as Gunnery Sergeant Brandon Becket
- Dominic Mafham as Major Guy "Bullet Face" Bidwell
- Mercedes Mason as Corporal Sanaa Malik
- Doug Allen as David Simpson
- Dennis Haysbert as Colonel
- Alex Roe as Reese
- Nestor Serrano as Steffen
- Yana Marinova as Crane
- Mark Lewis Jones as Shope
- Patrick Garrity as Reese's Spotter
- Woon Young Park as Cantara
- Mike Straub as Soldier
- Raicho Vasilev as Afghanistan Leader (uncredited)

== Sequel ==
A sequel titled Sniper: Ghost Shooter, was released in 2016.
