= Hollow Man 2 =

2006 film by Claudio Fäh

- DVD cover
- Directed by: Claudio Fäh
- Screenplay by: Joel Soisson
- Story by: Gary Scott Thompson
- Based on: Hollow Man by Gary Scott Thompson; Andrew W. Marlowe
- Produced by: David Lancaster
- Starring: Peter Facinelli; Laura Regan; Christian Slater
- Cinematography: Peter Wunstorf
- Edited by: Nathan Easterling
- Music by: Marcus Trumpp
- Production companies: Destination Films; Red Wagon Entertainment
- Distributed by: Sony Pictures Home Entertainment
- Release date: May 23, 2006
- Running time: 91 minutes
- Country: United States
- Language: English

Hollow Man 2 is a 2006 American science fiction thriller film directed by Claudio Fäh, featuring Peter Facinelli, Laura Regan, and Christian Slater in leading roles. Serving as a stand-alone sequel to the 2000 film Hollow Man, the story explores the repercussions of invisibility through the character of Michael Griffin (Slater), a soldier who becomes permanently invisible due to a government experiment gone awry. The film was released direct-to-video on May 23, 2006. Like its predecessor, the film received negative reviews from critics.

== Plot ==
At a cocktail party hosted by a Washington think tank, scientist Devin Villiers is violently abducted by an unseen force into a bathroom. Under duress, Devin discloses the existence of Maggie Dalton, a fellow scientist who possesses crucial knowledge referred to as the "formula" sought by the invisible assailant. The assailant spares Devin's life with a warning not to divulge the incident, but soon after, Devin attempts to alert others and is fatally attacked.

In response to the escalating threat against Maggie Dalton, Dr. William Reisner, owner of the laboratory involved in the invisibility experiment, asks for detectives Frank Turner and Lisa Martinez to be assigned for her protection. Despite their efforts, the invisible assailant manages to infiltrate Maggie's residence, resulting in Lisa's tragic death. Although military forces are deployed to apprehend the invisible man, their efforts prove futile.

Maggie is subsequently placed under protective custody, but Turner aids in her escape upon discovering plans to transfer her into military custody. Maggie reveals that years earlier, scientists had developed a serum for achieving invisibility, which had severe and ultimately fatal side effects. Following the project's covert resurrection by the military, Michael Griffin volunteered as a test subject. However, the antidote intended to counteract the serum's effects failed, leading to Griffin's presumed demise. Later Maggie becomes aware that the buffer was never actually administered.

Turner and Maggie seek refuge with Laurents, a former soldier involved in the program, who discloses that Griffin has been exploited by military authorities to carry out political assassinations. Griffin tracks down Ludlow and attacks him, and Ludlow sacrifices himself to save Turner and Maggie.

Griffin abducts Maggie's sister, and contacts Maggie to recreate the antidote in exchange for her sister's life. He decides to meet on a train station, prompting a confrontation with Turner, who employs invisibility to engage Griffin in combat. Meanwhile Griffin drags Maggie to a lab for the buffer (antidote), where he asks her to inject half the buffer in herself, to be sure its safe for him. Turner follows them and a fight between both ensues. Griffin starts to become visible and badly scarred, revealing Maggie had put rat poison instead of the antidote. Turner takes Maggie to the hospital and vanishes. With Griffin defeated, Maggie and Turner emerge victorious, but emotionally scarred from their harrowing ordeal.

== Cast ==
- Peter Facinelli as Detective Frank Turner
- Laura Regan as Dr. Maggie Dalton
- Christian Slater as Michael Griffin
- David McIlwraith as Dr. William Reisner
- William MacDonald as Colonel Gavin Bishop
- Sarah Deakins as Detective Lisa Martinez
- Jessica Harmon as Heather Dalton
- Sonya Salomaa as Trophy Wife
- Terri Anne Welyki as Pearl Girl
- John Shaw as Dr. Devin Villiers
- Colin Lawrence as Captain Rollins
- Zara Taylor as Ashley
- Nolan Gerard Funk as Josh
- Bruce Dawson as Captain Tom Harrison
- Dean Redman as Police Guard
- Yee Jee Tso as Lab Technician
- Michael Kopsa as Gas Station Man
- Chelah Horsdal as Blind Secretary
- Kevin Bacon as Sebastian Caine (archive footage, uncredited)

== Release ==
Hollow Man 2 was released direct-to-video on May 23, 2006. The DVD included special features such as the "Inside Hollow Man 2" featurette, which provided insights into the visual effects and production process of the movie. The release aimed to offer viewers a deeper exploration of the film's continuation from the original Hollow Man and to showcase advancements in visual effects technology.

== Reception ==
Hollow Man 2 received a negative response from critics. On the review aggregator website Rotten Tomatoes, 17% of 6 critics' reviews are positive. Despite its direct-to-video release, the film attracted attention for its visual effects advancements and thematic continuity with its predecessor.
