= Sniper: Ghost Shooter =

2016 American direct-to-video action film

- Official DVD cover
- Directed by: Don Michael Paul
- Written by: Chris Hauty
- Based on: Characters created by Michael Frost Beckner; Crash Leyland
- Produced by: Jeffery Beach; Phillip J. Roth
- Starring: Chad Michael Collins; Billy Zane; Nick Gomez; Ravil Isyanov; Stephanie Vogt; Dennis Haysbert
- Cinematography: Martin Chichov
- Edited by: Cameron Hallenbeck; Michael Kuge
- Music by: Frederik Wiedmann
- Production companies: Destination Films; UFO International Productions
- Distributed by: Sony Pictures Home Entertainment
- Release date: August 2, 2016
- Running time: 99 minutes
- Country: United States
- Language: English
- Budget: $3 million

Sniper: Ghost Shooter is a 2016 American direct-to-video action film. The film is the sixth installment of the Sniper film series and a sequel to Sniper: Legacy (2014).

== Plot ==
Elite snipers Brandon Beckett and Richard Miller are tasked with protecting a Georgian gas pipeline from terrorists looking to make a statement. When battles with the enemy lead to snipers being killed by a terrorist sniper named Ravshan Gazakov who knows their exact location, tensions boil as a security breach is suspected.

== Cast ==
- Chad Michael Collins as Gunnery Sergeant Brandon Beckett
- Billy Zane as Major Richard Miller
- Dennis Haysbert as The Colonel
- Nick Gomez as Miguel Cervantes
- Ravil Isyanov as Colonel Andrei Mashkov
- Stephanie Vogt as Robin Slater
- Enoch Frost as Sergeant Joe Barnes
- Presciliana Esparolini as Gina Aungst
- Dominic Mafham as Major Guy "Bullet Face" Bidwell
- Navid Neghaban as Robert Mothershed
- Vladimir Kolev as Colonel Sergei Babayev

== Sequel ==
A sequel titled Sniper: Ultimate Kill, was released in 2017.
