= The Bunker (2024 film) =

Film by Brian Hanson

- Release poster
- Directed by: Brian Hanson
- Written by: Charles Bunce; Brian Hanson
- Produced by: Kelby Thwaits; Kayli Fortun; Charles Bunce; Aaron B. Koontz; Brian Hanson
- Starring: Chelsea Edmundson; Chad Michael Collins; Tobin Bell; Tony Todd
- Cinematography: Roman Zenz
- Edited by: Brian Draggaman; Charles Bunce
- Music by: Kelby Thwaits
- Production companies: DBS Pictures; Blood Oath; Paper Street Pictures
- Distributed by: Electric Entertainment
- Release dates: August 16, 2024 (Popcorn Frights); March 2026 (United States)
- Running time: 92 minutes
- Country: United States
- Language: English

The Bunker is a 2024 American science fiction horror film written by Charles Bunce and Brian Hanson and directed by Hanson. It stars Chelsea Edmundson, Chad Michael Collins, Tobin Bell and Tony Todd.

It premiered at the Popcorn Frights film festival on August 16, 2024, and released on digital platforms in March 2026.

== Plot ==
During an alien invasion, a government scientist is trapped in an underground bunker, tasked with developing a biological weapon to stop the invaders.

== Cast ==
- Chelsea Edmundson as Michelle Riley, a micropathogen specialist
- Chad Michael Collins as Sam Ellis, the lead bioengineer of the bio-weapons team
- Tobin Bell as Mr. Riley, Michelle's father
- Tony Todd as Frank Lawrence, part of the army for the White House
- Christopher Matthew Cook as the Handler / Alpha 36
- Cullen Douglas as Finley Barlowe, second-in-command of the bio-weapons team
- Debbie Fan as Denise Cooper, an M.I.T. professor
- Sharif Ibrahim as Jacques Bisset, a nano-engineer
- Spencer Langston as Ben Riley, Michelle's younger brother

== Production ==
The film was inspired by the 2020 COVID-19 lockdowns. Principal photography had begun in May 2021 in Los Angeles. Chelsea Edmundson, Chad Michael Collins, Tony Todd, and Tobin Bell were cast as the leads in the film.

== Release ==
The Bunker had its world premiere at the Popcorn Frights Film Festival in Fort Lauderdale, Florida on August 16, 2024. It was also shown at the 25th FrightFest film festival on August 23 and the 25th Trieste Science+Fiction Festival on October 31. In May 2024, Jackrabbit Media led sales at the 2024 Cannes Film Festival.

In April 2025, Electric Entertainment acquired North American distribution rights, and was released on digital platforms in March 2026.

== Reception ==
Anton Bitel of SciFiNow gave the film four stars out of five.
