= Chad Michael Collins =

American actor (born 1979)

- Born: September 22, 1979 (age 47); Albany, New York, U.S.
- Other name: Chad Collins
- Occupation: Actor
- Years active: 2005–present
- Website: chadmichaelcollins.com

Chad Michael Collins (born September 22, 1979) is an American actor and martial artist. He is best known for his leading role in the Sniper film series, in which he portrays Gunnery Sergeant Brandon Beckett, the son of Master Gunnery Sergeant Thomas Beckett, portrayed by Tom Berenger and as Alex Keller from Call of Duty video game series, starting with the 2019 reboot.

== Biography ==
He graduated from college in New York before moving to Los Angeles, California. He then started taking acting classes, when he is not acting, he works for a PR firm, JDS.

== Filmography ==
=== Film ===
Year	Title	Role	Notes
2005	Legion of the Dead	Carter	Direct-to-video
2009	Room 33	Chad	
2011	Sniper: Reloaded	Sergeant Brandon Beckett	Direct-to-video
2012	RockBarnes: The Emperor in You	Gay Consultant Theodore	
2013	Company of Heroes	Nathaniel "Nate" Burrows, Jr.	Direct-to-video
2014	Sunken City	Officer Andy Ross	
2014	Sniper: Legacy	Sergeant Brandon Beckett	Direct-to-video
2016	Sniper: Ghost Shooter	Sergeant Brandon Beckett	Direct-to-video
2017	Sniper: Ultimate Kill	Sergeant Brandon Beckett	Direct-to-video
2019	Howlers	Colt	
2019	The Christmas Cabin	Seth Walker	
2020	Sniper: Assassin's End	Sergeant Brandon Beckett	Direct-to-video
2022	Sniper: Rogue Mission	Sergeant Brandon Beckett	Direct-to-video
2022	Dead Zone	Ajax	
2023	One Year Off	Harry Buchanan	
2023	Sniper: G.R.I.T. – Global Response & Intelligence Team	Sergeant Brandon Beckett	Direct-to-video
2024	The Bunker	Dr. Sam Ellis	
2024	Edge of Space	Glen Ford	
2025	Sniper: The Last Stand	Sergeant Brandon Beckett	Direct-to-video
2025	The Wrecker	Bobby	
2026	Sniper: No Nation	Sergeant Brandon Beckett	Direct-to-video

=== Television ===
Year	Title	Role	Notes
2005	Guilty or Innocent?	Jeb Ashley	Episode: "The Herb Whitlock Case"
2006	The Christmas Card	Lewis	Television film
2007	Lake Placid 2	Scott Riley	Television film
2008	Rock Monster	Jason	Television film
2008–2009	Greek	Lambda Sig Brother / Tim	2 episodes
2010	CSI: NY	Officer Giles	Episode: "Damned If You Do"
2011	NCIS	Navy Petty Officer First Class Simon Craig	Episode: "Recruited"
2011	CSI: Miami	Logan Shepherd	Episode: "Caged"
2011	90210	Officer Atwood	2 episodes
2011	Enlightened	Will	Episode: "The Weekend"
2011	Love's Christmas Journey	Owen King	Television film
2012	Ringer	Agent Conroy	Episode: "You're Way Too Pretty to Go to Jail"
2012	2 Broke Girls	Zeke Zand	Episode: "And The Spring Break"
2012	Major Crimes	Greg Miller	Episode: "Reloaded"
2012	Last Resort	Redman	2 episodes
2013	Once Upon a Time	Gerhardt Frankenstein / Frankenstein's Monster	Episode: "In the Name of the Brother"
2014	Blue Bloods	John Russell	Episode: "Unfinished Business"
2014	CSI: Crime Scene Investigation	FBI pilot	Episode: "Kitty"
2014	Castle	Tom Talmadge	Episode: "Clear & Present Danger"
2014	Bones	Travis Leete	Episode: "The Geek in the Guck"
2015	NCIS: New Orleans	Navy Lieutenant Val "Gator" Franco	Episode: "Touched by the Sun"
2016	Freakish	John Collins	3 episode
2017	Extinct	Ezra	Main role
2018	Home Invaders	Drew	Television film
2018	Shooter	Young Ray Brooks	Episode: "The Red Badge"
2018	Christmas Cupid's Arrow	Josh	Television film
2018	Sisters in Crime	Andy Griggs	Television film
2019	MacGyver	Reese	Episode: "Lidar + Rogues + Duty"
2019	Creepshow	Dr. Sloan	Episode: "Skincrawlers/By the Silver Water of Lake Champlain"
2026	Marshals	Owen Kilborn (Double G)	Episode: "Recurring Guest Season 1"
2026	NCIS	Army CID Major Matt Malone	Episode: "Army of One"

=== Video games ===
Year	Title	Role	Note
2017	Hidden Agenda	Jack Calvary	
2019	Call of Duty: Modern Warfare	Alex Keller “Echo 3-1”	Voice and motion capture performance Playable character, both in Campaign and Multiplayer.
2022	Call of Duty: Modern Warfare II	Alex Keller “Echo 3-1”	Voice and motion capture performance. Playable character in Multiplayer and Co-op game modes.
2023	Call of Duty: Modern Warfare III	Alex Keller “Echo 3-1”	Voice and motion capture performance. Playable character in Multiplayer. Non-playable character in Campaign.
