= Dan Butler =

American actor (born 1954)

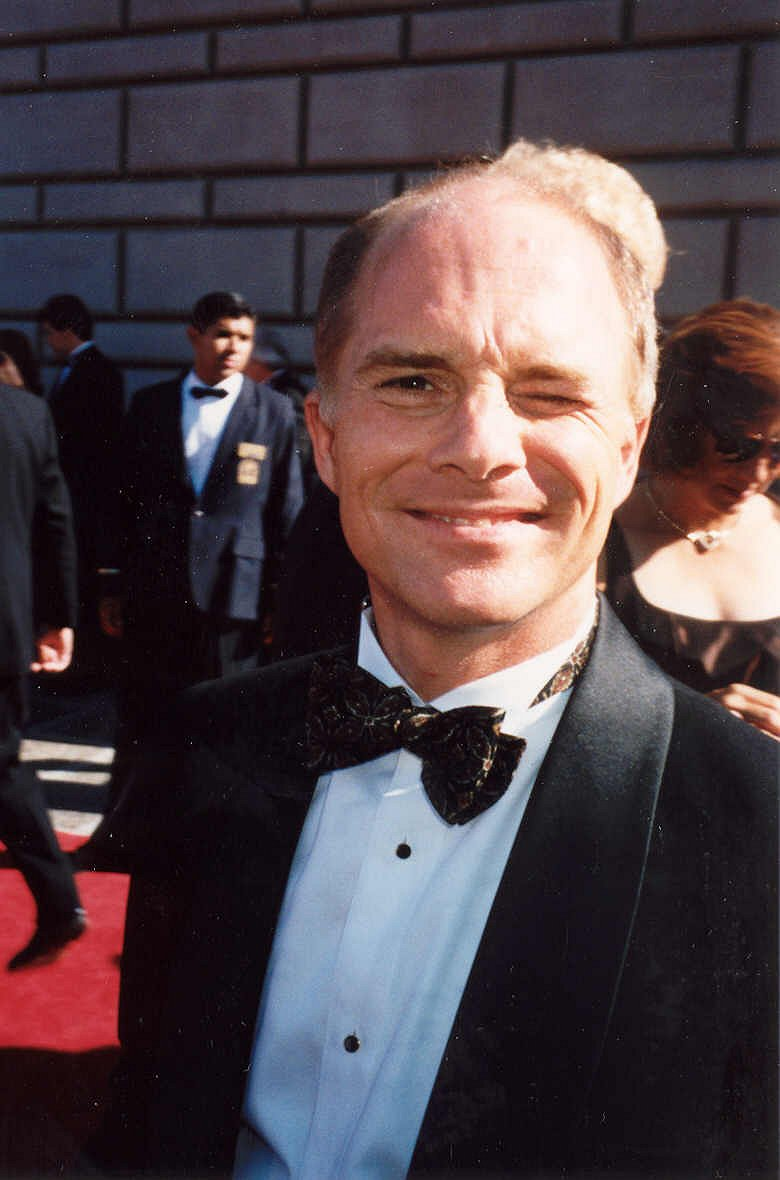
- Butler in 1995
- Born: Daniel Eugene Butler; December 2, 1954 (age 71); Huntington, Indiana, U.S.
- Occupations: Actor, voice actor
- Years active: 1982–present
- Spouse: Richard Waterhouse

Daniel Eugene Butler (born December 2, 1954) is an American actor known for his role as Bob "Bulldog" Briscoe on the TV series Frasier (1993–2004), later reprising the role in 2024; Art in Roseanne (1991–1992); for the voice of Mr. Simmons on the Nickelodeon TV show Hey Arnold! (1997–2002), later reprising the role in Hey Arnold!: The Jungle Movie (2017); and for film roles in Enemy of the State (1998) and Sniper 2 (2001).

== Education ==
Butler was born in Huntington, Indiana, and raised in Fort Wayne. He is the son of Shirley, a homemaker, and Andrew Butler, a pharmacist. While a drama student at Purdue University Fort Wayne in 1975, he received the Irene Ryan Acting Scholarship, sponsored by the Kennedy Center. From 1976 to 1978, he trained at the American Conservatory Theater in San Francisco.

== Career ==
Butler is best known for his role as Bob "Bulldog" Briscoe in the NBC sitcom Frasier, appearing in every season but one between 1993 and 2004. The character was a volatile, boorish, intensely macho sports presenter who hosted the show which followed Frasier's daily broadcast at the radio station KACL. Butler directed one episode during season five of Frasier. He is also one of two actors to play two characters in the Hannibal Lecter franchise. In 1986, he played the role of Jimmy Price, a technician in the film Manhunter; then, 5 years later, he played the role of Roden in 1991's The Silence of The Lambs. The other actor is Frankie Faison. In 1998, Butler played the role of NSA Director Admiral Shaffer in Enemy of the State and in 2006, Butler produced and starred in the faux documentary Karl Rove, I Love You (which he also co-wrote and co-directed). Other film work includes roles in Prayers for Bobby and Longtime Companion. Butler is an established stage actor. In 2018, he played Lenin in the Broadway revival of Tom Stoppard's Travesties. Other recent appearances include as Truman Capote in American Repertory Theater's 2017 production of Rob Roth's Warhol/Capote and Jack in the 2013 Off-Broadway production of Conor McPherson's The Weir.

== Personal life ==
Butler lives in Vermont and is married to producer Richard Waterhouse. He came out to his family when he was in his early 20s. He wrote a one-man show, The Only Thing Worse You Could Have Told Me, which opened in Los Angeles in 1994 and also played in San Francisco and off-Broadway in New York. It was Butler's public coming out. The play had ten characters "just processing what gay means". He was nominated for the 1995 Drama Desk Award for Outstanding One-Person Show.

== Filmography ==
=== Film ===
Year	Title	Role	Notes
1986	The Manhattan Project	SWAT	as Dan E. Butler
1986	Manhunter	Jimmy Price	as Dan E. Butler
1989	Longtime Companion	Walter	
1990	The Long Walk Home	Charlie	
1991	The Silence of the Lambs	Roden	
1992	Captain Ron	Bill Zachery	
1993	Dave	Reporter	
1996	The Fan	Garrity	
1997	The Silver Screen: Color Me Lavender	Dan E. Butler	as Dan E. Butler
1998	Enemy of the State	NSA Director Admiral Shaffer	
2002	Sniper 2	CIA Agent James Eckles	
2008	Chronic Town	Blow Job	
2009	Prayers for Bobby	Reverend Whitsell	Television film
2011	Crazy, Stupid, Love	Cal's boss	
2014	Chu and Blossom	Mr. Kirkpatrick	
2020	All My Life	Dr. Alan Mendelson	
2022	Blonde	I.E. Shinn	

=== Television ===
Year	Title	Role	Notes
1982	Remington Steele	Morgue attendant	Episode: "Your Steele the One for Me"; Uncredited
1987	Leg Work	Peter Solinski	Episode: "Blind Trust"
1990	Monsters	David	Episode: "A New Woman"
1991–1993	Quantum Leap	Jake Dorleac; Mutta	Episode: "Southern Comforts"; Episode: "Mirror Image"
1991–1992	Roseanne	Art	3 episodes
1992	Columbo	Sergeant Goodman	Episode: "No Time to Die"
1993	Life Goes On	Ed	Episode: "Incident on Main"
1993	The Powers That Be	Walt Stevens	Episode: "Bradley Gets Fired"
1993–2004	Frasier	Bob "Bulldog" Briscoe	53 episodes
1993	Picket Fences	Joe Henley	Episode: "Duty Free Rome"
1995	The X-Files	Jim Ausbury	Episode: "Die Hand Die Verletzt"
1995–1997	Caroline in the City	Kenneth Arabian	2 episodes
1997–2002	Hey Arnold!	Mr. Sawyer / Robert Simmons	34 episodes Voice
1997–1998	King of the Hill	Attorney; Daniel	Episode: "Jumpin' Crack Bass"; Episode: "Death of a Propane Salesman"
1998	Tracey Takes On...	Priest	Episode: "Religion"
1998	Star Trek: Voyager	Steth	Episode: "Vis à Vis"
1998	From the Earth to the Moon	NASA Flight Director Eugene Kranz	2 episodes
1998	Just Shoot Me!	Bill Slatton	Episode: "Eve of Destruction"
1998	More Tales of the City	Edward Bass Matheson	Episode: "Episode #1.2"
1998	Suddenly Susan	Dr. Richards	Episode: "War Games"
1999	Touched by an Angel	Dr. Ivar Kroneberger	Episode: "Anatomy Lesson"
1999	Ally McBeal	Attorney Bender	Episode: "Changes"
1999	Rocket Power	Slack	Episode: "Powergirl Surfers"
2002	Crossing Jordan	Arnold Hummer	Episode: "The Gift of Life"
2002–2003	American Dreams	Coach Ambros	4 episodes
2003	Without a Trace	David Wilkins	Episode: "The Source"
2005	Malcolm in the Middle	Norm	Episode: "Butterflies"
2005	Supernatural	Reverend Sorenson	Episode: "Hook Man"
2006	House	Dr. Philip Weber	Episode: "Distractions"
2007	Monk	Dr. Davis Scott	Episode: "Mr. Monk Goes to the Hospital"
2007	'Til Death	Paul	Episode: "Clay Date"
2008	Cashmere Mafia	Maxwell Tate	Episode: "Yours, Mine, and Hers"
2010	Law & Order: Criminal Intent	Congressman Price	Episode: "Lost Children of the Blood"
2014	The Mysteries of Laura	Calvin Gold	Episode: "The Mystery of the Sex Scandal"
2015	Blindspot	Paul Bolton	Episode: "Sent On Tour": Blindspot (episode: "Sent On Tour", 2015)
2016	Banshee	Senator Mitchum	2 episodes
2016	Blue Bloods	SBS President Randy Grant	Episode: "Blast from the Past"
2017	The Mist	Father Romanov	6 episodes
2017	Hey Arnold!: The Jungle Movie	Robert Simmons	Television film Voice
2018	Elementary	Denny Mulgrew	Episode: "Whatever Remains, However Improbable"
2019	Tales of the City		Episode: "The Price of Oil"
2023	The Blacklist	Attorney General Karl Stromberg	Episode: "Arthur Hudson"
2024	Frasier	Bob "Bulldog" Briscoe	Episode: "Thank You, Dr. Crane"
