= Kaare Andrews =

Canadian comic book artist and writer

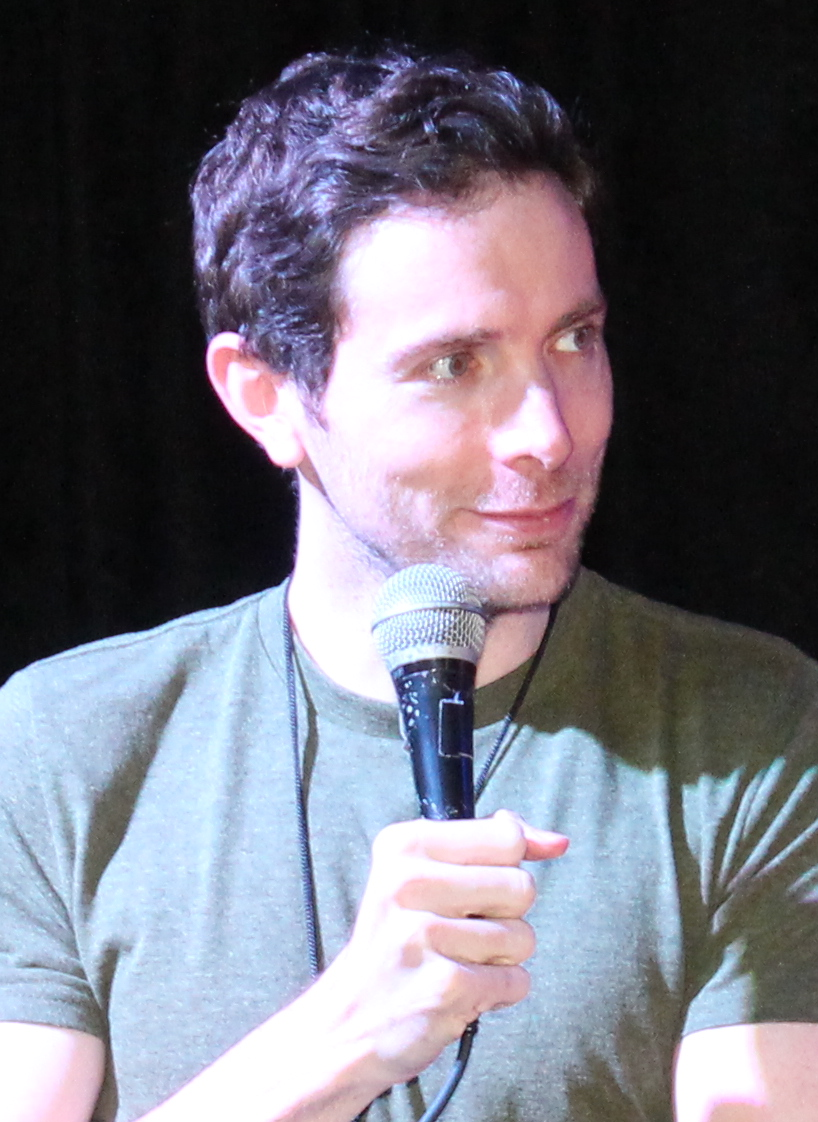
- Image of Kaare Andrews
- Born: Kaare Kyle Andrews; July 13, 1975 (age 51) Canada
- Areas: Cartoonist, Writer, Penciller, Inker
- Notable works: Iron Fist, Renato Jones, Spider-Man: Reign, Marvel Mangaverse Spider-Man, Incredible Hulk, X-Men, Altitude, The ABCs of Death, Cabin Fever: Patient Zero, Sniper: Assassin's End
- Awards: "Outstanding comicbook artist" – Joe Shuster Awards (2005), "Best Director" – Victoria Film Slam, "Outstanding VFX" – Leo Awards (2013)

Kaare Kyle Andrews (born 1975) is a comic book writer, artist and filmmaker from Saskatoon, Saskatchewan. His work includes Spider-Man, Iron Fist, Renato Jones, and Incredible Hulk. Andrews has a diverse drawing style, which ranges from hyper realistic to more cartoonesque. He was the first recipient of the Shuster Award for Outstanding Artist for his work on Spider-Man: Doctor Octopus. His latest film, Sniper: Assassin's End reached #1 on iTunes in September 2020.

== Career ==
Andrews' began his career writing short stories. He became a member of the Writer's Bloc club that originated on Wizard's Wizard World website.

Andrews began working at Marvel Comics, where his work has been featured across many series, including: Incredible Hulk, Iron Fist, Ultimate X-Men, Hawkeye, and The Amazing Spider-Man. He has created several characters including Mangaverse Spider-Man for Marvel Mangaverse, a martial arts spin on the character which was spun off into another mini-series written by Andrews, as well as toys and videogames. In 2006, Andrews wrote and drew a four-issue mini-series set 35 years in the future known as Spider-Man: Reign, starring a retired Spider-Man. The series was named one of the 25 greatest Spider-Man stories by Complex and one of "10 Spider-Man Stories Every Fan Should Read" by Comic Book Resources.

Andrews wrote, pencilled, inked and colored the 2014 relaunch of Marvel's Iron Fist: The Living Weapon.

He has also designed album covers, including The Beta Band's 2004 album Heroes to Zeros and Tegan and Sara's 2002 album, If It Was You, as well as directing the music video for their single "Living Room". In 2004, Andrews began working in the film industry, directing short films and public service announcements.

In October 2010, Andrews released his debut feature film Altitude, starring Jessica Lowndes and Julianna Guill, a thriller about five friends on a small aircraft lost in a supernatural storm. Altitude was named one of the Top 15 Giant Monster Movies Of The 21st Century.

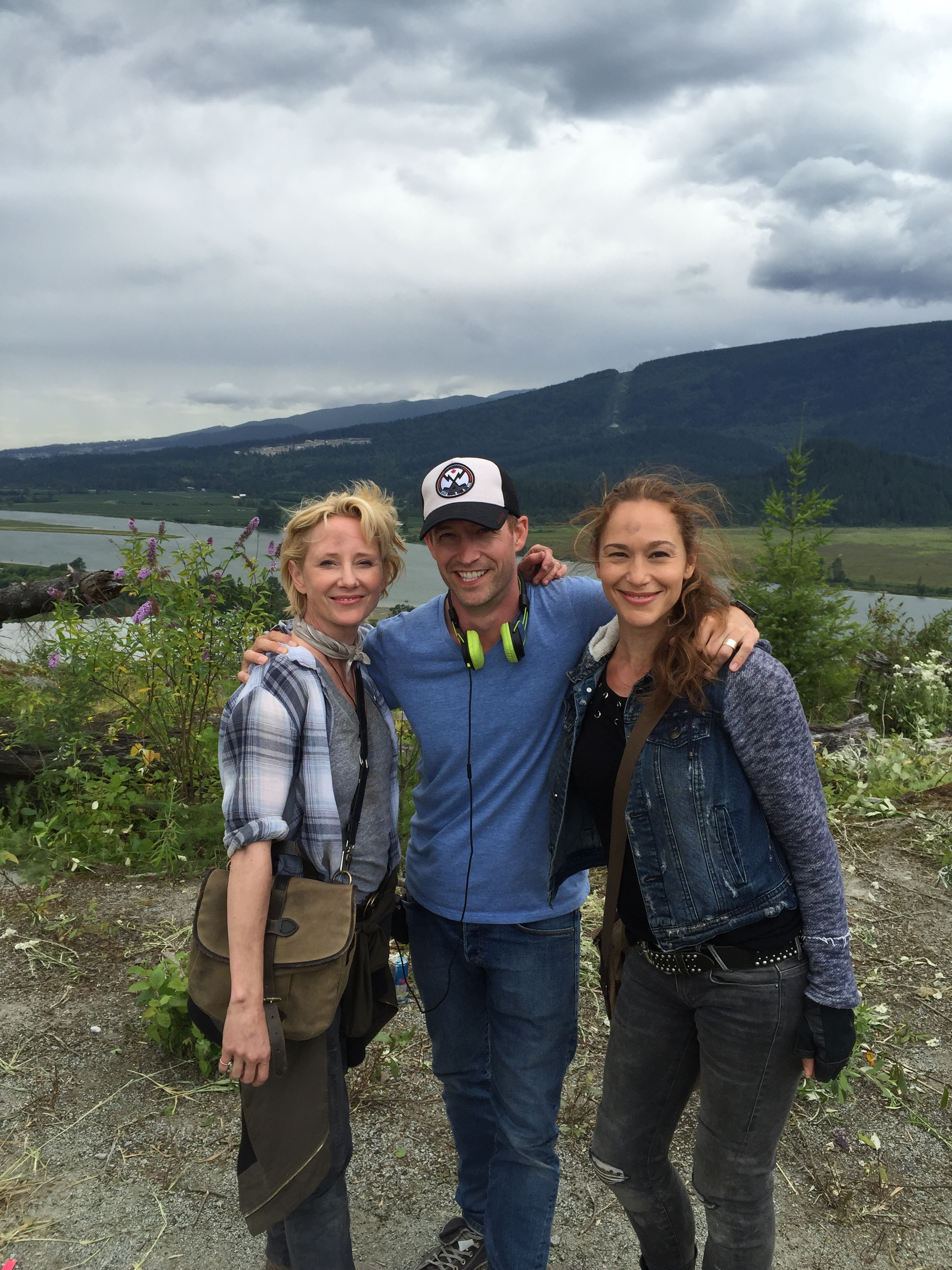
Kaare Andrews directing Aftermath

Andrews directed the segment "V is for Vagitus" for the anthology film, The ABCs of Death, released in 2013. This was followed by Cabin Fever: Patient Zero, released in 2014 and starring Sean Astin. His latest film Sniper: Assassin's End, starring Tom Berenger, was released in 2020 and hit #1 on iTunes

Andrews has been directing television for the past couple of years including stints on Van Helsing (SyFy/Netflix), Aftermath (SyFY), Mech-X4 (Disney) and V Wars for Netflix in 2020.

== Works ==
=== Bibliography ===
- The Writers’ Bloc Anthology (1997), Writers' bloc annual '98 (1998) & Writers' bloc annual '99 (1999)
- Wonderlanders #1–2 (artist only, Oktomica Comics, 1999)
- Intrigue #1–2 (pencils only, with writer/inker Howard M. Shum, Image Comics, 2000)
- Before the Fantastic Four: Ben Grimm and Logan (artist, 3-issue mini-series, Marvel Comics, 2000)
- Gen^{13} #64-65 (artist only, with writer & cover artist Adam Warren, Wildstorm, c. 2001)
- Spider-Man's Tangled Web #10 (writer & artist, Marvel, 2001)
- Marvel Mangaverse: Spider-Man (writer & artist, one-shot, Marvel, 2002)
- Spider-Man: Legend of the Spider Clan (writer only, mini-series, Marvel, 2002)
- X-Men Unlimited #37 (writer, cover artist & penciller of some interior pages, Marvel, 2002)
- Ultimate X-Men #23–24 (artist, with writer Mark Millar, Marvel, 2002)
- Thundercats/Battle Of The Planets (one-shot) (writer and artist, DC/Wildstorm, 2003)
- Spider-Man/Doctor Octopus: Year One mini-series (artist, with writer Zeb Wells, Marvel, 2004)
- Wolverine #32 (artist, with writer Mark Millar, Marvel, 2005)
- Spider-Man: Reign (artist and writer, 4-issue mini-series, Marvel, 2006)
- Spider-Man: Reign 2 (artist and writer, 5-issue mini-series, Marvel, 2024-2025)
- Astonishing X-Men (artist, with writer Warren Ellis, Marvel):
  - Ghost Boxes #2 (2-issue mini-series, January 2009, included in Astonishing X-Men, Volume 5: Ghost Box, 184 pages, softcover, December 2009, ISBN 0-7851-2788-7, premiere hardcover, September 2009, ISBN 0-7851-3390-9)
  - Xenogenesis (5-issue limited series, July 2010 – April 2011, collected in Astonishing X-Men: Xenogenesis, 160 pages, premiere hardcover, March 2011, ISBN 0-7851-4491-9))
- AvX #4 Thor vs. Emma Frost (writer, artist)
- A+X #4 Spider-man and Beast (writer, artist)
- Iron Fist: The Living Weapon (writer, artist)
- Immortal Iron Fists (writer, 2017)
- Renato Jones: The One % (writer, artist – Image, 2016)

==== Covers ====
- Iron Man Vol. 3 #33–36, 38, Annual 2000 (Marvel, 2000–2001)
- Peter Parker: Spider-Man #27–29 (Marvel, 2001)
- The Amazing Spider-Man vol. 2 #37–39 (#478–480) (Marvel, 2001–2002)
- Incredible Hulk #34–54 (Marvel, 2002–2003)
- Ultimate Adventures #1–6 (Marvel, 2002–2003)
- Black Panther #6–7 (Marvel, 2005)
- Amazing Spider-Man #522 (Marvel, 2005)
- Wolverine #34–35 & 37–40 (Marvel, 2005–2006)
- G.I. Joe vs Transformers #1 (Image, 2003)
- The Matrix Comics Volume 2 (Burlyman Entertainment, 2004)
- Iron Fist (Marvel, 2008)
- Dead of Night (Marvel, 2008)
- Ultimate Comics: X-Men #1–13 (Marvel, 2011)
- Ultimate Comics: The Ultimates #1–12 (Marvel, 2011)
- Ultimate Comics: Spider-Man #1–11 (Marvel, 2011)
- Ultimate Comics: Hawkeye #1–4 (Marvel, 2011)
- Reborn #2 (variant cover, Image, 2016)

=== Filmography ===
- Altitude (2010)
- "V is for Vagitus" in The ABCs of Death (2012)
- Cabin Fever: Patient Zero (2014)
- Sniper: Assassin's End (2020)

==== TV series ====
- Van Helsing
- Aftermath
- Siblings
- The Other Kingdom
- Mech-X4
- V Wars
