= Claudio Fäh =

Swiss film director, producer and screenwriter

- Born: 29 March 1975 (age 51); Altdorf, Switzerland
- Occupations: Film director, producer, screenwriter
- Years active: 1996–present
- Spouse: Martina Meier (m. 2003)
- Children: 2

Claudio Fäh (born 29 March 1975) is a Swiss film director, producer and screenwriter.

== Career ==
Fäh has directed films such as Coronado, Hollow Man 2, Sniper: Reloaded and Sniper: Ultimate Kill, as well as webisodes of Ghost Whisperer: The Other Side, the online companion series to CBS's Ghost Whisperer.

During fall 2013, he directed Northmen: A Viking Saga.

== Personal life ==
As of 1999, Fäh lives in Los Angeles, California. He married Martina Meier, a doctor, in 2003. Together, they have two daughters.

== Filmography ==
Short film

Year	Title	Director	Producer	Writer	Notes
1996	Kilometer 11	Yes	Yes	Yes	
1997	Strandsonntag	Yes	Yes	Yes	
1998	Hit the Highway, Honey	Yes	Yes	Yes	
2018	Child of the Earth	Yes	Yes	Yes	Short documentary

Feature film

Year	Title	Director	Producer	Writer
2003	Coronado	Yes		Yes
2006	Hollow Man 2	Yes		
2009	The Hole		Yes	
2011	Sniper: Reloaded	Yes	Yes	
2014	Northmen: A Viking Saga	Yes		
2016	Beyond Valkyrie: Dawn of the 4th Reich	Yes		
2017	Sniper: Ultimate Kill	Yes		
2024	No Way Up	Yes		
2025	Turbulence	Yes		

Television

Year	Title	Notes
2007-2008	Ghost Whisperer: The Other Side	16 episodes
2022	Wilder	6 episodes
2026	Tatort	Episode "Könige der Nacht"
