= Don Michael Paul =

American actor

- Born: Donald Michael Paul; April 17, 1963 (age 63)
- Occupations: Actor, director, writer, producer
- Years active: 1983–present
- Children: Jett Jones Paul

Donald Michael Paul (born April 17, 1963) is an actor, director, writer, and producer.

== Biography ==
He starred in the films Heart of Dixie and Rich Girl with Jill Schoelen and appeared in Aloha Summer. He wrote the screenplay for Harley Davidson and the Marlboro Man. He acted in the short-lived 1992 CBS detective series The Hat Squad. He played a prominent role in Models Inc. and Robot Wars.

He has directed several films, including Half Past Dead in 2002, Lake Placid: The Final Chapter (2012), and Tremors 5: Bloodlines.

== Filmography ==
=== Filmmaking credits ===
Year	Name	Director	Writer	Notes
1991	Harley Davidson and the Marlboro Man	No	Yes	Also co-producer
2002	Half Past Dead	Yes	Yes	Directorial debut
2006	The Garden	Yes	No	
2007	Who's Your Caddy?	Yes	Yes	
2013	Company of Heroes	Yes	No	Direct-to-video
2014	Jarhead 2: Field of Fire	Yes	No	Direct-to-video
2014	Sniper: Legacy	Yes	Yes	Direct-to-video
2015	Tremors 5: Bloodlines	Yes	No	Direct-to-video
2016	Kindergarten Cop 2	Yes	No	Direct-to-video
2016	Sniper: Ghost Shooter	Yes	No	Direct-to-video
2016	Beyond Valkyrie: Dawn of the 4th Reich	No	Yes	Direct-to-video
2018	Tremors: A Cold Day in Hell	Yes	No	Direct-to-video
2018	Death Race: Beyond Anarchy	Yes	Yes	Direct-to-video
2018	The Scorpion King: Book of Souls	Yes	No	Direct-to-video
2019	Jarhead: Law of Return	Yes	Yes	Direct-to-video
2020	Bulletproof 2	Yes	Yes	Direct-to-video
2020	Tremors: Shrieker Island	Yes	Yes	Direct-to-video
2024	Finding Faith	No	Yes	

=== Acting credits ===
Year	Name	Role	Notes
1984	Lovelines	Jeff	
1986	Dangerously Close	"Ripper"	
1987	Winners Take All	Rick Melon	
1987	Down Twisted	Airplane Mechanic	
1987	Rolling Vengeance	Joey Rosso	
1988	Alien from L.A.	Robbie	
1988	Aloha Summer	Chuck	
1989	Winter People	Young Wright	
1989	Heart of Dixie	"Boots" Claibourne	
1991	Rich Girl	Rick Asbury	
1993	Robot Wars	Captain Marion Drake	
2002	Dead Above Ground	Tom Bradley	
2002	Half Past Dead	SWAT Captain	
2005	The Island	Bar Guy	
2009	You	Jack	
2011	Europa	Grant Clarke	Short
2021	The Protégé	Steverino	
2024	Piece by Piece	Gary (voice)	

=== Other credits ===
Year	Title	Contribution
1989	Cyborg	Uncredited written contributor, assistant sound editor
2011	Seven Days in Utopia.	Creative consultant, second unit director

=== Filmmaking credits ===
Year(s)	Name	Director	Writer	Notes
1996	Renegade	Yes	No	Episode: "Stationary Target"
1996	Pacific Blue	Yes	No	Episode: "The Daystalker"
1996–1998	Silk Stalkings	Yes	Yes	Director episodes: "Family Values" & "Runway Strip" / Writer episode: "Behind the Music"
1999	The Disciples	No	Yes	Television film
2000	The Magnificent Seven	No	Yes	Episode: "Penance"
2012	Lake Placid: The Final Chapter	Yes	No	Television films
2013	Taken: The Search for Sophie Parker	Yes	No	Television films

=== Acting credits ===
Year(s)	Name	Role	Notes
1983	Trauma Center	Unknown	Episode: "Trail's End"
1985	The Best Times	Luke Malloy	Episode: "The Crash"
1985	CBS Schoolbreak Special	Adam Tarcher	Episode: "The War Between the Classes"
1986	The Brotherhood of Justice	Collin	Television film
1987–1988	J.J. Starbuck	Tommy Watkins	2 episodes
1992–1993	The Hat Squad	Buddy	13 episodes
1993	The Adventures of Brisco County, Jr.	Juno Dawkins	Episode: "Steel Horses"
1994	Search for Grace	Dave / Sam	Television film
1994	Renegade	Sergeant Carrick O'Quinn	Episode: "Carrick O'Quinn"
1994–1995	Models Inc.	Craig Bodi	17 episodes
1997	Pacific Blue	Roger Jackson	Episode: "Avenging Angel"
2000	Celebrity	Craig	Television film
2001	The Beast	Peter Daschle	Episode: "Travinia: Part 2"
2001–2002	Strong Medicine	Harry Burr	4 episodes
2003	CSI: Miami	Mason Shaw	Episode: "Hard Time"
2005	CSI: Crime Scene Investigation	Mark Horvatin Sr.	Episode: "Gum Drops"
2013	Jet Stream	Major Shaw	Television film

=== Music video ===
- 2011: I Wish, I Wish for Lauren Bennett

=== Commercials ===
Year(s)	Name	Subject
2010–2011	Pepsi Max two commercials	Pepsi
2011	Sierra Mist Natural	Pepsi
2012	Live For Now	Pepsi
