= Sniper (1993 film) =

- Theatrical release poster
- Directed by: Luis Llosa
- Written by: Michael Frost Beckner; Crash Leyland
- Produced by: Robert L. Rosen
- Starring: Tom Berenger; Billy Zane; J. T. Walsh
- Cinematography: Bill Butler
- Edited by: M. Scott Smith
- Music by: Gary Chang
- Production companies: Baltimore Pictures; Iguana Producciones; Sniper Productions
- Distributed by: TriStar Pictures (North America); Odyssey Entertainment (International)
- Release date: January 29, 1993
- Running time: 99 minutes
- Country: United States
- Language: English
- Budget: $5.3 million
- Box office: $19 million

Sniper is a 1993 American action film directed by Luis Llosa. The film stars Tom Berenger and Billy Zane as snipers on an assassination mission in Panama. It is the first installment in the Sniper film series, and was followed by eleven direct-to-video sequels. It was shot in Queensland, Australia, and debuted at number two in the United States.

== Plot ==
Master Gunnery Sergeant Thomas Beckett, Force Reconnaissance Marine, an experienced sniper, and his spotter, Corporal Papich, are on a mission to assassinate a Panamanian rebel leader in the jungle. Upon successful completion of their mission, Beckett and Papich covertly withdraw from the area to await extraction. Because they are erroneously extracted in daylight instead of at night, Papich is killed by a sniper.

Later, Beckett is paired with an inexperienced civilian, Richard Miller, to eliminate rebel General Miguel Alvarez funded by a Colombian drug lord, Raoul Ochoa. Miller is an Olympic medalist and SWAT team sharpshooter, but he has no combat experience and no confirmed kills to his name. Miller is also ordered by his superiors to kill Beckett if he becomes a liability. While proceeding to the staging area, Miller's UH-1 helicopter is fired upon by a guerrilla. Several of the helicopter's crew and passengers are killed. Miller is unable to shoot him; instead, the helicopter's fatally-wounded door-gunner makes the kill, but the aircraft's surviving aviator believes Miller made the crucial shot, earning Miller a false reputation.

On the mission, Beckett insists on deviating from the plan that Miller was given. Early on, they encounter a group of Indians, who agree to lead them past the rebel guerrillas, in return for a favor: they must agree to eliminate El Cirujano 'The Surgeon', an ex-CIA agent and expert in torture who has been aiding the rebels. Beckett agrees to do so.

Uncertain of Miller's reliability and skeptical about his "kill" while recently aboard the helicopter, he tells Miller to kill El Cirujano in order to prove himself. However, when the time comes, Miller fails again by first firing a "warning shot," followed by a shot at Cirujano's head, which misses. In the ensuing firefight with the alarmed guerrillas, one of the Indians is killed; the rest withdraw further help.

En route to the target, they realize they are being followed by another sniper. They head to a village to contact their informant, a priest, only to find that he has been murdered well before they arrived. Beckett speculates out loud that it is the work of El Cirujano, calling into question Miller's credibility. That night, Beckett baits the sniper following them into a trap to take him out.

The two men finally reach the General's hacienda. While waiting for their targets to emerge, they find Cirujano to be alive after all. Miller isn't hidden very well, and is spotted by one of the guards trying to sneak up on him. Beckett kills Miller's attacker while Miller takes out the drug lord. Being forced to save Miller's life instead of killing the General, Beckett insists on going back to take out the General. Miller's refusal to complete the mission leads to an exchange of fire between Beckett and Miller. Miller ceases after running out of ammunition.

As rebels close in on the two, Beckett attempts to provide cover fire for Miller. Seeing himself outnumbered, he surrenders to the rebels and, knowing Miller is watching, drops a bullet on the ground. Miller picks it up after Beckett is taken away.

With nighttime approaching, Miller goes to the extraction site, but instead of boarding the helicopter, he heads to the base camp, where he kills the general with his knife. He finds Beckett being tortured by El Cirujano, who has cut off the trigger finger of Beckett's right hand. Beckett spots Miller and uses a ploy to both distract Cirujano and mouth Miller instruction to kill both of them with one shot. Instead, Miller sticks to "one shot, one kill" and shoots Cirujano in the head. The two run to the helicopter for extraction, and Beckett once again saves Miller's life. Using his left hand, he uses Cirujano's pistol to shoot an ambushing sniper. Finally Beckett and Miller return home aboard the helicopter.

== Cast ==
- Tom Berenger as Master Gunnery Sergeant Thomas J. "Tom" Beckett
- Billy Zane as NSC Agent Richard Miller
- J. T. Walsh as Colonel Chester Van Damme
- Aden Young as Corporal Doug Papich
- Ken Radley as "El Cirujano", Ex-CIA agent whose nickname in Spanish means the surgeon.
- Reynaldo Arenas as Cacique, Indian native chief of Panama.
- Don Battee as T.J., Soldier on U.S. base in Panama.
- Loury Cortez as Father Ruiz, passes along intelligence to Beckett.
- Gary Swanson as NSC Officer in Washington
- Hank Garrett as Admiral in Washington
- Rex Linn as Colonel Weymuth (uncredited)
- Frederick Miragliotta as General Miguel Alvarez
- Vanessa Steele as Mrs. Alvarez
- Carlos Alvarez as Raul Ochoa
- Tyler Coppin as Ripoly
- Teo Gebert as Ripoly's friend
- Edward Wiley as Desilva, Rebel sniper trained by Beckett.
- Roy Edmunds as Captain Cabrera, Rebel Captain killed in the opening scene.

== Production ==
Billy Zane was cast after his starring role in Dead Calm raised his profile. Director Luis Llosa, who grew up watching American films, called modern films "cartoonish and antiseptic" in their depiction of violence; he said that he wanted to bring back a sense of impact to killing.

Principal filming began in August 1991 at locations in Queensland, Australia including Port Douglas, Paronella Park, and Kuranda. Some additional filming was done in Panama.

== Home media ==
Columbia TriStar Home Video released it on VHS in August 1993, LaserDisc in September 1993, on DVD in October 1998 and on Blu-ray in July 2021.

== Reception ==
=== Box office ===
Sniper was held back from release in 1992. It debuted at number two at the box office on January 29, 1993, in 1551 theaters and went on to gross $18,994,653 in the US.

=== Critical response ===
On review aggregator Rotten Tomatoes, it has an approval rating of 36% based on reviews from 14 critics, and an average rating was 4.7/10. On Metacritic it has a score of 45% based on reviews from 19 critics, indicating "mixed or average" reviews.

Roger Ebert rated it 3 out 4 stars and wrote, "Sniper expresses a cool competence that is a pleasure to watch. It isn't a particularly original film, but what it does, it does well." Variety called it "an expertly directed, yet ultimately unsatisfying psychological thriller" that is "undermined by underdeveloped characters and pedestrian dialogue." Vincent Canby of The New York Times described it as "partly a badly choreographed action drama and partly a psychological exploration of Beckett's mind, which comes up empty."

Michael Wilmington of the Los Angeles Times called it a shallow film that does not explore the themes suggested by the script and instead turns into a bloodless, macho video game. Clifford Terry of the Chicago Tribune called it a formulaic male-bonding drama that features a Hollywood odd-coupling. Richard Harrington of The Washington Post criticized the lack of character progression and the implausible conclusion.

Stephen Wigler of The Baltimore Sun called it a "poorly written, badly directed film" that substitutes violence for sex. Marjorie Baumgarten of the Austin Chronicle rated it 3.5/5 stars and wrote, "Sniper does little that's terribly original but that which it does, it does with great competence and grace."

== Sequels ==
Sniper has spawned eleven sequels, mostly released as direct-to-video films. Both Berenger and Zane have sporadically reprised their roles. Since 2011's Sniper: Reloaded, the main protagonist of the franchise has been Beckett's son Brandon, played by Chad Michael Collins.
