= Craig R. Baxley =

American actor

- Born: Craig Redding Baxley; October 20, 1949 (age 76); Los Angeles, California, U.S.
- Occupations: Director; author; stunt coordinator; stunt performer; actor
- Years active: 1971–present

Craig Redding Baxley (born October 20, 1949) is an American award winning director, author, stunt coordinator, stunt performer, and occasional actor. He is best known for his work in the action and thriller genres.

Beginning his career as a stunt performer, he was hired to perform stunts in number of notable television series namely Police Story, Harry O, Rich Man, Poor Man Book II, Gemini Man, Roots and M*A*S*H. He worked as stunt coordinator and second unit director on The Dukes of Hazzard and The A-Team (on which he later made his directorial debut), along with the pilot of Hunter as second unit director. He was stunt coordinator on the feature films The Warriors (1979) and The Long Riders (1980), as well as second unit director on Reds (1981) and Predator (1987).

Baxley also appeared in eight episodes of Kolchak: The Night Stalker, as well having small roles in Chase, Mannix, Bearcats!, Marcus Welby, M.D. and S.W.A.T.

He also was chosen for a driving duel with Remy Julienne in 1975. Craig drove the La Car, Remy drove the Renault.

Appears as the splashless diver on the inner sleeve of the Pink Floyd's album "Wish You Were Here".

In 1988, he made his feature film directorial debut with Action Jackson. His other feature film credits are I Come in Peace (1990), Stone Cold (1991) and Sniper 2 (2002).

Baxley's other television directing credits include miniseries based on Stephen King works namely Storm of the Century (1999), Rose Red (2002), The Diary of Ellen Rimbauer (2003), Kingdom Hospital (2004), as well as The Triangle (2005) and The Lost Room (2006). Some of his television film credits include A Family Torn Apart (1993), Twisted Desire (1996) and Silencing Mary (1998) both starring Melissa Joan Hart.

To date he had Published his Memoir 'Driven by Craig R. Baxley, a Novella 'Five Hours' and the Novels 'Last Exit to Hell' and 'Scalp Dance'

Baxley has worked with Stephen King, directing several television miniseries adapted from or written by King.
