= Best of the Best (1989 film) =

1989 American martial arts film

- Theatrical release poster
- Directed by: Bob Radler
- Written by: Paul Levine
- Story by: Phillip Rhee; Paul Levine
- Produced by: Phillip Rhee; Peter E. Strauss
- Starring: Eric Roberts; James Earl Jones; Sally Kirkland; Phillip Rhee; John P. Ryan; John Dye; David Agresta; Tom Everett; Louise Fletcher; Simon Rhee; Christopher Penn
- Cinematography: Douglas Ryan
- Edited by: William Hoy
- Music by: Paul Gilman
- Production companies: The Movie Group; SVS, Inc. Kuys Entertainment
- Distributed by: Taurus Entertainment
- Release date: November 10, 1989
- Running time: 97 minutes
- Country: United States
- Language: English
- Budget: $5 million
- Box office: $14.1 million

Best of the Best is a 1989 American sports film directed by Robert Radler, and produced by Phillip Rhee, who also co-wrote the story and co-stars in the film. The film starred Eric Roberts, James Earl Jones, Sally Kirkland, Simon Rhee and Chris Penn.

The plot revolves around a team of American martial artists facing a team of South Korean martial artists in a tournament. The film explores themes such as moral conflicts, the power of the human spirit triumphing over adversity and the meaning of life.

Set and filmed in Los Angeles, California, and Seoul, South Korea, between February 13 and April 6, 1989, Best of the Best was released on November 10, 1989.

The film has spawned three sequels: Best of the Best II (1993), Best of the Best 3: No Turning Back (1995), and Best of the Best 4: Without Warning (1998). Phillip Rhee portrays Tommy Lee in all four films, produced all of them, directed the third and fourth films, and co-wrote the first and fourth films.

== Plot ==
Alexander Grady, an auto plant welder and a widowed father from Portland, Oregon, is selected for the United States of America in an international martial arts tournament against Team South Korea. A former competitive martial artist, he suffered a shoulder injury three years prior that ended his career. Also chosen for the team are Tommy Lee, a martial arts instructor from Fresno, California; Travis Brickley, a brash fighter with a short fuse from Miami, Florida; Virgil Keller, a devout Buddhist from Providence, Rhode Island; and Sonny Grasso, a streetwise fighter from Detroit, Michigan. Despite being coached by veteran trainer Frank Couzo, the team faces a difficult challenge. The Koreans have trained all year long, enjoying financial support from their nation, and on at least one occasion, killed a competitor in the ring.

As training begins, the team struggles to bond as Travis antagonizes them. Given the pressure, the American team hires a second assistant coach, Catherine Wade, whose spiritual approach to training clashes with Couzo's more rigorous coaching techniques. Tommy is disturbed when his opponent is revealed to be Dae Han Park, Team Korea's best fighter and veteran martial artist who was responsible for killing Tommy's brother David Lee in a similar tournament. Couzo hopes that Tommy's desire for revenge will give him the necessary aggression to win, while Wade is more concerned about Tommy's mental state. With time and training, the team begins to bond and to earn each other's respect.

Couzo cuts Alex from the team when he breaks the rigid training regimen to visit his son, who had been hit by a car; later, Tommy quits after knocking out Virgil with a powerful spinning side kick during practice. Conflicted by his desire for revenge, Tommy confesses to Alex his fear of fighting Dae Han, but Alex strongly urges him to do the right thing and face his brother's killer. Travis and the others persuade Couzo to reinstate Alex, and Tommy eventually rejoins the team after a change of heart.

In the first two matches of the tournament, Sonny and Virgil are out-classed by their Korean opponents Yung Kim and Han Cho. Travis does his best to psych up the team with his brash attitude, going point for point with his Korean counterpart Tung Sung Moon, but gets beaten in a tie-breaker brick-breaking competition. Alex dominates his match with his opponent, Sae Jin Kwon, but takes a devastating axe-kick to his shoulder which dislocates it. Instead of giving up, he implores Tommy to "pop" the shoulder back into place and resumes the fight, ultimately defeating his opponent with one arm and winning the match. Finally, Tommy faces Dae Han. After a slow start, Tommy gets the upper hand and delivers a series of blows that force Dae Han solely on the defensive. As the match nears its end, Tommy has brought the American team within two points of victory, and Dae Han can barely stand. Tommy prepares to finish the fight, but knowing that Dae Han would not survive the attack, his coaches and teammates dissuade him. Tommy hesitates and lets the clock run out, saving the man's life but forfeiting the overall victory. Couzo consoles Tommy afterward, telling him, "You won that match. Don't ever forget that."

At the medal ceremony, Dae Han unexpectedly approaches Tommy and praises him for his honorable act. He tearfully apologizes for the death of Tommy's brother, and in return offers himself as a brother. Tommy accepts, and Dae Han places his medal around Tommy's neck before the two men embrace. Sae Jin Kwon then walks up to Alex and states his long-time admiration for him as a fighter, before also handing over his medal. The other members of Team Korea then follow suit, awarding their medals to their respective American opponents.

== Cast ==
- Eric Roberts as Alex Grady
- James Earl Jones as Coach Frank Couzo
- Phillip Rhee as Tommy Lee
- Chris Penn as Travis Brickley
- John Dye as Virgil Keller
- David Agresta as Sonny Grasso
- Tom Everett as Assistant Coach Don Peterson
- Sally Kirkland as Catherine Wade
- John P. Ryan as Jennings
- Louise Fletcher as Mrs. Grady, Alex's Mother
- Edan Gross as Walter Grady, Alex's Son
- Hee Il Cho as Korean Coach
- Simon Rhee as Dae Han Park
- James Lew as Sae Jin Kwon
- Ken Nagayama as Yung Kim
- Ahmad Rashad as Broadcaster
- Kane Hodder as Burt
- Edward Bunker as Stan
- Ho Sik Pak as Han Cho
- Dae Kyu Chang as Tung Sung Moon
- Emilie Hagen as Baby Walter, Alex's Son
- Melanie Kinnaman as The Woman

== Music ==
=== Soundtrack ===
Best of the Best

Soundtrack album by Various Artists
- Released: 1989
- Genres: Rock, Pop
- Length: 35:40
- Label: Relativity Records

Originally released as a vinyl record album, cassette and CD, re-released on CD in 2004.

1. Tales of Power – Jim Capaldi (3:32)
2. Best of the Best – Stubblefield & Hall (4:12)
3. American Hotel – Kirsten Nash (4:14)
4. Something so Strong – Jim Capaldi (4:34)
5. The Devil Made Me Do It – Golden Earring (3:18)
6. Radar Love (live) – Golden Earring (4:00)
7. Backroads – Charlie Major (4:03)
8. Original Score Medley – Paul Gilman (4:11)
9. Someday I'm Gonna Ride in a Cadillac – Charlie Major (3:36)

== Reception ==
=== Critical response ===
The film received negative reviews from critics, although it inspired several sequels and has gained a cult following over the years. On Metacritic, the film has a weighted average score of 26 out of 100, based on seven critics, indicating "generally unfavorable" reviews. In his book Iceman: My Fighting Life, UFC champion Chuck Liddell cites Best of the Best as his "personal favorite martial arts film". Movie historian Leonard Maltin, dismissed the picture as "[y]et another Rocky clone" and "[a]n appalling waste of talent...a top-drawer cast in search of a script".

== Franchise ==
=== Sequel ===
A sequel titled Best of the Best II was released in 1993.

=== Reboot ===
Rhee revealed in a 2015 interview with The Action Elite that he was planning on rebooting the franchise with a new cast and that Rhee would produce the new film.

== In popular culture ==
Best of the Best is twice mentioned in the TV series Cobra Kai. First, in the sixth episode of the fourth season by Devon Lee's character, and also in the fifth episode of the sixth season by Johnny Lawrence (during a lesson to his students at Miyagi Do).

It is mentioned in season 2, episode 4 of Eastbound and Down by Danny McBride's character Kenny Powers when he is ridiculing the owner of his minor league Mexican baseball team for not knowing who Eric Roberts is.
