= Shirō Saitō =

Japanese actor (born 1956)

- 斎藤 志郎
- Born: Shirō Shima; August 31, 1956 (age 70); Sakata, Yamagata, Japan
- Education: Toyo University
- Occupations: Actor; voice actor
- Years active: 1981–present
- Agent: Bungakuza
- Notable work: Bleach as Yoruichi Shihōin (cat form)
- Website: Official profile

Shirō Saitō (斎藤 志郎, Saitō Shirō; born August 31, 1956) is a Japanese actor and voice actor from Sakata, Yamagata, Japan.

== Filmography ==
=== Anime ===
Year	Series	Role	Notes	Source
1997	Sakura Wars	Jean Leo		
1998	Neo Ranga	President		
2002; 2011	Case Closed	Funato Mitsuaki; Katayose Ogihito		
2002	Saikano	Soldier B		
2002	Heat Guy J	Factory owner		
2002	Pecola	Bug		
2003	Detective School Q	Masahiko Takase, Heiji Odajima		
2004	Saiyuki Reload Gunlock	Store manager		
2004	Monster	Boss		
2004	Gankutsuou: The Count of Monte Cristo	Captain Ekurēru		
2004	Yakitate!! Japan	Ryū Ryoman		
2004	Major	Dr. Sawamura		
2004	Inuyasha	Hōsenki II		
2005	Bleach	Yoruichi Shihōin (cat form)		
2005	Gallery Fake	Hō		
2005	Oku-sama wa Mahō Shōjo: Bewitched Agnes	Shoichi Kodama		
2005	Play Ball	Okamoto		
2005	Hell Girl	Fukumoto		
2005	Viewtiful Joe	Blocky		
2005	Ginga Legend Weed	Moss, The Guard Dog		
2006	Amaenaide yo!! Katsu!!	Dr. Yurei		
2006	Humanoid Monster Bem	Minotaur		
2006	Gintama	Nomi-san		
2006	Black Lagoon	Bao		
2006	Musashi Gundoh	Ryōgen		
2006	Flag	Naraya Johoya		
2006	Powerpuff Girls Z	Fuzzy Lumpkins		
2006	Artificial insect Kabuto Borg Victory by Victory	Pluto		
2007	Claymore	Innkeeper		
2007	Blue Dragon	Nene		
2007	Moribito: Guardian of the Spirit	Captain		
2007	Armored Trooper Votoms: Pailsen Files	Naraya Platoon Leader		
2007	Kekkaishi	Mamezo		
2007	MapleStory	Bartol		
2008	Yatterman		Second series	
2008	Kamen no Maid Guy	Sakanamatsu		
2009	Tegami Bachi	Frank		
2009	Sōten Kōro	Old man		
2010	Cobra the Animation	Bacchus		
2010	Mobile Suit Gundam Unicorn	Jonah Gibney		
2010	Petit Vampire	Claude		
2011	Lupin the Third: Blood Seal - Eternal Mermaid	Kageura		
2011	Fairy Tail	Bluenote Stinger		
2011	Toriko	Colonel Mokkoi		
2012	Gon	Don		
2012	Sankarea	Jogorō Furuya		
2012	Tsuritama	Ho		
2012	Kingdom	Hyoko		
2012	Ghost in the Shell: Stand Alone Complex	Kanekichi Gondo		
2012	Sword Art Online	Nishida		
2013	Gatchaman Crowds	Takao Kuwabara		
2014	One Piece	Dagama		
2014	Log Horizon 2	Papusu		
2015	The Heroic Legend of Arslan	Bodan		
2015	Gatchaman Crowds insight	Yu Misudachi		
2015	Dragon Ball Super	Sorbet		
2017	Altair: A Record of Battles	Yağ Uzun		
2018	Megalobox	Gansaku Nanbu		
2018	Angolmois: Record of Mongol Invasion	Chōminpuku		
2021	Megalobox 2: Nomad	Gansaku Nanbu		
2022	Sabikui Bisco	Jabi		
2022	Overlord IV	Vesture Kloff Di Laufen		
2023	Ragna Crimson	Garm Ulban		

=== Feature films ===
Year	Series	Role	Notes	Source
1997	Princess Mononoke	Cattleman		
1999	Gundress	Bob Riley		
2001	Spirited Away	Additional voices		
2005	Saint Seiya The Hades Chapter - Inferno 9	Acheron Charon		
2008	Ponyo	Additional voices		
2009	Professor Layton and the Eternal Diva	Inspector Chelmey		
2015	Dragon Ball Z: Resurrection 'F'	Sorbet		
2022	One Piece Film: Red	Rockstar		
2024	My Oni Girl	Naoya Yamashita		

=== Video games ===
Year	Series	Role	Notes	Source
2004	Inuyasha: The Secret of the Cursed Mask	Kakuju	PS2	
	Final Fantasy XII	Migelo		
	Granblue Fantasy	Grand Duke Zaka	game	
	Professor Layton series	Inspector Chelmey		

=== Overseas dubbing ===
==== Live-action ====
Series	Role	Voice dub for (Note: Live-action actors that Saito has dubbed for are listed if explicitly mentioned on his resume or on related media)	Source
Armageddon	Lev Andropov	Peter Stormare	
Birth	Clifford	Peter Stormare	
The Brothers Grimm	Kavuradi	Peter Stormare	
Kill 'Em All	CIA Agent Holman	Peter Stormare	
Kill 'Em All 2	CIA Agent Holman	Peter Stormare	
A Good Day to Die Hard	Cabbie	Pasha D. Lychnikoff	
A Series of Unfortunate Events	Arthur Poe	K. Todd Freeman	
A Young Doctor's Notebook	Demyan Lukich	Adam Godley	
Aquaman	Brine King	John Rhys-Davies	
Back to the Future film series	Biff Tannen	Thomas F. Wilson	
Beethoven Virus	Mayor Kan		
Biker Boyz	Motherland	Djimon Hounsou	
Birds of Prey	Captain Patrick Erickson	Steven Williams	
Blade	Quinn	Donal Logue	
Blow	Fred Jung	Ray Liotta	
Blue Thunder	Captain Jack Braddock	Warren Oates	
Borat	Azamat Bagatov	Ken Davitian	
Boy Meets World	Chet Hunter		
Bringing Down the House	Howie Rottman	Eugene Levy	
Broken Arrow	Kelly	Howie Long	
Case 39	Mike Vernon	Ian McShane	
Charlie's Angels: Full Throttle	Alan Caufield	Eric Bogosian	
Children of Heaven	Ali's father	Amil Nagy	
Clash of the Titans	Ozal	Ashraf Barhom	
Cold Case season 7	Det. Eddie Saccardo		
Dharma & Greg	Myron Lawrence "Larry" Finkelstein	Alan Rachins	
Duets	Ricky Dean	Huey Lewis	
Eastern Promises	Stepan	Jerzy Skolimowski	
Eddie the Eagle	Terry Edwards	Keith Allen	
Elysium	Agent C.M. Kruger	Sharlto Copley	
Empress Ki	Pegan	Kim Young-Ho	
Five Fingers	Gavin	Colm Meaney	
Game Change	Steve Schmidt	Woody Harrelson	
Goosebumps	Uncle Al	Chris Benson	
Half Past Dead	El Fuego	Tony Plana	
Harry's Law	Judge Garcia	Tony Plana	
Harry Potter and the Philosopher's Stone	Rubeus Hagrid	Robbie Coltrane	
Harry Potter and the Chamber of Secrets	Rubeus Hagrid	Robbie Coltrane	
Harry Potter and the Prisoner of Azkaban	Rubeus Hagrid	Robbie Coltrane	
Harry Potter and the Goblet of Fire	Rubeus Hagrid	Robbie Coltrane	
Harry Potter and the Order of the Phoenix	Rubeus Hagrid	Robbie Coltrane	
Harry Potter and the Half-Blood Prince	Rubeus Hagrid	Robbie Coltrane	
Harry Potter and the Deathly Hallows – Part 1	Rubeus Hagrid	Robbie Coltrane	
Harry Potter and the Deathly Hallows – Part 2	Rubeus Hagrid	Robbie Coltrane	
Hawaii Five-0	Matt	Dane Cook	
Heroes series	Arthur Petrelli		
Home Alone 3	Earl Unger	David Thornton	
I Know What You Did Last Summer series	Benjamin Willis	Muse Watson	
Joker: Folie à Deux	Jackie Sullivan	Brendan Gleeson	
Jumong	Chesa	Cha Kwag-Su	
Kick-Ass	Frank D'Amico	Mark Strong	
Kindergarten Cop	Henry Shoop	Bob Nelson; 1995 TV Asahi edition	
King Arthur	Bors	Ray Winston	
Larry Crowne	Lamar	Cedric the Entertainer	
Lassie	Rowlie	Peter Dinklage	
Layer Cake	Duke	Jamie Foreman	
Life Is Beautiful	Bartolomeo	Pietro Desilva; 2001 TV Asahi edition	
Mad Max: Fury Road	Corpus Colossus	Quentin Kenihan	
Mad Max: Fury Road	The People Eater	John Howard; 2019 THE CINEMA edition	
Mission: Impossible III	Bishop	Bruce French	
Murphy Brown	Eldin Bernecky	Robert Pastorelli	
Night at the Museum: Battle of the Smithsonian	Ivan IV of Russia	Christopher Guest	
Nightmare Alley	Major Mosquito	Mark Povinelli	
Nixon	J. Edgar Hoover	Bob Hoskins	
Notting Hill	Max	Tim McInnerny	
Pirates of the Caribbean film series	Jimmy Legs	Christopher Adamson	
Planet of the Apes	Limbo	Paul Giamatti; 2005 NTV edition	
Power Rangers Lost Galaxy	Villamax		
Punisher: War Zone	Billy	Dominic West	
Replicant	Jake Riley	Michael Rooker	
Rocky Balboa	Mason Dixon	Antonio Tarver	
Ruby Sparks	Mort	Antonio Banderas	
Scary Movie series	Mahariku	Anthony Anderson	
Seinfeld	Kramer	Michael Richards	
Seven Years in Tibet	Regent	Danny Denzongpa	
Shaolin Soccer	Senpuchido	Forest	
Snatch	Boris "The Blade" Yurinov	Rade Šerbedžija	
Speed	Sam	Hawthorne James	
Spell	Earl	John Beasley	
Spider-Man series	Carradine	Michael Papajohn	
Tears of the Sun	Ellis "Zee" Pettigrew	Eamonn Walker	
Terry Pratchett's The Colour of Magic	Death	Christopher Lee	
The Dark Knight	Chechen Boss	Ritchie Coster	
The Devil's Advocate	Eddie Barzoon	Jeffrey Jones	
The Fifth Element	President Lindberg	Tom Lister Jr.	
The Green Hornet	Michael Axeford	Edward James Olmos	
The Green Mile	Toot-Toot	Harry Dean Stanton	
The Guns of Navarone	Brown	Stanley Baker	
The Hobbit: An Unexpected Journey	William	Peter Hambleton	
The Limits of Control	Lone Man	Isaach de Bankolé	
The Lord of the Rings: The Fellowship of the Ring	Farmer Maggot	Cameron Rhodes	
The Matrix Reloaded	Agent Thompson	Matt McColm	
The Matrix Revolutions	Trainman		
The Medallion	Commander Hammerstock-Smythe	John Rhys-Davies	
The Mothman Prophecies	Gordon Smallwood	Will Patton	
The Mummy Returns	Spivey	Tom Fisher	
The Patriot	John Billings	Leon Rippy	
The Princess' Man	Ming Shing		
Titanic	Joseph Bell	Terry Forrestal	
The SpongeBob Movie: Sponge Out of Water	Burger-Beard the Pirate	Antonio Banderas	
Tomorrow Never Dies	Sergeant	Al Matthews	
Transformers: Dark of the Moon	Brains Officer	Reno Wilson	
Transformers: Age of Extinction	Brains	Reno Wilson	
Turbulence	Stubbs	Brendan Gleeson	
Ugly Betty	Ignacio Suarez	Tony Plana	
Vacancy 2: The First Cut	Smith	Scott G. Anderson	
Van Helsing	Igor	Kevin J. O'Connor	
Violet & Daisy	Michael	James Gandolfini	
War	Benny	Luis Guzman	
White Collar	Jeffries	Ernie Hudson	
Zombie Strippers	Paco	Joey Medina	

==== Animation ====
Series	Role	Notes	Source
Adventure Time	Jake		
American Dragon: Jake Long	Fu Dog		
Brandy & Mr. Whiskers	Mr. Cantarious		
Buzz Lightyear of Star Command	Torque		
Chuggington	Dunbar		
Cloudy with a Chance of Meatballs	Tim		
Coraline	Bobinski		
Finding Nemo	Jacques		
Finding Dory	Jacques		
Hotel Transylvania	Suit of Armor		
The Incredibles	Frozone / Lucius Best		
Incredibles 2	Frozone / Lucius Best		
Legend of the Guardians: The Owls of Ga'Hoole	Gurinburu		
The Lost 15 Boys: The Big Adventure on Pirates' Island	Kyivu		
Monsters, Inc.	Sushi Chef, Pete "Claws" Ward		
The Powerpuff Girls	Captain Crack McCraigen		
The Penguins of Madagascar	Hans		
Puss in Boots	Mamenoki		
The Queen's Corgi	Duke		
Rango	Rock Eye		
Rio	Marcel		
Robinson Crusoe	Mel		
Star Wars: The Clone Wars	Dogi Routh, Coburn Admiral, Lagon		
Spider-Man and His Amazing Friends	Beetle		
Super Robot Monkey Team Hyper Force GO!	Mandarin		
Surf's Up 2: WaveMania	Mr. McMahon		
Teenage Mutant Ninja Turtles	Vic, Spider		
Tom and Jerry: Shiver Me Whiskers	Red Pirate Ron, Blue Pirate Bob, Purple Parrot Chuck		

==== Tokusatsu ====
Series	Role	Notes	Source
1991	Super Rescue Solbrain	Jun Tashiro	Ep. 3
1992	Special Rescue Exceedraft	Dr. Inagaki	Ep. 39
