= Rafael Primorac =

Croatian film producer (born 1954)

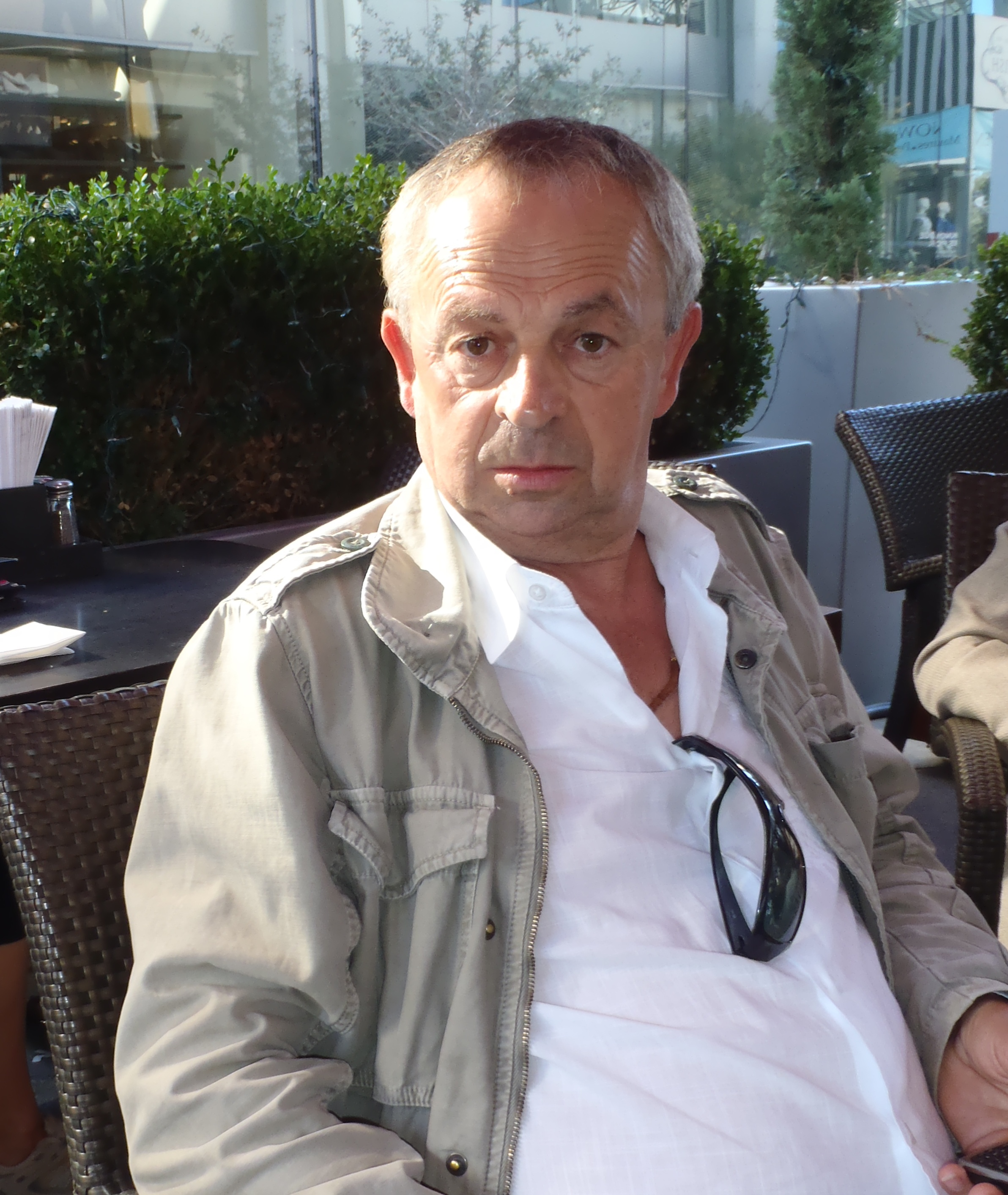
- Rafael Primorac
- Born: 11 May 1954 (age 72); Vrgorac, PR Croatia, FPR Yugoslavia
- Education: Academy of Dramatic Art, University of Zagreb
- Occupation: producer
- Years active: 1975–present

Rafael Primorac (born 11 May 1954) is a Croatian film producer, who lives and works in the United States. He studied film at the Academy of Dramatic Art, University of Zagreb, Croatia. Primorac entered the world of film production in 1975 as a PA in Cross of Iron, directed by the legendary Sam Peckinpah, starring James Coburn. He, later, worked for Jadran Film in Zagreb as a Location Manager, First AD, Production Manager, Line Producer and Head of International Co-productions. Primorac moved to Los Angeles in 1986 and worked in production and distribution. He produced Quicksand starring Michael Dudikoff and Giallo starring Adrien Brody. With his company Arramis Films, he produced Ultimate Force starring Mirko Filipović, Game of Death starring Wesley Snipes, Mysteria starring Billy Zane, Danny Glover and Martin Landau, as well as Perfect Weapon with Steven Seagal, Kill 'Em All with Jean-Claude Van Damme, and Seized with Scott Adkins.

== Filmography ==
Year	Film	Role	Notes
2002	Quicksand	Producer	starring Michael Dudikoff
2005	Ultimate Force	Producer	starring Mirko Filipović - Cro Cop
2009	Giallo	Producer	starring Adrien Brody
2010	Game of Death	Producer	starring Wesley Snipes
2011	Mysteria	Producer	starring Robert Miano, Billy Zane, Danny Glover, Meadow Williams and Martin Landau
2014	Being American	Co-Producer	starring Christopher McDonald, Sienna Guillory, Lorenzo Lamas, Caitlin Carmichael and Robert Miano
2016	The Perfect Weapon	Producer	starring Steven Seagal, Johnny Messner, Richard Tyson, Vernon Wells and Sasha Jackson
2017	Kill'em All	Producer	starring Jean-Claude Van Damme, Autumn Reeser, Peter Stormare, Maria Conchita Alonso and Daniel Bernhardt
2019	Seized	Producer	starring Scott Adkins, Mario van Peebles, Matthew Garbacz
2019	Masks Don't Lie	Producer	starring Emmanuelle Vaugier, Anna Hutchison, Jayne Wisener, Cassandra Gava and Ángela Molina
