= Underdog Kids =

- Directed by: Phillip Rhee
- Written by: Phillip Rhee
- Produced by: Phillip Rhee, Douglas Magallon, Fabienne Wen
- Starring: Phillip Rhee; Tom Arnold; Max Gail; Patrick Fabian; Adam Irigoyen; Ryan Potter; Beau Bridges
- Cinematography: Aaron Meister
- Edited by: Terence Their
- Music by: Arturo Sandoval
- Release date: 7 July 2015
- Running time: 94 minutes
- Country: United States
- Language: English

Underdog Kids is an American martial arts film directed by Phillip Rhee that premiered on July 7, 2015. It is Rhee's first film in seventeen years, after retiring from the industry in 1998 with Best of the Best 4: Without Warning as his last film. Having focused on both teaching and children's programming at the time, Rhee wanted to make a film geared towards kids and family that would be similar to his previous film Best of the Best.

== Plot ==
At the Mid-County Community Center, a coach quits teaching a ragtag team martial arts. Community Center leader Charlie is looking for a new coach when former mixed martial arts champion Jimmy Lee, a protege of Charlie's whose career ended three years earlier after an accident, arrives. Reluctantly, he agrees to teach the group, consisting of Wyatt, Leticia, Raymond, Ricky, and brothers Alex and Sean, until he can work out an MMA comeback. At first, the kids are reluctant to learn from Jimmy and each of them is dealing with issues of their own, including poverty, bullying, desire for approval, and parental loss. However, Jimmy slowly warms up to the kids as he comes to recognize their need for guidance, and as he helps each of them with their issues, they slowly warm to him in return.

When Jimmy and the kids go to their first competition, Jimmy runs into his old childhood rival, Ted Barrett, who is the coach of the three-time national karate champions, the Beverly Hills Scorpions. Ted has held a grudge against Jimmy since they were young, and uses his current fame to influence others, despite the objections of his own son Eric. When the kids are humiliated, Jimmy decides to find a sponsor to help them. However, Ted uses his influence to slander Jimmy's name and have him blacklisted from every potential sponsor. Just when Jimmy is about to give up, old friend and food truck owner Big Mama decides to sponsor him. However, to get the sponsorship, Jimmy goes to the next competition dressed up as a hot dog, furthering the humiliation of the kids. When the kids learn Jimmy got them a sponsor, they are happy until they learn they will be known as the "Underdogs". When Big Mama tells the kids what Jimmy had gone through to get them sponsored and that no one else would take them, they finally decide to go along with their new name. As the team begins to train hard, Jimmy brings in a new member, the very quiet yet violent-prone Rasheed, whose mother wants him to learn martial arts for self-discipline.

As the kids improve and begin to win, they eventually win a big tournament that will lead them to a showdown with the Scorpions. As they prepare for the showdown, Alex and Sean's aunt Valerie decides to teach the Underdogs ballet to help them with their balance and rhythm. However, several Scorpion members discover the Underdogs at dance school and secretly videotape the class and post the footage to YouTube. The following day, the kids are teased, especially Rasheed, who is revealed to have a speech problem. Rasheed then fights with several of the teasers and gets suspended, but Jimmy visits him at home and after a talk, the two realize they have much in common and come to a mutual understanding. However, Jimmy is finally given an opportunity to return to MMA and must leave the day before the big showdown. After flying out to Las Vegas, he looks over the contract and realizes that MMA is not for him anymore. Jimmy walks away and returns in time for the big showdown between the Underdogs and the Scorpions.

At the competition, both teams battle it out in one-on-one matches with neither side backing down, resulting in a tie between them. After a group kata is announced for the tiebreaker event, the Scorpions' performance scores a 49 with the judges. As the Underdogs prepare for their kata, Ted attempts to sabotage them by short-circuiting their radio and destroying their music, much to Eric's disapproval. However, Jimmy gets Rasheed's brother and his friends to create an a cappella beat, allowing the Underdogs to perform their kata successfully. The Underdogs end up scoring a perfect 50, winning the competition. Afterwards, Eric leads the Scorpions in congratulating the Underdogs and the two teams agree to be friends, while Ted's sponsor severs ties with him (but not the Scorpions) in disgust after having witnessed his act of unsportsmanlike conduct.

== Cast ==
- Phillip Rhee as Jimmy "The Lightning Bolt" Lee
- Tom Arnold as Gene "Geno" Burman, Jimmy's Agent
- Mirelly Taylor as Valerie Cruz
- Max Gail as Charlie Walker
- Ellia English as "Big Mama"
- Ted McGinley as Barry Hershfeld
- Patrick Fabian as Ted Barrett, The Coach of The Scorpions
- Adam Irigoyen as Wyatt Jones
- Ryan Potter as Eric Barrett
- Beau Bridges as Ron Butz
- Lorenz Arnell as Rasheed Shabazz
- Cade Sutton as Raymond Butz
- Rayna Vallandingham as Leticia Hernandez
- Aidan Considine as Alex Michaels
- Nicholas Bechtel as Sean Michaels
- Andrew Franklin as Ricky Perez
- Tyler Weaver as Cameron Hershfeld
- Seth Lee as Jake
- Sean Rhee as Andrew
- Julien Giancana as "Goliath"
- Tonja Kahlens as Martha Butz
- Sebastian Saraceno as "Big Guy"
- Richard Norton as Himself
- Don 'The Dragon' Wilson as Himself
- Dan Inosanto as Himself
- Benny Urquidez as Himself
- Jun Chong as Himself

== Development ==
The film was first announced on August 21, 2013.

Underdog Kids is written, produced and directed by Phillip Rhee. The original title of the film was Underdogs. The first images and posters were released on September 14, 2014, and the film released on July 7, 2015. Rhee was quoted as saying that "By working with an award winning producing and directing partner Doug Magallon and Fabienne Wen, we were able to make 'Underdog Kids' into one of those special films that will touch your heart and uplift your spirits", and that the main reason why the film was made was to "inspire families with stories of courage, friendship, love and honor" and the teach people to "never give up".

Phillip went through over 600 children to find his final cast for Underdog Kids.

Simon Rhee, Phillip's brother served as the stunt consultant and James Lew was the 2nd unit director/stunt coordinator and Marc Canonizado was the choreographer on the film. Arturo Sandoval composed the soundtrack and Jim Bolt worked as the sound mixer and designer.

More images were revealed on the film's official website.

Several well-known martial artists cameo in the film.
