= Pjetër Malota =

Albanian actor (born 1959)

Peter Malota
- Pjetër Malota
- Born: Pjetër Malota Lulgjuraj; 4 July 1959 (age 66); Lovka / Llofka, PR Montenegro, Yugoslavia

Peter Malota (born Pjetër Malota Lulgjuraj; born 4 July 1959 in Lovka / Llofka, Tuzi, Montenegro) is a Montenegrin-Albanian film actor best known for his appearances in films starring Jean-Claude Van Damme. He has over 40 years Tae Kwon Do/Hapkido experience.

== Career ==
In 1984, Malota made his film debut in a small role in Furious and then played a member of a syndicate gang in the action movie Ninja Turf. In 1991, Malota began to work with Van Damme, playing an assassin with kicking skills with knives in his shoes in Double Impact. In Nowhere to Run, he is seen playing the convict Van Damme tries to free, but is killed. In 1996's The Quest, Malota put his kicking skills to use again playing the Spanish fighter who fights Van Damme in the tournament.

Over the past 26 years, Malota has worked as a fight/stunt coordinator on 25 films.

== Filmography ==
- 1984 Furious as Fighter
- 1985 Ninja Turf as Syndicate Gang Member
- 1985 Crime Killer as Imbrochim
- 1991 Double Impact as Bodyguard With Spurs
- 1992 Universal Soldier as Stunt Coordinator
- 1993 Nowhere to Run as Prisoner
- 1996 The Quest as Spanish Fighter
- 1999 Universal Soldier: The Return as Fight Choreographer (uncredited)
- 1999 Desert Heat as Fight Choreographer
- 2001 Replicant as Fight Choreographer (uncredited)
- 2001 The Order as Amnon
- 2006 Honor as Stunt Coordinator
- 2009 The Butterfly Effect 3: Revelations as Assailant in the Park
- 2009 All's Faire in Love as Stunt Coordinator
- 2010 Meet Monica Velour as Stunt Coordinator
- 2010 Trust as Stunt Coordinator
- 2010 Vanishing on 7th Street as Stunt Coordinator
- 2010 Secrets In The Walls as Stunt Coordinator
- 2011 Another Happy Day as Stunt Coordinator
- 2011 Salvation Blvd as Stunt Coordinator
- 2011 Smooch as Stunt Coordinator
- 2011 This Must Be the Place as Stunt Coordinator
- 2012 The Oogieloves In The Big Balloon Adventure as Stunt Coordinator
- 2013 Love and Honor as Stunt Coordinator
- 2013 Highland Park as Stunt Coordinator
- 2016 The Perfect Weapon as Stunt Coordinator
- 2017 Kill 'Em All (directorial debut) as Director
- The Hunted Man as Director
- 2021 Shut Down as Stunt Coordinator
- Chinese Hercules: The Bolo Yeung Story as Himself
