= Jun Chong =

South Korean martial artist and actor

- Born: Jun Chong; 1944 (age 81–82); South Korea
- Occupations: Martial artist; actor; filmmaker

Jun Chong (born 1944) is a South Korean-born martial artist, filmmaker and actor.

== Life and martial arts ==
Chong was born in 1944 on the Korean Peninsula. At age 8, he began training in taekwondo. While he won numerous competitions both nationally and internationally, Chong decided to try his hand at other forms of martial arts including hapkido, judo, aikido and boxing. Chong is a 10th-degree grandmaster in taekwondo. After moving to Los Angeles in the 1970s, he opened a school that he continues to operate alongside his son Yong. He has had celebrity students including Phillip Rhee, Simon Rhee, Lorenzo Lamas, Sam J. Jones, Sugar Ray Leonard, Thomas Ian Griffith and Heather Graham.

Chong is also the founder of the World United Martial Arts Organization (WUMAO), connecting schools from all over the world to support the advancement and growth of martial arts.

== Film career ==
Chong made his film debut in 1976 in a South Korean-made martial arts film shot on location in Los Angeles, Visitor of America, with Chong credited as 케리・郑 (Ke-li Chong) in the original Korean version and as Bruce K.L. Lea in the English-dubbed and altered American edit known as Bruce Lee Fights Back from the Grave. Chong's picture was shown as Kim Sun-Yung of Tang Soo Do, or Dohk Sa, in the 1984 American film The Karate Kid at the Cobra Kai dojo.

In 1985, Chong founded Action Brothers Productions. His first film as a producer and star was L.A. Street Fighters, also known as Ninja Turf. The film included students in the cast members like Bill Wallace and a pre-fame Thomas F. Wilson of the Back to the Future trilogy. His second film, Silent Assassins, had Chong team up with real-life student Sam J. Jones and Linda Blair. The film also had a brief fight scene between real-life brothers Phillip and Simon Rhee, who play a good guy and an assassin, respectively. In 1990, Chong starred, produced and choreographed the fight scenes for Street Soldiers, in which he plays the martial arts teacher of a high school gang who want to take back the streets from a rival and more ruthless gang. The film was the lone Hollywood film with master kicker Hwang Jang-Lee, who fought Chong in the film. Afterward, Chong took a 15-year hiatus from movies to focus on teaching.

Chong returned in 2006 in the role of Master Chong in the mixed martial arts film Maximum Cage Fighting, which was also produced by Action Brothers. In 2015, he made a cameo as himself in the comeback film for Phillip Rhee, Underdog Kids as a judge alongside fellow martial arts greats Richard Norton, Don Wilson, Benny Urquidez and Dan Inosanto.
