= Seized (2020 film) =

- Theatrical release poster
- Directed by: Isaac Florentine
- Written by: Rico Lowry
- Produced by: Rafael Primorac; Elias Axume
- Starring: Scott Adkins; Mario Van Peebles
- Cinematography: Ivan Vastov
- Edited by: Alain Jakubowicz
- Music by: Corey Allen Jackson
- Production companies: Premiere Entertainment Group; Arramis Films
- Distributed by: Lionsgate Home Entertainment
- Release date: October 13, 2020 (United States)
- Running time: 85 minutes
- Country: United States
- Languages: English; Spanish
- Budget: $3 Million
- Box office: $46,191

Seized is a 2020 American action thriller film directed by Isaac Florentine. The film stars Scott Adkins and Mario Van Peebles and follows the former special agent who must eliminate three crime syndicates of highly skilled criminals in exchange for his son who is kidnapped.

== Plot ==
Former special forces agent Nero, has moved to a beachside in Rosarito Beach in Baja California with his son Taylor. His wife died some time ago. One day, Nero is shot by a dart gun and as he awakens, he finds that his son has been kidnapped. He receives a call from unknown man that sends him live footage of his son being held inside a truck, equipped with a tube connecting to the exhaust pipe. In order to see his son again, the man tasks him with eliminating assassins of every dangerous crime syndicates of highly skilled criminals. The man has provided him a vest equipped with body cam, weapons, and a bulletproof Chevrolet Suburban.

With the body cam, the man – later identified as Mzamo – along with his lover Alanza, his fellow cartel members, and a few corrupt intelligence agents led by their leader Donovan, are able to observe his activities. On his first task, Nero infiltrates a restaurant occupied by Roja and the Garza Cartel; he kills every one of them. After finishing the first task, Mzamo gives him the second target: Eliazar Machado, who is notorious for prostitution, racketeering, kidnapping and bombing. Nero infiltrates a prostitution den run by Machado, where he fights Machado's men before killing Machado himself. When Mzamo allows Nero to speak to his son, Nero tells him that he used to work for an intelligence agency and that name "Nero" is actually his cover name; his wife was kidnapped after someone within the agency betrayed him and blew his cover; she was killed afterwards. Nero tracked and killed the people responsible for his wife's murder, afterwards the agency took him off duty and moved him with son down to Mexico for safety. Nero vows to find the man behind the plot once the given task is accomplished. Through the conversation with Mzamo, it is revealed that Donovan was the one who betrayed Nero and moved him and Taylor to Mexico; due to his combat skills, Donovan had planned to use Nero to eliminate crime to eliminate Mzamo's rival organization.

Mzamo gives him a third target which is Omar Chavez – an arms dealer and a personal rival of Mzamo – who is already aware the events of Roja, the Garza Cartel, and Machado. Nero infiltrates Chavez's estate where he eliminates some of the latter's men, but Chavez shoots Nero and destroys the body cam. Presumed that Nero is killed, Mzamo deploys his men to finish them. Nero is interrogated by Chavez, who also shows him the live CCTV footage of his son; Nero explains about his mission for the sake of his son's life and Chavez tells the whereabouts of Taylor. As Chavez about to kill Nero, Mzamo's men arrives and the gunfight erupts between Chavez's men. Nero gains the upper hand, kills Chavez and drives to Mzamo's estate.

Certain that Nero is dead, Donovan persuades Mzamo to give him a truck key to kill Taylor by releasing the carbon monoxide into the van, but they discover that the boy had escaped; Mzamo moved him somewhere else safe, realizing that the agents are planning to kill the boy. Nero arrives at the estate and kills Donovan for the connection of killing his wife. Nero kills the remaining agents while Mzamo and Alanza also kill the agents who turned against them. Mzamo releases Taylor, who reunites with Nero. Mzamo makes an agreement with Nero to allow them to live peacefully but the latter is confident that the remnants of the cartel will hunt them down and promises that he will go after Mzamo if he ever sees his face again. Nero and Taylor drive away on Mzamo's motorcycle.

== Cast ==
- Scott Adkins as Nero
- Mario Van Peebles as Mzamo
- James P. Bennett as Walker
- Stephen Elder as Donovan
- Karlee Perez as Alanza
- David Fernandez Jr. as Hugo
- Matthew Garbacz as Taylor
- Rolando Gonzalez as Eliazar Machado
- Luis Gatica as Omar Chavez
- Uriah Hall as Unnamed Special Forces Member

== Production ==
In early press releases for the film, it was stated the Adkins' character would be named "Carl Rizk", with "Rizk" also being the working title for the film. He was also to have 2 children instead of one, one son and one daughter, living in a small town in Oregon. Another difference in the plot was the children were to be buried alive with enough oxygen to last five hours, with Adkins having to take out three mob groups, each increasingly more dangerous than the last, within that timeframe. These were changed for unknown reasons.

== Reception ==
On review aggregator Rotten Tomatoes, the film holds a 40% approval rating based on 5 reviews, with an average score of 4.3/10.

Dysan Aufar of Screen Anarchy praised Florentine's "fluid cameraworks and Adkins's movements" for building up the "highly amusing videogame-like beat 'em up brutality" throughout the film and Van Peebles' "adept" portrayal of Mzamo, concluding that: "Seized provides a delightful mindless spectacle segmented to those who seek the pleasure of adrenaline rush. Florentine doesn't bother to outdo his previous films, though it ends up being as enjoyable as his other collaborations with Adkins." Leslie Felperin of The Guardian called it a "rote actioner" with a "standard issue, computer-game narrative" that's occasionally saved by the "satirical wit" throughout the dialogue and Adkins being "credibly pugilistic" during the fight scenes.
