= Game of Death (2010 film) =

- Official DVD cover
- Directed by: Giorgio Serafini
- Written by: Jim Agnew; Megan Brown
- Produced by: Billy Dietrich; Philippe Martinez; Rafael Primorac
- Starring: Wesley Snipes; Zoë Bell; Gary Daniels; Robert Davi
- Cinematography: Erik Curtis
- Edited by: Kevin Budzynski; Todd C. Ramsay
- Music by: Jesse Voccia
- Production companies: Stage 6 Films; Voltage Pictures
- Distributed by: Sony Pictures Home Entertainment
- Release dates: November 27, 2010 (Japan); February 15, 2011 (United States)
- Running time: 96 minutes
- Country: United States
- Language: English
- Budget: $13 million
- Box office: $189,805 (Middle East)

Game of Death is a 2010 American action film directed by Giorgio Serafini, and starring Wesley Snipes, Zoë Bell, Gary Daniels and Robert Davi. The film was released on direct-to-DVD in the United States on February 15, 2011.

== Plot ==
The story is told in flashback. CIA agent Marcus Jones recounts his final mission in the form of a confession to a Catholic priest. The mission begins when Jones's mentor in the CIA, Dietrich, informs him that his next assignment is to gather intelligence for the possible prosecution of American citizens Frank Smith, an arms dealer, and John Redvale, a hedge fund manager. Jones succeeds in being hired as Smith's bodyguard and accompanies Smith to the Redvale building, where Smith is supposed to obtain $100 million in cash. Unknown assailants attack the vehicle in which Smith and Jones are travelling. While Jones is distracted, Dietrich, flying above them in a helicopter with several other CIA agents, discovers that the others are traitors when they kill him. They are after the $100 million.

Jones and Smith survive the attack partly because Smith has a heart attack just as it begins. The driver is killed; Jones takes the wheel, loses the killers, and drives Smith to Detroit Medical Center, where he is provided with lifesaving care. The CIA traitors show up and begin killing hospital staff. Jones, the primary target of the killers, eludes them and manages to take several of them out until Floria takes him prisoner and takes him to new team leader Zander. However, Jones is knocked unconscious and left to take the blame for deaths, while Smith is taken, along with a doctor to meet Redvale so that the killers can get his $100 million.

Redvale decides the best course of action is to let the killers have the money, then hunt them down and kill them many years later. Meanwhile, Jones steals an ambulance and drives to Redvale's building to save the doctor and eliminate his former team members. Accomplishing both of these missions, Jones then eludes scores of Detroit Police Department officers and escapes with a bag which contains approximately $25 million. As Jones leaves the cathedral and the priest to whom he made confession, he leaves the bag behind. Walking past the basketball court, a young man tosses a basketball to him, which reminds Jones that he is forgiven.

== Cast ==
- Wesley Snipes as Agent Marcus Jones
- Aunjanue Ellis as Rachel
- Zoë Bell as Floria
- Ernie Hudson as Clarence
- Quinn Duffy as John Redvale
- Gary Daniels as Zander
- Robert Davi as Frank Smith
- Ron Balicki as Jimmy

== Production ==
Game of Death's original director was Abel Ferrara, for whom Snipes had appeared previously in King of New York. Ferrara left the project during filming, however, and Serafini replaced him. The reasons for Ferrara's departure were never divulged, and how much, if any, of his footage remains in the finished film is not publicly known.

== Release ==
The film was released in the United States on direct-to-DVD. Sony released the film in Japan on November 27, 2010, and in the United States February 15, 2011, where it grossed $4.3 million in video sales. Optimum Home Entertainment released it in the United Kingdom on 21 February 2011.

== Reception ==
On the review aggregator website Rotten Tomatoes, the film holds an approval rating of 46% based on 13 reviews, with an average rating of 2.5/5. Ian Jane of DVD Talk rated it 2.5/5 stars and wrote, "Game Of Death is not a film in the least bit concerned with strong characters or even believability but it does offer up enough mindless action and violence to keep and hold the pace." David Johnson of DVD Verdict called it "a mediocre thriller highlighted by some nifty pugilism". Jamie Russell of Total Film rated it 2/5 stars and called it "your standard CIA-Mafia-doublecrossing-flashback nonsense".
