= Ninja Turf =

- Directed by: Woo-sang Park
- Written by: Ji-woon Hong; Jaime Mendoza-Nava
- Produced by: Jun Chong
- Starring: Jun Chong; Phillip Rhee; James Lew; Bill Wallace; Loren Avedon
- Cinematography: David Kim; Maximo Munzi
- Edited by: Alex Chang
- Music by: Gary Falcone; Charles Pavlosky; Barry Scheider
- Distributed by: Manson International
- Release date: 1985
- Running time: 85 minutes
- Country: United States
- Language: English

Ninja Turf (닌자 터프) is a 1985 Korean-American martial arts film that is also released under the title L.A. Streetfighters. It stars Jun Chong and Phillip Rhee. With Loren Avedon, Thomas F. Wilson in his feature film debut, and Peter Malota appear in this film in small roles.

The film also goes by other titles such as Street Gang (Finland), LA Street War (France), Chinese Connection (France, bootleg title), The Yellow Devils of Los Angeles (Germany), Los Angeles Warriors (Poland), The L.A. Fighters (Portugal), Ninja Territory (Russia), Chinatown (South Korea), Los Angeles Command (Spain), Street Fighters (Turkey), and Fighters from Los Angeles (Ukraine).

== Plot ==
Tony is the new kid at school. Right off the bat, he befriends gang leader Young and his friends Mark, Frank, and Darrin. However, after bumping into Young's rival Chan, he gets threatened. Young challenges Chan to a fight and defeats him using a wooden sword to Chan's staff. Two mysterious people show up and offer Young and his friends a job for a private security agency. When the boys aren't in school, they pull security at a party. They get into fights with the Spikes Gang, a racist gang and the Blades, a Latino gang. Meanwhile, Tony starts a romance with Lily, who just happens to be Chan's sister and that just makes Chan even more upset and at the same time, Young seems jealous that Tony has found love where Young feels alone due to his mother's constant drinking and promiscuity. He sees Tony as a brother and when he sees him with Lily, it makes his upset.

When the boys are asked to do security for a rich businessman, Young learns that his new client is actually one of the biggest drug dealers in the city. After the party, while the dealer is with his girlfriend, Young takes the briefcase of money the mob boss scored on the deal and runs off. Angry, the mob boss hires two hitmen, a master Yakuza swordsman named Yoshida and a New York-based martial artist named Kruger. The hitmen confront Chan and his men, yet Chan decides to help them locate their hideout. Mark, Frank, and Darrin are all kidnapped and tortured. While Tony is at home studying, Young proceeds to take out the syndicate. He kills Yoshida but is slightly injured in the process. He defeats Kruger by breaking his knee.

On his way back with the very injured Mark, Frank, and Darrin, Young is confronted by Chan and his gang. Finally realizing her mistakes, Young's mother tells Young she is sorry and that she loves him. However, Chan proceeds to hit Young's mom and Young is mortally wounded in a fight. Tony, looking for Young, finds his fallen friend and goes on a rampage. Taking Young's wooden sword, he proceeds to defeat Chan's gang and mortally wound Chan himself with a strike to the head with the sword. As Young's mom and Tony run towards Young, Young passes away in their arms and the two grieve as daylight hits Los Angeles.

== Cast ==
- Jun Chong as Young
- Phillip Rhee as Tony
- James Lew as Chan
- Rosanna King as Lily
- Bill Wallace as Kruger
- Ken Nagayama as Yoshida
- Mark Hicks as Mark
- Frank Marmolejo as Frank
- Darrin Mukama as Darrin
- Loren Avedon as Chan's Gang Member
- Danny Gibson as Spikes Gang Leader
- John Rojas as Blades Leader
- Toma Gjokaj as Drug Dealer
- Brinke Stevens as Boss's Girlfriend
- Peter Malota as Syndicate Gang Member
- Thomas F. Wilson as Spikes Gang Member

== Reception ==
The movie gained mixed reviews.
