= Ring of Death (film) =

- Written by: Matthew Chernov, David Rosiak, Dan Fitzsimons
- Directed by: Bradford May
- Theme music composer: Justin Caine Burnett
- Country of origin: United States
- Original language: English

Production
- Producers: Milena Milicevic, Randy Pope
- Cinematography: Maximo Munzi
- Editor: Thomas A. Krueger
- Running time: 80 minutes
- Production companies: Larry Levinson Productions; Alpine Medien; RHI Entertainment

Original release
- Network: Spike TV
- Release: June 23, 2008

Ring of Death is a 2008 American television film directed by Bradford May and starring Johnny Messner, Stacy Keach and Charlotte Ross. It was created for Spike TV in 2008.

== Plot ==
Burke Wyatt (Johnny Messner) is a hardened ex-cop with a seasoned history of extreme and over-the-top methods during his time with the police, but having been dismissed for the past three years after drastically subduing a criminal, he wades through a rough stretch in his life; separated from his wife (Charlotte Ross), he plays a part-time father to their only son, Tommy (Uriah Shelton).

He quietly harbors a desire to return to the force, and he gets the chance when approached by his old partner and friend, and now a successful FBI agent, Steve James (Derek Webster), who visits Burke to talk about an investigation into the suspicious and violent murders of several inmates at Cainsville State Penitentiary, a notorious and brutal maximum security prison, with the suspicion that the prison warden, Carl Golan (Stacy Keach), is running an underground fight club where prisoners fight to the death for the entertainment of private viewers and paying internet subscribers and for the financial gain of prison officials. Needing someone to infiltrate the prison, Burke is offered the job with the promise of a massive trust fund for his son and reinstatement on the force with an FBI job. Unable to let the opportunity pass, he agrees to the prospects and his desire whetted, the offer can't be refused and he agrees to pose as a prison inmate to investigate the deaths.

A high-profile operation, the only way to get inside the prison without arousing suspicion is for Burke to commit a crime himself and receive a jail sentence. Waiting outside a police precinct, he assaults an officer and steals his squad car, then purposely surrenders himself, and once sentenced, is transported to the prison in a bus with other convicts.

Not long after arrival inside, Burke brushes with some of the more dangerous inmates of the prison, almost landing himself in fatal situations, and eventually crosses swords with Milton Kennedy a.k.a. "The President" (Lester Speight), a towering, physically imposing and vicious criminal and the boss of the prison's biggest gang known as 'The Disciples'. Feared and respected by all other felons, he has an untouchable status among them as well as to the guards.

Burke's steel is then tested when he must defend himself against a lowly group of cons, but his prowess only attracts the interest of Warden Golan, who only sees in him a new addition to his league of fighters. Soon, FBI suspicions are confirmed when Burke is plunged into a cruel, sadistic world of life or death duels where he finds himself forced to compete for the warden and his guards in the blood sport that he was drafted to expose.

== Cast ==
- Johnny Messner - Burke Wyatt
- Charlotte Ross - Mary Wyatt
- Uriah Shelton - Thomas "Tommy" Wyatt
- Frank Sivero - Tommy Micelli
- Lester Speight - The President / Milton Kennedy
