= American Traitor: The Trial of Axis Sally =

2021 American drama film

- Film poster
- Directed by: Michael Polish
- Screenplay by: Vance Owen; Darryl Hicks; Michael Polish
- Based on: Axis Sally Confidential by William E. Owen
- Produced by: Randall Emmett; George Furla; Vance Owen; Luillo Ruiz; Shaun Sanghani; Meadow Williams
- Starring: Meadow Williams; Thomas Kretschmann; Al Pacino; Swen Temmel; Mitch Pileggi; Carsten Norgaard; Lala Kent; Marcus Rafinski; Carlos Leal
- Cinematography: Jayson Crothers
- Edited by: Raùl Marchand Sánchez; Gavin Segall-Abrams
- Music by: Kubilay Uner
- Production companies: Diamond Film Productions; EFO; The Pimienta Film Co.
- Distributed by: Vertical Entertainment; Redbox Entertainment
- Release date: May 28, 2021
- Running time: 108 minutes
- Country: United States
- Language: English

American Traitor: The Trial of Axis Sally is a 2021 American historical drama film directed by Michael Polish, from a screenplay by Vance Owen and Darryl Hicks, based on the book Axis Sally Confidential by William E. Owen. It is based on the life of Mildred Gillars, an American singer and actor who, during World War II, broadcast Nazi propaganda to American troops and their families back home. The film stars Al Pacino, Meadow Williams, Swen Temmel, Thomas Kretschmann and Mitch Pileggi.

It was released on May 28, 2021, by Vertical Entertainment and Redbox Entertainment.

== Plot ==
An American woman named Mildred Gillars broadcasts Nazi propaganda during World War II. She is dubbed "Axis Sally" by the American G.I.s who simultaneously love and hate her. The story plunges the viewer into the dark underbelly of the Third Reich's propaganda machine, Sally's eventual capture, and her subsequent trial for treason in Washington D.C. after the war.

The court trial intends to prove that Axis Sally is a traitor to her country. Other Americans who have contributed to Nazi propaganda are called to testify during the trial. The defense is, if one had not done as instructed, the penalty would be deportation to a concentration camp. Her actions were allegedly therefore done under force. Under this logic, she escapes the death penalty. However, she is convicted of treason and sentenced to 30 years in prison, with a possibility of parole after 10.

== Cast ==
- Al Pacino as James Laughlin, an attorney who represents Gillars after she is put on trial for treason
- Meadow Williams as Mildred Gillars
- Swen Temmel as Billy Owen
- Thomas Kretschmann as Joseph Goebbels
- Mitch Pileggi as John Kelley, the prosecutor at Gillars's trial
- Lala Kent as Elva
- Carsten Norgaard as Max Otto Koischwitz
- Drew Taylor as Randy

== Production ==
In May 2017, it was announced that EFO Films acquired the screenplay Axis Sally by Vance Owen and Darryl Hicks, based on the book Axis Sally Confidential by Willem E. Owen. In November 2018, Al Pacino, Meadow Williams and Swen Temmel joined the cast, with Michael Polish directing. In February 2019, Thomas Kretschmann, Mitch Pileggi and Lala Kent joined the cast. In April 2019, Carsten Norgaard joined. It was also announced that Kubilay Uner would compose the film's score.

Principal photography took place in Dorado, Puerto Rico, in February 2019.

== Release ==
In April 2021, Vertical Entertainment and Redbox Entertainment acquired the North American distribution rights to the film, which had been retitled American Traitor: The Trial of Axis Sally, and prepared for its release on May 28, 2021.

== Reception ==
The review aggregator website Rotten Tomatoes surveyed 21 critics and, categorizing the reviews as positive or negative, assessed three as positive and 18 as negative for a 19% rating. Among the reviews, it determined an average rating of 3.7 out of 10.

Hope Madden of UK Film Review said, "Aside from Pacino, the cast is uniformly awful."

Sean Means of Movie Cricket called the film a bore and a production of incompetence.

The film grossed $14,000 on its opening weekend of May 28, 2021, and a later opening release in the United Arab Emirates grossed $8,829. Worldwide it grossed a total of $2,011,012.
