= LaSirena69 =

Venezuelan-Italian pornographic actress

- Born: Antonella Alonso; 9 June 1990 (age 36); Baruta, Miranda, Venezuela
- Other name: LaSirena69
- Education: Saint Mary University
- Occupation: Pornographic actress
- Height: 5 ft 2 in (157 cm)
- Family: María Conchita Alonso (aunt)
- Website: lasirena69.cool

Antonella Alonso (born 9 June 1990), also known by her stage name LaSirena69, is a Venezuelan pornographic actress.

== Biography ==
Antonella Alonso was born on 9 June 1990 in Caracas and studied social communication for a couple of semesters at Saint Mary University, but dropped out to study advertising at the New Careers Institute (Spanish: Instituto Nuevas Profesiones) in Las Mercedes. She wrote her humanities mention thesis on geishas, and during the two years of the diversified cycle, she wrote a paper entitled "Approaching a concept of women to understand the geisha", which dealt with women working in the sex industry, from the hetairas of ancient Greece and Japanese geishas to contemporary prostitution. In March 2015 she emigrated to Miami, where she lived for three years, and after several job dismissals for exhibiting herself in erotic photographs through her social networks, she began to sell her nude photographs. A year and a half later, she moved to Los Angeles, where she met a porn star who put her in contact with the adult industry, the way she started her career in industry.

In 2020, Alonso was nominated in the Best New Starlet category of the AVN Awards and in the Most Popular Female Newcomer category in the third edition of the PornHub Awards. In February 2021, she was named "Pet of the month" by Penthouse magazine. She also received an AVN Award in the "Best Female Revelation" category. She has appeared on the cover of magazines such as UB Magazine and modeled for photographers such as Mike "Ohrangu" Tan.

As of 2021, Alonso worked in Los Angeles, California.
