= Ultimate Force (film) =

2005 action film

- Directed by: Mark Burson
- Written by: Mark Burson
- Produced by: Rafael Primorac; Mirko "Cro Cop" Filipović
- Starring: Mirko "Cro Cop" Filipović
- Cinematography: Jeff Barklage
- Edited by: Mark Burson
- Music by: Jon Parfitt
- Distributed by: BCI Home Entertainment
- Release dates: September 22, 2005 (Japan); March 31, 2006 (Croatia)
- Running time: 93 minutes
- Countries: United States; Croatia
- Language: English

Ultimate Force is a 2005 action film written and directed by Mark Burson. The film stars kickboxing/MMA superstar Mirko Filipović as a tough war veteran. The film was released theatrically in Croatia and directly to video in the United States and most parts of the world.

== Plot ==
Agent Axon Rey (Filipović), a decorated war hero and former police officer is recruited by a secret government organization and trained to become "Sphinx", an assassin working for an anti-terrorist organization, undertaking missions where failure means death. After failing to execute one of his targets, his life is spared, however, and his supervisor, Janus (Galo), instead sends him to "Gulag 7", a rehabilitation island. Sphinx is forced to face five other government operatives in a battle of life and death. After defeating them, in a jail cell he finds Nina (Mađarević), his former lover, whose death was faked by the Director (Smiljanić). Together they have to team up with Janus to assassinate the Director.

== Cast ==
- Mirko "Cro Cop" Filipović as Axon Rey/Sphinx
- Božidar Smiljanić as The Director
- Ruža Mađarević as Sari/Nina
- Kishore Mandhyan as Vishnu Prana
- Zvonimir Lučić as Interrogator, the man who tortures Axon Rey
- Matthew Earley as Guggenheim
- Christopher Forbes as Caesar
- Igor Galo as Janus (billed as Igor Gallo)

== Reception ==
The film received negative reviews. Dragan Antulov of Index.hr, a Croatian daily tabloid, was less enthusiastic about the movie, citing its one-dimensionality and having a low opinion about its directing and special effects, comparing quality of the latter to "'futuristic' TV shows made in former Yugoslavia during the 1980s." Dustin Somner for Blu-ray.com reviewed the audio and video quality of the film's Blu-ray release, giving it 0.5 stars out of 5, saying the "film sounds like it was made 40 years ago."

== Home media ==
The films was released on Blu-ray on 13 November 2007.
