= The Ring (1996 film) =

1996 film by Armand Mastroianni

- Home video cover
- Genre: Drama; Romance
- Based on: The Ring by Danielle Steel
- Written by: Nancy Sackett; Carmen Culver
- Directed by: Armand Mastroianni
- Starring: Nastassja Kinski; Linda Lavin; Michael York; Carsten Norgaard; Rupert Penry-Jones; James B. Sikking
- Music by: Michel Legrand
- Country of origin: United States
- Original language: English

Production
- Executive producer: Douglas S. Cramer
- Producers: Kay Hoffman; Dennis Hammer; Gerald T. Olson
- Production locations: Prague, Czech Republic; New York City; Montreal
- Cinematography: Gideon Porath
- Editor: Scott Vickrey
- Running time: 180 minutes
- Production company: Stillking Productions
- Budget: USD 10,000,000

Original release
- Network: NBC
- Release: October 20 – October 21, 1996

The Ring, also known as Danielle Steel's The Ring, is a 1996 American romantic drama television film directed by Armand Mastroianni and written by Danielle Steel, based on her 1981 novel of the same name. It stars Nastassja Kinski and Michael York.

It was first broadcast on NBC in 2 parts on October 20 and October 21, 1996, and marked the last of Danielle Steel's novels to be broadcast as made-for-television films on the NBC network in the 1990s.

== Plot ==
During World War II, a young aristocratic German woman, Ariana von Gotthard, is separated from her family and imprisoned. After being freed she falls in love with military officer Manfred von Tripp, of a similar aristocratic background, and they get married. When Berlin falls to the Soviets and her husband is killed, she flees to the United States carrying his unborn child, not giving up hope that she will find her family, which is tied together by her mother's ring.

== Cast ==
- Nastassja Kinski as Ariana von Gotthard
- Linda Lavin as Ruth Liebman
- Michael York as Walmar von Gotthard
- Jon Tenney as Paul Liebman
- Tim DeKay as Max Thomas
- James B. Sikking as Sam Liebman
- Leslie Caron as Madame de Saint Marne
- Rupert Penry-Jones as Gerhard von Gotthard
- Carsten Norgaard as Captain Manfred Von Tripp
- Julie Cox as Giselle
- Elizabeth Barondes as Tammy Liebman
- Sheila Allen as Frau Hedwig
- Paula Bacon
- Stephen Fisher
- Marinel Fitzsimmons
- Kenneth Haigh
- Paula Hamilton
- Nigel Hastings
- Jack Hedley
- Marta Hrachovinová
- Paulette Ivory
- Ilene Kreshka
- Leigh Lawson
- Geno Lechner
- Kaki Lucius
- Mirek Lux
- Jean Marsh
- Jack May
- Lloyd Moss
- Arnost Neufeld
- Alessandro Nivola
- David Schaeffer

== Production ==
The film was shot on location in Prague, New York City, and Montreal. NBC provided a budget of USD 10,000,000 (USD 19427116, adjusted for inflation as of 2023).

When asked about his role in the film, Michael York said he often wondered why he had been chosen to portray so many individuals who lived through the horrors of Nazi Germany, on either side of the conflict. With respect to von Gotthard, he specified that the character would have been in what York felt to be the silent minority within Nazi Germany.

== Reception ==
The film, originally billed as a two-part mini-series, received mixed reviews.

Kirk Nicewonger, writing for the United Features Syndicate group of newspapers, briefly stated that it would be enjoyable for fans of Steel's work, but was very negative in his opinion of its reception among general viewers.

Tom Shales, writing for The Washington Post, found it to be both "flashy and classy", described the score as romantic, and though critical of the dialogue - especially when historically incongruent - was overall positive in his review.

Andy Webb's review for The Movie Scene gave the film three stars, noting that it included elements he felt were typical for Steel films such as over-the-top delivery and over-acting. Webb also acknowledged that most viewers don't watch Steel films for convincing acting.

Patricia Smagge, for Cine Magazine, acknowledged that the overabundance of romanticism is part and parcel of a Steel film adaptation but that the film is too dependent on coincidences to be taken seriously. She preferred the first half to the second, yet stated that she found the acting throughout to be good and complimented Kinski and Norgaard's on-screen chemistry. She stated that the melodrama was what one could expect from such fare and would be enjoyed by those not expecting too much reality from the film.

While acknowledging that Steel's films were the most reliable programming for NBC to counter sporting events broadcast on other networks, Variety's Ray Richmond was overwhelmingly negative in his review, calling the film "numbingly lame" while comparing The Ring unfavorably to Santa Claus Conquers the Martians. Richmond harshly criticized the setting, stating that the film managed to make World War II "inconsequential and vapid", though he did seem to enjoy the film's score.

Jocelyn Beard, writing for TVData Features, mostly focused on the production of the piece, revealing NBC's allotted budget and stating that "every penny seems well-spent", adding that fans would be pleased with the result.

The New York Times' reviewer John Martin stated that romance was absent in this particular piece, and that the lies Ariana tells throughout make it very difficult to like her, let alone feel any sympathy for her and the situations she finds herself embroiled in. Martin was also critical of Kinski's acting, stating the performance was emotionless.

Jonathan Storm of The Philadelphia Inquirer, though, praised Kinski's role and Legrand's score, but otherwise had nothing positive to say about The Ring at all.

Nielsen reported the viewing numbers for the initial showing of part two on Monday, October 21, 1996 at 10.7, with each ratings point equaling 970,000 U.S. households.
