= María Conchita (album) =

Studio album by María Conchita Alonso
- Released: 1984
- Recorded: 1983–1984; Studio Sound Records (New York, New York); Ocean Way Recording Studios; Record Plant Studio (Hollywood, California)
- Genre: Latin pop (80's)
- Language: Spanish
- Label: A&M Records
- Producer: Juan Carlos Calderón

María Conchita Alonso chronology
María Conchita (1984)	O Ella, O Yo (1985)

María Conchita is the debut studio album recorded by Cuban-Venezuelan performer María Conchita Alonso. It was released by A&M Records in 1984, and produced by Juan Carlos Calderón. The album was nominated for a Grammy Award for Best Latin Pop Performance at the 27th Annual Grammy Awards on February 26, 1985.

== Track listing ==
All tracks written by Juan Carlos Calderón, except "La Loca", written by Las Diego.

No.	Title	Length
1.	"Acaríciame"	4:20
2.	"Noche de Copas"	3:33
3.	"La Loca"	3:58
4.	"Cadenas"	3:43
5.	"Decir Te Quiero"	2:50
6.	"Entre la Espada y la Pared"	4:03
7.	"Amor de Madrugada"	4:18
8.	"Dame un Poquito de tu Amor (Gimme a Little of Your Love)"	5:43
9.	"Eres Tan Real"	3:40
