= Carsten Norgaard =

Danish actor (born 1963)

Carsten Nørgaard
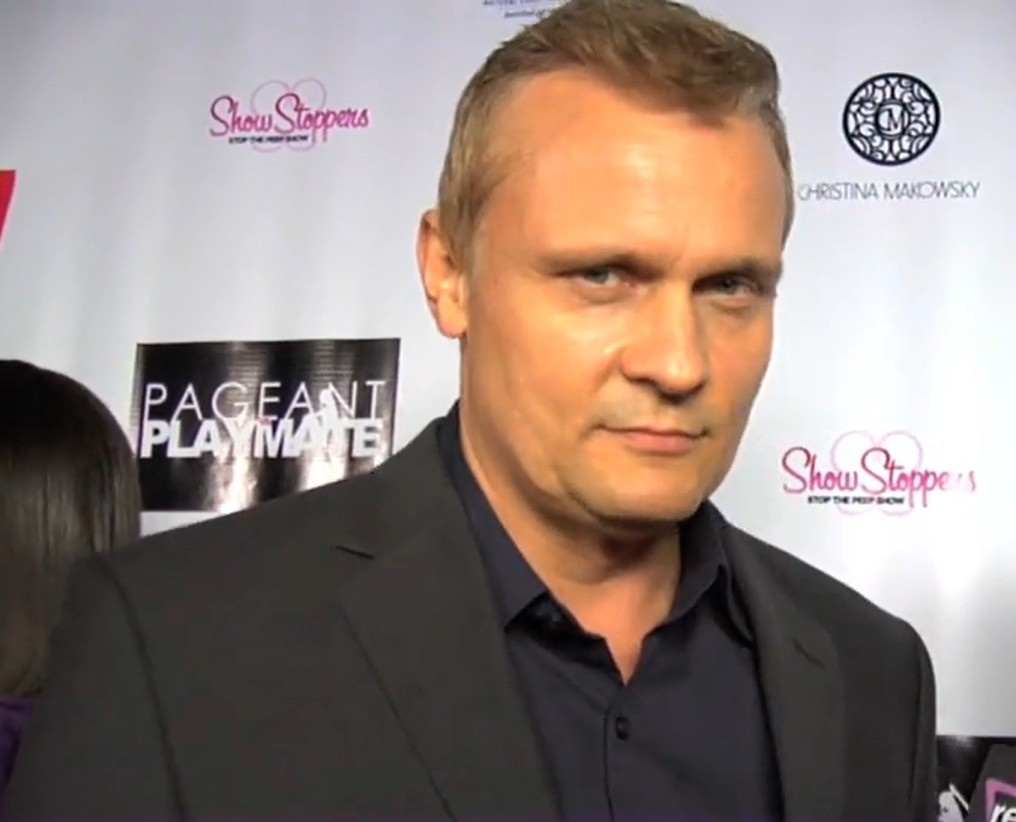
- Norgaard in 2011
- Born: Carsten Nørgaard; 3 March 1963 (age 63); Frederiksberg, Denmark
- Occupations: Actor, economist
- Years active: 1987−present

Carsten Nørgaard (born 3 March 1963) is a Danish actor. Norgaard was born in Frederiksberg, Denmark. He began his career playing the enigmatic Dolphin Man in the 1988 film The Fruit Machine (known as Wonderland in the U.S.). Norgaard also appeared in the Disney film D2: The Mighty Ducks (1994). Notable recent appearances include The Man in the High Castle, American Traitor: The Trial of Axis Sally, and Cobra Kai.

Nørgaard broke a rib during the filming of Alien Vs. Predator.

In Ireland he is most famous as the face of the Norwegian oil company Statoil having featured in their TV adverts there in the 1990s.

Nørgaard has an economics degree from Denmark and has studied at Actors Centre in London. He participated in the Tour de Rouge charitable bicycle race in 2019.

== Filmography ==
- 1988: The Fruit Machine - Dolphin Man
- 1990: The Strange Affliction of Anton Bruckner (TV Movie) - Hans
- 1990: The Manageress (TV Series) - Brian Scherfig
- 1991: Prisoner of Honor (TV Movie) - Col. von Schwartzkoppen
- 1992: Tales from Hollywood (TV Series) - Young Man
- 1993: Red Shoe Diaries - (episode "Midnight Bells") (video)
- 1994: D2: The Mighty Ducks - Coach Wolf Stansson
- 1995: Highlander: The Series (TV Series) - Kanwulf the Viking destroyer
- 1995: Out of Annie's Past (TV Movie) - Lev Petrovich
- 1996: The Spartans (Short)
- 1996: The Ring (TV Movie) - Capt. Manfred Von Tripp
- 1997: House of Frankenstein (TV Mini-Series) - Williger
- 1998: Soldier - Green
- 1999: David and Lola - Liam
- 2000: Missing Pieces (TV Movie) - Reinhardt
- 2001: The Gristle - Race
- 2003: Gods and Generals - Major General Darius Nash Couch
- 2004: Alien vs. Predator - Rusten Quinn
- 2006: End Game - Arman
- 2007: The Black Pimpernel - Winther
- 2007: Military Academy - Gregory Ridgeley
- 2007: Resident Evil: Extinction - Zombie Steve (uncredited)
- 2010: CSI: Crime Scene Investigation (TV Series) - German Agent #1
- 2011: The Three Musketeers - Jussac
- 2012: Sinbad (TV Series) - Obsedian
- 2012: Rita (TV Series) - Tom Dyrehave
- 2013: Air Force One Is Down - Russian defence minister
- 2013: Sleepy Hollow (TV Series) - Hessian Soldier
- 2015: Person of Interest (TV series) - Sven Vanger
- 2015, 2018: The Man in the High Castle (TV Series) - SS-Standartenführer Rudolph Wegener
- 2016: Grimm - Krisztian
- 2021: American Traitor: The Trial of Axis Sally - Max Otto Koischwitz
- 2022: Nuremberg (2023 film) - Hermann Goring
- 2022: The Terminal List - Elias Ryberg
- 2022–2025: Cobra Kai - Gunther Braun (seasons 5–6)
