= The Good, the Bad, and the Dead =

2015 film by Timothy Woodward Jr.

- Promotional release poster
- Directed by: Timothy Woodward Jr.
- Written by: Sean Ryan
- Produced by: Jose Alvarado; Allen Cardoza; Craigar Grosvenor; Michael J Long; Lauren De Normandie; Timothy Woodward Jr.
- Starring: Johnny Messner; Dolph Lundgren; Danny Trejo; Vivica A. Fox; Michael Paré
- Cinematography: Pablo Díez
- Edited by: Caroline Miller
- Music by: Sid De La Cruz
- Production companies: Status Media & Entertainment; Puppy Entertainment
- Distributed by: VMI Worldwide; Cinedigm Entertainment Group; Universal Music & Video Distribution
- Release dates: September 11, 2015 (Burbank International Film Festival); October 6, 2015 (Blu-ray/DVD premiere)
- Running time: 84 minutes
- Country: United States
- Language: English

The Good, the Bad, and the Dead (stylized on-screen as 4Got10) is a 2015 American action thriller film directed by Timothy Woodward Jr., and starring Johnny Messner, Dolph Lundgren, Danny Trejo, Vivica A. Fox, and Michael Paré. The film follows Brian Barns, a man who wakes up in the middle of the desert with no memory of who he is. Surrounded by eight dead bodies, $3 million in cash and a van full of cocaine, Barns is pursued by a DEA agent, a corrupt sheriff, and a Mexican drug lord.

== Plot ==
Brian Barns wakes up in the middle of the desert injured and with no memory of who he is. Surrounded by eight dead bodies, $3 million in cash, and a van full of cocaine, he is pursued by drug lord Mateo Perez, who wants his drugs and money back; DEA agent Bob Rooker; and Sheriff Olson, who is corrupt and out for his own financial gain.

== Cast ==
- Johnny Messner as Brian Barns
- Dolph Lundgren as DEA Agent Bob Rooker
- Danny Trejo as Mateo Perez
- Vivica A. Fox as Imani Cole
- Michael Paré as Sheriff Olson
- Michael J. Long as Deputy Samuel Perez
- Natassia Malthe as Christine
- John Laughlin as Howard
- Angell Conwell as DEA Agent Taylor
- Chris Jai Alex as DEA Agent Black
- Erin O'Brien as Jesse
- Jon Foo as Officer
- Stefania Spampinato as Sarah Barns
- Jayde Rossi as News Reporter
- Leonel Claude as Morgue Technician
- Josh Berger as Eric
- Braxton Davis as DEA Agent Mic
- Stephen Brown as Officer Mike
- Slim Khezri as Detective
- Klement Tinaj as Detective
