= Overrun (film) =

- Directed by: Josh Tessier
- Written by: Roberto Ahumada; Victoria González
- Starring: Omid Zader; Johnny Messner; Bruce Dern; William Katt; Nicholas Turturro; Chris Tallman
- Production company: Turbo Panda Productions
- Distributed by: Strike Back Studios
- Release date: August 17, 2021
- Running time: 105 minutes
- Country: United States
- Language: English

Overrun is a 2021 American action crime comedy film directed by Josh Tessier, and starring Omid Zader, Johnny Messner, Bruce Dern, William Katt, Nicholas Turturro and Chris Tallman. It is Tessier's feature directorial debut. It is also an expansion of Zader and Tessier's 2013 short film Raw Brute.

== Plot ==
Marcus Lombardi (Zader) is an ex-military extraction specialist whose sister is exposed as an informant for Ray Barren (Miano), a criminal kingpin.

== Cast ==
- Omid Zader as Marcus Lombardi
- Johnny Messner as Detective Blake Finning
- Bruce Dern as Arkadi Dubkova
- William Katt as Detective Ed Dobbs
- Nicholas Turturro as "Doc"
- Chris Tallman as Detective James Walsh
- Chelsey Goldsmith as Reyna Lombardi
- Jack Griffo as Auggy Riggs
- Christopher Troy as Boka

== Release ==
The film was released on video on demand (VOD) and digital platforms on August 17, 2021. Then it was released on DVD and Blu-ray on November 16, 2021.

== Reception ==
Alan Ng of Film Threat rated the film a 7.5 out of 10. In his review, Ng concluded by saying if the "story was less jokey and the plot less complicated, it might have moved the needle higher for me, but in the end, it's a solid film with good performances all around.
