= Kill 'Em All 2 =

- Official DVD cover
- Directed by: Valeri Milev
- Written by: James Agnew
- Produced by: Rafael Primorac; Richard Salvatore; Danielle Maloni; Andrea Iervolino; Monika Bacardi
- Starring: Jean-Claude Van Damme; Jacqueline Fernandez; Peter Stormare; María Conchita Alonso
- Cinematography: Angelo Stramaglia
- Edited by: Alessandro Heffler
- Music by: Aldo Shllaku
- Production companies: Destination Films; Dinamo Film; Lady Bacardi Media; March On Productions; Rodin Entertainment
- Distributed by: Destination Films
- Release date: September 24, 2024
- Running time: 85 minutes
- Countries: United States; Italy
- Language: English

Kill 'Em All 2 is a 2024 direct-to-video action film directed by Valeri Milev and written by James Agnew. It is a direct sequel to Kill 'Em All (2017), and stars Jean-Claude Van Damme, Jacqueline Fernandez, Peter Stormare, and María Conchita Alonso.

Kill 'Em All 2 was released on digital on September 24, 2024.

== Plot ==
Phillip comes face to face with a Russian-French terrorist who comes to exact vengeance on him for killing his brother.

== Cast ==
- Jean-Claude Van Damme as Philip
- Jacqueline Fernandez as Vanessa
- Peter Stormare as CIA Agent Holman
- María Conchita Alonso as FBI Agent Sanders
- Dimitar Doychinov as Kaz
- Andrei Lenart as Vlad Petrović
- Talia Asseraf as Lydia
- Nicolas Van Varenberg as Ivan
- Meredith Mickelson as Nadia
- Antonino Iuorio as Govel

== Production ==
In December 2023, a sequel to Kill 'Em All (2017) was announced, with Jean-Claude Van Damme reprising his role as Philip, with principal photography beginning in January 2024.

== Release ==
Kill 'Em All 2 was released on digital on September 24, 2024.
