= Love Maniac =

Studio album by María Conchita Alonso
- Released: 1979
- Genre: Disco
- Label: Polydor
- Producer: Rudy La Scala

Love Maniac is the first album by María Conchita Alonso. It was released on 1979 as a collaboration with Italo-Venezuelan producer Rudy La Scala and songwriter Yrma Silva, under the nickname of Ambar. The album was recorded in English and the songs were influenced by Donna Summer and other disco artists from that era.

The album has a similar structure of Donna Summer's first albums, as Side A includes a 17-minute long version of the title track. Side B includes the ballad "Together To Heaven Or Hell", where Rudy La Scala performs the lead vocals. Also included is the "Sweet Lover" trilogy, with "Sweet Lover (Part 1.)" and "Sweet Lover (Part 3.)" being disco stompers and "Sweet Lover (Part 2.)" being a slow tempo number with spoken vocals. An alternate version of "Together To Heaven Or Hell", featuring Alonso on lead vocals, was released later in 1984, in the Greatest Hits compilation "Te Amo".

Alonso was already popular in Venezuela, after being crowned Miss Teen Venezuela in 1975 and appearing in a few soap operas. However, local artists recording in English were somewhat of a novelty in Venezuela at that time and music experts feared that an audience wouldn't take her seriously as a singer. Keeping that in mind, the record label decided not to use Alonso's picture on the cover for the promo single and the release of the song was surrounded by mystery. The marketing strategy paid off and the song went to become a hit, topping the Venezuelan charts in September of that year.

The album has only been released on 12" vinyl and on cassette, and is currently out of print.

== Track listing ==
1. "Love Maniac"
2. "Together To Heaven Or Hell"
3. "Sweet Lover (Part 1.)"
4. "Sweet Lover (Part 2.)"
5. "Sweet Lover (Part 3.)"

Other Issues:

45 RPM
Mexico 1979 Promo (two tracks)
Venezuela 1979 Promo
Italy 1979 Remix - Fausto Terenzi (two tracks)Cat# 2141 133

LP:
Canada 1979

Best of:
Maria Conchita - Te amo 1984
