= Johnny Messner (actor) =

American film and television actor (born 1970)

- Born: April 11, 1970 (age 56); Syracuse, New York, U.S.
- Occupation: Actor
- Years active: 1998–present
- Spouse: Avril Grace
- Partner: Kathryn Morris (separated)
- Children: 2

Johnny Messner (born April 11, 1970) is an American actor and producer best known for his performance as Bill Johnson in the 2004 film Anacondas: The Hunt for the Blood Orchid.

== Biography ==
Messner was born on April 11, 1970, in Syracuse, New York. He is of German, Italian and Spanish descent. He lived in Europe for 13 years while his father served in the United States Air Force, mainly in Germany and England. During this time, he developed a love for sports while playing on teams at military bases. He has one brother and one sister. He briefly attended San Diego State University to major in sports broadcasting but eventually decided to drop out. Soon after that he went back to New York where he pursued an acting career. He has several tattoos; one depicts Italian actress Monica Bellucci, and another is of his father.

As an actor Messner is probably best known for his work in the films Tears of the Sun, The Whole Ten Yards and Hostage, and in the TV series Guiding Light (working with friend Frank Grillo and a young Hayden Panettiere), Law & Order: Special Victims Unit and Cold Case. In August 2004, American action adventure film Anacondas: The Hunt for the Blood Orchid, starring Messner as an ex-military man Bill Johnson, premiered in theaters. It was the actor's first leading role in a mainstream movie. In December 2004, the horror-themed website CampBlood named him the 2004's sexiest man in horror.

Known as an action hero, he starred in numerous genre films including Anacondas: The Hunt for the Blood Orchid (2004), Tears of the Sun (2003), Running Scared (2006), Arena (2011), Kill 'em All (2012), The Good, the Bad, and the Dead (2015), Silencer (2018), and Beyond the Law (2019). He portrayed the main protagonist, an ex-police officer Burke Wyatt, in the 2008 action film Ring of Death, created for Spike TV. A torture sequence, shot for the film, required Messner to be waterboarded.

Messner's ex-partner is Kathryn Morris, whom he met while shooting Cold Case. They have twin sons. Messner is currently married to Avril Grace.

== Filmography ==
=== Film ===
Year	Title	Role	Notes
2000	Dancing in September	Officer Jenkins	
2001	Operation Delta Force 4: Deep Fault	Vickers	
2002	The Sweetest Thing	Todd	
2003	Tears of the Sun	Johnny Kelly "JKL" Lake	
2003	Finding Home	Nick	
2004	Spartan	Grace	
2004	The Whole Ten Yards	Zevo	
2004	Anacondas: The Hunt for the Blood Orchid	Bill Johnson	
2004	Our Time is Up	Playboy	
2005	Hostage	Mr. Jones	
2006	One Last Thing...	Jason O'Malley	
2006	Running Scared	Tommy "Tombs" Perello	
2006	Bottoms Up	Tony	
2007	Believers	David Vaughn	
2008	The Art of Travel	Christopher Loren	
2008	Remarkable Power	Doug Wade	
2008	Loaded	Javon	
2008	Ring of Death	Burke Wyatt	
2008	The Poker Club	Bill	
2009	Wrong Turn at Tahoe	Mickey	
2010	Corrado	Corrado	
2011	Arena	Kaden	
2011	Caught on Tape	Tito	
2012	She Wants Me	John	
2012	Kill 'em All	Gabriel	
2013	Officer Down	McAlister	
2013	The Outsider	Ricky	
2014	The Equalizer	P&E Worker	
2015	Condemned	Gault	
2015	Checkmate	Joey	
2015	The Good, the Bad and the Dead	Brian Barns	
2016	The Perfect Weapon	Condor	
2016	Decommissioned	John Niles	
2017	American Violence	Paul	
2018	Silencer	Frank	
2018	Alone We Fight	Captain Hank Kedry	
2019	Beyond the Law	Frank Wilson	
2020	Final Kill	Pauly	
2020	Breach	Blue	
2021	Cosmic Sin	Coco	
2021	Overrun	Detective Blake Finning	
2021	Deadlock	Cranbrook	Also producer
2022	American Siege	Silas	
2022	A Day to Die	Schipp	
2022	Detective Knight: Rogue	Brigga	Also Executive Producer
2023	Detective Knight: Redemption		Executive Producer only
2023	Detective Knight: Independence		Executive Producer only
2023	Call Her King	John Stryker	

=== Television ===
Year	Title	Role	Notes
1998	Guiding Light	Rob Layne	22 episodes
1999	Rude Awakening	Cute Podiatrist	Episode: "One Birthday at a Time"
1999	Angel	Kevin	Episode: "Lonely Heart"
2000	CSI: Crime Scene Investigation	Ted Sallanger	Episode: "Cool Change"
2001	Danny	Cash	Episode: "Forget About Your Boss"
2001	Son of the Beach	Handsome Guy	Episode: "Area 69"
2001	Friends	Kash	Episode: "The One With Rachel's Date"
2001	Men, Women & Dogs	Jim	Episode: "Let Sleeping Dogs Lie"
2003	Tarzan	Detective Michael Foster	3 episodes
2005	The O.C.	Lance Baldwin	5 episodes
2005	Miami Ink	Himself	
2005–06	Killer Instinct	Detective Jack Hale	13 episodes
2007	Burn Notice	Harrick	Episode: "Loose Ends, Part 2"
2008	Law & Order: Special Victims Unit	Captain Lowell Harris	Episode "Undercover"
2008	Knight Rider	Sean	Episode: "Journey to the End of the Knight"
2009	CSI: Miami	Ken Vogel	Episode: "Sink or Swim"
2010	Chuck	Rafe Gruber	Episode: "Chuck Versus the Fake Name"
2010	Cold Case	FBI Agent Ryan Cavanaugh	3 episodes
2010	The Gates	Mark Woodbury	Episode: "Pilot"
2010	Dark Blue	Danny	2 episodes
2010	G.I. Joe: Renegades	Flint (voice)	11 episodes
2010	A Soldier's Love Story (originally titled: Meet My Mom)	Sgt. Vince Carrera	Hallmark Movie
2011	CSI: Crime Scene Investigation	Frank Cafferty	Episode: "CSI Down"
2017	Jane the Virgin	Chuck Chesser	10 episodes
2018	Criminal Minds	Jeremy Grant	Episode: "Luke"
2020	Primitive	Dr. Mamedyarov	Episode: "Blind Sighted"
2020	The Christmas High Note	Michael	Lifetime Movie

== Awards and nominations ==
Year	Event	Award/category	Work	Result	Ref.
2004	The Skully Awards	Horror Hottie of the Year	Anacondas: The Hunt for the Blood Orchid	Won	
2012	Behind the Voice Actors Awards (BTVA Television Voice Acting)	Best Vocal Ensemble in a Television Series (shared with Jason Marsden and Clancy Brown, among others)	G.I. Joe: Renegades	Nominated	
