= Božidar Smiljanić =

Croatian actor (1936–2018)

- Born: 20 September 1936; Zagreb, Sava Banovina, Yugoslavia
- Died: 7 April 2018 (aged 81); Zagreb, Croatia
- Occupation: Actor
- Years active: 1953–2018

Božidar Smiljanić (20 September 1936 – 7 April 2018) was a Croatian actor. He appeared in more than 70 films from 1953 to 2018.

His son is popular actor Mitja Smiljanić.

== Filmography ==
Year	Title	Role	Notes
1953	Sinji galeb	Pero	
1962	Kozara	Njemac	
1969	Battle of Neretva	Surgeon	
1977	Operation Stadium	Ilegalac	
1979	Journalist	Milan	
1979	Zivi bili pa vidjeli	Klaric	
1985	Horvat's Choice	Juraj Ratkovic	
1985	Transylvania 6-5000	Insp. Percek	
1986	Armour of God	Count Bannon	
1987	The Dirty Dozen: The Deadly Mission	Paul Verlaine	TV movie
1987	The Princess Academy	Uncle Constantine	
1987	Project A Part II	Governor	
1991	Armour of God II: Operation Condor	Count Bannon	
1991	The Pope Must Die	Cardinal Spott	
1995	Gospa	Father Ivan	
1997	The Peacemaker	Serb Minister Zarko Preljevich	
1999	Četverored	Satnik Petnjaric	
2002	Potonulo groblje		
2003	Milost mora		
2004	100 minuta slave	Salonac Izidor	
2005	First Class Thieves	Državni Lopov	
2005	Ultimate Force	The Director	
2011	Missione di pace	Padre Sava	
2012	Ljudozder vegetarijanac	Profesor Borovina	
2013	Eyjafjallajökull	Osman	
2014	Supercondriaque	Le patron du kebab	
2016	The Constitution	Hrvoje Kralj	
2018	The Eighth Commissioner	Bonino	(final film role)
