= Meadow Williams =

American film and television actress

- Born: Melanie Kay Williams; 1965 or 1966 (age 60–61); Miami, Florida, U.S.
- Occupation: Actress
- Years active: 1989–present
- Spouse: Gerald Kessler (m. 2010; died 2015)

Melanie Kay "Meadow" Williams is an American actress, film producer and singer. She began her career appearing in small roles in films including Beverly Hills Cop III (1994), The Mask (1994) and Apollo 13 (1995). In the 2000s, Williams began working as film producer; her credits include The Harvest (2013), Den of Thieves (2018), After (2019), and Boss Level (2020). She played Mildred Gillars in the 2021 drama film American Traitor: The Trial of Axis Sally, which she also financed.

Williams' acting talent and professional conduct as a film producer were criticized by her American Traitor co-star, Al Pacino.

== Life and career ==
Melanie Kay Williams was born in Miami, Florida and grew up in Tennessee. She began performing in high school and later moved to New York City for work as a model. In New York, Williams studied acting at Larry Moss Studio and later moved to Los Angeles when she began appearing in episodes of television series include Murder, She Wrote, Dream On and Married... with Children. Williams also had secondary roles in films Beverly Hills Cop III (1994), The Mask (1994) and Apollo 13 (1995).

In 2008, Williams began producing and starring in independent films, include the leading roles in Skeletons in the Desert (2008), Raven (2010), and Mysteria (2011). She produced and co-starred opposite Samantha Morton in the 2013 horror film The Harvest, and well as action film Den of Thieves (2018) and romantic drama After (2019). In 2017, she won Daytime Emmy Award for Outstanding Digital Daytime Drama Series as a producer of web-series The Bay. She starred opposite Sylvester Stallone in the 2018 action film Backtrace, and alongside Bruce Willis in the 2019 thriller 10 Minutes Gone. She next played the role of Mildred Gillars in the drama film American Traitor: The Trial of Axis Sally opposite Al Pacino. Williams' American Traitor co-star Al Pacino criticized her acting performance in the film, as well as her professionalism as a producer on the project.

In a 2019 email to producer Randall Emmett, Pacino suggested adding another shooting day to the film "to help [Williams] give a better performance". "Let's do this Randall. I'm not going for the A's or the B's. I’m going for something between C and B. I don't like Ds," wrote Pacino, "And, as long as you put the effort in with what you know about filmmaking and Michael too I'm sure we'll get to a B−. And that's good enough for me, if it's good enough for you." Pacino also complained that Williams was interfering with director Michael Polish's editing process. "My thought Randall is very simple. She is not a professional. ... Someone has to say 'back off a second dear, we're completing the film still, take a look when it's ready'," Pacino wrote to Emmett.

== Personal life ==
She was married to her first husband until 2010. In 2010, she married Gerald Kessler, a vitamin tycoon multi-millionaire. Kessler died in 2015 and she inherited almost all of his $800 million estate, which was the subject of legal action by Kessler's children from his previous marriage.

== Filmography ==
=== Film ===
Year	Title	Role	Notes
1989	The Nutzoids at Cannibal Cove	Bitsy	
1994	Turn of the Blade	Calendar Girl	
1994	Beverly Hills Cop III	Spider Rider	
1994	The Mask	Pebbles	
1995	Apollo 13	Kim	
1995	Virtual Seduction	Hostess	Television film
2000	The Extreme Adventures of Super Dave	Girl Driver	
2001	Soulkeeper	Buxom Babe	
2003	The Box	Dancer	
2004	Uh Oh!	Tara	
2004	Miss Cast Away	Flight Attendant	Television film
2008	Jack Rio	Andrea Shane	Also producer
2008	Skeletons in the Desert	Casey Stevens	Also producer
2010	Light Years Away	Misty	
2010	Raven	Raven	Also producer
2011	Mysteria	Lavinia	
2011	Sebastian	Miranda Barnes	
2013	The Harvest	Sandra	Also producer
2014	Reclaim	Barmaid	
2014	Reach Me	Phyllis	
2016	Officer Downe	Mother Supreme	
2017	The Intruders	Lily	Also producer and writer
2018	Den of Thieves	Holly	Also executive producer
2018	Backtrace	Erin	Also executive producer
2019	After	Professor Soto	Also producer
2019	10 Minutes Gone	Claire	Also executive producer
2019	Escape Plan: The Extractors		Executive producer
2020	Boss Level	Pam	Also executive producer
2020	Broken Soldier	Mrs. Ancilla	
2020	A Place Among the Dead	Alex	
2021	American Traitor: The Trial of Axis Sally	Mildred Gillars	Also producer
2021	Aileen Wuornos: American Boogeywoman	Diane Pittman	Also producer
2022	Savage Salvation	Detective Zeppelin	
2023	The Donor Party	Barbara	
2023	Confidential Informant	Jenny Sullivan	
2024	Outlaw Posse	Aphrodite	Also executive producer
2024	Rust	Ellsworth Madam	
2025	Den of Thieves 2: Pantera	Holly	Also executive producer
2025	High Rollers	Penelope	
2025	The Ritual	Sister Sarah	
2025	World Breaker	Soldier Coffey	
TBA	Eternity	Katrine	Also producer
TBA	Vivien & the Florist	Nurse Jeanette	Also executive producer
TBA	The Him		Executive producer

=== Television ===
Year	Title	Role	Notes
1993	Murder, She Wrote	Michele	Episode: "The Sound of Murder"
1994	Murder, She Wrote	Docent	Episode: "A Nest of Vipers"
1995	Dream On	Tina	Episode: "Try Not to Remember"
1995	The Larry Sanders Show	Woman	Episode: "Hank's Sex Tape"
1996	Campus Cops	Cindy	Episode: "Muskrat Ramble"
1996	Married... with Children	Angela	Episode: "Spring Break: Part 2"
1999	NewsRadio	Julie	Episode: "Apartment"
2017–present	The Bay	Silver	Recurring role, also executive producer Daytime Emmy Award for Outstanding Digital Daytime Drama Series (2017, 2020); Nominated — Daytime Emmy Award for Outstanding Limited Drama Series (2021)
