= Mysteria (film) =

- DVD cover
- Directed by: Lucius C. Kuert
- Written by: Lucius C. Kuert
- Produced by: Rafael Primorac; Robert Miano; Marlon Parry; Gerald Kessler; Matt Ilczuk; Sean Dubravac
- Starring: Danny Glover; Billy Zane; Robert Miano; Martin Landau; Meadow Williams; Michael Rooker; Peter Mark Richman
- Cinematography: Keith L. Smith
- Edited by: Lucius C. Kuert
- Release date: October 23, 2011 (Beverly Hills)
- Country: United States
- Language: English

Mysteria is a 2011 American thriller film directed by a Swiss director, Lucius C. Kuert, and starring Robert Miano, Billy Zane, Danny Glover, Meadow Williams and Martin Landau.

== Plot ==
A once famous and now washed-up Hollywood screenwriter is fighting to finish his latest script with an unrealistic deadline. He finds himself in the center of a murder investigation involving a prominent politician's wife. The surrounding events feed him inspiration for his script.

== Cast ==
- Robert Miano as Aleister
- Billy Zane as Producer
- Danny Glover as Investigator
- Meadow Williams as Lavinia
- Martin Landau as Hotel Manager
- Michael Rooker as Captain McCarthy
- Carlucci Weyant as Jack
