= Phillip Rhee =

South Korean actor

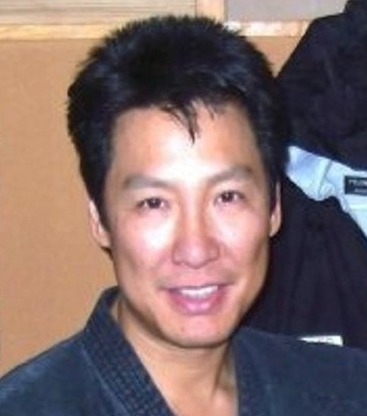
- Philip Rhee in 2008
- Born: Phillip Rhee; September 7, 1960 (age 66)
- Occupation: Actor
- Years active: 1977-present

Phillip Rhee (born September 7, 1960) is a South Korean American martial artist, actor, director, screenwriter, and film producer, best known for his role as Tommy Lee in the 1989 American martial arts film Best of the Best, and its sequels Best of the Best 2 (1993), Best of the Best 3: No Turning Back (1995), and Best of the Best 4: Without Warning (1998). Rhee's 1980 representation of the United States' Taekwondo Team against the South Korean team in the championships of the Asia Games formed the basis of his screenplay for the film Best of the Best.

Rhee has advanced training in taekwondo (sixth-degree black belt), hapkido (third-degree black belt), wing chun and boxing.

== Life and career ==
Rhee was born in South Korea and raised in San Francisco, California. He is a martial artist, actor, director and film producer who has created, produced and starred in numerous films including the Best of the Best film series. The first Best of the Best film spawned three sequels: Best of the Best 2, Best of the Best 3: No Turning Back and Best of the Best 4: Without Warning.

== Family ==
Philip's brother Simon is also a martial artist and actor; Simon co-starred in the Best of the Best films and runs a taekwondo studio in Woodland Hills, California.

In 1990, Philip Rhee married his wife Amy, a former actress and model in Korea. Their son Sean appeared in his father's 2015 film Underdog Kids and is a professional stuntman.

Rhee announced in August 2025 plans to make the fifth installment of the Best of the Best series, "Best of the Best: Honor the Brave."

== Filmography ==
- 1977 The Kentucky Fried Movie Klahn's Guard (segment "A Fistful of Yen")
- 1983 Firefight (short)
- 1984 Furious
- 1985 Crime Killer
- 1985 L.A. Streetfighters
- 1985 Hell Squad
- 1988 Silent Assassins
- 1989 Best of the Best — also producer and storywriter
- 1993 Best of the Best 2 — also producer
- 1995 Best of the Best 3: No Turning Back — also director and producer
- 1998 Best of the Best 4: Without Warning — also director, producer and screenwriter
- 2015 Underdog Kids — also director, producer and screenwriter
- 2017 Two Bellmen Three (short)

== Personal life ==
He has advanced black belts in Taekwondo (sixth dan) and Hapkido (third dan) and trained in Wing Chun and Boxing.
