= Kenny Powers =

Kenny Powers is the name of:

- Kenny Powers (stuntman) (1947–2009), American stuntman
- Kenny Powers (character), character in HBO series Eastbound & Down

== See also ==
- Powers (disambiguation)
