= Best of the Best II =

1993 film

- Theatrical release poster
- Directed by: Robert Radler
- Written by: Max Strom; John Allen Nelson
- Produced by: Phillip Rhee; Peter Strauss
- Starring: Eric Roberts; Phillip Rhee; Christopher Penn; Ralph Moeller; Wayne Newton
- Cinematography: Fred Tammes
- Edited by: Bert Lovitt; Florent Retz
- Music by: David Michael Frank
- Production companies: The Movie Group; Picture Securities Ltd.
- Distributed by: 20th Century Fox
- Release date: March 5, 1993
- Running time: 101 minutes
- Country: United States
- Language: English
- Budget: $7 million
- Box office: $6,044,652

Best of the Best II is a 1993 martial arts film directed by Robert Radler, and starring Eric Roberts and Phillip Rhee. It is the first sequel to the 1989 film Best of the Best. The plot follows four of the characters from the original film.

== Plot ==
After returning home from South Korea, three members of the U.S. National Team set up a martial arts studio in Las Vegas. Travis Brickley has been secretly competing at "The Coliseum", a brutal underground fighting arena managed by Weldon Mardano, whose protégé Gustave Brakus is the venue's owner and undefeated champion. Ordinarily a challenger must defeat three of its "Gladiators" in order to face Brakus, but Travis challenges Brakus outright. Amused by Travis's arrogance, Weldon grants his wish.

Alex Grady's eleven-year-old son Walter begins testing for his black belt, but falls short. When his father makes an impassioned speech praising his son for his maturity, Walter cancels his babysitter. Alex insists that Walter accompany Travis to his bowling league. Travis reveals his secret to Walter, who blackmails Travis into letting him watch the fight with Brakus. Brakus pummels Travis and breaks his neck, killing him.

Walter runs home and alerts his father and Tommy Lee, and together they proceed to the dance club which serves as a front for the Coliseum. They are intercepted by Weldon, who claims that Travis left the Coliseum on his own. Tommy searches the city until the police find Travis's body floating in the river along with his damaged car, the apparent result of an auto accident.

Alex and Tommy return to the club and confront Brakus, who admits to killing Travis. Tommy connects with a punch that sends Brakus crashing into a mirror, scarring his cheek before security arrives, forcing Alex and Tommy to fight their way out of the building. Brakus then condemns Alex and his son to death, but orders Weldon's henchmen to bring Tommy back alive.

At Travis's funeral, Alex and Tommy are startled by the appearance of Dae-han Park, Tommy's old rival from South Korea, and adopted brother. Still owing a debt to Tommy for sparing his life, Dae-han pledges his help to bring Travis's killer to justice, which Tommy politely declines. Alex petitions his girlfriend Sue MacCauley (Meg Foster), who works as a sportscaster at the local news station, to investigate and bring Travis's murder to light. But with no substantial proof of the crime, she regretfully tells him that she cannot do so.

While riding his bike home from school, Walter is tailed by a black automobile. He returns home to warn his father and Tommy, but they come under attack by a group of armed men. After fending them off, they pack up and head out of town to seek refuge with Tommy's Native American grandmother Lee. There they encounter Tommy's uncle James Lee, a once-promising fighter whose career was ruined due to a clash with Brakus. Claiming to know how to defeat him, James begins to train Alex and Tommy.

Their training is interrupted when Weldon's henchmen track them down. James tries to intervene but is shot to death. While Tommy is forced into the waiting helicopter, Alex and the others are herded back into the house. As Weldon's men prepare to execute them and blow up the house, Walter provides a distraction which enables Alex to overpower the gunman. Tommy's grandmother prompts Alex to fire four shots to signal their deaths, at which point the thugs set fire to the gasoline trail, causing a massive explosion. After emerging from the basement unharmed, Alex leaves Walter with Sue, then recruits Dae-han and his Korean teammates Sae-jin Kwon and Yung Kim to storm the Coliseum and rescue Tommy.

At the Coliseum, Tommy fights his way through the Gladiators which include a British boxer known as "The Hammer", the Greek wrestler Stavros, and the Mongolian fighter Khan (Myung Kue Kim), but is outmatched by Brakus. As Brakus prepares to finish him, Alex breaks into the arena, his presence giving Tommy a second wind. A barrage of kicks send Brakus to the canvas, and Tommy warns him to stay down. But Brakus does not comply, leaving Tommy no choice but to break his neck, killing him.

With his champion dead, Weldon announces Tommy as the new owner of the Coliseum and invites him to say a few words to the audience. Tommy takes the microphone and declares the Coliseum closed. When Weldon protests, Alex silences him with an elbow to the face. Alex and Tommy leave the arena and turn off the lights.

== Cast ==
- Eric Roberts as Alex Grady
- Phillip Rhee as Tommy Lee
- Chris Penn as Travis Brickley
- Edan Gross as Walter Grady
- Ralf Moeller as Gustave Brakus
- Claire Stansfield as Greta Brakus
- Stefanos Miltsakakis as Stavros
- Myung Kue Kim as Khan
- Alex Desir as Andre Marais
- Lionel Washington as "The Hammer"
- Meg Foster as Sue MacCauley
- Sonny Landham as James Lee
- Wayne Newton as Weldon Mardano
- Patrick Kilpatrick as Finch
- Mike Genovese as Gus
- Betty Carvalho as Grandma Lee
- Frank Salsedo as Charlie
- Simon Rhee as Dae-han Park
- Hayward Nishioka as Sae-jin Kwon
- Ken Nagayama as Yung Kim
- Nicholas Worth as "Sick Humor"
- Manny Perry as Gunman In Desert
- Kane Hodder as Backdoor Man
- Edward Bunker as Spotlight Operator
- Cristy Thom as Girl In Restaurant
- Michael Treanor as Karate Student (uncredited)
- David Boreanaz as Parking Valet (uncredited)

== Music ==
=== Soundtrack ===
- "World Destiny" (Performed by Rave Crusader)
- "Paranoid" (Performed by Angel Ice)
- "Je N'Aime Que Toi" (Performed by Angel Ice)
- "Down for the Count" (Performed by Mark Yoakam)
- "Guilty" (Performed by Public Nuisance)
- "Willie Rise" (Performed by Lil D & Big C)
- "Everybody Loves a Winner" (Performed by William Bell)
- "No Guts, No Glory" (Performed by Jeff Steele)
- "(To Be) The Best of the Best" (Performed by Mark Free)

== Reception ==
=== Box office ===
Best of the Best II was a box office flop, earning only $6,607,218.

=== Critical response ===
It received mostly negative reviews from critics, but few positive ones. As a result, further sequels were not given a theatrical release. The movie was a success on the VHS-to-rentals market following its theatre release, and it was this success that spawned two sequels that similarly found their niche in the direct-to-video market.

On Rotten Tomatoes, the film has a rating of 10% based on 10 reviews with an average rating of 3.3/10. Film historian Leonard Maltin gave the film a negative review, but also said, "[it] actually improves on its lame predecessor, which appallingly wasted its top-drawer cast." Returning star Eric Roberts said that he made this film to improve on the original.

== Sequel ==
A sequel titled Best of the Best 3: No Turning Back was released in 1995.

== In popular culture ==
In 1996, the World Wrestling Federation introduced a character called "Brakus". The character was portrayed by German bodybuilder-turned-wrestler Achim Albrecht.
