= María Conchita Alonso =

Cuban singer (born 1955)

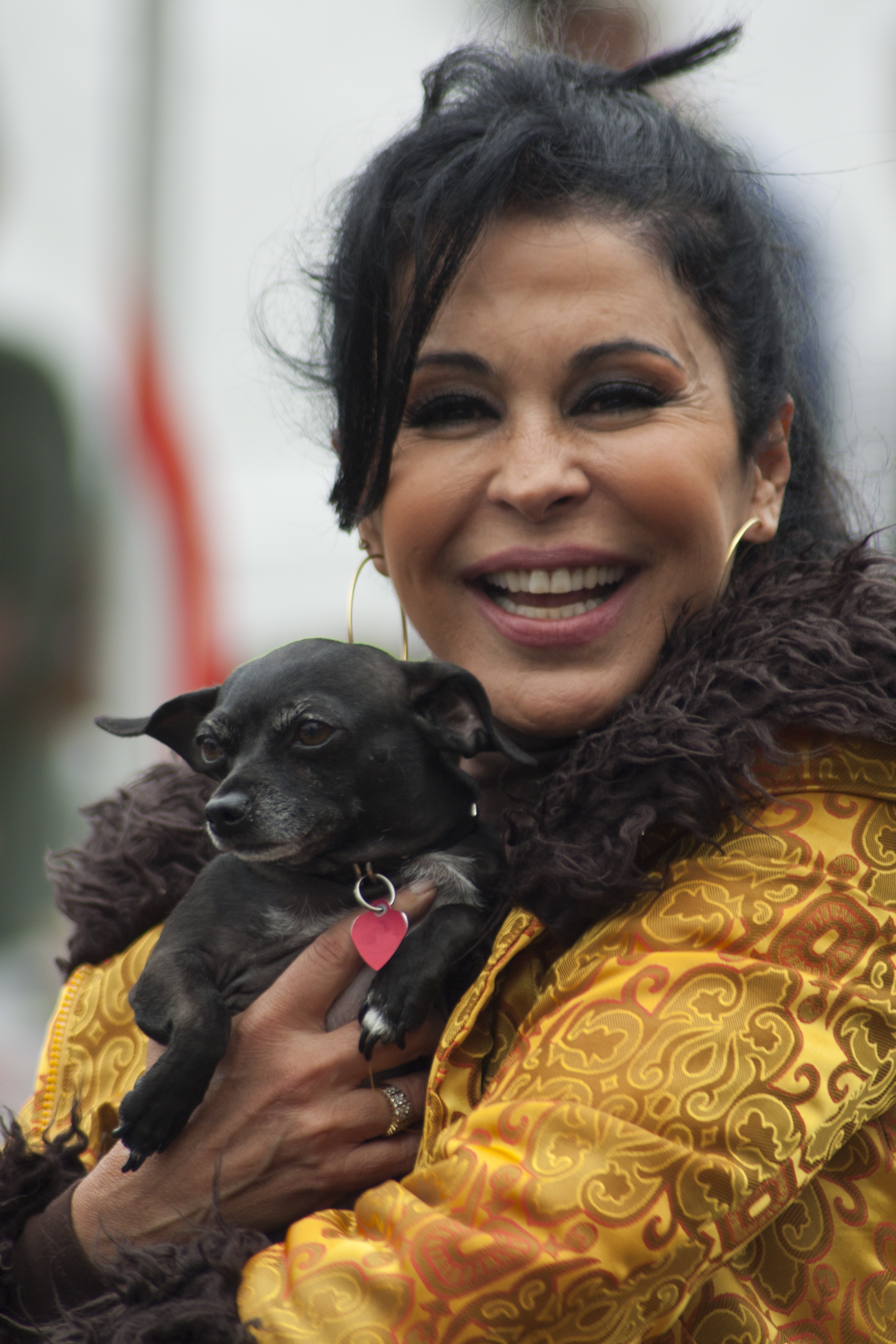
- Alonso in 2011
- Born: María Concepción Alonso Bustillo; June 29, 1955 (age 71); Cienfuegos, Cuba
- Citizenship: Cuba; Venezuela; United States
- Occupations: Singer; actress
- Relatives: Antonella Alonso (niece)
- Beauty pageant titleholder
- Title: Miss World Venezuela 1975
- Years active: 1971–present
- Major competitions: Miss World Venezuela 1975 (1st Runner Up); Miss World 1975 (Top 7)
- Musical career
- Genres: Latin pop; adult contemporary; dance-pop; pop rock

María Concepción Alonso Bustillo (born June 29, 1955), known professionally as María Conchita Alonso, is a Cuban-born Venezuelan-American actress and singer whose career spans film, television, music, and theater. She gained international recognition for her role as Amber Mendez in the 1987 film The Running Man, and was nominated for the Independent Spirit Award for Best Female Lead for her performance in Caught (1996). As a recording artist, she has received several gold and platinum albums and three Grammy Award nominations.

Alonso was one of the first Latin American entertainers to achieve mainstream success in both Spanish- and English-language media. In 1995, she became the first Latin American actress not born in the United States to star in a Broadway musical, playing Aurora in Kiss of the Spider Woman. Before her entertainment career, she was a beauty pageant titleholder who represented Venezuela at Miss World 1975, placing among the top seven finalists.

Born in Cuba and raised in Venezuela, Alonso has been active in both Latin American and U.S. entertainment industries since the 1970s. In later years, she became known for her outspoken political views and public support for conservative causes in the United States.

== Early life ==
María Conchita Alonso was born in Cienfuegos, Cuba, on June 29, 1955, to Ricardo Alonso and Conchita Bustillo. Her family moved to Venezuela when she was five years old in 1962 after the Cuban Revolution. She was crowned Miss Teenager World in 1971. She was runner up for Miss Venezuela in 1975, and became a top seven runner-up in the Miss World pageant later that year, which was won by Puerto Rico's Wilnelia Merced.

== Career ==
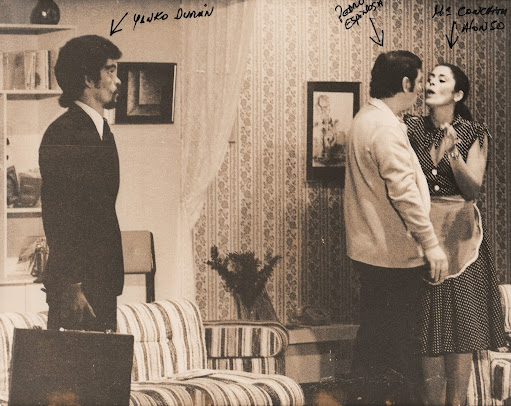
Alonso in the stage production of Cuidado con el de los Cuernos in Venezuela. Circa 1981

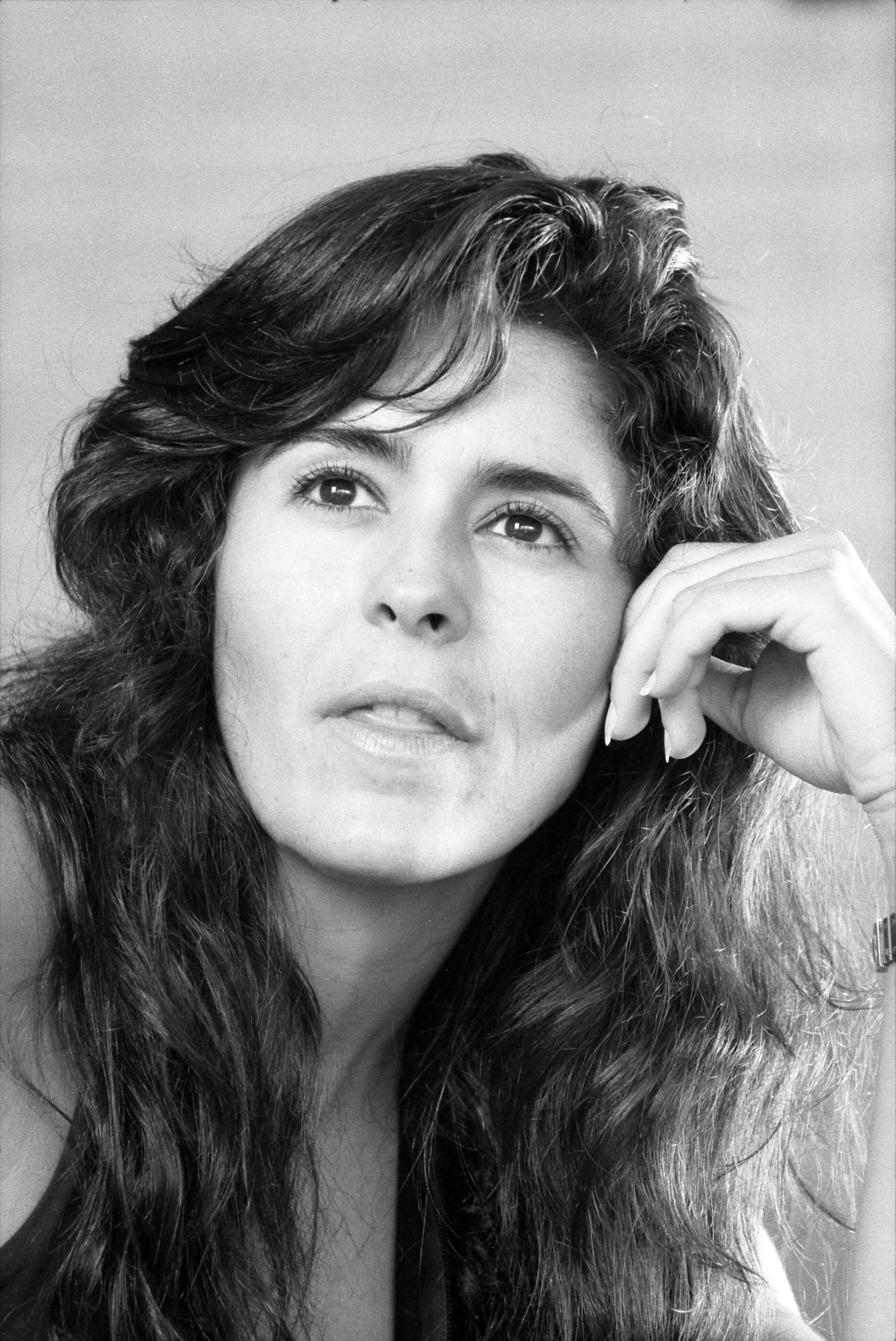
Alonso in 1986

Alonso's first gold album and number one song on the charts was Love Maniac, released in 1979 under the name Ámbar. After that followed her second number-one "The Witch" and soon after "Dangerous Rhythm". For what is considered her best known song, she was asked by Giorgio Moroder to write the lyrics in Spanish and sing "Vamos a Bailar" which he had written for the soundtrack of the film Scarface. The song instantly became a classic among Spanish speakers, despite failing to garner major attention outside of Cuba where it was recorded. Her two albums with Ámbar and her solo debut were recorded in English. Her second album, María Conchita, in 1984, made her an international singing star in the Spanish-speaking market, and garnered her first of three Grammy Award nominations (1985, 1988, 1994).

Alonso sang the United States national anthem at the FIFA UNICEF charity match on July 27, 1986, at the Rose Bowl in Pasadena, California, in front of a crowd of 57,539. The game was between the “Rest of the World” and “The Americas” which featured Diego Maradona only one month after his successful 1986 World Cup win.

Alonso made her Hollywood film debut in Moscow on the Hudson (1984) with Robin Williams, and also starred in Touch and Go (1986), Extreme Prejudice (1987), The Running Man (1987), Colors (1988) with Sean Penn, Vampire's Kiss (1989), Predator 2 (1990) and The House of the Spirits (1993).

In 1995, she became the first Latin-born actresses to star in a Broadway show, playing Aurora in Kiss of the Spider Woman. She later acted in the romantic comedies Chasing Papi (2003) and The Last Guy on Earth (2006).

Alonso was cast to play Lucía, the mother of Gabrielle Solis, on the ABC series Desperate Housewives. The episode aired on February 19, 2006. She was in the Latin version, Amas de Casa Desesperadas, for Univision Network. She was a guest star in the live-action film of the comic book El Muerto and appeared in the film Material Girls (2006).

Alonso hosted VH1's ¡Viva Hollywood! on April 13, 2008, with Carlos Ponce. She portrayed Sam in the werewolf horror film Wolf Moon, directed by Dana Mennie.

Alonso appeared in Rob Zombie's The Lords of Salem, released in 2013. Her latest film, a fantasy short titled The Secret of Joy, features her alongside fellow Venezuelan actor Carlos Antonio León, Spanish actress Laura Bayonas, and Brazilian actress Ana Carolina Da Fonseca in a story that aims to bring awareness about pediatric cancer.

Maria Conchita signed with management firm All Parts Move in 2023. She is currently (2025) touring extensively as part of the 'Despechadas' tour in Mexico, with solo performances and a cabaret style show called 'Sin Verguenza', which goes into her life and her ups and downs. A new 'Tropical' - a first for her - album is scheduled for release in the fall of 2025, produced by Latin Grammy winning producer Fabian Rincon, with a first single 'Acariciame Salsa' out June 27, 2025.

== Political views ==
Alonso has often spoken in support of LGBT rights and in appreciation of her LGBT fans, stating, "I was very much supported by the community when I first came out with my music". In a 2004 article, she compared herself to Cher in terms of her connection to LGBT culture.

Alonso was an outspoken critic of Cuba's Fidel Castro and Venezuelan President Hugo Chávez, whom she described as a "dictator"-like "Hitler" and whose voters and supporters she described as "terrorists." She appeared on Sean Hannity's Hannity's America on May 6, 2007, Hannity & Colmes on June 1, 2007 and Bill O'Reilly's The O'Reilly Factor on August 13, 2007, and March 11, 2009.

Alonso issued an "Open Letter to Sean Penn" (the two had played lovers in the 1988 movie Colors) online on March 29, 2010, regarding his support of Hugo Chávez. She used a point-by-point refrain of "WHY" in her letter questioning various issues occurring in Venezuela. In December 2011, she got into a heated exchange with Penn at a Los Angeles airport during which Penn called her a pig and she responded by calling Penn a communist.

In 2008, Alonso endorsed the US presidential campaign of Republican nominee John McCain, writing:

As a Latina and a new American citizen, I believe in this country and its people, and I believe that we need more than just "change." We need a leader who can bring about the right kind of change, and John McCain has the experience and judgment necessary to lead us in these uncertain times. I grew up in Cuba and Venezuela, and I am appalled that Barack Obama apparently wants to emulate the "spread the wealth" economic policies of those countries and negotiate with their leaders.

In an August 2012 Spreecast interview, Alonso stated her opposition to Obama's re-election, saying that if reelected, he would take steps to make the United States become more like Venezuela under the Chávez government.

In January 2014, Alonso resigned from a San Francisco production of The Vagina Monologues after appearing in an advertisement for Republican candidate for Governor Tim Donnelly.

Alonso is a supporter of Donald Trump and endorsed him in the 2020 presidential election.

== Filmography ==
Year	Film	Role	Notes
1978	Savana – Sesso e diamanti	Margaret Johnson	Italian B movie
1979	Solon		
1979	Estefanía	Silvana Cataldo	TV series
1979	Mabel Valdez, periodista		TV series
1980	Natalia de 8 a 9	Mariana Brito	TV series
1980	Mi hijo Gabriel		TV series
1980	El Esposo de Anaís		TV series
1980	Claudia	Claudia	TV series
1981	Marielena	Marielena	TV series
1981	Angelito		TV series
1981	Luz Marina	Luz Marina	TV series
1982	Fantasy Island	French Girl	1 episode
1982	Knight Rider	Marie Elena Casafranca	1 episode; credited as Maria Conchita
1983	Nacho	Herself	TV series
1984	Moscow on the Hudson	Lucia Lombardo	
1984	Fear City	"Silver" Chavez	as Maria Conchita
1986	A Fine Mess	Claudia Pazzo	a.k.a. Blake Edwards' A Fine Mess (USA: complete title)
1986	Touch and Go	Denise DeLeon	
1987	Il cugino americano	Caterina Ammirati	a.k.a. Blood Ties (USA: TV title)
1987	Extreme Prejudice	Sarita Cisneros	
1987	The Running Man	Amber Mendez	
1988	Con el Corazón en la Mano		
1988	Colors	Louisa Gomez	
1989	One of the Boys	Maria Conchita Navarro	6 episodes
1989	Vampire's Kiss	Alva Restrepo	
1990	Predator 2	LAPD Detective Leona Cantrell	
1991	Sesame Street	Herself	1 episode
1991	Cuerpos clandestinos (TV)	Claudia	
1991	McBain	Christina Santos	
1992	Teamster Boss: The Jackie Presser Story (TV)	Carmen De La Portilla-Presser	a.k.a. Power Play: The Jackie Presser Story (UK: video title)
1993	Roosters	Chata	
1993	The House of the Spirits	Tránsito Soto	
1994	Alejandra	Alejandra Martínez	TV series
1994	Texas (TV)	Lucia	a.k.a. James A. Michener's Texas
1994	MacShayne: The Final Roll of the Dice (TV)	Cindy Evans	
1996	Caught	Betty	a.k.a. Atrapados (USA: Spanish title)
1996	For Which He Stands	Theresa Rochetti	
1996	Sudden Terror: The Hijacking of School Bus #17	Marta Caldwell	
1997	Women: Stories of Passion	Sophia	1 episode
1997	Chicago Hope	Emma Scull	2 episodes
1997	Robert Altman's Gun	Marti	1 episode
1997	Catherine's Grove	Charley Vasquez	
1997	F/X: The Series	Elena Serrano	2 episodes
1997	Acts of Betrayal	Eva Ramirez	
1998	Exposé	Nancy Drake	a.k.a. Footsteps (Philippines: English title) (USA: working title)
1998	Blackheart	Annette	
1998	The Nanny	Concepcion Sheffield	1 episode
1998	The Outer Limits	Marie Alexander	Episode: "The Vaccine"
1998	El Grito en el cielo	Miranda Vega	a.k.a. Shout Out (USA: festival title)
1998	My Husband's Secret Life (TV)	Toni Diaz	
1999	Touched by an Angel	Dr. Sandra Pena	1 episode
1999	Dillinger in Paradise	Lola	
2000	Chain of Command	Vice President Gloria Valdez	
2000	Amantes de luna llena		
2000	Knockout	Carmen Alvarado	
2000	A Vision of Murder: The Story of Donielle (TV)	Gloria	
2000	Best Actress (TV)	Maria Katarina Caldone	
2000	High Noon (TV)	Helen Ramirez	
2000	Twice in a Lifetime	Kat Lopez	1 episode
2000	The Princess & the Barrio Boy (TV)	Minerva Rojas	a.k.a. She's in Love (UK)
2001	The Code conspiracy	Rachel	
2001	Resurrection Blvd.	Julia Hernandez	3 episodes
2001	Birth of Babylon	Lupe Velez	
2002	Blind Heat	Adrianna Scott	
2002	Robbery Homicide Division	Claudia	1 episode
2003	The Company You Keep	Vera	
2003	Kingpin	Ariela	TV series
2003	Heart of America	Mrs. Jones	a.k.a. Home Room (Australia)
2003	Chasing Papi	Maria	
2003	Newton's Law		
2004	CSI: Miami	Marisela Gonzalez	1 episode: Blood Moon
2005	English as a Second Language	Consuelo Sara	
2005	La Academia USA	Judge	
2005	Smoke	Aurora Avila	
2006	Desperate Housewives	Lucía Márquez	1 episode
2006	Material Girls	Inez	
2007	The Dead One	Sister Rosa	
2007	The Condor (V)	Mrs. Valdez (voice)	a.k.a. Stan Lee Presents: The Condor (USA: DVD box title)
2007	Saints & Sinners	Diana Martin	62 episodes
2008	Richard III	Queen Elizabeth	
2008	Tranced	Libra	
2008	The Art of Travel	Mrs. Layne	
2008	The Red Canvas	Maria Sanchez	
2008	Two Minutes Of Hate		Dos minutos de odio
2008	Unauthorized Clifford		Des-Autorizado (Venezuela: wide-release title)
2009	Maneater (miniseries)	Alejandra Alpert	Two episodes
2009	Dark Moon Rising	Sheriff Samantha "Sam" Pantoja	
2009	Spread	Ingrid	
2011	Without Men	Lucrecia	
2012	Lords of Salem	Alice Matthias	
2014	Return to Babylon	Lupe Vélez	
2016	November Rule	Ms. Luisa	
2017	Kill 'Em All	FBI Agent Sanders	
2018	Off the Menu	Cordelia Torres	
2018	El señor de los cielos	Nora Requena	
2019	¡He matado a mi marido!	Remedios	
2019	The I-Land	Mrs. Chase	Miniseries
2019	Into the Dark	Bea	1 episode ("Good Boy")
2021	Take Me to Tarzana	Juanita	
2024	Kill 'Em All 2	FBI Agent Sanders	

== Discography ==
Studio albums

- Love Maniac (1979)
- The Witch (1980)
- Dangerous Rhythm (1982)
- Te Amo/I Love You (1983)
- María Conchita (1984)
- O Ella, o Yo (1985)
- Mírame (1987)
- Hazme Sentir (1990)
- Imagíname (1992)
- Boleros (Alejandra) (1994)
- Amor De Madrugada (2016)
- Lléname de Ti (2020)

Live albums

- En Vivo en México (1992)

Compilation albums

- Lo mejor de (1986)
- Grandes éxitos (1989)
- Súper hits (1991)
- De colección (1994)
- Hoy y siempre (1997)
- Lo mejor de María Conchita Alonso (2000)
- La más completa colección (2005)
- Grandes éxitos/Greatest hits (2006)
- 16 Éxitos de oro (2012)
- Reina Eterna (2017)

== Singles ==
Year	Song	Hot Latin Songs	Album
1987	"Suéltame"	22	Grandes Éxitos
1987	"Otra Mentira Más"	24	Mírame
1988	"Y Es Que Llegaste Tú"	5	Mírame
1990	"Hazme sentir"	24	Hazme Sentir
1991	"A Él Lo Quiero"	35	Hazme Sentir
1993	"Promesas"	20	Imagíname
2019	"Ya No Más"	–	¡He matado a mi marido! - Soundtrack
2020	"Llename De Ti"	–	"Llename De Ti" single
