= Best of the Best 3: No Turning Back =

1995 American martial arts film

- DVD cover
- Directed by: Phillip Rhee
- Written by: Barry Gray; Deborah Scott
- Produced by: Phillip Rhee; Peter Strauss
- Starring: Phillip Rhee; Christopher McDonald; Gina Gershon; Mark Rolston; Peter Simmons; Dee Wallace Stone
- Cinematography: Jerry Watson
- Edited by: Bert Lovitt
- Music by: Barry Goldberg
- Production companies: The Movie Group; Picture Securities Ltd.
- Distributed by: Dimension Films
- Release date: May 17, 1995
- Running time: 90 minutes
- Country: United States
- Language: English

Best of the Best 3: No Turning Back is a 1995 American martial arts action film directed by the film's star Phillip Rhee. It is the sequel to the Best of the Best II (1993). It is the third installment in the Best of the Best film series. The film co-stars Christopher McDonald, Gina Gershon, Dee Wallace and an uncredited R. Lee Ermey. Rhee's Tommy Lee returns to his small hometown to find it under siege by a neo-Nazi gang whose leader is played by Mark Rolston.

== Plot ==
In the small town of Liberty, a vicious group of neo-Nazis terrorizes the populace, most recently murdering an African-American pastor and setting fire to his church. While visiting his sister and brother-in-law in Liberty, Tommy Lee (Phillip Rhee) crosses paths with the group's leader Donnie Hansen (Mark Rolston), and is drawn into the conflict when his sister is attacked in their car. Later, the group attempts to harass schoolteacher Margo Preston (Gina Gershon) at a 4-H fair, but Tommy intervenes and fends them off. Ungrateful at first, she eventually warms up to Tommy when they are set up on a blind date. They start a relationship.

Meanwhile, the town holds hearings on whether to sell a parcel of land on the outskirts of town to the neo-Nazis, who have set up their headquarters on the land. Margo and Tommy join the residents and persuade the town council to reject the land sale, which means the neo-Nazis soon must vacate the premises.

After this defeat, the neo-Nazis arm themselves and assault Tommy's family. After saving Margo from an attempted rape, Tommy returns home to find his sister badly beaten. He and his brother-in-law, town sheriff Jack Banning (Christopher McDonald), decide to take matters into their own hands and invade the group's heavily guarded base, where Jack's children have been taken hostage. After a climactic fight, the children are rescued and Tommy defeats Hansen in single combat, but refuses to kill him, knowing that it would only further his message of hatred. As Tommy turns away, Hansen takes aim at him with a rifle, prompting teenager Owen Tucker (Peter Simmons) to shoot and kill Hansen, thus brokering a new peace in the town. The ending scene shows the murdered pastor's child reading from the Bible and the church being rebuilt.

== Cast ==
- Phillip Rhee as Tommy Lee
- Christopher McDonald as Sheriff Jack Banning
- Gina Gershon as Margo Preston
- Mark Rolston as Donnie Hansen
- Peter Simmons as Owen Tucker
- Cristina Lawson as Karen Banning
- Kitao Sakurai as Justin Banning
- Dee Wallace as Georgia Tucker
- Michael Bailey Smith as "Tiny"
- Cole S. McKay as Bo
- Barbara Boyd as Isabel Jackson
- Justin Brentley as Luther Phelps Jr.
- Andra R. Ward as Reverend Luther Phelps Sr.
- John Robert Thompson as Mayor Wilson
- R. Lee Ermey as Preacher Brian (uncredited)
- David Rody as Arms Dealer
- Kane Hodder as Neo Nazi Gunman
- Mark Kreuzman as Random Neo Nazi
- Jerra Nicol Wisecup (Thompson) as Teenage Girl In Choir
- John E. Blazier as Trucker / Neo Nazi
- David Brown as skinhead

== Reception ==
=== Critical response ===
Andy Webb of The Movie Scene gave it 2 stars out of 5, saying the film "feels quite corny", and that "with plenty of over the top action and cringe worthy comedy [the film] just doesn't work".

The film received a 15 certificate in the United Kingdom.

== Sequel ==
A sequel titled Best of the Best 4: Without Warning was released in 1998.
