= Best of the Best 4: Without Warning =

1998 American martial arts film

- Promotional release poster
- Directed by: Phillip Rhee
- Written by: Phillip Rhee; Fred Vicarel
- Produced by: Phillip Rhee; Peter Strauss
- Starring: Phillip Rhee; Ernie Hudson; Tobin Bell; Jessica Collins; Thure Riefenstein; Paul Gleason; Art LaFleur; Christopher Lemmon
- Cinematography: Michael Margulies
- Edited by: Bert Lovitt
- Music by: David Grant
- Production company: Picture Securities Ltd.
- Distributed by: Dimension Home Video (Buena Vista Home Entertainment)
- Release date: October 20, 1998
- Running time: 90 minutes
- Country: United States
- Language: English

Best of the Best 4: Without Warning is a 1998 American martial arts action film written and directed by the film's star, Phillip Rhee. It is the sequel to the Best of the Best 3: No Turning Back (1995). The film co-stars Ernie Hudson, Tobin Bell, Paul Gleason, and Sven-Ole Thorsen.

== Plot ==
A group of Russian mobsters have stolen a huge supply of paper for printing U.S. currency, and are now flooding the market with counterfeit bills. When a young woman named Mickey (Jill Ritchie) working for the mobsters decides to turn herself in and hand over a data CD to the police, she is shot and killed, but not before handing the disc to an unsuspecting Tommy Lee (Phillip Rhee). Despite working with the police as a martial arts instructor, Lee doesn't go to the cops with the disc, but instead goes on the run, giving the mafia time to kidnap his daughter Stephanie (Jessica Huang) to hold as a hostage in exchange for the disc. When Lee catches the mobsters fleeing in a C130, he raises himself on a fire engine and casts the mobster's own bomb into the plane as landing gear doors close.

== Cast ==
- Phillip Rhee as Tommy Lee
- Ernie Hudson as Detective Gresko
- Tobin Bell as Lukasz Slava
- Paul Gleason as Father Gil
- Art LaFleur as "Big Joolie"
- Jessica Collins as Karina
- Chris Lemmon as Detective Jack Jarvis
- Sven-Ole Thorsen as Boris
- Jessica Huang as Stephanie Lee
- Thure Riefenstein as Yuri Slava
- Jill Ritchie as Mickey, Big Joolie's Daughter
- Ilia Volok as Ilia
- Garrett Warren as Viktor
- David Fralick as Oleg
- Monte Perlin as Sergei
