= Kill 'Em All (film) =

- Official DVD cover
- Directed by: Peter Malota
- Screenplay by: Craig Stewart; Brian Smolensky; Jesse Cilio
- Story by: Craig Stewart
- Produced by: Rafael Primorac; Richard Salvatore
- Starring: Jean-Claude Van Damme; Autumn Reeser; Peter Stormare
- Cinematography: Mark Rutledge
- Edited by: Yvan Gauthier
- Music by: Aldo Shllaku
- Production companies: Arramis Films; Destination Films; ITN Films; Kill 'Em All Productions; March On Productions
- Distributed by: Destination Films
- Release date: June 6, 2017 (US)
- Running time: 96 minutes
- Country: United States
- Languages: English; Albanian

Kill 'Em All is a 2017 American direct-to-video action film directed by Peter Malota, and starring Jean-Claude Van Damme, Autumn Reeser and Peter Stormare. A sequel titled Kill 'Em All 2 was released direct-to-video on September 24, 2024.

== Plot ==
An unidentified man arrives at a local hospital, seriously wounded. He is taken care of by a devoted nurse, Suzanne. Things take a turn for the worse when an international gang invades the hospital to kill him.

== Cast ==
- Jean-Claude Van Damme as Philip
- Autumn Reeser as Suzanne
- Peter Stormare as CIA Agent Holman
- María Conchita Alonso as FBI Agent Sanders
- Daniel Bernhardt as Radovan Brokovski
- Kris van Varenberg as Dušan
- Mila Kalađurđević as Almira
- Paul Sampson as Klaus
- Kieran Gallagher as Zoran
- Peter Organ as Ivan
- Talia Asseraf as Laura Berns

== Release ==
=== Home media ===
Kill 'Em All was released by Destination Films on Blu-ray, DVD, and Digital HD on June 6, 2017.
