= The Perfect Weapon (2016 film) =

- Directed by: Titus Paar
- Written by: Jessie Cillio; Alex Brenner; Ulysses Oliver
- Produced by: Rafael Primorac; Andre Relis; Brandon Burrows; Courtney Lauren Penn
- Starring: Steven Seagal; Vernon Wells; Richard Tyson; Johnny Messner
- Production companies: VMI Worldwide; Steamroller Productions; Boundless Pictures; ITN Distribution
- Distributed by: Momentum Pictures
- Release date: 2016
- Running time: 88 minutes
- Country: United States
- Language: English
- Budget: $6 million
- Box office: $15,436

The Perfect Weapon is a 2016 American science fiction action film directed by Titus Paar and starring Steven Seagal.

== Plot ==
In the near future, the world has become a totalitarian state under the control of the Director (Steven Seagal). When Condor (Johnny Messner), an elite assassin, fails to terminate his target, he finds himself on the run from the organization that employs him.

Condor is sent on a mission and fails due to his emotional instability and the Director has him go into a sleep state to fix him, but he escapes after learning he is going to be killed either way. It ends where Condor kills the Director, who is actually a robot copy, and the real Director comes out to plan his own attack against Condor as the screen goes dark.

== Cast ==
- Steven Seagal as The Director
- Vernon Wells as The Interrogator
- Sasha Jackson as Nina
- Johnny Messner as Condor
- Richard Tyson as Controller
- Lance E. Nichols as Politician
- Emilien De Falco as Bathroom Thug
- Marshal Hilton as The State Spokesman
- Philip Fornah as Cronus
- Sarah Kate Allsup as Club Goer
- Titus Paar as Sniper
- Sandra Yap as Kyoko

== Production ==
The film was the first released by Firebrand and was financed by the Fyzz Facility and Boundless Pictures. Filming finished in November 2015.

The director said he "really liked the backbone of" the film "the totalitarian state and hitmen in a scif-fi world" but he "really didn’t like the script." He agreed to do the film if he could rewrite the script and claims he rewrote every scene. "Added the old Japanese aspect and wanted it to be a homage to the things I liked as a kid, a homage to the 80-90s action era but at the same time create a complex story with some emotional scenes and character arcs."

He says he "realized a serious film called The Perfect Weapon with Steven Seagal would never work or be taken seriously so it doesn’t take itself too seriously" and says he added the elements of rebellion towards the state and the complex love triangle with the female lead."

Paar cast the film full of homages to the '80s and '90s such as Vernon Wells and Richard Tyson. He says his main influence was Blade Runner.

Dolph Lundgren was going to play the lead role but that fell through and he was replaced by Johnny Messner.
