= The Quest (1996 film) =

1996 film by Jean-Claude Van Damme

- Theatrical release poster
- Directed by: Jean-Claude Van Damme
- Written by: Steven Klein; Paul Mones
- Story by: Frank Dux; Jean-Claude Van Damme
- Produced by: Moshe Diamant
- Starring: Jean-Claude Van Damme; Roger Moore; James Remar; Janet Gunn; Jack McGee; Aki Aleong; Louis Mandylor
- Cinematography: David Gribble
- Edited by: John F. Link; William J. Meshover
- Music by: Randy Edelman
- Distributed by: Universal Pictures (United States, Canada, United Kingdom and Ireland); MDP Worldwide (International)
- Release dates: April 19, 1996 (Turkey); April 26, 1996 (United States)
- Running time: 95 minutes
- Country: United States
- Language: English
- Budget: Debated (see § Production)
- Box office: $57.4 million

The Quest is a 1996 American martial arts adventure film starring and directed by Jean-Claude Van Damme, in his directorial debut. It co-stars Roger Moore, James Remar and Janet Gunn. The plot, set in 1925, follows New York thief Chris Dubois (Van Damme) who is sold into slavery by Lord Edgar Dobbs (Moore) and, after receiving Muay Thai training in Siam, enters an ancestral martial arts tournament in Tibet to win a Golden Dragon.

The Quest premiered in Turkey on April 19, 1996, and was released in the United States on April 26, 1996. It was the last of a five-picture deal between Van Damme and Universal, and the actor continued his career at Columbia. Hyped as Van Damme's be-all end-all martial arts film, it had a complex development and was the subject of several grievances by the star's former friend, Frank Dux. The latter succeeded in obtaining a story credit from the Writers Guild of America, but failed to prove in a court of law that his contributions had been improperly compensated. The film, though it under-performed domestically at the box-office, did better internationally and was a commercial success.

== Plot ==
Late at night, in an empty bar in the present day (the mid-1990s), an old man enters and awaits service. Not long after, a group of thugs arrives and attempts to rob the till. The old man defeats them easily, one by one, with hand-to-hand combat. Amazed, the bartender asks how he learned to fight. The old man replies, "It was long ago..." The story flashes back to Christopher Dubois, a pickpocket in his mid-twenties, living in 1925 New York City. Orphaned as a child, Dubois looks after many young orphans by performing cons and stealing. After stealing a large sum of money from a group of gangsters, Dubois and the children are found by the gangsters. Dubois subdues the gangsters, but the struggle draws the attention of the police.

After promising to return to the children, Dubois escapes the police by stowing away on a boat. He is found out and imprisoned by gun smugglers and pirates and forced into physical labor. Eventually, the crew decides Dubois is no longer needed, but before he can be killed, the pirate ship is attacked and boarded by a mercenary Englishman, Lord Edgar Dobbs. After saving each other's lives, Dobbs agrees to help Dubois return home but deceives him and sells Dubois into slavery on an island off the coast of Siam, where Dubois is trained in Muay Thai fighting.

Six months later, Dobbs and his partner Harry Smythe find Dubois fighting in a Muay Thai match and see that he has become a skilled fighter. Dobbs later assists (and exploits) Dubois, buying his freedom so the now-expert fighter can represent the U.S. in a Kumite-like tournament called the Ghang-gheng, held in the Lost City of Tibet. There, representatives of Germany, Soviet Union, Scotland, Spain, Turkey, Brazil, Korea, Siam, Greece, France, China, Japan, Okinawa, Africa and Mongolia fight in elimination bouts. The tournament winner receives a valuable statue made of solid gold, the Golden Dragon. Along for the journey are American reporter Carrie Newton and heavyweight boxing champion Maxie Devine.

Dubois ultimately wins the tournament by defeating Khan, the representative of Mongolia, and he is given a medal and proclaimed the greatest fighter, but does not accept the Golden Dragon. Instead, he trades it for the lives of Dobbs and his comrade Harry, who were sentenced to death for previously trying to steal the Golden Dragon. In the bar, Dubois explains he returned to New York and helped the children get off the streets. Devine helped to train many great fighters, while Dobbs and Harry opened a trading post deep in the Amazon. In the final scene, a book closes, revealing its title and author: The Quest by Carrie Newton.

== The Ghang-gheng ==
Round of 16
USSR
Spain	W
Germany
United States	W
France
Brazil	W
China	W
Korea
Mongolia	W
Greece
Siam	W
Africa
Japan	W
Okinawa
Turkey	W
Scotland

Quarter-finals
Spain
United States	W
Brazil
China	W
Mongolia	W
Siam
Japan	W
Turkey

Semi-finals
United States	W
China
Mongolia	W
Japan

Final
United States	W
Mongolia

Although Okinawa was annexed by Japan in 1879, it was given a separate spot in the tournament due to its historic role in the development of martial arts.

== Cast ==
- Jean-Claude Van Damme as Chris Dubois
- Roger Moore as Lord Edgar Dobbs
- James Remar as Maxie Devine
- Janet Gunn as Carrie Newton
- Jack McGee as Harry Smythe
- Aki Aleong as Khao Prahan
- Louis Mandylor as Riggi
- Chang Ching Peng Chaplin as Master Tchi
- Ryan Cutrona as Officer O'Keefe
- Abdel Qissi as Khan, Mongolian Fighter
- Jen Sung as Phang Prahan, Siamese Fighter
- Stefanos Miltsakakis as Greek Fighter
- Ong Soo Han as Korean Fighter
- Peter Wong as Chinese Fighter
- Kōji Kitao as Kyoshiro Yama, Japanese Fighter
- César Carneiro as Brazilian Fighter
- Habby Heske as German Fighter
- Peter Malota as Spanish Fighter
- Azdine Nouri as Turkish Fighter
- Brick Bronsky as Russian Fighter
- Winston Ellis as African Fighter
- Takis Triggelis as French Fighter
- Mike Lambert as Scottish Fighter
- Choi-Nam Yip as Okinawan Fighter
- Ze'ev Revach as Turk Captain
- Chai Chapanond as Lama Announcer
- Kristopher Van Varenberg as Young Chris Dubois

== Production ==
Van Damme presented the project as his farewell to the genre that had made him famous via films like Bloodsport and Lionheart, and aimed to mix the secret tournament concept of the former with the cachet of classic adventure movies. On several occasions, the film was referred to as "the Ben-Hur of martial arts films" by an enthusiastic Van Damme, a reference to its Oscar record. Another inspiration was the famous Belgian comic The Adventures of Tintin. A new title also presented the advantage of not having to share a cut of the profits with Bloodsport producer Mark DiSalle.

The film started life at Epic Productions, an outfit co-founded by Double Impact producer Moshe Diamant, where it was most commonly known as Enter the New Dragon and slated to get underway in 1993. After Diamant lost control of Epic in a power struggle with his lenders Crédit Lyonnais, it was phased out in favor of a very similar project at Diamant's follow-up company Signature Films. Introduced at the 1993 Cannes Film Market, the new film was called The Quest. A planned publicity stunt would have seen Van Damme fly above the French city in a Quest-branded hot air balloon, mirroring his exploits in the then-current script, but it had to be called off due to bad weather. Due to the deep connections between Epic and its distribution partner Vision International, the latter was also affected by the Crédit Lyonnais dispute, and Vision president Mark Damon left to launch a new company of his own, MDP Worldwide. The Quest's international distribution rights followed him from Vision to MDP. Universal retained domestic and U.K. rights. The Quest was scheduled to begin filming at the end of 1993 for a Christmas 1994 release, but it was delayed and Sudden Death, another Quintano script that had peaked Van Damme's interest, was made first.

At an early stage, Van Damme expressed interest in hiring Andrei Konchalovsky to direct. Although the announcement was not strictly official, the Belgian acknowledged that he was likely to direct when the project was re-announced at Cannes '93. According to Lettich, he was invited to co-direct the film with Van Damme, but turned it down to quash false assumptions that the Belgian had ghost-directed their previous collaborations, and because he did not want to work with producer Moshe Diamant. The actor eventually took sole directorial credit and chose Peter MacDonald, who had helmed second unit and reshoots on Nowhere to Run, to support him as second unit director. MacDonald also helped storyboard the entire film for Van Damme, and received an executive producer credit. Nowhere to Run cinematographer David Gribble, an Australian like much of the technical crew, was brought back as well. Early on, it was announced that Double Impact's John Jay Moore would return as production designer. The final film was instead designed by Steve Spence, a veteran of many Thailand-based movies, including the Moshe Diamant-backed Men of War.

During its Cannes announcement, The Quest's provisional budget was pegged at $30 million, which remained the most frequently quoted estimate as pre-production was ramping up in late 1994. Numbers as high as $35 or 40 million were sometimes bandied about, as Van Damme claimed that a six-month shoot would be needed to bring his vision to life. However, the star later told Los Angeles Times critic Kevin Thomas that only $12 million had actually gone into the production. There are indications that its biggest setpiece, a large-scale horseback battle planned for the halfway point, was cut at the behest of producer Moshe Diamant.

=== Writing ===
==== Credits ====
According to longtime Van Damme associate Sheldon Lettich, he was offered to co-write, but was busy with other projects and only pitched a few ideas. While by then, there were many doubts about Dux's martial arts credentials, Van Damme and Lettich still found some merit to his narrative ideas. They asked Diamant to hire him and, given his inexperience, paired him with Ed Khmara, who had authored the original draft for Dragon: The Bruce Lee Story. Circa 1992, amidst the transition between Epic and Diamant's new company Signature, Van Damme and the producer severed their relationship with Dux and assigned the project to one of Diamant's regular writers, Gene Quintano. This ultimately led to a lawsuit from Dux.

Late into pre-production in spring 1995, the script was credited to Quintano and Lettich, despite the latter's reportedly limited involvement. The final screenplay was credited to Paul Mones and Steven Klein, the latter a pseudonym for Quintano who opted not to be credited. According to Lettich, Khmara also opted out of his writing credit. Khmara's later resume credited him with a producer role on The Quest, although this does not appear in the finished picture. Such credits are sometimes negotiated by writers who cannot be mentioned in their actual capacity for regulatory or other reasons.

After Dux made his case to the WGA, the organization recommended the unusual credit "Story by Jean-Claude Van Damme and Jean-Claude Van Damme & Frank Dux", which first recognized the star's solo creation of the story of The Quest, then his co-authorship (with Dux) of the story of its precursor, Enter The New Dragon. This was broadly similar to the double screenplay credit received by Jeffrey Boam for Lethal Weapon 3. However, Van Damme asked for one of his two-story credits to be deleted from the finished film "so that it would look more equal".

==== Drafts ====
Although Lettich only had minimal input, he does claim to have come up with the idea of setting the film in the past. This further pushed it into the adventure genre, as the tournament's remote location could not be accessed by modern transportation, and each combatant would have to embark on a journey to get there. In 1991, Van Damme described the film as taking place circa 1930, with China's Shaolin Temples and Forbidden City as marquee locations, and another part set in Tibet. Malaysia was an alternate option thanks to its Buddhist temples. The idea of a mountaintop castle built especially for the shoot was already present. The beefy, 150-page script featured a party of four characters, including a child raised by a Japanese family in China, and a balloonist from France. Early versions went by the name The Big Fight, Enter The New Dragon and The Kumite: Enter the New Dragon. The main character was already named Dubois.

When it was reintroduced as The Quest in 1993, the film was now set in 1860. Paris or Prague would be a major shooting location, although the pirate abduction was present and the remainder of the film would take place in Tibet and China, with the Forbidden City again mentioned as a possible backdrop. The new script was not shown to buyers at that time, and it was still being worked on by Quintano. One source states that the hero's name was temporarily changed to Deleau in that version. By 1994, the general storyline seemed to be in place, with the slavery subplot and the stops in New York, Thailand and China all accounted for. However, it was quoted as taking place in 1902, and Van Damme expressed interest in making his character a boxer from Marseille, bearing some similarities with the premise of 1998's Legionnaire.

=== Casting ===
Roger Moore was pursued aggressively by Van Damme for the role of Lord Dobbs, and did not initially have second thoughts about the Belgian directing the film. He thought it would be a good occasion to spend time in an exotic locale with his girlfriend Christina Tholstrup. In her autobiography, Tatum O'Neal claims that the Belgian courted her for the part of journalist Carrie Newton, assuring her she was his number one choice. The two ended up having a brief romance, but Van Damme later reconsidered his offer and Janet Gunn was hired.

Van Damme had a hand in picking several of the film's fighters. The climactic opponent, a fanciful Mongolian wrestler named Khan, was played by Abdel Qissi, a Moroccan–Belgian with a background in striking. The brother of Michel Qissi, he had already played the final antagonist in Lionheart. Frequent Van Damme associate Peter Malota contributed to the fight choreography and played a Spanish fighter, although he wore an Albanian Eagle on his belt as a tribute to his real-life origins. Stefanos Miltsakakis was another favorite of the star, and appropriately portrayed the Greek contender. French–Algerian Azedine Nouri was also a minor celebrity for his breaking, and was invited to be part of the film after appearing at a Paris-Bercy martial arts festival attended by Van Damme. Sheldon Lettich recommended two of the fighters: César Carneiro, who had appeared in his capoeira-themed Only the Strong, and Takis Trigellis, an acquaintance of his agent. Among other prospects was a young Darren Shahlavi, who turned down the offer after being told by Diamant that he would have to pay his own airfare and housing if he wanted the job.

=== Filming ===
Principal photography took place between early March and mid May 1995 in Thailand. The fictional fort hosting the Ghang-gheng was built in the mountains overlooking the town of Mae Hong Son, near the Burmese border. The film's wraparound scenes were shot in Canada over four days in mid-June 1995, and Montreal stood in for New York City.

As related by Moore in his autobiography, the shoot was poorly organized, and Diamant tried to get the crew to work extra hours without pay to compensate for the delays, many of which, according to actor Jack McGee, were due to Van Damme showing up late on set. Moore and McGee judged that the Belgian was out of his depth as a director, and that second unit director Peter MacDonald carried much of the picture by himself. Moore was aggravated by the decision to build the fort in the mountains, as it was separated from his accommodations by a 1.5 hour drive through rough terrain. He ended up locking a knee during one such trip, and spent much of the shoot in a cast. Moore argued that the fort should have been built in the valley, as it was only seen at night in the film (which is incorrect). Although the Briton remained his jovial self during the shoot, he refused to talk to Diamant again after the release.

Steven Lambert was hired as fight coordinator despite an incident with Van Damme on the set of Timecop, where he was an actor and stunt performer. Van Damme wanted to end the final fight with his signature spin kick, but Lambert suggested that he surprise his fans with a punch combination instead. Although Korean representative Ong Soo Han was a Taekwondo black belt, his style in the film owed more to Tang Soo Do, an early Korean martial arts form that was also less reliant on kicks. Some tensions arose as Van Damme tinkered with the matchups, juggling fighters each looking to maximize their screen time. Azedine Nouri actually broke a table when he was told by Lambert that he would not be featured against Van Damme. Some were also protective of their on-camera persona, such as former sumo wrestler Koji Kitao, who was uncooperative and had to be summarily written out.

== Release ==
The Quest's premiere was held at Universal Studios Hollywood on April 20, 1996. Van Damme, riding an elephant, and Moore, in a rickshaw, paraded throughout the park with some of the film's martial artists, in traditional attire. The fighters then performed a demonstration of their respective disciplines on a Quest-themed stage for the visitors. According to Roger Moore, Van Damme had promised him an above-the-title credit alongside himself when he signed on. But the British veteran discovered during the film's promotion that Van Damme had failed to honor his promise, further exacerbating his disdain for him.

=== Theatrical ===
The Quest opened at number one in the United States, drawing $7,029,120 from 2092 theatres in its first weekend. Although The Truth About Cats & Dogs had a better per-screen average, the performance was viewed positively as it came opposite the beginning of the NBA playoffs. The film benefitted from its PG-13 rating, wider release and less competitive date to improve on the debut of Van Damme's previous effort Sudden Death, which was an R-rated Christmas release. However, its box office quickly subsided and it barely outdrew its predecessor domestically, with a final tally of $21.6 million. The film generated an additional $35.8 million in other territories, for a grand total of $57.4 million (equivalent to $115 million when adjusted for inflation in 2024). The film, though it under-performed domestically at the box-office, did better internationally and was a commercial success.

=== Home media ===
The Quest was released on VHS in the U.S. on September 17, 1996, by MCA/Universal Home Video. It was a durable performer on home video, opening in 11th place and further climbing to 7th place in its third week. The film was certified platinum by the ITA for sales in excess of $18 million or 250,000 copies in November. A LaserDisc version was also released on September 24, 1996.

=== Television ===
The film received its domestic TV premiere on premium channel Starz on March 21, 1997. Its broadcast television debut took place on August 4, 1999, on Fox. It was billed as a "world television premiere" and aired opposite a rerun of Van Damme's previous vehicle Sudden Death on the USA Network.

== Critical response ==
On review aggregator website Rotten Tomatoes, the film has an approval rating of 14% based on 22 reviews and an average rating of 3.7/10. The website's consensus reads: "Jean-Claude Van Damme makes a forgettable directorial debut with The Quest, a bland retread of better heroes' journeys." It received some praise for its production values and old Hollywood atmosphere, but faced criticism for its conventional story and repetitious martial arts sequences. Audiences polled by CinemaScore gave the film an average grade of "B" on an A+ to F scale.

Patrick McGavin of the Chicago Tribune wrote that The Quest "doesn't lack for ambition" but "Van Damme's staging of the fight scenes is less skillful, with a monotony that inevitably flattens the material". He also deemed the film devoid of "a clear, direct narrative path to its improbable though entertaining finish". Janet Maslin of the New York Times was also unimpressed by Van Damme's direction, writing that "[t]he one-on-one bouts have the punch-drunk symmetry of a video game". She summed up the film as "studiously hokey action-adventure [...] recalling many a Charles Bronson vehicle in its crude eagerness to please audiences anywhere on the planet". Emanuel Levy of Variety acknowledged that the film felt "like a personal movie for Van Damme" and that it was "not badly directed or executed", but found it "a self-consciously old-fashioned swashbuckling adventure" and "an insipidly innocuous yarn".

Mick LaSalle of the San Francisco Chronicle gave a middling opinion, finding that "The Quest is at its best in its first half", which reminded him of "a Warner Bros. picture from the early '30s." However, he was disappointed by the tournament part and the representation of the various martial arts, writing that "it may all seem like a lot of guys yelling and kicking each other in the face." Longtime Van Damme supporter Kevin Thomas of the Los Angeles Times was most enthusiastic, calling the film "a socko directorial debut" and "a martial arts adventure odyssey that's epic in scale and high in style." He also found that it provided Roger Moore with "his best part since he retired from playing James Bond".

== Soundtrack ==
The Quest: Original Motion Picture Soundtrack

Film score by Randy Edelman
- Released: April 30, 1996
- Genres: Orchestral; world music
- Length: 40:14
- Label: Varèse Sarabande
- Producer: Randy Edelman

Randy Edelman chronology
Diabolique (1996)	The Quest (1996)	Dragonheart (1996)

The Quest's score was composed, conducted and produced by Randy Edelman. It was released on CD by film music label Varèse Sarabande on April 30, 1996. Edelman was in the midst of a successful run with Universal at the time, which included Dragon: The Bruce Lee Story. His work on The Quest, and its nods to traditional East Asian music, have been compared to the former. Music from Dragon was also used for The Quest's trailer.

== Litigation ==
=== Pre-trial ===
While The Quest was publicized as a different work than Enter the New Dragon, Frank Dux considered that the finished film was a thinly disguised rework of the screenplay he had co-written for the latter. Unbeknownst to Van Damme, he presented his early script to the Writers' Guild of America for recognition of his contributions. The union granted him a story credit, which can be seen in the film. Dux then filed a lawsuit against Van Damme in the Los Angeles County Superior Court, alleging that he had been improperly compensated for his efforts. The initial complaint was thrown out, but an amended version proceeded to a trial by jury, which took place between October 26 and November 5, 1998. Dux sought $900,000 in damages. His lawyer also called for Van Damme to be assessed punitive damages for misrepresenting himself as a top flight martial artist.

=== Plaintiff's arguments ===
Dux's complaint alleged that he had an agreement with Van Damme for his work on Enter the New Dragon, which included a flat fee of $100,000 and 2.5% of the film's gross. Several witnesses accepted Dux's claim that Enter the New Dragon and The Quest were in fact the same film. Others recalled hearing Van Damme use language suggesting that he and Dux were in a financial partnership. According to Dux, Van Damme recommended he sign a contract with a subsidiary of Moshe Diamant's Epic Productions to receive payment for his work on Enter The New Dragon. The Epic agreement was split into two installments of $50,000 (one for writing and one for martial arts consulting), although the second half was not paid due to the company's 1992 bankruptcy. More crucially, Dux's contract with Epic did not establish that he had been promised a percentage of the film's revenue. Dux's explanation was that Van Damme had told him that, for tax reasons, the matter of residuals would be settled separately through an overseas company. Dux testified that he had both a written note and an audio tape of Van Damme's royalty promise, but was unable to retrieve them due to extensive damages sustained by his apartment during the 1994 Northridge earthquake.

=== Defendant's arguments ===
For his part, Van Damme maintained that Enter the New Dragon and The Quest were different films. He denied promising residuals to Dux, and claimed that witnesses suggesting otherwise had been misled by his idiosyncratic English. His lawyer also pointed out that the WGA had not granted Dux his desired screenwriting credit, but a story credit. This meant that only superficial elements from Dux's draft had made it into The Quest, which should not entitle him to gross points. The defense further noted that Dux's lawyer had not mentioned the existence of Van Damme's note and tape in earlier correspondence with the actor's representatives, and neither had Dux himself in his pre-trial deposition. Van Damme's counsels scored a critical blow when they summoned witnesses who contradicted Dux's claims that his residence had been rendered inaccessible by the earthquake. This greatly hurt the plaintiff's credibility in the eyes of the jury, and raised doubts as to whether Van Damme's recorded pledge had ever existed.

=== Verdict ===
Ultimately, the jury found in favor of Van Damme, although some pundits deemed that the presiding judge had not been accommodating to the Dux camp. The judge also ruled that Van Damme could not be held liable for the $50,000 left unpaid after Epic's bankruptcy. Van Damme estimated that he had spent about $250,000 on his defense. Dux filed requests for a new trial, but they were denied in December 1998 and May 1999. Due to his desire to remain neutral in the situation, Lettich saw his relationship with Van Damme damaged for several years. The case formed the basis for "Hollywood Betrayal", an episode of the documentary series Crime Stories hosted by Richard Belzer, which premiered on Court TV on May 28, 1999.
