= Qissi =

Qissi is a surname. Notable people with the surname include:

- Abdel Qissi (born 1960), Moroccan actor and boxer
- Michel Qissi (born 1962), Moroccan actor and filmmaker
