= Running Time =

Running Time may refer to:

- Running Time (film)
- Time complexity
