= Runtime =

Runtime, run-time, or run time may refer to:

- Runtime (program lifecycle phase), the period during which a computer program is executing
- Runtime library, a program library designed to implement functions built into a programming language
- Runtime system, software designed to support the execution of computer programs
- Software execution, the process of performing instructions one by one during the runtime phase

== See also ==
- Running time, the amount of computer time it takes to execute an algorithm
- Running Time (film)
