= Go Away =

Go Away may refer to:

- "Go Away" (2NE1 song), 2011
- "Go Away" (Gloria Estefan song), 1993
- "Go Away" (Lorrie Morgan song), 1997
- "Go Away" (Weezer song), 2015
- "Go Away", a song by Cold from Cold
- "Go Away", a song by Elvis Costello from Momofuku
- "Go Away", a song by Echobelly from On
- "Go Away", a song by Honeycrack from Prozaic
- "Go Away", a song by Living Colour from Stain
- "Go Away", a song by Steve Perry from Street Talk
- "Go Away", a song by Strawberry Switchblade from Strawberry Switchblade
- Go Away (film), an American slasher film
