= Sheldon Lettich =

American screenwriter, film director and producer

- Born: January 24, 1951 (age 75); New York City, New York, U.S.
- Occupations: Director, screenwriter, producer
- Years active: 1982–present

Sheldon Lettich (/ˈlɛtɪtʃ/ LET-itch; born January 14, 1951) is an American screenwriter, film director and producer. He is best known for his collaborations with Jean-Claude Van Damme and his work in the action film genre.

== Early life ==
Born in New York City, Lettich moved to California at a young age and grew up in the Los Angeles area. After graduating from high school, he spent nearly four years in the U.S. Marine Corps, serving as a radio operator in South Vietnam with 3rd Battalion, 1st Marines, and later with the elite 1st Force Reconnaissance Company based at Camp Pendleton, California.

He worked his way through college as a professional photographer and attended the AFI Conservatory's Center for Advanced Film Studies as a Cinematography Fellow. Although his initial career goal was to become a director of photography, at the AFI his interests branched out to encompass writing and directing, which became the two fields where he found eventual success in the entertainment business.

== Writing for the stage ==
Based partly upon his experiences in Vietnam, he co-authored the renowned play Tracers with a group of Vietnam vets who were also aspiring actors. First performed July 4, 1980 at the Odyssey Theater in Los Angeles, the play then traveled to Joseph Papp's Public Theater in New York City, the Steppenwolf Theater in Chicago (directed by Gary Sinise), the Royal Court Theater in London, and numerous venues worldwide. It received both Drama Desk Awards and L.A. Drama Critics Awards, and is still being performed throughout the world.

== Screenplays ==
Around the same time, Lettich was writing numerous spec screenplays. One of these, co-written with Josh Becker, subsequently became the cult classic Thou Shalt Not Kill... Except (also known as Stryker's War), which starred Bruce Campbell, and directed by Becker, both frequent collaborators of Sam Raimi.

Eventually his screenplays began attracting the attention of producers in Hollywood. He co-authored the Cold War drama Russkies, which was the first starring role for a young Joaquin Phoenix. Around the same time he wrote the screenplay for the now-classic martial arts film Bloodsport, which launched the career of Jean-Claude Van Damme. One of his Vietnam-based screenplays caught the eye of Sylvester Stallone, which resulted in an overall deal with Stallone's White Eagle Productions, and led to him co-writing Rambo III with Stallone.

The success of Bloodsport not only turned Jean-Claude Van Damme into an international action star, but it also forged a long and ongoing friendship with the man who wrote it. Van Damme helped to launch Lettich's directing career with the film Lionheart, which became Van Damme's first movie to be released theatrically by a major U.S. studio. This was followed by Double Impact, which was filmed in Hong Kong, with Lettich directing Van Damme in a challenging double role as twin brothers seeking revenge for their parents' murder.

Lettich next discovered Mark Dacascos, who made his starring debut in Only the Strong, a film that introduced the Brazilian martial art of capoeira to international audiences. He also directed Dolph Lundgren in The Last Patrol and Daniel Bernhardt in Perfect Target.

Continuing his long association with Van Damme, Lettich was a writer and a producer on the historical French Foreign Legion film, Legionnaire, which was filmed on location in Morocco. And he directed The Order, an action-thriller starring Van Damme and Charlton Heston, which was filmed on locations in Israel and Bulgaria.

In 2006 he directed and co-wrote The Hard Corps, an urban action-romance. Starring Jean-Claude Van Damme and Vivica Fox, the film was shot on locations around Vancouver, British Columbia, Canada, and on sound stages in Romania, and was financed and released worldwide by Sony Pictures Entertainment.

Lettich stated he has always wanted to make a Vietnam War movie that he wrote, but after seeing Tropic Thunder he felt that no one would take a Vietnam war movie seriously anymore.

== Filmography ==
Year	Title	Director	Writer	Producer	Notes
1983	Firefight	Yes	Yes	No	Short film
1985	Thou Shalt Not Kill... Except	No	Story	No	Also 2nd unit director
1987	Russkies	No	Yes	No	
1988	Bloodsport	No	Yes	No	
1988	Rambo III	No	Yes	No	
1990	Lionheart	Yes	Yes	No	
1991	Double Impact	Yes	Yes	Co-producer	
1993	Only the Strong	Yes	Yes	No	
1997	Perfect Target	Yes	No	No	
1998	Legionnaire	No	Yes	Executive	
2000	The Last Warrior	Yes	No	No	
2001	The Order	Yes	No	No	
2006	The Hard Corps	Yes	Yes	No	
2014	Black Rose	No	No	Executive	
2015	Max	No	Yes	No	

Special thanks

- From Dusk till Dawn (1996)
- Straight Into Darkness (2004)
- Watch This (2016) (Short film)
- Ouija House (2018)

Script polish

- The Quest (1996)
- Second in Command (2006)

Editor

- Cyborg (1989) (Uncredited)

Dedicatee

- Calibre 9 (2011)
