= Josh Becker =

Josh Becker may refer to:

- Josh Becker (filmmaker) (1958–2025), American film and television writer and director
- Josh Becker (politician) (born 1969), American politician
