= The Last Kumite =

2024 Martial arts tournament film

- The Last Kumite
- Directed by: Ross W. Clarkson
- Written by: Sean David Lowe; Ross W. Clarkson
- Produced by: Sean David Lowe; Wayne A. Graves
- Starring: Mathis Landwehr; Kurt McKinney; Billy Blanks
- Cinematography: Ross W. Clarkson
- Edited by: Oliver Harper
- Music by: Paul Hertzog; Stan Bush
- Production companies: Lowe Media & Quest Media; Capelight Pictures
- Distributed by: Capelight Pictures; MPI Media Group (USA)
- Release dates: 9 May 2024 (Germany); 14 May 2024 (United States)
- Running time: 105 minutes
- Countries: Germany; United States
- Language: English

The Last Kumite is a Kickstarter-funded 2024 low-budget martial arts film. It is directed by Ross W. Clarkson with a soundtrack by Paul Hertzog and Stan Bush. It is an homage to popular action movies of the 1980s and 1990s, and largely features a cast of actors from that period, including Matthias Hues, Kurt McKinney, Billy Blanks, Cynthia Rothrock and Michel Qissi.

== Plot ==
Michael Rivers wins a karate tournament and promises his daughter Bree that this is his last. At the afterparty, Rivers is approached by Ron Hall, a former fighter turned fight promoter, who invites him to compete in an underground tournament in Bulgaria with a million-dollar purse: the Kumite. Rivers refuses, but on returning home, he discovers that Hall has had Bree kidnapped to force him to fight.

Rivers is brought to a large house where he encounters the other competitors. Hall welcomes everyone, but after two fighters attempt to intimidate him into returning their loved ones, he has them killed in front of the others as a warning. Hall's undefeated champion Dracko appears and threatens the remaining fighters, who are then given several weeks to train and prepare.

While being shown to his room, Rivers learns about an ex-fighter named Loren who may be able to teach him to beat Dracko. In the past, Loren refused to fight Hall due to Hall's tendency to kill his opponents; in retaliation, Hall broke Loren's leg, murdered his wife in front of him, and took his daughter. Loren agrees to train Rivers, coaching him through sparring matches with various opponents to improve his chances of winning. He also introduces Rivers to Julie Jackson, Dracko's former sensei. She tells Rivers that Dracko was like a son to her until Hall got to him, and she knows he needs to be stopped.

Meanwhile, two of the other fighters, Lea Martin and Damon Spears, bond over having had their loved ones kidnapped as well. Spears attempts to go to the police and speaks to Detective Dobrev, but when she mentions Hall, Dobrev says there’s nothing they can do. Martin and Spears continue to discuss rescue plans. Rivers joins them, while another fighter named Marcus Gantz tries to, but they are suspicious of his motives.

Hall contacts Martin, Spears, and Rivers, and shows them that their loved ones - Martin's sister, Spears' wife, and Rivers' daughter - are alive and imprisoned. He promises to free them if the fighters win, but later tells the captives that their survival is up to him.

When the Kumite begins, Rivers is led to the ring, which is surrounded by a balcony full of wealthy observers wagering on the matches. Dracko kills his opponent, upsetting Gantz; despite this, Gantz, Spears, Martin, and Rivers win their matches. Later, while Rivers is working with Loren, Spears and Martin decide that after elimination, they will find the hostages while everyone else is distracted by the tournament.

In the next round, Dracko defeats Gantz, and although Hall indicates that Dracko should kill him, Rivers intervenes. Martin and Spears are then pitted against each other; Martin wins and refuses to kill Spears. Rivers defeats his opponent, a finalist in the last Kumite, twice as quickly as Dracko did.

Hall announces that the next day will be both the semifinals and the final match, then tells his bodyguards that everything is riding on tomorrow's bet. On his orders, one of them later attacks Rivers, injuring him.

Gantz returns to the police, who appear to reconsider getting involved.

At the semifinals, Dracko defeats Martin, then spares her at Hall's direction. Although favoring his injury, Rivers wins his match and confronts Dracko in the finals. While they fight, Spears and Martin rescue the hostages and bring them to the ring; with his daughter's encouragement, Rivers defeats Dracko and wins the Kumite.

After his victory, the police storm the building and begin making arrests. Gantz reveals that he and his partner - the fighter Dracko killed in the first round - were with the police the whole time, but were unable to act because they needed the bettors to be present so they could be arrested.

Hall attempts to escape, but is stopped by Loren, who defeats him in a fight and considers killing him, but ultimately allows Gantz to arrest him.

Some time later, while Loren is training, his daughter reappears, and they are reunited.

== Production ==
In August 2023, Capelight Pictures released a 4K UHD DVD version of Bloodsport, which included a variety of features. As Bloodsport proved to be still popular, Capelight re-invested some money in a Kickstarter project titled The Last Kumite, "inspired by the likes of Bloodsport, Kickboxer and No Retreat, No Surrender".

== Cast ==
- Mathis Landwehr as Michael Rivers
- Matthias Hues as Ron Hall
- Kurt McKinney as Damon Spears
- Billy Blanks as Loren
- Cynthia Rothrock as Julie Jackson
- Michel Qissi as Wolf
- David Anthony Kurzhal as Marcus Gantz
- Monia Moula as Lea Martin
- Kira Kortenbach as Bree Rivers
- Mike Derudder aka "Mike D. Vecchio" as Dracko
- Abdel Qissi as Detective Dobrev

Bolo Yeung's son David Yeung also appears in the film.

== Soundtrack ==
Paul Hertzog composed the score, with added songs by Stan Bush. Hertzog described their renewed cooperation as "a bit of a nostalgic nod to Bloodsport and Kickboxer".
