= Frank Dux =

Canadian-American martial artist (born 1956)

- Born: Frank William Dux; April 6, 1956 (age 70); Toronto, Canada
- Teacher: Senzo Tanaka (disputed)

Other information
- Occupation: Martial artist, fight choreographer and author
- Website: frankduxbloodsport.com
- Military Career
- Allegiance: United States
- Branch: U.S. Marine Corps Reserve

Frank William Dux ( /ˈduːks/; born April 6, 1956) is a Canadian-American martial artist and fight choreographer. According to Dux, a ninjutsu expert named Senzo Tanaka trained him as a ninja when he was a teenager. He established his own school of ninjutsu called Dux Ryu Ninjutsu, and has said he won a secret martial arts tournament called the Kumite (Note: The term kumite properly refers to an aspect of Japanese karate training, which is distinct from the secret tournament described by Dux.) in 1975. His alleged victory served as the inspiration for the 1988 film Bloodsport starring Jean-Claude Van Damme, but the existence of both Senzo Tanaka and the Kumite he described have been disputed.

Dux served in the United States Marine Corps Reserve from 1975 to 1981, and claims he was sent on covert missions to Southeast Asia and awarded the Medal of Honor. He also asserts he was recruited by Central Intelligence Agency (CIA) director William J. Casey to work as a covert agent. His military records, however, show he was never sent overseas nor received any awards; Dux states the military sabotaged his records to discredit him. He has been accused of falsifying his military service experience by authors Bernard Burkett, Ralph Keyes, and Nigel West, and his claim to have worked for the CIA has been dismissed by Director of Central Intelligence Robert Gates, General Norman Schwarzkopf Jr., Major General John K. Singlaub, and Soldier of Fortune magazine.

Dux worked as a fight choreographer for Bloodsport (1988), Lionheart (1990), and Only the Strong (1993). He detailed his alleged work for the CIA in the book The Secret Man in 1996, and that same year co-wrote the story for the film The Quest alongside Jean-Claude Van Damme. He sued Van Damme for breach of contract over the film, but lost the suit in 1998. He also lost a lawsuit against Soldier of Fortune for libel the following year over their claims he had falsified his military and CIA service.

== Early life ==
Dux was born on April 6, 1956, in Toronto, Canada. His family relocated from Ontario to Los Angeles, California when he was seven, and he later attended Grant High School. Dux states that he was introduced to and trained in ninjutsu by Senzo "Tiger" Tanaka, whom he described as a "world-famous" teacher and the descendant of 40 generations of warriors. Dux says that Tanaka brought him to Masuda, Japan, when he was 16, to train him as a ninja.

== Career ==
Dux served in the United States Marine Corps Reserve from 1975 to 1981, and claimed he was sent on covert missions in Southeast Asia during this time. He also claimed he was awarded the Medal of Honor. Dux wrote articles for the September and October 1980 issues of Black Belt magazine, giving advice on martial arts techniques including knife fighting. He was described as being "decorated for his blade fighting techniques in actual combat in Southeast Asia" and as holding black belts in "Taekwondo and other arts". He also co-authored an article on knife fighting for Inside Kung Fu magazine in 1987.

In 1980, Dux was interviewed by John Stewart from Black Belt, stating that he participated in a 1975 martial arts competition in The Bahamas called the Kumite, describing the event as a 60-round single-elimination tournament held in secret every five years. According to Dux, he was the first person to be given permission to speak publicly about the event, and was the first Westerner to win the tournament, achieving several world records there including the most consecutive knock-outs (56) and the fastest knockout punch (0.12 seconds). The 1988 film Bloodsport is based on his alleged Kumite victory. At the time of the film's release, he was operating martial arts schools in Woodland Hills and North Hollywood, Los Angeles, teaching his own martial art style, Dux Ryu ninjutsu, which is based on the Koga Ninja root principles of Ko-ryū, "adaptability and consistent change". Dux worked as the fight coordinator for Bloodsport and also for the 1990 film Lionheart and the 1993 film Only the Strong.

In 1993, Dux attended the 2nd annual Draka Martial Arts Trade Show in Los Angeles, where he had a confrontation with kickboxer Zane Frazier. Dux had previously hired Frazier to teach classes for him, though Frazier alleges that Dux never paid him. A fight ensued, with Frazier proving victorious. Rorion Gracie and Art Davie witnessed the fight and subsequently offered Frazier a position in the Ultimate Fighting Championship. Dux states that Frazier sucker punched him while wearing brass knuckles, in contradiction to multiple sources, including mixed martial arts (MMA) referee John McCarthy, who make no mention of this in their accounts of the fight.

Dux released the book The Secret Man: An American Warrior's Uncensored Story in 1996. In the book, Dux states that Central Intelligence Agency (CIA) director William J. Casey arranged to meet him in a restroom, and recruited him to work on covert missions, including destroying a fuel depot in Nicaragua and a chemical weapons plant in Iraq.

Alongside Jean-Claude Van Damme, Dux was a co-author of the 1996 film The Quest. Dux sued Van Damme after the film's release for breach of contract, on the grounds the finished film was too similar to the manuscript Enter the New Dragon, which the two had also written. In 1998, Dux lost the case, with the jury foreman stating jurors found Dux's testimony "less than credible", including his assertion that audiotapes of his agreement with Van Damme were destroyed in the 1994 Northridge earthquake. Dux appealed the verdict, and the appeal was dismissed in 1999.

== Disputed claims ==
=== Military service and Medal of Honor ===
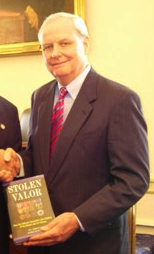
B.G. Burkett pictured with Stolen Valor, which states Dux fabricated his military service

Contrary to his claims, Dux's military records obtained through the Freedom of Information Act show that he never served overseas, that he has not been given the Medal of Honor or any other award, and that in January 1978 he was referred for psychiatric evaluation after he expressed "flighty and disconnected ideas". Dux states that the military sabotaged his service record to discredit him. A photograph of Dux in military uniform shows service ribbons being displayed in an incorrect order, and the Medal of Honor he is wearing is the version given to members of the United States Army, rather than the Marine Corps. Questioned about the photograph in 1988, Dux told John Johnson from the Los Angeles Times he was not able to get the military to explain why he was awarded a medal from the wrong service, though in later years he changed his story to say the uniform was just a Halloween costume.

In his book Stolen Valor, which won the Colby Award in 2000, B.G. Burkett says that Dux fabricated his military history and awards, and had not served in Vietnam, noting the war had ended before he enlisted. Dux responded to the allegations by saying he never claimed to have served in Vietnam, only in covert missions in Southeast Asia, though, in 1980, he was described in Black Belt as having "a distinguished military record during the Vietnam conflict", and an interview with him in a 1987 issue of Inside Kung Fu describes him as a Vietnam veteran. Authors Ralph Keyes and Nigel West have also disputed Dux's military service, as has Soldier of Fortune magazine. In 2012, Sheldon Lettich, co-writer of Bloodsport, said that Dux originally showed him a Medal of Honor he claimed to have been awarded, though years later, after people began questioning if he had "won" the medal, Dux then tried to convince him he had never made such a claim.

=== Kumite ===
When interviewed by John Johnson in 1988, John Stewart expressed regret for writing the Black Belt article on Dux's alleged Kumite victory. He described himself as naive for believing Dux, saying that after the story was published he received information that "raised questions about Dux's military career". Jim Coleman, then editor of Black Belt, added that Dux's story was "based on false premises" and there was no evidence of the Kumite. Kenneth Wilson of the Ministry of Sports in The Bahamas disputed the existence of the Kumite, saying it was impossible a martial arts tournament of that scale could have been kept a secret. According to Johnson, an invoice for the organization that allegedly staged the Kumite listed Dux as its only point of contact, and the base of the trophy he claims to have won was bought by him at a local trophy store. Dux told Johnson to speak to a man named Richard Robinson, whom he said he had met at the Kumite. Robinson initially confirmed Dux's story, saying that he himself had been invited to the Kumite as he was an undefeated wrestler at Lower Merion High School. Johnson later uncovered that Robinson had not attended that school, and had actually gone to school with Dux. Confronted with this information, Robinson responded "All right. I don't know what to say ... Frank was a buddy of mine when I was in L.A."

Sheldon Lettich said that he got the idea for Bloodsport after listening to Dux's "tall tales" regarding the Kumite. Dux introduced him to a man named Richard Bender who claimed to have been at the Kumite and verified the story, though a few years later confessed to Lettich that he had been lying and that Dux had instructed him on what to say. Lettich described Dux as a "delusional day-dreamer". Citing his Kumite claims, MMA website Fightland includes Dux among their list of martial arts frauds. Both John Johnson and Fightland believe Dux faked his story to help promote his martial arts schools.

=== Senzo "Tiger" Tanaka ===
John Johnson reported he could find no evidence of Dux's alleged teacher Senzo "Tiger" Tanaka in history books or from other martial arts experts. Dux told Johnson he did not know the whereabouts of Tanaka or even if he was still alive, though in later years changed his story to say it was Tanaka's dying wish for him to compete in the Kumite. When Johnson pointed out that Dux's teacher has the same name as a ninja commander from Ian Fleming's James Bond novel You Only Live Twice, Dux responded by saying that Fleming "used to base his characters on real people". In March 2017, Dux wrote an article saying he had found Tanaka's death certificate, which showed he had died in Los Angeles in 1975, though as of 2016 Dux's website said that Tanaka died in Japan.

=== Fight record ===
In 1980, Dux told Black Belt that his fight record so far was 321 wins, one loss and seven draws, though in 2014 he told AXS TV that he had retired with a fight record of 329 wins, zero losses. Curtis Wong, an editor of Inside Kung Fu, doubted whether Dux's alleged 56 consecutive knockout record was possible. Dux described the Kumite to Black Belt magazine as a 60 round single-elimination tournament where losers had to leave. In order for a single-elimination tournament to have 60 rounds, there would need to have been more competitors in the Kumite than there are people on the entire planet. Dux responded to critics arguing the math regarding participants of the Kumite was impossible by posting an article on his website that describes a version of the Kumite that contradicts the version he originally described to Black Belt, where losers of matches continued fighting each other. Others observe the difficulty in proving or disproving Dux's "impossibly impressive" records, as he is the only person able to verify his claims.

=== CIA work and The Secret Man ===
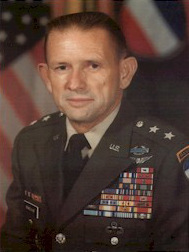
John K. Singlaub said the claims in Dux's memoir were an insult to the reader's intelligence.

Dux claims in his book The Secret Man to have worked for the CIA, but several notable figures have publicly contradicted his account. Robert Gates, William J. Casey's deputy and successor, said he had never heard of Dux, nor had anyone else he knew in the CIA. Dux named General Norman Schwarzkopf Jr. and Major-General John K. Singlaub as other people he had worked for, both of whom denied Dux's assertions. Singlaub called the book "virtually a complete fabrication", and had his lawyer write to HarperCollins (of which Dux's publisher ReganBooks was an imprint) asking for it to be recalled. Soldier of Fortune identified at least ten logical inconsistencies in the book, such as Dux's "preposterous" claim that Casey personally handled his operations and ensured that no one else in the CIA would know of his existence, which Dux contradicts when he describes receiving documents and support from other personnel on numerous occasions. A CIA spokesman said the book was "sheer fantasy", adding that it was unusual for the CIA to comment on such matters, but Dux's claims were "so preposterous that we thought it was necessary". The same spokesman said it was convenient for Dux that Casey was dead and unable to refute the book himself. Reviewing the book, Publishers Weekly said, "It's hard to tell whether the author is merely posturing or expressing his fantasy life in a memoir that reads as if patterned on the early paperback Avenger series."

Dux also alleged in the book that his father Alfred had worked for Mossad before the Second World War and also joined the Jewish Brigade in 1939. Nigel West says that Dux's description of family history does not "withstand much scrutiny", noting that Mossad was not formed until after the Second World War and that the Jewish Brigade was not formed until several years after Alfred is said to have joined it. Lieutenant Commander Larry Simmons, a novelist who formerly commanded SEAL Team 5 and who had the same literary agent as Dux, posed with Dux for a photograph. Dux featured the photo in the book, with the caption saying he was "talking shop" with the SEAL Team leader. Simmons denied "talking shop" with him, adding that Dux was "not an American warrior. He is a con man".

=== Other claims and reactions ===
Writing in the book Action Speaks Louder, Eric Lichtenfield said that when Dux's claimed exploits are questioned, he counters by "actually exploiting his lack of substantiating evidence, and spinning it" into even wilder stories. Dux says that the reason he no longer has a sword he was presented with at the Kumite is that he sold it in a failed attempt to buy the freedom of a boat of orphans whom he later rescued from pirates, that he stopped a plot to assassinate Steven Seagal, and that discrepancies in his martial arts history are the work of fabrications by his rivals including ninjutsu master Stephen K. Hayes.

While many sources dismiss Dux's claims entirely, others believe there may be some truth to his stories. Dux sued Soldier of Fortune publisher Robert K. Brown for libel following the publication of their articles about him. Though Dux eventually lost the case, he was not proven wrong on every detail. During the hearing, John Johnson presented a photocopy of a receipt that he said proved that Dux had purchased his Kumite trophy rather than winning it, though the judge refused to admit it as evidence, noting discrepancies, such as the date on the photograph of Dux holding the trophy being earlier than the date on the receipt. Dariel Figueroa from Uproxx opined that there were several holes in Dux's claims, but also holes in the claims of some of his critics, "leading to a mess of false evidence, lies, and, somewhere in the middle, the truth". Hugh Landman from Ranker has stated that while Dux "lies about, or at least greatly exaggerates, many aspects of his career", that does not necessarily mean his story is entirely false; Landman speculates that Dux may have won a Kumite that was significantly different from the one that appears in Bloodsport.

== Film credits ==
Dux's credits on martial arts films are as follows:

- 1988 Bloodsport (fight choreographer)
- 1990 Lionheart (fight choreographer)
- 1993 Only the Strong (fight choreographer)
- 1996 The Quest (story co-writer)
