= Harpies (film) =

Fantasy film with Harpies

- Written by: Declan O'Brien
- Directed by: Josh Becker
- Starring: Stephen Baldwin; Velizar Binev; Peter Jason; Kristin Richardson; Atanas Srebrev; Stephen Orosz; Christian Hammerdorfer; Jonas Talkington
- Country of origin: United States
- Original language: English

Production
- Producers: Stan Lee; Jeff Franklin

Original release
- Network: Sci Fi Channel
- Release: June 23, 2007

Harpies (or Stan Lee's Harpies) is a Sci Fi Pictures original film directed by Josh Becker. Stan Lee is the executive producer. The film began pre-production under the working title The Harpy on June 26, 2006 and first aired on June 23, 2007. The movie was shot in Bulgaria.

== Plot ==
Jason is a former policeman turned museum security guard who is accidentally transported back in time via an amulet. He wins the trust of Celestia and her father after he rescues him from a harpy attack, in the process reminding the village priest of the legend of a prodigal figure referenced in ancient scrolls. Jason is initially dismissive of the villagers' pleas to help them fight the evil wizard Vorian and end his control over the king Castor, as he would rather return home. He tries soliciting help from Vorian, only for this to result in the wizard trying to kill him via the harpies he controls. Jason manages to break free with help from the village warriors.

Jason instructs the villagers on how to create a trebuchet, which they successfully use to invade the castle. While the battle ends with the villagers gaining control over the castle, many die and Celestina is captured by Vorian and taken to his mountain hideout. Vorian issues a threat to Jason: he will kill Celestina unless Jason brings him the amulet, which matches one that Vorian also possesses.

The warriors and Jason invade the mountain, during which time Jason discovers that Vorian has thousands of harpy eggs. He and the others manage to use the trebuchet to seal up the mountain and Jason destroys the eggs by dousing them with gasoline and setting them on fire. In the ensuing chaos Jason, Vorian, Celestia, and the Queen Harpy are transported to the present day. Jason is able to send Vorian and the harpy back in time, leaving him and Celestia in the present. The film ends with the two exiting the museum as a fellow security guard discovers all of the destruction caused by the final battle.

== Release ==
Harpies premiered on the Sci-Fi Channel on June 23, 2007. It was later given a DVD release in 2012.

== Reception ==
Dread Central panned the film, writing "How pitiful does it get? So pitiful that I began feeling bad for pretty much everyone involved with this film’s creation. Poor quality CGI, impoverished production values, uniformly bad acting, and a clichéd script: all the stuff you expect from a Sci-Fi Channel original but this time with an extra added layer of embarrassment." The Christian Science Monitor gave the movie a C+, stating that "If campy science fiction is your thing, then this is the summer delight for you."
