= Lunatics: A Love Story =

1991 American comedy film

- VHS Artwork
- Directed by: Josh Becker
- Written by: Josh Becker
- Produced by: Sam Raimi; Bruce Campbell; Robert Tapert
- Starring: Ted Raimi; Deborah Foreman; Bruce Campbell; George Aguilar; Brian McCree
- Cinematography: Jeffrey Dougherty
- Edited by: Kaye Davis
- Music by: Joseph LoDuca
- Distributed by: Renaissance Pictures; SVS/Triumph Home Video
- Release date: February 1991
- Running time: 87 minutes
- Country: United States
- Language: English
- Budget: <$500,000

Lunatics: A Love Story is a 1991 comedy romance film with neo-noir (especially psycho-noir) connections written and directed by Josh Becker, starring Ted Raimi, Deborah Foreman and Bruce Campbell. The film tells the story of a young, paranoid aspiring poet who, after an accidental phone conversation with a seemingly sweet woman, is forced to overcome his worries in order to win her heart. The film's music was composed by Joseph LoDuca, and was edited by Kaye Davis.

== Plot ==
In a rough area in Los Angeles, an aspiring poet has spent six months without leaving his apartment because of his obsessive delusions concerning cruel doctors, rappers, and spiders. Meanwhile, a woman who appears to curse things by wanting to help is dumped by her boyfriend and finds herself flat broke on the streets of LA. Soon she runs into a local gang. Due to a telephone glitch, our hero calls her at a phone booth trying to dial a "talk line" and invites her to his place. There they are forced to aid each other in overcoming their particular problems.

== Cast ==
- Deborah Foreman as Nancy
- Ted Raimi as Hank
- Bruce Campbell as Ray
- George Aguilar as Comet
- Brian McCree as Presto

== See also ==
- List of American films of 1991
