= The Secret Man (book) =

1996 book by Frank Dux

- Author: Frank Dux
- Language: English
- Publisher: ReganBooks
- Publication date: 1996
- Publication place: United States
- Media type: Print
- Pages: 316
- ISBN: 978-0060391522

The Secret Man: An American Warrior's Uncensored Story is a memoir by martial artist Frank Dux, published in 1996 by ReganBooks. In the book, Dux asserts he was recruited by Central Intelligence Agency (CIA) director William J. Casey in a public toilet to work on covert missions, including destroying a fuel depot in Nicaragua and a chemical weapons plant in Iraq. Dux's claims in the book have been contested by several notable figures, including CIA director Robert Gates, General Norman Schwarzkopf Jr., Major General John K. Singlaub, as well as Soldier of Fortune magazine.

== Content ==
The book begins with a foreword by Lieutenant Commander (LCDR) Larry Simmons, a novelist who formerly commanded SEAL Team 5. Dux details his family history, describing himself as a third generation espionage agent, saying his grandfather wounded Field marshal William Birdwood and shot major general William Bridges during the First World War, and his father Alfred worked for Mossad before the Second World War and joined the Jewish Brigade in 1939.

Dux states Central Intelligence Agency (CIA) director William J. Casey met him at a urinal, introducing himself as "head of the fucking CIA" and recruiting him as a covert operative. Dux states Casey was his personal handler and no one else in the CIA knew he was working for the agency. Dux gives details of several missions he allegedly performed for the CIA between 1981 and 1987, including destroying a fuel depot in Nicaragua, being part of a joint CIA-KGB operation known as Delphi 9 which investigated the Sverdlovsk anthrax leak, and being the sole survivor of a five man high-altitude military parachuting team's failed attempt to destroy an Iraqi chemical weapons plant during the Iran–Iraq War.

Dux describes Major General John K. Singlaub as the leader of the Phoenix Program, and states he worked with an "Admiral Smith" to deliver intelligence reports to General Norman Schwarzkopf Jr. in preparation for his plan to disguise US helicopters as Iraqi during the Gulf War.

== Reaction ==
Reviewing the book, Publishers Weekly said "It's hard to tell whether the author is merely posturing or expressing his fantasy life in a memoir that reads as if patterned on the early paperback Avenger series." In an article about the book's disputed claims, The Plain Dealer said that Dux was either "James Bond, Rambo and the Karate Kid all rolled into one, or a fiction writer being peddled as a true American hero.

Several notable figures refuted Dux's claims to have worked for the CIA. Robert Gates, William J. Casey's deputy and successor, said he had never heard of Dux, nor had anyone else he knew in the intelligence community. General Norman Schwarzkopf Jr. and Major General John K. Singlaub both denied Dux's assertions. Schwarzkopf Jr. said there was never any plan to disguise US helicopters during the Gulf War, and further added that he had never heard of the "Admiral Smith" that Dux refers to, while Singlaub was actually the leader of the Studies and Observations Group, and was never involved in the Phoenix Program. In the book, Dux says he last saw Singlaub at a military convention in San Diego in 1993. Singlaub said he never attended the convention, and that he had never met Dux. He called the book "virtually a complete fabrication" that was "an insult" to the reader's intelligence. He had his lawyer write to HarperCollins, the company that owned the imprint ReganBooks which published the book, asking for it to be recalled. CIA spokesman Mark Mansfield said the book was "sheer fantasy", adding that it was unusual for the CIA to comment on such matters though Dux's claims were "so preposterous that we thought it was necessary", also stating that it was convenient for Dux that Casey was dead and unable to refute the book himself. ReganBooks refused to speak to The Plain Dealer about the allegations, and Dux did not return their calls. Dux's website features a letter from a Lieutenant commander named Alexander Martin who professes that Dux was a covert operative, though the existence of Martin is disputed.

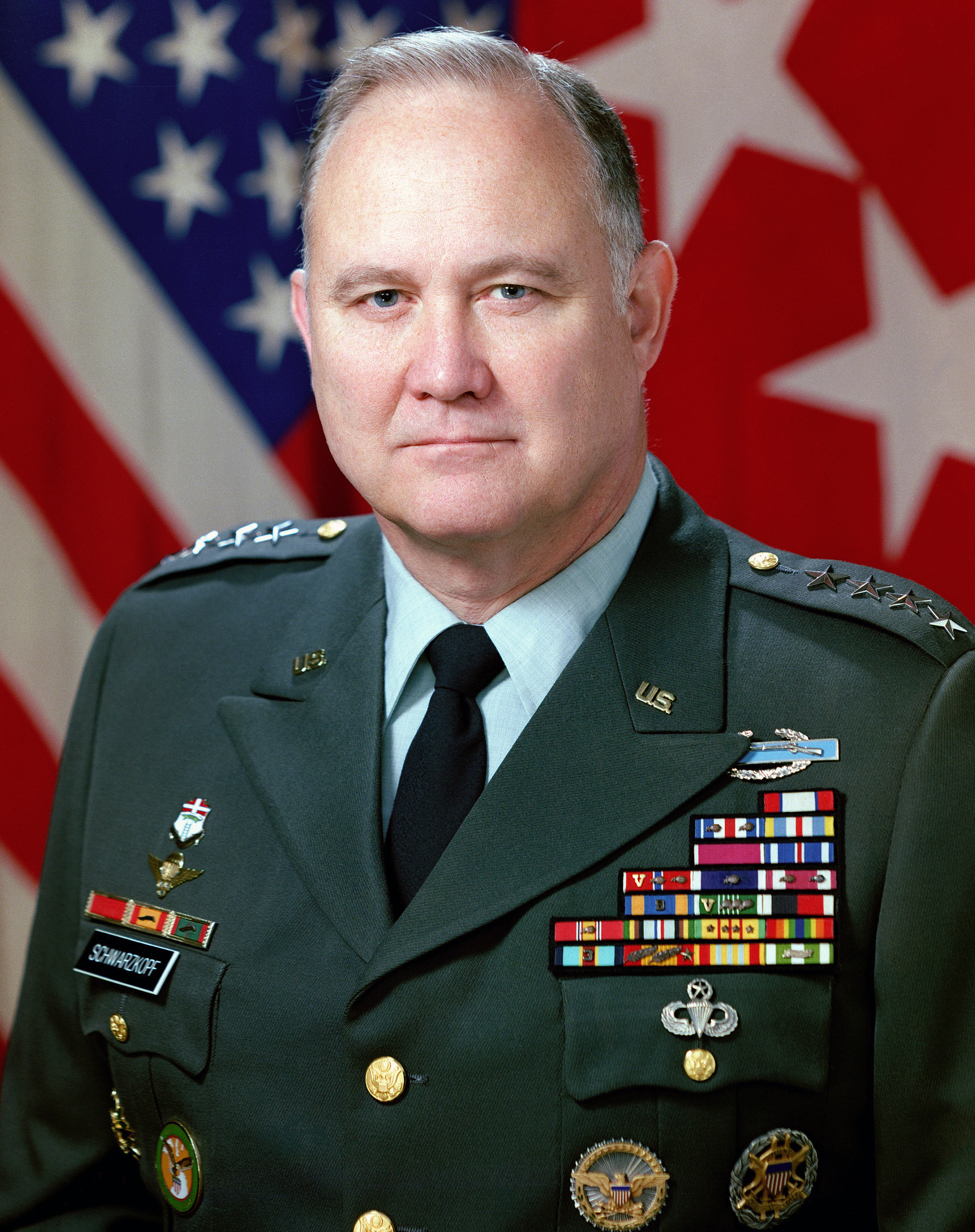
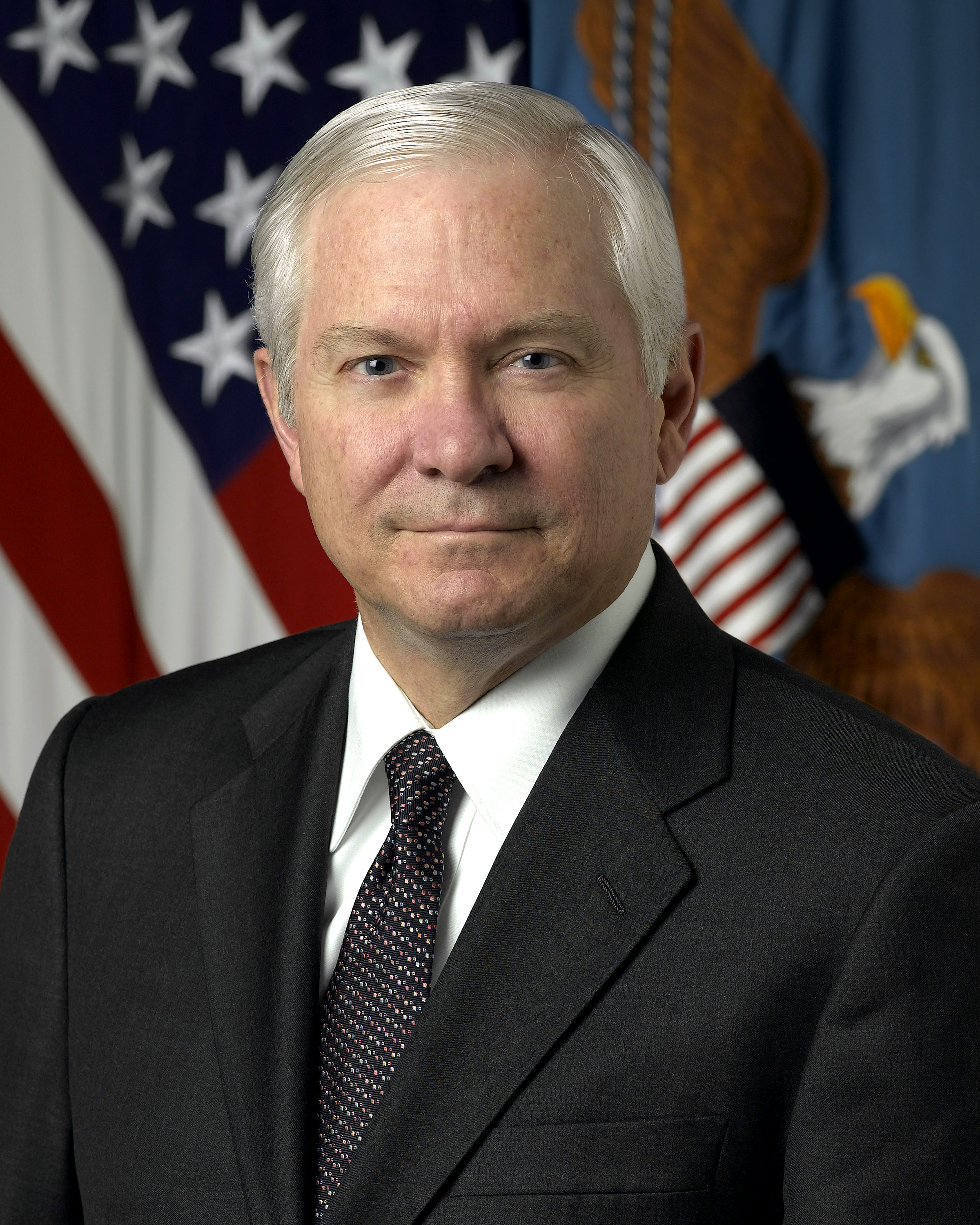
General Norman Schwarzkopf Jr. (left) refuted Dux's claims, and CIA director Robert Gates said nobody he knew in the intelligence community had heard of Dux.

Author Rupert Allason says that Dux's claims about his family history do not "withstand much scrutiny", noting that his father Alfred could not have joined Mossad before the Second World War as the agency was not formed until after the war ended, and that the Jewish Brigade was not formed until several years after Alfred is said to have joined it. LCDR Simmons said that after reading a few pages of the book he knew he had "been deceived into lending credibility to a fraudulent endeavor". Simmons, who had the same literary agent as Dux, was asked by his agent to write a "generic" foreword for the book. Simmons posed with Dux for a photograph, which Dux featured in the book, with the caption saying he was "talking shop" with the SEAL Team leader. Simmons denied "talking shop" with him, adding that Dux was "not an American warrior. He is a con man."

In a review titled "Full Mental Jacket", Alexander McColl from Soldier of Fortune magazine described the book as a "literary laxative". He opined it contained many plot holes, and provided ten examples in his review, such as Dux's "preposterous" claim that Casey ensured no one else in the CIA would know of his existence, yet contradicts himself by describing receiving documents and support from other personnel on numerous occasions. In addition, he criticized some of the photographs in the book, including one that shows Dux in a military uniform with what appears to be an M16 rifle, with the caption saying it was taken in 1983 in a trench. According to McColl, while the rifle is styled to look like an M16 it is actually an Italian-made .22 Long Rifle, a low-powered firearm designed for varmint hunting. McColl sarcastically questioned why the CIA would have provided Dux with a "squirrel rifle". Dux refused to give any additional details about his missions for the CIA to McColl, on the grounds he and his family would face retribution if he did. McColl describes this "lame evasion" as ironic, noting that Dux wrote an entire book purporting to expose CIA secrets yet will not give the dates and locations of some events that would help verify his stories. Dux sued Soldier of Fortune for libel following their criticism of The Secret Man, though the court ruled in the magazine's favor.
