= Perfect Target =

- Directed by: Sheldon Lettich
- Written by: Peter Brosnan; Michael Lanahan; George Saunders
- Produced by: Chris Bialek; Sheri Elowsky; Christian Halsey Solomon; George Hernandez; Jose Ludlow; Mark Maine; Rebecca Morrison; Alexander Tabrizi
- Starring: Daniel Bernhardt; Jim Pirri; Dara Tomanovich
- Cinematography: Chuy Chávez
- Edited by: Donn Aron
- Music by: David Michael Frank
- Production companies: Alexander Tabrizi Productions; Quadra Entertainment
- Distributed by: Ascot Video; Imperial Entertainment; Quadra Entertainment
- Release date: September 17, 1999 (USA)
- Running time: 89 minutes
- Countries: Mexico; United States
- Language: English

Perfect Target is a 1997 Mexican-American action/thriller film directed by Sheldon Lettich and starring Daniel Bernhardt.

== Plot ==
A former soldier finds mercenary work as security for the president of a foreign country and becomes the fall guy for an assassination plot. He escapes and joins the rebels to clear his name and expose the true person behind the president's assassination.

== Cast ==
- Daniel Bernhardt as David Benson
- Jim Pirri as Miguel Ramirez
- Dara Tomanovich as Teresa Ramirez
- Robert Englund as Colonel Shakwell
- Brian Thompson as Major Oxnard
- Julieta Rosen as Isabela Santiago Casillas
- Mario Iván Martínez as President Casillas
- Bob Koherr as Mason
- Terrence Stone as Stiles
- Oscar Dillon as Washington
- Ramiro González as Peoples
- Jimmi Hefner as Pablo
- Pedro Castillo as Joselito
- Guy De Saint Cyr as General Baez
- René Gatica as Vice President Azusa

== Production ==
Filming took place in Jalisco, Nayarit, and Puerto Vallarta, Mexico.

== Release ==
The film was released direct-to-video in Germany on April 28, 1997. It was not released in the US, until September 11, 1999.
