= The Last Warrior (2000 film) =

- Official DVD cover
- Directed by: Sheldon Lettich
- Written by: Stephen Brackley; Pamela K. Long
- Produced by: Hanan Kotzky; Jacob Kotzky
- Starring: Dolph Lundgren; Sherri Alexander; Joe Michael Burke; Rebecca Cross; Brook Susan Parker
- Cinematography: David Gurfinkel
- Edited by: Martha Huntley; Isaac Sehayek
- Music by: David Michael Frank
- Distributed by: Artisan Entertainment
- Release dates: April 6, 2000 (Brazil); August 21, 2001 (United States)
- Running time: 95 minutes
- Country: United States
- Language: English
- Budget: $3 million

The Last Warrior (also known as The Last Patrol) is a 2000 American action film directed by Sheldon Lettich, and starring Dolph Lundgren, Sherri Alexander, Joe Michael Burke, Rebecca Cross and Brook Susan Parker. The film was released on direct-to-video in the United States on August 21, 2001.

== Plot ==
An earthquake measuring 9.5 on the Richter Scale splits California into an island with a perpetual dustcloud hanging over it. The survivors of the terrible ordeal have started to come together in the shape of Nick Preston (Dolph Lundgren) an air force captain, and other fractions of the military, including Sarah McBride (Sherri Alexander) and Lucky Simcoe (Joe Michael Burke), and have situated themselves in a warfare junkyard, holding weaponry from forgotten conflicts. They are searching for food, fuel and fellow survivors, and a possible path into the next world, while also dodging a violent plague that causes the skin to boil.

== Cast ==
- Dolph Lundgren as Captain Nick Preston
- Sherri Alexander as Captain Sarah McBride
- Joe Michael Burke as Sergeant Lucky Simcoe
- Rebecca Cross as Candy Simcoe
- Brook Susan Parker as Rainbow Jones
- Juliano Mer as Jesus Carrera
- Chanan Elias as Simon Peace
- Ze'ev Revach as "Cooky"
- Angelique Lettich as Tamara
- Terry Big Charles as Pope
- Howard Rypp as Will
- Gilya Stern as Miriam
- Ishai Golan as Richard Jasper
- Jack Adalist as Ferguson McGee
- Nati Ravitz as State Trooper

== Production ==
=== Filming ===
It was filmed in Eilat, Israel over the course of 42 days from May 18 to June 29, 1999.

== Release ==
=== Home media ===
On November 27, 2000, a Region 2 DVD was released in the United Kingdom by Planet.

On August 21, 2001, a Region 1 DVD was released in the United States by Lionsgate.

On July 13, 2009, a Region 2 DVD was released in the United Kingdom by Anchor Bay Entertainment.
