= Thou Shalt Not Kill... Except =

- DVD release cover
- Directed by: Josh Becker
- Screenplay by: Josh Becker; Scott Spiegel
- Story by: Josh Becker; Sheldon Lettich; Bruce Campbell; Sam Raimi
- Produced by: Scott Spiegel
- Starring: Robert Rickman; John Manfredi; Timothy Patrick Quill; Sam Raimi; Ted Raimi
- Cinematography: Josh Becker
- Edited by: Josh Becker
- Music by: Joseph LoDuca
- Production companies: Action Pictures; Renaissance Pictures
- Distributed by: Film World Distributors (US)
- Release dates: October 13, 1985 (Warren, Michigan); May 21, 1987 (West Germany, Japan)
- Running time: 84 minutes
- Country: United States
- Language: English
- Budget: $200,000

Thou Shalt Not Kill... Except, also known as Stryker's War, is a 1985 American action horror film directed by Josh Becker and starring Robert Rickman, John Manfredi, Tim Quill, Cheryl Hausen, Perry Mallette and Sam Raimi. It was written by Becker and Scott Spiegel from a story by Becker, actor Bruce Campbell, and Sheldon Lettich.

The film held its premiere in Warren, Michigan on October 13, 1985, and was later released to video in West Germany and Japan on 21 May 1987, followed by Canada on March 31, 1999.

== Plot ==
Having come home after half of his squadron was killed during the Vietnam War, Sergeant Jack Stryker (portrayed by Brian Schulz), given an honorable discharge due to his injuries, attempts to get his life back together. Finding himself reunited with an old girlfriend, Sally (Cheryl Hausen) and his war buddies, he feels he may have successfully re-established his life. However, this happiness is quickly cut short when a murderous cult led by an enigmatic but unnamed Charles Manson-like figure (portrayed by director and writer Sam Raimi) comes into town to continue their rampage.

After Sally is tortured and Stryker and his compatriots find the cult torturing police officers near his house, they arm themselves up and decide to - as the trailer puts it - "break the laws of both God (the title is a reference to one of the Biblical Ten Commandments) and man" and fight back. What follows is a war between the two groups, ending in numerous deaths, including the cult leader's; the exchange between the cult leader and Stryker is as follows:

Cult leader: "I am Jesus Christ!" Stryker: "No, you're not — you're dead."

Upon which Stryker shoots the cult leader in the chest, and he careens into a river, eventually being impaled on a motorcycle, and their brutal war is ended.

== Cast ==
=== Stryker's group ===
- Brian Schulz as Sergeant Jack Stryker
- Robert Rickman as Sgt. Walker J. Jackson
- John Manfredi as 2nd Lt. David Miller
- Tim Quill as Lt. Cpt. Tim Tyler
- Cheryl Hausen as Sally
- Perry Mallette as Otis
- Pam Lewis as Mom
- Jim Griffen as Dad

=== Cult members ===
- Sam Raimi as Cult Leader
- Connie Craig as Bald Cult Girl
- Ivitch Fraser as Young Cult Girl
- Terry-Lynn Brumfield as Sleazy Cult Girl
- Ted Raimi as Chain Man
- Kirk Haas as the Stabber
- Al Johnston as Big Biker
- Chuck Morris as Puke Biker
- Scott Mitchell as Mad Hatter
- Scott Spiegel as Pincushion
- Glenn Barr as Archer
- Marek Pacholec as Bat Man

=== Others/uncredited ===
- David Kelly
- Gary Jones
- Josh Becker as hood crushed under the car/shot cult leader (uncredited)
- Bruce Campbell as video newscaster (uncredited)
- Don Campbell as Marine (uncredited)

== Production ==
Thou Shalt Not Kill... Except was originally produced in 1980 as a Super-8 film entitled Stryker's War, designed to get interest from investors; Campbell and Becker drafted the story ideas while returning home from the Tennessee set of The Evil Dead. The interior sets were primarily Bruce Campbell's garage in suburban Detroit, Michigan, dressed up as either a military base or Stryker's house. The Vietnam scenes were filmed in Hartland, though the overhead shots consist solely of stock footage.

== Release ==
Thou Shalt Not Kill... Except was given a limited release theatrically in the United States by Film World Distributors in 1985.

The film was released on VHS by Starmaker Video in the late 1980s. It was later released on DVD in the United States by Anchor Bay Entertainment in 2002. This version is currently out of print. On April 10, 2012 Synapse released a Blu-ray/DVD combo pack of the film containing a new transfer and extras.

== Legacy ==
=== Following ===
A small but devoted cult following has arisen around this film. Josh Becker's website is notable for comments of some fans of the film, who hail it as one of the great works in American filmography. Some groups have even devoted significant new artwork to the film, including reimaging the soundtrack, re-editing the film and other "tributes". One of the best known fans group, based in Stockton, California, have commemorated the film through communal art projects, featuring extravagant parties to debut their creations; a tradition that has now lasted over 15 years.

LA Weekly, Letterboxd, Yardbarker, and The Grindhouse Database list this movie as belonging to the vetsploitation subgenre.

=== In popular culture ===
The dialogue between Stryker and the cult leader - where the latter declares: "I am Jesus Christ", and Stryker retorts: "No you're not...you're dead" - is sampled at the beginning of the Entombed song Out of Hand, from the album Wolverine Blues.
