= Lionheart (1990 film) =

1990 film directed by Sheldon Lettich

- Theatrical release poster
- Directed by: Sheldon Lettich
- Screenplay by: S. N. Warren; Sheldon Lettich; Jean-Claude Van Damme
- Story by: Jean-Claude Van Damme
- Produced by: Eric Karson; Ash R. Shah
- Starring: Jean-Claude Van Damme; Harrison Page; Deborah Rennard; Lisa Pelikan; Brian Thompson
- Cinematography: Robert C. New
- Edited by: Mark Conte
- Music by: John Scott
- Production companies: Wrong Bet Productions; Imperial Entertainment
- Distributed by: Universal Pictures
- Release dates: August 1, 1990 (France); January 11, 1991 (United States)
- Running time: 105 minutes
- Country: United States
- Language: English
- Budget: $6 million
- Box office: $24 million (domestic)

Lionheart is a 1990 American martial arts film directed by Sheldon Lettich, starring Jean-Claude Van Damme, Deborah Rennard, Harrison Page, Lisa Pelikan and Brian Thompson. It also features the acting debut of Ashley Johnson. Van Damme plays a French Foreign Legionnaire stationed in Africa, who must desert to the United States and enter the underground fighting circuit to raise money for his murdered brother's family.

The film premiered in France on August 1, 1990, and opened in the United States on January 11, 1991. It received lackluster reviews, but marked Van Damme's breakthrough as a theatrical leading man in North America. It was released in the United Kingdom as A.W.O.L: Absent Without Leave, and in Oceania as Wrong Bet, two early titles considered by the producers.

== Plot ==
Lyon Gaultier is in the French Foreign Legion stationed in Djibouti, East Africa. After his brother, who lives in Los Angeles, is set on fire during a drug deal gone bad, Lyon receives a letter from his sister-in-law Hélène begging him to come see his dying brother, who has been calling his name in agony. Lyon escapes the Legion in a daring breakout and sets off across the desert, until he reaches a dockyard on the coast, where he finds work aboard a tramp steamer headed for the United States. Lyon's Legion Commander, anticipating his destination, sends two of his own men to Los Angeles to bring Lyon back to meet court-martial.

Arriving in New York City with no money to cross the country to Los Angeles, Lyon is attracted to an illegal street fight being run by a tramp named Joshua Eldridge. He volunteers for the next fight and easily defeats his opponent. Impressed, Joshua takes Lyon to meet Cynthia Caldera, an unscrupulous organizer of underground fights for the rich elite. Cynthia agrees to sponsor Lyon, dubbing him "Lionheart" and setting him up in a no-holds-barred fight against Sonny, a fighter known for heavily taunting his opponents. Lyon defeats Sonny easily, then leaves with Joshua to find a phone booth to call Hélène, fending off an attack by a local street gang of punks. Joshua calls in a favor from Cynthia, who gets them both across the States to Los Angeles.

By the time Lyon reaches the hospital, his brother has died. Though his murderers were apprehended, Hélène was left penniless, with a stack of unpaid medical bills and little daughter Nicole to look after. Lyon and Joshua track down Hélène's address, but as Lyon tries to speak to Hélène, she angrily rejects his offers for much needed financial help, admonishing Lyon for deserting his brother and unjustly blaming him for her late husband's involvement in the drug business.

Lyon decides to help Hélène and Nicole without their knowledge. Through Cynthia, he joins the local street fighting circuit and has the profits delivered to Hélène in the form of checks, with Joshua claiming that her husband subscribed to life insurance prior to his death. Lyon defeats a number of high-profile fighters, including a dirty-fighting Scotsman, a wrestler in a racquetball court, and a martial artist in a shallow swimming pool. Seeing as Lyon is not keeping his winnings, and spurns her advances, Cynthia grows suspicious of Lyon and jealous towards Hélène and puts her assistant Russell on Lyon's trail. Similarly, the two Legionnaires sent after Lyon stake out Hélène's apartment and eventually try to capture Lyon: he is saved by Russell but suffers a broken rib. Hélène, who has witnessed the attack, learns the truth about the nonexistent insurance policy, whereupon she finally acknowledges Lyon as Nicole's uncle.

Cynthia arranges for Lyon to fight with Attila, an undefeated combatant whose style includes giving his opponents the illusion of a fighting chance, only to permanently disable them with callous finishing moves. Cynthia agrees to hand Lyon over to the Legionnaires after the fight. In order to skew the odds, she shows potential bettors an altered tape of Attila which makes him look like a poor fighter, while she bets her entire fortune on Attila. Realizing Lyon is hurt, Joshua unsuccessfully tries to talk him out of the fight.

As the fight proceeds, Attila recognizes Lyon's rib wound and takes full advantage of it. When Attila appears to have won after repeatedly knocking down his opponent, Joshua begs Lyon to give up the fight and offers to split the winnings from his own bet against Lyon. This angers Lyon, who summons his remaining strength to defeat Attila with a series of kicks, knee blows and brutal punches. Lyon pummels Attila senseless but spares him, leaving Cynthia with a big debt and his family cared for with his own winning stake. The Legionnaires capture Lyon, but with remorse listening to his niece's cry at the farewell to Lyon, they release him a couple of blocks away and wish him luck with his new life in America. The film ends with Lyon reunited with his family and Joshua.

== Cast ==
- Jean-Claude Van Damme as Lyon "Lionheart" Gaultier
- Harrison Page as Joshua Eldridge
- Deborah Rennard as Cynthia Caldera
- Lisa Pelikan as Hélène Gaultier
- Ashley Johnson as Nicole Gaultier
- Brian Thompson as Russell
- Vojislav Govedarica (Voyo Goric) as Sergeant Hartog
- Michel Qissi as Moustafa
- Abdel Qissi as Attila
- Ash Adams as Francois Gaultier
- George McDaniel as Adjutant
- Jeff Langton as Sonny
- Paco Christian Prieto as Pool Fighter
- Magic Schwarz as Racquetball Fighter
- Stuart F. Wilson as Scottish Fighter
- Clement von Franckenstein as English Investor
- Stefanos Miltsakakis as Jeep Driver
- Billy Blanks as African Legionnaire
- Tony "Satch" Williams as Garage Fighter
- James Brewster Thompson as N.Y. Monster Fighter
- Tony Halme as Security Guard
- Jeff Speakman as Mansion Security Man
- Christopher M. Brown as Punk Leader

== Production ==
=== Development and writing ===
Lionheart has its roots in two different projects. Van Damme had written an outline for an underground fighting film, called The Wrong Bet. Meanwhile, his friend Sheldon Lettich was working on a script about the French Foreign Legion intended for Sylvester Stallone, for whom he had already written Rambo III. Van Damme occasionally helped Lettich with French language terms. When that film did not get made, it was decided to integrate the legionnaire backstory into The Wrong Bet to flesh out its central character. A significant inspiration for the film was 1975's Hard Times, a favorite of both Van Damme and Lettich. The Wrong Bet followed a similar template, pairing a somber hero with a shifty yet endearing manager (respectively played by Charles Bronson and James Coburn in the classic film).

Sunil Shah of Imperial Entertainment, who had already worked with Van Damme on Black Eagle, was sold on the pitch. However he was reluctant to hire Lettich, whose WGA membership would entitle to substantial benefits and royalties. As Imperial regular Eric Karson was originally slated to direct, screenplay duties were assigned to his friend Stefani Warren, the writer of his previous movie Angel Town. Incidentally, Angel Town actor and Imperial contract player Olivier Gruner was a former French marine commando in real life. Looking to promote their in-house star, Imperial suggested him as a military advisor on The Wrong Bet, although his contributions were minimal.

When Warren turned in her first draft, it was deemed too sentimental to be commercially viable by everyone involved, except Karson, her friend and political ally at Imperial. At the insistence of Van Damme, Lettich was allowed to step in for a rewrite, and was eventually hired to direct. According to Lettich, the only contribution left from Warren's screenplay was the hero's nickname, "Lionheart". While her story was too slow-paced, Van Damme still hoped to show a more emotional side in the picture, as he had been hurt by previous criticism of his acting limitations. For this reason, he and Lettich decided to eschew the revenge plot common to many martial arts films, and never have the hero find his brother's killers, in order to focus on more uplifting themes. The film's budget projections started at a mere $3 million, and went up to $6 million.

=== Casting ===
Lionheart was cast by James Tarzia, who had worked on Best of the Best, and became the leading casting agent for fight films of the era. Fighters' auditions took place at Frank Dux's gym and drew close to one thousand candidates. Jeff Speakman served as line reader, substituting for Jean-Claude Van Damme during the film's casting sessions but, as he was trying to make his mark in acting without flaunting his martial arts skills, he only appeared in a non-fighting bit part. Brian Thompson, a good friend of Lettich's, was immediately hired as the main antagonist's right-hand man. Ashley Johnson, who plays Lyon's young niece, made her acting debut in this film. She was noticed when she accompanied family friends to an audition for the film while on a holiday trip to Los Angeles.

As in Kickboxer, the final antagonist, Attila, was supposed to be played by Van Damme's friend Mohammed "Michel" Qissi. However Qissi's brother Abdel, who had remained in Belgium and dismissed the pair's pursuit of a Hollywood career as a pipe dream, saw their success and asked Mohammed for a role. Mohammed relented and interceded in his favor with Imperial's Shah. The latter was reluctant due to Abdel's complete lack of film credentials, but consented to let him audition after Mohammed offered to cover his travel expenses. When Abdel was hired, Mohammed instead took the part of one of the legionnaires tracking down Lyon to the United States.

=== Filming ===
Principal photography began on November 8, 1989. The majority of the film was shot in the Los Angeles area, including scenes set in New York City. Jean Dry Lake, in the Nevada desert, stood in for Djibouti in the film's escape scene. As a first time director, Lettich felt challenged by some members of his crew, and had an especially contentious relationship with cinematographer Robert C. New, whom he came close to firing.

Fight choreography was a joint effort between Van Damme, Michel Qissi and Frank Dux. The tussle with Jeff Langton in the underground car park was originally one of the film's athletic showpieces, but Van Damme wanted to surprise the audience and suggested ending it quickly with a hit to the groin. Van Damme's nude scene also came at the actor's own request during the shoot.

=== Post production ===
==== Music ====
Stephen "Steve" Edwards, who would later become a martial arts film staple, produced a synthesizer demo for the film's score. However, Imperial brass saw the film's potential and extended the budget to give it a full orchestral score by British veteran John Scott. While it incorporated some of the composer's jazz background, Lettich expected more of that urban vibe, and did not feel Scott's work was a good fit for some scenes. For the intro to the pool fight, he reinserted one of Edward's demo tracks. Another scene was amped up with a licensed song by Bill Wray.

==== Alternate versions ====
The domestic cut supervised by Universal is different from the so-called "international version" which, not accounting for edits mandated by local censors, was the one seen theatrically in foreign territories. The international version is longer, but the Universal version still features minor tidbits and alternate material that are absent from the international one. The international version, in uncut form, was seen during the film's French debut, as well as during its U.K bow.

== Release ==
=== Pre-release ===
The film was screened at the Cannes Film Market on May 18, 1990, under the title A.W.O.L. On August 2, 1990, it was reported that the film had been picked up by Universal Studios in the U.S. It was Van Damme's first film to be released by a major studio in the territory.

=== Theatrical ===
Lionheart debuted on August 1, 1990, in France, where the star had accrued an early following thanks to his francophone background. Released there as Full Contact, it became his first film to cross the symbolic one-million-spectator threshold in the country, finishing with 1,226,025 admissions.

In the United States, the film opened on January 11, 1991. It was another breakthrough for the actor, debuting in 3rd position with sales in excess of $7 million during its first weekend. Although it fell down the charts rather quickly, the film finished its domestic run with a tally of $24,078,196, by far the best of Van Damme's career up to that point.

=== Home media ===
The film made its domestic home video debut on VHS on June 25, 1991, through MCA/Universal Home Video. Like the theatrical version, the U.K. version from Guild Home Video was uncut, and arrived on December 3, 1990. In addition to a trimmed M-rated VHS that matched the country's theatrical cut, Australia received an uncut R18+ reissue from Palace Entertainment and Roadshow.

On June 12, 2018, the film received a special edition Blu-ray from MVD Entertainment Group as part of their "MVD Rewind" line, to which Van Damme and Lettich have personally collaborated. It contains an extended version clocking at 110:17, which Lettich calls "very close to the Director's Cut [he] had originally turned in to the producers."

== Reception ==
On Rotten Tomatoes, the film has a 45% rating based on 22 reviews. On Metacritic it has a score of 41% based on reviews from 10 critics, indicating "mixed or average" reviews. Audiences polled by CinemaScore gave the film an average grade of "B+" on an A+ to F scale.

Michael Wilmington of the Los Angeles Times called it "a sub-Schwarzenegger thriller" that "has that grotesquely off-scale exaggeration of many post-'80s action movies." Richard Harrington of The Washington Post described it as "really little more than a change of costume and locations for an overly familiar plot." Owen Gleiberman of Entertainment Weekly had a slightly more favorable opinion of the film, saying that it "is nicely shot and edited, and it comes about as close to being a real movie as you get in this genre."

Lionheart (Original Motion Picture Soundtrack)

Film score by John Scott
- Released: 1990
- Recorded: Bavaria Music Studios, Munich
- Genre: Orchestral
- Length: 63:58
- Label: Intrada Records
- Producer: John Scott

John Scott chronology
King of the Wind (1990)	Lionheart (1990)	William the Conqueror (1990)

== Soundtrack ==
Lionheart's score was composed and produced by John Scott, and recorded by the Munich Symphony Orchestra. Intrada Records released the film's soundtrack album on CD in 1990. Subsequent reissues by German label DigiDreams include the licensed song "No Mercy" by Bill Wray, which features in the film but was omitted from the Intrada version.

Some of the cues composed for the film by Steve Edwards were released on a 1998 promotional CD compilation of his work by his talent agency SMC, and simply titled Film Music.

== Legacy ==
While Van Damme went on to appear in bigger and more lucrative films, he has acknowledged the picture's enduring popularity with his fans, saying, "The audience loves Lionheart because it's sincere with the relationships, brotherhood, friendship, love, betrayal." During a promotional interview for Knock Off, Van Damme mentioned Timecop and Lionheart as the two films of his that people should see. Lettich added that "Van Damme's female fans seem especially enamored of this film because it was the first (and possibly the best) to showcase JCVD's softer, more compassionate side. [...] He's getting himself bruised and bloodied in these brutal street fights so that his little niece can get a new bicycle.

A follow-up to Lionheart has been considered on several occasions. In 2014, director Albert Pyun said that he had been approached to direct a remake of the film. By 2016, the film was listed in the production slate of Moonstone Entertainment, owner of the Imperial library since 2013, but it did not happen. In February 2018, Van Damme announced on social media that an actual sequel—simply called Lionheart 2—would enter production later that year, but it was quickly called off.
