= The Order (2001 film) =

2001 action film by Sheldon Lettich

- DVD cover
- Directed by: Sheldon Lettich
- Written by: Jean-Claude Van Damme; Les Weldon
- Produced by: Avi Lerner
- Starring: Jean-Claude Van Damme; Charlton Heston; Sofia Milos; Brian Thompson; Vernon Dobtcheff
- Cinematography: David Gurfinkel
- Edited by: Donn Aron; Alain Jakubowicz
- Music by: Pino Donaggio
- Production companies: Millennium Films; 777 Films Corporation; Order Productions
- Distributed by: TriStar Pictures
- Release dates: December 27, 2001 (Russia); March 12, 2002 (United States)
- Running time: 89 minutes
- Country: United States
- Languages: Syriac; Aramaic; English; Arabic; French; Hebrew; Ukrainian
- Budget: $12 million
- Box office: $524,637

The Order is a 2001 American action film directed by Sheldon Lettich, and written by Jean-Claude Van Damme, who also starred in the film. The film was released on direct-to-DVD in the United States on March 12, 2002.

== Plot ==
The film opens in 1099 at the end of the First Crusade, depicting Christian Crusaders sacking Jerusalem and slaughtering the local population. A Flemish Christian knight named Charles Le Vaillant (Jean-Claude Van Damme) becomes demoralized by the horrors of war and decides to create a new religious order. This new order brings together members from the three main religions of the region: Christians, Jews, and Muslims. As a self-declared leader and messiah, Charles writes the sacred texts of the Order. While traveling to Syria, his camp is attacked by the Christian knights, who kill Le Vaillant. The last chapter from their religious text, buried by Le Vaillant in a secret place, becomes lost in the desert after the attack.

In the modern day, Rudy Cafmeyer (Jean-Claude van Damme), a thief and smuggler of valuable historical artifacts, breaks into a high-security building and steals a precious Fabergé egg. He triggers an alarm in the process and is forced to fight his way out of the building, finding no car to meet him because the getaway driver, Yuri, was forced to leave by police. His problems are compounded when a potential buyer attempts to steal the egg and falls on it, destroying it.

It is revealed that Rudy's father is archaeologist and museum curator Oscar "Ozzie" Cafmeyer (Vernon Dobtcheff). Ozzie travels to Israel in search of a secret he has discovered and is kidnapped while on the phone with Rudy, who travels to Jerusalem to rescue him. Ozzie's associate, Professor Walt Finley (Charlton Heston), gives Rudy the key to a safe-deposit box in East Jerusalem before being gunned down by unknown assailants. Rudy opens the safe-deposit box and finds an ancient map showing a series of tunnels and a treasure room beneath Jerusalem.

Meanwhile, a devout contingent of Le Vaillant's followers known as the Order continues to practice his peaceful teachings in Israel. One of the disciples, Cyrus (Brian Thompson), enters into conflict with the Order's leader Pierre Gaudet over Cyrus's inflammatory rhetoric regarding an imminent holy war. Cyrus has Pierre Gaudet killed using a car bomb and assumes control of the Order.

Israeli Police Chief Ben Ner (Ben Cross) views Rudy's arrival with hostility and takes steps to have Rudy deported, appointing Lt. Dalia Barr (Sofia Milos) to ensure that Rudy does not escape. Lt. Barr escorts Rudy to the airplane but Ben Ner calls and demands their return, claiming that Rudy is smuggling an artifact. Lt. Barr knows that Rudy has been searched and is not in possession of any artifacts so she unlocks Rudy's handcuffs and lets him escape in a feigned struggle, meeting up with him again after he escapes from the airport in a stolen ramp-towing vehicle. Lt. Barr reveals that she was once a disciple of the Order but that she left when she was 18. Together they visit Yuri, who translates the map and explains that it leads to treasure, but thieves break in and steal the map, shooting and killing Yuri in the process. Rudy steals a motorcycle and pursues the thief who has the map. He catches up with him and shoots him, causing the thief to drop the map, but is also shot and injured.

Rudy hides from the police and is found by Lt. Barr, who drives him to be helped back to health by her old friend Avram, who is still a member of the Order. Lt. Barr gives Rudy papers left by his father in which Ozzie explains he had discovered the lost manuscripts of the Order, lost since the Crusades, and that the new sect within the Order does not wish for them to be revealed because they show the location of a mythical Jewish treasure. Rudy shows it to Avram, who insists that the "treasure" is merely a metaphor for the wisdom of the ancient sages and says that its location in the Order's monastery cannot be accessed by outsiders anyway. With Avram's aid Rudy and Lt. Barr pose as foreign members of the Order visiting on a pilgrimage in order to gain access to the monastery during a massive assembly of the members, now led by Cyrus.

In the catacombs Rudy finds the remaining manuscripts as well as his imprisoned father and a large bomb. Ben Ner arrives and explains to Rudy and Lt. Barr that he joined the Order when he found out about the treasure. Cyrus arrives and forces Ozzie to lead him through the tunnels in order to detonate the bomb under the Temple Mount during Ramadan to maximize casualties and make martyrs of the Israeli Lt. Barr and American Rudy Cafmeyer in order to trigger World War III. Rudy saves Avram from falling into a pit trap before they reach a room loaded with treasure next to the chamber underneath the Well of Souls. Ben Ner attempts to delay the detonation in order to collect more treasure, leading to a standoff with Cyrus's followers. Rudy, and Lt. Barr use the opportunity to escape but Ozzy is injured and Avram is killed. Lt. Barr shoots Ben Ner and helps Ozzie out of the catacombs. Rudy catches Cyrus in the treasure room and kills him with one of the swords found there. Rudy moves the bomb from under the Well of Souls and drops it into the pit trap. Ben Ner jumps at Rudy but only grabs his shirt and tears it off as he falls into the pit. Rudy races away from the pit as the bomb explodes. Worshipers above hear the explosion but continue praying.

Rudy is later shown visiting the office of his father, who has published a new book. In the office Rudy finds an ancient map that Ozzie claims shows the location of the Seven Cities of Gold. Rudy grabs the map and runs out of the office with Dalia. The film ends with a compilation of quick action cuts as well as a few outtakes.

== Cast ==
- Jean-Claude Van Damme as Rudy Cafmeyer / Charles Le Vaillant
- Charlton Heston as Professor Walter Finley
- Sofia Milos as Lieutenant Dalia Barr
- Brian Thompson as Second / First Disciple Cyrus Jacob
- Ben Cross as Chief Ben Ner
- Vernon Dobtcheff as Oscar "Ozzie" Cafmeyer
- Sasson Gabai as Yuri (credited as Sasson Gabay)
- Alon Aboutboul as Avram
- Joey Tomaska as Joey
- Peter Malota as Amnon
- Sharon Reginiano as Bassam
- Sami Huri as Lieutenant Itsik
- Abdel Qissi as Big Arab

== Production ==
Director Sheldon Lettich later recalled:

Tonally we wanted to make a movie that was in the vein of "fun" action-adventure movies like the Indiana Jones films and Hitchcock movies like North by Northwest. One big mistake that we made with The Order was taking the tone in a more serious direction in the third act. Had we maintained the light-heartedness all the way to the end, I believe the film would have been far more successful. For me the highlight of that movie is the chase through the Old City of Jerusalem, with Van Damme disguised as a Hasidic Jew, running from and fighting with the Israeli police. It was utterly wacky and outrageous, and to this day I'm still amazed that I convinced Jean-Claude to do it.

== Box office ==
In Spain the movie was released in theatres in 2002 and was seen by well over 100,000 people with a total gross of almost 600,000 euros. In Mexico the movie did just as well, grossing over $560,000. Though not issued in cinemas in the United States, the movie did well on rentals, netting over $18 million. The Order was also issued on Video and DVD in the United Kingdom and Germany.
