= If I Had a Hammer (film) =

1999 American film

- Directed by: Josh Becker
- Written by: Josh Becker
- Produced by: Jane Goe
- Starring: Susan Reno; Kristian Monday
- Cinematography: Kurt Rauf
- Edited by: Kaye Davis
- Release date: 1999
- Country: United States
- Language: English
- Budget: $350,000

If I Had a Hammer is a 1999 independent film starring Susan Reno and Kristian Monday and written and directed by Josh Becker.
