= Bloodsport (film) =

1988 film directed by Newt Arnold

- Theatrical release poster
- Directed by: Newt Arnold
- Screenplay by: Christopher Cosby; Mel Friedman; Sheldon Lettich
- Story by: Sheldon Lettich
- Produced by: Mark DiSalle; Yoram Globus; Menachem Golan
- Starring: Jean-Claude Van Damme; Donald Gibb; Leah Ayres; Norman Burton; Forest Whitaker; Bolo Yeung
- Cinematography: David Worth
- Edited by: Carl Kress; Michael J. Duthie
- Music by: Paul Hertzog; Stan Bush
- Production company: Cannon Films
- Distributed by: Cannon Films
- Release date: February 26, 1988
- Running time: 92 minutes
- Countries: United States; Hong Kong
- Language: English
- Budget: $1.5–2.3 million
- Box office: $50 million

Bloodsport is a 1988 martial arts film directed by Newt Arnold and starring Jean-Claude Van Damme. The film centers on Frank Dux (Van Damme), a United States Army captain and ninjutsu practitioner who goes absent without leave to compete in an underground full-contact martial arts tournament called the Kumite in Hong Kong. The film was one of Van Damme's first lead roles, launching his career as a mainstream action star.

Marketed as a true story, the screenplay drew from a 1980 Black Belt piece detailing Dux's purported real-life exploits. Dux served as a technical advisor on the film, but many of his claims were subsequently disputed, including by co-screenwriter Sheldon Lettich, who stated that Dux fabricated his fight record and the existence of the Kumite.

Released by Cannon Films on February 26, 1988, Bloodsport was a commercial success, grossing $50 million against a $1.5–2.3 million budget despite negative reviews. The film helped spark a resurgence of the American martial arts genre, influenced the development of mixed martial arts, and gained a cult following.

== Plot ==
U.S. Army Captain Frank Dux, who has trained in the ways of ninjutsu since childhood under sensei Senzo Tanaka (seen in an extended flashback sequence), receives an invitation to the Kumite, a three-day underground martial arts tournament in Hong Kong. Going absent without leave, Dux travels to Hong Kong, prompting the Criminal Investigation Command to dispatch agents Helmer and Rawlins to track him down and arrest him.

Upon arriving, Dux befriends fellow American Vale Tudo fighter Ray Jackson. At the tournament venue, Dux establishes his lineage with the Tanaka clan by executing the Dim Mak strike. On the opening day, he shatters reigning champion Chong Li's record for the fastest knockout. Meanwhile, Helmer and Rawlins arrive in Hong Kong and coordinate with local police inspector Chen.

On the second day, Dux continues his winning streak, while Jackson advances until a brutal match against Chong Li ends with him incapacitated and hospitalized.

Intercepted by Helmer, Rawlins, and local police as he arrives for the final day, Dux fights past them to enter the arena. In the semifinals, Li kills his opponent. During the final match, a desperate Li blinds Dux by crushing a concealed capsule of salt hidden in his waistband and throwing it into his face. Drawing on his blindfolded training with Tanaka, Dux overcomes his temporary blindness, defeats Li, and forces his submission.

== Cast ==
- Jean-Claude Van Damme as Frank Dux
- Donald Gibb as Ray Jackson
- Leah Ayres as Janice Kent
- Norman Burton as CID Agent Helmer
- Forest Whitaker as CID Agent Rawlins
- Bolo Yeung as Chong Li
- Ken Siu as Victor Lin
- Roy Chiao as Senzo Tanaka
- Philip Chan as Captain Chen
- Lily Leung as Mrs. Tanaka
- Paulo Tocha as Paco
- Michel Qissi as Suan Paredes
- Ken Boyle as Colonel Cooke

== Production ==
=== Writing ===
Screenwriter Sheldon Lettich said the film was inspired by Frank Dux's "tall tales" about the Kumite, "most of which turned out to be bullshit."

=== Casting ===
The film was Jean-Claude Van Damme's first leading role in a feature film. He had previously worked as an extra and stuntman in Cannon Films productions, but at the time of his casting was a struggling actor with bouts of homelessness, and was only offered the role after "almost begging" Cannon president Menahem Golan. Van Damme's role as a villain in the low-budget film No Retreat, No Surrender (1985) convinced producers of his potential.

On casting Van Damme, producer DiSalle said, "I wanted a new martial arts star who was a ladies' man. Jean-Claude appeals to both men and women. He's an American hero who fights for justice the American way and kicks the stuffing out of the bad guys."

=== Filming ===
Bloodsport was filmed entirely on location in Hong Kong. Shooting began on October 17, 1986. It was the first American feature film made entirely in the city since 1969. Promotional materials indicated that the Kumite which Frank Dux won in 1975 was held in the Bahamas, but producers opted to set the story in Hong Kong because the city was "exciting and not over-exposed" in American films.

Bloodsport is one of the few films featuring scenes filmed inside Kowloon Walled City before its demolition in 1993. Other locations included the Peninsula Hotel, Causeway Bay, Hong Kong Trail, Victoria Peak, and Stanley Fort.

The fight scenes were choreographed by the real Frank Dux and veteran Hong Kong stuntman Lee Ka-ting.

== Soundtrack ==
Bloodsport's soundtrack score was composed by Paul Hertzog, who subsequently scored Van Damme's Kickboxer. The songs "Fight to Survive" and "On My Own" were performed by Stan Bush, though album versions featured alternative vocals by Paul Delph. The soundtrack has since received specialty physical reissues by labels including Perseverance Records (2007) and Waxwork Records (2021).

== Release ==
=== Home media ===
Bloodsport was released on VHS and Betamax by Warner Home Video on December 21, 1988. Within a few months, it had sold some 150,000 units. Warner also released a DVD of the film in the United States on October 1, 2002.

Multiple Blu-ray versions have been released throughout the years, the earliest in 2010 and the latest, including 4K versions, in 2023 and beyond. The older releases feature only stereo audio, while the most recent ones also feature surround mixes.

== Reception ==
=== Box office ===
In January 1989, the Los Angeles Times reported a U.S. box office gross of $11.7 million against a budget of $2.3 million. In August 1989, the Chicago Tribune reported that the film pulled in $50 million worldwide, including $15 million in the U.S. and Canada, making it the Cannon Group's most profitable film of 1988.

=== Critical response ===
Review aggregator Rotten Tomatoes reports a 48% approval rating based on 31 reviews. The site's consensus reads: "This is where it all began for the Muscles from Brussels, but beyond Van Damme's athleticism, Bloodsport is a clichéd, virtually plotless exercise in action movie recycling." On Metacritic the film has a weighted average score of 29 out of 100, based on 5 critics, indicating "generally unfavorable" reviews. /Film regards it as one of the most influential martial arts movies of all time.

Leonard Klady of the Los Angeles Times wrote, "Hacking through the jungle of cliche and reservoir of bad acting in Bloodsport [...] are some pretty exciting matches."

Bloodsport has been regarded as a cult film.

=== Accolades ===
Van Damme was nominated for a Golden Raspberry Award for Worst New Star, but lost to Ronald McDonald in Mac and Me at the 9th Golden Raspberry Awards.

== Sequels ==
Bloodsport spawned four sequels: Bloodsport II: The Next Kumite (1996), Bloodsport III (1997), Bloodsport 4: The Dark Kumite (1999) and Lady Bloodfight (2016). None feature Van Damme or the Frank Dux character.

== Possible remake ==
A remake of Bloodsport was reported to be in planning in 2011. Phillip Noyce was attached to direct a screenplay by Robert Mark Kamen. The main character was supposed to be an American Afghanistan War veteran competing in a vale tudo tournament in Brazil. Director James McTeigue was attached to the project by 2013, and the filming was to be shot in Australia and Brazil. In 2026, a new remake was announced to be produced by A24 and written and directed by Michaela Coel.

== Legacy ==
According to the American Film Institute, the success of Bloodsport helped the resurgence of the martial arts film genre in America.

Bloodsport was an inspiration for the video game Mortal Kombat, and Johnny Cage, one of the characters, is a homage to Jean-Claude Van Damme. Van-Damme himself later voiced a Johnny Cage character skin based on his likeness in Mortal Kombat 1.

In 2024, Capelight Pictures released The Last Kumite, a crowd-funded film "inspired by the likes of Bloodsport, Kickboxer and No Retreat, No Surrender". Several people with ties to the original films were attached to the project, including Kurt McKinney, Michel Qissi and Bolo Yeung's son David Yeung.

The professional wrestling event GCW Bloodsport, created by mixed martial artist Josh Barnett, is named after the film.

=== Influence on combat sports ===
Mixed martial arts (MMA) writers have noted Bloodsport's influence on the early iterations of the Ultimate Fighting Championship (UFC), which featured a similarly laissez-faire approach to weight classes and style-against-style matchups, before the establishment of more formalized rulesets.

Retired professional mixed martial artist and kickboxer Mirko Cro Cop, inspired by Van Damme's performance in the film, began training in his parents' garage with his father Žarko Filipović's boxing equipment and weights.

Jean-Claude Van Damme said the film "helped give the martial arts genre a boost but also foretold certain things like the Ultimate Fighting Championship and the idea of pitting different styles against each other."
