= Paul Hertzog =

American film composer

- Born: U.S.
- Occupations: Film composer and educator

Paul Hertzog is an American film composer and educator. In his brief career in the late 1980s and early 1990s, Hertzog composed the soundtracks for two Jean-Claude Van Damme movies, Kickboxer and Bloodsport, as well as the scores for Breathing Fire and My Chauffeur. Hertzog was a teacher at Hart High School in Santa Clarita, California, where he taught English and Music Theory.

After a nearly twenty-year hiatus, Hertzog released a CD titled Freeing the Waters in 2009. It consisted of previously unreleased tracks written during his years as a film composer.

Early in 2015, Hertzog released a CD of new music, reminiscent of his work in "Bloodsport" and "Kickboxer," titled "Waking the Dragon." He composed, performed and recorded this latest CD.

== Film scores ==
- My Chauffeur (1986)
- Bloodsport (1988)
- Kickboxer (1989)
- Breathing Fire (1991)
- The Last Kumite (2024)

== Soundtracks ==
Soundtrack CDs for both Kickboxer and Bloodsport were created in limited quantity. Because of this, they are considered collector's items by many, and are usually very hard to find.

Hertzog worked with Stan Bush on both scores.

=== Bloodsport track list ===
1. Fight to Survive (02:23) – performed by Paul Delph
2. Kumite (Main Title) (02:39)
3. Father and Son / Training (04:24)
4. The Tree and the Sword / In Hong Kong / The Walled City / Ceremony (07:43)
5. Chong Li kills (02:50)
6. On My Own - Alone (03:34) – performed by Paul Delph
7. The Second Day (04:23)
8. The Morning After (02:45)
9. Preparation (02:32)
10. Dim Mak (01:59)
11. Powder (03:42)
12. Triumph (02:33)
13. I love Connor (3:33)

On June 26, 2007, a limited edition re-release of the soundtrack on CD by record label Perseverance Records was created. This release is considered by fans of the soundtrack as a vast improvement over all previous releases as the CD contains for the first time, the original versions of the tracks performed by Stan Bush as heard in the motion picture. The track listing for this limited-edition version is as follows:

1. "Steal the Night" (04:28) – performed by Michael Bishop
2. Kumite (02:25)
3. Captain (00:23)
4. Flashback/Martial Science/Father & Son/Training/Tree & Sword (10:20)
5. In Hong Kong (00:58)
6. The Walled City (01:53)
7. Dim Mak (00:42)
8. Police (00:14)
9. First Day: Ceremony/ First Fight/Good, Bad, Ugly/Dux vs Arab (04:31)
10. "Fight to Survive" (02:02) – performed by Stan Bush
11. Morning After (01:55)
12. Second Day (04:25)
13. Samoan Balls (02:16)
14. Jackson Falls (01:28)
15. "On My Own – Alone" (02:12) – performed by Stan Bush
16. Here for the Final?/Inspector, No! (00:57)
17. Paco vs Dux (02:20)
18. Chong Li Kills (01:29)
19. Preparation (00:49)
20. Finals/Powder/Triumph (07:28)
21. "Fight to Survive" (End Title) (02:40) – performed by Stan Bush
22. "Steal the Night" (instrumental version) (04:32)

=== Kickboxer track list ===
Similarly to Bloodsport, the soundtrack to Kickboxer was remastered in 2006 and released by Perseverance Records. The track listing for the 2006 full score CD is as follows:

1. To the Hospital / We'll See (01:15)
2. Groceries (01:47)
3. Very Stupid (00:45)
4. Tai Chi (02:55)
5. First Kiss (00:53)
6. Stone City (02:34)
7. Second Stone (00:53)
8. Hospital (02:21)
9. Palm Tree (00:30)
10. Advanced Training (01:49)
11. Ancient Voices (02:08)
12. Mylee Is the Way (01:32)
13. Warriors (00:45)
14. Buddha's Eagle (01:01)
15. Kidnap (01:01)
16. You've Done It Before (01:45)
17. Downstairs (00:54)
18. Round One (02:12)
19. Round Two (01:36)
20. The Hook (01:32)
21. Round Three (01:32)
22. The Eagle Lands (04:02)

=== Freeing the Waters track list ===
1. The Violet Hour (2:46)
2. April Fools' Day (5:48)
3. Walk on Wide Water (5:01)
4. A Wicked Plot (3:50)
5. Kyoto Forest (5:49)
6. Sue Across the Sea (5:29)
7. Black Pearls (6:12)
8. Love in a Labyrinth (6:34)
9. Freeing the Waters (4:26)
