= Bloodmatch =

- Directed by: Albert Pyun
- Written by: K. Hannah
- Produced by: Rick Blumenthal; Albert Pyun
- Starring: Thom Mathews; Vincent Klyn; Michel Qissi; Benny "The Jet" Urquidez; Hope Marie Carlton; Marianne Taylor; Jason Brooks; Peter Cunningham
- Cinematography: George Mooradian
- Edited by: Paul O'Bryan
- Music by: Paul Edwards; Anthony Riparetti
- Production companies: Power Pictures Corporation; 21st Century Film Corporation
- Distributed by: HBO Video (1991) (US) (video)
- Release dates: May 1991 (Cannes Film Market); August 21, 1991 (U.S. video)
- Running time: 86 mins
- Country: United States
- Language: English

Bloodmatch is a 1991 martial-arts film directed by Albert Pyun and starring Thom Mathews, Hope Marie Carlton, Marianne Taylor, Vincent Klyn, Michel Qissi, and Benny "The Jet" Urquidez.

== Plot ==
The film opens with Brick Bardo, who is investigating the death of his brother, chasing Davey, who attempts to fight him, resulting in Davey getting knocked out and tied up to the ground in the boiling sun. Davey tells Brick that his brother was involved in a fixed kickboxing fight scheme, which resulted in his murder. Brick demands the names of the people responsible for his brother's death. Davey names Brent Caldwell, Mike Johnson, Billy Munoz, and Connie Angel.

Brick kidnaps all four and ties them up in front of a ring at an abandoned arena in Las Vegas. They wonder why they are there. Connie remembers Wood Wilson, an old boyfriend who defeated her in an intergender kickboxing match, and who is revealed to be Brick's brother. Brick intends to use the ring as his interrogation room, fighting each of the four until he gets answers. Additionally, Brick has also kidnapped Billy's daughter to bait Billy.

Mike goes first. If he wins, everyone goes free, but if Brick wins, Mike dies and the rest will continue to be interrogated. Just when Mike is about to die, Billy offers to talk. At first getting the upper hand, Billy lets his emotions get the best of him after Brick taunts him about his daughter. Brick breaks Billy's back, killing him.

Brent is third in line. He attempts to pull a knife on Max, but has the gun pointed to him. Connie deduces that Brent killed Wood Wilson. As Brick fights Brent, a barely breathing Mike crawls towards Connie and hands her the knife Brent had earlier and uses it to kill Max. In the ring, an enraged Brick tells Brent, who is begging for his life, that Wood didn't beg for his life. When Brent asks how he knew, Brick reveals that he was there and kills Brent.

Brick finally reveals to Connie the whole truth. Brick is actually Wood Wilson. Connie doesn't believe it, but Brick confesses he survived being viciously beaten by Brent five years ago and had his face changed through plastic surgery. Connie admits she was behind the scheme in order to make enough money so she and Wood could escape together, but Wood didn't want to participate. Connie admits she was wrong for choosing money over love. Brick and Connie fight with Brick/Wood being defeated by Connie in the end.

Some time later, it is revealed that Connie will be the legal guardian to Billy's kids.

== Cast ==
- Thom Mathews as "Brick" Bardo
- Hope Marie Carlton as Connie Angel
- Marianne Taylor as Max Manduke
- Benny "The Jet" Urquidez as Billy Munoz
- Dale Jacoby as Brent Caldwell
- Thunder Wolf as Mike Johnson
- Jason Brooks as Steve Buscomo
- Hector Peña as Sam Gitty
- Peter Cunningham as Dwayne Ryan
- Patrick Outlaw Buckley as Walker Stevens
- Vincent Klyn as Carl Cuba
- Michel Qissi as Davey O'Brien
- Christian Andrews as Jack Kelly

== Reception ==
Bloodmatch received almost universally negative reviews. TV Guide gave it just one star out of five in a review that stated:

"Spattered blood, broken bones, bodies on the canvas ... The violence, without clear motive, is foolish, pointless and, by some standards, grotesque."

MonsterHunter described the movie as being "borderline compelling in a minor trainwreck sort of way" and "nothing more than a curiosity that’s unsuccessful at whatever it was trying to accomplish". ComeuppanceReviews called it "dour, dry, dark and overlong at 85 minutes".
