= Abdel Qissi =

Moroccan actor and boxer (born 1960)

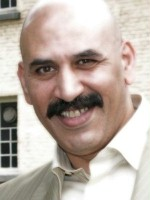
- Born: 20 January 1960 (age 66); Oujda, Morocco
- Nationality: Moroccan

Other information
- Notable relatives: Michel Qissi (brother)

Abdel Qissi (born 20 January 1960) is a Moroccan-Belgian actor and former professional boxer with eight recorded fights in the early 1980s. As an actor, Abdel debuted as the antagonist Attila in Lionheart (1990), opposite Jean-Claude Van Damme's character. He went on to appear with Van Damme in two more films, The Quest (1996), where Abdel played the main antagonist Khan, and The Order (2001).

== Biography ==
=== Life ===
Qissi was born in Oujda, Morocco and moved to Brussels, Belgium in his early years. In the 1980s he had a boxing career of eight fights consisting of five wins, two via knockout, one draw and two losses. Through his brother Michel, Qissi later became an associate of Jean-Claude Van Damme to which he starred in some of Van Damme's movies.

=== Political career ===
Qissi took part in the 2006 and 2012 Ixelles local elections on the lists of the Mouvement Réformateur (MR), a right-wing political party. However, he was never directly elected, winning 322 votes and then 148 votes. In February 2012 (8 months before the October 2012 elections), he was indirectly elected to replace Vanessa Cuevas, who had moved from Ixelles.

== Professional boxing record ==
8 fights	5 wins	2 losses
By knockout	2	1
By decision	3	1
Draws	1	

No.	Result	Record	Opponent	Type	Round, time	Date	Location	Notes
8	Loss	5–2–1	(Belgium) Marco Vitagliano	PTS		13 November 1981	Sint-Truiden	
7	Win	5–1–1	(Italy) Antimo Tescione	TKO		24 October 1981	Ixelles	
6	Draw	4–1–1	(Belgium) Marco Vitagliano	PTS		24 April 1981	Ixelles	
5	Loss	4–1	(Mali) Mary Konate	TKO		31 January 1981	Ixelles	
4	Win	4–0	(France) Fred Voltine	PTS		15 November 1980	Ixelles	
3	Win	3–0	(Belgium) Roberto Bosio	TKO		24 October 1980	Molenbeek-Saint-Jean	
2	Win	2–0	(Italy) Alessandro Casanova	PTS		26 April 1980	Molenbeek-Saint-Jean	
1	Win	1–0	(France) Lassine Niare	PTS		28 March 1980	Ixelles	

== Filmography ==
Year	Title	Role	Notes
1990	Lionheart	Attila	
1993	Shadow Boxing	Corner Man	Short
1996	The Quest	Khan (Mongolian Fighter)	
2001	The Order	Big Arab	
2001	Los Bravos		
2018	Agents of S.H.I.E.L.D.		2 Episodes
2024	The Last Kumite	Detective Dobrev	
