= Michel Qissi =

Moroccan actor and filmmaker (born 1962)

Michel Qissi ميشيل قيسي
- Born: Mohammed Qissi; 12 September 1962 (age 63); Oujda, Morocco
- Occupations: Actor, filmmaker, martial artist, fight choreographer, producer, director
- Years active: 1982–present
- Spouse: Jeanette Qissi (divorced)
- Relatives: Abdel Qissi (brother)

Michel Qissi (Arabic: ميشيل قيسي; born Mohammed Qissi on 12 September 1962) is a Moroccan-Belgian actor, filmmaker, and martial artist best known for his action films. Born in Oujda but raised in Brussels, in 1982 Qissi emigrated to Hollywood together with childhood friend Jean-Claude Van Damme in search of becoming an action star. Bloodsport (1988) was their first major film. The two had previously collaborated on Breakin' (1984), and went on to appear in Kickboxer (1989), in which Qissi portrayed the Thai villain Tong Po, Lionheart (1990), and Kickboxer: Vengeance (2016). Qissi also had the role of a fight trainer for Van Damme in the action cyberpunk film Cyborg (1989) and served as choreographer on Kickboxer.

In 1991, Qissi reprised his role as Tong Po in Kickboxer 2 and starred in Bloodmatch. In 1993, he starred in his directorial debut film Terminator Woman, opposite Karen Sheperd and Jerry Trimble. In 2001, he directed, co-wrote, and starred in Extreme Force, which became a vehicle for Argentinian martial arts star Héctor Echavarría. Aside from his American films, Qissi has also worked in Moroccan films and television series. In 2014, he directed and starred in the well-received action adventure film Bara, which was shot in Morocco.

Qissi is the co-founder of The World Cinema Combat Federation (WCCF), an organization he formed with Grand Master Beom Jhoo Lee which teaches fight choreography in filmmaking. Prior to working in the film industry, Qissi competed as an amateur boxer. He is also trained in the styles of Shotokan, Muay Thai, and kickboxing.

== Early life ==
Qissi was born in Oujda, Morocco, and moved to Brussels, Belgium, at the age of 2. He commenced training in boxing at seven years of age, and became an amateur champion in his weight class at 17. He also went on to study Shotokan Karate, Muay Thai and Kickboxing. He befriended Jean-Claude Van Damme at an early age and they grew up together with the same love for action films and training in martial arts. Growing up, he was inspired by Bruce Lee and Muhammad Ali.

== Film career ==
In 1982, Qissi and Van Damme moved to the United States in the hope of becoming action stars. In 1984 they both were cast as extras in the film Breakin', before landing their big break in 1986. After obtaining an interview with Menahem Golan of Cannon Films, they secured a three-picture deal, the first of which was the highly successful Bloodsport, in which Van Damme starred and Qissi had a small role as a tournament fighter named Suan Paredes. In 1989, Qissi and Van Damme teamed up again for the film Kickboxer, in which Van Damme was the protagonist once more and Qissi the film's main villain, Tong Po. Qissi was also a choreographer on the film. His role as Tong Po provided visual inspiration for the Mortal Kombat character Goro.

Qissi had the role of a fight trainer for Van Damme in the sci-fi film Cyborg (1989).

1990 saw Qissi and Van Damme make the film Lionheart, in which Qissi's brother, Abdel, played the villain. This was to be the last film Van Damme and Qissi made together for 26 years. They briefly appeared together in Kickboxer: Vengeance (2016).

In 1991, Qissi reprised his role as Tong Po in Kickboxer 2 (1991). He also appeared in Bloodmatch, alongside Thom Mathews, Hope Marie Carlton, Marianne Taylor, Vincent Klyn, and Benny Urquidez. In 1993, he starred in his directorial debut film Terminator Woman, opposite Karen Sheperd and Jerry Trimble. He directed, co-wrote, and starred in Extreme Force (2001), which became a vehicle for Argentinian martial arts star Héctor Echavarría.

Aside from his American films, Qissi has also worked in Moroccan films and television series. He has said regarding Moroccan cinema, "Moroccan cinema remains a school where management is done with very modest and simple resources." He has praised Moroccan filmmakers such as Ibrahim Shukri, Yassin Fannan, Mohamed Nasrat, and Said Naciri.

In 2014, Qissi directed and starred in the action adventure movie Bara with Salar Zarza. The film, which was shot in the Sahara, in Tata, Morocco, was shown in theaters in major Moroccan cities and was extremely well received by audiences.

== Influence ==
Qissi's role as Tong Po in Kickboxer (1989) provided visual inspiration for the Mortal Kombat character Goro.

== Personal life ==
Qissi's brother Abdel is also an actor.

After a long career in Hollywood, Qissi returned to Belgium, where he participated in social projects for disadvantaged youths. In 2002, he returned to Morocco, where he works in Moroccan cinema.

== Filmography ==
Year	Film	Role	Notes
1984	Breakin'	Passerby in First Dance Sequence	Uncredited
1988	Bloodsport	Suan Paredes	
1989	Kickboxer	Tong Po	Credited as Tong Po
1990	Lionheart	Moustafa	
1991	Kickboxer 2	Tong Po	
1991	Bloodmatch	Davey O'Brien	
1993	To the Death	Denard	
1993	Terminator Woman	Alex Gatelee	Also director
2001	Extreme Force	Kong Li	Also director
2001	The Falkland Man	DeFuego	
2014	Bara	Bara / Hamza	Also director
2015	Heart of a Lion		Also director
2016	Kickboxer: Vengeance	Man in Cell	Uncredited
2019	Garra Mortal	Tong Po	
2022	Out for Vengeance	Tarek El-Yuzdi	
2024	The Last Kumite	Wolf	
2025	Run	Abdul	
2026	Order of the Dragon	Commander Rouge	Post-production
