= Josh Becker (filmmaker) =

American filmmaker (1958–2025)

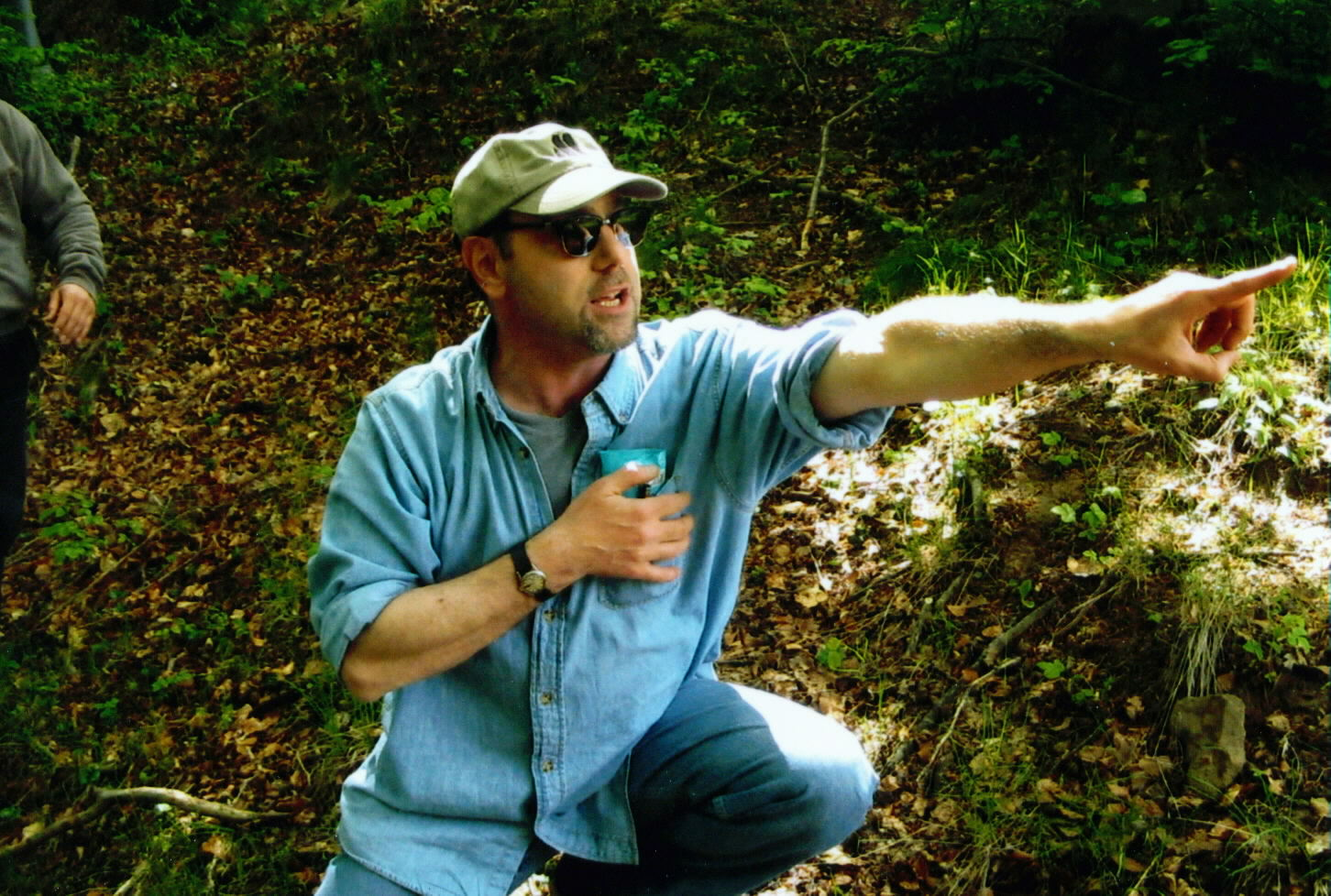
- Becker, during the filming of Alien Apocalypse
- Born: Joshua Matthew Becker; August 17, 1958; Detroit, Michigan, U.S.
- Died: December 5, 2025 (aged 67)
- Occupations: Film and television director and writer
- Years active: 1981–2025
- Website: http://www.beckerfilms.com/

Joshua Matthew Becker (August 17, 1958 – December 5, 2025) was an American film and television writer and director and author whose credits included episodes of Xena: Warrior Princess, as well as collaborations with Bruce Campbell and Sam Raimi.

== Life and career ==
=== Early life and education ===
Josh Becker was born in Detroit, Michigan, on August 17, 1958. He became fascinated with cinema after seeing How the West Was Won at age six. As a teenager, he made several Super-8 short films with Sam Raimi and Bruce Campbell. He dropped out of high-school at age 16 and completed his GED, then attended several colleges (including Michigan State University), but did not complete his studies. At the age of 17, he moved to Los Angeles, where he worked several mid-to-low level jobs while trying to enter the film industry. He also hitchhiked to Alaska during his period (inspired by the writer Jack London), and recounted his adventures in Alaska Journal, and his later memoir, Going Hollywood.

=== Film and television career ===
Becker worked as a production assistant and sound recordist on The Evil Dead (1981), which he later referred to as the most grueling film shoot he'd ever been on. He later made his first feature film, Stryker's War (later retitled Thou Shall Not Kill...Except), at age 25, which co-starred Sam Raimi, after spending several years trying to raise funds for it. Bruce Campbell was originally set to star in the film, and starred in the 45-minute Super-8 demo version of the film, but had to bow out due to Screen Actors Guild union regulations. His second film, Lunatics: A Love Story, was produced and released in 1991, and starred Ted Raimi and Deborah Foreman. He also worked as a production assistant during this period, including on one of Mariah Carey's first music videos.

He later directed episodes of several television shows, including Real Stories of the Highway Patrol. He directed the TV film Hercules in the Maze of the Minotaur, which led to a directing gig on Xena: Warrior Princess that he had for several years. He also directed the black-and-white film Running Time with Bruce Campbell, which was edited to look as if it was filmed in a single continuous shot.

In 1999, Becker wrote, produced, and directed the independent film If I Had a Hammer, about the 1960s folk rock scene. Becker later directed the two Sci-Fi Channel films Alien Apocalypse (based on his screenplay) and Stan Lee's Harpies.

In 2013, Becker produced the YouTube web series Spine Chillers, directing several episodes. In 2018, Becker returned to feature filmmaking with Morning, Noon, and Night In 2020, he followed with another feature, the western Warpath starring Thom Matthews and Ted Raimi.

=== Death ===
Becker died on December 5, 2025, at the age of 67.

== Writing ==
Becker authored The Complete Guide to Low-Budget Feature Filmmaking detailing the ins and outs of independent filmmaking from his own experience. Bruce Campbell penned the introduction.

His second book, Rushes, a collection of essays previously available on his website, was published in 2008.

His third book, Going Hollywood, which details his time in Hollywood upon first arriving in 1976, and his adventures in Alaska, was released in 2010.

In 2014, Becker attempted crowdfunding publishing his series of historical fiction novels. One of them, Mann's Revenge, was published as an e-book on Amazon.

Becker published a number of essays on his website about the film business and film history, as well as a number of film reviews, which are notable for their acidity and brutal honesty. He frequently bemoaned the current state of cinema and Hollywood, which he saw as purely being motivated by money (instead of artistic and creative intentions) and geared towards the lowest common denominator. He was also an avid fan of classic cinema and the Golden Age of Hollywood, and wrote that he considers The Bridge on the River Kwai to be the best film ever made.

He also reviewed old western films for True West Magazine.

=== Essays ===
- Smoking Cigarettes (1996)
- The Need for Structure, Part I (1997)
- The Need for Structure, Part II: We Are Our Own Worst Enemies (1997)
- Reduced Expectations (1997)
- 99-Cent Stores (1998)
- Verisimilitude (1998)
- Genius in Film (1998)
- Truth & Lies (1998)
- Stories & Society ("Pleasantville" and "Enemy of the State") (1998)
- Turner Classic Movies: A Blessing on My House (1998)
- The Need for Structure, Part III: Action Movies (1999)
- Stevie the Cat (1999)
- The Need for Structure, Part IV: The Rejection of Older Forms (2000)
- The Need for Structure, Part V: Irony & Theme (2000)
- America: Land of the Stupid Cowboys (2000)
- Reading Books (2000)
- Monsterization (2000)
- The Intentions of Storytelling (2000)
- My History of Writing Machines (2000)
- A Lesser Form (2001)
- Bailing Out on Los Angeles (2001)
- My Patriotic "Orientation" (2003)
- Religion is Evil (2003)
- The Misuse of Presidential Power (2003)
- Dogma 2006: Facing the Post-Star Wars Era (2005)
- Hollywood Movie Studios (2005)
- Bulgarian Impressions (2006)
- Conservatism (2007)
- "Victory" in Iraq is Pure Garbage (2008)
- Religious Freedom (2010)
- The Making of "Intent" (2007, rev. 2011)

== Selected film and television credits ==
Year	Film	Director	Producer	Writer	Other	Notes
1981	The Evil Dead				Lighting and effects	
1981	Torro! Torro! Torro!	Yes				Short film
1982	Cleveland Smith: Bounty Hunter	Yes		Yes	Cinematographer and editor	Short film
1985	Thou Shalt Not Kill... Except	Yes		Yes	Cinematographer and editor	
1991	Lunatics: A Love Story	Yes		Yes		
1993	Real Stories of the Highway Patrol	Yes				Television series
1994	Hercules in the Maze of the Minotaur	Yes				Television film
1995	Mosquito				Actor	
1996–2001	Xena: Warrior Princess	Yes		Yes		Television series Directed 9 episodes Wrote 2 episodes
1997	Running Time	Yes	Yes	Yes		
1999	If I Had a Hammer	Yes		Yes		
2000	Jack of All Trades	Yes				Television series 2 episodes
2005	Alien Apocalypse	Yes		Yes		Television film
2007	Stan Lee's Harpies	Yes				Television film
2008	Intent	Yes				Unreleased
2013–2014	Spine Chillers	Yes	Yes	Yes		Web series Directed 3 episodes Wrote 3 episodes Actor (1 episode)
2018	Morning, Noon, and Night	Yes	Yes	Yes		
2020	Warpath	Yes	Yes	Yes		

== Bibliography ==
- Josh Becker (February 2006). The Complete Guide to Low-budget Feature Filmmaking. ISBN 0-8095-5690-1.
- Becker, Josh (2008-05-15). Rushes. p. 276.
