= Go Away (film) =

- Promotional release poster
- Directed by: David Kerr
- Written by: David Kerr
- Produced by: David Kerr, Amber Fulcher, Michael McGlynn, Jaime Weisman
- Starring: Thom Mathews; Tuesday Knight; Felissa Rose; Robert Mukes; Michael McGlynn
- Cinematography: Owen D. Young Jr.
- Edited by: David Kerr
- Music by: Adam Robertson
- Production company: Slasher 15 Productions
- Release date: November 30, 2023
- Country: United States
- Language: English

Go Away is a 2023 American horror slasher film written and directed by David Kerr, and starring Thom Mathews, Tuesday Knight, Felissa Rose, and Robert Mukes. The film centers around a family reunion at a remote house in the woods that is interrupted by a group of masked intruders.

Go Away was released in 2023.

== Cast ==
- Christine Oswald as Liz
- Matthew Sharpe as Mark, Liz's boyfriend
- Tuesday Knight as Sherry, Liz's estranged mother
- Thom Mathews as Chuck
- Felissa Rose as Aunt Mary
- L.C. Holt as Deputy Ledbetter
- Justin Marxen as James
- Robert Mukes as Blue
- De’Rome Chretien as Red
- Amber Fulcher as Pink
- Michael McGlynn as Green/Draven
- Joshua Kirpach as Yellow
- Chanda Rawlings as Danielle, Liz's best friend
- Brendan Lynch as Robert, Danielle’s boyfriend
- Emily Zinski as Heather, Liz's sister
- Zachary Thaler as Gary, Emily’s boyfriend

== Production ==
=== Development and financing ===
Go Away was financed in part by two crowdfunding campaigns on the website Indiegogo, which together raised over $50,000.
