= Thom Mathews =

American actor (born 1958)

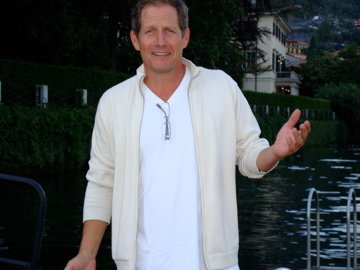
- Mathews at Lake Como, Italy, June 2009
- Born: Thomas Mathews; November 28, 1958 (age 67); Los Angeles, California, U.S.
- Occupation: Actor
- Years active: 1982–present
- Notable work: Friday the 13th
- Spouse: Karla Jensen (m. 2014)
- Children: 3

Thomas Mathews (born November 28, 1958) is an American actor best known for his role as Tommy Jarvis in Friday the 13th Part VI: Jason Lives (1986)—and Freddy Hanscom in The Return of the Living Dead (1985). His other film roles include Dangerously Close (1986), Return of the Living Dead Part II (1988), and Nemesis (1992).

== Career ==
=== Acting and Friday the 13th ===
Thom Mathews began his acting career in the early 1980s as a model and commercial actor, starring in national television commercials for Le Tigre, Sprite and Tostitos. From 1982 to 1984, Mathews guest starred on a string of soap operas including Falcon Crest (1982; 1984), Dynasty (1983) and Paper Dolls (1984). In 1984, Mathews portrayed Erik in the romantic comedy film The Woman in Red although he was uncredited.

Mathews' first major role was Freddy Hanscom in the 1985 cult film The Return of the Living Dead. The following year, Mathews starred in Friday the 13th Part VI: Jason Lives, being the third actor to portray Tommy Jarvis after Corey Feldman and John Shepherd. In 1987, he starred as Francis Kelly in the television film The Dirty Dozen: The Deadly Mission. The same year, Mathews starred in the film Down Twisted and guest starred on the sitcom Mr. President. In 1988, he starred as Joey Hazel in Return of the Living Dead Part II and Charmin' in Alien from L.A.. In 1989, Mathews guest starred on an episode of CBS Summer Playhouse.

In 1990, Mathews portrayed Tim Murphy in the television film Rock Hudson, Sonny Hilderbrand in the television pilot Sporting Chance, and David in the film Midnight Cabaret. The following year, Mathews starred in the films Bloodmatch and Born to Ride and the television short The Letters from Moab. In 1992, he starred in the film Nemesis. In 1994, he portrayed Bill in Kickboxer 4 and Dan Donahue in In the Living Years. The following year, Mathews starred in Heatseeker. The same year, he guest starred on the ER second season episode "And Baby Makes Two". In 1996, Mathews starred in the television films If Looks Could Kill and Raven Hawk.

Mathews reprised the role of Tommy Jarvis twice in 2017, providing his voice and likeness to the video game Friday the 13th: The Game and making a cameo appearance in the unofficial fan film Never Hike Alone and its 2020 prequel, Never Hike in the Snow. He repeated the role of Tommy Jarvis in 2022 in another unofficial fan film Vengeance Part 2: Bloodlines and starred in the sequel Never Hike Alone 2, released in October 2023.

== Personal life ==
On May 10, 2014, Mathews married Karla Jensen in Los Cabos Municipality, Mexico.

Mathews now owns a construction company, Hammer and Trowel. Sharon and Ozzy Osbourne hired his company to remodel their home during the filming of their MTV reality show The Osbournes.

== Filmography ==
Film
Year	Title	Role	Notes
1984	The Woman in Red	Erik	Uncredited
1985	The Return of the Living Dead	Freddy Hanscom	
1986	Dangerously Close	Brian Rigletti	
1986	Friday the 13th Part VI: Jason Lives	Tommy Jarvis	
1987	Down Twisted	Damalas	
1988	Return of the Living Dead Part II	Joey Hazel	
1988	Alien from L.A.	Charmin'	
1990	Midnight Cabaret	David	
1991	Born to Ride	Willis	
1991	Bloodmatch	Brick Bardo	
1992	Nemesis	Marion	
1994	Kickboxer 4: The Aggressor	Bill	
1994	In the Living Years	Dan Donahue	
1995	Heatseeker	Bradford	
1997	Blast	Bill	Uncredited
1997	Mean Guns	Crow	
1997	The Peacemaker	Major Rich Numbers	
1997	Crazy Six	Andrew	
1998	Waiting for Woody	Bike Messenger	Short film
1998	Sorcerers	The Duke	
2001	The Vampire Hunters Club	Henry Pratt	Short film
2009	A Letter to Dad	Dan	
2013	Crystal Lake Memories: The Complete History of Friday the 13th	Himself	Documentary film
2017	Never Hike Alone	Tommy Jarvis	Fan film
2019	Killer Therapy	John Langston	
2020	Never Hike in the Snow	Tommy Jarvis	Fan film
2022	Vengeance Part 2: Bloodlines	Tommy Jarvis	Fan film
2023	Final Summer	Sheriff Palmer	
2023	Never Hike Alone 2	Tommy Jarvis	Fan film
2023	Go Away	Chuck	

Television
Year	Title	Role	Notes
1982–1984	Falcon Crest	Pool Guy #2 / Paramedic #2	2 episodes
1983	Dynasty	Brian	2 episodes
1983	The Yellow Rose	Danny	Episode: "Only the Proud"
1984	Paper Dolls	Lewis Crosby	5 episodes
1987	The Dirty Dozen: The Deadly Mission	Francis Kelly	Television film
1987	Mr. President	Secret Service Agent	Episode: "Private Moments"
1989	CBS Summer Playhouse	Cal	Episode: "The Heat"
1990	Rock Hudson	Tim Murphy	Television film
1990	Sporting Chance	Sonny Hilderbrand	Television pilot
1991	The Letters from Moab	Tom	Television short
1995	ER	Michael Mazovick	Episode: "And Baby Makes Two"
1996	Raven Hawk	Stiles	Television film
1996	If Looks Could Kill	Walter	Television film
2000	Fail Safe	Billy Flynn	Television film

Video Games
Year	Title	Role	Notes
2017	Friday the 13th: The Game	Tommy Jarvis	Voice and likeness
