= Running Time (film) =

1997 American crime thriller film

- DVD cover
- Directed by: Josh Becker
- Screenplay by: Josh Becker; Peter Choi
- Story by: Peter Choi
- Produced by: Josh Becker; Jane Goe
- Starring: Bruce Campbell; Jeremy Roberts; Anita Barone
- Cinematography: Kurt Rauf
- Edited by: Raymond Berthaud; Kaye Davis
- Music by: Joseph LoDuca
- Release date: 1997
- Running time: 70 minutes
- Country: United States
- Language: English

Running Time is a 1997 independent crime thriller film written, produced & directed by Josh Becker. Principal cast members are Bruce Campbell, Jeremy Roberts and Anita Barone.

The movie was filmed in real time similar to Robert Wise's noir boxing film The Set-Up (1949). It also tracks as a continuous take with no cuts.

== Plot ==
A prison inmate (Campbell) receives early release only to immediately rejoin his former criminal comrades in a heist. In the hour or so he rekindles a romance with an old flame (Barone) and realizes the "good ol' days" with his partner in crime (Roberts) just might not have been so good.

== Cast ==
- Bruce Campbell – Carl Matushka
- Jeremy Roberts – Patrick
- Anita Barone – Randi/Janie
- William Stanford Davis – Buzz
- Gordon Jennison Noice – Donny
- Art LaFleur – Warden Emmett E. Walton
- Dana Craig – Mr. Mueller
- Curtis Taylor – Prison guard
- Bridget Hoffman – Receptionist
