= Kickboxer (1989 film) =

Film by David Worth

- Theatrical release poster
- Directed by: Mark DiSalle; David Worth
- Screenplay by: Glenn A. Bruce
- Story by: Mark DiSalle; Jean-Claude Van Damme
- Produced by: Mark DiSalle
- Starring: Jean-Claude Van Damme; Michel Qissi; Dennis Alexio; Dennis Chan
- Cinematography: Jon Kranhouse
- Edited by: Wayne Wahrman
- Music by: Paul Hertzog
- Production company: Kings Road Entertainment
- Distributed by: The Cannon Group
- Release date: September 8, 1989
- Running time: 103 minutes
- Country: United States
- Language: English
- Budget: $2.7 million
- Box office: $50 million

Kickboxer is a 1989 American martial arts film directed by Mark DiSalle and David Worth and starring Jean-Claude Van Damme. Former world kickboxing champion Dennis Alexio is also featured. The plot revolves around Kurt Sloane (Van Damme) seeking revenge on the fearsome kickboxing champion Tong Po (Michel Qissi) who paralyzed his brother Eric Sloane (Dennis Alexio). The film is regarded as the first movie to bring Muay Thai (Thai kickboxing) to a global audience.

Produced by Kings Road Entertainment and released by The Cannon Group, Inc. on September 8, 1989, it grossed $50 million on a budget of $2.7 million. It spawned several sequels.

== Plot ==
Kurt is the younger brother and cornerman of Eric "The Eliminator" Sloane, the heavyweight kickboxing world champion. After another successful title defense, Eric is enticed by the media to compete in Thailand, where kickboxing was started, to further establish his legacy. As a result, Eric and Kurt travel to Bangkok to fight Tong "The Tiger" Po, Thailand's undefeated top fighter. Eric is supremely confident, but Kurt becomes apprehensive after witnessing Tong Po kicking a concrete pillar in preparation for the fight. He begs Eric not to fight, but Eric dismisses any concerns.

Eric gets beaten badly until Kurt throws in the towel, but Tong Po kicks the towel out of the ring and delivers a vicious elbow strike to Eric's back, immobilizing him. Kurt leaves with his brother on a stretcher, but the fight officials leave them on the street. Winston Taylor, a retired United States Army Special Forces soldier and Vietnam War veteran, agrees to help the pair by driving them to the hospital. As a result of Tong Po's brutal attack, Eric is paralyzed from the waist down and will never be able to walk again.

An enraged Kurt vows to avenge his brother. He searches for a trainer to teach him Muay Thai, but is mocked and laughed out of the local gym by local fighters. Eventually, Taylor tells him about Xian Chow, a famous Muay Thai Kru. Although reluctant at first, Xian agrees to train Kurt after Kurt prevents goons sent by Freddy Li - a higher up in a ruthless racketeering organization and Tong Po's manager - from stealing money from Xian's niece, Mylee. As Kurt progresses in his training, Xian convinces Freddy Li to arrange a preliminary match between Kurt and another fighter from Freddy Li's stable. Kurt is victorious as the crowd chants "Nack Suk Cao" ("The White Warrior"), and earns a match against Tong Po. Kurt learns that he and Tong Po will fight in the "ancient way": both fighters wrap their hands in hemp rope, which is then coated in resin, and dipped in broken glass to make them deadly weapons.

Freddy Li arranges to have the fight fixed, and borrows $1 million from the Thai crime syndicate's boss Tao Liu in order to bet on Tong Po. Prior to the match, Mylee is beaten and raped by Tong Po, while Eric is kidnapped so that Freddy Li can blackmail Kurt into losing the fight. Mylee begs Taylor to help find Eric, but he is reluctant to cross Freddy Li.

To save his brother's life, Kurt is instructed by Freddy Li to go the distance with Tong Po before losing the match. While Tong Po punishes Kurt, Xian manages to locate Eric and rescue him with Taylor's help. Before the final round begins, Eric arrives with Xian and Taylor. With his brother now out of danger, and angered by Tong Po's taunts over Mylee's rape, Kurt has Mylee cut his hand wraps and defeats Tong Po. After winning the match, he knocks out Freddy Li as well and celebrates with the others.

== Cast ==
- Jean-Claude Van Damme as Kurt "The White Warrior" Sloane
- Dennis Alexio as Eric "The Eliminator" Sloane
- Dennis Chan as Xian Chow, Muay Thai Kru
- Michel Qissi as Tong "The Tiger" Po (credited as "Tong Po")
- Ka Ting Lee as Freddy Li
- Rochelle Ashana as Mylee
- Haskell Anderson as Winston Taylor
- Richard Foo as Tao Liu
- Wong Wing Shun as Lo

== Production ==
The movie was primarily filmed in Thailand, specifically in Bangkok and the ancient city of Ayutthaya. Key scenes, such as the intense "Stone City" training sequences for the protagonist Kurt Sloane, were shot at the ancient temple ruins of Wat Mahathat in Ayutthaya Historical Park. The majority of the movie was shot in Hong Kong, with Master Xian's jungle house being built in Sai Kung, at Shing Fung studios.

Moroccan actor Michel Qissi, wore extensive facial makeup to transform into his role of the Thai champion Tong Po. He stated in an interview that those who had seen him fight before could only recognize him by his style of movement while wearing the makeup.

== Music ==
A soundtrack containing songs from the film was released featuring songs from soundtrack specialist Stan Bush. The score for the film was composed by Paul Hertzog. The full score was remastered and released in 2006 by Perseverance Records in limited quantity. The 2006 official score release does not include a previously released version of the score track titled "Buddha's Eagle" which was released on the Best of Van Damme Volume 2 Compilation CD.

An expanded version of the 2006 album was released by Perseverance Records in July 2014. This album contained the remastered original 22 tracks plus 9 vocal performances that previously had only been available in Germany.

== Reception ==
=== Box office ===
Kickboxer grossed $14,697,005 in the United States. Cannon deliberately released it on the traditionally slow weekend after Labor Day when no studio releases, and thus limited competition; it opened on 973 screens and grossed $4.1 million, making it the third most popular film in the country. A few years later its gross was estimated at $50 million.

=== Critical response ===
Chris Willman of the Los Angeles Times called the film "egregiously dull" and a contender for one of "the dumbest action pictures of the year", citing its "jarring shifts in tone, insurmountable plot implausibilities, rampant racial stereotyping, superfluous nudity and inhuman amounts of comically exaggerated violence". Willman also questioned the manner in which characters seem to recover from serious injuries and major trauma.

Chris Hicks of the Deseret News criticized the film as a ripoff of The Karate Kid, with added elements from other films such as Rocky and Rambo. In addition to stating that the ending was predictable, Hicks also dismissed Van Damme as "little more than a low-budget Arnold Schwarzenegger wannabee" whose attempts at acting were in vain.

On Rotten Tomatoes the film has an approval rating of 36% based on reviews from 11 critics. On Metacritic the film has a score of 33% based on reviews from 4 critics. /Film identified it as one of the most influential martial arts films of all time.

== Home media ==
Kickboxer was first released on VHS by HBO Video in 1990. DVD was released by HBO Home Video in the United States on June 8, 1999. The DVD was released by Prism Leisure Corporation in the United Kingdom on January 6, 2003.

== Legacy ==
The film is regarded as the first movie to bring Muay Thai to a global audience. Michel Qissi’s role as Tong Po provided visual inspiration for the Mortal Kombat character Goro.

== Sequels ==
The film spawned several sequels. Despite Van Damme not returning, the film series between parts two and four continues the ongoing battles between the Sloane family (although now spelled Sloan) - expanded to include third brother David Sloan(e), played by Sasha Mitchell - and Tong Po. Michel Qissi returned as Tong Po for Kickboxer 2: The Road Back and appears in a flashback scene shown at the beginning of Kickboxer 4: The Aggressor. This scene looks to be a seemingly deleted scene from Kickboxer 2 that never made the final cut. Tong Po was played by Kamel Krifa in Kickboxer 4. Kickboxer 5: The Redemption was a stand-alone story with new characters and has a small connection to the previous films.

Kickboxer was remade as Kickboxer: Vengeance, as a reboot of the series which was released on September 2, 2016.
