= List of mixed martial arts films =

With the growing worldwide popularity of mixed martial arts (MMA) as an athletic sport, numerous MMA films have come to theaters, television, and DVDs.

The following is a list of live action MMA films where at least one character or martial artist fights in the MMA style or MMA is the central theme. For example, plot of the film may deal with cage fighting, a mixed martial arts competition, or martial artists fighting in different styles.

== Early films (pre-2000) ==
Films listed in order by year of release

- Enter the Dragon (1973) - Bruce Lee, John Saxon, Jim Kelly, Shih Kien, Ahna Capri, Bob Wall, Angela Mao Ying, Betty Chung, Sammo Hung, Jackie Chan, Yuen Biao
- Game of Death (1978) - Bruce Lee, Dan Inosanto, Kareem Abdul-Jabbar, Kim Tai-jong, Gig Young, Dean Jagger, Colleen Camp, Bob Wall, Yuen Biao, Sammo Hung
- Last Man Standing (1988) - William Sanderson, Michael Copeman
- Bloodsport (1988) - Jean-Claude Van Damme, Bolo Yeung, Forest Whitaker, Donald Gibb
- Ring of Fire II: Blood and Steel (1993) - Don "The Dragon" Wilson, Ron Yuan, Maria Ford, Shari Shattuck, Vince Murdocco
- Bloodsport II: The Next Kumite (1996) - Daniel Bernhardt, John Rhys-Davies, Pat Morita, James Hong, Gerald Okamura
- Bloodsport III (1997) - Daniel Bernhardt, John Rhys-Davies, Pat Morita, Donald Gibb, Philip Tan
- Bloodsport 4: The Dark Kumite (1999) - Daniel Bernhardt, Ivan Ivanov, Michael Krawk
- Lionheart (1990) - Jean-Claude Van Damme, Brian Thompson, Billy Blanks
- Street Fighter (1994) - Jean-Claude Van Damme, Raúl Juliá, Kylie Minogue, Damian Chapa
- WMAC Masters (1995) (TV series) - Shannon Lee, Herb Perez, Hakim Alston, Ho-Sung Pak, Hoyoung Pak, Jamie Webster, Chris Casamassa, Johnny Lee Smith, Larry Lam
- Mortal Kombat (1995) - Christopher Lambert, Robin Shou, Linden Ashby, Bridgette Wilson, Chris Casamassa, Talisa Soto, Cary-Hiroyuki Tagawa, Trevor Goddard
- The Quest (1996) - Jean-Claude Van Damme, Roger Moore, Louis Mandylor, James Remar
- Mortal Kombat Annihilation (1997) - Robin Shou, Talisa Soto, Brian Thompson, James Remar, Sandra Hess, Chris Conrad, Litefoot, Lynn "Red" Williams
- Mortal Kombat: Konquest (1998) (TV series) - Daniel Bernhardt, Paolo Montalban, Tracey Douglas, Kristanna Loken, Jefferey Meek, Bruce Locke
- Champions (1998) - Louis Mandylor, Danny Trejo, Ken Shamrock
- Choke (1999) (documentary) - Rickson Gracie, Royler Gracie
- Fight Club (1999) - Brad Pitt, Edward Norton, Helena Bonham Carter, Meat Loaf

== American films ==
Films listed in alphabetical order

- Arena (2011) - Kellan Lutz, Samuel L. Jackson, Daniel Dae Kim, Johnny Messner, Derek Mears, Katia Winter, Nina Dobrev
- Bare Knuckles (2010) (DVD) - Martin Kove, Jeanette Roxborough, Louis Mandylor, Chris Mulkey
- Beatdown (2010) (video/DVD) - Rudy Youngblood, Eric Balfour, Danny Trejo, Michael Bisping, Heath Herring, Bobby Lashley, Mike Swick
- Beyond the Ring (2008) - André Lima, Martin Kove, Gary Busey, Justice Smith
- Blizhiny Boy: The Ultimate Fighter (2007) (also released in Russia) - Martin Kove, Bolo Yeung, Gary Busey, Cung Le, David Carradine, Eric Roberts
- Blood and Bone (2008) - Michael Jai White, Julian Sands, Kevin "Kimbo Slice" Ferguson, Eamonn Walker, Gina Carano, Jesse Smith, Jr.
- Cage Fighter (2011) (documentary) - Eric Schambari, Urijah Faber, Jens Pulver, Brian Bowles, Charlie Valencia, Doug Marshall, Alex Karalexis, Jeff Curran, Paulo Filho
- Caged In (2011)
- Cagefighter: Worlds Collide (2020; British–American co-production) — Alex Montagnani, Jonathan Good, Gina Gershon, Jay Reso, Chuck Liddell, Luke Rockhold, Elijah Baker
- Circle of Pain (2010) (video/DVD) - Dean Cain, Bai Ling, Roger Huerta, Kevin "Kimbo Slice" Ferguson, Heath Herring, Frank Mir, Tony Schiena
- Cradle 2 the Grave (2003) - Jet Li, DMX, Kelly Hu, Mark Dacascos, Tito Ortiz, Chuck Liddell, Randy Couture
- Damage (2009)- "Stone Cold" Steve Austin, Walter Gooins, Laura Vandervoort
- Death Warrior (2008) - Héctor Echavarría, Nick Nolte, Garret Soto, George St-Pierre, Anderson Silva, Quinton "Rampage" Jackson, Jesse Smith, Jr.
- DOA: Dead or Alive (2006) - Jaime Pressly, Devon Aoki, Eric Roberts, Kane Kosugi, Kevin Nash
- Fighting (2009) - Channing Tatum, Terrence Howard, Cung Le
- The Hammer (2010) - Russell Harvard, Raymond J. Barry, Rich Franklin, Matt Hamill (stunts)
- Haywire (2011) - Gina Carano, Ewan McGregor, Channing Tatum, Michael Angarano, Antonio Banderas, Michael Douglas
- Hell's Chain (2009) - Héctor Echavarría, Heath Herring, Quinton "Rampage" Jackson, Frank Mir, Antônio Rodrigo Nogueira, Georges St-Pierre, Anderson Silva
- Here Comes the Boom (2012) - Kevin James, Henry Winkler, Salma Hayek
- Honor (2006) - Jason Barry, Russell Wong, Roddy Piper, Don Frye, Malaipet, Rener Gracie, Rorion Gracie
- Locked Down (2010) - Vinnie Jones, Tony Schiena, Bai Ling, Kevin "Kimbo Slice" Ferguson, Rashad Evans, Cheick Kongo, Forrest Griffin
- Maximum Cage Fighting (2006) (video-DVD) - André Lima, Jun Chong, Jason Field, Renzo Gracie, Oliva Briggs
- Never Back Down (2008) - Sean Faris, Cam Gigandet, Djimon Hounsou
- Never Back Down 2 (2011) (video/DVD) - Michael Jai White, Evan Peters, Alex Meraz, Dean Geyer, Todd Duffee
- Never Submit (2009) (also released in Canada) - Corey Sevier, Ken Shamrock, Nate Quarry, Mike Swick
- Never Surrender (2009) - Héctor Echavarría, B.J. Penn, George St-Pierre, Anderson Silva
- New York Mixed Martial Arts (2011) (documentary) - Josh Barnett, Bas Rutten, Michael Straka, Dana White
- No Rules (2005) - Gary Busey, Randy Couture, Don Frye, Jessie Avila
- Once I Was a Champion (2011) (documentary) - Evan Tanner, Randy Couture, Rich Franklin, Forrest Griffin, Bas Rutten, Chael Sonnen, Dana White
- The Philly Kid (2012) - Wes Chatham, Devon Sawa, Sarah Butler, Neal McDonough, Michael Jai White, Rich Clementi
- The Red Canvas (2008) Ernie Reyes, Sr., Ernie Reyes, Jr., Lee Reyes, Frank Shamrock, Shonie Carter, Chris Casamassa
- Redbelt (2008) - Chiwetel Ejiofor, Alice Braga, Jose Pablo Cantillo, Randy Couture
- Redemption (2011) - Louis Gossett Jr., Omari Hardwick, Tzi Ma, B.J. Penn, Frank Mir, Stephan Bonnar, Big John McCarthy
- Ring of Death (2008) (TV movie) - Johnny Messner, Stacy Keach
- Street Warrior (2008) (TV movie) - Max Martini, Nick Chinlund, Max Perlich, Danny Arroyo
- Supreme Champion (2010) (DVD) - Daniel Berhardt, Stephan Bonnar, Leila Arcieri
- Tekken (2010) - Jon Foo, Kelly Overton, Cung Le, Ian Anthony Dale, Luke Gross, Roger Huerta
- Ten Dead Men (2007) (also released in UK) - Brendan Carr, Terry Stone, Kimo Leopoldo, Dave Legeno
- Ultimate Champions (2008) - Daniel Bernhardt, Stephan Bonnar, Neal "Xingu" Rodil
- Undisputed II: Last Man Standing (2006) - Michael Jai White, Scott Adkins, Ben Cross
- Undisputed III: Redemption (aka Undisputed 3) (2009) - Scott Adkins, Mykel Shannon Jenkins, Ilram Choi
- Boyka: Undisputed (2016)
- Unleashed (2005) (also released in France and UK as Danny the Dog) - Jet Li, Morgan Freeman, Bob Hoskins
- Unrivaled (2010) - Héctor Echavarría, Rashad Evans, Forrest Griffin, Heath Herring, Keith Jardine, Lyoto Machida
- Warrior (2011) - Tom Hardy, Nick Nolte, Joel Edgerton, Jake McLaughlin, Rich Clementi

== Other films ==
- Black Salt (2010) (Anime) (Turkey)
- Flash Point (2007) (aka City Without Mercy) (Hong Kong) - Donnie Yen, Collin Chou, Louis Koo, Ray Lui, Fan Bingbing and Xing Yu
- The Kumite (2003) (aka Star Runner/Sin nin a Fu) (Hong Kong/South Korea) - Vanness Wu, Kim Hyun-joo, Andy On, Max Mok, Wong Yau-Nam and Gordon Liu
- Nagurimono: The Fighter (2005) (Japan) - Kazushi Sakuraba, Hiroshi Tamaki, Takanri Jinnai, Quinton "Rampage" Jackson, Don Frye and Wanderlei Silva
- The Tournament (2008) (UK) - Scott Adkins, Kelly Hu, Ving Rhames, Robert Carlyle, Ian Somerhalder, Liam Cunningham and Sébastien Foucan
- Rust and Bone (2012) (France/Belgium) - Matthias Schoenaerts, Marion Cotillard, Corinne Masiero, Bouli Lanners and Céline Sallette
- Brothers (2015) (India) - Akshay Kumar, Siddharth Malhotra, Jackie Shroff, Jacqueline Fernandez, Shefali Shah, Ashutosh Rana, Kiran Kumar, Kulbhushan Kharbanda, Conan Stevens and Shad Gaspard
- Mais Forte que o Mundo (2016) (Brazil) - José Loreto, Cleo Pires, Rômulo Arantes Neto, Milhem Cortaz, Jackson Antunes, Claudia Ohana, Paloma Bernardi and Rafinha Bastos
- Never Say Never (2023) (China) - Wang Baoqiang

== See also ==
- List of martial arts films
- List of ninja films
- Samurai cinema
