= True Vengeance =

1997 film by David Worth

- U.S. release art
- Directed by: David Worth
- Written by: Kurt Johnstad
- Produced by: Alan Mehrez; Heidi Eckes Chantre
- Starring: Daniel Bernhardt; Miles O'Keeffe; Beverly Johnson; George Cheung
- Cinematography: David Worth
- Edited by: Ron Cabreros
- Music by: Stephen Edwards
- Production company: FM Entertainment
- Distributed by: FM Home Video (U.S.)
- Release date: February 14, 1997
- Running time: 90 mins
- Country: United States
- Language: English

True Vengeance is a 1997 American action film directed by David Worth, starring Daniel Bernhardt, Miles O'Keeffe, Beverly Johnson and George Cheung. Bernhardt stars as a former Navy SEAL and Yakuza henchman who must twice face his past when his old clan, looking to silence him, hires his former military squadmate (O'Keeffe), with whom he had a falling out, to take him down.

== Plot ==
In 1985, U.S. Navy SEAL Allen Griffin and his partner are dispatched to Colombia to eliminate a local kingpin. When Griffin notices that the criminal is accompanied by his wife and two children, he calls off the killing, but his colleague refuses and murders the entire family. Griffin shoots him in an attempt to stop the massacre, and leaves him for dead as he retreats under the Colombians' return fire.

In present-day U.S., Griffin is a single father raising his daughter Emily in the absence of her deceased mother Yoshiko, a Japanese national for whom he had left the military, becoming a Yakuza enforcer for a time. After her death, he quit his life of crime, and now works at a boat supply warehouse under an assumed name. However, his former boss Hideko Minushoto tracks him down and demands one final favor. When he is turned down, Minushoto has Emily abducted and kept in captivity with a limited supply of oxygen, timed to expire after 24 hours. To see her again, Griffin must assassinate Scott Denton, CEO of a company named Virtual Memory Technology (VMT), which the Yakuza covet.

Griffin executes the contract but Oska, the overseer assigned by Minushoto, attempts to get rid of him shortly after. Griffin instead kills Oska, while secret cameras installed by the worried CEO capture the struggle. When the existence of the tape leaks, Minushuto fears that it could tip off the police to the involvement of his family. He sends a new batch of men to rob the tape from Bill Emory, the detective in charge of the case, and to terminate Griffin for good. When the latter fails, he resolves to hire a contract killer from outside his clan, simply identified as The Specialist. That man turns out to be Griffin's former partner from the botched Colombian mission, whose desire for vengeance may also have something to do with his wife's death. Emory and a Naval Intelligence officer named Kada Wilson try to stand between the two men.

== Cast ==
- Daniel Bernhardt as Allen Griffin
- Miles O'Keeffe as The Specialist
- Beverly Johnson as Lt. Kada Wilson
- George Cheung as Hideko Minushoto
- Jonathan Lutz as Detective Emory
- Roger Yuan as Takura (as Tzi-Chun Yuan)
- Tessa Sugay as Emily Griffin
- Leo Lee as Oska
- Keo Woolford as Adachi
- Harrison Young as Sam Brown
- Tony Goodstone as Capt. Larson
- Yasuke Todo as Sakoto

== Production ==
The film had the working title of Truth or Consequences. It was screenwriter Kurt Johnstad's first produced script. Leading man Daniel Bernhardt and his favorite crew, consisting of stunt people Chad Stahelski, Philip Tan, Brad Martin and Tim Rigby (who was his double on the shoot), all returned from previous installments of the Bloodsport franchise. This was intended as their broad tribute to Hong Kong action cinema, and features several flourishes identified with the genre. The same people would be associated with the 87eleven action team in later years, with Johnstad penning 2017's Atomic Blonde.

Worth was introduced to the project by line producer John Broderick, for whom he done some second unit work in the 1980s. The film was produced by siblings Alan and Diane Mehrez, who had also made Bernhardt's Bloodsport films, and came from a privileged background. Although Worth found Diane to be reasonably knowledgeable about film production, the same could not be said about Alan. The film was shot in 24 days. The modest schedule and stylish choreographies resulted in two days—both during the filming of the Jade Gate club gunfight—requiring more than 100 camera setups each, which was a new record for the already expeditious Worth. The director covered the action with three cameras shooting at 24, 48 and 96 frames per second, which was his go-to method. However, he also relied heavily on a Steadicam, which was used to a greater extent than on any of his previous features.

== Release ==
In the U.S., FM Entertainment released the film on VHS on December 30, 1997, via their own FM Home Video label. The film was released slightly earlier in Canada, where it arrived on October 28 courtesy of CFP Video. In the U.K., the film was released in early September 1998 by Third Millenium Distribution. Unlike the U.S. version, the Canadian and U.K. releases retained much of the preliminary artwork created for the film. Producer Alan Mehrez's biography mentions that True Vengeance was released as a cable premiere, although no broadcast dates could be found prior to its video release in North America.

== Reception ==
Writing for the Knight Ridder family of newspapers, Randy Myers was negative, writing that although some of the featured kickboxing was good, the film was a "brain-dead action flick" and suffered from bad acting, particularly from former model Beverly Johnson, whom he did not buy as a detective. Author "Outlaw" Vern commended the film's action, saying: "It's elaborate and exaggerated in a particular way you don’t tend to see in American productions besides Hard Target. I love it." However, he, too, assessed that "the dialogue and its delivery can be too stiff to make the cliches go down without a laugh." Jay Bobbin of Tribune Media Services rated the film a two on a scale of one to four. VideoHound's Golden Movie Retriever rated the film a two on a scale of zero to four. AllMovie rated it a two on a scale of half a star to five stars.

== Soundtrack ==
The film's original score was composed and produced by Stephen Edwards, who also returned from Bloodsport II and III. Some of these cues were featured on a 1998 promotional CD compilation of Edward's work released by his talent agency SMC, and simply titled Film Music.
