= Lady Bloodfight =

2016 American-Hong Kong film by Chris Nahon

- Promotional release poster
- Directed by: Chris Nahon
- Written by: Bey Logan; Judd Bloch
- Starring: Amy Johnston; Muriel Hofmann; Jenny Wu; Kathy Wu; Jet Tranter; Mayling Ng
- Cinematography: Michel Abramowicz
- Edited by: Chris Nahon; Frédéric Thoraval
- Music by: Mark Kilian
- Production companies: Voltage Pictures; B&E Productions
- Distributed by: Vertical Entertainment
- Release date: 5 May 2017 (United States)
- Running time: 102 minutes
- Countries: United States; Hong Kong
- Languages: English; Cantonese

Lady Bloodfight is a 2016 martial arts film directed by Chris Nahon and starring stuntwoman Amy Johnston as an American fighter who travels to Hong Kong to participate in an all-woman Kumite. A standalone sequel to Bloodsport 4: The Dark Kumite (1999), it is the fifth installment overall in the Bloodsport film series.

== Plot ==
When Jane Jones, a beautiful but troubled American backpacking her way through Hong Kong, successfully fends off three thugs trying to rob her, it draws the attention of Shu, a female fighting champion. Shu recruits and trains Jane to fight in the vicious, all-female underground martial arts tournament known as The Kumite. After months of rigorous training, Jane is ready to face off against her killer rivals, including the apprentice of Shu’s nemesis, a Shaolin master. As other nefarious forces emerge from the shadows, Jane’s journey through The Kumite turns deadly as she risks everything to become the best female fighter in the world.

== Cast ==
- Amy Johnston as Jane Jones
- Muriel Hofmann as Shu
- Jenny Wu as Ling Chow
- Kathy Wu as Wai
- Jet Tranter as Cassidy
- Mayling Ng as Svietta Chekhov
- Sunny Coelst as Jaa
- Rosemary Vandebrouck as Yara
- Lisa Cheng as Lam
- Chalinene Bassinah as Alia
- Lauren Rhoden as Van
- Lisa Henderson as Natalya
- Isa Sofa Chan Kwan Nga as Kim
- Nathalie Ng as Aung
- Happy Ma as Kazumi
- Feng Xiao Xia as Wong
- Wing-Hin Ho as Chow
- Mon Choi as Lau
- Kirt Kishita as Mr. Sang
- Joe Fiorello as Gene
- Cecilia Reynal as Cooker
- Ines Laimins as Mrs. Jones
- Wong Sai Lam as Chubby Girl

== Reception ==
=== Critical response ===
On Rotten Tomatoes the film has a score of 40% based on reviews from 5 critics.

Frank Scheck of The Hollywood Reporter noted that the director "keeps the action suitably fast and furious, even if he overly panders to male viewers" by focusing on the often scantily-clad actresses.
