= Erik Paulson =

American martial artist

- Born: June 28, 1966 (age 60); Minnesota, U.S
- Height: 5 ft 11 in (180 cm)
- Weight: 185 lb (84 kg; 13 st 3 lb)
- Division: Middleweight, Light heavyweight
- Style: Shootfighting, Taekwondo, Kung Fu, Silat, Judo, Muay Thai, Catch Wrestling, Brazilian Jiu Jitsu, Jeet Kune Do, Boxing
- Teachers: Yorinaga Nakamura, Rigan Machado, Billy Robinson, Rickson Gracie, Dan Inosanto, Tim Tackett, Ajarn Chai Sirisute, Rob Kaman
- Rank: A-Class Shootist; Black belt in Tae Kwon Do; Black belt in Judo; 7th degree coral belt in Brazilian Jiu-Jitsu under Rigan Machado
- Years active: 1993–2007

Mixed martial arts record
- Total: 17
- Wins: 11
- By knockout: 2
- By submission: 8
- By decision: 1
- Losses: 4
- By knockout: 2
- By submission: 1
- By decision: 1
- Draws: 2

Other information
- Notable students: Sean Sherk, Ken Shamrock, Josh Barnett, Brock Lesnar, Cub Swanson, Kade Ruotolo, Tye Ruotolo
- Website: http://www.erikpaulson.com
- Mixed martial arts record from Sherdog

Erik Paulson (born June 28, 1966) is an American mixed martial artist. He is the first American to win the World Light Heavyweight Shooto Championship in Japan.

== Biography ==
Erik started his career in martial arts starting with Judo at age of eight. He later took up Taekwondo, Boxing, Aikido, Wrestling, and Jujutsu. Many years after, he moved to California and became a student under Dan Inosanto, Gene Lebell, and Benny Urquidez, learning styles like Karate, Jeet Kune Do, Savate, Kali, Kung Fu, Sambo, Muay Thai, Chin Na, Dumog, Panantukan, and Silat. In 1988, however, Paulson returned to explore grappling when he started Brazilian Jiu-Jitsu under Rorion, Royce and Rickson Gracie in his garage. Upon returning to Inosanto's academy, he met Yorinaga Nakamura, who taught him Shoot Wrestling. Paulson also trained extensively in Catch Wrestling under Billy Robinson. Paulson got hooked with the style, and through Nakamura he got in touch with Satoru Sayama in order to fight in Shooto. In 1993, Erik had his first fight there, submitting Kazuhiro Kusayanagi. He also asked to compete in Ultimate Fighting Championship, but the Gracies refused as Royce was already going to compete there, so Paulson ended up cornering him instead.

Later, in 1995, Paulson took part in an MMA tournament similar to UFC, World Combat Championships, which divided its participants in "strikers" and "grapplers" in order to pit them against each other in the finals. Again, a Gracie participated in the event, Renzo, but this time Paulson got the green light to take part in the tournament. Unfortunately, Paulson was put into the striker block, in which rules prohibited submission finishes, and it took away Erik's best field. Moreover, his long hair played against him, as he couldn't cut it due to his role as a film stuntman. His first match, against Muay Thai exponent Sean McCully, evidenced both disadvantages, with Paulson having to endure hair pulling and a significant punishment in order to finish him by ground and pound. At the second round, he faced Kickboxing champion James Warring, heavier and better rested, and this time Paulson's hair weakness took dramatic proportions; Warring grabbed the cage in order to avoid being taken down and literally dragged Paulson around the cage by the hair, making his corner throw the towel. After returning to the Gracie academy, Rickson expelled him without explanation and forbade him to train Brazilian Jiu-Jitsu again, but Paulson simply moved to train it with the Machado brothers.

Paulson still competed in Shooto, being sent as a representative to the Vale Tudo Japan event, where he was submitted in 0:41 by Canadian grappler Carlos Newton. He retired shortly after, focusing in teaching as opposed to fighting, though he came out of retirement in October 2007 to headline the first HDNET MMA fight card. Paulson took on Jeff Ford in the main event of the night. Paulson made quick work of Ford, winning by spinning armbar in the opening minutes of the first round.

Erik is the founder of Combat Submission Wrestling, and STX Kickboxing. He runs the CSW Training Center in Fullerton, California, where he trains MMA fighters such as Josh Barnett, Ken Shamrock, Renato Sobral, Cub Swanson, and James Wilks. He is closely affiliated with Sean Sherk and Brock Lesnar of the Minnesota Martial Arts Academy. As well, Paulson was the striking coach for Team Lesnar on The Ultimate Fighter: Season 13, and he is the coauthor of a book along with American Combat Association president Matthew Granahan and JD Dwyer on the History of American Submission Wrestling. He also has a younger brother, Leif Paulson, who is an up-and-coming grappler in his own right.

He wrestled for Inoki Genome Federation in 2008.

Erik played Kumite fighter Stellio in Bloodsport III, where his character faced Alex Cardo played by Daniel Bernhardt. He trained Djimon Hounsou in Shoot Wrestling for his role of Mixed Martial Arts instructor Jean Roqua in the 2008 action drama Never Back Down.

== Championships and accomplishments ==
- Shooto
  - Shooto Light Heavyweight Championship

== Mixed martial arts record ==
Professional record breakdown
17 matches	11 wins	4 losses
By knockout	2	2
By submission	8	1
By decision	1	1
Draws	2	

Res.	Record	Opponent	Method	Event	Date	Round	Time	Location	Notes
Win	11–4–2	Jeff Ford	Submission (armbar)	HDNF 1: HD Net Fights	October 13, 2007	1	1:44	Dallas, Texas, United States	
Win	10–4–2	Ronald Jhun	Decision (unanimous)	SB 17: SuperBrawl 17	April 15, 2000	3	5:00	Honolulu, Hawaii, United States	Welterweight bout.
Win	9–4–2	Masanori Suda	TKO (punches)	Shooto: Las Grandes Viajes 5	August 29, 1998	3	4:48	Tokyo, Japan	Middleweight bout.
Loss	8–4–2	Carlos Newton	Submission (armbar)	VTJ 1997: Vale Tudo Japan 1997	November 29, 1997	1	0:41	Urayasu, Japan	
Loss	8–3–3	Paul Jones	Decision (majority)	Shooto: Reconquista 3	August 27, 1997	3	5:00	Tokyo, Japan	
Draw	8–2–2	Paul Jones	Draw	EF 4: Extreme Fighting 4	March 28, 1997	3	5:00	Des Moines, Iowa, United States	
Win	8–2–1	Stuart Harrison	Submission (armbar)	Shooto: Reconquista 1	January 18, 1997	2	2:28	Tokyo, Japan	Defended the Shooto Welterweight Championship.
Loss	7–2–1	Matt Hume	TKO (cut)	EF 3: Extreme Fighting 3	October 18, 1996	3	0:44	Tulsa, Oklahoma, United States	Light Heavyweight debut.
Win	7–1–1	Kenji Kawaguchi	Submission (toe hold)	Shooto: Vale Tudo Junction 3	May 7, 1996	3	1:23	Tokyo, Japan	Won the Shooto Welterweight Championship.
Win	6–1–1	Todd Bjornethun	Submission (guillotine choke)	Shooto: Vale Tudo Junction 1	January 20, 1996	2	0:26	Tokyo, Japan	Middleweight bout.
Loss	5–1–1	James Warring	TKO (corner stoppage)	WCC 1: First Strike	October 17, 1995	1	16:08	Charlotte, North Carolina, United States	Heavyweight bout.
Win	5–0–1	Sean McCully	TKO (submission to strikes)	WCC 1: First Strike	October 17, 1995	1	5:17	Charlotte, North Carolina, United States	Heavyweight bout.
Win	4–0–1	Yasunori Okuda	Technical submission (keylock)	Shooto: Vale Tudo Perception	September 26, 1995	1	0:44	Tokyo, Japan	
Win	3–0–1	Ben Spijkers	Submission (guillotine choke)	Shooto: Complete Vale Tudo Access	July 29, 1995	5	0:38	Saitama, Japan	
Win	2–0–1	Kenji Kawaguchi	Technical submission (armbar)	Shooto: Vale Tudo Access 2	November 7, 1994	2	1:03	Tokyo, Japan	Welterweight debut.
Draw	1–0–1	Naoki Sakurada	Draw	Shooto: Shooto	November 25, 1993	5	3:00	Tokyo, Japan	
Win	1–0	Kazuhiro Kusayanagi	Submission (triangle choke)	Shooto: Shooto	June 24, 1993	3	1:46	Tokyo, Japan	

== Submission grappling record ==
Result	Opponent	Method	Event	Date	Round	Time	Notes
Loss	(Brazil) Xande Ribeiro	Points	ADCC 2003 –99 kg	2003			

== See also ==
- List of Shooto Champions
