= Kelleher International =

American professional matchmaking service

- Company type: Privately held
- Industry: Matchmaking
- Founded: San Francisco, California (1986)
- Founder: Jill Kelleher
- Headquarters: Corte Madera, California
- Area served: Worldwide
- Key people: Jill Kelleher, founder; Amber Kelleher-Andrews, CEO
- Services: Matchmaking
- Number of employees: 50 (2014)
- Website: kelleher-international.com

Kelleher International is a professional matchmaking service that caters to high-net-worth individuals and celebrities. It was founded in 1986 and is headquartered in Corte Madera, California. Amber Kelleher-Andrews was the company's chief executive officer. As of 2013, the company had 13 offices throughout the United States, Europe, and Asia. It has worked with Fortune 500 executives, Hollywood celebrities, members of the British royal family, and professional athletes among others.

== History ==
Jill Kelleher, a former photographer, founded Kelleher International in 1986 in Greenbrae, California, an unincorporated community outside of San Francisco. Prior to opening Kelleher International, Jill worked as a photographer for a video dating service for three years. Her daughter, Amber Kelleher-Andrews later opened up Kelleher International's second office in Beverly Hills, California. Amber Kelleher-Andrews, a former actress, was later appointed chief executive officer of Kelleher International. The company focused its operations in San Francisco, Los Angeles, and New York City for its first twenty years before expanding throughout the United States and internationally.

In 2013, Amber Kelleher-Andrews starred in Ready for Love, a reality television matchmaking show that aired on NBC. Kelleher International hosts an annual gathering with hosts Amber Kelleher-Andrews and Sir Richard Branson at Necker Island that benefits Virgin Unite since January 2014.
