= Bloodsport (film series) =

Film series article

- Official film series logo
- Based on: Characters created by Sheldon Lettich
- Starring: Jean-Claude Van Damme; Daniel Bernhardt; Amy Johnston; (Other cast)
- Distributed by: Warner Bros. Pictures (1); Transcontinental Film Corporation (2); FM Home Video (3); Avalanche Home Entertainment (4); Vertical Entertainment (5)
- Country: United States
- Language: English
- Budget: >$11,500,000 (Total of 2 films)
- Box office: $50,697,460 (Total of 3 theatrical films)

The Bloodsport franchise consists of American martial arts-sports action-thriller installments including two theatrical films and two straight-to-home video sequels. Based on the purported true story experiences of Frank Dux, which have since been called into question, the series centers around the original story written by Sheldon Lettich. The plot involves American characters who compete in underground life-or-death mixed martial arts tournaments, while also competing for the honor of their instructors.

Though Bloodsport was a box office success in 1988, it was initially poorly received critically. It has since earned a significant following with modern-day analysis. Film critics have called the movie Van Damme's "crowning achievement", and "magnum opus"; categorized as one of "the best of the best", Bloodsport has earned its status as a cult classic. While the sequels have experienced mixed levels of success, the 1996 sequel was met with a warm critical response, with praise directed towards its cast namely Daniel Bernhardt's leading role. While it met expectations of the audience with some calling it superior to the original, its following installments were released via home video debut leading deplinishing financial income. Critical reception thereafter had likewise been meager: the 1997 follow-up received mixed reception; the 1999 installment was met with predominantly negative reactions; and the 2017 follow-up was met with praise for its graphic fight scenes, with criticism directed at its script and production values. The franchise as a whole has been a financial success for its associated studios.

The franchise will continue, with a new Bloodsport movie in active development, with Chad Stahelski and David Leitch's studio 87North Productions involved and the duo in early negotiations to serve as co-directors.

== Films ==
Film	U.S. release date	Director(s)	Screenwriter(s)	Story by	Producer(s)
Bloodsport	February 26, 1988	Newt Arnold	Mel Friedman, Sheldon Lettich & Christopher Cosby	Sheldon Lettich	Mark DiSalle
Bloodsport II: The Next Kumite	March 1, 1996	Alan Mehrez	Jeff Schechter	Jeff Schechter	Alan Mehrez
Bloodsport III	May 13, 1997	Alan Mehrez	James Williams	James Williams	Alan Mehrez
Bloodsport 4: The Dark Kumite	March 30, 1999	Elvis Restaino	George Saunders	George Saunders	Alan Mehrez
Lady Bloodfight	May 5, 2017	Chris Nahon	Bey Logan & Judd Bloch	Bey Logan	Bey Logan, Zev Foreman & Nicolas Chartier
Untitled film	TBA	David Leitch & Chad Stahelski	Phillip Noyce, James McTeigue, Craig Rosenberg & Robert Mark Kamen	Phillip Noyce & Robert Mark Kamen	Chris Brown, Alberto Lensi & Edward R. Pressman

=== Bloodsport (1988) ===
Frank Dux is an U.S. Army Captain who has been trained in mixed martial arts for much of his life by sensei Senzo Tanaka. Specializing in ninjutsu, Senzo considers Dux a part of his clan and begins to train the latter for a secretive competition in Hong Kong China known as the Kumite. Though a request for leave is rejected by his superiors upon request, Dux goes to China with his sensei. Through the difficult experiences of training for and gaining access to the elite underground organization of fighters, Frank begins a romantic relationship with a journalist named Janice. As the couple grow closer together, a number of militant officers begin to suspect that Dux has gone AWOL and initiate an investigation. After completing the dangerous initiatory training regimen, Dux is accepted into the Kumite. Determined to now rise to the occasion, Frank begins to realize that unless he succeeds he may not survive.

=== Bloodsport II: The Next Kumite (1996) ===
Criminal thief and streetfighter Alex Cardo, is arrested and sentenced to imprisonment after being caught in the act of stealing an ancient katana sword from a wealthy businessman named David Leung in East Asia. Living his days serving his sentence in a notoriously brutal prison, Alex finds he is repeatedly beaten by residents and the guards. Finding a friend and mentor figure in its walls named Master Sun, his life changes as Sun begins to train him in his practice. Disciplined extensively by his recent ally, including in the most lethal of styles which the master calls "The Iron Hand", Alex learns about a secretive fight-to-the-death tournament known as the Kumite. When he vows to win the championship for his mentor after he completes his sentence, his release comes sooner than expected. Presented with a mission by Leung, to recover the katana as an award for the winning Kumite, Alex enters the establishment determined to defeat each challenger. Battling various competitors in difficult circumstances, he begins to question whether he will succeed in his personal quest when he learns that the head guard from the penitentiary is the greatest participant in the Kumite. Despite the surmounting odds, Alex determines to keep his promise to Master Sun, with success while keeping his life.

=== Bloodsport III (1997) ===
After winning the Kumite, Alex Cardo works as an art dealer with an upstanding personal life who no longer has desires to compete in tournaments. When Alex declines the proposal of a millionaire named Jacques Duvalier who invites him to a Kumite that he is sponsoring, Jacques has his mentor and father figure Sun executed. Grieving his loss, and wanting revenge for the murder of his mentor, Alex is directed by David Leung to Sun's brother Master Makato. After previously meeting briefly, Sun's brother known by the Kumite as "the Judge", Makato begins to train Alex and build on the discipline he learned from Master Sun. With the decision to compete and honor the life of his mentor, he is faced with his greatest challenge yet in Duvalier's henchman; the most powerful fighter the Kumite has known named Beast.

=== Bloodsport 4: The Dark Kumite (1999) ===
Agent John Keller takes an undercover mission at a brutal prison named Fuego Penal, to investigate the disappearances of various inmates. Within its walls he discovers that underground fights known as the Kumite are taking place under the organization of a dangerous man named Justin Caesar. Realizing that the inmates are being forced to compete to the death, Keller becomes involved with the competition. Joining the Kumite, and hoping to disassemble the corrupt establishment from the inside out, he must survive to become the champion to realize this goal.

=== Lady Bloodfight (2016) ===
Jane Jones is trained by a martial arts champion named Master Shu. As Jane becomes noteworthy within the underground fighting community, Master Shu begins to train her for an all-female sect of the Kumite. For months, the duo trained rigorously to meet the expectations of the tournament. With the skills she has practiced and mastered, she must defeat some of the greatest fighters, including Ling whose sensei named Master Wai was the former best friend turned arch enemy of Master Shu. As Jane rises through the ranks, she competes for herself and for the honor of her trainer and friend.

=== Untitled film (TBA) ===
In May 2011, a reboot of the franchise was announced to be in development. Phillip Noyce signed on as director, with a script by Robert Mark Kamen. The plot was said to follow an American who travels to Brazil to recover from violent experiences he had in Afghanistan, who eventually gets involved in a martial arts contest. Edward R. Pressman is serving as producer, while Mark DiSalles is attached as executive producer. Jean-Claude Van Damme, who had publicly expressed interest in collaborating on the project in some capacity, will not appear in the film nor be involved. In October 2012, Kamen stated that Van Damme will not be involved because the film has no connection to the original, stating: "This film resembles the original in title only. …This is a character driven, politically motivated film."

By July 2013, James McTeigue signed on as director. The script, he co-wrote with Craig Rosenberg, will be a rewrite of the original draft by Robert Mark Kamen and will be based on the original story by Kamen and Phillip Noyce. The plot will detail the life of 21st century mercenaries, as they fight in the underground world of Brazilian Vale Tudo matches. The project will be a joint-venture production between Relativity Media, Pictures in Paradise Pty Ltd, and Trans-American Films International. Pressman will serve as producer alongside Chris Brown, and Alberto Lensi. Principal photography was scheduled to commence during the first quarter of 2014, in Australia and Brazil.

In June 2019 after various delays, it was announced that Chad Stahelski and David Leitch had entered early negotiations to serve as co-directors of the film. Discussions for Van Damme to appear feature in the movie to some capacity was ongoing, while franchise creator Sheldon Lettich stated that the filmmakers had approached him with their pitch; acknowledging his excitement for the project. By April 2025, A24 Films, LLC became involved with the project with negotiations to produce. In 2026, Michaela Coel was brought on to write and direct the film.

== Main cast and characters ==
List indicator

This section includes characters who will appear or have appeared in the franchise in main roles.

- An empty grey cell indicates the character was not in the film, or that the character's official presence has not yet been confirmed.

Character	Films				
Character	Bloodsport	Bloodsport II: The Next Kumite	Bloodsport III	Bloodsport 4: The Dark Kumite	Lady Bloodfight
Character	1988	1996	1997	1999	2016
Cpt. Frank Dux	Jean-Claude Van Damme Pierre Rafini^{Y}				
Master Senzo Tanaka	Roy Chiao				
Ray Jackson	Donald Gibb	Donald Gibb			
Alex Cardo		Daniel Bernhardt	Daniel Bernhardt		
Master Sun		James Hong	James Hong		
Master Macado The Judge		Hee-il Cho	Hee-il Cho Gerald Okamura^{V}		
David Leung		Pat Morita	Pat Morita		
Jason Cardo			David Schatz		
Agent John Keller				Daniel Bernhardt	
Jane Jones					Amy Johnston
Master Shu					Muriel Hofmann
Ling					Jenny Wu
Master Wai					Kathy Wu

== Additional crew and production details ==
Title	Crew/Detail					
Title	Composer	Cinematographer	Editor(s)	Production companies	Distributing companies	Running time
Bloodsport	Paul Hertzog	David Worth	Carl Kress	Cannon International	Warner Bros. Pictures; U.G.C. Worldwide Distribution	92 min
Bloodsport II: The Next Kumite	Stephen Edwards	Jacques Haitkin	J. Douglas Seeling	FM Entertainment International N.V.	Transcontinental Film Corporation	86 min
Bloodsport III	Stephen Edwards	Kevan Lind	Ron Cabreros	FM Entertainment International N.V.	FM Home Video	92 min
Bloodsport 4: The Dark Kumite	Alex Wurman	George Mooradian	Frank Sacco	FM Entertainment International N.V.	Avalanche Home Entertainment	100 min
Lady Bloodfight	Mark Kilian	Michel Abramowicz	Chris Nahon; Frédéric Thoraval	B&E Productions; Voltage Productions	Voltage Pictures; Vertical Entertainment	100 min
Untitled film	TBA	TBA	TBA	Relativity Media; 87North Productions; Pictures in Paradise Pty Ltd; Trans-American Films International	Warner Bros. Pictures	TBA

== Reception ==
=== Box office and financial performance ===
Film	Box office gross			Box office ranking		Budget	Worldwide total gross income	Ref.
Film	North America	Other territories	Worldwide	All-time North America	All-time worldwide	Budget	Worldwide total gross income	Ref.
Bloodsport	$11,806,119	$38,193,881	$50,000,000	#4,784	#6,536	$1,500,000	$63,500,000	
Bloodsport II: The Next Kumite	$684,351	—N/a	$684,351	#8,983	#14,898	Information not publicly available	<$684,351	
Bloodsport III	—N/a	—N/a	—N/a	—N/a	—N/a	Information not publicly available	Information not publicly available	
Bloodsport 4: The Dark Kumite	—N/a	—N/a	—N/a	—N/a	—N/a	Information not publicly available	Information not publicly available	
Lady Bloodfight	—N/a	$13,109	$13,109	#17,945	#26,036	$10,000,000	-$9,986,891	
Totals	$12,490,470	$38,206,990	$50,697,460	x̄ #6,342	x̄ #9,494	>$11,500,000	≥$54,197,460	

=== Critical and public response ===
Title	Rotten Tomatoes	Metacritic
Bloodsport	50% (30 reviews)	29/100 (5 reviews)
Bloodsport II: The New Kumite	—N/a	—N/a
Bloodport III	—N/a	—N/a
Bloodport 4: The Dark Kumite	—N/a	—N/a
Lady Bloodfight	40% (5 reviews)	—N/a (2 reviews)
