= Onodera =

Onodera (written: 小野寺 or オノデラ in katakana) is a Japanese surname. Notable people with the surname include:

- Chikara Onodera (小野寺 力, born 1980), Japanese baseball player
- Itsunori Onodera (小野寺 五典, born 1960), Japanese politician
- Kaho Onodera (小野寺 佳步, born 1991), Japanese curler
- Lisa Onodera, American film producer
- Masaya Onodera, Japanese mixed martial artist
- Masayuki Onodera (小野寺 雅之, born 1998), Japanese badminton player
- Midi Onodera, Japanese-Canadian filmmaker
- Shiho Onodera (小野寺 志保, born 1973), Japanese footballer
- Taishi Onodera (小野寺 太志, born 1996), Japanese volleyball player
- Tatsuya Onodera (小野寺 達也, born 1987), Japanese footballer
- Onodera Yoshimichi (小野寺 義道, 1566–1645), Japanese daimyō
- Yuki Onodera (オノデラ ユキ, born 1962), Japanese photographer

== Fictional characters ==
- Haru Onodera (小野寺 春), a character in the manga series Nisekoi
- Kosaki Onodera (小野寺 小咲), a character in the manga series Nisekoi
- Ritsu Onodera (小野寺 律), a character in the manga series Sekai-ichi Hatsukoi
- Yusuke Onodera (小野寺 ユウスケ), a character in the television series Kamen Rider Decade
- PunPun Onodera (小野寺 プンプン), a character in the manga series Oyasumi Punpun
