= Amber Kelleher-Andrews =

American relationship matchmaker (1969–2025)

- Born: Amber Van Lent; March 31, 1969
- Died: April 13, 2025 (aged 56)
- Occupations: Matchmaker, model, actress
- Known for: CEO of Kelleher International; Matchmaker on Ready for Love

Amber Kelleher-Andrews (March 31, 1969 – April 13, 2025) was an American relationship matchmaker. She was the co-founder and CEO of Kelleher International, one of the largest matchmaking firms in the United States.

In 2013, she was a matchmaker on NBC's Ready for Love.

== Education and early career ==
Kelleher-Andrews studied anthropology in the California State education program at Santa Barbara. Shortly afterwards, she joined film school in San Francisco before moving to Hollywood. Credited as Amber Van Lent, Kelleher-Andrews appeared in films such as Bloodsport III, Mind Rage, and Lying Eyes. She also had roles on TV shows including Baywatch, Melrose Place, and Nash Bridges.

== Career ==
In 1997, she joined her mother’s matchmaking business, Kelleher International, as the CEO of the Los Angeles office.

In addition to her role as CEO, Kelleher-Andrews was an expert relationship consultant on television programs including Good Morning America, the Today Show, and 20/20.

Kelleher-Andrews also hosted a radio talk show called The Rules of Engagement on KFWB News Talk 980. She appeared as a matchmaker on NBC's Ready for Love in 2013.

== Death ==
Kelleher-Andrews died on April 13, 2025, at the age of 56. Richard Branson, a longtime friend, paid tribute.

== Filmography ==
=== Television ===
- Ready for Love (2013)
- Baywatch (1998)
- Nash Bridges (1997)
- The Jeff Foxworthy Show (1995)
- Married... with Children (1994)
- Melrose Place (1994)
- Silk Stalkings (1993)
- Herman's Head (1992)
- Wings (1992)
- Round Trip to Heaven (1992)
- Human Target (1992)
- Baby Talk (1991)

=== TV Movies ===
- Lying Eyes (1996)
- Bloodsport III (1996)
- Marilyn & Bobby; Her Final Affair (1993)

=== Film ===
- Mind Rage (2004)
