= The Cutter (film) =

- Official DVD cover
- Directed by: Bill Tannen
- Written by: Bruce Haskett
- Produced by: Danny Lerner; Pinchas Perry; Les Weldon
- Starring: Chuck Norris; Joanna Pacuła; Daniel Bernhardt; Bernie Kopell; Todd Jensen; Marshall R. Teague; Tracy Scoggins; Curt Lowens
- Cinematography: Peter Moss
- Edited by: Jason A. Payne
- Music by: Elia Cmiral
- Production companies: Modern Digital; North by Northwest Entertainment
- Distributed by: Sony Pictures Entertainment
- Release dates: November 23, 2005 (Romania); March 14, 2006 (United States)
- Running time: 92 minutes
- Country: United States
- Language: English

The Cutter is a 2005 American direct-to-video action film directed by Bill Tannen, and starring Chuck Norris, Joanna Pacuła, Daniel Bernhardt, Bernie Kopell and Marshall R. Teague. After a deadly kidnapping rescue gone wrong, a guilt-ridden detective recruits his specialized SWAT team to successfully rescue an aged diamond cutter from the hands of a murderous thief.

== Plot ==
A former Spokane, Washington cop turned private investigator takes on a case of a missing diamond cutter that leads him on an adventure of love and villainy spanning from the Nazis to the present-day Mob.

== Cast ==
- Chuck Norris as Detective John Sheperd
- Joanna Pacuła as Elizabeth "Liz" Teller
- Daniel Bernhardt as Dirk Cross
- Bernie Kopell as Isaac Teller
- Todd Jensen as Agent Parks
- Tracy Scoggins as Alena
- Marshall R. Teague as Lieutenant Moore
- Deron McBee as Alex, the Repairman
- Dean Cochran as Eddie
- Curt Lowens as Col. Speerman
- Aaron Norris as Anthony Maylan
- Mark Ivanir as Dr. Joseph

== Production ==
=== Filming ===
Shooting took place in Spokane, Washington.

== Release ==
=== Home media ===
Sony released it to DVD in the US on March 14, 2006.

== Reception ==
=== Critical response ===
Scott Weinberg of DVD Talk rated it 1.5/5 stars and called it "the epitome of all things cinematically generic". David Johnson of DVD Talk wrote, "The Cutter is a mediocre film overall, and, specifically, a tame and lame action flick."

== See also ==
- List of American films of 2006
