= Matthew Hussey =

British dating coach, YouTube personality, and writer

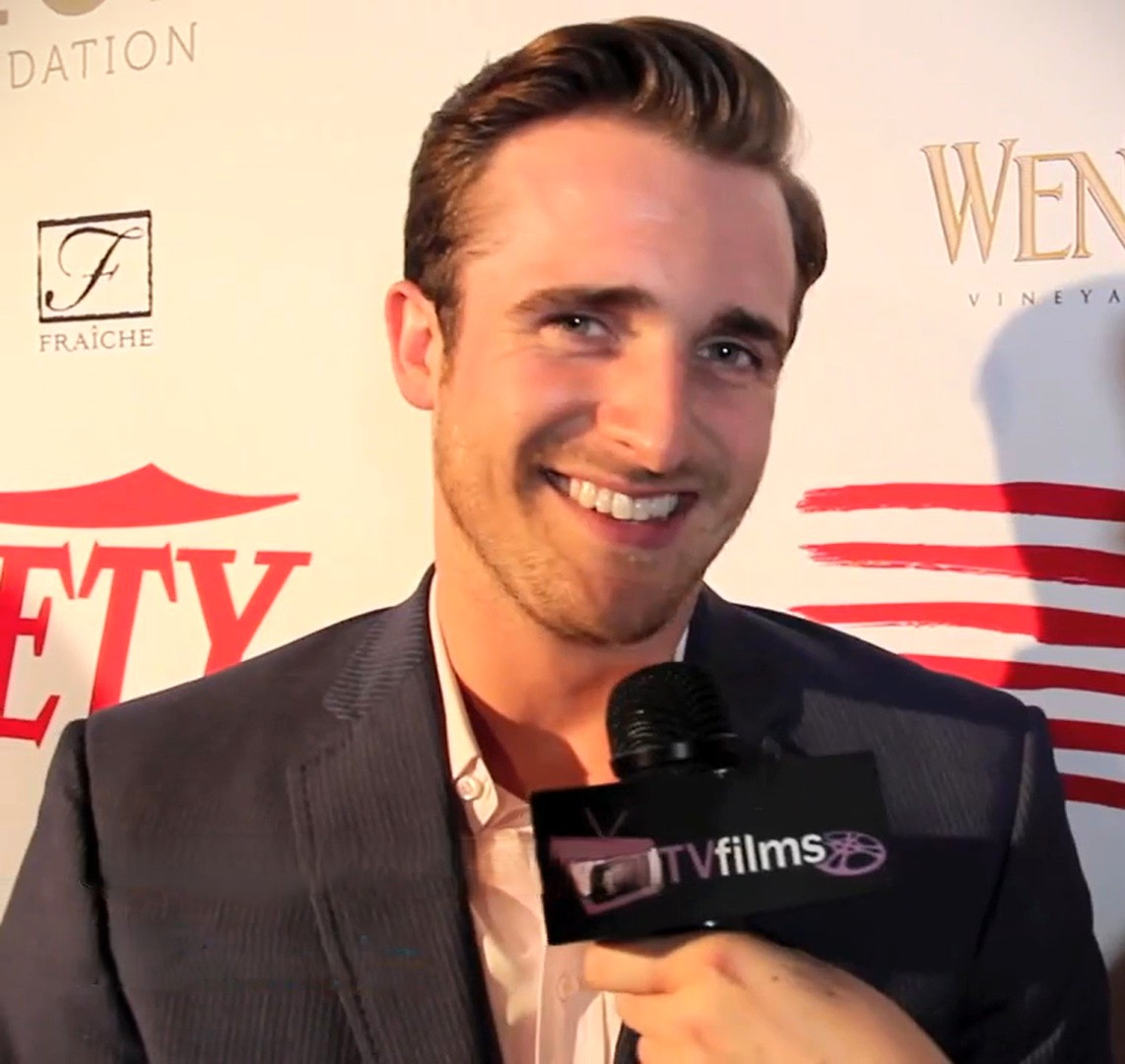
- Hussey in 2012
- Born: 19 June 1987 (age 39); Essex, England
- Occupations: Dating coach; author
- Notable work: Get the Guy (2013); Love Life (2024)
- Spouse: Audrey Le Strat (m. 2023)
- Children: 1
- Website: matthewhussey.com

Matthew Hussey (born 19 June 1987) is a British author, dating coach and YouTuber. He is known for his 2013 book Get the Guy and his 2024 book, Love Life: How to Raise Your Standards, Find Your Person, and Live Happily (No Matter What).

== Early life ==
Hussey grew up in Essex, England.

== Career ==
Hussey began working as a life coach in his late teens. He was a dating coach for men before switching to women in 2008. In 2010, he moved to the United States and attracted a following, which included actresses Eva Longoria and Tyra Banks.

Hussey offers "Get the Guy" online tutorials, 7-hour seminars and $4,000 retreats periodically in the UK and the United States. Seminars include diagnostics, gendered advice on how to approach, and lines and text messages tailored to various situations. The $10,000/hour price tag for his one-on-one coaching has attracted media attention.

He hosted the radio show Love Life with Matthew Hussey. He has also made many television appearances, including being the matchmaker on NBC's Ready for Love. He has been the resident love expert on the Today Show.

He hosts the Love Life podcast and is frequently joined by special guests, as well as his wife, Audrey, and his brother, Stephen.

=== Authorship ===
In 2013, Hussey released a book titled Get The Guy: Learn Secrets of the Male Mind to Find the Man You Want and the Love You Deserve. The book was a New York Times bestseller. He has written a column in Cosmopolitan since 2015.

In May 2024, his book Love Life: How to Raise Your Standards, Find Your Person, and Live Happily (No Matter What) debuted at #3 on the New York Times nonfiction advice/how to bestseller charts.

== Views ==
Hussey believes that while technology has made modern dating more efficient, it may not necessarily lead to successful long-term relationships.

== Personal life ==
Hussey's brother, Stephen, often appears on videos on Hussey's YouTube channel and writes content for Hussey's site. Their father Steve has been involved with Get the Guy.

In 2018, Hussey was in a relationship with American singer Camila Cabello after he met her while on the Today Show. They broke up in 2019.

In 2020, Hussey began a relationship with Frenchwoman Audrey Le Strat. While in London, the couple got engaged in February 2022. In October 2023, they married in Sicily. In fall 2025, Le Strat gave birth to their first child, a son.
