= Mayling Ng =

British actress

- Born: United Kingdom
- Education: Calderstones School
- Occupations: Actress; personal trainer; model
- Years active: 2013-present

Chinese name
- Traditional Chinese: 黃美玲
- Simplified Chinese: 黄美玲
Transcriptions
Standard Mandarin
- Hanyu Pinyin: Huángměilíng

Mayling Ng is a British actress. She played Orana in Wonder Woman, and Mongal in The Suicide Squad.

== Early life ==
Ng was born in the United Kingdom to a Singaporean-Chinese father and British mother. She spent her early years in Tenerife, Canary Islands and went to Calderstones School in Liverpool before the family moved to Spain and then Singapore. They then moved to California, where Ng is based.

== Career ==
Ng is an actress, personal trainer, fitness model, and entrepreneur. She received the Barclays Entrepreneur Award for her Lyte protein restaurant concept and opened three locations in Spain before moving to Singapore where she founded her own fitness and personal training company while becoming a competitive athlete.

== Filmography ==
=== Film ===
Year	Title	Role	Notes
2013	Mister John	Yasmin	
2017	Wonder Woman	Orana	
2016	Lady Bloodfight	Svietta	
2018	The Scorpion King: Book of Souls	Khensa	
2019	Acceleration	Lillian	
2019	Blood Hunters: Rise of the Hybrids	Maya	
2019	Muna	Brunilda	
2020	Debt Collectors	Britt	
2021	The Suicide Squad	Mongal	
TBA	Legend of the White Dragon	Tek Boh	
