= 1993 in Shooto =

Mixed martial arts events

Information
- First date: February 26, 1993
- Last date: November 25, 1993

Events
- Total events: 4

Fights
- Total fights: 25

Chronology
1992 in Shooto	1993 in Shooto	1994 in Shooto

The year 1993 is the 5th year in the history of Shooto, a mixed martial arts promotion based in the Japan. In 1993 Shooto held 4 events beginning with, Shooto: Shooto.

== Events list ==
#	Event Title	Date	Arena	Location
25	Shooto: November 25	November 25, 1993	Korakuen Hall	Tokyo, Japan
24	Shooto: June 24	June 24, 1993	Korakuen Hall	Tokyo, Japan
23	Shooto: April 26	April 26, 1993	Korakuen Hall	Tokyo, Japan
22	Shooto: February 26	February 26, 1993	Korakuen Hall	Tokyo, Japan

== Shooto: February 26 ==
Shooto: Shooto was an event held on February 26, 1993, at Korakuen Hall in Tokyo, Japan.

=== Results ===
Main Card
Weight class				Method	Round	Time	Notes
	Manabu Yamada	def.	Naoki Sakurada	Submission (Kneebar)	5	1:19
	Yasuto Sekishima	def.	Kazuhiro Kusayanagi	Decision (Unanimous)	5	3:00
	Yuji Ito	def.	Takashi Ishizaki	Submission (Kimura)	1	2:11
	Kazuhiro Sakamoto	def.	Suguru Shigeno	Submission (Armbar)	2	0:55
	Hiroyuki Kanno	vs.	Kenji Ogusu	Draw	3	3:00
	Takenori Ito	def.	Masato Suzuki	Decision (Unanimous)	3	3:00

== Shooto: April 26 ==
Shooto: Shooto was an event held on April 26, 1993, at Korakuen Hall in Tokyo, Japan.

=== Results ===
Main Card
Weight class				Method	Round	Time	Notes
	Yuji Ito	vs.	Yasuto Sekishima	Draw	5	3:00
	Kazuhiro Sakamoto	def.	Mamoru Okochi	Submission (Kimura)	3	0:35
	Hiroyuki Kanno	def.	Masaya Onodera	Submission (Armbar)	2	2:31
	Kyuhei Ueno	def.	Takenori Ito	Submission (Armbar)	1	2:35
	Yuki Nakai	def.	Hiroki Noritsugi	Submission (Kimura)	1	0:53

== Shooto: June 24 ==
Shooto: Shooto was an event held on June 24, 1993, at Korakuen Hall in Tokyo, Japan.

=== Results ===
Main Card
Weight class				Method	Round	Time	Notes
	Manabu Yamada	def.	Chad Stahelski	Submission (Kneebar)	1	2:08
	Erik Paulson	def.	Kazuhiro Kusayanagi	Submission (Triangle Choke)	3	1:46
	Noboru Asahi	def.	Masato Suzuki	Submission (Armbar)	5	1:39
	Kenji Ogusu	vs.	Takeshi Miyanaga	Draw	3	3:00
	Kyuhei Ueno	def.	Eiji Mizuno	Submission (Armbar)	1	2:07
	Yuki Nakai	def.	Masakazu Kuramochi	Submission (Heel Hook)	2	1:36

== Shooto: November 25 ==
Shooto: Shooto was an event held on November 25, 1993, at Korakuen Hall in Tokyo, Japan.

=== Results ===
Main Card
Weight class				Method	Round	Time	Notes
	Naoki Sakurada	vs.	Erik Paulson	Draw	5	3:00
	Yuji Ito	def.	Yasunori Okuda	TKO (Retirement)	2	3:00
	Noboru Asahi	def.	Yuki Nakai	Decision (Majority)	5	3:00
	Masato Suzuki	vs.	Kyuhei Ueno	Draw	4	3:00
	Takeshi Miyanaga	def.	Mamoru Okochi	Decision (Unanimous)	3	3:00
	Kenji Ogusu	def.	Satoshi Fukuoka	Submission (Kneebar)	3	2:52
	Eiji Mizuno	vs.	Takuya Kuwabara	Draw	4	3:00
	Masahiro Oishi	def.	Yoshiaki Murai	Decision (Unanimous)	3	3:00

== See also ==
- Shooto
- List of Shooto champions
- List of Shooto Events
