= Yorinaga Nakamura =

Retired Japanese Shootfighting instructor

- Born: December 19, 1963 (age 62); Mie Prefecture, Japan
- Style: Shootfighting, Jeet Kune Do
- Teachers: Satoru Sayama, Dan Inosanto

Other information
- Notable students: Erik Paulson, Ron Balicki, Dan Inosanto

Yorinaga Nakamura (中村頼永, Nakamura Yorinaga), also known as Yori Nakamura, is a retired Japanese instructor in Shootfighting, Jeet Kune Do, Kali, Silat, and Muay Thai.

== Life and career ==
Nakamura had trained in various martial arts, among them Boxing, Kung Fu and Kansui-ryu Karate, until February 1984 when he enrolled at the Tiger Gym of Satoru Sayama. In November 1985, he became a full-time staff member of Sayama's gym. He trained in Sayama's style of Shootfighting and in June 1986, he competed at the tournament celebrated in the first Shooto event. He won the first fight by decision, the second by rear naked choke, the third by keylock and the last by pillow hold, winning the tournament.

In January 1989, Nakamura went to the United States and became a student of Dan Inosanto in Jeet Kune Do, Filipino martial arts, and silat. In 1992, he founded USA Shooto Association. On returning to Japan the same year, he became the founder and head instructor of Inosanto-Methods Unified Martial Arts Association (IUMA).

== Notable students ==
- Ron Balicki: MARS Head Instructor, producer, stuntman
- Dan Inosanto: martial arts instructor
- Junichi Okada: actor and martial arts instructor
- Erik Paulson: CSW Head Instructor

== Lineages ==
Catch wrestling (+ Shooto) lineage

- Billy Riley/Frank Wolfe → Karl Gotch → Satoru Sayama → Yorinaga Nakamura

Jeet Kune Do lineage

- Bruce Lee → Dan Inosanto → Yorinaga Nakamura
