= Eiji Mizuno =

Japanese mixed martial artist

Eiji Mizuno 水野英二
- Born: Japan
- Nationality: Japanese
- Years active: 1993–1994

Mixed martial arts record
- Total: 3
- Wins: 1
- By decision: 1
- Losses: 1
- By submission: 1
- Draws: 1

Other information
- Mixed martial arts record from Sherdog

Eiji Mizuno (Japanese: 水野英二) is a Japanese mixed martial artist.

== Mixed martial arts record ==
Professional record breakdown
3 matches	1 win	1 loss
By submission	0	1
By decision	1	0
Draws	1	

Res.	Record	Opponent	Method	Event	Date	Round	Time	Location	Notes
Win	1–1–1	Misaki Kubota	Decision (unanimous)	Shooto - Shooto	May 6, 1994	3	3:00	Tokyo, Japan	
Draw	0–1–1	Takuya Kuwabara	Draw	Shooto - Shooto	November 25, 1993	4	3:00	Tokyo, Japan	
Loss	0–1	Kyuhei Ueno	Submission (armbar)	Shooto - Shooto	June 24, 1993	1	2:07	Tokyo, Japan	

== See also ==
- List of male mixed martial artists
