= Masato Suzuki =

Japanese mixed martial artist

- Born: Japan
- Nationality: Japanese
- Years active: 1991 - 1996

Mixed martial arts record
- Total: 11
- Wins: 4
- By submission: 2
- By decision: 2
- Losses: 5
- By submission: 3
- By decision: 2
- Draws: 2

Other information
- Mixed martial arts record from Sherdog

Masato Suzuki is a Japanese mixed martial artist.

== Mixed martial arts record ==
Professional record breakdown
11 matches	4 wins	5 losses
By submission	2	3
By decision	2	2
Draws	2	

Res.	Record	Opponent	Method	Event	Date	Round	Time	Location	Notes
Loss	4–5–2	Rumina Sato	Technical Submission (armbar)	Shooto - Vale Tudo Junction 1	January 20, 1996	1	3:00	Tokyo, Japan	
Win	4–4–2	Yuji Hashiguchi	Submission (kimura)	Shooto - Vale Tudo Access 4	May 12, 1995	2	2:59	Japan	
Win	3–4–2	Masahiro Oishi	Submission (armbar)	Shooto - Vale Tudo Access 1	September 26, 1994	2	0:43	Tokyo, Japan	
Draw	2–4–2	Kyuhei Ueno	Draw	Shooto - Shooto	November 25, 1993	4	3:00	Tokyo, Japan	
Loss	2–4–1	Noboru Asahi	Submission (armbar)	Shooto - Shooto	June 24, 1993	5	1:39	Tokyo, Japan	
Loss	2–3–1	Takenori Ito	Decision (unanimous)	Shooto - Shooto	February 26, 1993	3	3:00	Tokyo, Japan	
Draw	2–2–1	Masaya Onodera	Draw	Shooto - Shooto	September 25, 1992	3	3:00	Tokyo, Japan	
Loss	2–2	Takashi Ishizaki	Decision (unanimous)	Shooto - Shooto	July 23, 1992	4	3:00	Tokyo, Japan	
Win	2–1	Takenori Ito	Decision (unanimous)	Shooto - Shooto	March 27, 1992	3	3:00	Tokyo, Japan	
Loss	1–1	Noboru Asahi	Submission (kneebar)	Shooto - Shooto	October 17, 1991	1	0:00	Osaka, Japan	
Win	1–0	Kenji Ogusu	Decision (unanimous)	Shooto - Shooto	August 25, 1991	3	3:00	Tokyo, Japan	

== See also ==
- List of male mixed martial artists
