= Takeshi Miyanaga =

Japanese mixed martial artist

Takeshi Miyanaga 宮永武司
- Born: Japan
- Nationality: Japanese
- Division: Bantamweight
- Years active: 1992 - 1994

Mixed martial arts record
- Total: 4
- Wins: 2
- By submission: 1
- By decision: 1
- Losses: 0
- Draws: 2

Other information
- Mixed martial arts record from Sherdog

Takeshi Miyanaga Japanese: 宮永武司 is a Japanese mixed martial artist. He competed in the Bantamweight division.

== Mixed martial arts record ==
Professional record breakdown
4 matches	2 wins	0 losses
By submission	1	0
By decision	1	0
Draws	2	

Res.	Record	Opponent	Method	Event	Date	Round	Time	Location	Notes
Win	2-0-2	Jun Kanetaka	Submission (heel hook)	Shooto - Shooto	January 14, 1994	1	2:23	Tokyo, Japan	
Win	1-0-2	Mamoru Okochi	Decision (unanimous)	Shooto - Shooto	November 25, 1993	3	3:00	Tokyo, Japan	
Draw	0-0-2	Kenji Ogusu	Draw	Shooto - Shooto	June 24, 1993	3	3:00	Tokyo, Japan	
Draw	0-0-1	Satoshi Fukuoka	Draw	Shooto - Shooto	November 27, 1992	3	3:00	Tokyo, Japan	

== See also ==
- List of male mixed martial artists
