= Durango Kids =

- An original 1999 poster for the film
- Directed by: Ashton Root
- Written by: William Martin Brennan; Ashton Root
- Produced by: William Martin Brennan; Heidi Falls; Mitchell Gossett; Timothy Gray; Lauren Letherer; Ashton Root; Jack B. Root
- Starring: Brendon Ryan Barrett; Curtis Williams; Caitlin Lara Barrett; Taylor Root; Austin Nichols; Christina Milian; Sara Paxton; Patrika Darbo; Harrison Young; Mike Genovese; William Martin Brennan; Melissa Berger; Don Gibb; David Kirkwood; Larry Drake
- Cinematography: David M. Rakoczy
- Edited by: Tim Silano
- Music by: Erik Lundmark
- Production company: Good Friends Productions
- Distributed by: PorchLight Entertainment
- Release date: October 10, 1999
- Country: United States
- Language: English

Durango Kids is a 1999 American live-action comedy-drama adventure film produced by Good Friends Productions that was released on October 10, 1999 by PorchLight Entertainment. The film won the 2001 Santa Clarita International Film Festival (now the International Family Film Festival) award for Best Cinematographer and the 2002 Moondance International Film Festival Seahorse award for film score.

The film was released to DVD by Lionsgate Home Entertainment on January 15, 2004.

== Cast ==
- Larry Drake as Dudley
- Brendon Ryan Barrett as Taylor
- Curtis Williams as Cameron
- Caitlin Lara Barrett as Katie
- Taylor Root as Spencer Grey
- Don Gibb as Mountain Man Morris
- David Kirkwood as Jacob Bigalow
- Austin Nichols as Sammy
- Christina Milian as Eleanor "Ellie" Bigelow
- Sara Paxton as Hillary
- Patrika Darbo as Mrs. Grey
- Harrison Young as Uncle Gus
- Mike Genovese as Tom Walsh
- William Martin Brennan as Crazy Eddie
- Melissa Berger as Jane Calloway
