= Kyuhei Ueno =

Japanese mixed martial arts fighter

- Born: Japan
- Nationality: Japanese
- Weight: 143 lb (65 kg; 10.2 st)
- Division: Featherweight; Lightweight; Welterweight
- Years active: 1993 - 1998

Mixed martial arts record
- Total: 16
- Wins: 10
- By knockout: 3
- By submission: 5
- By decision: 2
- Losses: 5
- By submission: 3
- By decision: 2
- Draws: 1

Other information
- Mixed martial arts record from Sherdog

Kyuhei Ueno (上野 九平, Ueno Kyūhei) is a Japanese mixed martial artist. He competed in the Featherweight, Lightweight and Welterweight division.

== Mixed martial arts record ==
Professional record breakdown
| 16 matches | 10 wins | 5 losses |
| By knockout | 3 | 0 |
| By submission | 5 | 3 |
| By decision | 2 | 2 |
| Draws | 1 | |

| Res. | Record | Opponent | Method | Event | Date | Round | Time | Location | Notes |
|---|---|---|---|---|---|---|---|---|---|
| Loss | 10–5–1 | Satoshi Fujisaki | Submission (armbar) | Shooto - Shooter's Dream | September 18, 1998 | 1 | 2:23 | Setagaya, Tokyo, Japan | |
| Loss | 10–4–1 | Naoki Mori | Decision (unanimous) | Daidojuku - WARS 4 | March 11, 1997 | 5 | 3:00 | Tokyo, Japan | |
| Loss | 10–3–1 | Rumina Sato | Submission (rear-naked choke) | Shooto - Vale Tudo Junction 2 | March 5, 1996 | 1 | 4:04 | Tokyo, Japan | |
| Win | 10–2–1 | Naoki Mori | Decision (unanimous) | Daidojuku - WARS 3 | February 17, 1996 | 2 | 3:00 | Japan | |
| Win | 9–2–1 | Arnold Sas | Submission (triangle/armbar) | Shooto - Vale Tudo Junction 1 | January 20, 1996 | 3 | 0:44 | Tokyo, Japan | |
| Win | 8–2–1 | Toru Koga | TKO (punches) | Shooto - Tokyo Free Fight | November 7, 1995 | 3 | 1:43 | Tokyo, Japan | |
| Win | 7–2–1 | Kazuhiro Kusayanagi | TKO (punches) | Shooto - Complete Vale Tudo Access | July 29, 1995 | 5 | 1:17 | Omiya, Saitama, Japan | |
| Win | 6–2–1 | Maurice Roumimper | Submission (armbar) | Shooto - Vale Tudo Access 4 | May 12, 1995 | 1 | 1:42 | Japan | |
| Win | 5–2–1 | Kenichi Tanaka | Decision (unanimous) | Shooto - Vale Tudo Access 3 | January 21, 1995 | 5 | 3:00 | Tokyo, Japan | |
| Loss | 4–2–1 | Noboru Asahi | Decision (unanimous) | Shooto - Vale Tudo Access 2 | November 7, 1994 | 5 | 3:00 | Tokyo, Japan | |
| Loss | 4–1–1 | Yuki Nakai | Submission (arm-triangle choke) | Shooto - Shooto | May 6, 1994 | 5 | 0:32 | Tokyo, Japan | |
| Win | 4–0–1 | Yoshihiko Abe | KO | Shooto - Shooto | March 18, 1994 | 1 | 1:48 | Tokyo, Japan | |
| Win | 3–0–1 | Hiroshi Yoshida | Submission (armbar) | Shooto - Shooto | January 14, 1994 | 3 | 1:40 | Tokyo, Japan | |
| Draw | 2–0–1 | Masato Suzuki | Draw | Shooto - Shooto | November 25, 1993 | 4 | 3:00 | Tokyo, Japan | |
| Win | 2–0 | Eiji Mizuno | Submission (armbar) | Shooto - Shooto | June 24, 1993 | 1 | 2:07 | Tokyo, Japan | |
| Win | 1–0 | Takenori Ito | Submission (armbar) | Shooto - Shooto | April 26, 1993 | 1 | 2:35 | Tokyo, Japan | |

== See also ==
- List of male mixed martial artists
