= Lloyd (film) =

2001 film by Hector Barron

- Directed by: Hector Barron
- Written by: Hector Barron
- Produced by: Samuel Calvillo
- Starring: Todd Bosley; Brendon Ryan Barrett; Tom Arnold
- Cinematography: Michael Orefice
- Edited by: Hector Barron; Samuel Calvillo; Chris Cundy; Karen Weintraub
- Music by: Conrad Pope
- Production companies: Shadow Productions; Lloyd T.U.C.K.
- Distributed by: SoHo Entertainment
- Release date: May 4, 2001
- Running time: 74 minutes
- Country: United States
- Language: English

Lloyd is a 2001 American comedy film. It was released as The Ugly Kid. The film was released on May 4, 2001.

== Plot ==
Lloyd is the "class clown." He often gets in trouble with teachers, one of whom is very strict. When he tries to rebel, he is put into a class for "less enthusiastic students." Once there, he joins the other students in the group: Troy, Carla, and Storm. He soon falls in love with the class's newest member, Tracy (Kristin Parker). However, Tracy soon becomes romantically involved with Storm. When Lloyd talks to his mother, she tells him that he can still win her back by being himself.

The role of Lloyd is played by Todd Bosley. Tom Arnold, a friend of the producers, played a small role.

== Cast ==
- Todd Bosley - Lloyd
- Brendon Ryan Barrett - Troy
- Mary Mara - Joann
- Chloe Peterson - Carla
- Sammy Elliott - Nathan
- Patrick Higgins - Storm
- Kristin Parker - Tracy
- Tom Arnold - Tom
- Taylor Negron - Mr. Weid

== Production ==
The film was shot in Sunnyvale, California, in 1997.
