= Kenji Ogusu =

Japanese mixed martial artist

Kenji Ogusu 小楠健志
- Born: 1971 (age 54–55); Hamamatsu, Shizuoka prefecture, Japan
- Height: 161 cm (5 ft 3 in)
- Weight: 60 kg (132 lb; 9 st 6 lb)
- Division: Fly weight
- Style: SHOOTO, Brazilian Jiu-Jitsu Black Belter, Ju-do Black belter
- Team: Kiguchi Dojo, K.O. SHOOTO GYM
- Rank: SHOOTO World Rank 2
- Years active: 1991 - 1993

Mixed martial arts record
- Total: 8
- Wins: 3
- By submission: 1
- By decision: 2
- Losses: 1
- By decision: 1
- Draws: 4

Other information
- Mixed martial arts record from Sherdog

Kenji Ogusu Japanese: 小楠健志 is a Japanese retired mixed martial artist.

== Mixed martial arts record ==
Professional record breakdown
8 matches	3 wins	1 loss
By submission	1	0
By decision	2	1
Draws	4	

Res.	Record	Opponent	Method	Event	Date	Round	Time	Location	Notes
Win	3–1–4	Satoshi Fukuoka	Submission (kneebar)	Shooto - Shooto	November 25, 1993	3	2:52	Tokyo, Japan	
Draw	2–1–4	Takeshi Miyanaga	Draw	Shooto - Shooto	June 24, 1993	3	3:00	Tokyo, Japan	
Draw	2–1–3	Hiroyuki Kanno	Draw	Shooto - Shooto	February 26, 1993	3	3:00	Tokyo, Japan	
Draw	2–1–2	Tadashi Murakami	Draw	Shooto - Shooto	September 25, 1992	3	3:00	Tokyo, Japan	
Win	2–1–1	Yoshiaki Murai	Decision (unanimous)	Shooto - Shooto	July 23, 1992	3	3:00	Tokyo, Japan	
Draw	1–1–1	Misaki Kubota	Draw	Shooto - Shooto	May 29, 1992	3	3:00	Tokyo, Japan	
Win	1–1	Toshio Ando	Decision (unanimous)	Shooto - Shooto	March 27, 1992	3	3:00	Tokyo, Japan	
Loss	0–1	Masato Suzuki	Decision (unanimous)	Shooto - Shooto	August 25, 1991	3	3:00	Tokyo, Japan	

== See also ==
- List of male mixed martial artists
