= Yuki Nakai =

Japanese mixed martial artist

Yuki Nakai 中井祐樹
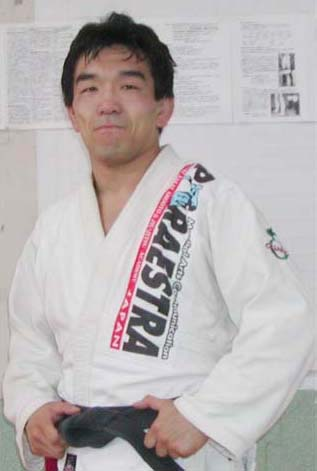
- Born: August 18, 1970 (age 56); Hamamasu Village, Hokkaidō, Japan
- Height: 5 ft 6 in (1.68 m)
- Weight: 154 lb (70 kg; 11.0 st)
- Style: Shootfighting, Judo, Wrestling
- Fighting out of: Tokyo, Japan
- Team: Paraestra
- Teachers: Kanae Hirata; Satoru Sayama
- Rank: A-Class Shootist; Black belt in Brazilian Jiu-Jitsu under Carlos Gracie Jr. Black belt in Kosen Judo
- Years active: 1993–1995 (MMA)

Mixed martial arts record
- Total: 12
- Wins: 9
- By submission: 7
- By decision: 1
- Unknown: 1
- Losses: 2
- By submission: 1
- By decision: 1
- Draws: 1

Other information
- Notable students: Shinya Aoki
- Mixed martial arts record from Sherdog

Yuki Nakai (born 18 August 1970, Japanese: 中井祐樹) is a retired Japanese mixed martial artist. He currently teaches Shootfighting and Brazilian Jiu-Jitsu, and is the president of the Japanese Confederation of Jiu-Jitsu.

He competed in Shooto, an early MMA promotion where he won the Shooto World Welterweight Championship, as well as Vale Tudo Japan 1995, where he was outweighed by every opponent in the tournament. Despite this, and despite suffering a severe eye injury in the first bout, Nakai managed to make it to the finals where he lost to Rickson Gracie. Nakai is considered a legend of Shooto by many fighters and fans.

He is the founder of the Paraestra Shooto Gym and coaches fighters such as PRIDE and DREAM stand out Shinya Aoki, who also earned his A-Class Shooto rank and jiu-jitsu black belt from Nakai.

== Career ==
Nakai started training Judo and Wrestling at Hokkaido Sapporo North high school, originally with the dream to be a professional wrestler. After entering Hokkaido University, he started training under renowned Kodokan master Kanae Hirata. In his fourth year, now as a black belt, Nakai competed at the Nanatei Judo championship, leading his university to the victory in 1992. At the same time, he joined the amateur division of mixed martial arts promotion Shooto, training under Satoru Sayama at the Super Tiger Gym. When Nakai graduated from college, he joined Shooto as a professional.

=== Shooto ===
Nakai made his MMA debut with a 53-second victory by keylock over Hiroki Noritsugu. He would follow with another win, submitting Masakazu Kuramochi via heel hook, but he was stopped short by Noboru Asahi in a decision loss. Still, Nakai recovered with two victories over Jun Kikuwada, both at the Seishinkaikan event representing Shooto and at a proper Shooto event, and another over Kyuhei Ueno by choke. In 1994, Nakai took part in the Vale Tudo Access series of events and fought Brazilian Jiu-Jitsu exponent and Rickson Gracie student Arthur Cathiard in the first of them, getting a draw after an uneventful bout spent at Yuki's guard. Nakai, however, had acquired momentum, and he defeated standout Kazuhiro Kusayanagi for the Shooto Welterweight Championship shortly after. Then, starting 1995, he was chosen again to represent Shooto in Sayama's Vale Tudo Japan event.

=== Vale Tudo Japan ===
On April 20, 1995, Nakai entered the Vale Tudo Japan tournament, figuring at 135 lbs as the lightest competitor of the night. His first opponent would be the Dutch Savateur and Ultimate Fighting Championship finalist Gerard Gordeau. At the start of the match, Nakai immediately rushed his opponent with a takedown attempt, but Gordeau used the ropes to keep himself standing and punched Nakai's head, and they remained entangled on them for the rest of the first round. At the second, the Japanese dropped down and initiated a heel hook entry, only for Gordeau to clamp himself to the ropes again and land strikes on his supine opponent, eye-gouging him illegally several times. Restarted on the center of the ring, a bloody and half-blinded Nakai was forced to lie down on the mat while he and Gordeau probed each other from their respective positions. Finally, after a third round passed on the ropes, Nakai scored a double leg takedown against the ring corner, escaped from a guillotine choke attempt by Gordeau and dropped down for another heel hook, this time managing to submit the Dutchman after half an hour of fighting.

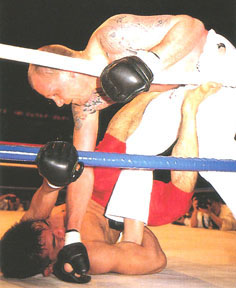
Nakai attempting a heel hook against Gordeau.

Despite his right eye being gravely injured and having lost half of his eyesight, Nakai advanced round in the tournament and went to the ring to fight against American Wrestler Craig Pittman, who sported a full 100-lb weight advantage. The bigger fighter took him down and landed heavy ground and pound near the ropes while Nakai tried repeatedly for armbars from the bottom. Pittman continued his assault on the center of the ring, but Nakai fended him off with a usage of both butterfly and spider guard. In the second round, Nakai dropped to the ground and resumed trying to submit Pittman from his guard, which he finally accomplished with an armbar at 7:32 of the round.

Now with both of his eyes swollen shut from the punishment and almost totally blind, Yuki would go on to face jiu-jitsu expert Rickson Gracie in the third and final bout of the tournament. Nakai resisted Rickson's earlier attempts of achieving dominant position, but he was too lacerated to keep up his defense and eventually Gracie took the side control. The Brazilian advanced to a cradle position and followed by taking full mount, from where he landed some punches before catching Yuki in a rear naked choke for the tap out, thus winning the tournament. Due to Gordeau's illegal tactics and Nakai's own refusal to get medical attention in order to continue in the tournament, he became permanently blind in his right eye. which forced him to retire from mixed martial arts competition. For years he and Sayama kept his blindness a secret to protect the reputation of the sport.

=== Post-MMA ===
After retiring from MMA, Nakai became interested in Brazilian Jiu-Jitsu, not due to his own defeat to Rickson as it is popularly believed, but to Noboru Asahi's loss to Royler Gracie in 1996. He learned it from Enson Inoue, and a year later he participated in his first jiu-jitsu tournament, the Gracie Honolulu Open hosted by Relson Gracie. Nakai soon won the Pan American Championship on the Brown Belt category, and afterwards he was granted the Black Belt by Carlos Gracie Jr, becoming the first person from Japan to hold a Black Belt in BJJ. In 1997, Nakai opened the Paraestra Shooto Gym, and was eventually appointed president of the Japanese Confederation of Jiu-Jitsu.

== Championships and accomplishments ==
- Shooto
  - Shooto Welterweight Championship (one time; former)

== Mixed martial arts record ==
Professional record breakdown
| 11 matches | 9 wins | 2 losses |
| By submission | 7 | 1 |
| By decision | 1 | 1 |
| Unknown | 1 | 0 |

| Res. | Record | Opponent | Method | Event | Date | Round | Time | Location | Notes |
|---|---|---|---|---|---|---|---|---|---|
| Loss | 9–2–1 | Rickson Gracie | Submission (rear-naked choke) | Vale Tudo Japan 1995 | April 20, 1995 | 1 | 6:22 | Tokyo, Japan | |
| Win | 9–1–1 | Craig Pittman | Submission (armbar) | Vale Tudo Japan 1995 | April 20, 1995 | 2 | 7:32 | Tokyo, Japan | |
| Win | 8–1–1 | Gerard Gordeau | Submission (heel hook) | Vale Tudo Japan 1995 | April 20, 1995 | 4 | 2:41 | Tokyo, Japan | |
| Win | 7–1–1 | Hiraoki Matsutani | Submission (heel hook) | Shooto - Vale Tudo Access 3 | January 21, 1995 | 1 | 0:20 | Tokyo, Japan | |
| Win | 6–1–1 | Kazuhiro Kusayanagi | Decision (unanimous) | Shooto - Vale Tudo Access 2 | November 7, 1994 | 4 | 4:00 | Tokyo, Japan | Won the Shooto Welterweight Championship. |
| Draw | 6–1–1 | Arthur Cathiard | Draw | Shooto - Vale Tudo Access | September 26, 1994 | 3 | 8:00 | Tokyo, Japan | |
| Win | 5–1 | Kyuhei Ueno | Submission (arm-triangle choke) | Shooto - Shooto | May 6, 1994 | 5 | 0:52 | Tokyo, Japan | |
| Win | 4–1 | Jun Kikawada | Submission (heel hook) | Shooto - New Stage Battle of Wrestling | March 11, 1994 | 1 | 0:27 | Tokyo, Japan | |
| Win | 3–1 | Jun Kikawada | N/A | Seishinkaikan | February 23, 1994 | N/A | N/A | Japan | |
| Loss | 2–1 | Noboru Asahi | Decision (unanimous) | Shooto - Shooto | November 25, 1993 | 5 | 3:00 | Tokyo, Japan | |
| Win | 2–0 | Masakazu Kuramochi | Submission (heel hook) | Shooto - Shooto | June 24, 1993 | 2 | 1:36 | Tokyo, Japan | |
| Win | 1–0 | Hiroki Noritsugi | Submission (kimura) | Shooto - Shooto | April 26, 1993 | 1 | 0:53 | Tokyo, Japan | |

== Submission grappling record ==
Professional record breakdown
| 13 matches | 4 wins | 7 losses |
| By submission | 0 | 3 |
| By decision | 4 | 4 |
| Draws | 2 | |

| Result | Opponent | Method | Event | Date | Round | Time | Notes |
|---|---|---|---|---|---|---|---|
| Loss | (Brazil) Roberto de Souza | Submission (triangle choke) | Rizin 21 – Hamamatsu | 2020 | 1 | 3:38 | |
| Draw | (Brazil) Ricardo de la Riva | Draw | Ground Impact Revival | 2013 | | | |
| Win | (Brazil) Ricardo de la Riva | Points | Professional Jiu Ground Impact 05 | 2004 | | | |
| Loss | (Brazil) Mario Reis | Points | Professional Jiu DESAFIO 02 | 2004 | | | |
| Loss | (Japan) Mitsuyoshi Hayakawa | Points | Professional Jiu Ground Impact 04 | 2004 | | | |
| Win | (United States) Albert Crane | Points | Professional Jiu Ground Impact 03 | 2004 | | | |
| Loss | (Brazil) Alexandre “Soca” Freitas | Points | Professional Jiu Ground Impact 02 | 2003 | | | |
| Loss | (Brazil) Leonardo Vieira | Submission (rear-naked choke) | Professional Jiu GI um Ground Impact | 2002 | | | |
| Loss | (Brazil) Vítor Ribeiro | Points | Vale Tudo Japan '99 | 1999 | | | |
| Win | (Japan) Tsutomu Fujimoto | Points | Daido-Juku THE WARS V | 1999 | | | |
| Win | (Japan) Masato Fujiwara | Points | Daido-Juku THE WARS IV | 1997 | | | |
| Draw | (Japan) Kazuya Abe | Draw | KP X WK: Koppo vs. Keisyukai | 1996 | | | |
| Loss | (Brazil) Jean-Jacques Machado | Submission (triangle choke) | Shooto: Vale Tudo Perception | 1995 | | | |

== See also ==
- List of Brazilian Jiu-Jitsu practitioners
