= Brendon Ryan Barrett =

American actor and acting coach

- Born: August 5, 1986 (age 40); Roseville, California, U.S.
- Occupations: Actor; acting coach
- Years active: 1994–present

Brendon Ryan Barrett (born August 5, 1986) is an American actor and acting coach.

== Early life and career ==
Barrett was born in Roseville, California, and he grew up in Folsom.

He co-starred in The Shadow Men, which was premiered at Cannes Film Festival in 1997. He was also the voice of Casper the Friendly Ghost in Casper's Haunted Christmas, and he played Chris Carson, the best friend of Casper the Friendly Ghost in the 1997 film Casper: A Spirited Beginning. Brendon graduated from Folsom High School in 2004 and attended Sacramento State University where he graduated with a double major in Communications and Criminal Justice. From 2007 to 2010, Barrett taught monologue and television 1 lessons at the John Robert Powers Agency.

In November 1998, Barrett acted in the television film Logan's War: Bound by Honor. It premiered on CBS, starring Chuck Norris and Eddie Cibrian. In it, Barrett plays a child who witnesses the murder of his family.

== Awards ==
Brendon Barrett was nominated for a Young Artist award for Best Performance in a TV / Pilot / Mini-Series: Leading Young Actor for Logan's War: Bound By Honor.

== Filmography ==
=== Film ===
Year	Title	Role	Notes
1997	Casper: A Spirited Beginning	Chris Carson	Direct-to-video
1997	The Shadow Men	Andy Wilson	
1999	Durango Kids	Taylor	
2000	Boys and Girls	Young Ryan Walker	
2000	Casper's Haunted Christmas	Casper	Direct-to-video
2001	Lloyd	Troy	

=== Television ===
Year	Title	Role	Notes
1995	Stolen Innocence	Johnny Sapp	Television film
1997–1998	Soul Man	Andy Weber	25 episodes
1998	Touched by an Angel	Cameron Mancuso	Episode: "Only Connect"
1998	Logan's War: Bound by Honor	Logan Fallon (Age 10)	Television film
1999	Caroline in the City	Stan	Episode: "Caroline and the Horny Kid"
1999	Two of a Kind	Ethan Killion	2 episodes
2000	The King of Queens	Jason	Episode: "Big Dougie"
2001	What's Up, Peter Fuddy?		Television film
2013–2015	Pac-Man and the Ghostly Adventures	Specter	3 episodes
