= 1994 in Shooto =

Mixed martial arts events

Information
- First date: January 14, 1994
- Last date: November 7, 1994

Events
- Total events: 6

Fights
- Total fights: 26
- Title fights: 1

Chronology
1993 in Shooto	1994 in Shooto	1995 in Shooto

The year 1994 is the 6th year in the history of Shooto, a mixed martial arts promotion based in the Japan. In 1994 Shooto held 6 events beginning with, Shooto: Shooto.

== Title fights ==
Title fights in 1994
Weight class				Method	Round	Time	Event	Notes
Lightweight	Yuki Nakai	def.	Kazuhiro Kusayanagi	Decision (Unanimous)	4	4:00	Shooto: Vale Tudo Access 2	(Note: Nakai defeated Kusayanagi to become the Shooto Lightweight Champion.)

== Events list ==
#	Event Title	Date	Arena	Location
31	Shooto: Vale Tudo Access 2	November 7, 1994	Korakuen Hall	Tokyo, Japan
30	Shooto: Vale Tudo Access 1	September 26, 1994	Korakuen Hall	Tokyo, Japan
29	Shooto: Shooto	May 6, 1994	Korakuen Hall	Tokyo, Japan
28	Shooto: Shooto	March 18, 1994	Korakuen Hall	Tokyo, Japan
27	Shooto: New Stage Battle of Wrestling	March 11, 1994	Korakuen Hall	Tokyo, Japan
26	Shooto: Shooto	January 14, 1994	Korakuen Hall	Tokyo, Japan

== Shooto: Shooto ==
Shooto: Shooto was an event held on January 14, 1994, at Korakuen Hall in Tokyo, Japan.

=== Results ===
Main Card
Weight class				Method	Round	Time	Notes
	Mamoru Okochi	def.	Tadashi Murakami	Decision (Unanimous)	5	3:00
	Kyuhei Ueno	def.	Hiroshi Yoshida	Submission (Armbar)	3	1:40
	Takeshi Miyanaga	def.	Jun Kanetaka	Submission (Heel Hook)	1	2:23

== Shooto: New Stage Battle of Wrestling ==
Shooto: New Stage Battle of Wrestling was an event held on March 11, 1994, at Korakuen Hall in Tokyo, Japan.

=== Results ===
Main Card
Weight class				Method	Round	Time	Notes
	Yuki Nakai	def.	Jun Kikawada	Submission (Heel Hook)	1	0:27

== Shooto: Shooto ==
Shooto: Shooto was an event held on March 18, 1994, at Korakuen Hall in Tokyo, Japan.

=== Results ===
Main Card
Weight class				Method	Round	Time	Notes
	Kenji Kawaguchi	def.	Tomokazu Fukaya	Submission (Kneebar)	1	0:32
	Yasunori Okuda	def.	Yuji Fujita	Submission (Armbar)	1	0:25
	Kyuhei Ueno	def.	Yoshihiko Abe	KO	1	1:48
	Takashi Nishizawa	def.	Seiichi Tsurusaki	KO	1	0:53

== Shooto: Shooto ==
Shooto: Shooto was an event held on May 6, 1994, at Korakuen Hall in Tokyo, Japan.

=== Results ===
Main Card
Weight class				Method	Round	Time	Notes
	Kenji Kawaguchi	def.	Yasunori Okuda	Submission (Guillotine Choke)	1	2:55
	Naoki Sakurada	def.	Yuji Hashiguchi	KO	3	1:18
	Kazuhiro Sakamoto	def.	Akbar Talei	Submission (Kimura)	1	2:35
	Noboru Asahi	def.	Shinji Abe	Submission (Rear-Naked Choke)	1	0:41
	Yuki Nakai	def.	Kyuhei Ueno	Submission (Arm-Triangle Choke)	5	0:32
	Mamoru Okochi	def.	Tomoyuki Saito	Submission (Armbar)	1	2:43
	Eiji Mizuno	def.	Misaki Kubota	Decision (Unanimous)	3	3:00

== Shooto: Vale Tudo Access 1 ==
Shooto: Vale Tudo Access 1 was an event held on September 26, 1994, at Korakuen Hall in Tokyo, Japan.

=== Results ===
Main Card
Weight class				Method	Round	Time	Notes
	Naoki Sakurada	def.	Kotaro Shimamoto	Decision (Unanimous)	5	3:00
	Noboru Asahi	def.	Nozomu Matsumoto	Submission (Kimura)	1	0:13
	Kenichi Tanaka	def.	Mamoru Okochi	Submission (Arm-Triangle Choke)	1	2:51
	Masato Suzuki	def.	Masahiro Oishi	Submission (Armbar)	2	0:43
	Hiroyuki Kanno	def.	Hiroshi Yoshida	Decision (Unanimous)	3	3:00

== Shooto: Vale Tudo Access 2 ==
Shooto: Vale Tudo Access 2 was an event held on November 7, 1994, at Korakuen Hall in Tokyo, Japan.

=== Results ===
Main Card
Weight class				Method	Round	Time	Notes
	Erik Paulson	def.	Kenji Kawaguchi	Technical Submission (Armbar)	2	1:03
Lightweight	Yuki Nakai	def.	Kazuhiro Kusayanagi	Decision (Unanimous)	4	4:00	(Note: Nakai defeated Kusayanagi to become the Shooto Lightweight Champion.)
	Noboru Asahi	def.	Kyuhei Ueno	Decision (Unanimous)	5	3:00
	Hiroaki Matsutani	def.	Katsuaki Yano	Decision (Unanimous)	3	3:00
	Rumina Sato	def.	Michael McAuliffe	Submission (Calf Slicer)	2	2:18
	Magnum Kawamura	def.	Masataka Kawakami	Submission (Armbar)	2	1:32

== See also ==
- Shooto
- List of Shooto champions
- List of Shooto Events
