= The Shadow Men (1997 film) =

- Directed by: Timothy Bond
- Screenplay by: Justin Stanley; Eric Miller
- Produced by: Steve Beswick
- Starring: Eric Roberts; Sherilyn Fenn; Dean Stockwell; Brendan Ryan Barrett
- Cinematography: Frank Byers
- Edited by: Barry Zetlin
- Music by: Todd Hayen
- Production company: Encounter Productions
- Distributed by: Xenon Pictures
- Release date: September 16, 1997
- Running time: 95 minutes
- Country: United States
- Language: English

The Shadow Men is a 1997 science-fiction thriller directed by Timothy Bond, and starring Eric Roberts, Sherilyn Fenn, Dean Stockwell and Brendan Ryan Barrett.

== Plot ==
A married couple, Bob and Dez Wilson, and their 12-year-old son Andy are being accosted by a blinding light when driving home from a daytrip. They wake up a couple of hours later seemingly unscathed but soon experience recurring nightmares.

It seems that they have been abducted by aliens, as is later proved by their son's Andy's handycam that had suddenly started running right after the incident. This is also discovered by mysterious Men In Black who start nagging the family up to the point of threatening to kill them. As they are laughed at by the police they seek refuge at SciFi-writer Stan Mills' house and start fighting back.

== Reception ==
"In contrast to the glossy comedy Men in Black that came out the same year, The Shadow Men is a relatively serious depiction of the legendary conspirators", according to The Encyclopedia of Science Fiction online.

== Cast ==
- Eric Roberts as Bob Wilson
- Sherilyn Fenn as Dez Wilson
- Dean Stockwell as Stan Mills
- Brendan Ryan Barrett as Andy Wilson
- Andrew Prine as MIB #1
- Chris McCarty as MIB #2
- Tom Poster as MIB #3
- Valerie Swift as Jane
- Lisa Dinkins as the police desk sergeant
