= Misaki Kubota =

American martial artist

Misaki Kubota 久保田美咲
- Born: Japan
- Nationality: Japanese
- Years active: 1991 - 1994

Mixed martial arts record
- Total: 3
- Wins: 0
- Losses: 2
- By decision: 2
- Draws: 1

Other information
- Mixed martial arts record from Sherdog

Misaki Kubota Japanese: 久保田美咲 is a Japanese mixed martial artist.

== Mixed martial arts record ==
Professional record breakdown
3 matches	0 wins	2 losses
By decision	0	2
Draws	1	

Res.	Record	Opponent	Method	Event	Date	Round	Time	Location	Notes
Loss	0–2–1	Eiji Mizuno	Decision (unanimous)	Shooto - Shooto	May 6, 1994	3	3:00	Tokyo, Japan	
Draw	0–1–1	Kenji Ogusu	Draw	Shooto - Shooto	May 29, 1992	3	3:00	Tokyo, Japan	
Loss	0–1	Mamoru Okochi	Decision (unanimous)	Shooto - Shooto	May 31, 1991	3	3:00	Tokyo, Japan	

== See also ==
- List of male mixed martial artists
