= Harrison Young =

American actor (1930–2005)

- Young in Saving Private Ryan (1998)
- Born: Harrison Richard Young; March 13, 1930; Port Huron, Michigan, U.S.
- Died: July 3, 2005 (aged 75); Los Angeles, California, U.S.
- Occupation: Actor
- Years active: 1976, 1991–2005

Harrison Richard Young (March 13, 1930 – July 3, 2005) was an American character actor. He is best known for playing the elderly James Ryan in Saving Private Ryan.

== Biography ==
Born in 1930 in Port Huron, Michigan, Harrison briefly served in the United States Army during the Korean War before being discharged at the rank of second lieutenant. Beginning his acting career at the Port Huron Little Theater, he moved to New York in 1973 and went on to play the lead role in the play Short Eyes (1974) in Broadway.

Young gained recognition for his role as the elderly Private James Ryan in Steven Spielberg's war epic Saving Private Ryan (1998). Having starred in over 100 films and television episodes, Young's other credits include Passions, CSI: Crime Scene Investigation and Rob Zombie's House of 1000 Corpses.

Harrison and his wife Denise had three daughters. He died on July 3, 2005, in Los Angeles at the age of 75 and was buried at Woodland Cemetery in Port Huron.

== Filmography ==
- 1991: Down Home (TV Series) as Lenny
- 1991: Reasonable Doubts (TV Series) as Drunk
- 1992: Waxwork II: Lost in Time as James Westbourne
- 1992: Guncrazy as Mr. Hickok, Howard's Dad
- 1992: A Child Lost Forever: The Jerry Sherwood Story (TV Movie) as Neighbor
- 1993: The Micronots! (TV Series) as Montgomery
- 1994: Marilyn, My Love
- 1995: ER (TV Series) as Parmelli
- 1996: Erotic Confessions (TV Series) as Roger Goodman, Department Store Owner
- 1996: Humanoids from the Deep (TV Movie) as Sergeant
- 1996: Children of the Corn IV: The Gathering (Video) as Drifter
- 1996: Ned and Stacey (TV Series) as Mr. Palmer
- 1996: Boston Common (TV Series) as Homeless Man
- 1997: The Night That Never Happened as Dad
- 1997: Click (TV Series) as Senator Gyrgich
- 1997: Butterscotch (TV Series) as Smiley
- 1997: True Vengeance (Video) as Sam Brown
- 1997: Law & Order (TV Series) as Gus
- 1997: Melrose Place (TV Series) as Drunk
- 1997: The Game as Obsequious Executive
- 1997: Total Security (TV Series) as Waiter #1
- 1997: Expose as Councilman Kaye
- 1997: Madam Savant as County Judge
- 1998: Second Skin
- 1998: Running Woman as Old Man
- 1998: The Opposite of Sex as Medical Examiner
- 1998: How to Make the Cruelest Month as Helpful Drunk
- 1998: Primary Colors as Sam
- 1998: Champions as Senator Able
- 1998: Saving Private Ryan as Old James Ryan
- 1998: Buffy the Vampire Slayer (TV Series) as Old Man
- 1998: Beverly Hills, 90210 (TV Series) as Grandpa Ed Taylor
- 1999: Blast from the Past as Bum
- 1999: Sliders (1 episode) as Henry Nichols
- 1999: Sabrina, the Teenage Witch (TV Series) as Vagrant
- 1999: Yonggary as Dr. Wendel Hughes
- 1999: Work with Me (TV Series) as Sullivan
- 1999: Durango Kids as Uncle Gus
- 1999: Witness Protection (TV Movie) as Mr. O'Connor, Cindy's Father
- 1999: Ugly Naked People Bob, Tour Guide
- 2000: Providence (TV Series) as Monroe Ellison
- 2000: The Adventures of Rocky and Bullwinkle as General Foods
- 2000: Crocodile (Video) as Sheriff Bowman
- 2000: CSI: Crime Scene Investigation (TV Series) as Judge Cohen
- 2000: Starforce as Wizened Council Member
- 2000: The Norm Show (TV Series) as Simon
- 2000: The Beach Boys: An American Family (TV Mini-Series) as Buddy Wilson
- 2000: Blue Shark Hash as Captain Jack
- 2001: Passions (TV Series) as Palmer Harper
- 2001: The Korean War (TV Series) as President Eisenhower
- 2001: Red as Kidnapper
- 2001: The West Wing (TV Series) as Senator Grissom
- 2002: Sopranos S4E3 Old Doctor on commercial on TV
- 2002: 7th Heaven (TV Series) as Frank
- 2002: Bubba Ho-tep as Elvis' Roommate
- 2002: Demon Under Glass (Video) as James Conroy
- 2002: Trance as Henry Santorini
- 2002: Ken Park as Tate's Grandfather
- 2002: Hi Frank! (Chinese movie) as Frank
- 2003: The Lyon's Den (TV Series) as Mr. Fenderson
- 2003: House of 1000 Corpses as Don Willis
- 2003: The Last Cowboy (TV Movie) as Preacher
- 2003: First Watch as CIA Director
- 2004: Green Arrow Fan Film as Kyle Magnor
- 2005: One More Round as Mr. Rexosovich
- 2005: Inheritance as Grandfather
- 2005: Kiss Kiss Bang Bang as Harmony's Dad
- 2006: The Pleasure Drivers as John
- 2006: Cracking Up (TV Series) as Bob Briscoe
- 2008: The Flyboys as Grandpa Thomas (final film role)
