= Satoshi Fukuoka =

Japanese mixed martial artist

Satoshi Fukuoka 福岡聡
- Born: Japan
- Nationality: Japanese
- Years active: 1992 - 1995

Mixed martial arts record
- Total: 3
- Wins: 0
- Losses: 2
- By submission: 2
- Draws: 1

Other information
- Mixed martial arts record from Sherdog

Satoshi Fukuoka (Japanese: 福岡聡) is a Japanese mixed martial artist. He competed in the Middleweight division.

== Mixed martial arts record ==
Professional record breakdown
3 matches	0 wins	2 losses
By submission	0	2
Draws	1	

Res.	Record	Opponent	Method	Event	Date	Round	Time	Location	Notes
Loss	0-2-1	Mamoru Okochi	Technical Submission (triangle choke)	Shooto - Vale Tudo Access 3	January 21, 1995	1	1:02	Tokyo, Japan	
Loss	0-1-1	Kenji Ogusu	Submission (kneebar)	Shooto - Shooto	November 25, 1993	3	2:52	Tokyo, Japan	
Draw	0-0-1	Takeshi Miyanaga	Draw	Shooto - Shooto	November 27, 1992	3	3:00	Tokyo, Japan	

== See also ==
- List of male mixed martial artists
