= Ready for Love (TV series) =

- Genre: Matchmaking
- Directed by: Alex Rudzinski
- Presented by: Giuliana Rancic; Bill Rancic
- Starring: Tracy McMillan; Amber Kelleher-Andrews; Matthew Hussey
- Theme music composer: Amy Stroup
- Opening theme: "Hold Onto Hope Love"
- Ending theme: "Hold Onto Hope Love"
- Country of origin: United States
- Original language: English
- No. of seasons: 1
- No. of episodes: 9

Production
- Executive producers: David Garfinkle; Eva Longoria; Greg Goldman; Jason Ehrlich; Jay Renfroe
- Production companies: Renegade 83 Entertainment; UnbeliEVAble Entertainment; Universal Television

Original release
- Network: NBC; NBC.com & Hulu
- Release: April 9 – June 4, 2013

Ready for Love is an American reality matchmaking competition television series that aired for three weeks on NBC in 2013 and six subsequent weeks on NBC.com. The series was scheduled to air Tuesdays from 9:00pm to 11:00pm Eastern and Pacific time, and premiered in that slot on Tuesday, April 9, 2013. It was hosted by Giuliana Rancic and Bill Rancic. The show featured three bachelors and includes three matchmakers and a field of 36 bachelorettes.

On April 19, 2013, after two low-rated episodes, NBC pulled the Eva Longoria produced Ready for Love from its schedule. The last episode to air on NBC was the April 23 segment. The remaining six episodes were placed online on Tuesdays via the network's website, Hulu, the network's cable video on demand service, and iTunes and Amazon Video for purchase, until the June 4 finale.

== Programming ==
Episodes of Ready for Love run for two hours, and the series debuted on April 9, 2013. It was placed on the Tuesday schedule where it aired immediately after The Voice. It had originally been planned for a Sunday night slot as the lead-in to The Apprentice before NBC reshuffled its spring 2013 schedule; the Tuesday time slot was regarded as an upgrade because The Voice is a strong lead-in, and the network hoped the show would attract the viewers who had previously watched The Bachelor on Tuesdays.

== Show structure ==
The show was a matchmaking show with the goal of finding romantic partners for three eligible bachelors. Producer Eva Longoria selected the bachelors for the show: Dallas-based financier Ben Patton, Santa Barbara-based Plain White T's member Tim Lopez and Miami-based entrepreneur Ernesto Argüello. Eligible women applied online to matchmakers Amber Kelleher-Andrews, Tracy McMillan and Matthew Hussey. Each of the three bachelors had a field of twelve bachelorettes that were chosen for him: each matchmaker selected four women per bachelor. The women applied via a specially designed Facebook app that introduced the participants via a Ready For Love Facebook page as well as a Facebook timeline. The intent was that as the season evolved, each of the three bachelors would find a romantic partner from among the twelve bachelorettes chosen for him while the audience observed the process.

== Contestants ==
Name	Age	Residence	Eliminated
Shandi Finnessey	34	Los Angeles, CA	Winner (Ernesto's Pick)
Jenna Reeves	23	Austin, TX	Winner (Tim's Pick)
Angela Zatopek	24	Houston, TX	Winner (Ben's Pick)
Sara Lavagnino	30	Franklin, TN	Finale
Allie Wagner	26	Cincinnati, OH	Finale
Hailey Clark	31	Indialantic, FL	Episode 8
Tarynn Franco	26	San Francisco, CA	Episode 8
Alba Reyes	30	Houston, TX	Episode 8
Kristen Sikorski	25	Austin, TX	Episode 8
Siham Bengoua	25	Philadelphia, PA	Episode 7
Renae Virata	31	Houston, TX	Episode 7
Mandy Wagner	26	Studio City, CA	Episode 7
Sarah Moore	28	Charlotte, NC	Episode 6
Beth Richman	30	Charlotte, NC	Episode 6
Danielle Duff	27	Tucson, AZ	Episode 5
Erica Larson	25	Addison, TX	Episode 5
Kari Krakowski	27	Dallas, TX	Episode 5
Christina Rigaud	25	New Orleans, LA	Episode 4
Sonia Lettig	31	Miramar, FL	Episode 4
Lynsee Gonzales	26	Portland, OR	Episode 4
Katie Coyle	34	Pella, IA	Episode 3
Taonaya Fleury	31	Miramar, FL	Episode 3
Olivia Matti	26	Sterling Heights, MI	Episode 3 (Quit)
Katie Crosby	26	Chicago, IL	Episode 3
Victoria Mora	24	Chicago, IL	Episode 2
Rachel Briese	26	Schaumburg, IL	Episode 2
Lisa Marie Hall	30	Covina, CA	Episode 2
Kristina Zapata	26	Los Angeles, CA	Episode 2
Summer Burns	31	Austin, TX	Episode 2
Jade Dhir	24	Austin, TX	Episode 2
Elizabeth Capela	30	Dallas, TX	Episode 2
Seneca Berniard	34	Los Angeles, CA	Episode 2
Leah Trogan	27	Austin, TX	Episode 1
Lana Sears	26	Kansas City, MO	Episode 1
Alexis Rodriguez	23	Scottsdale, AZ	Episode 1
Lisa Conlon	32	Vernon, CT	Episode 1

== Elimination chart ==
Tim's Women											Ernesto's Women											Ben's Women										
Place	Contestant	Episodes									Place	Contestant	Episodes									Place	Contestant	Episodes								
Place	Contestant	1		3	4	5	6	7	8	Finale	Place	Contestant	2		3	4	5	6	7	8	Finale	Place	Contestant	2		3	4	5	6	7	8	Finale
1	Jenna Reeves	In	In	In	In	In	In	Btm 2	Btm 3	Winner	1	Shandi Finnessey	In	In	In	Btm 2	In	In	In	Winner		1	Angela Zatopek	In	Saved	In	In	In	In	In	In	Winner
2	Sara Lavagnino	In	In	In	Btm 2	In	In	In	Btm 3	Out	3	Alba Reyes	In	In	In	In	In	In	In	Out		2	Allie Wagner	In	In	In	In	Btm 2	In	Btm 2	Btm 2	Out
3	Hailey Clark	In	Saved	Btm 3	In	Btm 2	In	In	Out		3	Kristen Sikorski	In	Saved	In	In	Btm 2	In	Btm 2	Out		3	Tarryn Franco	In	In	Saved	In	In	Btm 2	In	Out	
4	Siham Bengoua	In	In	In	In	In	Btm 2	Out			4	Mandy Wagner	In	In	Saved	In	In	In	Out			4	Renae Virata	In	In	In	Btm 2	In	In	Out		
5	Sarah Moore	In	Btm 3	In	In	In	Out				5	Erica Larson	In	Btm 3	Btm 3	In	Out					5	Beth Richman	In	In	Btm 3	In	In	Out			
6	Danielle Duff	In	In	In	In	Out					6	Sonia Lettig	In	In	In	Out						6	Kari Krakowski	In	Btm 3	In	In	Out				
7	Christina Rigaud	In	In	Saved	Out						7	Katie Crosby	In	In	Out							7	Lynsee Gonzales	In	In	In	Out					
8	Taonaya Fleury	In	In	Out							8	Olivia Matti	In	In	Quit							8	Katie Coyle	In	In	Out						
9	Leah Trogan	In	Out								9	Victoria Mora	In	Out								9	Rachel Briese	In	Out							
10-12	Lana Sears	Out									10-12	Lisa Marie Hall	Out									10-12	Kristina Zapata	Out								
10-12	Alexis Rodriguez	Out									10-12	Summer Burns	Out									10-12	Jade Dhir	Out								
10-12	Lisa Conlon	Out									10-12	Elizabeth Capela	Out									10-12	Seneca Berniard	Out								

=== Key ===
Matchmaker Matthew Hussey's team.
Matchmaker Amber Kelleher-Andrews' team.
Matchmaker Tracy McMillan's team.

Winner The contestant won the competition.
In The contestant did well enough to not be put in the Bottom 3 or Bottom 2.
Saved The contestant was in the Bottom 3, but was saved.
Btm 3 The contestant was chosen by the Matchmakers to be in the Bottom 3.
Btm 2 The contestant was chosen by the Matchmakers to be in the Bottom 2.
Btm 2 or 3 The contestant was chosen by the Men to be in the Bottom 2 or 3.
Out The contestant was eliminated.

== Reception ==
Sonia Saraiya of The A.V. Club gave the premiere episode an "F" grade, calling it "a catastrophe of a television show", "pure evil", "boring, superficial, and bland" and its treatment of the contestants "despicable".

== Ratings ==
Despite aggressive promotion and having The Voice as a lead-in, its premiere only brought in 3.67 million viewers with a 1.5 rating. In terms of viewership, only 27.6% of its lead-in stayed to watch it. In terms of the 18–49 category, it only retained 34.1% of its lead in.

=== Episodes ===
No.	Title	Original release date	U.S. viewers (millions)
1	"A Rockstar Search for Love"	April 9, 2013	3.67
2	"Meet Ben and Ernesto"	April 16, 2013	3.20
3	"Love Connections"	April 23, 2013	2.86
4	"A Vineyard, a Trivia Contest and a Food Fight, Parts 1 & 2"	April 30, 2013 (NBC.com)	N/A
5	"Vegas, In Love and War"	May 7, 2013 (NBC.com)	N/A
6	"Love In Paradise"	May 14, 2013 (NBC.com)	N/A
7	"Meet The Parents"	May 21, 2013 (NBC.com)	N/A
8	"Ernesto Finds Love"	May 28, 2013 (NBC.com)	N/A
9	"An Engagement and a Song"	June 4, 2013 (NBC.com)	N/A

== International airing ==
- Australia - The series premiered in Australia on Channel Seven on December 27, on a Saturday afternoon at 12:30pm
- South Africa - The series premiered in South Africa on SABC 3 (South African Broadcasting Corporation) on 8 April 2020, airing Wednesday evening 19:30pm
