= Masaya Onodera =

Japanese mixed martial artist

Masaya Onodera 小野寺正也
- Born: Japan
- Nationality: Japanese
- Years active: 1992 - 1993

Mixed martial arts record
- Total: 3
- Wins: 1
- By knockout: 1
- Losses: 1
- By submission: 1
- Draws: 1

Other information
- Mixed martial arts record from Sherdog

Masaya Onodera Japanese: 小野寺正也 is a Japanese mixed martial artist.

== Mixed martial arts record ==
Professional record breakdown
3 matches	1 win	1 loss
By knockout	1	0
By submission	0	1
Draws	1	

Res.	Record	Opponent	Method	Event	Date	Round	Time	Location	Notes
Loss	1-1-1	Hiroyuki Kanno	Submission (armbar)	Shooto - Shooto	April 26, 1993	2	2:31	Tokyo, Japan	
Draw	1-0-1	Masato Suzuki	Draw	Shooto - Shooto	September 25, 1992	3	3:00	Tokyo, Japan	
Win	1-0	Keiichi Motomura	KO	Shooto - Shooto	May 29, 1992	2	0:00	Tokyo, Japan	

== See also ==
- List of male mixed martial artists
