= Bloodsport 4: The Dark Kumite =

- Promotional release poster
- Directed by: Elvis Restaino
- Written by: George Saunders
- Produced by: Alan Mehrez
- Starring: Daniel Bernhardt; Stefanos Miltsakakis; Michael Krawic; Derek McGrath; Lisa Stothard
- Cinematography: George Mooradian
- Edited by: Frank Sacco
- Music by: Alex Wurman
- Distributed by: Avalanche Home Entertainment
- Release date: February 15, 1999
- Running time: 100 minutes
- Country: United States
- Language: English

Bloodsport 4: The Dark Kumite is a 1999 martial arts sports action film directed by Elvis Restaino, from a script written by George Saunders, while Alan Mehrez once again serves as producer. A sequel to Bloodsport III (1997) and it is the fourth installment overall in the Bloodsport film series. Daniel Bernhardt returns to the series, albeit in the new role of John Keller. It was released direct-to-video in 1999.

== Premise ==
Agent John Keller goes undercover into the tough prison known as Fuego Penal to find out about the corpses of prisoners disappearing without a trace. There he gets involved in a dangerous tournament, the Kumite, arranged by a man named Justin Caesar, where the prisoners are forced to fight to the death. The tournament has only one rule: There are no rules.

== Cast ==
- Daniel Bernhardt as John Keller
- Stefanos Miltsakakis as Maximilian Schrek
- Ivan Ivanov as Justin Caesar
- Lisa Stothard as Blaire
- Michael Krawic as Winston
- Derek McGrath as Warden Preston
- David Rowe as Billings
- Elvis Restaino as Dr. Rosenbloom
- Dennis LaValle as Files
- Christine Marais as Regina
- Jeff Moldovan as Captain Anderson
- Mike Kirton as Prison Guard
- Mitko Kiskimov as Tongo
- Linda Kouleva as Rita
- Stefan Valdobrev as Gills

== Production ==
The prison sequences were shot at a real prison in Bulgaria and actual prisoners were extras in the scenes. Although the film was shot in Bulgaria, Bloodsport 4 is set in the United States. This not only makes it the only Bloodsport movie set there, but the only Bloodsport movie to not be set where it was shot. Though Daniel Bernhardt stars in the previous two films, his character John Keller is different from Alex Cardo in the prior installments.

== Reception ==
The film was panned by critics. Robert Pardi of TV Guide gave the film one star and said: "The good news is that you needn't bother watching the first three Bloodsport flicks in order to make sense of this sequel. The bad news is that it's pure Grade-Z schlock."
