= Bloodsport III =

- Promotional release poster
- Directed by: Alan Mehrez
- Written by: James Williams
- Produced by: Alan Mehrez
- Starring: Daniel Bernhardt; John Rhys-Davies; James Hong; Pat Morita
- Cinematography: Kevan Lind
- Edited by: Ron Cabreros
- Music by: Stephen Edwards
- Distributed by: FM Home Video
- Release date: May 13, 1997
- Running time: 92 minutes
- Country: United States
- Language: English

Bloodsport III is a 1997 martial arts sports action film directed and produced by Alan Mehrez, from a script written by James Williams. It is a direct sequel to Bloodsport II: The Next Kumite, and the third installment overall in the Bloodsport film series. The movie starred Daniel Bernhardt, reprising his role as Alex Cardo. It was released direct-to-video in 1997.

== Plot ==
Alex Cardo wakes up late one night after having dreams of the Kumite years prior. He goes into his 10-year-old son Jason's bedroom to find his son still awake, reading. After questioning him, Jason reveals that he has been suspended for fighting in school. He insists he fought off 3 bullies in self-defense and, to his surprise, Alex is understanding of the situation. Alex suggests that he and Jason go camping together to bond. Alex begins to tell Jason about his former life as a criminal, a prisoner, his tutelage under Master Sun, and, finally, as the champion of the last Kumite. Alex explains to his son that years after his tournament win, he traveled to India and gambled in a casino, when masked men arrived and stole money and a package from the casino, but not before Alex beat up several of the men. After the robbery, the casino owner convinces Alex to retrieve the package (a bag of diamonds) from the robbers, since they belong to a mob boss named Jacques Duvalier. Alex does so, and Duvalier invites him to a dinner party he's hosting as thanks.

At the party, Duvalier shows Alex his top fighter, the Beast, and tries to convince Alex to fight in his upcoming Kumite. Alex refuses, since he does not fight for profit, much to Duvalier's ire. To provoke him into fighting, Duvalier has Sun, Alex's mentor, teacher, and spiritual "father", killed. Alex turns to David Leung to whom he was indebted. Leung directs him to the great shaman, Judge Macado, to whom Alex must turn for guidance. Macado is Sun's brother who developed his own variation of Sun's Iron Hand technique. Macado teaches him to fully channel the energy in his mind and body in order to rout the Beast in the Kumite.

By this point however, Duvalier has invested everything in the Beast and no longer wants Alex in his Kumite for fear he will upset the odds. When he is unable to block Alex's entry, he has his men stationed at the entrances to the tournament arena. Alex gets round this by posing as one of the entourage of Ayindi, another fighter. Both Alex and the Beast make their way through the Kumite, and face each other in the finals. Alex is initially outmatched by the Beast's great physical strength and endurance, and takes a severe beating as a result. Eventually, he remembers his training, and is able to knock out the Beast. He refrains from killing Duvalier, knowing that it won't bring Sun back.

In the present, Alex and Jason finish their camping trip and drive away.

== Cast ==
- Daniel Bernhardt as Alex Cardo
- John Rhys-Davies as Jacques Duvalier
- J. J. Perry as J. J. Tucker
- Chad Stahelski as Max Omega
- James Hong as Master Sun
- Pat Morita as David Leung
- Amber van Lent as Crystal Duvalier
- Uni Park as Shari
- Rajiv Chandrasekhar as Franco
- David Schatz as Jason Cardo
- Steven Ito as Yoong
- Erik Paulson as Stellio
- Hee-il Cho as Judge Macado
  - Gerald Okamura as Judge Macado (voice)
- Nicholas R. Oleson as The Beast
- Erik Paulson as Stellio
- Jahi Zuri as Ayindi
