= Donald Gibb =

American actor (1954–2026)

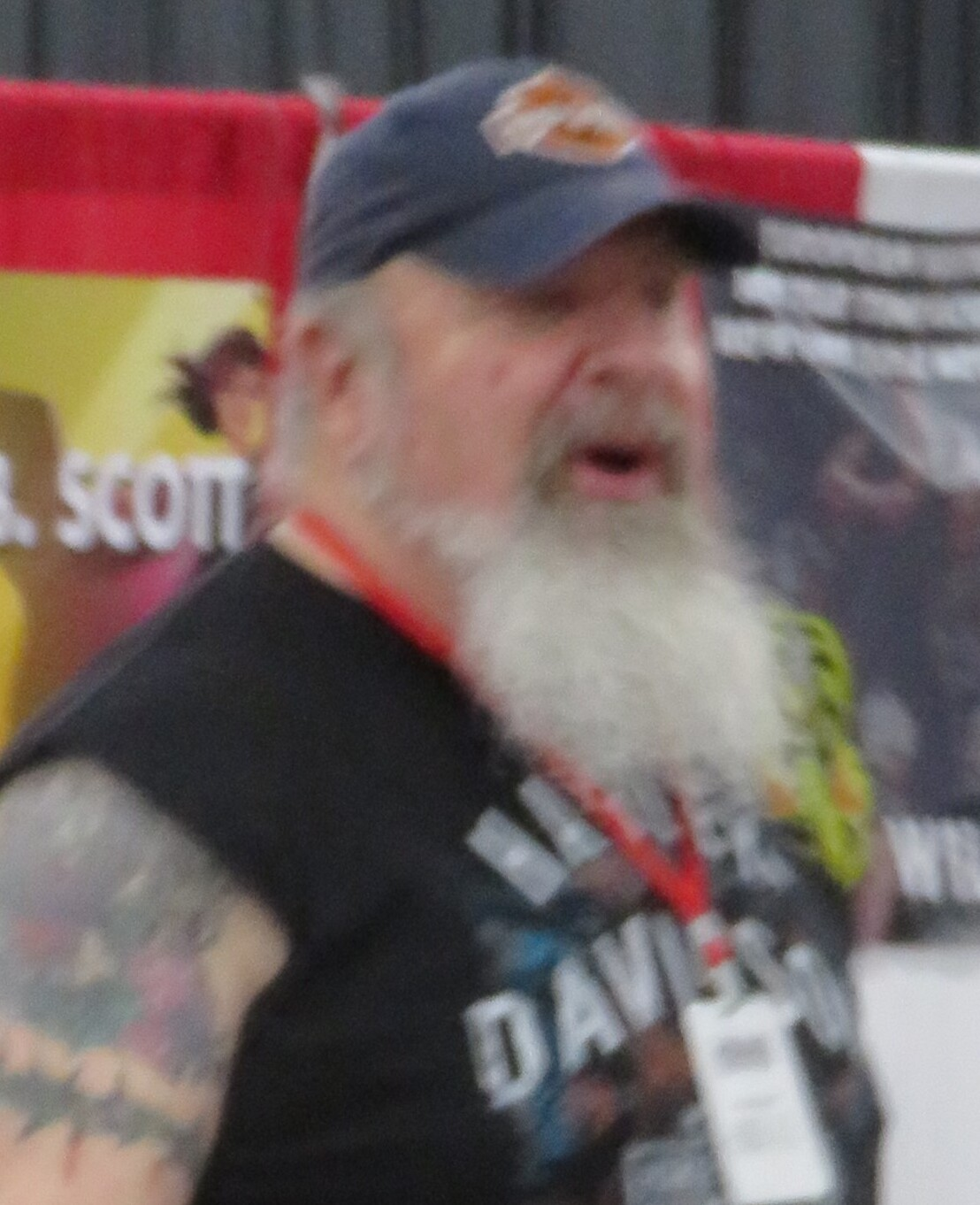
- Gibb at an event in 2018
- Born: Donald Richard Gibb; August 4, 1954; New York City, New York, U.S.
- Died: May 12, 2026 (aged 71); Texas, U.S.
- Education: University of New Mexico; University of San Diego
- Occupation: Actor
- Years active: 1980–2026

Donald Richard Gibb (August 4, 1954 – May 12, 2026) was an American actor, best known for his roles as the hulking, dimwitted fraternity brother Frederick “Ogre” Palowaski in several installments of the Revenge of the Nerds film series, as Kumite fighter Ray Jackson in Bloodsport, and as Leslie "Dr. Death" Krunchner on the HBO sitcom 1st & Ten.

== Early life ==
Gibb was born in New York City on August 4, 1954. He was raised in California and Gibb attended Notre Dame High School in Sherman Oaks, California. Upon graduation he went to the University of New Mexico on a basketball scholarship, where he joined Phi Delta Theta fraternity. He then transferred to the University of San Diego, where he played football on scholarship. Gibb played professional football briefly for the San Diego Chargers before suffering an injury in an automobile accident.

== Career ==
Gibb turned to acting following the automobile accident that prevented him from having a football career. He began with small, uncredited roles in Stripes and Conan the Barbarian. He received recognition in a small role in Lost in America, playing an ex-convict who picks up a hitchhiking main character, with a review stating that his casting was one of several in the film showing that director Albert Brooks had "a rare knack for filling supporting roles with exactly the right person, however unlikely that person would seem to be for that particular role".

He is best known for his Frederick “Ogre” Palowaski character portrayed first in Revenge of the Nerds and later in Revenge of the Nerds II: Nerds in Paradise and Revenge of the Nerds IV: Nerds in Love. Chugging beer from a trophy, throwing nerds off fraternity buildings and competing in belching contests, Gibb gleefully played up his former days as a college football jock. Gibb "experienced a life makeover" between the first and second films in the series, objecting to a proposed scene in the second film in which the script called for the character "to threaten somebody with a piece of wood," with Gibb saying "I personally didn't want to be associated with that kind of action, and I didn't think Ogre would do it, either". The sequel ends with Ogre joining Lambda Lambda Lambda, the titular Nerds' fraternity.

Gibb's other most famous recurring role was in a string of martial arts pictures. As an American entrant named Ray Jackson, he starred alongside Jean-Claude Van Damme in Bloodsport, and alone in the 1996 sequel Bloodsport II: The Next Kumite. In all, Gibb appeared in more than 25 movies including Jocks, Hancock, and Amazon Women on the Moon. He also played a small role in several video games, including the PC game Zork: Grand Inquisitor, as the man in the third portal with Lucy.

On TV, Gibb gained notoriety on HBO's 1st & Ten, as linebacker Leslie "Dr. Death" Krunchner. Gibb played the role from 1984 until 1991, making him one of the few members of the fictional California Bulls to last the entire seven-year run. Among other roles, he played the illiterate biker Scab on the 1992 Fox sitcom Stand by Your Man, which co-starred Melissa Gilbert and Rosie O'Donnell, and played small roles in Quantum Leap, MacGyver, Magnum, P.I., Night Court, Cheers, Renegade, The X-Files, The A-Team, Step by Step, and Early Edition.

Gibb served as the spokesman for Chicago bar Trader Todd's, through which Gibb marketed "Ogre Beer," named after his iconic character in Revenge of the Nerds.

== Death ==
Gibb died from complications of throat cancer at his home in Texas on May 12, 2026, at the age of 71. Weeks before his death, Gibb had also had a heart attack.

== Filmography ==
=== Film ===
Year	Title	Role	Notes	Ref(s)
1980	Any Which Way You Can	Henchman	Uncredited	
1981	Stripes	Bouncer	Uncredited	
1982	Conan the Barbarian	Osric's Guard	Uncredited	
1984	Revenge of the Nerds	Frederick "Ogre" Palowaski		
1984	Meatballs Part II	Mad Dog		
1985	Lost in America	Ex-Convict		
1985	Transylvania 6-5000	Larry the Wolfman		
1986	Jocks	Ripper	Credited as Don Gibb	
1987	They Still Call Me Bruce	The Executioner		
1987	Revenge of the Nerds II: Nerds in Paradise	Fred "Ogre" Palowaski		
1987	Amazon Women on the Moon	Graceless Pirate		
1988	Bloodsport	Ray Jackson		
1992	Missing Pieces	Hurrudnik		
1993	Breakfast of Aliens	Darrell		
1994	Magic Kid 2	Luther	Credited as Don Gibb	
1995	Broken Bars	Jake		
1995	Savate	Cody Johnson	Credited as Don Gibb	
1996	Bloodsport II: The Next Kumite	Ray 'Tiny' Jackson		
1996	American Tigers	Dan Storm		
1997	High Voltage	Bartender	Uncredited	
1998	U.S. Marshals	Michael Conroy	Credited as Don Gibb	
1999	Durango Kids	Mountain Man Morris	Credited as Don Gibb	
2002	The Biggest Fan	Band Manager	Credited as Don Gibb	
2003	Grind	Scabby Security Guy	Credited as Don Gibb	
2004	Lightning Bug	Uncle Marvin	Credited as Don Gibb	
2005	Window Theory	Judson		
2006	8 of Diamonds	Big Mike	Credited as Don Gibb	
2008	Hancock	Convict	Credited as Don Gibb	

=== Television ===
Year	Title	Role	Notes	Ref(s)
1981	Nichols & Dymes		Television film	
1982–1983	Magnum, P.I.	Condley Willard; Harms	2 Episodes	
1983	Alice	Moose	1 Episode: "Jolene and the Night Watchman" as Don Gibb	
1983	Simon & Simon	Lebow's #2 henchman	1 Episode: "Grand Illusion" (Uncredited)	
1983	Hardcastle and McCormick	Johnson	1 Episode: "The Crystal Duck"	
1983	The A-Team	Hal Billings	1 Episode: "The Taxicab Wars"	
1983	Just Our Luck		1 Episode: "No Holds Barred" as Don Gibb	
1984	Knight Rider	Gibbs	1 Episode: "Knight of the Chameleon" as Don Gibb	
1984–1991	1st & Ten	Leslie 'Dr. Death' Krunchner	80 Episodes	
1985	Otherworld	Motoface	1 Episode: "Village of the Motorpigs"	
1985	Benson	Big Luther	1 Episode: "Uncle Jack"	
1985	Streets of Justice	Road Rodant	Television film; Credited as Don Gibb	
1987	U.S. Marshals: Waco & Rhinehart	Varela Leader	Television film	
1987	The Facts of Life	Wendell	1 Episode: "The More the Marrier" as Don Gibb	
1989	227	Skullcrusher	1 Episode: "Flying Down to Leo's" as Don Gibb	
1989–1990	My Two Dads	Chuck; Officer Eugene	2 Episodes	
1990	Hunter	Stryber	1 Episode: "Unfinished Business" as Don Gibb	
1990	Dear John	Frenchie	1 Episode: "John's Night Out" as Don Gibb	
1990	Night Court	Terry Benoon	1 Episode: "Nobody Says Rat Fink Anymore" as Don Gibb	
1990	They Came from Outer Space	Mr. Geek	1 Episode: "Mr. Geek" as Don Gibb	
1990	Doctor Doctor	Sam	1 Episode: "Somewhere in the Berkshires"	
1991	Sons and Daughters	Slasher Martin	1 Episode: "The Thing"	
1991	Amen	Cashmere	1 Episode: "The Wild Deak" as Don Gibb	
1991	MacGyver	Herman the German	1 Episode: "Split Decision" as Don Gibb	
1991	True Colors	Officer Johnson	1 Episode: "Seems Like Old Times" as Don Gibb	
1992	Quantum Leap	Jeeters	1 Episode: "Roberto!" as Don Gibb	
1992	Stand by Your Man	Scab	7 Episodes	
1992	Cheers	Tiny	1 Episode: "Teaching with the Enemy" as Don Gibb	
1992–1993	Renegade	Hog Adams; Cletus Hog Adams	2 Episodes	
1993	Harry and the Hendersons	Valentine	2 Episodes as Don Gibb	
1993	The X-Files	Kip	1 Episode: "Conduit" as Don Gibb	
1993	Daddy Dearest	Inmate #2	1 Episode: "American We"	
1993	Hearts Afire	Ray	1 Episode: "The Stud Club" as Don Gibb	
1993–1994	Empty Nest	Jake; Biker #1	2 Episodes as Don Gibb	
1993–1998	Step by Step	Slasher / Moose	6 Episodes	
1994	Boy Meets World	Tony	1 Episode: "It's a Wonderful Night" as Don Gibb	
1994	Midnight Runaround	Clyde	Television film; Credited as Don Gibb	
1994	Revenge of the Nerds IV: Nerds in Love	Ogre	Television film; Credited as Don Gibb	
1994	Muddling Through	Bud	1 Episode: "It's a Date"	
1994–1996	Weird Science	Biker Dude; Singing Guy; Rolph	3 Episodes	
1995	Seinfeld	Letter S in Devils Body Painter	1 Episode: "The Face Painter" (Uncredited)	
1995	Misery Loves Company	Prussian Helmet Biker	1 Episode: "Uneasy Rider"	
1995	Kirk	Biker	1 Episode: "Helloween"	
1996	Unhappily Ever After	Spike	1 Episode: "Meter Maid"	
1996	Homeboys in Outer Space	Galdor	1 Episode: "Behold a Pale Planet, or What If God Was One of Us" as Don Gibb	
1996	Pacific Blue	Barger	1 Episode: "Cranked Up" as Don Gibb	
1997	Sparks	Fitch	1 Episode: "Self Defense"	
1997	Hangin' with Mr. Cooper	Security Guard	1 Episode: "The Idol" as Don Gibb	
1998	Beyond Belief: Fact or Fiction	Gunnar; Kind Trucker	2 Episodes	
1999	Arli$$	Jake's Father	1 Episode: "Taking One for the Team"	
2000	The Steve Harvey Show	Tiny	1 Episode: "Black Streak" as Don Gibb	
2000	Secret Agent Man	Buff Bobby Barnett	1 Episode: "WhupSumAss"	
2000	Early Edition	Odessa "Stumpy" McNeil	1 Episode: "Mel Schwartz, Bounty Hunter" as Don Gibb	
2000	Veronica's Closet	Spaz	1 Episode: "Veronica's Sleepover"	
2001	Black Scorpion	Smash Clone #1	1 Episode: "An Officer and a Prankster	
2001	Philly	Mickey Horvath	1 Episode: "Truth or Consequence" (Uncredited)	
2002	She Spies	Scarface	1 Episode: "Daddy's Girl" as Don Gibb	
2003	The Young and the Restless	Worm	2 Episodes; Credited as Don Gibb	
2007	The Fantastic Two	Psycho	Television mini-series	
2011	Secret Mountain Fort Awesome	Additional Voices	1 Episode: "The 6th Disqustoid" (Voice Role)	
2016	Captain Kyle's Cosplay Spotlight		1 Episode: "Pennywise"	

=== Video games ===
Year	Title	Role	Notes	Ref(s)
1995	What's My Story	Giant	Voice Role; Credited as Don Gibb	
1997	Zork: Grand Inquisitor	Floyd the Bouncer	Voice Role; Credited as Don Gibb	
2003	Alter Echo	Gherran	Voice Role; Credited as Don Gibb	
2010	Mafia II	Angry Prisoner	Voice Role	
2011	Rage		Voice Role	
