= Daniel Bernhardt =

Swiss actor and stuntman

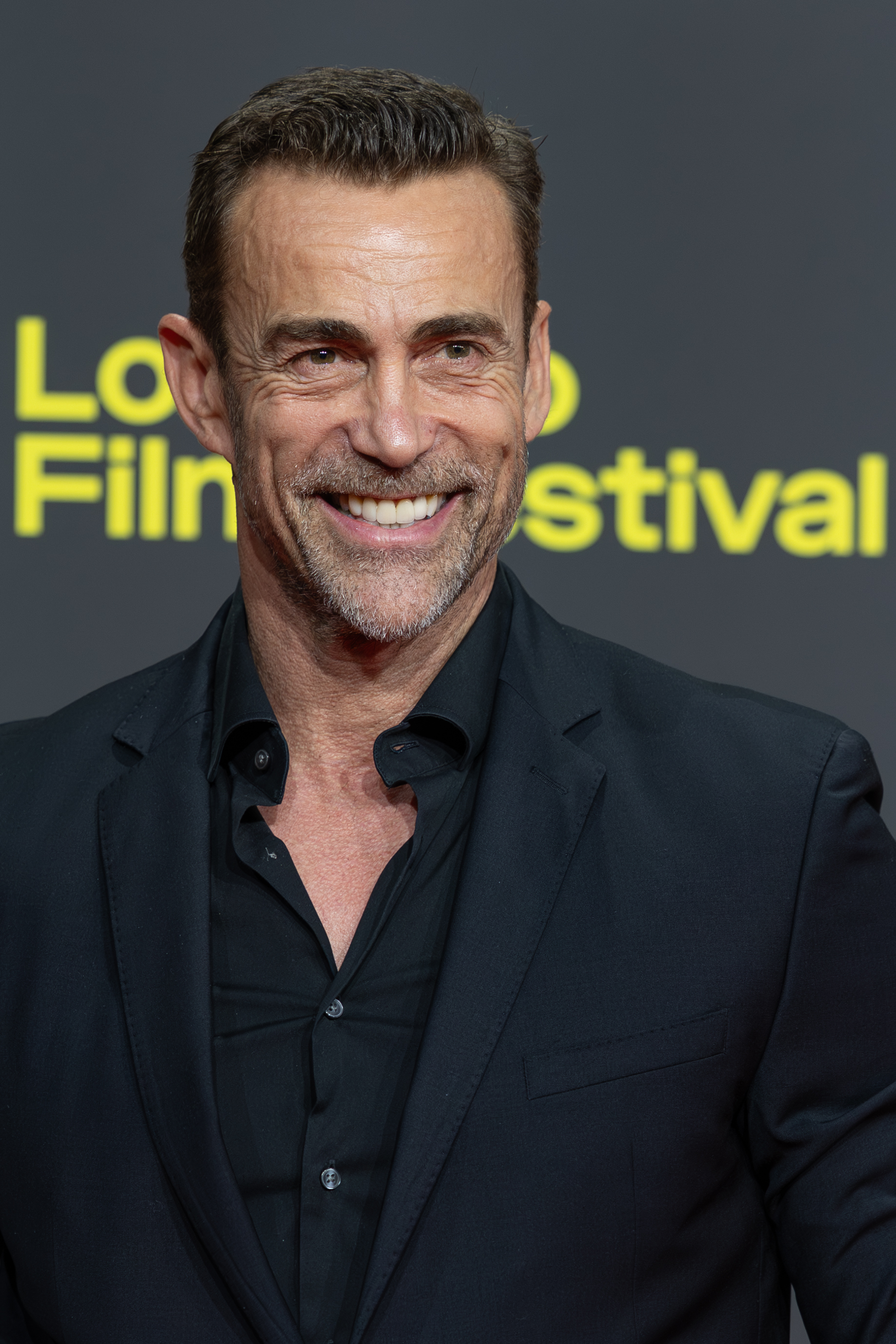
- Bernhardt in 2025
- Born: 31 August 1965 (age 61); Ittigen, Canton of Bern, Switzerland
- Occupations: Actor, stunt performer, model, fight choreographer
- Years active: 1996–present
- Spouse: Lisa Stothard
- Children: 1

Daniel Bernhardt (born 31 August 1965) is a Swiss actor, stuntman, martial artist, and former model. He is known for his work on various action films. He made his acting debut in the leading role in the martial arts film Bloodsport II: The Next Kumite (1996), and appeared in two of its sequels, Bloodsport III (1997) and Bloodsport 4: The Dark Kumite (1999).

Also known for playing villainous characters, he appeared opposite Chuck Norris in The Cutter (2005), Jean-Claude Van Damme in Kill 'Em All (2017), Sylvester Stallone in Escape Plan: The Extractors (2019), and Keanu Reeves in The Matrix Reloaded (2003), John Wick (2014) and Ballerina (2025). He also starred as Siro in the television series Mortal Kombat: Conquest (1998–1999). As a stunt performer and fight choreographer, his work includes Creed II (2018) and Nobody (2021).

Bernhardt is a black belt in Taekwondo under Black Belt Hall of Fame member Hee-il Cho (the two also starred together in Bloodsport II). He also studied Kyokushin karate under South Korean master Mas Oyama.

== Early life ==
Bernhardt was born in Ittigen, Canton of Bern, in 1965, to Heidi and Horst Bernhardt. He began studying martial arts at the age of 15, learning what called “something cobbled together out of kung fu and kickboxing." He later earned black belts in Taekwondo under Hee-il Cho and Kyokushin Karate under Mas Oyama. In Paris, he was a pupil of Dominique Valera. He has also studied boxing, judo, and Brazilian Jiu Jitsu.

Prior to his acting career, Bernhardt worked at an architecture firm and was a top model in Paris and New York City, working for the likes of Claude Montana, Thierry Mugler, Hugo Boss, and Versace. His first exposure to the film world was in 1992, when he was featured in a martial arts-themed Versace ad campaign, featuring Jean-Claude Van Damme. He subsequently moved to Los Angeles to pursue a film career.

== Career ==
=== Acting ===
Bernhardt made his acting debut in the leading role in Bloodsport II: The Next Kumite (1996), a sequel to the 1988 Jean-Claude Van Damme film.

He also appeared in two of its sequels and starred in Future War (1997), True Vengeance (1997), Perfect Target (1997), G2 – Mortal Conquest (1999), Black Sea Raid (2000) and Global Effect (2002). From 1998 to 1999, he starred in the TV series Mortal Kombat: Conquest.

In 2003, he appeared as Agent Johnson in The Matrix Reloaded (2003), and in 2005 he appeared with Chuck Norris in The Cutter.

In 2013, he returned to acting with Jason Statham in Parker (2013) and in a cameo in The Hunger Games: Catching Fire (2013) as the male tribute from District 9. He trained with the 87Eleven Stunt Team and played Russian henchmen in John Wick and Atomic Blonde. In 2015, he made his Bollywood debut as mixed martial arts fighter Max Potter in the remake of Warrior, titled Brothers. He co-starred in a particularly acclaimed episode of HBO's Barry as Ronny Proxin.

In September 2020, it was announced that Bernhardt would be reprising his Matrix role as Agent Johnson in The Matrix Resurrections; however, his scenes were cut from the final film.

Bernhardt played the title character in Deathstalker, a remake of the 1983 cult film of the same.

=== Stunts ===
Bernhardt's credits as a stunt performer include A Good Day to Die Hard (2013), Teenage Mutant Ninja Turtles (2014), Captain America: Civil War (2016), Deadpool 2 (2018), Alita: Battle Angel (2019), Hobbs & Shaw (also 2019), and Guardians of the Galaxy Vol. 3 (2023). He was the principal fight trainer and fight choreographer for Creed II (2018) and Nobody (2021), for which he trained Bob Odenkirk in fighting for two years, and The Equalizer television series.

== Personal life ==
Bernhardt has two brothers, Cliff and Dirk. He is married to actress Lisa Stothard, whom he met on the set of Bloodsport: The Dark Kumite. They have a daughter together.

== Filmography ==
=== Film ===
Year	Title	Role
1996	Bloodsport II: The Next Kumite	Alex Cardo
1997	Bloodsport III	Alex Cardo
1997	Future War	The Runaway
1997	True Vengeance	Allen Griffin
1997	Perfect Target	David Benson
1997	Bloodsport 4: The Dark Kumite	John Keller
1999	G2 – Mortal Conquest	Steven Conlin
1999	Black Sea Raid	Rick Halsey
2002	Global Effect	Lieutenant Marcus Poynt
2003	The Matrix Reloaded	Agent Johnson
2003	The Librarians	Toshko
2005	Confessions of an Action Star	Jason Everstrong
2005	Tornado – Rain to Kill	
2005	The Cutter	Dirk Cross
2007	Children of Wax	Murat
2010	Supreme Champion	Lucien Gallows
2011	Creature	Lockjaw / Grimley
2012	Foodfight!	Additional Voices (voice)
2012	Santa's Summer House	Bryan
2013	Parker	Kroll
2013	The Hunger Games: Catching Fire	District 9 Male Tribute
2013	Zombeo & Juliécula	Vladimir
2014	Knock 'em Dead	Victor The Butler
2014	John Wick	Kirill
2015	The Vatican Tapes	Psych Ward Security (uncredited)
2015	Brothers	Max Potter
2016	Precious Cargo	Simon
2016	Term Life	Detective Rick DiNardi (uncredited)
2017	Logan	'Bone Breaker'
2017	Atomic Blonde	Soldier
2017	Kill 'Em All	Radovan Brokowski
2019	Escape Plan: The Extractors	Silva
2019	Hobbs & Shaw	Henchman (uncredited)
2020	Birds of Prey	Sionis' Chauffeur
2020	Skylines	Owens
2021	Hell Hath No Fury	Von Bruckner
2021	Nobody	Bus Goon
2021	Red Notice	Drago Grande (cameo role)
2021	The Matrix Resurrections	Agent Johnson
2023	Extraction 2	Konstantine
2024	The Killer's Game	Max
2024	Utopia	William Sallow
2024	Chief of Station	Kharon
2025	Ballerina	Scarred Eye Assassin
2025	Nobody 2	Kartoush
2025	Afterburn	Gorynych
2025	Deathstalker	Deathstalker
2026	Man of War	Koniev
2026	Matchbox: The Movie	Falko
TBA	Painter	TBA

=== Television ===
Year(s)	Title	Role	Notes
1998–1999	Mortal Kombat: Conquest	Siro	22 episodes
2006	Desire	Vincent	4 episodes
2016	Castle	Vincent	Episode: "XX"
2018	Altered Carbon	Jaeger	5 episodes
2019	Barry	Ronny Proxin	Episode: "ronny/lily"
