= Bloodsport II: The Next Kumite =

- Promotional release poster
- Directed by: Alan Mehrez
- Written by: Jeff Schechter
- Produced by: Alan Mehrez
- Starring: Daniel Bernhardt; Pat Morita; Donald Gibb; James Hong
- Cinematography: Jacques Haitkin
- Edited by: J. Douglas Seelig
- Music by: Stephen Edwards
- Production company: F.M. Entertainment International N.V.
- Distributed by: Transcontinental Film Corporation
- Release date: 1 March 1996
- Running time: 86 minutes
- Country: United States
- Language: English
- Box office: $684,351

Bloodsport II: The Next Kumite is a 1996 martial arts sports film directed and produced by Alan Mehrez and written by Jeff Schechter. It is a standalone sequel to Bloodsport (1988), and the second installment in the Bloodsport film series. The film stars Daniel Bernhardt as new character Alex Cardo. It was released through limited theatrical distribution, before debuting on home video in 1996.

== Plot ==
Thief Alex Cardo gets caught stealing an ancient Jian in Thailand, and soon finds himself imprisoned. One of the guards, Demon, tortures him whenever he gets the opportunity. Alex finds one friend and mentor, Master Sun, who teaches him a fighting style called "Iron Hand". When a "best of the best Kumite" is to take place, Demon is invited. Master Sun and Alex find a way to let Alex take part in the tournament.

The final fight pits Alex versus Demon. Demon has the upper hand until Alex uses the "Iron Hand" to defeat Demon. Alex is the winner, and as part of a deal previously made, he and Master Sun are freed from prison.

== Cast ==
- Daniel Bernhardt as Alex Cardo
- Pat Morita as David Leung
- Donald Gibb as Ray "Tiny" Jackson
- James Hong as Master Sun
- Lori Lynn Dickerson as Janine Elson
- Ong Soo Han as Demon
- Philip Tan as John
- Nicholas Hill as Sergio DeSilva
- Ron Hall as Cliff
- Hee Il Cho as Head Judge
- Shaun Gordon as Sun's Student
- Lisa McCullough as Kim Campbell
- Chuay as Chien
- Steve Martinex as Head Referee
- Jeff Wolfe as Flash
- Cliff Bernhardt as Len
- Nils Allen Stewart as Gorilla
- Eric Lee as Seng
- Kevin Chong as Sun's Student
- Jerry Piddington as Fighter
- Richard Kee Smith as Fghter
- Gokor Chivichyan as Fighter

== Reception ==
The film was met with a warm critical response, with praise directed towards its cast, namely Daniel Bernhardt. It met expectations of the audience with some calling it superior to the original. The film has garnered a cult following.

== Sequels ==
The movie was followed by sequel films, including Bloodsport III (1998), Bloodsport 4: The Dark Kumite (1999) and Lady Bloodfight (2016).
