= Koper (disambiguation) =

Koper is a city in Slovenia.

Koper may also refer to:

- Koper (surname)
- Koper (film)
- Koper, Malakand, a commune in Pakistan
- Koper Department, a commune in Burkina Faso
- FC Koper, a football club in Koper, Slovenia
- RK Koper, a handball club in Koper, Slovenia
- Radio Koper, a radio station in Koper, Slovenia
