= Koper (surname) =

Koper is a surname. Notable people with the surname include:

- Andrzej Koper (born 1953), Polish rally driver
- Antoni Koper (1906–1990), Polish World War II resistance fighter
- Brittany Koper (born 1985), American whistleblower
- Bud Koper (born 1942), American basketball player
- Christopher S. Koper, American professor
- Janet Koper (1931–1988), Canadian politician
- Peter Koper (1947–2022), American writer and professor
