= Long Island Business News =

Weekly business newspaper on Long Island, New York

- Type: Weekly newspaper
- Format: Tabloid
- Owner: BridgeTower Media
- Founder(s): Arthur Hug, John and Peg Whitmore
- Founded: 1953; 73 years ago
- Language: English
- Headquarters: 2150 Smithtown Ave, Ste 7 Ronkonkoma, NY 11779
- Circulation: 9,000 (as of 2020)
- ISSN: 0894-4806
- Website: libn.com

Long Island Business News (LIBN) is a weekly business newspaper based in Ronkonkoma, New York. It was launched in 1953 as the Long Island Commercial Review. It covers business, government, legal, nonprofit and health care news in Long Island's two counties, Nassau and Suffolk. Since 1998 it has been owned by a succession of national business-newspaper groups, and in 2026 it was part of BridgeTower Media.

== History ==
=== Founding ===
The reporter Arthur Hug founded the paper as the Long Island Commercial Review in 1953 and published it from his basement in Freeport. He started it together with the husband-and-wife team of Peg and John Whitmore. Hug later recalled that the weekly was started so that businessmen could "spring bloody murder about zoning problems, the need for skilled labor and to encourage business on Long Island". Hug had been a reporter at the Nassau Daily Review-Star and later wrote for Newsday. He also worked as a copy editor at the World-Telegram & Sun shortly before it closed.

=== The Townsend years ===
In 1960 Hug sold the paper to Paul and Terry Townsend for $5,000. A history published by the paper in 2018 dates the purchase to "by 1958". The Townsends ran it for 38 years. They also operated a public relations agency that for many years shared offices, and sometimes staff, with the newspaper. Paul Townsend's weekly front-page column, the Townsend Letter, campaigned for regional projects such as the Roosevelt Field shopping mall, MacArthur Airport and the Fire Island National Seashore.

=== Dolan Company ownership ===
The Townsends put the paper up for sale after Paul Townsend had a stroke in 1997. In 1998 it was bought by Dolan Media, a Minneapolis publisher of business newspapers, which appointed John L. Kominicki as publisher. Kominicki changed the paper's reporting practices and later dropped the Townsend Letter. In 2003 the paper had a circulation of about 12,000. By 2013 Newsday put its circulation at about 7,500.

Kominicki left at the end of September 2013 to become a partner and president at a digital marketing agency, after 15 years as publisher; advertising director Ken Kroncke ran the paper while Dolan searched for a successor.

In December 2013 Dolan named Scott Schoen publisher and Greg Zeller, who had returned to the paper in January that year after working there as a reporter and managing editor in 2006, as editor.

=== BridgeTower Media ===
In December 2015 New Media Investment Group, then the parent of GateHouse Media, announced that it had acquired the business-information operation of the Dolan Company, which included Long Island Business News, New Orleans CityBusiness and the Idaho Business Review. The paper became part of BridgeTower Media. When the paper marked its 65th anniversary in 2018, Joe Giametta was its publisher; Kominicki had died in 2017. In November 2020 BridgeTower Media was sold to the private equity firm Transom Capital Group for an undisclosed price.

== Competition ==
In 2026 a Long Island business newsletter, Island Edge Business News, was launched by former News 12 executives, which described Long Island Business News and Newsday as its two business-news competitors.

== Awards ==
In July 2023, Long Island Business News won nine journalism awards from the Press Club of Long Island and the Fair Media Council.
