= Talisa Soto =

American actress and model

- Born: Miriam Soto; March 27, 1967 (age 59); Brooklyn, New York City, U.S.
- Other name: Desiree More
- Occupations: Actress; model
- Years active: 1982–2013
- Known for: Lupe Lamora – Licence to Kill; Princess Kitana – Mortal Kombat, Mortal Kombat Annihilation
- Height: 5 ft 8.5 in (1.74 m)
- Spouses: Costas Mandylor (m. 1997; div. 2000); Benjamin Bratt (m. 2002)
- Children: 2

Talisa Soto (born March 27, 1967) is an American retired actress and model. She is known for portraying Bond girl Lupe Lamora in the 1989 James Bond film Licence to Kill and Kitana in the 1995 fantasy action film Mortal Kombat and its 1997 sequel Mortal Kombat Annihilation. Prior to her acting career, Soto worked as a model, appearing in magazines such as Mademoiselle, Glamour and Elle.

== Early life ==
Soto was born in Brooklyn, New York City, the youngest of four children of parents who moved to New York from Puerto Rico. During her early childhood, her parents moved to Northampton, Massachusetts, where Soto and her siblings were raised and educated in public schools.

== Career ==
=== Modeling ===
At age 15, Soto signed with Click Model Management and began modeling during summer vacations. Weeks after being signed, she traveled to Paris where she appeared in a layout for Vogue shot by Bruce Weber. Soto returned to Northampton after the summer to resume her schooling. She modeled only on occasion until after she graduated from high school.

She later was featured on the covers of American and British Vogue, British Elle, Mademoiselle, Glamour and Self magazines. Soto has also been featured in advertising campaigns for Calvin Klein, Cartier, Clarins, Revlon, Salvatore Ferragamo, Saks Fifth Avenue, and Versace.

Soto appeared in her first music video with former boyfriend Nick Kamen, behind Madonna's song "Each Time You Break My Heart", directed by Tony Viramontes. Soto and Kamen were often used as models by Ray Petri, the late fashion stylist and creator of the 1980s London "Buffalo Boy" look.

=== Acting ===
In 1988, when Soto returned to the United States, she auditioned and landed the role of "India" in her feature debut, Spike of Bensonhurst, a comedy starring Sasha Mitchell and Ernest Borgnine. In 1988, Soto was cast as Lupe Lamora, in the James Bond film Licence to Kill and as Maria Rivera in The Mambo Kings.

Soto appeared in more than twenty films, including Mortal Kombat (1995) as Kitana; Island of the Dead as Melissa O'Keefe; Piñero (2001) as Sugar, starring Benjamin Bratt; and Ballistic: Ecks vs. Sever (2002) as Ryne alongside Lucy Liu and Antonio Banderas. Soto also made two guest appearances on the television series C-16: FBI.

In 1995, she played the role of Doña Julia, Johnny Depp's first love interest in the tongue-in-cheek romantic comedy Don Juan DeMarco, Depp playing the title role. She also made an appearance in Marc Anthony's music video for "I Need to Know". In 1996, Soto played the title role in the campy film Vampirella based on the comic book character. Her last major film appearance was in Ballistic: Ecks vs. Sever before retiring from acting after marrying Benjamin Bratt.

She made one more film, La Mission (2009), which was directed by her brother-in-law Peter Bratt.

== Public image ==
In 1990, Soto was chosen by People as one of the 50 Most Beautiful People in the World. In 1995, she was featured in the Sports Illustrated "Swimsuit Issue". She was ranked No. 58 on the Maxim Hot 100 Women of 2002.

== Personal life ==
In 1997, Soto married actor Costas Mandylor. They divorced in 2000.

In 2002, she began dating actor Benjamin Bratt; they married on April 13 in San Francisco. The two had met ten years earlier during a casting audition. During the filming of Piñero (2001) they began to develop a relationship. They married in April 2002 and their first child, daughter Sophia Rosalinda Bratt, was born on December 6, 2002; their second child, son Mateo Bravery Bratt, was born on October 3, 2005.

It was revealed in 2022 that Soto was diagnosed with breast cancer during the COVID-19 pandemic, but that she has since been deemed "cancer-free".

== Filmography ==
Year	Title	Role	Notes
1984	The Pope of Greenwich Village	Studio Dancer	Uncredited
1988	The French as Seen by...	French Girl	Episode: "The Cowboy and the Frenchman"
1988	Spike of Bensonhurst	India	
1989	Licence to Kill	Lupe Lamora	
1990	Silhouette	Marianna Herrera	Television film
1991	Prison Stories: Women on the Inside	Rosina	Television film
1992	The Mambo Kings	Maria Rivera	
1992	Hostage	Joanna	
1993–1994	Harts of the West	Cassie	15 episodes
1994	Don Juan DeMarco	Doña Julia	
1995	Mortal Kombat	Princess Kitana	
1996	Spy Hard	Seductress In Hotel Room	Credited as Desiree More
1996	The Sunchaser	Navajo Woman	
1996	Vampirella	Vampirella	Direct-to-video
1997	Flypaper	Amanda	
1997	The Corporate Ladder	Susan Taylor	
1997	Mortal Kombat Annihilation	Princess Kitana	
1998	C-16: FBI	Rosemary Vargas	2 episodes
2000	That Summer in L.A.	Marisabel	
2000	Flight of Fancy	Mercedes Marquez	Alternative titles: Facing Fear; Flight
2000	Island of the Dead	Melissa O'Keefe	Television film
2001	Piñero	'Sugar'	
2002	Ballistic: Ecks vs. Sever	Rayne Ecks / Vinn Gant	
2009	La Mission	Ana	Credited as Talisa Soto Bratt

== Awards and nominations ==
Year	Award	Result	Category	Film
1989	ShoWest Convention	Won	Female Star of Tomorrow	-
2002	ALMA Award	Nominated	Outstanding Supporting Actress in a Motion Picture	Piñero
