= Andrew Malekoff =

American chief executive

- Born: May 14, 1951; Newark, NJ
- Died: March 28, 2024 (aged 72)
- Education: Rutgers University
- Occupations: Executive Director, Lecturer, Editor and Author
- Known for: being the Executive Director and CEO, North Shore Child and Family Guidance Center and Editor-in-Chief, Social Work with Groups.

Andrew Malekoff (May 14, 1951 - March 28, 2024) is Executive Director / CEO Emeritus, North Shore Child and Family Guidance Center, where he worked from 1977 - 2021; and is Editor, Social Work with Groups, a quarterly journal of community and clinical practice (1990 - 2024).

== Education ==
Andrew Malekoff holds a BA degree in Economics from Rutgers University (1973). He also holds an MSW degree from Adelphi University (1978).

== Career ==
Andrew Malekoff has worked in the human services field since 1974 when he joined VISTA - Volunteers in Service to America. When he left VISTA, he was employed as Drug-Counselor Coordinator by the Mid-Nebraska Community Mental Health Center in Grand Island.

In August 1976, Malekoff attended Adelphi University School of Social Work. His second year internship was with North Shore Child & Family Guidance Center where he was then employed and has remained, now in his 41st year with the 65-year-old organization.

Malekoff has served in a number of roles with renowned children's mental health agency; ranging from outreach worker to director of program development to associate executive director. In January 2007, Malekoff was appointed the Executive Director/CEO North Shore Child and Family Guidance Center.

Aside from his work at North Shore Child and Family Guidance Center, Malekoff has taught at Adelphi and New York Universities and lectured across the United States and Canada. He is a prolific writer and has been Editor of Social Work with Groups, a journal of community and clinical practice since 1990. Among his hundreds of publications is the Group Work with Adolescents: Principles and Practice (Guilford Press), now available in its 3rd Edition.

Malekoff has received two Folio Awards, in 2018 & 2019, from the Fair Media Council for his written commentary that was published in Long Island, NY newspapers. His most recent book, Group Work Stories Celebrating Diversity, an edited collection was published in 2018 by Routledge.

His commentary has appeared in a number of mainstream media outlets including Long Island Newsday, Long Island Business News, Times Union (Albany, NY), Long Island Weekly (an Anton Media publication), the Island Now (a Blank Slate Media publication) and Long Island Herald. His commentary has also appeared in the Huffington Post, The Hill and New York Times.

In 2018, Malekoff appeared on MetroFocus, a PBS television news journal, to address the challenges of providing timely affordable mental health treatment and addiction care.

Malekoff is a long time member of the board of directors of the International Association for Social Work with Groups. He has served as chairman of the Civil Service Commission for the City of Long Beach, NY from 2004-2005.

== Awards ==
- 2022 - New York Press Association's Better Newspaper Contest, First Place in Best Column published in 2021 - providing perspective, making the reader think, understand and care.
- 2021 - Blank Slate Media's Top Business Leader in Nassau County, NY.
- 2020 - Albert Nelson Marquis Lifetime Achievement Award, recognizing the most accomplished individuals and innovators from every significant field of endeavor.
- 2020 - Long Island Business News’ 2020 Power 30 Healthcare: The 30 Most Powerful People in Long Island Healthcare.
- 2020 - Columbia High School Athletic Hall of Fame, Maplewood, New Jersey (all around athlete designation at Columbia HS and Rutgers University - football, wrestling, lacrosse, rugby)
- 2019 - International Association for Social Work with Groups (IASWG), 41st Annual Symposium Honoree in recognition of contributions made to the mission of IASWG in education, furthering practice knowledge and infusing others with the desire to embrace social work with groups.
- 2019 - Hispanic Brotherhood of Rockville Center, NY, Annual Scholarship Dinner Honoree.
- 2019 - Folio Award by Fair Media Council, Best Commentary – “Kids in Caves and Kids in Cages.”
- 2019 - Rutgers University Delta Upsilon Distinguished Alumni Award, for excellence in one’s field or profession, New Brunswick New Jersey.
- 2018 - Leader of Awareness Award by the National Alliance on Mental Illness (NAMI) – New York State, October 26, 2018, for helping to ensure that people with mental illness and substance use disorder receive equal access to health services.
- 2018 - Folio Award from the Fair Media Council - Best Column: Looking for a Path Back to Civility
- 2017 - City & State’s 2nd annual 50 Over Fifty Awards: Honoring New York’s most prominent leaders in government, business and media, January 30, 2017.
- 2017 - Long Island Business Executive Circle Award
- 2016 - David Award by Networking Magazine
- 2014 - Nassau County Department of Human Services, Office of Mental Health, Chemical Dependency and Developmental Disabilities Services, “2014 Outstanding Provider of the Year in Delivering Integrated Care to Families, 2014, Presented on December 12, 2014 at Hofstra University, Hempstead, NY
- 2014 - Lorraine Danser Award, STRONG YOUTH INC., 2014, “for tireless effort and dedication for the betterment of the community and youth,”
- 2007 - Social Work Practitioner of the Year, New York State Education Association; presented in Saratoga Springs, NY.
- 1997 - Distinguished Service Award by North Shore Child and Family Guidance Center; presented in Garden City, NY.
