= Kickboxer (film series) =

American action film franchise

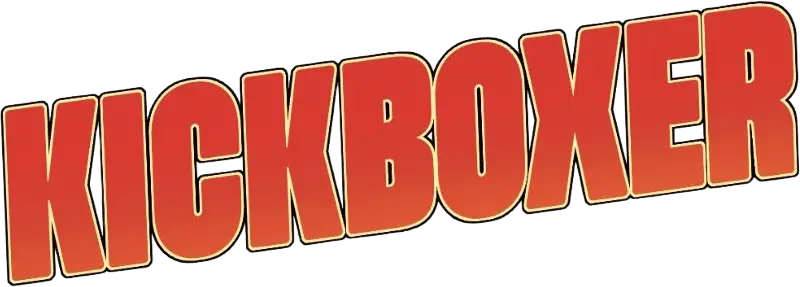
- Directed by: Mark DiSalle (1); David Worth (1); Albert Pyun (2, 4); Rick King (3); Kristine Peterson (5); John Stockwell (6); Dimitri Logothetis (7, 8)
- Distributed by: Kings Road Entertainment
- Country: United States
- Language: English

Kickboxer is an American action film franchise that totals seven titles. The first instalment, released in 1989, revolves around a character named Kurt Sloane, played by Jean-Claude Van Damme. As Van Damme opted out of doing Kickboxer 2 to work on Double Impact, the second through fourth instalments focus on the character David Sloane, played by Sasha Mitchell, the younger brother to Van Damme's character. Redemption: Kickboxer 5 (simply titled The Redemption in the opening title card) focuses on Matt Reeves, played by Mark Dacascos, a friend of the Sloane family.

After a long hiatus, a sixth entry was made, titled Kickboxer: Vengeance, which serves as a reboot to the storyline, with Alain Moussi portraying Kurt Sloane and Van Damme playing his trainer. The seventh entry, titled Kickboxer: Retaliation, is a direct sequel to Kickboxer: Vengeance. An eighth film, titled Kickboxer: Armageddon, is in the works.

== Films ==
Film	U.S. release date	Director(s)	Screenwriter(s)	Producer(s)
Kickboxer	September 8, 1989	Mark DiSalle & David Worth	Glenn A. Bruce	Mark di Salle
Kickboxer 2	June 13, 1991	Albert Pyun	David S. Goyer	Tom Karnowski
Kickboxer 3	September 4, 1992	Rick King	Dennis A. Pratt	Michael D. Pariser
Kickboxer 4	March 3, 1994	Albert Pyun	Albert Pyun & David Yorkin	Jessica G. Budin
Redemption: Kickboxer 5	August 1995	Kristine Peterson	Rick Filon	Michael S. Murphey
Kickboxer: Vengeance	September 2, 2016	John Stockwell	Dimitri Logothetis & Jim McGrath	Nicholas Celozzi, Ted Field & Dimitri Logothetis
Kickboxer: Retaliation	January 26, 2018	Dimitri Logothetis	Dimitri Logothetis & Jim McGrath	Dimitri Logothetis & Robert Hickman

== Cast and characters ==
Character	Original series					Reboot series	
Character	Kickboxer	Kickboxer 2	Kickboxer 3	Kickboxer 4	Redemption: Kickboxer 5	Kickboxer: Vengeance	Kickboxer: Retaliation
Character	1989	1991	1992	1994	1995	2016	2018
Kurt Sloane	Jean-Claude Van Damme	Emmanuel Kervyn		Jean-Claude Van Damme A		Alain Moussi	Alain Moussi
Tong "The Tiger" Po	Michel Qissi	Michel Qissi		Kamel Krifa		Dave Bautista	
Eric Sloane	Dennis Alexio	Casey Stengel		Dennis Alexio		Darren Shahlavi	
Xian Chow	Dennis Chan	Dennis Chan	Dennis Chan				
David Sloane		Sasha Mitchell	Sasha Mitchell	Sasha Mitchell			
Matt Reeves					Mark Dacascos		
Mr. Negaal					James Ryan		
Master Durand						Jean-Claude Van Damme	Jean-Claude Van Damme
Mongkut							Hafþór Júlíus Björnsson
Joseph King						Steven Swadling	Steven Swadling
