= Kickboxer 4 =

1994 American martial arts film

- Official DVD cover of a double feature with Kickboxer 3
- Directed by: Albert Pyun
- Written by: Albert Pyun; David Yorkin
- Produced by: Jessica G. Budin
- Starring: Sasha Mitchell; Kamel Krifa; Nicholas Guest; Michele Krasnoo; Brad Thornton; Dana Dru Evenson; Deborah Mansy; Jill Pierce
- Cinematography: George Mooradian
- Edited by: Ken Morrisey
- Music by: Anthony Riparetti
- Production companies: Kings Road Entertainment; Wetherly Productions
- Distributed by: Live Entertainment (U.S.); Moonstone Entertainment (Non-U.S.)
- Release date: March 3, 1994
- Running time: 90 minutes
- Country: United States
- Language: English

Kickboxer 4 (stylized on-screen as Kickboxer 4: The Aggressor) is a 1994 American direct-to-video martial arts film directed by Albert Pyun. The film is the fourth entry in the Kickboxer film series. This was the last film to star Sasha Mitchell, who reprises his role as David Sloan.

== Plot ==
Having been framed for murder by Tong Po, David Sloan has spent the last two years in prison, while his wife Vicky has become the sexual captive of his old nemesis, who has become one of the most powerful drug lords in Mexico.

After receiving explicit photos of his wife, David meets with a DEA official, Casey Ford, who informs David that Po is hosting a martial arts tournament at his private compound, with the winner earning a match against Po and a $1 million cash prize. Knowing the history between them, Casey offers to release David if he will enter the tournament and eliminate Po himself. Under the alias "Jack Jones", David wins a street fight and earns a necessary invitation from a man named Brubaker, who scouts fighters and invites them the tournament.

David enters a roadside bar and fights off a group of thugs harassing a young woman named Megan Laurence, who reveals that she is also entering the tournament. David arrives at the compound and is greeted by Darcy Cove, one of Po's many female sex slaves, who tells him that he must compete in the qualifying matches. David witnesses Thomas, a brutal fighter, take out another young fighter. Then, David is chosen to face Megan. Reluctant to harm the woman despite her taunting, David passively subdues her. He also meets up with an old acquaintance named Lando Smith, who turns out to be his backup on the mission.

At the party of the tournament's seventh anniversary, Po's henchman Bill introduces Po to the crowd. David leaves the party soon after to search for his wife but finds the entire compound heavily guarded. Meanwhile, Po offers Megan a second chance to compete, but places a bounty on her head inciting all the other fighters to attack her at once. Megan holds her own until Po attacks her, prompting Lando to intervene and escort Megan back to her room.

That night, a disguised David searches the compound and locates his wife, but is unable to free her before the alarm sounds, forcing him to escape. The next morning, he befriends Megan and offers his help for the upcoming tournament.

Lando enters a romance with Darcy and offers her freedom from Po in exchange for information on David's wife. Lando passes her intel on to David before being caught by Bill and his guards. Po tortures Lando to learn why he has come to the tournament, but unable to get a satisfactory answer, he brings forth Darcy and tortures her as well, forcing Lando to admit that he is a DEA agent. Lando pleads for Darcy's life, but Po tortures her to death.

Later, David seeks to free his wife again but is captured by Po, who is surprised to see his old rival. On the final day of the tournament, Po declares that all fights will be to the death and dismisses several fighters who are unwilling to participate, but shoots them all dead as they depart. The tournament proceeds with even more fighters killed by their opponents, until both Lando and David are dragged into the arena.

Po announces that the tournament is a memorial to his late wife, Sian, who was killed five years prior when the DEA invaded his home. He blames David for her death and offers a $500,000 bonus to whoever is able to defeat him. Thomas accepts the challenge, but David defeats him along with the subsequent challengers. In frustration, Po orders Megan to fight him, but she refuses. Po threatens to kill them all if she does not fight, but Megan asserts there was never any prize money, and that Po intends to kill them all regardless, her words prompting the other fighters to rally against Po's armed guards.

The fighters seem to have a strong advantage, until Po himself enters the fray and begins to subdue them. In the end, only David and Po are left standing. After a brutal fight, David defeats Po once again, but Bill takes Vicky at gunpoint, giving Po the opportunity to escape. David dispatches Bill with a well-aimed knife throw before he and Vicky exit the compound along with Lando and Megan.

== Cast ==
- Sasha Mitchell as David Sloane
- Nicholas Guest as DEA Agent Casey Ford
- Brad Thornton as Lando Smith
- Thom Mathews as Bill
- Kamel Krifa as Tong "The Tiger" Po
- Michele Krasnoo as Megan Laurence
- Deborah Mansy as Vicky Sloane
- Jill Pierce as Darcy Cove
- Nicholas Anthony as Brubaker
- Derek Partridge as Bob "Mexican Bob"
- Burton Richardson as Thomas
- Terri Conn as Eliza
- Jackson D. Kane as The Warden
- John Machado as The Fighter

== Reception ==
TV Guide rated it 2 out of 5 stars and wrote: "Kickboxer 4 does proud by the franchise that gave the world Jean-Claude Van Damme". Adam Arseneau of DVD Verdict called it an improvement over the third film but still bad. In 2012, Brian Tremml of Paste included it their list of "The 25 Most Awesomely Bad Movies on Netflix Instant".
