= Vincent Musetto =

American journalist (1941–2015)

- Born: Vincent Albert Musetto Jr. May 1941; Boonton, New Jersey, U.S.
- Died: June 9, 2015 (aged 74); New York City, U.S.
- Other name: V.A. Musetto
- Occupations: Editor, writer, critic

Vincent Musetto (May 1941 – June 9, 2015) was an American newspaper editor and film critic for the New York Post. He retired from the New York Post in 2011. He was best known for having written the headline "Headless body in topless bar" in 1983. The events inspiring the headline served as the premise for Headless Body in Topless Bar (1995), a black comedy written by Peter Koper and directed by James Bruce. After the film was released, Musetto said that "Headless" was not the best headline he wrote, instead preferring "Granny Slain in Pink Pajamas". Musetto died on June 9, 2015 from pancreatic cancer.
