= Guy De Saint Cyr =

German actor (born 1958)

Guy De Saint Cyr (born 15 April 1958, in Berlin, Germany) is a German actor.

He starred in the 1989 James Bond film Licence to Kill as a henchman named Braun of the drug baron Franz Sanchez, played by Robert Davi.

== Filmography ==
Year	Title	Role	Notes
1989	Licence to Kill	Braun	
1989	Romero	Master Sergeant	
1999	One Man's Hero	Lasher	
2001	Original Sin	Chief Jailer	
2001	The Pearl	Mariano	
