= Stephen J. Friedman (producer) =

American film producer

- Born: March 15, 1937; Brooklyn, New York
- Died: October 4, 1996 (aged 59); Brentwood, California
- Occupation: Film producer
- Years active: 1971–1995

Stephen Jay Friedman (March 15, 1937 – October 4, 1996) was an American film producer known for The Last Picture Show (1971) and The Big Easy (1986). In 1980, he formed Kings Road Entertainment – named after the West Hollywood street where he lived – making him one of the first independent film producers to raise substantial film funding through a publicly traded company.

== Early life ==
Born in Brooklyn, New York, Friedman graduated from Midwood High School in Brooklyn, the Wharton School at the University of Pennsylvania, and then obtained a law degree at Harvard University. He began his legal career with the Federal Trade Commission, then went to work as an entertainment attorney for Columbia Pictures and Paramount Studios.

== Career ==
Anxious to be a producer, Friedman acquired the film rights to the 1966 novel The Last Picture Show by Larry McMurtry. The film was nominated for eight Oscars, including the Academy Award for Best Picture. Three years later, he scripted and produced Lovin' Molly, also adapted from a McMurtry novel, and followed this with producing credits on Slap Shot (1977), Fast Break (1979), Hero at Large (1980), Little Darlings (1980), The Incubus (1981), and Eye of the Needle (1981).

Friedman's first film produced in conjunction with Kings Road Entertainment (formerly Kings Road Productions) was All of Me with Steve Martin and Lily Tomlin. Additional credits at Kings Road include The Best of Times (1986) with Robin Williams and Kurt Russell, The Big Easy (1987, nominated for the Independent Spirit Award for Best Film) with Dennis Quaid and Ellen Barkin, Jacknife (1989) with Robert De Niro and Ed Harris, and Kickboxer (1989) with Jean-Claude Van Damme. His final project was Mother (1995) with Diane Ladd and Olympia Dukakis.

In 1985, Kings Road Entertainment had a production pact with Tri-Star Pictures in order to distribute up to 12 pictures, after a previous contract with Universal Pictures expired. Also that year, he set up a foreign office for Kings Road Entertainment in order to handle in-house productions, as well as acquisitions for the studio, and took over operations for Terry Glinwood.

In 1986, it signed a television pact with ITC Entertainment to handle syndicated rights to then-upcoming theatrical motion pictures that would be handled by the studio for a multi-million dollar agreement. In 1987, Kings Road Entertainment had entered into a partnership with the New Century/Vista Film Corporation, in order to handle distribution of The Big Easy and Morgan Stewart's Coming Home in a twin pack.

That year, Kings Road Entertainment entered into the film distribution business in order to handle six in-house pictures and six acquisitions annually, and hired Leo Greenfield to serve as executive vice president of the studio and president of distribution; and joining Greenfield were Donald Smolen, who was senior vice president of advertising, and Henry Seggerman as senior vice president of production and acquisition, and the new Kings Road distribution office set up branches in New York, Los Angeles, Dallas, and Chicago in anticipation of the company's first pictures they are distributing.

== Death ==
Friedman died of multiple myeloma at home in Brentwood, California, at the age of 59.

In the years following Friedman's death, most of the Kings Road library would change hands several times, most recently to FilmRise and, currently, Lionsgate.

== Selected filmography ==
He was a producer in all films unless otherwise noted.

=== Film ===
Year	Film	Credit	Notes	Other notes
1971	The Last Picture Show			
1974	Lovin' Molly			
1977	Slap Shot			
1978	Bloodbrothers			
1979	Fast Break			
1980	Hero at Large			
1980	Little Darlings			
1981	Eye of the Needle			
1981	The Incubus	Executive producer		
1984	All of Me			
1985	Creator			
1985	Enemy Mine			
1986	Touch and Go			
1986	The Big Easy			
1987	Morgan Stewart's Coming Home			
1989	Kickboxer			Uncredited
1991	Kickboxer 2			
1992	Kickboxer 3			
1992	There Goes the Neighborhood			
1994	Kickboxer 4		Direct-to-video	Uncredited
1995	Redemption: Kickboxer 5		Direct-to-video	
1995	Mother	Executive producer	Direct-to-video	Final film as a producer

As writer

Year	Film
1974	Lovin' Molly

Miscellaneous crew

Year	Film	Role	Notes
1995	Mother	Presenter	Direct-to-video

Thanks

Year	Film	Role
1997	Mean Guns	Dedicated to the memory of

=== Television ===
Year	Title	Credit	Notes
1978	The President's Mistress	Executive producer	Television film
