= Fast Break (film) =

1979 film by Jack Smight

- Film poster by Jack Davis
- Directed by: Jack Smight
- Screenplay by: Sandor Stern
- Story by: Marc Kaplan
- Produced by: Stephen Friedman
- Starring: Gabe Kaplan; Harold Sylvester; Bernard King
- Edited by: Frank J. Urioste
- Music by: David Shire; James Di Pasquale
- Production company: Kings Road Entertainment
- Distributed by: Columbia Pictures
- Release date: February 23, 1979 (Los Angeles)
- Running time: 107 minutes
- Country: United States
- Language: English
- Budget: $3-3.5 million

Fast Break is a 1979 American sports comedy film directed by Jack Smight and produced by Stephen Friedman. The film stars Gabe Kaplan as David Greene, Harold Sylvester as D.C. and Bernard King as Hustler. The film was Kaplan's big-screen debut, although he had made earlier appearances on television sitcoms and movies, and was one of the first film appearances of Laurence Fishburne.

This film also featured the hit song "With You I'm Born Again" by Billy Preston and Syreeta, which was released in November 1979 and peaked at #4 on the Billboard Hot 100. The duo also recorded the film's theme song, "Go for It", released as a single in April of the same year. The film's soundtrack was released by Motown Records.

Smight called it "a very funny and profitable film."

== Plot ==
David Greene is a basketball fanatic living in Brooklyn, New York, who alternates his time between playing in neighborhood pickup basketball games and managing a delicatessen. Formerly a junior high-school coach, he dreams of making his living coaching basketball. He has sent numerous letters to colleges in the hope of fulfilling that dream—much to the chagrin of his long-suffering wife Jan, who wants only to buy a home and start a family.

Just when David thinks his dream will forever elude him, he is offered a dubious job coaching the men's basketball team at Cadwallader University, a fictional Nevada college. The job only pays $60 for each win, but David is promised a lucrative contract if he can lead Cadwallader to victory over Nevada State (one of the top 10 teams in the country). David accepts the job but is unable to convince his wife to join him in his cross-country quest, and David's marriage is therefore threatened as he pursues his dream.

David begins building his team with his friend Hustler, a talented baller and pool ace whose own fortunes turn sour when his "pigeons" realize they have been sharked. David and Hustler recruit Preacher, who also has good reason to escape his situation, as there is a contract out on him for having impregnated a powerful cult leader's 15-year-old daughter. Next, David and Hustler ferret out Hustler's acquaintance D.C., whom David recognizes as a former high-school star who has traded his chance at basketball glory to run numbers. Finally, David and Hustler visit Swish, a female finesse player with a great jump shot. David convinces the androgynous Swish to pose as a male in order to play on the team.

David and his newly formed quartet head west and immediately set about finding a suitable fifth man among the shallow talent pool of Cadwallader athletes. He settles on Sam Newton, nicknamed "Bull", who makes up in lane-clearing muscle what he lacks in basketball skills. Despite the team's cultural differences, David develops Cadwallader into a contender. The team ultimately catches the eye of Bo Winnegar, head coach of the elite team David must beat in order to make his coaching job a viable proposition. David must find a way to get Winnegar to agree to a game, which, as team manager Howard puts it, will be "like getting the Ohio State Buckeyes to play football with Radcliffe." Nevertheless, after the resourceful coach learns that Bo enjoys billiards, he enlists Hustler to set up a sting operation that forces Bo to agree to the game.

As the impossible matchup becomes a reality, David's team faces even bigger challenges. A hitman has tailed Preacher to Nevada, leaving Preacher to fear for his life as he takes the court. Just prior to tipoff, David makes a deal with a police officer to allow D.C. to play in the big game before answering to the law for his illegal activities. During the game, David's wife and mother show up to share in the realization of his lifelong dream.

== Cast ==
- Gabe Kaplan as David Greene
- Harold Sylvester as D.C.
- Randee Heller as Jan
- Michael Warren as Tommy "Preacher" White
- Bernard King as Leroy "Hustler" Monroe
- Bert Remsen as Bo Winnegar
- John Chappell as Alton Gutkas
- Reb Brown as Sam "Bull" Newton
- Richard Brestoff as Howard
- Mavis Washington as Roberta "Swish" James
- Laurence Fishburne as Street Kid

== Production ==
Prior to the shooting, the fictional Cadwallader team practiced for two weeks with UCLA assistant coach Jim Harrick, who was credited in the film as a technical advisor. Basketball court scenes were shot at Claremont Men's College in Claremont, California.

== Promotion ==
Columbia Pictures employed an unusual strategy to promote the film by sending out a press release that gave the impression that Cadwallader was a real university (complete with phone number and return address in Bunkerville, Nevada) that was presenting honorary degrees to, among others, Vice President Walter Mondale, singer Dolly Parton ("for her leadership in behalf of women's rights") and businessman Henry Ford II. Only after journalists and state officials began inquiring about the legitimacy of the university (and prospective students phoned to inquire about applications) did Columbia admit to the hoax.

== Reception ==
The film did well at the box office, grossing about $9.5 million in domestic rentals in its first six months of release against a budget of no more than 3.5 million.

Vincent Canby of The New York Times wrote of the film, "Though it's a nice movie, it's as instantly disposable as junk mail." Roger Ebert gave the film 2 stars out of 4 and wrote, "We've seen this formula so often that 'Fast Break' is almost like a rerun." Variety wrote, "'Fast Break' appears to be a telefilm that has wandered into the wrong arena. Likable in a rather harmless fashion, the Columbia Pictures release seems certain to turn up on the tube soon, after quickly exhausting the potential of major markets where its basketball theme could click." Gene Siskel of the Chicago Tribune gave the film 2.5 stars out of 4 and called it "something between a movie and a television show. It's like six segments of a weekly sitcom. That doesn't make it bad — it has some funny moments — but this is hardly the sort of material that justifies a hefty first-run ticket price." Charles Champlin of the Los Angeles Times wrote, "'Fast Break' is what they used to call a nice little picture, and Hollywood now usually makes them for television instead. It's literally fast, straightforward, [and] uncommonly well acted by a fresh and attractive cast." Gary Arnold of The Washington Post wrote, "'Fast Break,' a negligible but marginally entertaining sports comedy about a rags-to-riches college basketball team, is the sort of attraction that used to fill the bottom half of double bills. When it's over, you don't feel disappointed, but you're still waiting for the main feature to begin."

== See also ==
- List of basketball films
