= Kickboxer 3 =

- Official DVD cover
- Directed by: Rick King
- Written by: Dennis A. Pratt
- Produced by: Michael D. Pariser
- Starring: Sasha Mitchell; Dennis Chan; Richard Comar; Noah Verduzco; Alethea Miranda; Ian Jacklin
- Cinematography: Edgar Moura
- Edited by: Daniel Loewenthal
- Music by: Harry Manfredini
- Production company: Kings Road Entertainment
- Distributed by: Live Entertainment (U.S.); Vision International (Non-U.S.)
- Release date: September 4, 1992
- Running time: 92 minutes
- Country: United States
- Languages: English; Portuguese
- Budget: $5 million

Kickboxer 3 (stylized on-screen as Kickboxer III: The Art of War and released in Germany as Karate Tiger 6: Entscheidung in Rio) is a 1992 American martial arts film directed by Rick King. The film is the third entry in the Kickboxer film series with only Sasha Mitchell and Dennis Chan returning from the previous films. It was also the last film to feature Dennis Chan as Xian Chow.

== Plot ==
A young woman flees through the jungle while attempting to escape from Frank Lane, an American running an illegal child sex ring operation in Brazil. Upon being recaptured, she is taken back to Lane's home and executed in front of the other slaves as punishment. Her body is later shown washed up on a beach.

Meanwhile, kickboxing champion David Sloan and his trainer Xian arrive in Rio de Janeiro for a championship bout. Though Xian is focused on training for the upcoming fight, David dismisses the idea in favor of relaxing in the city. While eating lunch, their camera is suddenly stolen by a young thief, and David gives chase. After fighting off a pair of drunken assailants, he catches up to the boy who then brandishes a knife, but David easily disarms him and takes back the camera. When the boy, Marcos, follows him back to the restaurant to reclaim the knife, Xian invites both him and his beautiful sister Isabella to join them for lunch, and they eventually become friends.

At a charity kickboxing event, David is asked to be the cornerman for another young fighter in an exhibition match against Eric Martine, an Argentine kickboxer managed by Lane, who also happens to be David's opponent for the championship fight. However, the aggressive Martine brutally beats the young fighter, prompting David to physically intervene. As a result, David's bout with Martine is billed as a grudge match. Lane apologizes to David for Martine's actions and invites him to a party he is hosting.

David attends the party with Marcos and Isabella as his personal guests. Upon meeting her, Lane becomes infatuated with Isabella. After David parts ways with the children for the night, Lane secretly sends out a group of men to kidnap her. In a panic, Marcos asks for David's help. They file a police report, but with an overwhelming backlog of unsolved cases on their hands, the authorities do not consider their case a priority and advise them to simply forget about Isabella.

Undeterred, David and Xian launch their own investigation, which ultimately leads to their arrest. Lane bails them out in an attempt to cover his tracks, but the two continue their search. They purchase guns from an arms dealer and infiltrate a mansion owned by a pimp named Branco, eventually discovering that Lane is behind the child sex ring operation. They confront him in his home but are ambushed and taken prisoner. Lane and his henchman Pete force David through a series of grueling exercises designed to weaken him before his match with Martine, such as hiking with a backpack full of rocks and water-skiing without skis. He then releases both men back to their hotel, warning that if David doesn't show up for the fight, Isabella will disappear forever. With Marcos' help, Xian is able to create and administer a cure for David's fatigue.

At the fight, David faces Martine in a wild brawl that spills outside the ring before David proves victorious. Lane attempts to flee with Isabella but Xian intercepts them and rescues her. Lane, who wagered his entire estate upon Martine's victory, is left bankrupt and Pete ultimately deserts him. Upon being reunited with Marcos, Isabella tells him about the other girls Lane has imprisoned, and David resolves to free them as well. In retaliation, Lane pulls a gun on David, but Marcos suddenly appears and stabs Lane in the stomach with his knife.

The police sergeant decides to cover up Lane's murder, and David arranges for Marcos and Isabella to attend school. Upon realizing that they have missed their flight back home, David, Xian, and the police sergeant decide to go out for drinks together.

== Cast ==
- Sasha Mitchell as David Sloane, a world champion kickboxer and the youngest of the Sloane brothers
- Dennis Chan as Xian Chow, David's Muay Thai Kru
- Richard Comar as Frank Lane, an American child prostitution ring runner in Rio
- Noah Verduzco as Marcos, a young orphan living on the streets of Rio
- Alethea Miranda as Isabella, Marcos's sister
- Ian Jacklin as Eric Martine, a vicious and reckless Argentine kickboxer fighting for Lane and Sloane's opponent
- Milton Goncalves as Sergeant
- Ricardo Petraglia as Alberto
- Gracindo Júnior as Pete, Lane's enforcer
- Miguel Oniga as Marcelo
- Lolo Souza Pinto as Margarida
- Renato Coutinho as Branco, Lane's business partner
- Kate Lyra as Branco's Wife
- Manitou Felipe as Machado
- Shuki Ron as Reinaldo
- Bernardo Jablonski as Father Bozano
- Fabio Junqueira as Brumado
- Nildo Parente as Vargas
- Angelo DeMatos as Doctor
- Sergio Jesus as Walter "Big Walter"
- Renata Roriz as Attractive Woman
- Charles Myara as Milton
- Frank Santos as Henrique
- Monique Lafond as Flavia
- Marco Ruas as Jealous Husband At Party

== Production ==
In an interview with Sam Weisberg for the web site Hidden Films, director Rick King said working with Sasha Mitchell was extremely difficult, with frequent temper tantrums and even threats of violence: "I think he thought people thought he was stupid, which was true. And he was also violent, and so he used his position of privilege as the star in a very negative way".

== Reception ==
The film was not well received by critics: one reviewer found it was the worst of the whole series; other commentators, that the film was pointless or, being lighter than Kickboxer 2, silly and making no sense at times. Another review judged it was different from the first two instalments, but rather enjoyable despite its bad acting. A review for The Daily Grindhouse stated, however: "this is a fun movie with a good balance of hatable villainy, goofy heroism and weird touches like the reverse training montage".
