= Island of the Dead (2000 film) =

- Directed by: Tim Southam
- Written by: Peter Koper
- Produced by: Shauna Shapiro Jackson; Christine Kavanagh; Peter Koper; Luciano Lisi; Bruce Weiss
- Starring: Malcolm McDowell; Talisa Soto; Bruce Ramsay; Kent McQuaid; Mos Def; Paul Hopkins; Tyrone Benskin; Michel Perron
- Cinematography: Daniel Jobin
- Music by: Gaëtan Gravel; Serge LaForest
- Release date: July 2000 (Fantasia International Film Festival)
- Country: Canada
- Language: English
- Budget: $3 million

Island of the Dead is a 2000 Canadian horror film written by Peter Koper and directed by Tim Southam. Malcolm McDowell stars with Talisa Soto and Bruce Ramsay. The film also features a track by rapper Mos Def.

== Background ==
Ten years prior to the film's release, journalist Peter Koper wrote a feature article about Hart Island, where approximately one million New Yorkers were buried since 1869, including the homeless, the poor, and other "undesirables".

Director Tim Southam was a newcomer to the horror genre and decided to take a fresh approach to the film, turning to filmmakers such as Ang Lee, Terrence Malick, and Andrei Tarkovsky for inspiration.

== Plot ==
The story centers around a group of people that arrive at Hart Island, which has recently been purchased by real estate tycoon Rupert King to build what he calls Hope City, supposedly to help the poor and homeless of the city. The only problem is that the City of New York has been burying their unknown and unclaimed dead there since 1869. The group of people include King along with his personal assistant, a New York cop looking for a missing girl's body, and some employees from the Department of Corrections with inmates used to bury the unknown dead.

Initially, the personal assistant goes missing after being attacked by what appears to be a swarm of aggressive flies. Later, he's found dead and badly decomposed. Large maggots feed on the corpse. The flies continue to attack, picking off the party one by one. When the group realizes the danger, they desperately try to escape.

== Cast ==
- Malcolm McDowell – Rupert King
- Talisa Soto – Melissa O'Keefe
- Bruce Ramsay – Tony Matos
- Kent McQuaid – James Neely
- Mos Def – Robbie J
- Paul Hopkins – Rodger Mackloe
- Tyrone Benskin – Dwight Truman
- Michel Perron – Captain Chanon
