= Class of 1999 II: The Substitute =

1994 American science fiction film

- Directed by: Spiro Razatos
- Written by: Mark Sevi
- Produced by: Russell D. Markowitz
- Starring: Sasha Mitchell; Caitlin Dulany; Nick Cassavetes
- Cinematography: Dean Lent
- Edited by: David Kern
- Music by: Andrew Keresztes
- Production company: CineTel Films
- Distributed by: Vidmark Entertainment
- Release date: March 29, 1994
- Running time: 87 minutes
- Country: United States
- Language: English

Class of 1999 II: The Substitute is a 1994 direct-to-video film about a new teacher at a troubled inner city school, where the students are all involved in gangs, drugs, and violence. It was directed by stunt expert Spiro Razatos, and stars Sasha Mitchell as renegade teacher John Bolen.

The film is the third in series that began with Class of 1984 and continued with Class of 1999. The plots of the three films are only loosely related to each other; Class of 1999 II does contain some flashback sequences that use footage from Class of 1999.

== Plot ==
John Bolen is the new substitute teacher at a high school in Bend, Oregon. After seeing punks ditching class, he confronts them. When the lead punk pulls a knife, John uses martial arts to dispatch the students. The principal threatens to have John fired for his actions that morning, but John kills him by breaking his neck. Meanwhile, the punks wait in their car until school is over to confront John. John gets the upper hand by chaining the doors so they cannot escape and throws a grenade in the car, causing it to explode. Afterwards, John is in his car, eating his dinner, when he sees an advertisement for a military museum in Monroeville, California. In Monroeville, teacher Jenna McKenzie is getting heat from the school administration because she witnessed gang leader Sanders pull a gun on a student. Sanders repeatedly harasses Jenna into not testifying against him in court. However, Jenna's boyfriend, Emmett Grazer, tends to be there to chase Sanders away, much to the chagrin of Jenna, who feels she does not need constant protection.

Arriving to teach his class, John finds trouble in the form of rebel student Tiller. When a fellow student drops a book, John hits the floor and begins to hear gunfire in his head. He finds the book to be Tiller's and sends him to the principal's office. Tiller goes to the roof of the school to take a hit of the drug "edge". John shows up and throws Tiller off the roof. Tiller attempts to hang onto the flagpole, but his hands slip, and he dies. The next day, Jenna goes out for a jog. Sanders and some of his goons then begin to again harass her. When Sanders leaves his boys to attack Jenna, John shows up and saves her. While taking Jenna's report, sheriff Tom Yost notices John sporting a tattoo for Special Forces. When Tom asks John about a military background, John walks away.

Emmett is in charge of the small military museum and, as a military expert, is planning a paintball competition between the students. John begins to show interest in Emmett's military gear but is still hesitant of revealing who he really is. Meanwhile, a man named G.D. Ash is reporting on the incidents that occurred at Kennedy High School two years before involving android instructors malfunctioning and killing the students. John teaches Jenna about military tactics and quotes. To make sure Jenna is safe, John hunts down a member of Sanders' gang and uses martial arts before chaining him to a wall and setting him on fire. The day of the paintball competition, John wages war on everyone and even targets Emmett and Jenna. He kills troublemaking students, and when Jenna is once again confronted by Sanders, John arrives again, but this time to kill Sanders and his gang.

Jenna confronts John, who reveals he is a military android. When G.D. Ash. arrives, he reveals that John is not an android, but rather the son of Dr. Bob Forrest, the creator of the killer android teachers. John had served in the Special Forces and has suffered from post traumatic stress disorder to the point where he actually believes that he is an android. John is actually sporting a new brand of body armor, making him impervious to bullets and blades. Ash is then killed by John. When John and Jenna end up in Emmett's military bunker, John intends to kill both himself and Jenna by planting a bomb. However, Emmett makes the save, and he and Jenna escape. John, however, arrives and shoots Emmett. Jenna shoots John in the head causing him to fall back into the bunker and die. Jenna covers Emmett and declares her love for him as the bunker explodes.

Two days later, Jenna is preparing for school and as she is on the phone with Emmett, opens her shirt to reveal she is wearing body armor, thanks to Emmett having a copy of the armor in his museum. Jenna says something John once uttered about preparing for battle as she prepares to begin her day.

== Cast ==
- Sasha Mitchell as John Bolen
- Caitlin Dulany as Jenna McKenzie
- Nick Cassavetes as Emmett Grazer
- Gregory West as Sanders
- Rick Hill as G.D. Ash
- Jack Knight as Sheriff Tom Yost
- Diego Serrano as "Ice"
- Berny Pock as Dennis Tiller
- Denney Pierce as Punk Leader
- Loring Pickering as High School Principal
- John Cathran Jr. as Monroe H.S. Principal
- Pete Antico as Dumb Kid
- Christopher Brown as "D"
- Eric Stabenau as Ray Buchanan
- Jean St. James as Ms. Buchanan
- Renie Millea as Teacher
- Ken Phillips as The Substitute
- Doc D. Charbonneau as Punk
- Phil Culotta as Punk
- Chris Durand as Punk
- Andy Gill as Youth

== Production ==
The film had a working title of Class of 2001: The Substitute, and retained that name for its French release. Accordingly, the character of G.D. Ash refers to the events of Class of 1999 as having occurred two years previously.

== Home media ==
Vidmark Entertainment released the film on videocassette in March 1994. It has not been released on DVD in Region 1, though there has been a Region 2 release. As of March 2022, the movie is available for rental or purchase on Amazon Prime Video.
