= Peter Koper =

American film producer (1947–2022)

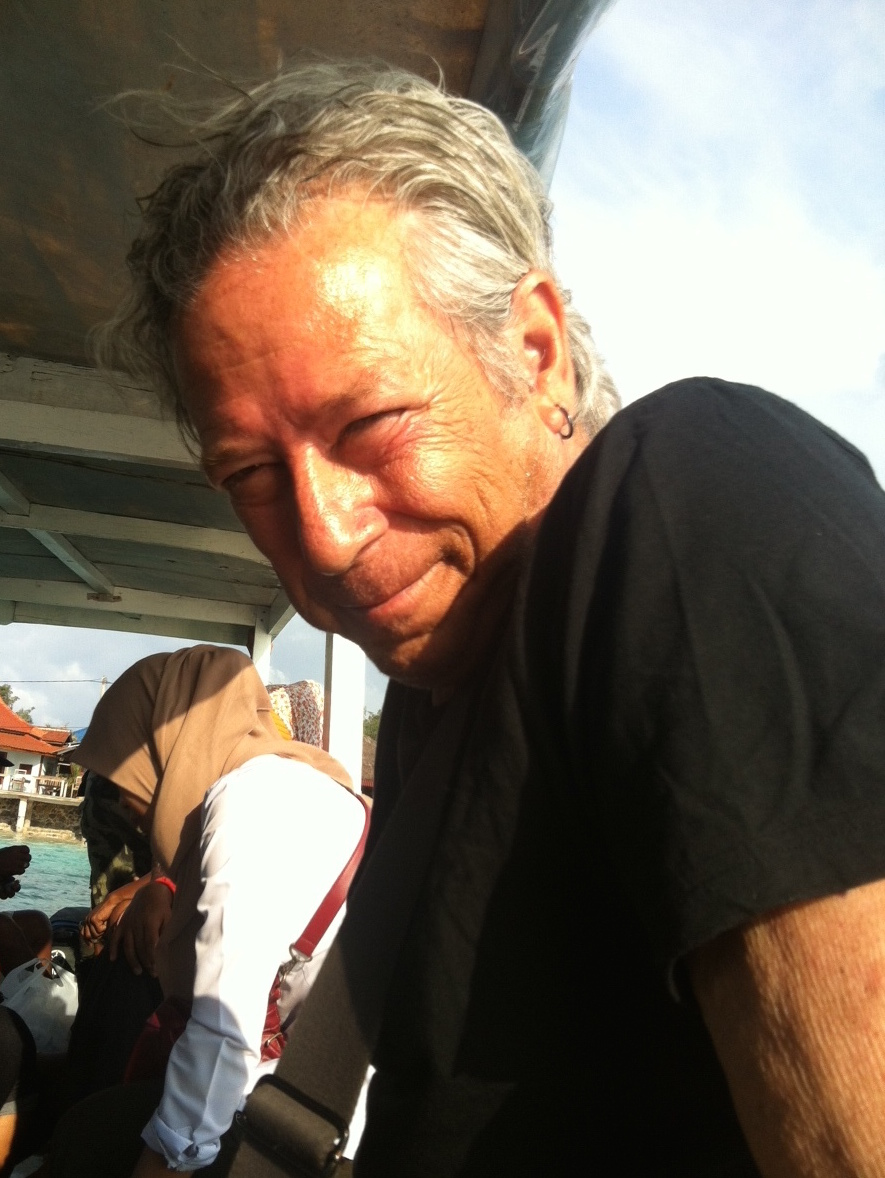
- Koper in Gili Meno, 2015
- Born: Peter Jan Koper; January 1947; Quakenbrück, Lower Saxony, Germany
- Died: May 21, 2022 (aged 75); New York City, New York, U.S.
- Citizenship: Poland; United States
- Education: Johns Hopkins University (BA); American University (MA)
- Occupations: Writer and producer
- Organization: Writers Guild of America, East
- Notable work: Headless Body in Topless Bar
- Television: America's Most Wanted
- Spouse: Gina Consoli Koper
- Parent(s): Antoni Koper and Sophie Maruiles Koper
- Awards: Santa Barbara International Film Festival's Peter Stark Prize for Screenwriting
- Website: www.peterkoper.com

Peter Koper (January 1947 – May 21, 2022) was an American journalist, professor, screenwriter, and producer. He numbers among the original Dreamlanders, the group of actors and artists who worked with independent filmmaker John Waters on his early films. He wrote for the United Feature Syndicate, Associated Press, Baltimore Sun, American Film, Rolling Stone, People and the website Splice Today. He worked as a staff writer and producer for America's Most Wanted, and has written television for Discovery Channel, Learning Channel, Paramount Television and Lorimar Television. Koper wrote and co-produced the cult movie Headless Body in Topless Bar, and wrote the screenplay for Island of the Dead. He has taught at the University of the District of Columbia, and Hofstra University.

== Early life and influences ==
Koper was born in 1947 in British-occupied Quakenbrück, Germany, to Polish resistance fighter Antoni Koper and Holocaust survivor and nurse Sophie Koper. His father's name appears on the Walls of Honor in Yad Vashem's Garden of the Righteous Among the Nations, while his mother was Jewish. In 1952, his family emigrated to the United States, living first in Pacific Grove, California. In 1958, the family relocated to Washington, D.C., where his father worked for the United States Information Agency.

At the age of sixteen, Koper attended the March on Washington for Jobs and Freedom (28 August 1963), where he heard Joan Baez and Bob Dylan sing and heard Martin Luther King Jr., deliver his "I Have a Dream" speech. Fifty years later, Koper recalled how the crowd had fallen silent as King began to speak, and how his words had made it seem like the struggle for civil rights could be won.

In 1965, Koper matriculated at Johns Hopkins University. There, he co-edited The News-Letter. Author Richard Ben Cramer, a freshman when he began at The News-Letter in 1967, remembered Koper as a role model, one of the "giants" to whom he hoped he would someday "measure up." While still a student, Koper also took his first job as a paid reporter, for the Baltimore Afro-American. For "the Afro," Koper covered such historic events as the demonstration to release the group of draft protesters known as the Catonsville Nine. Later that same day, Koper covered a political rally for segregationist presidential hopeful George Wallace inside the Baltimore Civic Center, and the subsequent spontaneous demonstration against Wallace outside. In the confusion, he was caught up in a group of a hundred and fifty demonstrators, whom police dispersed with dogs. Koper was arrested by police, in spite of presenting his press credentials, and charged with "failing to obey a reasonable and lawful request of a police officer." A municipal court judge ultimately dismissed the charge. He was graduated from Johns Hopkins in 1969 with a B.A. in the humanities.

== Dreamlander years ==
While a student at Johns Hopkins University, Koper lived off-campus in the Fell's Point neighborhood of Baltimore. There, he first met filmmaker John Waters at the Hollywood Bakery, a communal studio and living space founded by Vincent Peranio, a Maryland Institute College of Art graduate who would serve as production designer for many Waters films. Koper recalls how, in 1968, shortly before Waters made Mondo Trasho, the group later known as the Dreamlanders coalesced from three distinct groups: recent Maryland Institute College of Art alumni, many of whom lived at the Hollywood Bakery; the Johns Hopkins University literary set, including Koper himself; and Waters' friends from Baltimore's suburbs by way of Baltimore's gay scene, including Divine. "We weren't hippies by any stretch of the imagination," Koper remembered. "It was much more like...freaks is what we called ourselves, and it was sort of a coming together of all the misfits and malcontents and juvenile delinquents."

After what one contemporary called "several frantic years in Fells Point," Koper sought a quieter life, and purchased a twenty-six acre farm twenty-five miles north of Baltimore in Hampstead, Maryland. As Waters began production on Desperate Living, he asked Koper if he could build the sets for the Mortville exteriors there. Koper agreed, on the condition that "every trace of Mortville vanish when filming was completed." Production designer Vince Peranio was soon constructing a plywood castle and a slum of rubbish along Koper's otherwise bucolic farm lane. Production manager Robert Maier recalls the challenges of the location, including flooded dirt roads and limited septic facilities, acknowledging Koper's patience throughout the ordeal. Koper also portrayed one of Queen Carlotta's goons in the film.

When Koper married designer Gina Consoli, then working for artist Andy Warhol at Interview, Waters served as best man. Years later, Waters and Koper recounted for Warhol how Waters had hired an old school bus for Koper's bachelor's party, a tour of "every low strip joint in Baltimore." In reply, Warhol asked, "Are there any high strip joints?" The couple were married at a pier rented from the city of Baltimore for fifty dollars. After the wedding, much of the party adjourned to Koper's farm in Hampstead for their annual summer croquet tournament.

In 1981, Peter and Gina Koper relocated to New York, where they purchased an unfinished industrial loft on Prince Street in Lower Manhattan, north of Little Italy and east of SoHo. Cultural commentator John Strausbaugh described the area at that time as "a no-name wasteland of dark streets prowled by Bowery winos, heroin addicts and Mafia block capos." Gina told Strausbaugh they called it UhOh, "...as in 'Uh oh we're out of bread.' There was no place to buy groceries. You could walk to some artist's place to buy a $200,000 painting, but you couldn't buy a quart of milk that wasn't sour."

== Academia and journalism ==
After his graduation from Johns Hopkins University, Koper covered the police beat for the Associated Press. More than twenty-five years later, he explained, "I love low-life."

Koper accepted his first academic position at the University of the District of Columbia in 1972, where he served as an assistant professor in the communications department until the fall of 1980. While there he defended the university's liberal open admissions policy. In 1973, he received a Master of Arts from American University.

While teaching, Koper continued his journalism career. His 1978 article about the emerging recreational use of the dissociative drug phencyclidine, also known as PCP, was among the early reporting on the topic, and was later cited by scholars. In 1979, he began writing for the alternative weekly Baltimore City Paper. The newspaper's co-founder Russ Smith remembers the day they met. "Peter Koper was one of the first 'name' writers to wander into my office...to pitch a story." His debut story was a parody of the monthly magazine Baltimore. Koper gained a reputation as the "staff troublemaker," and Smith recalls several late-night adventures with Koper on the streets of Baltimore.

Beginning in 1980, Koper worked for two years as a syndicated writer and foreign correspondent for Independent News Alliance/United Feature Syndicate. For United Features, Koper traveled to Port-au-Prince, Haiti to shadow Aubelin Jolicoeur for a day, and reported on the underground free press from Warsaw during a period of martial law in Poland. In 1982, when twenty-eight people killed themselves after they had reportedly watched the Russian roulette scenes in the film The Deer Hunter, Koper asked the question, "Can movies kill?" in an influential article published by the American Film Institute's American Film.

In September 1980, Koper assumed an assistant professorship in the communications arts department at Hofstra University. One of his students, television writer and producer Dean Young, called Koper's classes memorable, and credited Koper, together with another Hofstra professor, with having had a "profound" influence on his own decision to become a television writer. Media advocate Jaci Clement also remembers Koper as one of her favorite professors at Hofstra, and his demanding classes as the "best training to prepare me for working in a newsroom." Koper's influence didn't end at the classroom door either, according to Clement: "...anywhere near the media center, he would track me down and ask what I had written that day. His rule was you had to write something, anything, every day. If you didn't, he'd follow you around, nipping at your heels like a Jack Russell Terrier until he made you miserable. It was simply easier to do the writing." Koper taught at Hofstra University until 1986. Koper has also served as an assistant adjunct professor in the film division at Columbia University.

In 2017, Koper became a regular contributor to the website Splice Today.

== Film, television, and theatre ==
In 1981, Koper played an uncredited role in the production of John Waters' film Polyester, arranging financing from other investors as well as investing his own money, with which he trusted Waters "like an old penny-pinching aunt." He also helped Waters develop the concept of the scratch-and-sniff Odorama cards distributed to the audience.

Koper received co-screenplay credit for his contributions to the Kathy Acker script on which director Bette Gordon based her 1983 arthouse film Variety.

On April 15, 1983, Koper read Vincent Musetto's now famous headline in the New York Post: "Headless Body in Topless Bar." The headline inspired Koper to begin writing a screenplay loosely based on the facts of the story, with the headline as its title. Remembering the years that followed, Koper said, "If my life were a newspaper, this would be splashed on page one: 'Screenwriter Haunted by Headless Headline.'"

During a four-year stint working full-time as a staff writer and producer for Fox Television's America's Most Wanted in the early 1990s, Koper first worked with director James Bruce, scripting "a dozen offbeat vignettes about murder and mayhem." During that time, Koper never forgot the Musetto headline, shaping the story through retelling, and "turning it into a story of his own." Koper wrote the story for the stage before developing the screenplay, and collaborated again with Bruce to realize it. In May 1995, Headless Body in Topless Bar appeared at the 48th Cannes Film Festival's Marché du Film.

Headless Body in Topless Bar opened in New York and Los Angeles to mixed reviews. Stephen Holden of the New York Times credited the cast's "fine ensemble acting" with "disguising the screenplay's long-windedness." Bob Strauss of the Los Angeles Daily News described the film as Paul Verhoeven's "Showgirls without the budget," criticizing both the screenplay produced by "Koper's tabloid ink-stained hands," and Bruce's "uncertain direction." John Anderson of the Los Angeles Times compared the film to Lifeboat and No Exit, "but without a certain delicacy." David Stratton of Variety described the film as "gripping," praised Bruce's "fluid direction" and predicted that "prospects look brighter for video release."

Headless Body in Topless Bar was well received in Germany, where it was remembered as one of two "magnificent film highlights" from the Oldenburg International Film Festival, then in its second year, and Koper was a touted guest of the festival in subsequent years. Körper ohne Kopf in Oben-ohne-Bar, German dramatist Klaus Pohl's German translation of Koper's original script for the stage, premiered at the Deutsches Schauspielhaus in Hamburg, Germany on 11 November 1999. One reviewer found the play "reminiscent" of Quentin Tarantino films.

In 1996, Koper took up seasonal residence in the Long Island hamlet of Springs, New York, where he became interested in the story of the four Nazi saboteurs who disembarked from a U-boat on the morning of June 13, 1942, to land on Amagansett's Atlantic Avenue Beach, then boarded the Long Island Rail Road bound for Manhattan as part of a plan to attack the United States. A Coast Guardsman foiled the plot; upon encountering the invaders, he ran back to the Amagansett Coast Guard Station and raised the alarm, "The Nazis have landed!" Medienboard Berlin-Brandenburg commissioned Koper to write a screenplay about the Nazi misadventure, entitled Code Name: Pastorius. Koper said he relied on the military trial transcripts housed at the National Archives to fully understand the story, and tried to capture the story's inherent dark humor. In 2011, the East Hampton Historical Society staged a reading of the screenplay at Mulford Farmhouse to raise funds to restore the Amagansett Coast Guard Station.

A second Long Island landmark captured Koper's interest as well, inspiring another screenplay. By 1998, he was circling Hart Island, New York in a dinghy, imagining the "modern ghost town" and paupers' graveyard as the backdrop for Island of the Dead, the horror film the island inspired him to write.

Koper won the 2001 Santa Barbara International Film Festival's Peter Stark Screenwriting competition for his screenplay Joyful Noise.

In 2004, the Medienboard Berlin-Brandenburg honored Koper with a second commission, this time to write a dark romantic comedy about capital punishment entitled The Executioner in Love.

In 2016, Koper wrote and co-produced the documentary Trump Tribe, filmed at that year's Republican National Convention in Cleveland, Ohio, and featuring seventeen voters who speak candidly about their zeal for the presidential candidacy of Donald Trump. The film uses the "formal structure of anthropological study to divide Trump supporters into groups such as Myth Keepers, Tribal Women, Tribal Elders, and Tribal Youth."

== Filmography ==
=== Television ===
Year	Title	Network	Credit	Notes
2003	The New Detectives	Discovery Channel	Writer	"Beltway Sniper"
2000-2002	The Prosecutors	Discovery Channel	Writer	1 episode
2000-2002	The FBI Files	Discovery Channel	Writer	5 episodes; writing as "Stephan Cooper"
2000-2002	Busted	Animal Planet	Writer	12 episodes
2000	More Tales from the Tower	The Learning Channel	Writer and producer	3 episodes
1998	Tales from the Tower	The Learning Channel	Writer and producer	3 episodes
1997	Shoot to Thrill	The Learning Channel	Writer and producer	1 episode
1996	Royal Secrets	The Learning Channel	Writer and producer	13 episodes
1995-1997	Castle Ghosts	The Learning Channel	Producer	4 episodes; New York Festival Silver TV Award winner
1995-1996	Land's End	Paramount Television	Writer	
1990-1994	America's Most Wanted	Fox Broadcasting Company	Staff writer and producer	Credited with scripting more than 160 dramatic reenactment segments
1992	Limousine Service	Playboy Channel	Writer	Video short
1991	Ladykiller	Fox Broadcasting Company	Writer	One-hour special
1990	Love Connection	Lorimar Television	Writer and producer	

=== Film ===
Year	Title	Distributor	Credit	Notes
2016	Trump Tribe	JBD Productions	Writer and co-producer	
2004	The Executioner in Love	Unproduced	Writer	Commissioned by Medienboard Berlin-Brandenburg
2002	Code Name: Pastorius	Unproduced	Writer	Commissioned by Medienboard Berlin-Brandenburg
2001	Joyful Noise	Unproduced	Writer	Winner of Peter Stark Screenwriting Competition 2001, Santa Barbara International Film Festival
2000	Island of the Dead	Unapix Films/Showcase Entertainment	Writer and executive producer	Featured at Fantasia International Film Festival and Oldenburg International Film Festival
1995	Headless Body in Topless Bar	Northern Arts Entertainment	Writer and producer	Featured at Seattle International Film Festival
1991	Two Evil Eyes	Overseas Film Group/Taurus Entertainment	Screenplay rewrite	Uncredited
1996	Variety	ZDF German Television/Channel 4 London	Co-screenplay	Showcased at Directors Fortnight, Cannes; Installed in permanent film collection, Whitney Museum of American Art in 1996
1984	Death Sentence	20th Century Fox	Dialogue, subtitles	
1981	Polyester	New Line Cinema	Producer	Uncredited
