= Prison Stories: Women on the Inside =

1991 American drama film

- Genre: Drama
- Written by: Dick Beebe; Martin Jones; Marlane Meyer; Jule Selbo
- Directed by: Donna Deitch; Joan Micklin Silver; Penelope Spheeris
- Starring: Rae Dawn Chong; Lolita Davidovich; Annabella Sciorra; Talisa Soto; Rachel Ticotin
- Composers: Stanley Clarke; Willie Colón; Jack Hues; J. Peter Robinson
- Country of origin: United States
- Original language: English

Production
- Executive producers: Colin Callender; Francine Lefrak
- Producer: Gerald T. Olson
- Cinematography: Robert Elswit; Jamie Thompson
- Running time: 79 minutes
- Production company: HBO Showcase

Original release
- Network: HBO
- Release: January 26, 1991

Prison Stories: Women on the Inside is a 1991 American drama film directed by Donna Deitch, Joan Micklin Silver and Penelope Spheeris and written by Dick Beebe, Martin Jones, Marlane Meyer and Jule Selbo. The film stars Rae Dawn Chong, Lolita Davidovich, Annabella Sciorra, Talisa Soto and Rachel Ticotin. The film premiered on HBO on January 26, 1991.

== Cast ==
- Rae Dawn Chong as Rhonda
- Lolita Davidovich as Loretta Wright
- Annabella Sciorra as Nicole
- Talisa Soto as Rosina
- Rachel Ticotin as Iris
- Leontine Guilliard as Colleen
- Debi Parker as Dee
- Sharon Schaffer as Ibi
- Sandy Martin as Counselor Pennell
- Robert Wallach as Guard Rae
- Terri Hanauer as Wanda
- Edwin Maldonado Jr. as Mico
- Raymond Cruz as Montoya
- Lorraine Morin-Torre as Carmen
- Jennifer Rhodes as Warden Blakely
- Kevin Duffis as Guard Hollins
- Myra Turley as Guard Paula
- Edith Fields as Rose
- Virginia Keehne as Molly
- Elisabeth Moss as Little Molly
- Daniel Riordan as Husband
- Joel Swetow as Counselor D'Amico
- Gillian Bagwell as Janice
- Marlon Taylor as Lemarr
- John Freeland as Guard Huxtable
- Mae E. Campbell as Guard Johnson
- Lois DeBanzie as Mrs. Benzinger
- Paul Collins as Mr. Olney
- Al White as Mr. Chesler
- Moe Bertran as Rodriguez
- Ken Butler as Correction Officer Heath
- Silvana Gallardo as Mercedes
- Francesca P. Roberts as Lucy
- Kimberly Scott as Stacy
- Grace Zabriskie as Genevieve
