= Headless Body in Topless Bar =

1995 American film by James Bruce

- Theatrical release poster
- Directed by: James Bruce
- Screenplay by: Peter Koper
- Based on: a New York Post headline by Vincent Musetto
- Produced by: Rustam Branaman; Stephen David; Charles Weinberger
- Starring: Raymond J. Barry; Jennifer McDonald
- Cinematography: Kevin Morrisey
- Edited by: Robert Barrere
- Music by: Charlie Barnett
- Production company: Green Tea Pictures
- Distributed by: Northern Arts Entertainment
- Release dates: May 20, 1995 (Cannes); February 16, 1996 (United States)
- Running time: 110 minutes
- Country: USA
- Language: English
- Budget: $400,000

Headless Body in Topless Bar is a 1995 American black comedy film directed by James Bruce and written by Peter Koper. The ensemble cast includes Raymond J. Barry, Rustam Branaman, Jennifer McDonald, Taylor Nichols, and David Selby. The film's title is taken from a 1983 headline in the New York Post written by Vincent Musetto, and the plot is loosely based on the events that inspired the headline.

== Plot ==
The action unfolds in a shabby New York strip bar in real time. While a bartender dispenses drinks, a topless dancer moves listlessly on stage for a handful of patrons: a businessman, two hockey fans, and an old man using a wheelchair. A Man enters and announces a stick-up. As the bartender reaches for a gun, the Man shoots and kills him.

A night of psychological terror unfolds as the moods of the Man swing unpredictably between the friendly and the murderous. Forcing the group to play a game called "Nazi Truth", he humiliates the hostages as he peels away their inner secrets.

Disrupting the situation, a young woman arrives to pick up her friend, the topless dancer, and is taken hostage along with the others. As the game of "Nazi Truth" continues, the Man reveals his own secret: as a youth he was raped in jail.

Discovering the young woman is a mortician's assistant, the Man suddenly explodes into a manic episode, obsessed with erasing evidence of his crime. Failing to extract the bullet from the bartender's skull, he forces the young woman to sever the bartender's head. He binds the hostages and puts plastic bags on their heads. Satisfied, he takes the head in a box and leaves.

The hostages, suffocating and struggling for breath, are finally able to rip off their plastic hoods. They burst outside, uncertain what to do. Traumatized, they each go their separate ways, never calling the police.

== Cast ==
- Raymond J. Barry as The Man
- Rustam Branaman as Vic Palmer
- Jennifer MacDonald as Candy
- Taylor Nichols as Danny
- Paul Williams as Carl Levin
- David Selby as Bradford Lumpkin
- April Grace as Letitia Jackson
- Biff Yeager as Joe
- Tom Bresnahan as Drunk (credited as Tom Bresnahan)
- Deborah De Voto as Dancer

== Production ==
Vincent Musetto's famous headline first inspired writer and co-producer Peter Koper when it appeared in the New York Post in 1983. Koper, who called headlines the "haikus of our times," developed the screenplay with the headline as its title over the next decade, after first scripting the material for the stage. Notwithstanding the title, Headless Body in Topless Bar is only loosely based on the facts in the original news story. Koper said the one "poetic" fact he gleaned from the news story is that the gunman, having discovered one of his hostages works as a mortician's assistant, forces her to remove the head from his victim's corpse.

Koper had first worked with director James Bruce four years earlier, collaborating on a dozen dramatic crime reenactments for Fox Television's America's Most Wanted, where Koper was a staff writer and producer.

Headless Body in Topless Bar was shot in eighteen days, three of which were spent shooting exteriors on location at the Baby Doll Lounge in Lower Manhattan. The remainder of the film was shot on a soundstage in Hollywood, California.

The ensemble cast worked for what Bruce and Koper called "hostage scale," earning Barry's pay for the day should they manage to steal the gun from him as per the plot. If they tried and failed, however, they paid their day's wages to Barry. Only Barry earned extra cash.

Bruce said he shot the film on a budget of four hundred thousand dollars.

== Release ==
Headless Body in Topless Bar first appeared at the 48th Cannes Film Festival's Marché du Film in May 1995. The film premiered in the United States the following month, at the 1995 Seattle International Film Festival. That fall, the film enjoyed its German premiere at the Oldenburg International Film Festival, where it was remembered as one of two "magnificent film highlights" from the festival's second year. On February 16, 1996, the film opened at the Quad Cinema in New York City. It opened on the West Coast in March 1996.

After previewing the film in Cannes, David Stratton of Variety called the film "intelligent", crediting "Bruce's fluid direction" and "excellent ensemble performances" for helping film avoid "theatrical tag," but he speculated that the title might deter the film's likely audience, and that "prospects look brighter for video release."

Like Stratton, Stephen Holden of the New York Times also praised the cast's "fine ensemble acting," compensating for what he considered a long-winded screenplay. Holden singled out Raymond Barry for imbuing the role of the killer with "a lithe, springy intensity, a glint of intelligence, and enough charm to keep the audience emotionally off balance." Holden was also impressed with Jennifer MacDonald's performance as the hard-shelled dancer.

Dave Kehr of the New York Daily News had no positive reactions to the film; he said the film fell into "the most profoundly depleted formula of the American stage", and compared the audience's experience to "being trapped in a bad Off-Broadway show without an intermission."

When the film was released in California, John Anderson of the Los Angeles Times compared it to Lifeboat and No Exit, and shared Kehr's assessment of the audience's experience.

Bob Strauss of the Los Angeles Daily News compared the work to that of Paul Verhoeven: "a sort of low-rent Showgirls."

== Translated for the German stage ==
German dramatist Klaus Pohl later translated Koper's original stage script into German. Körper ohne Kopf in Oben-ohne-Bar premiered at the Deutsches Schauspielhaus in Hamburg, Germany on 11 November 1999. One reviewer said the play was "reminiscent of Quentin Tarantino's films."
