= Licence to Kill =

1989 James Bond film directed by John Glen

- Theatrical release poster by Robin Behling
- Directed by: John Glen
- Written by: Michael G. Wilson; Richard Maibaum
- Based on: James Bond by Ian Fleming
- Produced by: Albert R. Broccoli; Michael G. Wilson
- Starring: Timothy Dalton; Carey Lowell; Robert Davi; Talisa Soto; Anthony Zerbe
- Cinematography: Alec Mills
- Edited by: John Grover
- Music by: Michael Kamen
- Production companies: Eon Productions; United Artists
- Distributed by: MGM/UA Communications Co. (United States); United International Pictures (International)
- Release dates: 13 June 1989 (London); 10 July 1989 (United Kingdom); 14 July 1989 (United States)
- Running time: 133 minutes
- Countries: United Kingdom; United States
- Language: English
- Budget: $32 million
- Box office: $156.1 million

Licence to Kill is a 1989 spy film, the sixteenth in the James Bond series produced by Eon Productions, and the second and final film to star Timothy Dalton as the MI6 agent James Bond. In the film, Bond resigns from MI6 in order to take revenge against the drug lord Franz Sanchez who ordered an attack against Bond's friend and CIA agent Felix Leiter and the murder of Felix's wife after their wedding.

Licence to Kill was the fifth and final Bond film directed by John Glen and the last to feature Robert Brown as M and Caroline Bliss as Miss Moneypenny. It was also the last to feature the work of screenwriter Richard Maibaum, title designer Maurice Binder and producer Albert R. Broccoli, who all died in the following years.

Licence to Kill was the first Bond film to not use the title of an Ian Fleming story. Originally titled Licence Revoked, the name was changed during post-production due to American test audiences associating the term with driving licences. Although the plot is largely original, it contains elements of the Fleming novel Live and Let Die and the short story "The Hildebrand Rarity", interwoven with a sabotage element influenced by Akira Kurosawa's film Yojimbo.

For budget reasons, Licence to Kill became the first Bond film shot entirely outside the United Kingdom: principal photography took place on location in Mexico and the United States, while interiors were filmed at Estudios Churubusco instead of Pinewood Studios. The film earned over $156 million worldwide and received generally positive reviews but criticism for the darker tone.

Licence to Kill was followed by GoldenEye in 1995, with Pierce Brosnan replacing Dalton as Bond.

== Plot ==
DEA agents collect MI6 agent James Bond and his friend, CIA agent Felix Leiter, on their way to Leiter's wedding in Key West, to have them assist in capturing drug lord Franz Sanchez. Bond and Leiter capture Sanchez by attaching a hook and cord to Sanchez's plane and pulling it out of the air with a Coast Guard helicopter. Afterwards, Bond and Leiter parachute down to the church in time for the ceremony.

Sanchez bribes DEA agent Ed Killifer and escapes while he is being transported. Meanwhile, Sanchez's henchman Dario and his crew ambush Leiter and his wife Della (murdering her in the process) and take Leiter to an aquarium owned by one of Sanchez's accomplices, Milton Krest. Sanchez has Leiter lowered into a tank holding a Tiger shark. When Bond learns that Sanchez has escaped, he returns to Leiter's house to find that Leiter has been tortured and that Della has been murdered. Bond, with Leiter's friend Sharkey, start their own investigation. They discover a marine research centre run by Krest, where Sanchez has hidden cocaine and a submarine for smuggling.

After Bond kills Killifer using the same shark tank used for Leiter, M meets Bond in Key West's Hemingway House and orders him to an assignment in Istanbul. Bond resigns after turning down the assignment, but M suspends Bond instead and revokes his licence to kill. Bond becomes a rogue agent, although he later receives unauthorised assistance from Q after Miss Moneypenny secretly contacts Q Branch, worried about Bond's disappearance.

Bond boards Krest's ship Wavekrest and stops Sanchez's latest drug shipment, stealing five million dollars in the process. He discovers that Sharkey has been killed by Sanchez's henchmen. Bond meets and teams up with Pam Bouvier, a pilot and DEA informant, at a Bimini bar, and journeys with her to the Republic of Isthmus. He poses as a hitman for hire in order to scope Sanchez's office and make an assassination attempt. Two Hong Kong Narcotics Bureau officers, who were hoping to discover Sanchez's drug manufacturing and distribution plant, interrupt Bond's attempt and take him to an abandoned warehouse. Sanchez's men rescue him and kill the officers, believing them to be the assassins.

Later, Bond discovers that Bouvier had unsuccessfully attempted a deal with Sanchez's head of security, Heller, to surrender Sanchez's missiles in return for immunity. With the aid of Bouvier, Q, and Sanchez's girlfriend Lupe Lamora, Bond frames Krest for the assassination attempt and the earlier theft of Sanchez's $5 million by planting the money aboard the Wavekrest, to gain Sanchez's trust. Sanchez locks Krest in a decompression chamber and cuts the pressure line, causing Krest to explode. Bond is then admitted into the inner circle.

Sanchez takes Bond to his base of operations, which is disguised as the headquarters of a religious cult led by televangelist Joe Butcher. Bond learns that Sanchez's facility grinds and dissolves cocaine in petrol to smuggle it disguised as fuel to Asian drug dealers. Sanchez's business manager Truman-Lodge uses Butcher's TV broadcasts to communicate with Sanchez's customers in the United States. During Sanchez's presentation to potential Asian customers, Dario enters the room and recognises Bond. Bond starts a fire in the laboratory but is captured and placed on the conveyor belt that drops the cocaine bricks into a large industrial grinder. Bond distracts Sanchez by casting doubt on Heller's loyalty regarding the missiles. Bouvier arrives and shoots Dario, allowing Bond to kill him by pulling him into the grinder.

Sanchez, after killing Heller, flees with his men as fire destroys the base, taking with them four tankers of the dissolved cocaine. Bond pursues them by plane, with Bouvier at the controls. During a chase through the desert, Bond destroys three of the tankers and kills several of Sanchez's men. Sanchez kills Truman-Lodge in anger and attacks Bond with a machete aboard the fourth tanker, which crashes down a hillside. A petrol-soaked Sanchez attempts to kill Bond with his machete. Bond then reveals his cigarette lighter—his "best man" gift from Felix and Della—and sets Sanchez on fire, causing the tanker to explode and kill him. Bouvier arrives shortly afterward and picks up Bond.

Later, a party is held at Sanchez's former residence. Bond receives a call from Leiter telling him that M has congratulated him for his work and offers him his job back. He then rejects Lupe's advances and romances Bouvier instead.

== Cast ==
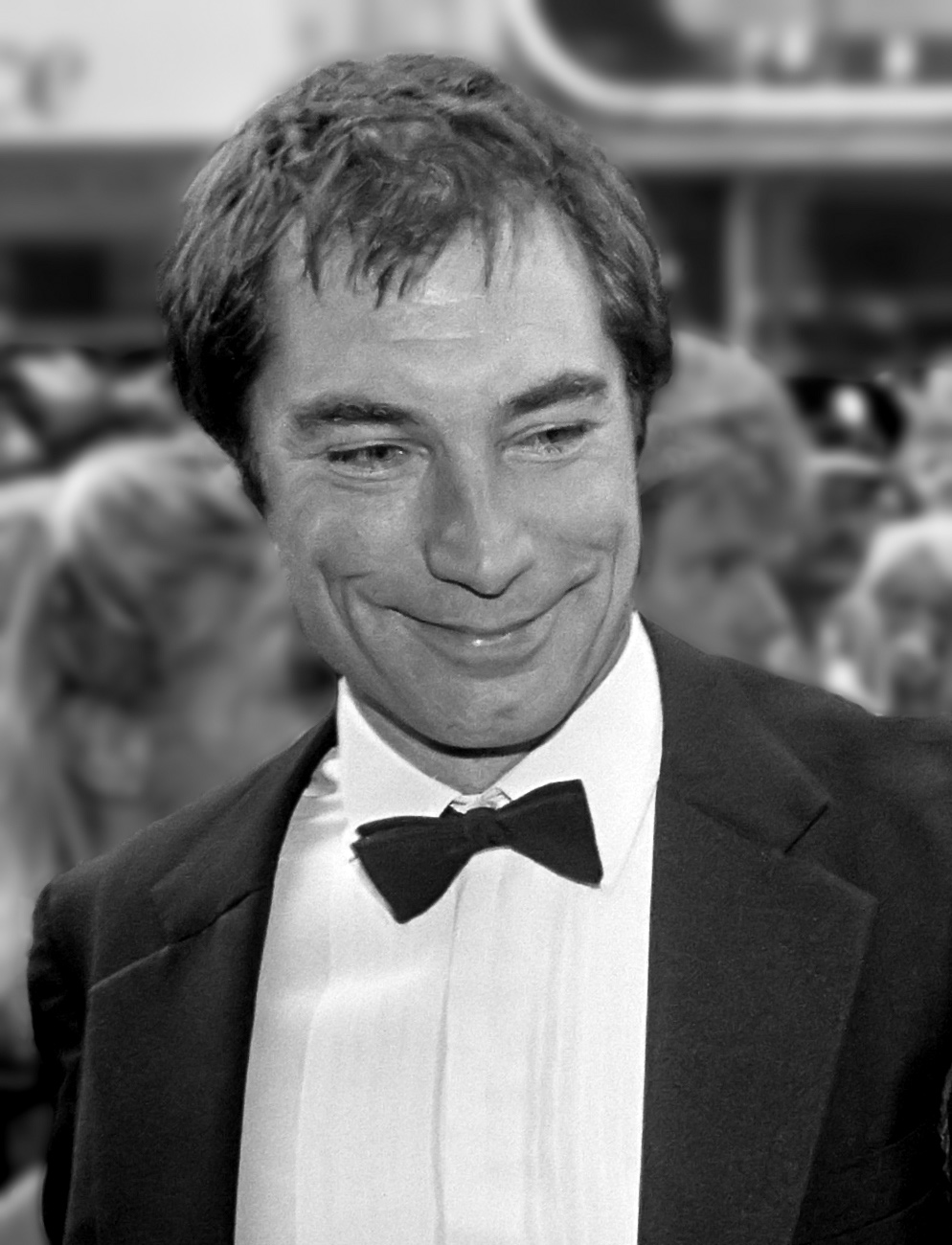
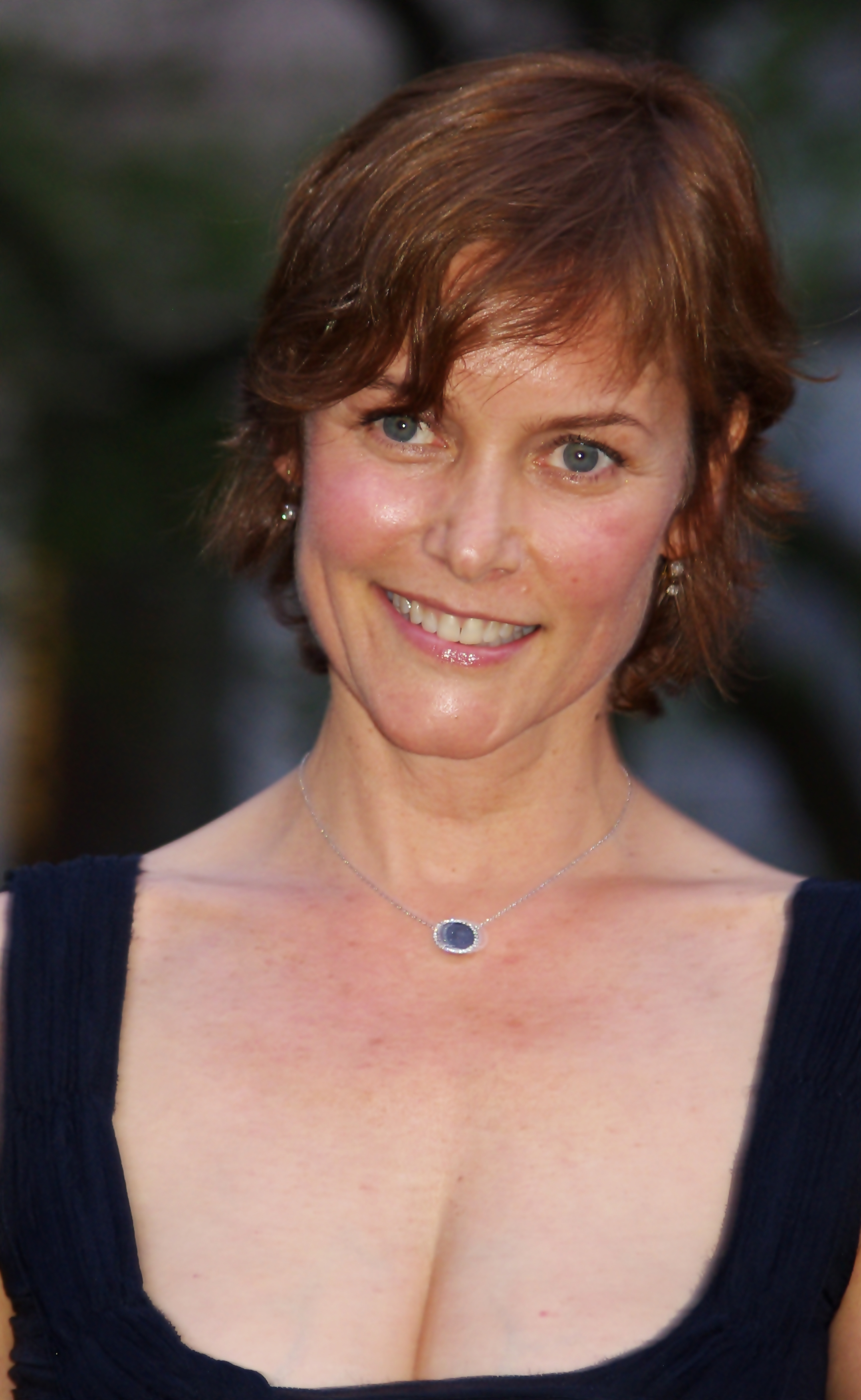
Timothy Dalton (left) in 1987, Carey Lowell (in 2011) and Robert Davi in 2013
- Timothy Dalton as James Bond, an MI6 agent who resigns to take his revenge on drug lord Franz Sanchez.
- Carey Lowell as Pam Bouvier, an ex-Army pilot, and DEA informant.
- Robert Davi as Franz Sanchez, the most powerful drug lord in Latin America, mentioned as having been wanted by the DEA for years.
- Talisa Soto as Lupe Lamora, Sanchez's girlfriend who has romantic feelings for Bond.
- Anthony Zerbe as Milton Krest, Sanchez's henchman who operates Wavekrest Marine Research, and whom Bond sets up to turn Sanchez against him
- Everett McGill as Ed Killifer, a corrupt DEA agent who frees Sanchez from custody.
- Frank McRae as Sharkey, a friend of Felix Leiter who owns a boat charter business.
- Desmond Llewelyn as Q, Bond's ally who supplies Bond with various gadgets and helps him in the field.
- Robert Brown as M, the head of MI6 and Bond's superior who revokes Bond's licence to kill.
- Caroline Bliss as Miss Moneypenny, M's personal secretary.
- Anthony Starke as William Truman-Lodge, Sanchez's financial advisor.
- Grand L. Bush as Hawkins, a DEA operative who opposes Bond's vendetta.
- Benicio del Toro as Dario, Sanchez's personal henchman.
- Alejandro Bracho as Perez, one of Sanchez's henchmen.
- Guy De Saint Cyr as Braun, one of Sanchez's henchmen.
- Diana Lee-Hsu as Loti, a female Hong Kong narcotics agent working with Kwang.
- Rafer Johnson as Mullens, a DEA operative.
- David Hedison as Felix Leiter, a former CIA agent now with DEA and a close friend of James Bond.
- Don Stroud as Colonel Heller, Sanchez's head of security.
- Priscilla Barnes as Della Churchill, Felix Leiter's wife.
- Cary-Hiroyuki Tagawa as Kwang, a Hong Kong Police narcotics agent sent to infiltrate Sanchez's heart of operations.
- Pedro Armendariz as President Hector Lopez, the president of Isthmus.
- Wayne Newton as Professor Joe Butcher, Sanchez's middleman and TV evangelist for Olimpatec Meditation Institute.
- Christopher Neame as Fallon, an MI6 agent sent by M to arrest Bond, dead or alive
- Roger Cudney as Wavekrest Captain
- Jeannine Bisignano as Stripper, working in the Barrelhead bar.
- Claudio Brook as Montelongo, the manager of the Banco de Isthmus and legitimate front for Sanchez.

== Production ==
Shortly after The Living Daylights was released, producer Albert R. Broccoli and writers Michael G. Wilson and Richard Maibaum started discussing the sequel. The film would retain a realistic style, as well as showing the "darker edge" of the Bond character. For the primary location, the producers wanted a place where the series had not yet visited. China was visited after an invitation by the government, but the idea fell through partly because the 1987 film The Last Emperor had removed some of the novelty of filming in China. By this stage the writers had already talked about a chase sequence along the Great Wall, as well as a fight scene amongst the Terracotta Army. Wilson also wrote two plot outlines about a drug lord in the Golden Triangle before the plans fell through because of Broccoli's concerns that the Chinese government would censor the script. The writers eventually decided on a setting in a tropical country while Broccoli negotiated to film in Mexico, at the Estudios Churubusco in Mexico City. In 1985, the Films Act was passed, removing the Eady Levy, resulting in foreign artists being taxed more heavily. The associated rising costs to Eon Productions meant no part of Licence to Kill was filmed in the UK, the first Bond film not to do so. Pinewood Studios, used in every previous Bond film, undertook only the post-production and sound re-recording.

=== Writing and themes ===
The initial outline of what would become Licence to Kill was drawn up by Wilson and Maibaum. Before the pair could develop the script, the Writers Guild of America (WGA) went on strike and Maibaum was unable to continue writing, leaving Wilson to work on the script on his own. Although neither the main plot nor the title of Licence to Kill owe anything to any of the Fleming novels, there are elements from the books that are used in the storyline, including a number of aspects of the short story "The Hildebrand Rarity", such as the character Milton Krest. Felix Leiter's mauling by a shark was based on the novel Live and Let Die, whilst the film version of the book provided the close similarity between the main villain, Mr. Big, and Licence to Kill's main villain Sanchez. The screenplay was not ready by the time casting had begun, with Carey Lowell being auditioned with lines from A View to a Kill.

The script—initially called Licence Revoked—was written with Dalton's characterisation of Bond in mind. The darker story and portrayal of Bond led to the violence being increased and becoming more graphic. Wilson compared the script to Akira Kurosawa's Yojimbo, where a samurai "without any attacking of the villain or its cohorts, only sowing the seeds of distrust, he manages to have the villain bring himself down". Wilson freely admitted that the idea of the destruction-from-within aspect of the plot came more from Yojimbo and Sergio Leone's remake of that film, A Fistful of Dollars, than from Fleming's use of that plot device from The Man with the Golden Gun.

For the location Wilson created the Republic of Isthmus, a banana republic based on Panama, with the pock-marked Sanchez bearing similarities to General Manuel Noriega. The parallels between the two figures were based on Noriega's political use of drug trafficking and money laundering to provide revenues for Panama. Robert Davi suggested the line "loyalty is more important than money", which he felt was fitting to the character of Franz Sanchez, whose actions were noticed by Davi to be concerned with betrayal and retaliation.

The United Artists press kits referred to the film's background as being "Torn straight from the headlines of today's newspapers" and the backdrop of Panama was connected to "the Medellín Cartel in Colombia and corruption of government officials in Mexico thrown in for good measure." This use of the cocaine-smuggling backdrop put Licence to Kill alongside other cinema blockbusters, such as the 1987 films Lethal Weapon, Beverly Hills Cop II and RoboCop, and Bond was seen to be "poaching on their turf" with the drug-related revenge story.

=== Casting ===
After Carey Lowell was chosen to play Pam Bouvier, she watched many of the films in the series for inspiration. Lowell had described becoming a Bond girl as "huge shoes to fill", as she did not see herself as a "glamour girl", even coming to audition in jeans and a leather jacket. While Lowell wore a wig for the scenes set in the United States, a scene where Bouvier is given money and told by Bond to go and buy some new clothes (and, going off and doing so, also has her hair cut) was added so that Lowell's own short hair style could be used.

Robert Davi was cast following a suggestion by Broccoli's daughter Tina, and screenwriter Richard Maibaum, who had seen Davi in the television film Terrorist on Trial: The United States vs. Salim Ajami. To portray Sanchez, Davi researched the Colombian drug cartels and how to do a Colombian accent, and since he was method acting, he would stay in character off-set. After Davi read Casino Royale for preparation, he decided to turn Sanchez into a "mirror image" of James Bond, based on Ian Fleming's descriptions of Le Chiffre. The actor also learned scuba diving for the scene where Sanchez is rescued from the sunken armoured car.

Davi later helped with the casting of Sanchez's mistress Lupe Lamora, by playing Bond in the audition. Talisa Soto was picked from twelve candidates because Davi said he "would kill for her". David Hedison returned to play Felix Leiter, sixteen years after playing the character in Live and Let Die. Hedison did not expect to return to the role, saying "I was sure that [Live and Let Die] would be my first – and last" and Glen was reluctant to cast the 61-year-old actor, since the role included a scene parachuting.

Up-and-coming actor Benicio del Toro was chosen to play Sanchez's henchman, Dario, for being "laid back while menacing in a quirky sort of way", according to Glen. Davi warmed to the actor: "Benicio called me his mentor during 'Licence'". Wayne Newton got the role of Professor Joe Butcher after sending a letter to the producers expressing interest in a cameo because he had always wanted to be in a Bond film. The President of Isthmus was played by Pedro Armendáriz Jr., the son of Pedro Armendáriz, who played Ali Kerim Bey in From Russia with Love.

John Rhys-Davies claimed he was asked to reprise his role from the previous film as General Pushkin in a cameo appearance, but declined since he felt the character was not necessary to the plot.

=== Filming ===
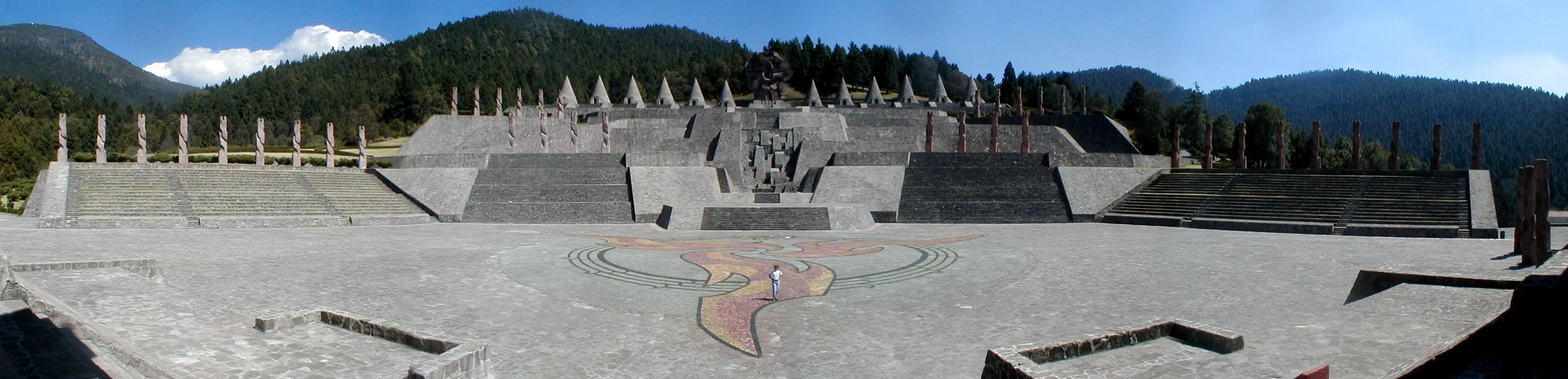
Centro Ceremonial Otomi, designed as a place for the Otomi people to congregate and celebrate their culture, was used to represent the "Olympatec Meditation Institute".

Principal photography ran from 18 July to 18 November 1988. Shooting began in the Estudios Churubusco in Mexico, which mostly doubled for the fictional Republic of Isthmus: locations in Mexico City included the Biblioteca del Banco de Mexico for the exterior of El Presidente Hotel and the Casino Español for the interior of Casino de Isthmus whilst the Teatro de la Ciudad was used for its exterior. Villa Arabesque in Acapulco was used for Sanchez's lavish villa, and the La Rumorosa Mountain Pass in Tecate was used as the filming site for the tanker chase during the climax of the film. Sanchez's Olympiatec Meditation Institute was shot at the Otomi Ceremonial Center in Temoaya. Other underwater sequences were shot at the Isla Mujeres near Cancún.

In August 1988, production moved to the Florida Keys, notably Key West. Seven Mile Bridge towards Pigeon Key was used for the sequence in which the armoured truck transporting Sanchez, following his arrest, is driven off the edge. Other locations there included Ernest Hemingway House, Key West International Airport, Mallory Square, St. Mary's Star of the Sea Church for Leiter's wedding and Stephano's House 707 South Street for his house and patio. The U.S. Coast Guard pier was used to film Isthmus City harbour. As production moved back to Mexico City, Broccoli became ill, marking the first time during the James Bond film series where he was not present during filming.

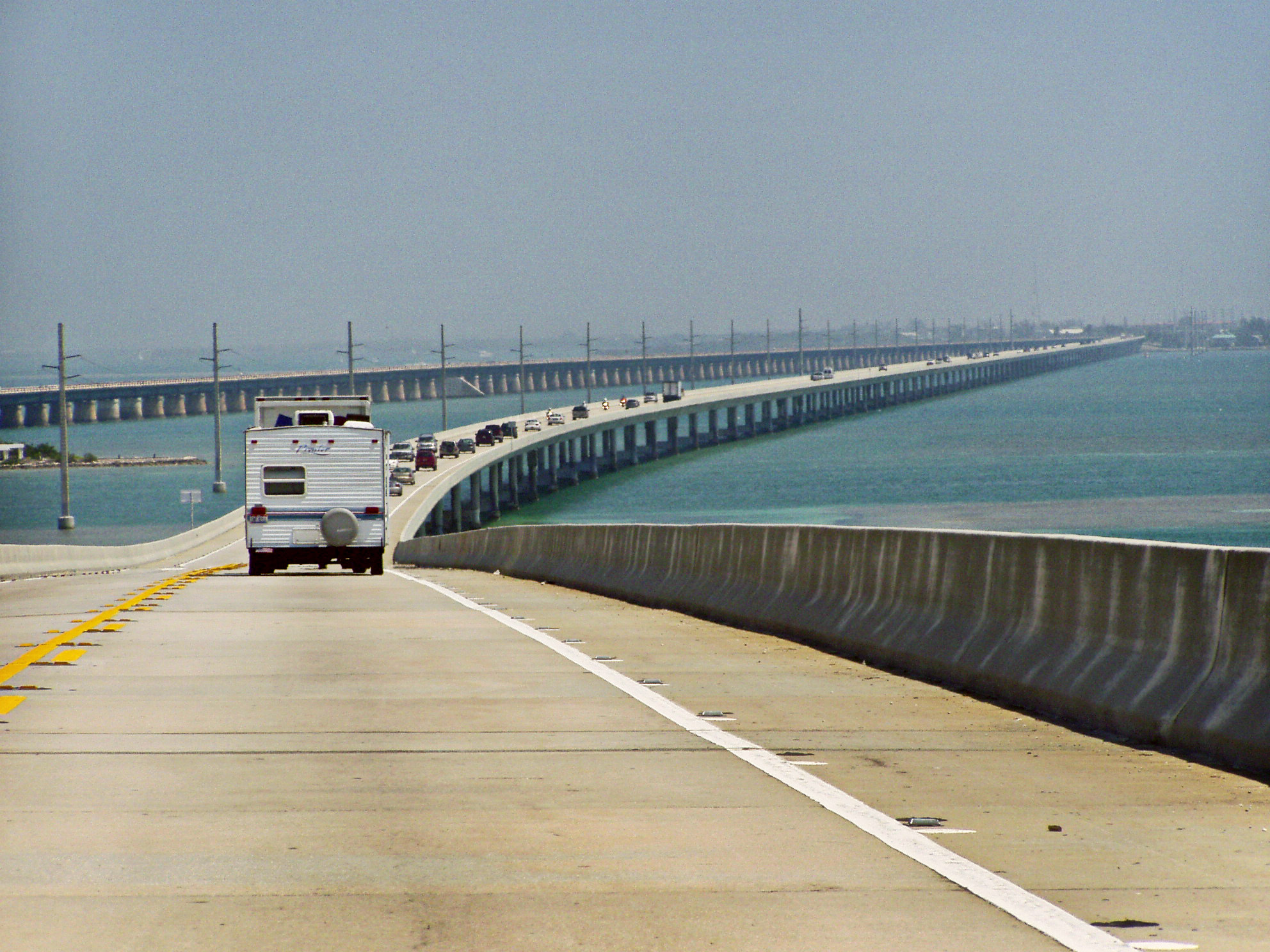
Seven Mile Bridge

The scene where Sanchez's plane is hijacked was filmed on location in Florida, with stuntman Jake Lombard jumping from a helicopter to a plane and Dalton himself tying Sanchez's plane with a cable. The plane towed by the helicopter was a life-sized model created by special effects supervisor John Richardson. After filming wide shots of David Hedison and Dalton parachuting, closer shots were made near the church location. During one of the takes, a malfunction of the harness equipment caused Hedison to fall on the pavement. The injury made him limp for the remainder of filming. The aquatic battle between Bond and the henchmen required two separate units, a surface one led by Arthur Wooster which used Dalton himself, and an underwater one which involved experienced divers. The barefoot waterskiing was done by world champion Dave Reinhart, with some close-ups using Dalton on a special rig. Milton Krest's death used a prosthetic head which was created by John Richardson's team based on a mould of Anthony Zerbe's face. The result was so gruesome that it was shortened and toned down to avoid censorship problems.

For the climactic tanker chase, the producers used an entire section of Mexican Federal Highway 2D in La Rumorosa, Baja California, which had been closed for safety reasons. Sixteen eighteen-wheeler tankers were used, some with modifications made by manufacturer Kenworth at the request of driving stunts arranger Rémy Julienne. Most were given improvements to their engines to run faster, while one model had an extra steering wheel on the back of the cabin so a hidden stuntman could drive while Carey Lowell was in the front and another received extra suspension on its back so it could lift its front wheels. Although a rig was constructed to help a rig tilt onto its side, it was not necessary as Julienne was able to pull off the stunt without the aid of camera trickery.

=== Music ===
Initially Vic Flick, who had played lead guitar on Monty Norman's original 007 theme, and Eric Clapton were asked to write and perform the theme song to Licence to Kill and they produced a theme to match Dalton's gritty performance, but the producers turned it down and instead Gladys Knight's song and performance was chosen. The song was based on the "horn line" from "Goldfinger", seen as an homage to the film of the same name, which required royalty payments to the original writers. The song gave Knight her first British top-ten hit since 1977. The end credits feature the Top 10 R&B hit "If You Asked Me To", sung by Patti LaBelle.

John Barry was originally intended to score but was not available at the time due to throat surgery after suffering a rupture of the esophagus in 1988 and it was considered unsafe to fly him from his home in New York to London to complete the score, post-production was extended to allow Barry time to recover. The soundtrack's score was composed and conducted by Michael Kamen, who was known for scoring many action films at the time, such as Lethal Weapon and Die Hard. Glen said he picked Kamen, feeling he could give "the closest thing to John Barry."

== Release ==
Film ratings organisations had objections to the excessive and realistic violence, with both the Motion Picture Association of America (MPAA) and the British Board of Film Classification requesting content adaptations, with the BBFC in particular demanding the cut of 36 seconds. The 2006 Ultimate Edition DVD of Licence to Kill marked the first release of the film without cuts. It remains the only Bond movie to be originally rated 15 by the BBFC. But for the subsequent cuts, the original examiners had been considering an 18 rating.

Licence to Kill premiered at the Odeon Leicester Square in London on 13 June 1989, raising £200,000 (£529,193 in 2025 pounds) for The Prince's Trust on the night.

There were also issues with the promotion of the film: promotional material in the form of teaser posters created by Bob Peak, based on the Licence Revoked title and commissioned by Albert Broccoli, had been produced, but MGM decided against using them after American test screenings showed 'Licence Revoked' to be a common American phrase for the withdrawal of a driving licence. The delayed, updated advertising by Steven Chorney, in the traditional style, limited the film's pre-release screenings. MGM also discarded a campaign created by advertising executive Don Smolen, who had worked in the publicity campaign for eight previous Bond films, emphasising the rougher content of the film.

== Reception ==
=== Box office ===
At the box office, Licence to Kill grossed $156.2 million ($373.3 million in 2022 dollars) on its budget of $32 million ($78.9 million in 2022 dollars), grossing an inflation-adjusted profit of $287.2 million, making it the twelfth biggest box-office draw of the year. The film grossed a total of £7.5 million (£20 million in {UK} pounds) in the United Kingdom, making it the seventh-most successful film of the year, despite the 15 certificate which cut down audience numbers. In the US and Canada, it grossed $34.6 million, making Licence to Kill the least financially successful James Bond film in the US, when accounting for inflation. A factor suggested for the poor takings was fierce competition at the cinema, with Licence to Kill released alongside Lethal Weapon 2, Ghostbusters II, Indiana Jones and the Last Crusade (starring former Bond Sean Connery), and Batman. Other large international grosses include $14.2 million in Germany, $12.4 million in France, $8.8 million in Japan, $8.7 million in the Netherlands and $8.6 million in Sweden.

Despite grossing more than 4.3 times its budget, Licence to Kill has made the lowest inflation-adjusted box-office return—as well as having the lowest profit margin—out of all 25 of the official Bond films as of 2022.

=== Contemporary reviews ===
Derek Malcolm in The Guardian was broadly approving of Licence to Kill, liking the "harder edge of the earlier Bonds" that the film emulated, but wishing that "it was written and directed with a bit more flair." Malcolm praised the way the film attempted "to tell a story rather than use one for the decorative purposes of endless spectacular tropes." Writing in The Guardian's sister paper, The Observer, Philip French noted that "despite the playful sparkle in his eyes, Timothy Dalton's Bond is ... serious here." Overall French called Licence to Kill "an entertaining, untaxing film". Ian Christie in the Daily Express excoriated the film, saying that the plot was "absurd but fundamentally dull", a further problem being that as "there isn't a coherent storyline to link [the stunts], they eventually become tiresome."

Hilary Mantel in The Spectator dismissed the film:

It is a very noisy film. There is a weary and repetitive note to the frenzy. ... The sex is low key and off-screen but there is a smirking perverse undertow which makes the film more disagreeable than a slasher movie.

David Robinson, writing in The Times, observed that Licence to Kill "will probably neither disappoint nor surprise the great, faithful audience", but bemoaned the fact that "over the years the plots have become less ambitious". Robinson thought that Dalton's Bond "has more class" than the previous Bonds and was "a warmer personality". Iain Johnstone of The Sunday Times pointed out that "any vestiges of the gentleman spy ... by Ian Fleming" have now gone, and in its place is a Bond that is "remarkably close both in deed and action to the eponymous hero of the Batman film" that was released at the same time as Licence to Kill.

Adam Mars-Jones of The Independent gave the film a mixed review, pointing out that it took out some of the more dated ideas from the Fleming novels, such as imperialism; he wrote that the writers were "trying in effect to reproduce the recipe while leaving out ingredients that would now seem distasteful". Overall Mars-Jones thought that:

James Bond is more like a low-tar cigarette than anything else—less stimulating than the throat-curdling gaspers of yesteryear, but still naggingly implicated in unhealthiness, a feeble bad habit without the kick of a vice.

For the Canadian newspaper The Globe and Mail, Rick Groen wrote that in Licence to Kill "they've excised Bond from the Bond flicks; they've turned James into Jimmy, strong and silent and (roll over, Britannia) downright American", resulting in a Bond film that is "essentially Bond-less". Summing up, Groen thought "Actually, that dialogue ... ain't bad. The silence looks good on Timothy Dalton".

Gary Arnold of The Washington Times wrote that a number of factors "fail to prevent the finished product from jamming and misfiring with disillusioning frequency". Arnold opined that "demanding that he [Dalton] play Bond's wrathfulness in a transparently seething and hotheaded manner" means that Dalton "seems to waste away on this second outing as Bond." Overall Arnold sees that there is a "failure to recognize that Bond productions are simply too extravagant to permit an uncompromised return to first principles." The critic for The New York Times, Caryn James, thought Dalton was "the first James Bond with angst, a moody spy for the fin de siecle", and that Licence to Kill "retains its familiar, effective mix of despicably powerful villains, suspiciously tantalizing women and ever-wilder special effects", but was impressed that "Dalton's glowering presence adds a darker tone". James concluded that "for all its clever updatings, stylish action and witty escapism, Licence to Kill ... is still a little too much by the book."

Roger Ebert for the Chicago Sun-Times gave the film 3 1/2 stars out of 4, saying "the stunts all look convincing, and the effect of the closing sequence is exhilarating ... Licence to Kill is one of the best of the recent Bonds." Jack Kroll, writing in Newsweek, described Licence to Kill as "a pure, rousingly entertaining action movie". Kroll was mixed in his appraisal of Dalton, calling him "a fine actor who hasn't yet stamped Bond with his own personality", observing "Director John Glen is the Busby Berkeley of action flicks, and his chorus line is the legendary team of Bond stunt-persons who are at their death-defying best here". For Time magazine, Richard Corliss bemoaned that although the truck stunts were good, it was "a pity nobody – not writers Michael G. Wilson, and Richard Maibaum nor director John Glen – thought to give the humans anything very clever to do." Corliss found Dalton "misused" in the film, adding that "for every plausible reason, he looks as bored in his second Bond film as Sean Connery did in his sixth."

=== Retrospective reviews ===
Opinion on Licence to Kill has changed with the passing of time: some reviews are still mixed, though film review aggregator Rotten Tomatoes lists the film with a positive 79% rating from 63 reviews with the consensus stating that "Licence to Kill is darker than many of the other Bond entries, with Timothy Dalton playing the character with intensity, but it still has some solid chases and fight scenes."

Tom Hibbert of Empire gives the film only two of a possible five stars, observing that "Dalton ... is really quite hopeless". Hibbert concluded that "he may look the part, but Timothy Dalton fails the boots, the scuba gear, or the automobiles left him by Moore and Connery." In 2006, IGN ranked Licence to Kill fifteenth out of the then 21 Bond films, claiming it is "too grim and had strayed too far from the Bond formula." Desmond Llewelyn himself said in his last interview in 1999, the movie "lost all its fantasy...[it] was a very good film, it wasn't a Bond film."

Norman Wilner of MSN considered Licence to Kill the second worst Bond film, above only A View to a Kill, but defended Dalton, saying he "got a raw deal. The actor who could have been the definitive 007 ... had the bad luck to inherit the role just as the series was at its weakest, struggling to cope with its general creative decline and the end of the Cold War". In October 2008, Time Out re-issued a review of Licence to Kill and also thought that Dalton was unfortunate, saying: "one has to feel for Dalton, who was never given a fair shake by either of the films in which he appeared".

Celebrating the 25th anniversary of the film, Esquire's Bob Sassone urged readers to give it a second look. High-Def Digest awarded it four out of five stars when re-released on Blu-ray. British GQ considered it the most underrated in the series, thinking the change in tone caused upset among fans. Digital Spy called Dalton the best Bond of the six actors, praising his depth, terming Licence to Kill a "violently enjoyable 007 detour". Den of Geek writer Max Williams described the finished work as "..about as good as the series can get..", praising Dalton for delivering "his vision of Bond, perfectly.""

Some critics, such as James Berardinelli, saw a fundamental weakness in the film: the "overemphasis on story may be a mistake, because there are times when Licence to Kill's narrative bogs down." Berardinelli gave the film three out of a possible four stars, adding "Licence to Kill may be taut and gripping, but it's not traditional Bond, and that, as much as any other reason, may explain the public's rejection of this reasonably well-constructed picture." Raymond Benson, the author of nine Bond novels, said of the film: "It boggles my mind that Licence to Kill is so controversial. There's really more of a true Ian Fleming story in that script than in most of the post-60s Bond movies." John Glen has said Licence to Kill "is among my best Bond films, if not the best". "I call Timothy Dalton the father of Daniel Craig", Davi admitted years later. "The years of Roger Moore were delicious...But to take Bond into the era when action films were hard and real… Timothy brought that intensity and darkness as an actor...Like Fleming said, Bond’s not necessarily a good guy. Timothy gave Bond that edge.”

== Appearances in other media ==
1989 British Coronet Books paperback edition

The Licence to Kill screenplay was novelised by the then-novelist of the Bond series John Gardner. It was the first Bond film novelisation since James Bond and Moonraker in 1979.

Licence to Kill was also adapted as a forty-four-page, colour graphic novel, by writer and artist Mike Grell (also author of original-story Bond comic books), published by Eclipse Comics and ACME Press in hardcover and trade editions in 1989. The adaptation closely follows the film story, although the ending is briefer, and James Bond is not drawn to resemble Timothy Dalton after Dalton refused to allow his likeness to be licensed. Domark also published a video game adaptation, Licence to Kill, to various personal computers.

The 2012 video game 007 Legends features a level based on Licence to Kill with Carey Lowell reprising her role by providing the voice for the Pam Bouvier character.

== Awards and nominations ==
- 1990 Edgar Allan Poe Award – Best Motion Picture – nomination for Michael G. Wilson and Richard Maibaum
- 1989 MPSE Golden Reel – Outstanding Sound Mixing – nomination for Graham Hartstone

== See also ==
- List of drug films
- Outline of James Bond

== Bibliography ==
- Barnes, Alan; Hearn, Marcus (2001). Kiss Kiss Bang! Bang!: The Unofficial James Bond Film Companion. Batsford Books. ISBN 978-0-7134-8182-2.
- Black, Jeremy (2005). The Politics of James Bond: From Fleming's Novel to the Big Screen. University of Nebraska Press. ISBN 978-0-8032-6240-9. Archived from the original on 8 May 2021.
- Chapman, James (2007). Licence to Thrill: A Cultural History of the James Bond Films. London; New York City: I. B. Tauris. ISBN 978-1-84511-515-9.
- Conroy, Mike (2004). 500 Great Comicbook Action Heroes. London: Chrysalis Books Group. ISBN 978-1-84411-004-9. Archived from the original on 8 May 2021.
- Cork, John; Stutz, Collin (2007). James Bond Encyclopedia. London: Dorling Kindersley. ISBN 978-1-4053-3427-3.
- Lindner, Christoph (2009). The James Bond Phenomenon: A Critical Reader (2nd ed.). Manchester University Press. ISBN 978-0-7190-8095-1. Archived from the original on 31 March 2019.
- Paul, Louis (2007). Tales from the cult film trenches: interviews with 36 actors from horror, science fiction and exploitation cinema. Jefferson, NC: McFarland & Company. ISBN 978-0-7864-2994-3. Archived from the original on 8 May 2021.
- Pfeiffer, Lee; Worrall, Dave (1998). The Essential Bond. London: Boxtree Ltd. ISBN 978-0-7522-2477-0.
- Smith, Jim (2002). Bond Films. London: Virgin Books. ISBN 978-0-7535-0709-4.
- Wickham, Phil; Mettler, Erinna (2005). Back to the Future: The Fall and Rise of the British Film Industry in the 1980s (PDF). London: BFI Information Services. ISBN 1-84457-108-4. Archived (PDF) from the original on 12 September 2015.
