= Kickboxer 2 =

1991 American martial arts film

- Theatrical release poster
- Directed by: Albert Pyun
- Written by: David S. Goyer
- Based on: Characters by Mark DiSalle and Jean-Claude Van Damme
- Produced by: Tom Karnowski
- Starring: Sasha Mitchell; Peter Boyle; Dennis Chan; Cary-Hiroyuki Tagawa; John Diehl; Michel Qissi
- Cinematography: George Mooradian
- Edited by: Alan Baumgarten
- Music by: Anthony Riparetti; James Saad
- Production company: Kings Road Entertainment
- Distributed by: Trimark Pictures (U.S.); Vision International (Non-U.S.)
- Release date: June 13, 1991
- Running time: 89 minutes
- Country: United States
- Language: English
- Box office: $1.2 million (United States)

Kickboxer 2 (stylized on-screen as Kickboxer 2: The Road Back) is a 1991 American martial arts film directed by Albert Pyun and written by David S. Goyer. The film is the second entry into the Kickboxer film series, and stars Sasha Mitchell in the role of David Sloan (unlike Sloane in the first film), the brother of Kickboxer's lead character Kurt, portrayed by Jean-Claude Van Damme.

== Plot ==
One year after the events of the first film, it is revealed that kickboxing brothers Kurt and Eric Sloane died shortly after Kurt's victory over Tong Po. David Sloane, the last surviving brother, struggles to keep the family's Los Angeles kickboxing gym afloat with his business partner, Jack. He offers free kickboxing lessons to local kids, often demonstrating a technique he calls the "rock and the river" which allows him to defend against attacks while blindfolded.

Although his will to compete has waned since the loss of his brothers, financial problems eventually force David to fight again in a new organization run by a crooked promoter, Justin Maciah. His surprising comeback ultimately attracts the attention of Po, who is revealed to have killed Kurt and Eric in revenge for his defeat. With Kurt dead, Po seeks to defeat David in the ring and regain his honor. But when David announces his retirement after a victory against Neil Vargas, Po's manager Sanga (who is later revealed as helping to fund Maciah's kickboxing organization) hires a group of thugs to burn down the gym; Vargas goes with them to enact petty revenge for his defeat. Although David attempts to fight them off, he is beaten down and suffers a gunshot wound to the leg. The injury prevents him from aiding a young student trapped in the blaze, who dies as a result.

While recovering in the hospital, David is visited by Xian Chow, the Muay Thai Kru who trained his brother Kurt in Thailand. Though David initially wants nothing to do with him, he finally relents and allows Xian to nurse him back to health. Meanwhile, one of David's most promising students, Brian Wagner, has secured a championship bout and invites David to watch the fight. However, the champion is unexpectedly replaced by Po, as a part of a deal made between Maciah and Sanga. Tong Po pummels Wagner with illegal blows and kills him in the ring despite David's efforts to intervene. The bout leaves Justin in financial and professional ruin, while Sanga declares their partnership is over. Afterwards, Xian reveals to David that Tong Po had also killed his niece Mylee along with David's brothers. He guiltily admits that part of him wants revenge for her death, and is willing to sacrifice David to get it.

Insisting that the fight is his own, David accepts Po's challenge. In a bloody bout reminiscent of the "ancient way" of fighting in Thailand, (using tape covered in resin and broken glass) David is beaten badly and has clouded vision. Utilizing his "rock and the river" technique, however, David gains the upper hand and ultimately defeats his rival. Having lost his honor, Sanga confronts David in the ring at gunpoint, but thanks to a distraction by his friend Jack, David is able to disarm and incapacitate him.

The next day, David unsuccessfully teaches Xian to drive a car. When his students introduce him to the new neighborhood bully, David once again demonstrates the "rock and the river", but the lesson is cut short when the ice cream truck arrives, and Xian treats the kids.

== Cast ==
- Sasha Mitchell as David Sloane
- Peter Boyle as Justin Maciah
- Dennis Chan as Xian Chow, David's Muay Thai Kru
- Cary-Hiroyuki Tagawa as Sanga
- John Diehl as Jack
- Michel Qissi as Tong "The Tiger" Po
- Heather McComb as Jo
- Vince Murdocco as Brian Wagner
- Vincent Klyn as Thai Thug
- Gene LeBell as The Referee
- Don Familton as Brian's Cornerman
- Matthias Hues as Neil Vargas
- Humberto Ortiz as Joey
- Emmanuel Kervyn as Kurt Sloane
- Casey Stengel as Eric Sloane
- Joe Restivo as The Ring Announcer
- Brian Austin Green as Tommy
- Brent Kelly as Carl
- Amy Arthur as Kristen Wagner
- Annie O'Donnell as Mrs. Wagner
- Robert Gottlieb as Lou Lescano
- Debrae Barensfeld as Maciah's Girlfriend
- Ed Anders as Brian's Opponent

== Release ==
Kickboxer 2 was given a limited release theatrically in the United States by Trimark Pictures in June 1991, grossing $1,250,712 at the box office.

== Home media ==
HBO Home Video released it on VHS and laserdisc the same year. In the Philippines, the film was released by Pioneer Films on July 4, 1991.

The film was released on DVD by Lionsgate in 2003.

== Reception ==
In comparison to the 1989 Van Damme original, the film was not well received. TV Guide opined: "From its opening moments it's obvious that Kickboxer 2 is struggling under the leaden weight of humorlessness. This is the movie that absolutely no one wanted to see: a kickboxing movie that takes itself dead serious".

On Rotten Tomatoes it has an approval rating of 20% based on reviews from 5 critics.
