= Sasha Mitchell =

American actor (born 1967)

- Born: Sasha Sergei Mitchell; July 27, 1967 (age 59); Los Angeles, California, U.S.
- Occupations: Actor, martial artist
- Years active: 1986–2019
- Spouses: Jeanette Robbins (m. 1990; div. 1997) Rachel Mitchell (m. 2010; div. 2015)
- Children: 4

Sasha Sergei Mitchell (born July 27, 1967) is an American martial artist and former actor best known for his television roles as Cody Lambert on Step by Step and James Beaumont on Dallas. He also played the role of David Sloan in three of the five installments of the original Kickboxer film franchise. Mitchell has a black belt in taekwondo.

== Early life ==
Mitchell was born on July 27, 1967, in Los Angeles, California, the son of a garment manufacturer. He is of Ukrainian Jewish descent. His ancestors came to the United States from Kyiv, Ukraine. His real family name is Muchnik.

== Career ==
Prior to acting, Mitchell was often used as a model for Bruce Weber's fashion photography.

From 1989 to 1991, Mitchell appeared on the hit CBS prime time soap opera Dallas, as James Beaumont, the illegitimate first-born son of J. R. Ewing and his long-ago girlfriend Vanessa Beaumont. He made guest appearances on other series, including Rags to Riches.

He had the title role in the 1988 film Spike of Bensonhurst and in 1994's Class of 1999 II: The Substitute. He starred in Kickboxer 2: The Road Back and the third and fourth installments of the film series. He also appeared in a 3 Musketeers commercial in 1989.

His best-known role came on the ABC sitcom Step by Step, where he played Cody Lambert, the nephew of actor Patrick Duffy's character Frank Lambert. Duffy had also played the uncle of Mitchell's character on Dallas. Mitchell's character Cody was based on his personal life experiences.

In the early 2000s, Mitchell acted in several films and made guest appearances on JAG, NYPD Blue, and ER.

== Personal life ==
In 1990, he married Jeannette Robbins. The two had four children together before divorcing in 1997.

During Mitchell's marriage to Robbins, police were called to the couple's home to investigate reports of domestic abuse. In 1996, Mitchell was convicted of misdemeanor battery, spousal abuse and child endangerment stemming from an altercation with his wife. He was given three years’ probation and ordered to perform community service and attend counseling classes for spousal abusers. After violating his probation, he was sentenced to 30 days in jail.

In December 2010, Mitchell married his second wife Rachel, also known as Sharmaine Rayner. He filed for divorce in spring 2015.

== Filmography ==
Year	Title	Role	Notes
1987	Death Before Dishonor	Ruggieri	
1988	Spike of Bensonhurst	Spike Fumo	
1991	Kickboxer 2	David Sloan	Also known as Kickboxer 2: The Road Back
1992	Kickboxer 3	David Sloan	Also known as Kickboxer III: The Art of War; Direct-to-video
1994	Kickboxer 4	David Sloan	Also known as Kickboxer 4: The Aggressor; Direct-to-video
1994	Class of 1999 II: The Substitute	John Bolen	Direct-to-video
2000	Luck of the Draw	Buddy	
2001	Gangland	Derek	
2003	The Failures	Reflexor	
2003	Dickie Roberts: Former Child Star	Angry Driver	
2004	Slammed	"Slammer"	
2010	Abelar: Tales of an Ancient Empire	Rodrigo	
2012	Tales of an Ancient Empire: Behind the Scenes	Himself	Documentary
2015	EP/Executive Protection	Issac	
2016	I Love You Both	Ted	
2016	Smoke Filled Lungs	Peter	
2016	Assassin X	"Blade"	
2018	Father and Father	"Big Baldy"	Short film
2019	Drunk Parents	Shope	
—	~~Anadellia Rises~~		Completed 2019, unreleased

=== Television ===
Year	Title	Role	Notes
1986	Pleasures	Antonio	TV movie
1986	St. Elsewhere	"Southie"	Season 5 episode 4: "Brand New Bag"
1987	Rags to Riches	The Duke	2 episodes Archival footage - 1 episode
1987	Not Quite Human	Bryan Skelly	TV movie
1989	William Tell	Gessler's Brother / Boy	Also known as Crossbow in the United Kingdom and The Adventures of William Tell; 2 episodes
1989	The Flamingo Kid	Jeffery Willis	TV short
1989	Parent Trap: Hawaiian Honeymoon	Jack	TV movie
1989–1991	Dallas	James Beaumont	45 episodes Credit only - 5 episodes
1991–1998	Step by Step	Cody Lambert	118 episodes
1992-1994	ABC TGIF	Cody Lambert	3 episodes
1993	Circus of the Stars Gives Kids the World	Himself	TV documentary
1994	ABC Sneak Peek with Step by Step	Cody Lambert	TV movie
1998	Love Boat: The Next Wave	Ron	Season 1 episode 5: "True Course"
2000	This Is How the World Ends	Cop	TV movie
2002	JAG	Commander Curry	Season 7 episode 19: "First Casualty"
2003	L.A. Confidential		TV movie
2004–2005	ER	The Bartender / Patrick	4 episodes
2005	NYPD Blue	Darian Lasalle	Season 12 episode 13: "Stoli with a Twist"
2015	Frontlines	Captain Samuels	TV short
