= Fair Media Council =

Fair Media Council advocates for quality news and works to create a media-savvy society in a media-driven world. It uses the taglines, "Get Media Savvy." and "Smart. Savvy. Connected." in its programming and branding.

A 501(c)(3) nonprofit organization, the Fair Media Council's two-sided mission makes it unlike any organization in the country. The organization is under the direction of chief executive officer and executive director Jaci Clement, who was recruited to design a strategic vision for the organization in a rapidly changing media landscape. FMC has a board of directors composed of New York business and community leaders, an advisory board of accomplished businesspeople and journalists, and a wide range of businesses and nonprofit organizations as members.

FMC places a major emphasis on educating the public to become media savvy news consumers. Educational programming is held throughout the year, as well as opportunities for the public to meet with the media and engage in an open dialogue that focuses on demystifying the news process for the news consumer. A weekly newsletter, The Latest, offers exclusive media commentary and written by Clement, as well as the notable "Watch List," a look at happenings inside media, and FMC member and event information analysis.

FMC works directly with the media on issues as they arise in news coverage, ranging from story coverage to business decisions that place limitations on coverage and how that impacts the news consumer as well as creates information voids in the marketplace. It is anti-consolidation in philosophy, wanting as many independent media voices and reporters working within a market as possible to ensure the public is provided with a variety of news, sources and opinions. It also works to keep the media responsible and responsive to the community it serves.

FMC had created a news literacy program for children and, to encourage teachers to incorporate news literacy into their classes, created a teacher recognition program for 4th-to-6th grade teachers across the country. FMC also created a Media Savvy Bill of Rights.

== History ==
FMC was formerly known as the Long Island Coalition for Fair Broadcasting, Inc., the Long Island-based media watchdog that monitored the work of the over-the-air television stations in New York City for Long Island coverage. In 2004, noting the changed media landscape and the evolving distribution methods for news to reach the public, the organization expanded its mission and focus and its name was changed to Fair Media Council to reflect its new purpose.

== Signature Events ==
To address issues arising from the rapidly-fragmenting media landscape and fake news, the Fair Media Council revised its annual conference, Connection Day, and introduced "The News Conference: Real & Powerful" on Dec. 5, 2017. Billed as "bringing out the best in local and national news," The News Conference provides the public with the opportunity to "go behind the headlines and beyond soundbites" to create a media-savvy consumer which, according to Clement, enables them to become their own watchdogs of the news.

Each year, the Fair Media Council hosts its largest event, The Fair Media Council Folio Awards which it describes as Long Island's biggest media event.

FMC events continuously attract influential people in the news business. Most recently, featured speakers at FMC events have included Dan Rather, Bill Keller, Maggie Haberman, Michael Wolff, Al Roker, Donny Deutsch, Rita Cosby, Neal Shapiro, Harry Siegel, Walt Handelsman, Helen Thomas, William F. Baker and Bob Woodruff.
