= Redemption: Kickboxer 5 =

1995 American martial arts film

- Official DVD cover
- Directed by: Kristine Peterson
- Written by: Rick Filon
- Produced by: Michael S. Murphey
- Starring: Mark Dacascos; James Ryan
- Cinematography: Paul Michelson
- Edited by: Kert Vandermeulen
- Music by: John Massari
- Production company: Kings Road Entertainment
- Distributed by: Vidmark Entertainment
- Release date: August 1995
- Running time: 87 minutes
- Country: United States
- Language: English

Redemption: Kickboxer 5 (stylized on-screen as The Redemption) is a 1995 American direct-to-video martial arts film starring Mark Dacascos and directed by Kristine Peterson. The film is the fifth entry in the Kickboxer film series and the first to have a plot that does not revolve around a member of the Sloane family. It instead revolves around a character named Matt Reeves, said in dialogue to be a friend of the Sloane family.

== Plot ==
Negaal is a South African former kickboxer turned promoter who is gearing up to start his own kickboxing organization. When American champion David Sloane refuses to join, Negaal sends his Henchmen Moon, Bull, and Pinto in Los Angeles California to eliminate David. David manages to break Moon's leg but is ultimately killed by Bull and Pinto.

Matt Reeves is a former kickboxer turned martial arts teacher. As a friend of David's, he is shocked to learn of his death. That night, his one-time student Johnny Styles is competing for the now vacant United States Championship. When Johnny wins the title, he is approached by Moon, Bull, and Pinto to join the Negaal Kickboxing Federation. Johnny decides to meet with the trio, but Matt is suspicious. When his friend Charlie informs him that the three men also talked to David just two days before he was found murdered, Matt races to find Johnny. Johnny refuses the offer from Negaal and is forced to fight Bull and Pinto, who overwhelm him and break his back. Matt arrives to fend them off, and takes Johnny to the hospital.

When Negaal gets word of what has happened, he wants Matt dead. Bollen, Negaal's right-hand man, recruits Paul Croft, a former member of Negaal's organization who is freed from prison on the condition he kills Matt. That night, Matt is confronted by Paul, who, instead of killing him, warns him about Negaal. Matt decides to head to Johannesburg, South Africa to find Negaal. Paul finds out Matt is on the plane, and the two end up sitting next to each other. When they arrive at the airport, Moon is awaiting Paul, who hides Matt in an attempt to prove he did his job. However, Paul attempts to escape and is confronted by Negaal's thugs until Matt arrives to help. Shocked by the turn of events, Moon escapes as do the thugs. Matt and Paul part ways, and when Matt finds an address, he goes there to find a regular shop. When he asks the shopkeeper about Negaal, Bollen just happens to be there, and both he and his men attempt to go after Matt. Returning the favor from the airport incident, Paul arrives to help Matt. It is also revealed that it was Bollen who sent Paul to prison in the first place, and Paul wants revenge. The duo fight off the thugs, but then find themselves arrested for causing trouble at the shop when Bollen forces the shopkeeper to rat on them.

Meanwhile, Negaal has been presenting champions from all over the world with an ultimatum: join his federation or die. Fearing for his life, the French Champion reluctantly joins. After the two incidents involving Matt and Paul, Negaal confronts Moon, Bull, and Bollen and proceeds to shoot Bull in the head with a hunting rifle. When the German Champion refuses to join the federation, he challenges Negaal to a fight on the lawn. Negaal kills the German Champion with the "Tiger Claw", (an illegal strike that he had used on a Dutch Fighter years ago when he was a kickboxer, resulting in him getting a lifetime ban from the sport.)

With the help of fellow prisoner Joseph Mabuza, Matt and Paul escape when one of the guards was revealed to be one of Negaal's men. The trio make their escape and separate, with Matt and Paul catching up to Angie, who is revealed to be Paul's younger sister. She is wondering what is going on and is unhappy when it is revealed that Negaal is the reason. While Paul served his prison sentence, the patriarch of the Croft family had died. Matt and Paul convince Angie that they must stop Negaal once and for all if they are to ever be happy again. Both men begin to train with Matt discovering a way to counter Negaal's Tiger Claw when he breaks an arrow using his neck muscles to show that a fatal blow can, in fact, be countered. As they learn Negaal is planning a major party, they decide to crash it along with Angie, who defies Matt and Paul and goes undercover as well.

When Paul finally confronts Bollen in the backyard, Matt sees Negaal at the roulette table and begins to win, angering Negaal. When Negaal learns that the man who is winning is the one he's been after this whole time, Matt finally exposes Negaal to everyone for who he really is. The goons arrive, and Matt defeats them all and finally is ready to take on Negaal. As the two begin their fight, they go from Negaal's office to the lawn. When Negaal attempts the Tiger Claw to Matt's neck, Matt uses his counter technique and unleashes a Tiger Claw of his own, hitting Negaal right in the heart. Negaal falls, and Matt proceeds back to the office, where he grabs the United States Championship belt. Negaal returns to take the belt back. Matt's Tiger Claw finally takes its effect, and Negaal finally dies. Matt retrieves the belt as he, Paul, and Angie walk off as police sirens are heard.

== Cast ==
- Mark Dacascos as Matt Reeves
- James Ryan as Mr. Negaal
- Geoff Meed as Paul Croft
- Rulan Booth as Angie Croft
- Greg Latter as Bollen
- Duane Porter as "Bull"
- George Moolman as Pinto
- Denney Pierce as Johnny Styles
- Robert Whitehead as Tito
- Gavin Hood as German Champion
- Patrick Emerson as French Champion
- Burton Richardson as Jack
- John Hussey as "Chalky"
- Dale Cutts as Gus
- John Matshikiza as Police Detective
- Eric Miyeni as Joseph Mabuza
- Thomas Witt as Prison Trustee
- Isaac Mavimbela as Busi
- Vrenika Pather as Neegal's Date
- Vernon Herbert as Johnny's Opponent
- Mike Larenjiera as Johnny's Cornerman
- June Castro as Casino Dealer
- Frank Notaro as Maxwell (uncredited)
- Jonathan Vorster Mark's class
