= Antoni Koper =

Polish resistance fighter and journalist (1906–1990)

Antoni Stephan Koper
- Born: September 6, 1906; Warsaw, Poland
- Died: June 13, 1990 (aged 83); Arlington, Virginia, US
- Spouse: Sophie Margulies Koper
- Relatives: Peter Koper (son)
- Military career
- Allegiance: Second Polish Republic; Polish government-in-exile
- Branch: Polish Land Forces; 1st Armoured Division (Poland)
- Service years: 1939–1947
- Rank: Lieutenant
- Conflicts: Invasion of Poland; Warsaw Uprising
- Awards: Yad Vashem Award
- Memorials: Garden of the Righteous Among the Nations
- Other work: Defense Language Institute; United States Information Agency; Voice of America

Antoni Stefan Koper (September 6, 1906 – June 13, 1990) was active in the Polish resistance movement during World War II. He helped rescue Jews from the Warsaw Ghetto and fought in the Warsaw Uprising. After escaping from a Nazi prison camp, he first fled to London, and then emigrated to the United States. There, he worked for the Defense Language Institute, United States Information Agency, and the Voice of America. He died of cancer in 1990.

== Early life and the Invasion of Poland ==
Antoni Koper was born in Warsaw, Poland in 1906, and was graduated from the University of Warsaw. He had chosen a career in journalism, but the September 1939 Invasion of Poland by Germany found him on the front, fighting with the Polish Army. After Germany annexed Poland weeks later, Koper returned home to occupied Warsaw. Because he was not permitted to work as a journalist under the occupation government, a friend hired him at the municipal tax bureau, where he was tasked with collecting city taxes due from Jews now residing in the ghetto. The tax bureau provided Koper with an Ausweis, an identity card allowing him to move freely about Warsaw, including Warsaw's Jewish ghetto, without fear of being caught in a Nazi roundup and possibly transported to a labor camp.

== Occupation of Warsaw ==
During the occupation of Warsaw, Koper and a friend spent their nights publishing underground newspapers and forging travel and identification documents on a secret printing press. During the day, instead of collecting taxes, Koper would use his Ausweis to visit Jewish friends in the ghetto, to whom he smuggled such luxuries as soap and Portuguese sardines, as well as the forged papers needed to escape to the Aryan side of the city.

Among the friends he visited in the ghetto was Sophie Fanny Margulies, whom he had first met in 1935 while she was also studying journalism at the University of Warsaw. She had been relocated to the ghetto in October 1940, but she also held an Ausweiss, provided to her from a friend on the Jewish Council, and thus had avoided transport to the camps. The rest of her family was less fortunate, and had been transported to their deaths at Treblinka during the Grossaktion Warsaw.

Marguiles recalled how Koper visited her in October 1942, to inform her that his Ausweiss was about to expire; if she wanted to escape, they must start planning now. Margulies was ready, having twice been nearly caught up in roundups in spite of her papers. On a snowy night in early February 1943, Marguiles followed Koper's instructions, finding her way at the prescribed time to a specified place along the ghetto wall where a secret opening was revealed to her, allowing her to pass through the wall to a waiting horse-drawn carriage which took her to Koper's apartment.

Koper and his mother Marta cared for an apartment building located at 6 Ratuszowa Street, in the right bank suburb of Praga, and lived in apartment 13. In addition to Sophie Marguiles, Koper also hid Bronislawa and Henryk Finkelstein, Dr. Maximilian Ciesieleski, MIeczyslaw Goldstein and Marek Stok. They were among thirteen ghetto refugees who hid in Koper's apartment for various periods of time between 1942 and 1944, including unaccompanied children who were eventually relocated to Catholic orphanages. Marguiles took an alias, and spent the months preceding the Warsaw Uprising helping Koper deliver the underground newspaper he was publishing.

Koper was also part of the intelligence operation that warned the Allies about the German invasion of the Soviet Union.

Koper persisted in his dangerous resistance and humanitarian efforts, undaunted by extraordinary personal risk, and then, as a member of the Polish resistance, fought the Germans in the Warsaw Uprising in August 1944. In the resistance, he had the nom-de-guerre "Nienaski". When Warsaw fell, the Germans took Koper prisoner. A few months later, he escaped a Nazi prison camp and crossed the front to join the Polish Army. He published newspapers and worked in counter-intelligence until the end of the war.

== After the war ==
Once hostilities ended, Koper married Sophie Margulies, who had also fought in the Warsaw Uprising as a nurse, treating Polish Home Army casualties during the battle. They relocated to Quakenbrück, Germany, then occupied by the First Armoured Polish Division, where Koper wrote news articles for Polish Soldiers Daily. There, in 1947, Sophie gave birth to their son, Peter.

Before emigrating to the United States, the Koper family spent a brief time in London, where Koper earned a doctorate in journalism from the Polish University of London.

In 1952, Koper moved his family to the United States to take a position as a professor at the Defense Language Institute in Monterey, California. In 1958, they relocated to Washington, DC, where Koper worked at the United States Information Agency (USIA) until he retired in 1979. At USIA, Koper edited Ameryka, the Polish language version of the Cold War era "soft propaganda" magazine, Amerika.

Koper was president of the Polish Veterans Association in Washington D.C. in December 1981, when martial law was declared in Poland. "We're sitting helplessly on the sidelines. There is no communication, the post office doesn't work, the telephone doesn't work, traveling is impossible. It's unbelievable that in this time and age, the country can be padlocked completely," Koper told a reporter. Before martial law ended, Koper was called out of retirement to work as an editor for Voice of America.

In 1989, fifty years after the Invasion of Poland, Koper and his wife returned to Poland on what he called a "sentimental journey," to see how Poland, and the people had changed, and to visit with the few survivors. He recalled the beauty of Warsaw before the invasion, and the unbelievable destruction wrought by the Germans. He told USA Today, "You can't really go home again, but for a visit you can try." Of their visit to Poland, Sophie Koper later remembered, "I did not find my Warsaw."

In June, 1990, the Israeli Government awarded Koper the Yad Vashem award in recognition of his valor. A week later, on June 13, 1990, Koper died of cancer in Arlington, Virginia. He was survived by his wife and son.

A month later, the Israeli diplomatic delegation to the United States honored Koper posthumously at a ceremony attended by his family in Washington, D.C. His name appears on the Walls of Honor in Yad Vashem's Garden of the Righteous Among the Nations.

Koper's history of the Polish underground press in Germany was published posthumously in 1993.
