= Jaci Clement =

American media scholar, nonprofit executive, and podcast host

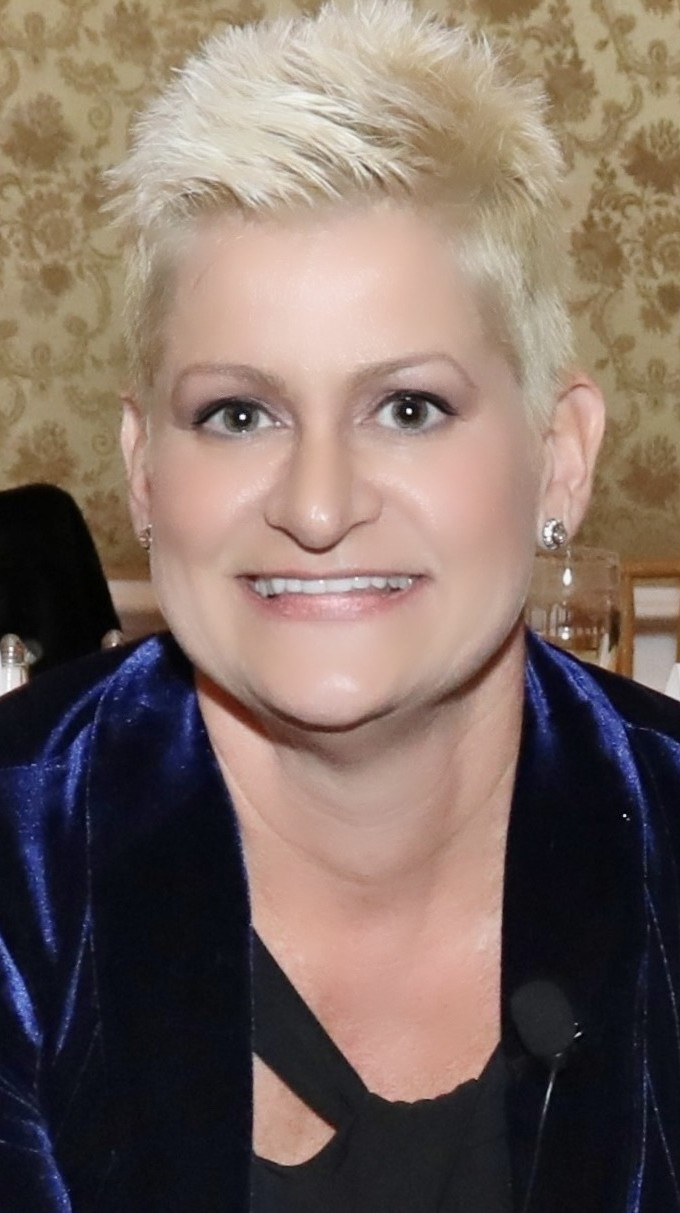
- Jaci Clement in 2019
- Born: Youngstown, Ohio
- Education: Hofstra University
- Occupations: Media executive Podcast host
- Organization: Fair Media Council

Jaci Clement is an American media scholar, nonprofit executive, writer, public speaker, and podcast host. She is chief executive officer and executive director of the Fair Media Council.

== Career ==
Following executive roles at the Times Mirror Company and Dolan Media in Minneapolis, where she worked in both the editorial and business sides of the newspaper industry, Clement led the Long Island Coalition for Fair Broadcasting in 2001. In 2004, she broadened the organization’s mission beyond broadcast oversight to print, digital, and emerging platforms. At that time, the organization adopted a new name, becoming the Fair Media Council.

Clement is also the host of a podcast that features discussions on media, technology, and culture. She monitors changes in the media landscape and their impact.

== Early life and education ==
Clement was born in Youngstown, Ohio. She first wrote for a newspaper in the fourth grade for The Youngstown Vindicator, the local daily newspaper. While attending Hofstra University, she served as editor-in-chief of the student newspaper, The Chronicle, and authored an investigative article that led to the resignation of a tenured professor. She also contributed to the Education section of The New York Times and wrote for local publications on Long Island. She holds a Bachelor of Arts in communication arts from Hofstra University.

== Teaching and advisory roles ==
Clement taught journalism at Hofstra University. She has served in an advisory capacity with Media Ethics Magazine published by the University of Illinois at Urbana-Champaign, and was a board member for Bethpage Federal Credit Union.

== Awards and recognition ==
Clement holds the Executive Communicator designation from the Association for Women in Communications. She received the Media Advocate of the Year Award from the Long Island Association and a Distinguished Service Award from the Advancement for Commerce, Industry and Technology (ACIT). She has also been named one of the "Most Powerful Long Islanders" by Long Island Business News.

== Professional affiliations ==
She has held memberships in the National Press Club and London-based The Media Society.
