= The Martial Arts Kid =

- Directed by: Michael Baumgarten
- Written by: Michael Baumgarten; Adam W. Marsh
- Produced by: James E. Wilson; Cheryl Wheeler-Dixon
- Starring: Don "The Dragon" Wilson; Cynthia Rothrock; Jansen Panettiere; Matthew Ziff; Kathryn Newton; T. J. Storm
- Cinematography: Robert Hayes
- Edited by: Phil Norden
- Music by: Kazimir Boyle
- Production company: Traditionz Entertainment
- Release date: September 18, 2015
- Running time: 102 minutes
- Country: United States

The Martial Arts Kid is a 2015 martial arts film directed by Michael Baumgarten and starring Don "The Dragon" Wilson and Cynthia Rothrock as a couple who take in their nephew Jansen Panettiere, and teach him martial arts when he is bullied. Most of the supporting cast of the film are actual martial artists, some of whom appear as themselves in the film.

== Plot ==
Robbie Oakes is a Cleveland high schooler who, after losing his mother, finds himself constantly in trouble with the law. When his grandmother has had enough, Robbie is sent to Cocoa Beach, Florida to live with his aunt Cindy and uncle Glen. The night of his arrival, Robbie sneaks out of the house and goes to a convenience store. There, he sees a young girl, Rina, sitting in a car. When he talks to her, Rina's boyfriend Bo harasses and punches Robbie in the face.

The next day at school, Robbie finds himself again harassed and embarrassed by Bo, who pushes him into the girls' restroom. At lunch, Robbie meets his first friend, Lenny, who suggests that Robbie learn self-defense. When Cindy invites him to lunch at a restaurant, they are confronted by a thug. When Robbie confronts the thug verbally, the thug pulls out a knife. Cindy takes on the thug and uses martial arts to stop him. The police arrive, and Robbie asks Cindy where she learned martial arts.

The following day, Robbie goes to the Space Coast Dojo, which is run by Glen. Glen takes Robbie as a student. When Glen takes Robbie to a local bike shop, Glen takes on a bully harassing the bike shop owner, who turns out to be Rina's father.

On his first bike ride, Robbie finds another local school, Dojo Extreme. There, he meets Coach Laurent Kaine, who unlike Glen believes that martial arts are for winning and destroying opponents. Robbie also learns that Bo is a student of Kaine's and leaves. Robbie becomes more friendly and begins to respect Glen and Cindy as if they were his real parents. He also gets a job at the bike shop under the condition that he can attempt to steal Rina away from Bo. When Bo finds Robbie one day, he starts his verbal attack on Robbie but this time, Robbie doesn't budge. Glen, worried something dangerous happens, goes to Dojo Extreme to talk to Kaine. Kaine and Glen used to be friends, but their opposing views of martial arts have made them rivals. When Kaine learns that Bo has been bullying Robbie, he tells Glen there's not much he can do because Bo's father has a lot of pull in town.

At a Halloween party, Robbie admits his feelings for Rina, who has been stood up by Bo. The next day at the Space Coast Dojo, Rina reciprocates her feelings towards Robbie and the two become a couple, much to the chagrin of Bo. Meanwhile, Lenny is harassed by a trio of goons at the beach only to be rescued by Cindy. She takes Lenny to the dojo and asks Robbie to teach him martial arts. Meanwhile, at Dojo Extreme, Kaine's obsession with his style forces his girlfriend Nika to get upset and attempts to use a newcomer at the gym, Derek, to face Kaine. When Kaine uses his "assess, assert, and dismember" method, he breaks Derek's leg and apologizes to Nika.

When Rina calls Robbie and tells him that Bo has hurt her, Robbie flies into a rampage. He finds a bunch of Bo's friends to demand where he is and when they try to fight him, Robbie gets the upper hand. At a pizza parlor, someone makes a viral video of Robbie fighting more of the Dojo Extreme team and it is uploaded for everyone to see. Robbie heads to Dojo Extreme and finds himself outnumbered by Kaine, Bo, and the rest of the dojo. However, Dojo Extreme learns that Robbie didn't come alone. Glen, Cindy, Lenny, and members of the Space Coast Dojo arrive. Robbie and Bo fight inside a cage while the two schools go at it. When one of Dojo Extreme's members pulls out a gun, Cindy stops him and declares the rumble over. Glen follows Kaine to a baseball cage, where the two fight. Meanwhile, Robbie defeats Bo using a grappling move. Meanwhile, Glen and Kaine fight in the cage with baseballs flying at them and then with baseball bats. Glen finally knocks Laurent down and tells him it is over. Kaine soon realizes that everyone does have something to learn.

Two weeks later, Glen, Cindy, Katie (Glen and Cindy's daughter), Robbie, Rina, and Lenny are at the beach when they are being watched from afar by Frank Whitlaw, Bo's father, who vows to get even with the Space Coast Dojo.

== Cast ==
- Don "The Dragon" Wilson as Glen
- Cynthia Rothrock as Cindy
- Jansen Panettiere as Robbie Oakes
- Kathryn Newton as Rina
- Brandon Tyler Russell as Lenny
- Matthew Ziff as Bo Whitlaw
- Kayley Stallings as Katie
- T. J. Storm as Coach Laurent Kaine
- Natasha Blasick as Nika
- Inga Van Ardenn as Inga
- Lorraine Ziff as Peggy
- Jody Nolan as Raymond
- Sydney Sweeney as Julie
- Nassim Lahrizi as Hazma
- Jesse-Jane McParland as Space Coast Dojo Student
- Chuck Zito as Frank Whitlaw
- Billy R. Smith as Derek
- R. Marcos Taylor as Bike Shop Bully
- James R. Wilson as Onlooker in Cincinnati
- Cheryl Wheeler-Dixon as Onlooker in Cincinnati (Uncredited)
- Danny Pardo as Officer Vega

== Production ==
The film was developed by James Wilson, the brother of lead actor Don "The Dragon" Wilson, as a modern-day version of The Karate Kid. When the film was announced, the filmmakers started a Kickstarter fund, in which they exceeded their target goal with $173,486 from 430 backers.

An open casting call was done in April in which over 250 people showed up. Production began on the weekend of June 7, 2014 in Cocoa Beach, Florida and Melbourne, Florida, for six days followed by eight days in Los Angeles, California.

To bring the spirit of martial arts in the film, many well-known martial artists (aside from Wilson, Rothrock, Ziff, and Storm) make cameo appearances in the film, either as instructors or as themselves, which includes Olando Rivera, Christine Bannon-Rodrigues, Jeff W. Smith, Glenn C. Wilson, Carl Van Meter, and Dewey Cooper. Panetierre himself was a real-life black belt in krav maga.

== Reception ==
On Rotten Tomatoes the film has 3 negative reviews.

Martin Tsai of The Los Angeles Times writes: So we have one minority pitted against the other minority in a bid to prove which is worthier of inclusion, while the bad guy who started the fight, Bo, is white.

Monica Castillo of The Village Voice writes: Karate Kid homage offers decent messages, so-so story.

Sandie Angulo Chen of Common Sense Media writes: For a movie starring so many action stars and fighting champs, The Martial Arts Kid falls surprisingly short of winning any medals.

== Awards ==
The film won the Best Florida Film at the Sunscreen Film Festival in St. Petersburg, Florida. Actor Matthew Ziff won the Best Supporting Actor award at the same festival for his role of bully Bo Whitlaw. The film won three awards at the Melbourne Independent Filmmakers Festival including Best Dramatic Feature, Best Music Score, and the Humanitarian Award.

The film also received the highest rating from The Dove Foundation, giving the film 5 out of 5 Doves for "Family Approved Film".

== Release ==
After multiple screenings all over the United States, the DVD and Blu-Ray were released via the film's official website on April 14, 2016.

== Sequel ==
First announced on a featurette on the DVD of the original film, Cynthia Rothrock took to Facebook to announce that pre-production has begun on the sequel, which is to be called The Martial Arts Kid 2: Payback. Don Wilson and Cynthia Rothrock are returning in their roles of Glen and Cindy and Michael Baumgarten is returning to write and direct the sequel. James E. Wilson is returning as producer as well.

An IndieGogo promotion was announced to raise funds for the film on January 15, 2018. Aside from Wilson and Rothrock, original cast members T. J. Storm, Matthew Ziff, Brandon Tyler Russell, and Chuck Zito are returning and new cast members announced include Sasha Mitchell, Anita Clay, Benny Urquidez, and Bill "Superfoot" Wallace.

On February 12, 2020, producer Cheryl Wheeler-Sanders was killed and as a result between this and the COVID-19 pandemic, the sequel had faltered and its status to this day is unknown.
