= Treachery =

Treachery is the betrayal or violation of trust. It may refer to:

- Treachery (law), an offence in several countries, related to treason
- Treachery (Revenge), the eighth episode of the American television series Revenge
- Treachery (film), a film written and directed by Travis Romero and starring Michael Biehn
- "Treachery", a song by Unwound from their 2001 album Leaves Turn Inside You
- The Dark Tower: Treachery, the Stephen King comic book series
- An Old Norse word for Sköll, a wolf in Norse mythology

== See also ==
- Treacherous (disambiguation)
- Treason
