= Claire Wineland =

American activist and author (1997–2018)

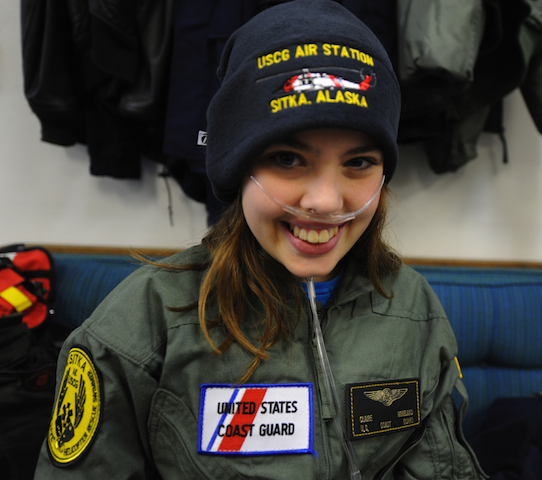
- Wineland in 2010
- Born: April 10, 1997; Austin, Texas, U.S.
- Died: September 2, 2018 (aged 21); San Diego, California, U.S.
- Occupations: Activist, author
- Years active: 2010–2018
- Website: clairesplacefoundation.org

Claire Lucia Wineland (April 10, 1997 – September 2, 2018) was an American activist, author, speaker and social media personality. Through her non-profit organization, Claire's Place Foundation, she provided support to children and families affected by cystic fibrosis (CF). She died from a blood clot one week after receiving a double lung transplant at the age of 21.

Wineland and a friend, Chynna Bracha Levin, wrote the book Every Breath I Take, Surviving and Thriving with Cystic Fibrosis, published by BusinessGhost, Inc. on September 21, 2012.

== Personal life ==
Wineland was born with cystic fibrosis in Austin, Texas. She enjoyed performing from a young age and appeared in The Music Man at age four. At age 13, her lungs failed and she was placed in a medically-induced coma. She was given a 1% chance of survival and awoke after 16 days.

== Activism ==
Wineland founded the Claire's Place Foundation at age 13. Inspired by the community's support while she was in a coma, she launched the 501(c)(3) non-profit to provide support to children with cystic fibrosis and their affected families. The foundation offers both emotional and financial support through their Support Families Network and the Extended Hospital Stay Grants program. The Extended Hospital Stay Grant program provides financial assistance to families with children experiencing a hospital stay of at least 14 consecutive days due to cystic fibrosis. The grants have enabled families to pay their mortgage, rent, medical bills and other essential living expenses. Support Families offers personalized support and assistance in areas such as treatment, care processes and emotional support from other parent volunteers.

"If my biggest problem in life was to be healthy, I'd be incredibly bored. I don't spend any time thinking about the day that I'm cured, or the day that I'm healthier, and that's because I know that on a certain level, it doesn't matter. The moment you realize it's not about avoiding suffering; it's about making something from your suffering, you're incredibly freed. Everything I'm proud of comes from some of the darkest things in my life."

— Claire Wineland, reflecting on her outlook on life. Direct quote published by online women's magazine Glamour three days after her 2018 passing.

Wineland was chosen to be the keynote speaker at AARC Congress, the 63rd International Respiratory Convention and Exhibition. She was a TEDx speaker and spoke at a number of conferences worldwide. She appeared in an episode of Red Band Society and in the documentary series My Last Days. She joined the Philips "Breathless Choir" as a soloist.

=== Clairity Project and YouTube channel ===
The Clairity Project was a website featuring a series of educational videos and vlogs hosted on YouTube which hope to inspire and educate others about living with a terminal illness. According to the website, Wineland's activism aimed "to shed some light on what it's really like to be sick, and change the way we view illness and those living with it.”

On August 7, 2017, after not uploading any videos for over a year, Wineland returned to YouTube with a new account under her real name. Her first uploaded video, "I stopped doing the Clarity Project because I got screwed over," revealed that The Clairity Project was operated by a video editing company and she had little to no control or input over the editing of her videos apart from their filming and creation. She revealed that after taking a break from creating videos for some months due to declining health, the company refused to allow her to log into any accounts relating to The Clairity Project. Due to no formal contracts over ownership of the project being in place, the company continued to profit from the project. Wineland stated she did not have the energy or the money to take the case to court.

Wineland continued to operate her YouTube channel and uploaded nine videos prior to her death.

== Death ==
On August 26, 2018, Wineland underwent a double lung transplant. Shortly after the surgery, Wineland suffered an ischemic stroke due to a blood clot which "cut off blood flow to the right side of her brain." She died on September 2, 2018, at UC San Diego Thornton Pavilion.

== Legacy ==
In 2016, Wineland was listed as one of Seventeen magazine's 17 Power Teens. She was a Fox Teen Choice Award honoree in 2015 and received the Gloria Barron Prize for Young Heroes and Los Angeles Business Journal's Small Nonprofit of the Year Award in 2014. In 2025, Claire's mother, Melissa Yeager, who has carried on as the executive director of the Claire's Place Foundation since Claire's passing, won the Los Angeles Business Journal's Nonprofit Executive of the Year award.

The 2019 film Five Feet Apart was inspired by and dedicated to Wineland, who served as a consultant on the film.

=== Documentary ===
YouTube Originals released "Claire," a documentary about Wineland, which was directed and produced by Academy Award winner Nicholas Reed (“The Lady in Number 6”) and Ryan Azevedo ("Unpinned") and produced by Paul Foley (“Unpinned”). It was released on the first anniversary of Wineland's death. The documentary also features clips from an uncompleted vlog Wineland had filmed to document her lung transplant experience and intended recovery.

== See also ==
- Disability rights movement
- Kirsty Howard
