= The Wrecking Crew (2000 film) =

2000 film directed by Albert Pyun

- Directed by: Albert Pyun
- Written by: Hannah Blue
- Produced by: Paul Rosenblum; Tom Karnowski; Mark Allen; Ice-T
- Starring: Snoop Dogg; Ice-T; Ernie Hudson Jr. Vincent Klyn; Romany Malco; T. J. Storm
- Cinematography: Philip Alan Waters
- Edited by: Errin Vasquez
- Production company: Filmwerks
- Release date: March 21, 2000 (US)
- Running time: 80 minutes
- Country: United States
- Language: English

The Wrecking Crew is a 2000 American crime drama film directed by Albert Pyun and starring Snoop Dogg, Ice-T, and Ernie Hudson Jr.

== Premise ==
A high-level government hit squad led by Ice-T's character, is dispatched out into the streets of Detroit in order to take out Snoop Dogg's character, the leader of the Detroit underworld.

== Cast ==
- Ice-T as "Menace"
- Ernie Hudson Jr. as Hakiem
- T. J. Storm as Josef
- David Askew as "Sly"
- Miss Jones as News Reporter
- Vincent Klyn as Juda
- Romany Malco as "Chewy"
- Rob Ladesich as Captain
- Snoop Dogg as "Dra-Man"
- Jahi J.J. Zuri as "Ceebo"

== Production ==
The director Albert Pyun shot the film simultaneously with two other "urban" features, Urban Menace and Corrupt, making sure his producers got the most out of their money as it was filmed in Eastern Europe on a shoestring budget.

== Reception ==
Michael Dequina of TheMovieReport.com rated it 0 out of 4 and stated "There should be a reward for watching three straight-to-tape Ice-T starring vehicles, for there are few methods of torture that are more inhumane."

== See also ==
- List of hood films
