= Vincent Klyn =

American surfer and actor

- Born: Vincent Klijn; June 30, 1960 (age 64); New Zealand
- Other names: Vince Klyn
- Occupations: Surfer; Actor

Vincent Klyn (née Klijn; born June 30, 1960) is a New Zealand-born American professional surfer and actor.

== Biography ==
Vincent Klyn was born in New Zealand, and moved to Honolulu, Hawaii when he was four years old. He began surfing at the age of 10, and went on to compete on the professional surfing circuit three years later. Klyn was a competitor in the World Wide Surf tour, and was among the top five surfers in the world at that time.

His first and probably most remembered film appearance was his film debut in the 1989 science fiction action film Cyborg, as the main villain Fender Tremolo, playing opposite Jean-Claude Van Damme as the hero, Gibson Rickenbacker. According to the audio commentary on the DVD for Urban Menace, director Albert Pyun found Klyn when he saw him surfing one day, and immediately thought he would be an excellent choice to play a villain, as he had an outstanding physique and intense look.

He went on to appear in minor roles in other surfer films, like Red Surf (teaming up with George Clooney) in 1990, and Point Break (going up against Patrick Swayze and Keanu Reeves) in 1991, but with the exception of Gangland from 2000, he still got the bulk of his major roles in movies directed by Albert Pyun, like Bloodmatch, Kickboxer 2, Dollman, Nemesis, Knights, Blast, The Wrecking Crew, Corrupt, Urban Menace, and Max Havoc: Curse of the Dragon from 2004.

Other roles that Klyn appeared in were mostly noted as on-screen personalities on the Baywatch television series throughout the 1990s and the 2000s, and he appeared in the episode "Showdown" in the television series The Adventures of Brisco County, Jr.
