= List of hood films =

Film genre originating in the United States

This is a list of hood films. These films focus on the culture and life of African Americans, Hispanic-Americans, and, in some cases, Asian-Americans or White Americans who live in segregated, low-income urban communities. This list also includes comparably economically disenfranchised and crime adjacent communities in other countries such as the UK and Canada.

== List of hood films by year ==
=== 1970s ===
- Cooley High, 1975
- Walk Proud, 1979

=== 1980s ===
- Colors, 1988
- Do the Right Thing, 1989

=== 1990s ===
- Streets, 1990
- New Jack City, 1991
- Boyz n the Hood, 1991
- Straight Out of Brooklyn, 1991
- Deep Cover, 1992
- Juice, 1992
- Just Another Girl on the I.R.T., 1992
- South Central, 1992
- Trespass, 1992
- Zebrahead, 1992
- Menace II Society, 1993
- Blood In Blood Out, 1993
- Poetic Justice, 1993
- I Like It Like That, 1994
- Sugar Hill, 1994
- Mi Vida Loca, 1994
- Fresh, 1994
- Jason's Lyric, 1994
- Rude, 1995
- Soul Survivor, 1995
- Tales from the Hood, 1995
- Clockers, 1995
- Dangerous Minds, 1995
- Dead Presidents, 1995
- Friday, 1995
- New Jersey Drive, 1995
- La Haine, 1995
- Raï, 1995
- Set It Off, 1996
- One Eight Seven, 1997
- Fakin' da Funk, 1997
- Hurricane Streets, 1997
- I'm Bout It, 1997
- Ma 6-T va crack-er, 1997
- American History X, 1998
- Streets Is Watching, 1998
- Short Sharp Shock, 1998
- I Got the Hook-Up, 1998
- Belly, 1998
- Slam, 1998
- In Too Deep, 1999
- Corrupt, 1999
- Thicker than Water, 1999
- Urban Menace, 1999

=== 2000s ===
- Next Friday, 2000
- 3 Strikes, 2000
- Baller Blockin', 2000
- Leprechaun in the Hood, 2000
- Tha Eastsidaz, 2000
- Baby Boy, 2001
- Choices: The Movie, 2001
- Prison Song, 2001
- Brooklyn Babylon, 2001
- Blue Hill Avenue, 2001
- Training Day, 2001
- How High, 2001
- Paper Soldiers, 2002
- Barbershop, 2002
- City of God, 2002
- 8 Mile, 2002
- Friday After Next, (2002)
- State Property, 2002
- Paid in Full, 2002
- Leprechaun: Back 2 tha Hood, 2003
- Bullet Boy, 2004
- Murda Muzik, 2004
- Never Die Alone, 2004
- Back in the Day, 2005
- Hustle & Flow, 2005
- Get Rich or Die Tryin', 2005
- Hood of the Living Dead, 2005
- ATL, 2006
- Kidulthood, 2006
- Waist Deep, 2006
- Killa Season, 2006
- Tough Enough, 2006
- City of Men, 2007
- Adulthood, 2008
- Before I Self Destruct, 2009
- Notorious, 2009

=== 2010s ===
- Shank, 2010
- Attack the Block, 2011
- Ill Manors, 2012
- Girlhood, 2014
- Blame It On the Streets, 2014
- Imperial Dreams, 2014
- Dope, 2015
- Straight Outta Compton, 2015
- Chi-Raq, 2015
- Tangerine, 2015
- Kicks, 2016
- Brotherhood, 2016
- Moonlight, 2016
- Cardboard Gangsters, 2017
- Roxanne Roxanne, 2017
- Gook, 2017
- The First Purge, 2018
- Blue Story, 2019
- Street Flow, 2019

=== 2020s ===
- All Day and a Night, 2020
- Cut Throat City, 2020
- One of Them Days, 2025

=== Parodies ===
- House Party, 1990
- CB4, 1993
- Fear of a Black Hat, 1994
- Don't Be a Menace to South Central While Drinking Your Juice in the Hood, 1996
- High School High, 1996
- Anuvahood, 2011
- Sumotherhood, 2023

== See also ==
- African American cinema
- Blaxploitation, film genre
- Gangster film
- List of prison films
- Quinqui (film genre)
