= Radio Fusion Radio =

Studio album by the College Boyz
- Released: April 7, 1992
- Recorded: 1991–1992
- Genre: Hip-hop
- Length: 48:24
- Label: Virgin
- Producer: Adonis; Dez; DJ Ron-Ski; Eric "Quicksilver" Johnson; Humphrey Riley; I-Roc; Jammin' James Carter; Karl F. Stephenson; Tony Joseph; Wiz1

The College Boyz chronology
Radio Fusion Radio (1992)	Nuttin' Less Nuttin' Mo' (1994)

Singles from Radio Fusion Radio
- 1. "Victim of the Ghetto" Released: February 20, 1992; 2. "Hollywood Paradox" Released: June 30, 1992; 3. "Humpin" Released: September 22, 1992

Professional ratings
Review scores
Source	Rating
AllMusic	2/5 stars
RapReviews	6.5/10

Radio Fusion Radio is the debut studio album by American rap group the College Boyz. It was released on April 7, 1992, through Virgin Records. The album peaked at number 118 on the Billboard 200, number 25 on the Top R&B/Hip-Hop Albums and number 2 on the Top Heatseekers charts in the United States. Three singles — "Victim of the Ghetto", "Hollywood Paradox" and "Humpin" — also made the Billboard charts. Its lead single, "Victim of the Ghetto", reached No. 68 on the Billboard Hot 100, No. 28 on both the Dance Music/Maxi Singles Sales and the Hot R&B/Hip-Hop Singles and No. 4 on the Hot Rap Singles charts. The second single off of the album, "Hollywood Paradox", peaked at number No. 65 on the Hot R&B/Hip-Hop Singles and number 10 on the Hot Rap Singles charts. The album's third and final single, "Humpin", made it to No. 14 on the Hot Rap Singles chart.

== Track listing ==
No.	Title	Writer(s)	Producer(s)	Length
1.	"Victim of the Ghetto"	Romany Malco; Tony Joseph; Eric Johnson	Tony Joseph; Eric "Quicksilver" Johnson	4:53
2.	"Interlude: Radio Fusion Radio"			0:28
3.	"Hollywood Paradox"	Malco; Larry Barker; Robert Orr	Dez; Adonis; Johan Langlie (co.); Rom (co.); Squeak (co.)	3:45
4.	"Politics of a Gangster"	Malco; Chris Charles; James Calvin Carter	I-Roc; Jammin' James Carter	3:53
5.	"Underground Blues"	Malco; Tyrone Thomas; August Moon	Humphrey Riley; DJ Ron-Ski; Wiz1	3:22
6.	"Interlude: The Homeless"			0:52
7.	"Rigmarole"	Malco; Corey Williams; Humphrey Riley; Ron Williams	Humphrey Riley; DJ Ron-Ski	3:13
8.	"Interlude: After These Messages"			0:05
9.	"Interlude: Peter Pump"			0:53
10.	"Interlude: I Gotcha"			0:39
11.	"Humpin'"	Malco; Charlie Wilson; Lonnie Simmons; Ronnie Wilson; Rudy Taylor	Dez; Adonis; Johan Langlie (co.); Rom (co.); Squeak (co.)	5:03
12.	"Interlude: Phone Sex"			0:33
13.	"College Boyz in the House"	Malco; Charles; Carter	I-Roc; Jammin' James Carter	3:45
14.	"Interlude: Concerned Parent"			0:09
15.	"Real Man"	Malco; William Robinson; Lamont Dozier; Edward Holland; Brian Holland; Frank De Vol	Dez; Adonis; Johan Langlie (co.)	3:59
16.	"Interlude: Highroller Parade"			0:32
17.	"How ta Act"	Malco; George Clinton; Phillipe Wynn	Humphrey Riley; DJ Ron-Ski; Wiz1	3:15
18.	"Interlude: Tips of the Day"			1:08
19.	"Funky Quartet of the Day"	Malco; Betty Wright; Willy Clarke	Karl F. Stephenson	3:19
20.	"Interlude: Who the Fuck Is This?"			0:38
21.	"Politics of a Gangster Dub"	Charles; Carter	I-Roc; Jammin' James Carter	4:14
Total length:				48:24

Sample credits

- Track 3 contains material by the Isley Brothers.
- Tracks 4 and 21 contain a sample of "I'm Gonna Love You Just a Little More Baby" written by Barry White.
- Track 5 contains a sample of "Good Times" written by Nile Rodgers and Bernard Edwards and performed by Chic.
- Track 9 samples "Boogie Oogie Oogie" written by Janice-Marie Johnson and Perry Kibble and performed by A Taste of Honey.
- Track 10 contains material from "Funeral March of a Marionette" written by Charles Gounod.
- Track 11 contains material by the Gap Band.
- Track 12 samples "(If Loving You Is Wrong) I Don't Want to Be Right" written by Homer Banks and Carl Hampton and performed by Luther Ingram.
- Track 15 contains material by the Temptations and the Supremes.
- Track 17 contains a sample of "(Not Just) Knee Deep" written by George Clinton III and Phillip Wynne.
- Track 19 contains material by Betty Wright.

== Personnel ==
- The College Boyz — barking (track 15)
  - Romany Malco — lead rap vocals (tracks: 1, 3, 5, 7, 11, 15, 17), rap vocals (tracks: 4, 13), background vocals (track 7), performer (tracks: 9, 14), co-producer (tracks: 3, 11)
  - Squeaky G a.k.a. Squeak — background rap vocals (tracks: 4, 13), background vocals (tracks: 7, 11, 17), rap vocals (track 11), co-producer (tracks: 3, 11), singing vocals (track 15), vocals (track 19)
  - Cue the DJ — performer (tracks: 2, 6, 11, 18), vocals (track 16), singing vocals (track 15), background vocals (track 17)
  - DJ B-Selector — performer (tracks: 10, 18), scratches (track 19)
- Brenda Jean Sims — hook vocals (track 1)
- Crystal Carlisle — background vocals (track 3)
- Crazy Tone — performer (tracks: 6, 10, 18)
- Humphrey Riley — background vocals (track 7), producer (tracks: 5, 7, 17)
- Susan — background vocals (track 7)
- Sir Spence — background vocals (track 11)
- Claudia Mislap — voice (track 12)
- Steve Mislap — performer (track 14)
- Vicky Calhoun — vocals (track 15)
- Rochelle Shelby — vocals (track 15)
- Monique Maflei — vocals (track 15)
- Denise Deveaux — vocals (track 15)
- Adonis — barking (track 15), producer (tracks: 3, 11, 15)
- Anonna Coutee — background vocals (track 17)
- Taicia — performer (track 18)
- Buddy Vandell — vocals (track 19)
- Sweet Pea Atkinson — vocals (track 19)
- Darren Walker — performer (track 20)
- Phil Gordy — keyboards (track 1)
- Kevin O'Neal — bass guitar (track 1)
- Dez — lead and rhythm guitar (track 3), producer (tracks: 3, 11, 15)
- Johan Langlie — bass keyboards (track 3), drum programming (tracks: 3, 11, 15), keyboard programming (tracks: 11, 15), co-producer (tracks: 3, 11, 15)
- Clifford Solomon — saxophone (track 3)
- June of M N' M — scratches (track 3)
- Marquis "Hami" Dair — bass guitar & keyboards (tracks: 4, 13, 21)
- Chris "I-Roc" Charles — drum programming & producer (tracks: 4, 13, 21)
- "Jammin" James Carter — drum programming & producer (tracks: 4, 13, 21), scratches (track 13)
- DJ Tray Ski — scratches (tracks: 4, 21)
- Chris Horvath — guitar (track 5)
- DJ Ron-Ski — scratches & producer (tracks: 5, 7, 17)
- Michael Mislap — keyboards (track 10), engineering (tracks: 2, 6, 8–10, 12, 14, 16, 18, 20)
- Karl F. Stephenson — keyboards & producer (track 19)
- Mark Poniatowski — upright bass (track 19)
- Willie McNeal — drums (track 19)
- Tony Joseph — producer (track 1)
- Eric "Quicksilver" Johnson — producer (track 1)
- Wiz1 — producer (tracks: 5, 17)
- Fred Howard — engineering (track 1)
- Derek Sample — engineering (tracks: 3, 11, 15)
- Bob Drake — engineering (tracks: 4, 13, 21)
- Bob Morse — engineering (tracks: 5, 7, 17)
- Tom Rothrock — engineering (track 19)
- Rob Schaff — engineering (track 19)
- Dan Hersch — mastering
- Gemma Corfield — executive producer
- Melanie Nissen — art direction

== Charts ==
=== Weekly charts ===
Chart (1992)	Peak position
US Billboard 200	118
US Top R&B/Hip-Hop Albums (Billboard)	25
US Heatseekers Albums (Billboard)	2

=== Year-end charts ===
Chart (1992)	Position
US Top R&B/Hip-Hop Albums (Billboard)	72
