= College Boyz =

American hip hop group

- College Boyz

Background information
- Also known as: RMG
- Origin: Los Angeles, California, United States
- Genres: Hip hop
- Years active: 1991–1994
- Label: Virgin/EMI Records
- Members: R.O.M. Squeak; B. Selector; DJ Cue

The College Boyz was an American hip hop group and voice actors composed of R.O.M., Squeak, B. Selector and DJ Cue.

The group was signed to Virgin Records. Originally calling itself RMG, the group changed its name to College Boyz upon moving to Los Angeles.

They released their debut, Radio Fusion Radio, on April 7, 1992, through Virgin Records. The album was not a huge success, but it managed to make it to three different charts, peaking at No. 118 on the Billboard 200, No. 25 on the Top R&B/Hip-Hop Albums and No. 2 on the Top Heatseekers. Radio Fusion Radio also featured the hit single "Victim of the Ghetto", which peaked at No. 68 on the Billboard Hot 100 and No. 1 on the Hot Rap Singles.

On October 4, 1994, the group released their second and final album Nuttin' Less Nuttin' Mo'. It made it to No. 80 on the Top R&B/Hip-Hop Albums, and producing a single "Rollin" that reached No. 49 on the Hot Rap Singles. The College Boyz disbanded in 1994 with Romany "R.O.M." Malco eventually becoming a successful actor, and DJ Cue going on to found The Row Church Without Walls in Los Angeles's Skid Row neighborhood.

== Discography ==
=== Albums ===
Year	Album	Chart Positions		
Year	Album	US	US Hip-Hop	Heatseekers
1992	Radio Fusion Radio	118	25	2
1994	Nuttin' Less Nuttin' Mo'	-	80	-
"—" denotes the album failed to chart or not released
