= Ernie Hudson Jr. =

American actor

- Born: Earnest Lee Hudson Jr. Benton Harbor, Michigan, U.S.
- Education: LIU Post (BA); California University of Pennsylvania (MS)
- Occupations: Film, television actor
- Years active: 1984–present
- Father: Ernie Hudson

Earnest Lee "Ernie" Hudson Jr. is an American actor, writer, and film producer.

== Life and career ==
He is the son of Ernie Hudson and his first wife, Jeannie Moore. After the couple divorced, Ernie Jr. lived with his father. He attended the California University of Pennsylvania, completing a Masters of Science in Exercise Science, before taking up acting.

Ernie Jr. appeared in a number of films and television shows between the 1980s and the 2000s. He had a recurring role in Oz in 1999-2000, appearing alongside his father as inmate "Hamid Khan".

More recently he has published poetry and worked in corporate management coaching and consultation. In 2021 he was affirmed as Togbui Kpogo Afenya I, an Ewe Chief in Ghana. He is a member of Mensa and has a 5th Degree Black Belt in Kenpo Karate. He has three children and three grandchildren.

== Filmography ==
=== Film ===
Year	Title	Role	Notes
1997	Butter	Marcus	
1998	Candyman: Day of the Dead	Jamal Matthews	
1999	Corrupt	Miles	
1999	Urban Menace	No-Dice	
2000	The Wrecking Crew	Hakeim	
2000	Swordfish	Unnamed Character	
2000	Our Lips Are Sealed	Agent Bruce Banner / Hulk	
2006	Double Down	Officer Rico	Co-Producer
2016	The Karma Club	Tank Parker	Also Associate Producer

=== Television ===
Year	Title	Role	Notes
1984	TJ Hooker	Breakdancer	Episode "The Two Faces of Betsy Morgan"
1998	Soldier of Fortune, Inc.	Soldier	Episode "Hired Guns"
1998	Martial Law	Floyd Cross	Episode "How Sammo Got His Groove Back"
1999	The Practice	Testifying Officer	Episode "Legacy"
1999-2000	Oz	Hamid Khan	Recurring role
2000	Touched by an Angel	Joe Hicks	Episode "The Whole Truth and Nothing But..."
2000	The Norm Show	Clerk	Episode "Norm vs the Boxer"
2000	JAG	Master Chief	Episode "Hero Worship"

=== Voice Over ===
Year	Title	Role	Notes
2004	BMW		
2002	Johnson & Johnson		
2000	Squirt Soda		

=== Books ===
Year	Title	Notes
2016	Freestyle Prophecies & Sacred Ciphers	Self Published
