= Tijuana Jackson: Purpose Over Prison =

- Directed by: Romany Malco
- Written by: Romany Malco
- Produced by: Josh Etting; Brian R. Etting
- Starring: Romany Malco
- Production companies: Will Packer Productions; Garlin Pictures
- Distributed by: Cranked Up Films
- Release date: July 10, 2020
- Running time: 93 minutes
- Country: United States
- Language: English

Tijuana Jackson: Purpose Over Prison is a 2020 American comedy film written by, directed by and starring Romany Malco.

== Cast ==
- Romany Malco as Tijuana Jackson
- Regina Hall as Cheryl Wagner
- Alkoya Brunson Lil' Eric Jackson
- Shannon Dang as Rachel Cho
- Tami Roman as Sharea Jackson
- Lyne Odums as Momma Jackson

== Release ==
The film was released on demand on July 10, 2020.

== Reception ==
The film has a 67% rating on Rotten Tomatoes based on six reviews. Johnny Oleksinski of the New York Post awarded the film two stars out of four. Jeffrey M. Anderson of the San Francisco Examiner awarded the film three stars. Joyce Slaton of Common Sense Media awarded the film four stars out of five.
