= Romany Malco =

American actor (born 1968)

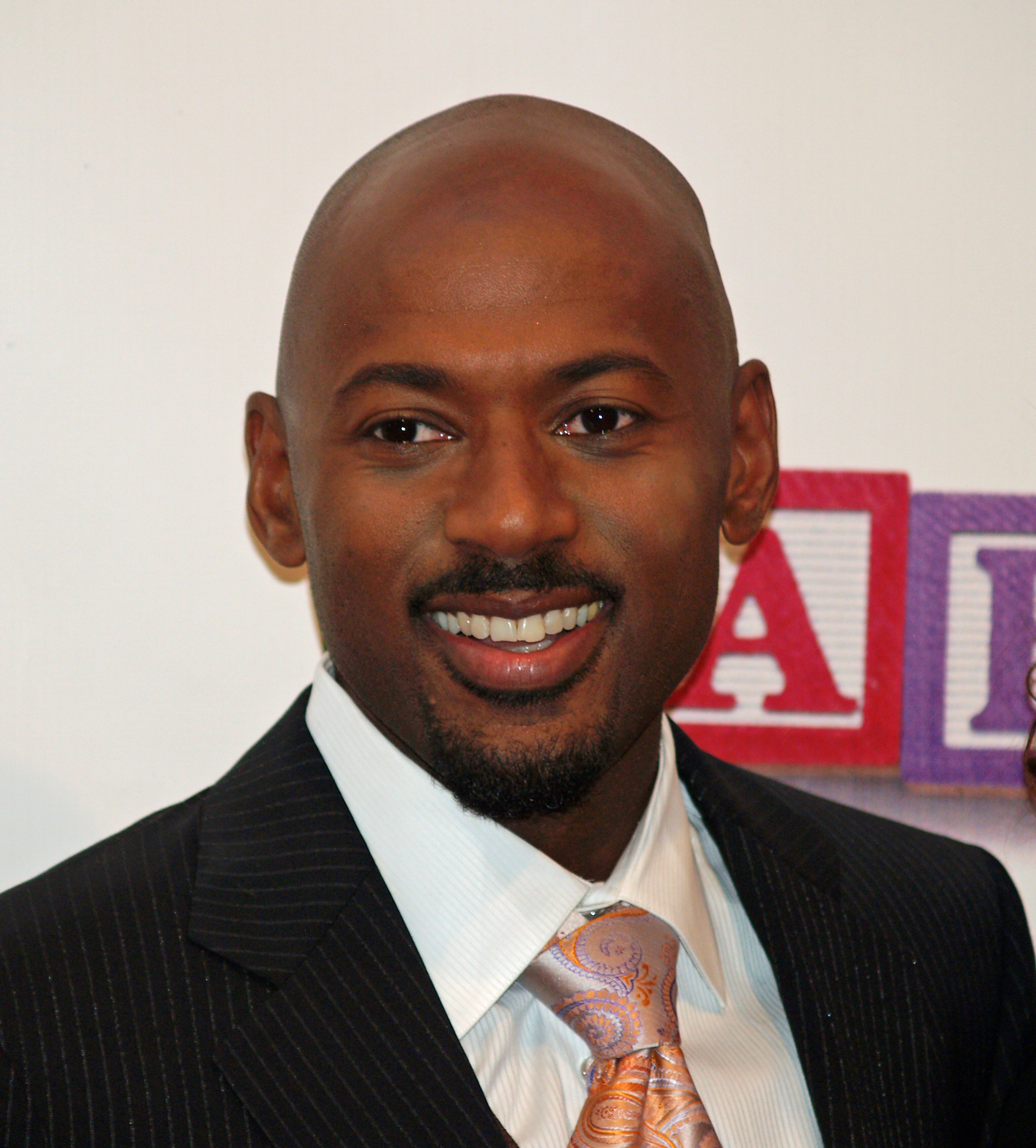
- Malco at the premiere of Baby Mama at the 2008 Tribeca Film Festival.
- Born: Romany Romanic Malco Jr. November 18, 1968 (age 57); Brooklyn, New York, U.S.
- Occupations: Actor; producer; rapper; screenwriter
- Years active: 1988–present
- Spouse: Taryn Dakha (m. 2008; div. 2016)
- Children: 1

Romany Romanic Malco Jr. (born November 18, 1968) is an American actor, rapper, and music producer. He has been nominated for several awards, including an NAACP Image Award, MTV Movie Award, and Screen Actors Guild Award. In film, he is best known for his roles in The 40-Year-Old Virgin (2005), Baby Mama (2008), Think Like a Man (2012) and its sequel Think Like a Man Too (2014), and The DUFF (2015). In television, he is best known for portraying Conrad Shepard on the Showtime series Weeds (2005–2012) and Rome Howard on the ABC series A Million Little Things (2018–2023). He is also known for writing the rap lyrics for the character of MC Skat Kat in "Opposites Attract".

== Personal life ==
Malco was born in Brooklyn, New York. His family is from Trinidad and Tobago.

Malco's family moved to Baytown, Texas when he was a young boy, and he attended Ross S. Sterling High School.

Malco served in the United States Marine Corps from 1987 to 1991.

In 2008, he married former ice skater Taryn Dakha, the stunt/body double for Jessica Alba. They met in 2007 on the set of the 2008 film The Love Guru.

In 2015, Malco decided to move to Puerto Rico while filming Mad Dogs there. During an interview on ABC's The Chew, Malco said he "couldn't leave" and that living on the island made him feel he was "living the dream".

Malco has a son, born in 2021.

== Music career ==
After high school graduation, Malco formed the rap group R.M.G. The group moved to Los Angeles and signed a deal with Virgin Records in 1991. The group's name was changed to College Boyz. The single "Victim of the Ghetto", off their 1992 album Radio Fusion Radio, went to #2 on the rap charts.

Malco is often mistakenly credited for performing one of the raps as MC Skat Kat on the Grammy Award–winning "Opposites Attract", a duet with Paula Abdul. On October 29, 2013, Malco told Wendy Williams that he wrote the rap, but did not perform it. He mentioned running into Paula Abdul and asking her, "Who keeps telling people that I'm the cat?" and she responded, "I do, it makes a better story." Malco said that Derrick "Delite" Stevens was the one that rapped the duet with Abdul.

== Acting career ==
Malco was working as a music producer on The Pest when John Leguizamo, impressed by his dynamic personality, encouraged Romany to pursue acting. After several film and television appearances, his breakthrough came in 2005 with supporting roles in the Judd Apatow comedy film The 40-Year-Old Virgin and the Showtime dark-comedy series Weeds. He continued playing supporting roles in comedies, with appearances in such films as Blades of Glory, The Love Guru, and Baby Mama.

He appeared in the Gulliver's Travels adaptation (2010). In the fall of 2010, Malco appeared as a member of the ABC primetime one-hour drama No Ordinary Family. He played in A Little Bit of Heaven (2011). He also appeared as a guest host on the popular YouTube series, Equals Three, on the episode "T-Painful".

In 2013, he played a concierge in the movie Last Vegas, alongside Robert De Niro, Morgan Freeman, Kevin Kline, and Michael Douglas.

Malco played Rome Howard on the ABC series A Million Little Things (2018–2023) until the series ended.

== Filmography ==
=== Film ===
Year	Title	Role	Notes
1989	Opposites Attract	Taboo (voice)	Video short
1990	Skat Strut	Taboo (voice)	Video short
1992	Big Time	Taboo (voice)	Video short
1999	Urban Menace	Syn	
1999	Corrupt	Snackbar Dude	
2000	The Wrecking Crew	Chewy	
2000	The Prime Gig	Zeke	
2001	The Château	Allen Rex Granville	
2001	Ticker	T.J.	
2002	White Boy	Mike Robinson	
2002	The Tuxedo	Mitch	
2004	True Vinyl	Nite Owl	
2004	Churchill: The Hollywood Years	Denzil Eisenhower	
2005	The 40-Year-Old Virgin	Jay	Nominated—MTV Movie Award for Best On-Screen Team (shared with Steve Carell, Seth Rogen and Paul Rudd)
2006	The Ex	Dr. Hakeem Oliver	
2007	Blades of Glory	Jesse	
2008	Baby Mama	Oscar Priyan	
2008	The Love Guru	Darren Roanoke	
2010	Saint John of Las Vegas	Virgil	
2010	Gulliver's Travels	Young Hank	
2011	A Little Bit of Heaven	Peter Cooper	
2012	Think Like a Man	Zeke Freeman	
2013	Last Vegas	Lonnie	
2014	Think Like a Man Too	Zeke Freeman	
2014	Top Five	Benny Barnes	
2015	The DUFF	Principal Buchanon	
2016	When the Bough Breaks	Todd	
2016	Almost Christmas	Christian Meyers	
2018	Tijuana Jackson: Purpose Over Prison	Tijuana Jackson	Also writer and director
2018	Night School	Jaylen	
2019	Holiday Rush	Rashon "Rush" Williams	

=== Television ===
Year	Title	Role	Notes
1998	Touched by an Angel	Bulldog	Episode: "Redeeming Love"
1998	For Your Love	Frank "Heavyhands" Cato	Episode: "The Hair Club for Men"
2000–2001	Level 9	Jerry Hooten	Series regular
2001	Too Legit: The MC Hammer Story	MC Hammer	Television movie
2003	Miss Match	Master Z	Episode: "Jive Turkey"
2005–2008, 2012	Weeds	Conrad Shepard	Series regular in seasons 1–3, season 8 guest star
2006	American Dad!	Skittle/Refugee/Hot Rod	Voice only, episode: "Camp Refoogee"
2009	Bored to Death	Gay Male Escort	Episode: "The Case of the Lonely White Dove"
2010–2011	No Ordinary Family	George St. Cloud	Series regular
2011	Funny or Die Presents	Tijuana Jackson	3 episodes
2011	Prison Logic	Tijuana Jackson	10 episodes
2011	The Good Wife	Justin Coyne	3 episodes
2012	Unsupervised	Darius	Series regular, voice only
2013	Real Husbands of Hollywood	Himself	2 episodes
2014	Key & Peele	Johnson Family Member	Episode: "Alien Impostors"
2015–2016	Blunt Talk	Bob Gardner	12 episodes
2015–2016	Mad Dogs	Gus	Series regular
2018–2023	A Million Little Things	Rome Howard	Series regular

=== Podcasts ===
Year	Title	Role	Notes
2011	NSFW Show	Tijuana Jackson	Guest star, episode #77: "The Science of Triumph"
2012	NSFW Show	Self	Guest star, episode #122: "The Belt Guru"
2012	The Nerdist Podcast	Self	Guest star, episode #199: "Romany Malco"
2012	Juan Epstein Podcast	Self	Guest star, season #4 episode #12: "Romany Malco (The Black Guy from Everything) and Anthony Jeselnik"
2012	Equals Three	Self	Guest Host, episode 'T-Painful': "Romany Malco"
2014	Sklarbro Country	Self	Guest, episode #202: "Romany Malco, David Huntsberger"
2014	WTF with Marc Maron	Self	Guest, episode # 509: "Romany Malco"
2016	Night Attack	Self	Guest, episode # 135: "Prison Logic Attack (w/ Romany Malco)"
2016	Guys We F****d	Self	Guest, episode "How would you wear breaks off a p***y?"

== Awards and nominations ==
=== Nominations ===
Image Awards

- 2008 – Outstanding Supporting Actor in a Comedy Series (Weeds)
- 2007 – Outstanding Supporting Actor in a Comedy Series (Weeds)

MTV Movie Awards

- 2006 – Best Breakthrough Performance (The 40-Year-Old Virgin)
- 2006 – Best On-Screen Team (The 40-Year-Old Virgin) [Shared with Steve Carell, Paul Rudd, and Seth Rogen]

Screen Actors Guild Awards

- 2007 – Outstanding Performance by an Ensemble in a Comedy Series (Weeds)
