= Ernie Hudson =

American actor (born 1945)

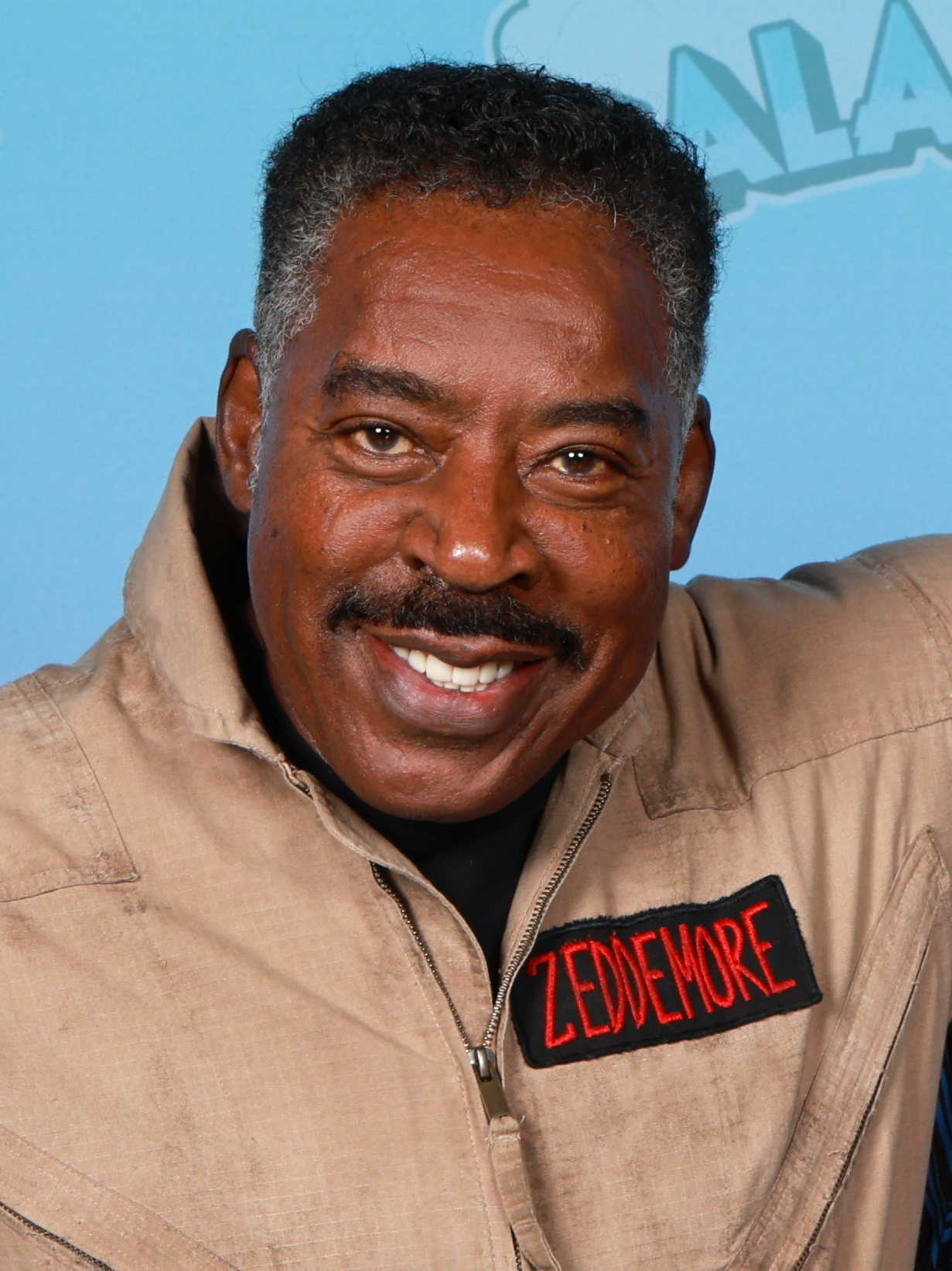
- Hudson at the 2024 Raleigh GalaxyCon
- Born: Earnest Lee Hudson; December 17, 1945 (age 80); Benton Harbor, Michigan, U.S.
- Education: Wayne State University (BFA); University of Minnesota (attended); Yale University (attended)
- Occupations: Actor; playwright; producer
- Years active: 1973–present
- Spouses: Jeannie Moore (m. 1963; div. 1976); Linda Kingsberg (m. 1985)
- Children: 4, including Ernie Jr.

Earnest Lee "Ernie" Hudson (born December 17, 1945) is an American actor. He is known for his role as Winston Zeddemore in the Ghostbusters franchise. Hudson has also acted in the films Leviathan (1989), The Hand That Rocks the Cradle (1992), The Crow (1994), Airheads (1994), The Basketball Diaries (1995), Congo (1995), Miss Congeniality (2000), and The Ron Clark Story (2006).

On television, his most prominent role was Warden Leo Glynn on HBO's Oz (1997–2003). Hudson has also appeared in the television shows St. Elsewhere (1984), The Last Precinct (1986), 10-8: Officers on Duty (2003–2004), Desperate Housewives (2006–2007), The Secret Life of the American Teenager (2008–2013), Law & Order (2009–2010), the voice of Agent Bill Fowler in Transformers: Prime (2010–2013), Franklin & Bash (2012–2014), Grace and Frankie (2015–2020), and L.A.'s Finest (2019–2020). From 2022 to 2024, Hudson appeared as Herbert "Magic" Williams on the NBC drama Quantum Leap. In 2026, he voiced Combat Carl in Toy Story 5 (2026) succeeding the longtime Carl Weathers who died in 2024.

== Early life ==
Hudson was born on December 17, 1945, in Benton Harbor, Michigan. He never knew his father. His mother, Maggie Donald, died of tuberculosis when he was two months old. He was subsequently raised by his maternal grandmother, Arrana Donald.

Hudson joined the U.S. Marine Corps immediately after high school but was discharged after only three months on medical grounds due to asthma. Having moved to Detroit, he became the resident playwright at Concept East, the oldest black theater company in the United States. Hudson enrolled at Wayne State University to develop his writing and acting skills further, graduating in 1973. He established the Actors' Ensemble Theatre where he and other talented young black writers directed and appeared in their own works. Hudson began a doctoral program at the University of Minnesota, Twin Cities before leaving to appear in a stage production of The Great White Hope. Later, he studied toward a Master of Fine Arts in acting at Yale School of Drama but left after a year to appear in Leadbelly.

In an interview with Belief.net, Hudson stated that he is a practicing Christian but does not believe that "one church is the right one".

== Career ==
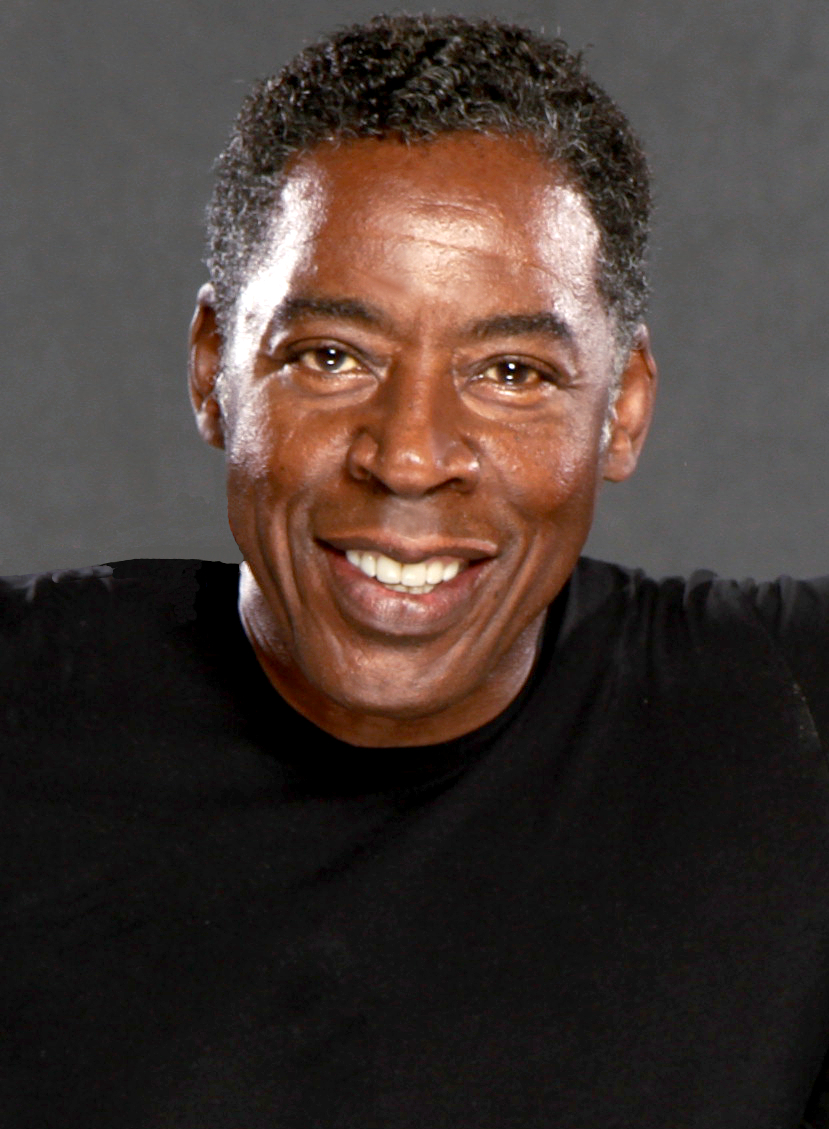
Hudson at the 2014 Florida Super Con

One of Hudson's early film roles is in Penitentiary II (1982) starring Leon Isaac Kennedy. He had various guest roles on television series such as The Dukes of Hazzard and The A-Team. He was on the television series Fantasy Island in a first-season episode as a voodoo man named Jamu. Hudson gained fame playing Winston Zeddemore in the 1984 feature film Ghostbusters and its 1989 sequel, Ghostbusters II. He auditioned to reprise the role for the animated series, The Real Ghostbusters, but it was given to Arsenio Hall. He had a major supporting role as the developmentally disabled handyman Solomon in The Hand that Rocks the Cradle (1992).

Hudson was cast as Warden Leo Glynn on HBO's series Oz, and his son Ernie Hudson Jr. co-starred with him as Muslim inmate Hamid Khan. Hudson also appears as the character Munro in Congo (1995) and as Police Sergeant Albrecht in The Crow (1994). He switched gears when he played a preacher opening the eyes of a small town's prejudice in the 1950s in A Stranger in the Kingdom. He played Harry McDonald, the FBI superior of Sandra Bullock's character in the feature film Miss Congeniality (2000). He is in the Stargate SG-1 episode "Ethon" as Pernaux. He appeared as Reggie in the 1995 film The Basketball Diaries. In 2006, he appeared in the television film The Ron Clark Story as Principal Turner. In 2008, he began a recurring role as Dr. Fields on The Secret Life of the American Teenager. He had a recurring role on the final season of Law & Order as Lt. Anita Van Buren's boyfriend and then fiancé.

In 2011, he played Stuart Owens in Torchwood: Miracle Day.

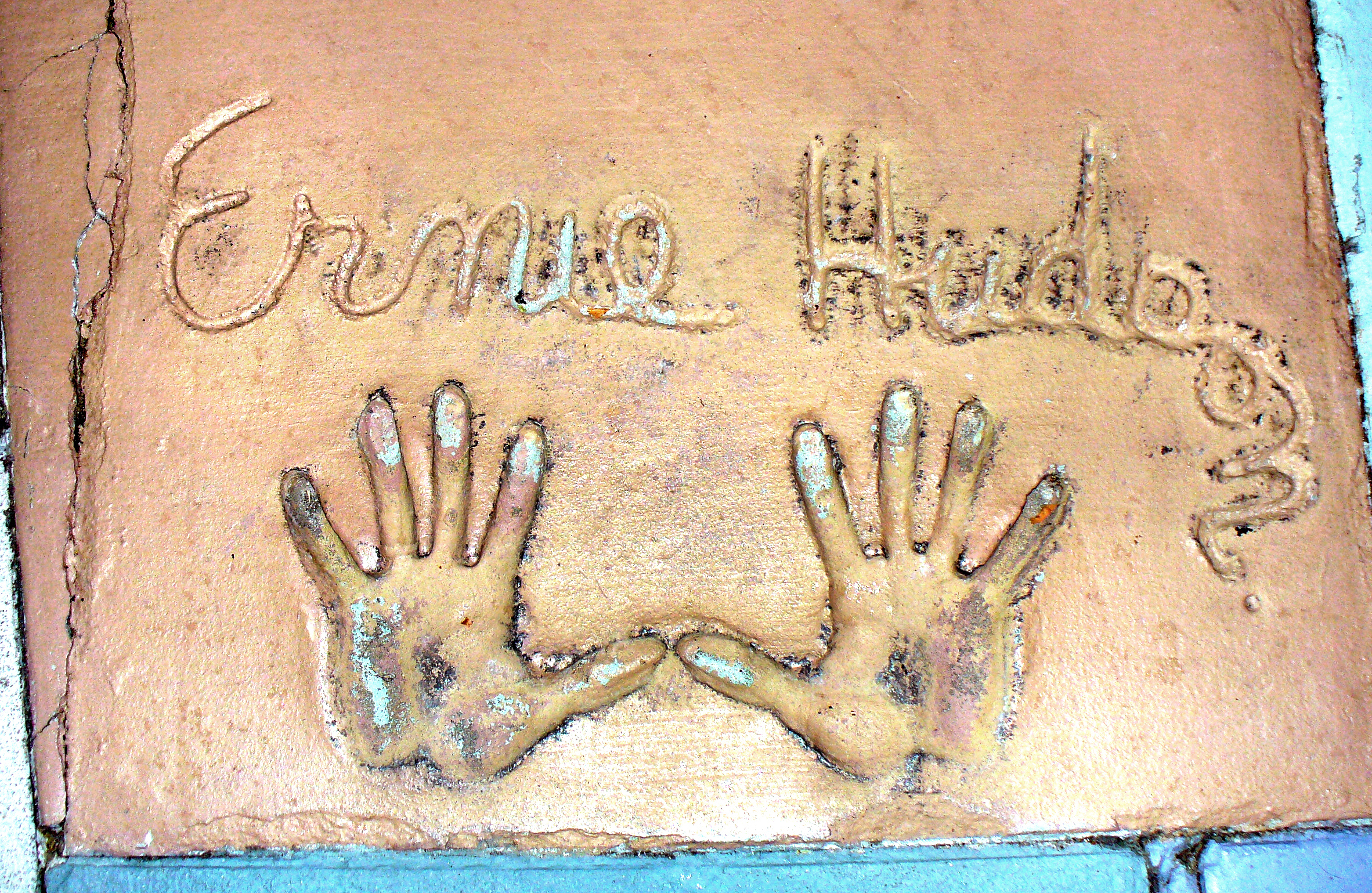
Handprints of Hudson in front of The Great Movie Ride at Disney's Hollywood Studios theme park

Beginning in 2015, Hudson was cast in a recurring role as Jacob, an organic farmer who is the romantic interest for Frankie Bergstein (Lily Tomlin) in the series Grace and Frankie.

Hudson appeared in the 2016 Ghostbusters reboot, playing Bill Jenkins, the uncle of Leslie Jones's lead character Pattie Tolan.

In 2019, Hudson began starring in L.A.'s Finest, playing the estranged father of Gabrielle Union's character. Hudson called it "a very different show", citing the duality of having to protect people as a member of law enforcement while having unresolved relationships that need to be reconciled. Spectrum canceled the series after two seasons the following year.

In August 2019, he confirmed his involvement in Ghostbusters: Afterlife directed by Jason Reitman, joining original cast members Sigourney Weaver, Dan Aykroyd, Bill Murray and Annie Potts. Hudson described himself as being welled by emotions after he put on his jumpsuit and proton pack, as he had previously "accepted that [a film] was never going to happen".

Hudson appeared in the 2022 drama film Prisoner's Daughter, alongside Kate Beckinsale and Brian Cox.

On March 8, 2022, Hudson was announced as the co-lead in NBC's Quantum Leap reboot.

In January 2023, Hudson guest voiced a character, Grini Millegi, a Dowutin gangster who was an associate of Cid and oversees Riot Racing on the planet Safa Toma, on Star Wars: The Bad Batch.

In 2026, he voiced Combat Carl in Toy Story 5 (2026).

== Personal life ==
Hudson married his first wife, Jeannie Moore, in 1963, when she was sixteen and he was eighteen. They had two sons, Ernie Hudson Jr. and Rahaman Hudson. When Hudson and Jeannie divorced in 1976, their sons moved to live with Hudson in California. In 1985, Hudson married former flight attendant Linda Kingsberg, and they had two sons, Andrew and Ross.

On June 8, 2024 (40 years after the original Ghostbusters was released), a portion of South Fair Avenue (M-139) near Hudson's childhood home in Benton Harbor was given the honorary name "Ernie Hudson Way".

== Filmography ==
=== Film ===
Year	Title	Role	Notes	Reference(s)
1976	Leadbelly	Archie		
1976	The Human Tornado	Bo		
1977	Mad Bull	Bart "Black Bart"	Television film	
1978	Last of the Good Guys	El Coliph	Television film	
1979	The Main Event	Killer		
1980	Joni	Earl		
1980	The $5.20 an Hour Dream	Homer Burden	Television film	
1980	White Mama	Counsellor	Television film	
1980	The Octagon	Quinine		
1980	The Jazz Singer	Heckler		
1981	A Matter of Life and Death	Mr. Harrison	Television film	
1981	Underground Aces	African General		
1981	Crazy Times	Harold "Jazzman" Malloy	Television film	
1982	Penitentiary II	"Half Dead"		
1983	Spacehunter: Adventures in the Forbidden Zone	Washington		
1983	Going Berserk	Muhammed Jerome Willy		
1983	Women of San Quentin	Charles Wilson	Television film	
1983	Two of a Kind	Detective Skaggs		
1984	Ghostbusters	Winston Zeddemore		
1984	National Lampoon's Joy of Sex	Mr. Porter		
1985	California Girls	Ernie	Television film	
1985	Love on the Run	Lamar	Television film	
1987	Weeds	Bagdad		
1988	The Dirty Dozen: The Fatal Mission	Joseph Hamilton	Television film	
1988	The Wrong Guys	Dawson		
1989	Leviathan	Justin Jones		
1989	Collision Course	'Shortcut'		
1989	Trapper County War	Jefferson Carter		
1989	Ghostbusters II	Winston Zeddemore		
1992	The Hand That Rocks the Cradle	Solomon		
1993	Angel Street	Thurman Nickens	Television film	
1993	The Pitch	Vet	Short	
1994	Sugar Hill	Lolly Jonas		
1994	The Crow	Sergeant Daryl Albrecht		
1994	No Escape	Hawkins		
1994	The Cowboy Way	Officer Sam "Mad Dog" Shaw		
1994	Airheads	Sergeant O'Malley		
1994	Speechless	Dan Ventura		
1995	The Basketball Diaries	Reggie		
1995	Congo	Captain Monroe Kelly		
1996	The Substitute	Principal Claude Rolle		
1996	Tornado!	Dr. Joe Branson	Television film	
1996	For Which He Stands	DEA Agent Baxter		
1996	Just Your Luck	Willie	Video	
1996	The Cherokee Kid	Nat Love/Deadwood Dick	Television film	
1997	Operation Delta Force	Tipton	Television film	
1997	Levitation	"Downbeat"		
1997	Clover	Gaten Hill	Television film	
1997	Fakin' da Funk	Joe Lee		
1997	Mr. Magoo	CIA Agent Gus Anders		
1997	A Stranger in the Kingdom	Reverend Walter Andrews		
1998	Butter	Curtis "8 Ball" Harris		
1998	Best of the Best 4: Without Warning	Detective Gresko	Video	
1998	Hijack	Senator Douglas Wilson		
1998	October 22	Arthur		
1999	Michael Jordan: An American Hero	James R. Jordan Sr.	Television film	
1999	Shark Attack	Lawrence Rhodes	Television film	
1999	Interceptor Force	Major McKenzie		
1999	Stealth Fighter	President Westwood		
1999	Paper Bullets	Detective Ron Mills		
1999	Miracle on the 17th Green	Earl Fielder	Television film	
1999	Lillie	Larry Miller		
2000	Nowhere to Land	Danny Gorlin	Television film	
2000	Everything's Jake	Jake		
2000	Red Letters	Detective Glen Teal		
2000	The Watcher	FBI Special Agent Mike Ibby		
2000	Miss Congeniality	FBI Assistant Director Harry McDonald		
2001	Walking Shadow	"Hawk"	Television film	
2001	A Town Without Christmas	Ted	Television film	
2003	Anne B. Real	Principal Davis		
2004	Clifford's Really Big Movie	P.T.	Voice	
2005	Marilyn Hotchkiss' Ballroom Dancing and Charm School	Blake Rische		
2005	Lackawanna Blues	Dick Barrymore	Television film	
2005	Miss Congeniality 2: Armed and Fabulous	FBI Assistant Director Harry McDonald		
2005	Bathsheba	Nathan	Short	
2005	Fighting the Odds: The Marilyn Gambrell Story	Perry Beasley	Television film	
2005	Halfway Decent	Tom		
2006	The Ron Clark Story	Principal Turner	Television film	
2006	Hood of Horror	Roscoe		
2007	Certifiably Jonathan	Museum Guard		
2007	Nobel Son	Sergeant Bill Canega		
2007	All Hat	Jackson Jones		
2007	Final Approach	Agent Lorenzo Dawson	Television film	
2008	Pie'n Burger	Cedric	Short	
2008	Lonely Street	Captain Morgan		
2009	Balancing the Books	Detective Carter		
2009	Dragonball Evolution	Sifu Norris		
2009	Pastor Brown	Deacon Harold Todd		
2010	Smokin' Aces 2: Assassins' Ball	FBI Special Agent Anthony Vejar	Video	
2010	Machete Joe	Sheriff Taylor		
2010	Stasis	Stranger	Short	
2010	Game of Death	Catholic Priest		
2011	Beverly Hills Chihuahua 2	Pedro	Video; voice	
2011	Sugarwheels	Prof. Zaccharine Ragus PhD	Short	
2011	Deep Blue Breath	Lord Vater	Short; voice	
2012	Mickey Matson and the Copperhead Conspiracy	Ivan Stumpwater		
2012	Dinner Date	Man	Short	
2012	Beverly Hills Chihuahua 3: Viva La Fiesta!	Pedro	Video; voice	
2012	Deer Crossing	Captain Bailey		
2012	Dark Canyon	Cyrus Parker		
2012	Turning Point	Joe Johnson		
2013	Battledogs	Max Stevens	Television film	
2013	Call Me Crazy: A Five Film	Percy	Television film	
2013	Doonby	Leroy		
2013	Dear Secret Santa	Pastor Avery	Television film	
2013	Reckless	Frank Wolfe	Television film	
2013	Adonis	Chick Magnet CEO	Short	
2014	Touched	Dr. Beck	Television film	
2014	The Grim Sleeper	Detective Claymar		
2014	You're Not You	John		
2014	Merry Ex-Mas	Pastor Ed		
2014	The Last Song	Guest	Short	
2015	To Hell and Back	Joe	Television film	
2015	Gallows Road	Bob Collins		
2015	Delores & Jermaine	Rick	Television film; voice	
2016	The Man in the Silo	Marcus Wells		
2016	Batman: Bad Blood	Lucius Fox	Video; voice	
2016	God's Not Dead 2	Judge Stennis		
2016	Ghostbusters	Uncle Bill Jenkins		
2016	Spaceman	Joe		
2016	Infinity Train	Atticus	Short; voice	
2016	Heaven Sent	Donatello	Television film	
2017	High & Outside: A Baseball Noir	Sanzone		
2018	Nappily Ever After	Richard Jones		
2020	I Love You... Forever	George Henry	Short	
2021	Redemption Day	Ed Paxton		
2021	Ghostbusters: Afterlife	Winston Zeddemore		
2021	Beebo Saves Christmas	Santa Claus	Voice	
2022	Prisoner's Daughter	Hank		
2023	Champions	Coach Phil Peretti		
2023	The Retirement Plan	Joseph		
2024	Ghostbusters: Frozen Empire	Winston Zeddemore		
2026	Toy Story 5	Combat Carl	Voice; replacing Carl Weathers	
TBA	Oswald: Down the Rabbit Hole †	Oswald the Lucky Rabbit		
TBA	Hal †	TBA		

=== Television ===
Year	Title	Role	Notes	Reference(s)
1977	Man from Atlantis	Minion	Episode: "The Disappearances"	
1978	King	Jack Corbin	Main Cast	
1978	Fantasy Island	Jamu	Episode: "Family Reunion/VooDoo"	
1978	Winners	Ted	Episode: "Journey Together"	
1978	Baa Baa Black Sheep	George "King George"	Episode: "A Little Bit of England"	
1979	The Incredible Hulk	Lee	Episode: "Like a Brother"	
1979	Roots: The Next Generations	Muslim at Door	Episode: "Part VII (1960-1967)"	
1979	The White Shadow	Johnson	Episode: "Little Orphan Abner"	
1979	Detective School	Bombacaa	Episode: "Nick Is Smitten"	
1979	One Day at a Time	Desk Sergeant	Episode: "A Little Larceny"	
1979	Highcliffe Manor	Smythe	Main Cast	
1980	Skag	—N/a	Episode: "Pilot"	
1980	Too Close for Comfort	Sam Morton	Episode: "The Bag Lady"	
1981	Diff'rent Strokes	Kwame	Episode: "Almost American"	
1981	Little House on the Prairie	William Thomas	Episode: "Chicago"	
1981	Bosom Buddies	Rochelle	Episode: "One for You, One for Me"	
1981	Taxi	Terry Carver	Episode: "Of Mice and Tony"	
1982	The Dukes of Hazzard	Avery	Episode: "Dear Diary"	
1982	Flamingo Road	Chandler	Recurring cast (Season 2); 4 episodes	
1982	The New Odd Couple	Moses Brown	Episode: "That Was No Lady"	
1983	Webster	Rudy	Episode: "Happy Un-Birthday"	
1983	The A-Team	Cal Freeman	Episode: "The Taxicab Wars"	
1984	St. Elsewhere	Jerry Close	Recurring cast (Season 3); 6 episodes	
1985	The Super Powers Team: Galactic Guardians	Victor Stone/Cyborg	Main cast (Season 9); 8 episodes; voice	
1986	The Last Precinct	Sergeant "Night Train" Lane	Main cast; 8 episodes	
1986	It's a Living	Dougie	Episode: "The Bar"	
1986	Mickey Spillane's Mike Hammer	Digger Love	Episode: "Harlem Nocturne"	
1987	Gimme a Break!	Prince	Episode: "Someday My Prince..."	
1987	Full House	Reggie 'The Sandman' Martin	Episode: "Knock Yourself Out"	
1987	Pound Puppies	Additional Voices	Recurring cast (Season 2); 3 episodes	
1989	The Super Mario Bros. Super Show!	Himself	Episode: "Slime Busters"	
1990	An Evening at the Improv	Himself/Host	Episode: "Episode #5.4"	
1990	Cop Rock	Commander Warren Osborne	Episode: "Pilot"	
1990–1991	Broken Badges	Toby Baker	Main Cast; 7 episodes	
1992	Angel Street	Thurman Nickens	Episode: "Pilot - Part 1 & 2"	
1992	The Ben Stiller Show	Tennis Captain	Episode: "With Bobcat Goldthwait"	
1992	Batman: The Animated Series	Security Guard	Episode: "Joker's Wild"; voice	
1993	TriBeCa	Howard	Episode: "Heros Exoletus"	
1993	Wild Palms	Tommy Lazlo	Main Cast; 5 episodes	
1993	Tales from the Crypt	Zambini	Episode: "Food for Thought"	
1994	Lifestories: Families in Crisis	Coach Seldon	Episode: "A Body to Die For: The Aaron Henry Story"	
1997	Superman: The Animated Series	Professor Felix	Episode: "Action Figures"; voice	
1997–2003	Oz	Warden Leo Glynn	Main Cast; 55 episodes	
1998	The Gregory Hines Show	Jack	Episode: "Carpe Diem"	
1998	Arli$$	Warden Leo Glynn	Episode: "Fans First"	
2000	Intimate Portrait	Himself	Episode: "Robin Givens"	
2001	Touched by an Angel	Norm McCloud	Episode: "The Perfect Game"	
2003	Without a Trace	Manny Aybar	Episode: "Kam Li"	
2003–2004	10-8: Officers on Duty	Senior Deputy John Henry Barnes	Main Cast; 15 episodes	
2004	Everwood	Bill Hoover	Episode: "The Birds and the Batteries"	
2006	Celebrity Paranormal Project	Himself	Episode: "Wooden Lucy"	
2006	Crossing Jordan	Colonel Wirth	Episode: "Code of Ethics"	
2006	Stargate SG-1	Commander Goran Pernaux	Episode: "Ethon"	
2006	ER	Colonel James Gallant	Recurring cast (Season 12); 2 episodes	
2006–2007	Desperate Housewives	Detective Ridley	Recurring cast (Season 3); 7 episodes	
2007	Cold Case	Moses Jones	Episode: "8:03 AM"	
2007	Las Vegas	Bob Casey	2 episodes	
2007	Psych	William Guster	Episode: "Gus's Dad May Have Killed an Old Guy"	
2007–2008	Bones	David Barron	Guest Cast (Season 2–3); 2 episodes	
2008	Private Practice	Captain Frank	Episode: "Nothing to Talk About"	
2008–2013	The Secret Life of the American Teenager	Dr. Ken Fields	Recurring cast; 18 episodes	
2009	Whatever Happened To?	Himself	Episode: "Masters of the Unknown"	
2009	Celebrity Ghost Stories	Himself	Episode: "Anson Williams / Ali Landry / Gina Gershon / Kelly Carlson / Ernie Hudson"	
2009	Meteor	General Brasser	Main Cast; 2 episodes	
2009	Heroes	Captain Lubbock	Recurring cast (Season 4); 2 episodes	
2009–2010	Law & Order	Frank Gibson	Recurring cast (Season 20); 7 episodes	
2010	Childrens Hospital	Hubert McGraw	Episode: "Joke Overload"	
2010	Criminal Minds	Lieutenant Al Garner	Episode: "Devil's Night"	
2010–2013	Transformers: Prime	Special Agent Bill Fowler	Recurring cast; 37 episodes; voice	
2011	White Collar	Mr. Jeffries	Episode: "Dentist of Detroit"	
2011	Torchwood	Stewart Owens	Episode: "Miracle Day: The Middle Men"	
2011	Grey's Anatomy	Brad McDougall	Episode: "Put Me In, Coach"	
2011	How I Met Your Mother	Himself	Episode: "The Rebound Girl"	
2011–2014	Rizzoli & Isles	Admiral Frost	Guest Cast (Season 2 & 5); 2 episodes	
2012	Unsung	Himself	Episode: "Ray Parker Jr."	
2012	Hart of Dixie	Ernie Hayes	Episode: "Snowflakes & Soulmates"	
2012	Nosferajew	CDC Director	Episode: "Community Blech"	
2012–2014	Franklin & Bash	Honorable Lawrence Perry	Recurring cast (Season 2 & 4); 4 episodes	
2012–2016	Modern Family	Miles	Guest Cast (Season 3–4 & 7–8); 4 episodes	
2013	Guys with Kids	The Judge	Episode: "Marny's Dad"	
2013	Last Resort	Conrad Buell	Recurring cast; 2 episodes	
2013	Dan Vs.	Counselor	Episode: "Summer Camp"	
2013	Let's Stay Together	Anthony	Episode: "Troy Story"	
2013	Scandal	Commander Randolph Boles	Episode: "Mrs. Smith Goes to Washington"	
2013	Ironside	Bludso	Episode: "Uptown Murders"	
2013	Dads	Detective Swan	Episode: "Comic Book Issues"	
2013	Mob City	Bunny	Recurring cast; 2 episodes	
2014	Comic Book Men	Himself	Episode: "Stashbusters"	
2014	The Millers	Walter	Episode: "Dear Diary"	
2014	The Haunted Hathaways	Duke Preston	Episode: "Haunted Visitor"	
2014	The Lottery	-	Episode: "Sleep Deprived"	
2014	Scorpion	Brooks	Episode: "Pilot"	
2014	Key & Peele	Dad	Episode: "Terrorist Meeting"	
2014	Hot in Cleveland	Himself	Episode: "Cold in Cleveland: The Christmas Episode"	
2015	Once Upon a Time	King Poseidon	Episode: "Poor Unfortunate Soul"	
2015–2020	Grace and Frankie	Jacob	Recurring cast (Season 1-4 & 6); 17 episodes	
2016	Celebrity Family Feud	Himself	Episode: "Kellie Pickler vs. Lance Bass/Ernie Hudson vs. NeNe Leakes"	
2016	Unsung Hollywood	Himself	Episode: "Rudy Ray Moore"	
2016	Robot Chicken	Various Roles	Episode: "Blackout Window Heatstroke"; voice	
2016	Graves	Jacob Mann	Recurring cast (Season 1); 9 episodes	
2017	APB	Sergeant Ned Conrad	Main Cast; 12 episodes	
2017	Angie Tribeca	Pete Tribeca	Episode: "Germs on Endearment"	
2017	Twin Peaks	Colonel Davis	2 episodes	
2017	Survivor's Remorse	Ansell Jones	Episode: "Reparations"	
2017	Spider-Man	Robbie Robertson	Episode: "Screwball Live"; voice	
2018	Lethal Weapon	Agent Peterson	Episode: "Funny Money"	
2018	Blue Bloods	Principal Darryl Ward	Episode: "School of Hard Knocks"	
2018	Ballers	Mr. Hagerty	Episode: "This Is Not Our World"	
2018–present	The Family Business	L.C. Duncan	Main Cast; 62 episodes	
2019	Hot Streets	John Wayne "Jet Wayne" Junior	Main Cast (Season 2); 8 episodes; voice	
2019	Arrow	General Roy Stewart	Episode: "Spartan"	
2019	Infinity Train	Atticus	Main cast (season 1); 7 episodes; voice	
2019	The Movies That Made Us	Himself	Episode: "Ghostbusters"	
2019–2020	Puppy Dog Pals	Buddy	Guest: Season 2, recurring cast: Season 2; 3 episodes; voice	
2019–2020	L.A.'s Finest	Joseph Vaughn	Main cast; 22 episodes	
2020	Reunited Apart	Himself	Episode: "Who You Gonna Call?"	
2020	The Irate Gamer	Himself	Episode: "Ghostbusters"	
2020	Home Movie: The Princess Bride	Prince Humperdinck	Episode: "Chapter Eight: Ultimate Suffering"	
2021	MacGyver	Milton Bozer	Episode: "H2O + Orthophosphates + Mission City + Corrosion + Origins"	
2022	City on a Hill	Franklin Ward	Recurring cast (Season 3); 2 episodes	
2022–2024	Quantum Leap	Herbert "Magic" Williams	Main cast; 29 episodes	
2023	Star Wars: The Bad Batch	Grini Millegi	Episode: "Faster"; voice	
2024	Firebuds	Chase Thundershock	Episode: "Full-Time Flash/Bubba Trouble"; voice	
2024	Angry Birds Mystery Island	Marlon	Voice	
2025	The Masked Singer	Himself	Episode: "Ghostbusters Night"	
2025–present	Boston Blue	Reverend Edwin Peters	19 episodes	

=== Documentary ===
Year	Title	Reference(s)
2019	Cleanin' Up the Town: Remembering Ghostbusters	

=== Video games ===
Year	Title	Voice role	Notes	Reference(s)
2009	Ghostbusters: The Video Game	Winston Zeddemore		
2015	Lego Dimensions	Winston Zeddemore		
2016	Ghostbusters Pinball	Winston Zeddemore		
2019	NBA 2K20	Israel Bacon		
2019	Ghostbusters: The Video Game Remastered	Winston Zeddemore		
2022	Ghostbusters: Spirits Unleashed	Winston Zeddemore		

=== Music videos ===
Year	Band/Song	Role	Notes	Reference(s)
1984	Ray Parker Jr. – "Ghostbusters"	Winston Zeddemore		
1989	Run-DMC – "Ghostbusters"	Security		

== Awards and nominations ==
Year	Award	Category	Nominated work	Result	Ref.
2024	Saturn Awards	Best Supporting Actor in a Television Series	Quantum Leap	Nominated	
2024	4th Astra TV Awards	Best Supporting Actor in a Broadcast Network or Cable Drama Series	Quantum Leap	Won	
2025	Children's and Family Emmy Awards	Outstanding Single Voice Role Performer	Angry Birds Mystery Island	Nominated	
