= Conan the Adventurer (1997 TV series) =

American television series

- Conan the Adventurer title screen, featuring (left to right, back to front) the characters Zzeben, Conan, Karella, Bayu, and Otli
- Created by: Max A. Keller
- Based on: Conan the Barbarian by Robert E. Howard
- Starring: Ralf Möller; Danny Woodburn; Jeremy Kemp; Robert McRay; T. J. Storm; Aly Dunne
- Composer: Charles Fox
- Country of origin: United States
- No. of seasons: 1
- No. of episodes: 22

Production
- Running time: 60 minutes
- Production companies: Balenciaga Productions; Keller Entertainment Group

Original release
- Network: Syndication
- Release: September 22, 1997 – May 25, 1998

Conan the Adventurer, or simply Conan, is an American television series. It was produced by Max A. Keller and Micheline Keller from 1997 to 1998 and was loosely based on the fantasy hero Conan the Barbarian.

The show premiered on September 22, 1997, and comprised 22 episodes, filmed mainly in Puerto Vallarta, Jalisco, Mexico. Keller Entertainment Group, the same production company responsible for the series Tarzan: The Epic Adventures and Acapulco H.E.A.T., continues to market and distribute the series worldwide. The role of Conan was played by German actor and bodybuilder Ralf Moeller. The rest of the ensemble cast included Danny Woodburn (Otli), Robert McRay (Zzeben), T. J. Storm (Bayu), Aly Dunne (Karella), and briefly, Andrew Craig (Vulkar).

The script for the pilot was written by Steve Hayes, the head of project development for the series. The storyline deviated from the essence of the Conan character, as well as that of the Conan earlier depicted in the 1980s films and comic book series by Marvel Comics, because this adaptation was less violent and aimed at all age groups.

== Plot ==
An all-powerful sorcerer, Hissah Zuhl (Jeremy Kemp) rules Conan's homeland of Cimmeria with an iron fist through magical arts, trickery, and threats. He is responsible for the death of Conan's parents, and he is recurrent as the always just barely thwarted mastermind enemy.

Conan and an army of warriors rebel and fight to free Cimmeria from the demonic tyrant and his minions. In his travels, Conan battles mythical creatures that roam the land. The hero has been chosen by the gods to fight evil, and he has been informed by Crom that he is destined to be a king.

Conan wants revenge against Hissah Zuhl, that seeks to kill the hero. In all episodes the enemy has a primary role and has a servant skeleton with clairvoyant powers. The sorcerer uses an endless horde of warriors, as well as vassal wizards and princes under Zuhl's control.

== Cast ==
- Ralf Moeller as Conan
- Danny Woodburn as Otli
- Robert McRay as Zzeben
- T. J. Storm as Bayu
- Aly Dunne as Karella
- Andrew Craig as Vulkar
- Jeremy Kemp as Hissah Zul
- Arthur Burghardt as The Skull That Talks

== Episodes ==
No.	Title	Directed by	Written by	Original release date
1–2	"The Heart of the Elephant, Parts 1 & 2"	Gerard Hameline	Dennis Richards & Charles Henry Fabian	September 22, 1997
The wizard Hissah Zul receives a prophesy that Conan will supplant and kill him, so he sends his minions general Goroth and the wizard Yara to raid the village where Conan has fallen in love with the villager Tamira. Conan and Tamira are captured by Yara and separated when Conan provokes a slave revolt with the help of the gladiators Zzeben and Vulkar. Yara's servant Otli joins them and Conan finds a sword in a cave, where he receives a vision from his god Crom. He meets a thief named Karella who tells him more about Yara. Yara offers to free Tamira in exchange for Conan stealing a powerful magical stone for him. Conan finds it guarded by an elephant headed being who sacrifices himself to help kill Yara. Goroth kills Tamira to lure Conan into an ambush; Zzeben, Vulkar, the surviving villagers, Karella, and her band of thieves help defeat the general and Conan kills him. Hissah Zul teleports away with his tower and Otli, Zzeben, and Vulkar join Conan on his journeys.
3	"Lair of the Beastmen"	Gerard Hameline	Dennis Richards & Charles Henry Fabian	October 6, 1997
4	"The Siege of Ahl Sohn-Bar"	Rob Stewart	Teagan Clive & Charles Henry Fabian	October 13, 1997
5	"A Friend in Need"	Frank Wayne	Scott Thomas & Charles Henry Fabian	October 20, 1997
6	"The Ruby Fruit Forest"	Frank Wayne	Harry Ackerman & Charles Henry Fabian	October 27, 1997
7	"The Three Virgins"	Mark Roper	John Bull & Charles Henry Fabian	November 7, 1997
8	"Ransom"	Rob Stewart	Molly Glenmore & Charles Henry Fabian	November 14, 1997
9	"The Curse of Afka"	Frank Wayne	Dennis Richards & Charles Henry Fabian	November 21, 1997
10	"Impostor"	Mark Roper	Reagan Clive & Charles Henry Fabian	November 28, 1997
11	"Amazon Woman"	Mark Roper	Harry Ackerman & Charles Henry Fabian	December 7, 1997
12	"Homecoming"	Rob Stewart	Scott Thomas & Charles Henry Fabian	January 25, 1998
13	"The Taming"	Rob Stewart	Molly Glenmore & Charles Henry Fabian	February 1, 1998
14	"Red Sonja"	Mark Roper	Scott Thomas & Charles Henry Fabian	February 8, 1998
15	"Shadows of Death"	Martin Denning	Dennis Richards & Charles Henry Fabian	February 15, 1998
16	"The Child"	Frank Wayne	Dennis Richards & Charles Henry Fabian	February 22, 1998
17	"The Crystal Arrow"	Mark Roper	Scott Thomas & Charles Henry Fabian	March 1, 1998
18	"The Labyrinth"	Martin Denning	Dennis Richards & Charles Henry Fabian	April 26, 1998
19	"The Cavern"	Rob Stewart	Peter Collins & Charles Henry Fabian	May 3, 1998
20	"Antidote"	Rob Stewart	Peter Collins & Charles Henry Fabian	May 10, 1998
21	"Lethal Wizards"	Rob Stewart	Teagan Clive & Charles Henry Fabian	May 17, 1998
22	"Heir Apparent"	Rob Stewart	Harry Ackerman & Charles Henry Fabian	May 24, 1998

== Home media ==
In September 2004, Image Entertainment released the series on DVD.

== Soundtrack ==
The soundtrack, Conan the Adventurer, was released by Sonic Images US in March 1998 on Audio CD. The score was composed by Charles Fox. The song "In Love And War" with music by Charles Fox and lyrics by Roxanne Seeman was written for the tv series episode "Antidote" and performed by Terry Reid.

Michael Bradford, along with Roxanne Seeman and Charles Fox, produced a record version for the soundtrack. Both versions feature Terry Reid singing and are included on the soundtrack.

=== Track listing ===
All music is composed by Charles Fox.

No.	Title	Writer(s)	Length
1.	"Main Title (Warrior Theme)"		3:58
2.	"The Child"		4:52
3.	"Beastman"		5:10
4.	"Beastmen's Lair"		7:04
5.	"Fight and Escape"		2:02
6.	"A Strange Land"		3:43
7.	"Corella's Theme"		3:27
8.	"In Love and War (TV Version)"	Roxanne Seeman	3:12
9.	"The Magic Wand"		3:00
10.	"Ruby Fruit Forest"		3:00
11.	"Otli Enters the Village"		3:15
12.	"Noble Warrior"		3:30
13.	"Ahi Sohn Bar"		1:50
14.	"The Sword of Atlantis"		2:40
15.	"A Friend Falls"		2:02
16.	"The Emissaries"		6:02
17.	"Conan's Victory"		4:23
18.	"In Love and War (Record Version)" (Performed by Terry Reid)	Roxanne Seeman	4:30
19.	"Main Title (Reprise)"		1:04
Total length:			68:22

== See also ==
- Conan the Adventurer (1992 TV series)
- Conan and the Young Warriors

== Bibliography ==
- Sammon, P. M., Conan the Phenomenon, Dark Horse Books, 2013.
