= Nuttin' Less Nuttin' Mo' =

Studio album by College Boyz
- Released: October 4, 1994
- Recorded: 1994
- Genre: Hip hop
- Length: 60:04
- Label: Virgin/Capitol
- Producer: DJ Ron Ski, College Boyz, Humphrey Riley

College Boyz chronology
Radio Fusion Radio (1992)	Nuttin' Less Nuttin' Mo' (1994)

Nuttin' Less Nuttin' Mo' is the second and final album released by rap group, the College Boyz. It was released on October 4, 1994, by Virgin and Capitol Records. After a successful debut two years prior, this album failed to match the success of Radio Fusion Radio, peaking at No. 80 on the Top R&B/Hip-Hop Albums chart. The only charting single, "Rollin", reached No. 49 on the Hot Rap Singles chart.

The album was rated 3 and a half stars by B.R. Wright for The Grand Rapids Press.

== Track listing ==
1. "Live on Wzack"- 3:42
2. "Moment of Truth (The Southern Version)"- 5:20
3. "Rollin'"- 3:54
4. "On Da' Stroll"- 4:27
5. "Easy"- 4:05
6. "Dyin' Out Here"- 3:44
7. "If I Wuz a Bird"- 4:05
8. "No Sets, No Drama, No Stress"- 4:29
9. "15 Emotions"- 3:34
10. "Conscious Weep"- 4:53
11. "Texas Do"- 5:06
12. "Nuttin' Less, Nuttin' Mo'"- 4:26
13. "Run Dance Hall"- 3:56
14. "Dedication"- 4:23

== Samples ==
- "Live on Wzack"
  - "Dr. Funkenstein" by Parliament
- "Run Dance Hall"
  - "Don't Change Your Love" by Five Stairsteps
- "No Sets, No Drama, No Stress"
  - "Float On" by The Floaters
- "Emotions"
  - "I'm Glad You're Mine" by Al Green

== Charts ==
Chart	Peak position
US Top R&B/Hip Hop Albums (Billboard)	80

=== Singles ===
Single	Chart	Position
Rollin'	US Hot Rap Singles	49
