= T.J. Storm =

American actor

T. J. Storm
- Born: Juan Ricardo Ojeda; Fort Wayne, Indiana
- Occupations: Actor; stuntman; dancer; martial artist
- Years active: 1991–present
- Height: 6 ft 2 in (188 cm)

Juan Ricardo Ojeda, better known as T. J. Storm, is an American actor, stuntman, dancer, and martial artist. He is best known for his role as Bayu in Conan the Adventurer and for his motion capture performances in Tron: Legacy, Captain America: Civil War, Deadpool, and as Godzilla in the Monsterverse franchise.

== Early life ==
Storm was born Juan Ricardo Ojeda, the son of a Puerto Rican mother and African-American father in Fort Wayne, Indiana. He was put up for adoption and raised in Honolulu, Hawaii by a Caucasian mother of Native American descent and Mexican-American father. As a child, his adoptive mother wanted to keep him occupied, so he took up dancing and martial arts as a way to balance himself. He went on to study Arashi-Ryu Karate, Taekwondo, Ninjutsu, Brazilian Jiu-Jitsu, and Northern Shaolin, and mastered forms of hip hop dancing and breakdancing. The surname "Storm" supposedly originated from a nickname and is related to one of the karate styles he trained in.

== Career ==
Storm has starred in several major projects including Conan the Adventurer, Punisher: War Zone, Green Lantern, Avatar, Jack the Giant Slayer, and The Martial Arts Kid. He has also provided voice acting and motion capture for a variety of video games.

== Filmography ==
Film roles
Year	Title	Role	Notes
1991	Breathing Fire	Mickey	
1994	La quebradita	Malo #2	
1995	Dragon Fury	Fullock	
1995	Mortal Kombat	Guest Fighter	Uncredited
1995	Enter the Blood Ring	Fighter	
1997	Once Upon a Time in China and America	Rival Tribe Indian Brave	
1997	Kick of Death	Abdul Sabbah	
1999	Urban Menace	King	Direct-to-video
1999	Corrupt	Cinque	
2000	The Wrecking Crew	Josef	
2000	Guido Takes a Hike	Gangster	Short film
2000	Doomsdayer	Pettigrew Montgomery	
2000	Epoch of Lotus	Officer	
2001	A Month of Sundays	Jamaican Taxi Driver	
2001	The Ultimate Game	Rick	Fight choreographer
2001	The Organization	J.C.	
2001	Big Shots	Repo Man	
2003	Law of the Fist	Jax	Short film
2003	Redemption	Melique	Short film
2004	Miss Cast Away and the Island Girls	Officer Dence	Direct-to-video
2005	Soldier of God	Muslim Champion	
2005	BloodRayne	Strongman/Kagan Vampire Guard #3	
2005	Death to the Supermodels	Ninja	Direct-to-video
2006	Vagabond	Sepuko	
2007	Book of Swords	Tao Sing (voice)	
2007	The Tides	—N/a	Short film, Fight choreographer
2008	Punisher: War Zone	Maginty	
2009	Star Trek	Klingon Agitator	Uncredited
2009	Avatar	Colonel Quaritch's Mech Suit	Uncredited
2010	Tron: Legacy	Various (mo-cap)	Uncredited
2011	Detention	—N/a	Fight choreographer
2011	Green Lantern	Parallax (mo-cap)	Uncredited
2012	Black Cobra	Sizwe Biko	Direct-to-video
2012	Band	—N/a	Short film, Stunt choreographer
2012	Berserk: Golden Age Arc II - The Battle for Doldrey	Boscone (voice)	
2014	Godzilla	Godzilla (mo-cap)	Uncredited
2015	The Martial Arts Kid	Coach Laurent Kaine	
2016	Power Play	Armstrong	Short film
2016	Deadpool	Colossus (mo-cap)	
2016	Kickboxer: Vengeance	Storm	
2016	Captain America: Civil War	Iron Man (mo-cap)	
2016	Taken Over	Judah	
2017	Boone: The Bounty Hunter	Benicio Cardoza	
2017	Artificial Loyalty	Alpha	Also flight coordinator
2018	Bullets Blades and Blood	Will	
2018	Tales of Frankenstein	Mogambo	
2018	The Predator	Predator (mo-cap)	
2019	Godzilla: King of the Monsters	Godzilla (mo-cap)	
2019	Boris and the Bomb	Wallace	
2020	N'Everest	Hiram Thunderclap	Short film
2020	Werewolf Island	Indian Chief Strong Wolf	
2022	Under Wraps 2	Sobek	TV Movie
2023	Knights of the Zodiac	Docractes	

Television roles
Year	Title	Role	Notes
1995–1996	VR Troopers	Doom Master	Recurring
1997–1998	Conan the Adventurer	Bayu	Main
2000	Martial Law	Lenkoff	Episode: "In the Dark"
2006	FBI Guys	—N/a	Short, Stunt coordinator
2009	Kamen Rider: Dragon Knight	The Master	Episode: "Kamen Rider Camo"
2011	The Bold and the Beautiful	Manasa	3 episodes
2015	Banshee	—N/a	Episode: "The Fire Trials", Stunt coordinator
2017	Monster School Animation	Kid Running / Fireman / Police Officers (voice)	Episode: "Welcome to Monster School"
2017	Hot Flash: The Chronicles of Lara Tate Menopausal Superhero	Jitsu	Episode: "Training Day"
2017	Lastman	Cooper (voice)	4 episodes
2018	Critical Role	Lucius Lorelei	Episode: "The Song of the Lorelei"

Video Game Roles
Year	Videogame	Role	Notes	Source
2006	Dead Rising	Brad Garrison	Mo-cap	
2008	Devil May Cry 4	Agnus		
2009	Resident Evil 5	Josh Stone	Mo-cap	
2010	Tom Clancy's Splinter Cell: Conviction	Additional Voices		
2011	Resident Evil: The Mercenaries 3D	Additional Voices		
2011	Ultimate Marvel vs. Capcom 3	Strider Hiryu		
2012	UFC Undisputed 3	Quinton Rampage Jackson		
2012	Street Fighter X Tekken	Craig Marduk		
2012	Soulcalibur V	Edge Master		
2012	Resident Evil 6	—N/a	Mo-cap	
2013	Tomb Raider	—N/a	Mo-cap	
2013	Dead Space 3	Additional Voices		
2013	Army of Two: The Devil's Cartel	Mason		
2013	Lightning Returns: Final Fantasy XIII	Additional Voices		
2015	The Order: 1886	—N/a	Mo-cap	
2015	Evolve	—N/a	Mo-cap	
2015	Code Name: S.T.E.A.M.	Queequeg		
2015	Battlefield Hardline	Remy Neltz		
2016	Street Fighter V	Birdie / Shadaloo Soldier		
2017	Marvel vs. Capcom: Infinite	Strider Hiryu		
2017	Knack II	Knack	Mo-cap	
2017	Halo Wars 2: Awakening the Nightmare	Pavium		
2019	Daemon X Machina	Painkiller		
2020	Legends of Runeterra	Lucian		
2020	The Last of Us: Part II	Additional Voices		
2024	Teppen	Strider Hiryu		
