= Butter (1998 film) =

1998 action film

- Directed by: Peter Gathings Bunche
- Written by: Peter Gathings Bunche
- Produced by: Paul Hertzberg; Julian Fowles
- Starring: Ernie Hudson; Nia Long; Donnie Wahlberg; Tony Todd
- Cinematography: Nancy Schreiber
- Edited by: Daniel Duncan
- Music by: Joseph Stanley Williams
- Production companies: CineTel Pictures; Butter Films; World International Network (WIN)
- Distributed by: HBO Films; Artisan Entertainment
- Release date: 1998
- Running time: 101 minutes
- Country: United States
- Language: English

Butter (known as Never 2 Big in the United States) is a 1998 action-thriller film starring Ernie Hudson, Nia Long, Tony Todd and Donnie Wahlberg. It originally premiered on HBO as an HBO Original Film. It was later released to video by Artisan Entertainment as Never 2 Big in 1998 and on DVD in 2001.

== Plot ==
Several corrupt record company executives kill a singing sensation with a lethal injection rather than letting her leave their label and join another company. They then frame her foster brother for the murder forcing him to go on the run and to try to get the goods on the real killers.

== Cast ==
- Shemar Moore as Frederick "Freddy" Roland
- Ernie Hudson as Curtis "8-Ball" Harris
- Nia Long as Carmen Jones
- Donnie Wahlberg as Rick Darren
- Tony Todd as Al "Benzo Al"
- Tom "Tiny" Lister as "House"
- Terrence Howard as Dexter Banks
- Donald Faison as Khaleed
- Salli Richardson as Blusette Ford
- Badja Djola as Roscoe
- Sam Phillips as Dina
- Ernie Hudson Jr. as Marcus

== Soundtrack ==
Butter

Soundtrack album by Various artists
- Released: March 31, 1998
- Recorded: 1997–1998
- Genres: Hip hop, R&B
- Label: Relativity
- Producers: Kay Gee, DJ Paul, Juicy J, The Beatnuts, E-A-Ski, CMT

The soundtrack to the film was released on March 31, 1998, through Relativity Records and consisted of hip hop and R&B music.

=== Track listing ===
1. "Work"- 3:21 (Naughty by Nature, Mag & Castro)
2. "Butta"- 3:48 (E-A-Ski)
3. "Smiling Faces Sometimes"- 4:47 (The Undisputed Truth)
4. "Triple Six Klubhouse"- 2:44 (Lord Infamous)
5. "M.O.B."- 4:06 (Hussein Fatal)
6. "Broken Down"- 4:27 (Vincent Brantley)
7. "No Ways Tired"- 4:54 (Nancey Jackson)
8. "Pain"- 6:14 (Ohio Players)
9. "Big Boy"- 3:31 (Indo G)
10. "Sorry But It's Over Now"- 4:23 (Michelle Mitchell)
11. "Hit 'Em"- 3:53 (Three 6 Mafia)
12. "Off the Books"- 3:03 (The Beatnuts, Cuban Link & Big Punisher)
13. "Superhero"- 4:22 (Christopher Williams)
