= Treacherous =

Treacherous may refer to:

== Film ==
- Treacherous (film), a 1950 Mexican drama
- Treacherous, a 1993 film starring Tia Carrere and Adam Baldwin
- The Treacherous, a 2015 Korean period drama

== Music ==
- "Treacherous" (song), by Taylor Swift, 2012
- "Treacherous", a song by Lil Durk from Signed to the Streets 3, 2018
- "Treacherous", a song by Schoolly D from Smoke Some Kill, 1988

== See also ==
- Alvin the Treacherous, a villain in the How to Train Your Dragon novel series
