= Cheryl Wheeler-Dixon =

American stunt woman (1960–2020)

- Born: Cheryl Marie Wheeler; August 18, 1960; Pensacola, Florida, U.S.
- Died: February 12, 2020 (aged 59); Yellow Springs, Ohio, U.S.
- Occupations: Stuntwoman; martial artist; nutritionist
- Years active: 1984–2020
- Spouse: Shane Dixon (died 1999) Robert "Lindsey" Duncan (m. 1999; div. 2009) Robert "Reed" Sanders (died 2020)
- Children: 2

Cheryl Marie Wheeler-Dixon (August 18, 1960 – February 12, 2020) was an American stunt woman, stunt double, and stunt driver in the US movie industry. She was credited as Cheryl Wheeler-Duncan, Cheryl Wheeler, Cheryl M. Wheeler, and Sheryl Wheeler. She was stunt double for Rene Russo, Kathleen Turner, and Goldie Hawn, among others. She had two daughters, and with her husband, Lindsey Duncan, owned Genesis Today, Inc., a nutritional supplement company in Austin, Texas, and a multilevel marketing offshoot called Genesis Pure.

She and her husband, Robert Reed Sanders, were shot and killed by her ex-husband, Lindsey Duncan, during what authorities ruled a justifiable homicide at Duncan's home in Yellow Springs, Ohio, on February 12, 2020.

== Early years ==
Cheryl Wheeler began studying Yoshukai Karate at fifteen years of age in Pensacola, Florida, with instructor Gerry Blanck. She began kickboxing when her instructor began training an amateur team, but her championship matches were considered professional, as she was paid for the work. Wheeler-Dixon also studied Judo, Aikido, and grappling and trained for a while with kickboxer and actor Don Wilson. She was a three-time WKA World Kickboxing Champion with a record of 17-1-1 and a 2nd degree black belt in Yoshukai Karate.

== Career ==
Wheeler-Dixon began work in the film industry in 1987 and maintained an extensive filmography of stunt work in such films as Back to the Future Part II, Bird on a Wire, Die Hard 2, Lethal Weapon 3 and sequel Lethal Weapon 4, Demolition Man, The Thomas Crown Affair and Charlie's Angels. She provided martial arts training to Rene Russo for the Lethal Weapon film series. Wheeler-Duncan was inducted into Black Belt Magazine's Hall of Fame as 1996 Woman of the Year. With Chris Casamassa, she appeared on the cover and in a feature article in Black Belt Magazine in July 1997. Wheeler-Dixon received a Stunt Award for "Best Stunt Sequence" in the 2000 film Charlie's Angels.

Wheeler-Dixon was injured during the filming of Back to the Future II when she shattered her face and right wrist in a fall and required reconstructive surgery. In April 2010, she was featured on the cover and wrote an article for Healthy Living Magazine. She also worked as a "stuntnastics" instructor and stunt performer at The Stunt Ranch in Austin, Texas.

In 2016, Cheryl's ex-husband, Robert "Lindsey" Duncan, filed a lawsuit against Sanders and her third husband Robert "Reed" Sanders, alleging breach of contract, defamation, breach of fiduciary duty, and theft, and requested "monetary relief over $200,000 but not more than $1,000,000." Ultimately a jury unanimously voted in favor of the Duncans over the Sanderses (posthumously for the Sanderses), with an $11.85 million award from the Sanders' estates, one of the largest mental-anguish damages ever awarded in Texas without a physical injury claim as part of the case (the Sanders' ambush and shootout of the Duncans in Ohio were not part of the case, which had been filed years prior to that event).

== Death ==
Cheryl Wheeler-Sanders (Dixon) and her husband Robert Reed Sanders were both killed in what has been described as an "ambush" and "shootout" with her ex-husband Robert Lindsey Duncan on his property in Yellow Springs, Ohio. Cheryl and her husband had driven from their home in Leicester, North Carolina. Adrian King, a friend and former business partner of Reed Sanders who officiated the couple's wedding, told reporters they had come to confront Mr. Duncan over a college fund for the Duncans' daughters. According to the Greene County, Ohio, sheriff, the Sanderses set up wireless video cameras on a tree stump across the street from Duncan's property to monitor the activity there. Investigators later reported finding a handwritten checklist in the Sanderses' vehicle titled "Be prepared prior to leaving for Y.S." detailing their intentions, along with counterfeit Ohio temporary tags on the vehicle and multiple forms of identification carried by Reed Sanders. Approximately five years before the shooting, Lindsey Duncan had reported to the Greene County Sheriff's Office that he believed Cheryl Sanders was attempting to hire someone to kill him.

On the morning of February 12, 2020, as Mr. Duncan and his wife Molly were pulling into their driveway, they were confronted by Mr. Sanders, who approached the vehicle and pointed a gun at Mrs. Duncan, before turning the weapon on Mr. Duncan. Mr. Duncan, licensed to carry a concealed weapon, shot and killed Mr. Sanders. Cheryl Sanders, who was monitoring the live stream of the events on her cell phone from the wireless cameras, then pulled up to the driveway in her vehicle and pointed her weapon toward Mrs. Duncan. Mr. Duncan shot Mrs. Sanders, killing her. No charges were filed, as the case was determined to be "justifiable homicide".

== Kickboxing record (incomplete) ==
Date	Result	Opponent	Event	Location	Method	Round	Time	Record
1984-11-10	Win	Carol Lemos	World Kickboxing Championships	Reno, Nevada	TKO (referee stoppage)	1	N/A	
For the WKA World Super Bantamweight (-55.5kg/122.1lb) Championship. Lemos substituted for Arlene Weeber.
Legend Win Loss Draw/No contest
