= Lorraine Ziff =

American actress

Lorraine Ziff (born in Bronx, New York) is an American actress. She received a Bachelor of Arts double degree in theater and communications from Marymount College, Tarrytown and her master's degree in social work from Fordham. As an actress, she stars alongside Robert Picardo and Gary Busey in the horror film Mansion of Blood. She also appears in the thriller film Treachery with Michael Biehn and co-stars in the supernatural Western film Six Gun Savior with Eric Roberts.

She is married to insurance broker Laurence F. Ziff and is the mother of the actor and model Matthew Ziff. She and her husband, who has previously served as a trustee of the Garden State Cancer Center, are philanthropically active in raising money for cancer research. Ziff is also a licensed psychotherapist, a skill which she has indicated can come in handy on the set.
