= Matthew Ziff =

American actor and producer (born 1991)

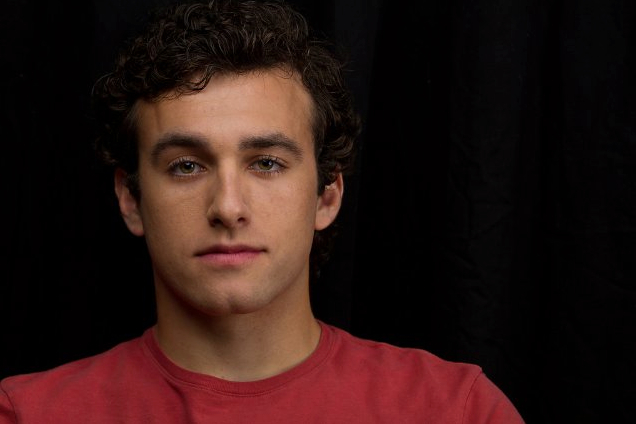
- Born: March 24, 1991 (age 35); Englewood, New Jersey, United States
- Education: University of Miami
- Occupations: Actor, producer
- Years active: 1991–2017

Matthew Ziff (born March 24, 1991) is an American actor and producer.

== Early life ==
Ziff was born in Englewood, New Jersey, the son of philanthropist and insurance broker, Laurence F. Ziff and actress and real estate investor, Lorraine Ziff. He attended the Blair Academy.

== Acting and producing career ==
Ziff's professional career began a few months after his birth, signing with Wilhelmina Modeling Agency at 2 months old. His first TV appearance was on The David Letterman Show. As a child model, he featured in numerous print ads, campaigns, and TV commercials. At the age of eight, Ziff was a guest star on Late Night with Conan O’Brien in a skit called "Late Night with Matthew Ziff." He appeared in Mansion of Blood alongside Robert Picardo and Gary Busey. Ziff is also the executive producer of "Six Gun Savior" and a co-producer of "Mansion of Blood". In the 2016, Ziff appeared in the Kickboxer reboot.

Riff has no credited roles since 2017.

== Personal life ==
He played quidditch in the 2012 International Quidditch Association Global Games for Team USA where they won gold. He played and coached quidditch at the University of Miami for five years as a "beater" while attending.

Ziff graduated in May 2014 with a bachelor's and master's in industrial engineering. His thesis research on the lumbar spine, A Novel Approach for Predicting In-Vivo Lumbar Spine Loads and Kinematics Based on Motion Analysis, was presented at the 7th World Biomechanics Congress in Boston in July 2014. Because of his engineering background, he was featured in Exxon Mobil's TV Spot "Be An Engineer".

In 2020, Ziff received a Master of Science in Biomedical Engineering from City College of New York. As of 2025, Ziff is the Director of Makerspace at Belmont Hill School.

== Filmography ==
Film
Year	Film	Role	Notes
1991	Late Show with David Letterman	Himself	TV series
2000	Late Show with Conan O'Brien	Himself	TV series
2002	Four Deadly Reasons	Little Billy	Movie
2003	Little Kings	Young Gino	Movie
2005	Searching for Bobby D	Neighborhood Kid No. 1	Movie
2009	Lynch Mob	Tony	Movie
2011–2014	Actors Entertainment	Himself	TV series
2012	Hardflip	Jerry	Movie
2013	Daytime	Himself – Episode dated 30 April 2013	TV series
2013	Among Friends	Actor Adam	Movie
2013	The Apex Project	Bryce (executive producer)	Movie
2013	Treachery	Nathan	Movie
2013	Actors Day in LA	Himself – set of "Six Gun Savior"	Movie
2014	Safelight	Kyle	Movie
2014	Altered Perception (post-production)	Justin	Movie
2014	Six Gun Savior	Kyle "Hawk" Hawkins (executive producer) / (producer)/ (stunt performer) / (stunts)	Movie
2014	Mansion of Blood	Martin Corbett (co-producer)	Movie
2014	The Martial Arts Kid	Bo Whitlaw	Movie
2014	Never a Neverland	Co-producer	Movie
2015	Union Bound	William Owens	Movie
2015	Teens Wanna Know	Himself-Guest	TV series
2015	Paid in Full	Carter	Movie
2015	Online Abduction	Jeremy	Movie
2016	Kickboxer: Vengeance	Bronco	Movie
2016	Trafficked (post-production)	Jake	Movie
2016	The Dark Return of Time (pre-production)	Flavian Bennett	Movie
2016	Heartbeat	Drew	Movie
2016	My Thai Life	Bryan Clarke (1 episode)	TV series
2017	Taken Heart	Drew	Movie
2017	TMI Hollywood	Himself (host) (1 episode)	
2017	Altered Perception	Justin	Movie
2017	Real Rob	Box Office Fred (1 episode)	TV series
2017	Trafficked	Jake	TV series
2017	The Jade Pendant	Officer Matt	Movie
2017	Another Castle	Caleb	TV series

== Awards ==
- Sunscreen Film Festival – Best Up & Coming Actor for Treachery (2013)
- Hoboken International Film Festival – Best Actor for Treachery (2014)
- Action Martial Arts Magazine Hall of Honors 2015 – Rising Star Award (2015)
- Action Martial Arts Magazine Hall of Honors 2015 – Outstanding Achievements in the Martial Arts (2015)
- Sunscreen Film Festival – Best Supporting Actor for The Martial Arts Kid (2015)
