= Corrupt (1999 film) =

1999 film directed by Albert Pyun

- Directed by: Albert Pyun
- Written by: Hannah Blue; Andrew Markell
- Starring: Ice-T; Silkk the Shocker
- Cinematography: Philip Alan Waters
- Edited by: Errin Vasquez
- Music by: Ice-T; Anthony Riparetti
- Release date: 1999
- Country: United States
- Language: English

Corrupt is a 1999 American crime drama film starring Ice-T and Silkk the Shocker.

== Plot ==
After decades of street violence, two gangs have finally made a truce. MJ (Silkk The Shocker) has finally found a way to get out of the deadly neighborhood him and his sister Jodi are living in. Corrupt (Ice-T) is the only person standing in MJ's way of leaving and this results in a war between two gangs.

== Cast ==
- Ice-T as Corrupt
- Silkk the Shocker as M.J.
- Miss Jones as Margo
- Ernie Hudson Jr. as Miles
- Karen Dyer as Jodi
- T. J. Storm as Cinque
- Tahitia Hicks as Lisa (as Tahitia)
- Taylor Scott as Pammi
- Jahi J.J. Zuri as Yazu
- Romany Malco as Snackbar Man

== Production ==
Director Pyun shot Corrupt simultaneously with The Wrecking Crew and Urban Menace in a derelict factory in Eastern Europe, originally intending Urban Menace and The Wrecking Crew as sections of a single film; the producers decided to make two films.

== Reaction ==
Corrupt was received poorly. Ice-T bashed the film on the commentary. The film received low ratings and received two rotten reviews on Rotten Tomatoes.
