= Treachery (film) =

- Poster
- Directed by: Travis Romero
- Written by: Travis Romero
- Produced by: Ryan Azevedo; Rebecca Torrellas
- Starring: Michael Biehn
- Cinematography: Eric Curtis
- Edited by: Vance Crofoot
- Music by: Randy Chance
- Release date: April 20, 2013 (Sunscreen Film Festival)
- Running time: 67 minutes
- Country: United States
- Language: English

Treachery is a 2013 American thriller film written and directed by Travis Romero and starring Michael Biehn.

== Premise ==
An estranged father and son are re-united at a wedding party. However, a storm traps them in a cabin, leading to worse things to come.

== Cast ==
- Michael Biehn as Henry
- Jennifer Blanc Biehn as Becki
- Caitlin Keats as Vanessa
- Chris Meyer as Evan
- Matthew Ziff as Nathan
- Sarah Butler as Cecilia
- Richard Gunn as Robert
- Lorraine Ziff as Carla Greene Esq.

== Development ==
Most of the cast of the film were announced on May 3, 2012.

Filming began in June 2012 and the first set photo was released on June 14, 2012. Another set photo was revealed by Fangoria. The film is being developed by the company BlancBiehn Productions. The film was partly funded by a campaign on Kickstarter.

Filming occurred mostly in Los Angeles.

The film's producers are Paul Foley, Ryan Azevedo, Denny Kirkwood, Jason Sallee, Kate Rees Davies, Christopher C. Murphy and Andreas Ziebart.

== Critical response ==
The film has been reviewed by several critics. One of the movie's first reviewers, a writer for Allenbe.net, states, "It’s a breath of fresh air in a dark, sadistic and treacherous kind of way".

== Release ==
Origin Releasing set the release of the film for the 4th quarter of 2015.
