= Urban Menace =

1999 film by Albert Pyun

- Theatrical release poster
- Directed by: Albert Pyun
- Written by: Hannah Blue; Andrew Markell; Tim Story
- Produced by: Paul Rosenblum; Tom Karnowski; Mark Allen
- Starring: Snoop Dogg; Big Pun; Ice-T; Fat Joe
- Cinematography: Philip Alan Waters
- Edited by: Errin Vasquez
- Distributed by: Filmwerks; Imperial Entertainment
- Release date: 1999
- Running time: 72 minutes
- Country: United States
- Language: English

Urban Menace is a 1999 American horror film directed by Albert Pyun and starring Snoop Dogg, Big Pun, Ice-T and Fat Joe.

== Plot ==
After a church burning in which a preacher and his family are killed, the preacher's insane ghost (Snoop Dogg) starts killing off the members of the gang responsible.

== Cast ==
- Snoop Dogg as "Preacher" Caleb
- Big Pun as "Crow"
- Ice-T as The Narrator
- Fat Joe as "Terror"
- T. J. Storm as King
- Vincent Klyn as "Shadow"
- Romany Malco as "Syn"
- Tahitia Hicks as Holt (Tahitia)
- Eva La Dare as Jolene (Karen Dyer)
- Ernie Hudson Jr. as "No Dice"
- Jahi J.J. Zuri as "Cool D"
- Rob Ladesich as Harper
- Michael Walde-Berger as Harper's Boss
- Michaela Polakovicova as Hooker
- Ed Satterwhite as Crow's Posse
- Jason Stapleton as Crow's Posse
- Lubo Salater as Crow's Posse
- Robert Ughoro as Caleb's Posse

== Production ==
Director Pyun shot Urban Menace simultaneously with The Wrecking Crew and Corrupt in a derelict factory in Eastern Europe, originally intending Urban Menace and The Wrecking Crew as sections of a single film; the producers decided to make two films. The budget only permitted two stuntmen, making deaths repetitive. Pyun often superimposed the stars' faces onto stand-ins. Half the finished film was lost in transit, requiring substitution of rough duplicate footage; large parts of Urban Menace are in black and white and the photography is often blurry.

== Reception ==
The film was regarded as low-quality; the DVD provides an option of skipping it and simply listening to Ice-T rapping. However, one critic praised the hip-hop and rap soundtrack and crisp sound effects.
