= Everything or Nothing =

Everything or Nothing may refer to:

- "Everything or Nothing" (song), a 2004 song by Mýa
- "Everything or Nothing", a 2018 song by Picture This
- Everything or Nothing, a 2024 album by Inna
- Everything or Nothing, a 2008 album by Lisa Lavie
- Everything or Nothing, a 2012 documentary film about the James Bond films, by Stevan Riley

== See also ==
- James Bond 007: Everything or Nothing, a 2004 third-person shooter video game
- James Bond 007: Everything or Nothing (GBA video game), 2003
