= Big Japan =

American indie rock band

- Also known as: Steven's Team
- Origin: Los Angeles, California, U.S.
- Genres: Indie rock
- Years active: 2005 – present
- Labels: Nightshift
- Members: Nathanial Castro; Adam Brody; Bret Harrison; Brad Babinski

Big Japan is a four-piece indie rock band from Los Angeles, featuring Nathanial Castro on vocals and guitar, Brad Babinski on bass, guitarist Bret Harrison and Adam Brody on drums. The band only perform and record sporadically given Brody and Harrison's unpredictable schedules.

The band's name was originally Steven's Team, named after the movie The Cable Guy.

Big Japan's first release, Music for Dummies, was digitally released through Nightshift Records on August 23, 2005. The album's title was changed from "Music for Dummies" to "Untitled" and the limited number of CDs printed have become collector's items.

== Discography ==
- Music for Dummies, later renamed Untitled (2005, Nightshift Records)
