= Adam Brody =

American actor (born 1979)

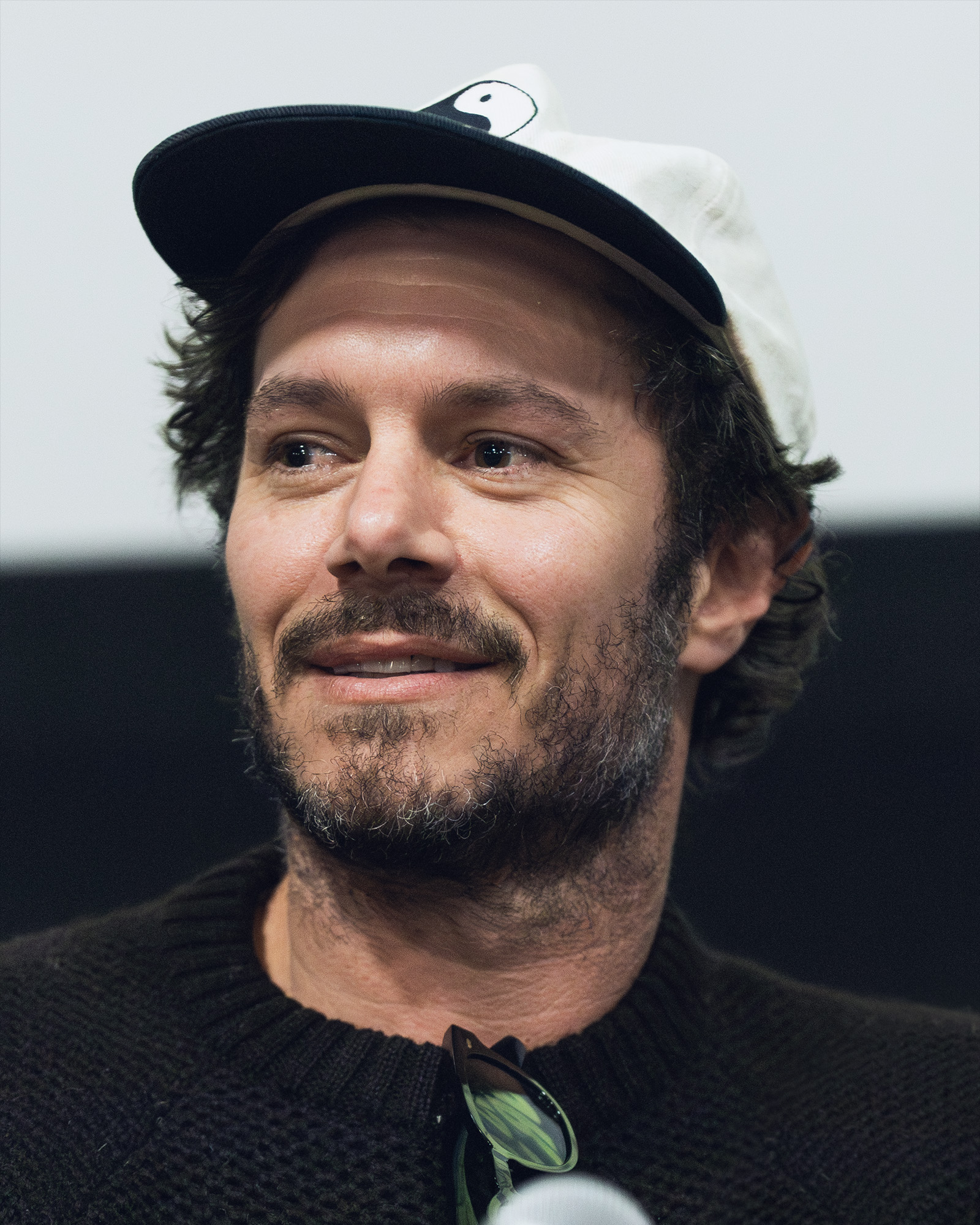
- Brody in 2026
- Born: Adam Jared Brody; December 15, 1979 (age 46); San Diego, California, U.S.
- Occupation: Actor
- Years active: 1999–present
- Spouse: Leighton Meester (m. 2014)
- Children: 2

Adam Jared Brody (born December 15, 1979) is an American actor. His breakout role was as Seth Cohen on the Fox television series The O.C. (2003–2007). For his performance as Noah Roklov in the Netflix romantic comedy series Nobody Wants This (2024–present), he earned nominations for the Golden Globe Award for Best Actor in a Television Series (Musical/Comedy) and the Primetime Emmy Award for Outstanding Lead Actor in a Comedy Series; he won the Critics’ Choice Television Award for Best Actor in a Comedy Series.

Brody has appeared in films including Mr. & Mrs. Smith (2005), Thank You for Smoking (2005), In the Land of Women (2007), and Jennifer's Body (2009). In the 2010s, Brody had supporting roles in comedies including Seeking a Friend for the End of the World (2012) and Sleeping with Other People (2015), and dramatic films such as Lovelace (2013). He appeared in a number of television series during this time, and starred in and produced the television series StartUp (2016–2018).

Brody has also appeared in the DC superhero film Shazam! (2019) and its sequel Shazam! Fury of the Gods (2023), and in the thriller films Ready or Not (2019) and Promising Young Woman (2020). He also starred in the mystery film The Kid Detective (2020) and the Hulu miniseries Fleishman Is in Trouble (2022).

== Early life ==
Brody was born in San Diego, California, to Valerie Jill (née Siefman), a graphic artist, and Mark Alan Brody, an attorney. He has younger twin brothers, Sean and Matthew (born 1985). His parents, both Jewish, are originally from Detroit. Brody had a bar mitzvah ceremony and grew up celebrating Jewish holidays.

Brody grew up in suburban San Diego, where he attended Wangenheim Middle School and Scripps Ranch High School and received "poor grades". He spent much of his time surfing, admitting that he "pretty much lived at the beach".

Brody attended community college at MiraCosta College for one year, dropping out at the age of 19; he then moved to Hollywood to become an actor.

== Acting career ==
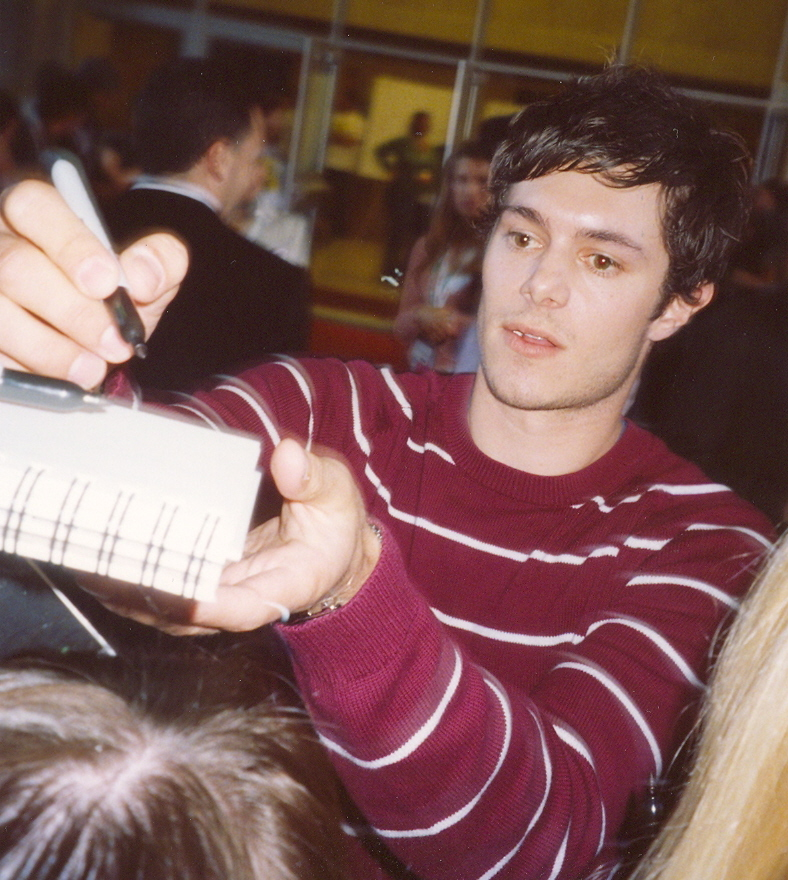
Brody at the 2005 Toronto International Film Festival

After a year of training and auditioning, Brody landed the role of Barry Williams in the television film Growing Up Brady (2000) and appeared in the Canadian comedy series The Sausage Factory. In 2001, he had a minor role in American Pie 2. Brody's first major television role came in 2002, when he was cast in a recurring role on the third season of the comedy-drama series Gilmore Girls as Dave Rygalski, Lane's bandmate and love interest.

In 2003, Brody appeared in the movie Grind and the music video for "Too Bad About Your Girl" by the Donnas. That year, he was cast in his breakout role as Seth Cohen on the teen drama series The O.C., where he reportedly improvised some of the character's comedic dialogue. The role turned him into a teen idol, with the character described by the Los Angeles Times as "TV's sexiest geek" and by Time as having "redefined" the screen persona of "unapologetic" nerdiness. Brody was the first male on the cover of Elle Girl.

In 2005, Brody had a supporting role in the film Mr. & Mrs. Smith, and played a Hollywood studio assistant in the film adaptation of Thank You for Smoking (2006). His next film role was in the romantic comedy In the Land of Women (2007), as a writer who returns to his mother's Michigan hometown to take care of his sick grandmother. He did not have to audition for the part, but was almost unable to appear in the film because of scheduling conflicts with the second season of The O.C.; the film's director pushed filming back eight months because he wanted Brody to star. The O.C. ended its run in 2007 after four seasons. Brody had said that he was "not unhappy" with the show's cancellation, and that although he was "fortunate" to be on a successful series, he was also glad to "not be on it for 10 years".

After the end of The O.C.'s run, Brody turned to a full-time film career. In 2007, he appeared in supporting roles in the films Smiley Face and The Ten. In 2009, he starred in Boaz Yakin's drama Death in Love and in Diablo Cody's horror film Jennifer's Body. In 2010, he appeared in Kevin Smith's film Cop Out, and then in The Romantics. In July 2010, it was announced that he had worked play Deputy Ross Hoss in Scream 4, which was released in April 2011. In 2011, he voiced Woodie in the MTV animated series Good Vibes, and appeared in The Oranges.

In January 2012, it was announced that Brody had joined the cast of Lovelace, a biopic about late 1970s porn star Linda Lovelace, directed by Rob Epstein and Jeffrey Friedman. Brody portrayed Harry Reems. He starred in Some Girl(s), which premiered at the 2013 SXSW Festival. He appeared in Life Partners (2014). In 2015, he appeared in Sleeping with Other People and starred as Billy Jones in Direct TV's sitcom Billy and Billie.

In 2016, Brody starred in Sony Crackle's drama series StartUp. He played the older version of Jack Dylan Grazer's character in the superhero film Shazam! and starred in the thriller Ready or Not, directed by Matt Bettinelli-Olpin and Tyler Gillett for Fox Searchlight. The films were released in April and August 2019, respectively, both to positive reviews. Brody has also appeared as Max Larssen in the eight-part drama Curfew, beginning in February 2019. In 2024, he co-starred in the first season of Netflix's Nobody Wants This as Rabbi Noah Roklov who starts dating Kristen Bell's character, Joanne, a shiksa. His performance earned him a nomination for the Golden Globe Award for Best Actor – Television Series Musical or Comedy and Primetime Emmy Award for Outstanding Lead Actor in a Comedy Series.

== Other works ==
Aside from acting, Brody is credited as a musician and writer; he says that he "writes screenplays and songs during [his] spare time." In 2003, he wrote and produced the short film Home Security.

In 2005, Brody, along with Nathaniel Castro, Bret Harrison, and Brad Babinski, formed the Los Angeles–based rock band Big Japan, with Brody as the drummer. Their first release, Music for Dummies, was digitally released through Nightshift Records on August 23, 2005. The four-piece indie band played gigs at pubs and festivals from 2005 to 2007 such as The Knitting Factory, Bamboozle Left, The Roxy, Spaceland, and The Viper Room.

In 2007, Brody, with Danny Bilson and Paul De Meo, co-wrote a comic-book miniseries for DC's Wildstorm Comics titled Red Menace. The limited series had six issues and was collected into a trade paperback. Since 2010, Brody has played drums in the project band The Shortcoats; they released their first EP, This Time Last Year, on October 4, 2011. Their song "Morning, Shipwreck," which Brody co-wrote, is featured in the sitcom Ben and Kate and the 2015 film The Meddler.

Brody is featured in the BBDO-created "It's Time for WhatsApp" advertising campaign which debuted on September 3, 2025.

== Personal life ==
Brody is a secular Jew and is non-religious. He is a member of the Democratic Party. He has joined voting action campaigns including Swing Left. In September 2026, a GQ interview quoted Brody as saying, "Put me down as wanting a free Palestine"; he also referred to the events in Gaza as a "genocide".

In March 2010, Brody met actress Leighton Meester while filming The Oranges in Westchester, New York. They were engaged in November 2013 and married in a private ceremony on February 15, 2014. Their first child, a daughter, was born in 2015. In 2020, they revealed they were expecting their second child, a son who was born later that year. In January 2025, their home was destroyed by the Palisades Fire.

== Filmography ==
Key
†	Denotes films that have not yet been released

=== Film ===
Year	Title	Role	Notes
1999	Random Acts of Violence	Student	
2001	According to Spencer	Tommy	
2001	American Pie 2	High school guy	Unrated version
2002	The Ring	Male teen #1 / "Kellen"	
2003	Grind	Dustin Knight	
2003	Home Security	Greg	Short film; also writer and producer
2003	Missing Brendan	Patrick Calden	
2005	Mr. & Mrs. Smith	Benjamin Danz	
2005	Thank You for Smoking	Jack Bein	
2007	In the Land of Women	Carter Webb	
2007	Smiley Face	Steve the Dealer	
2007	The Ten	Stephen Montgomery	
2008	Death in Love	Talent agent	
2009	Jennifer's Body	Nikolai Wolf	
2010	Cop Out	Barry Mangold	
2010	The Romantics	Jake	
2011	Damsels in Distress	Charlie Walker	
2011	The Oranges	Toby Walling	
2011	Scream 4	Ross Hoss	
2012	Seeking a Friend for the End of the World	Owen	
2012	Revenge for Jolly!	Danny Fidazzo	
2013	Baggage Claim	Sam	
2013	Lovelace	Harry Reems	
2013	Some Girl(s)	The Man	
2013	Welcome to the Jungle	Chris	
2014	Growing Up and Other Lies	Rocks	
2014	Life Partners	Tim	
2014	Think Like a Man Too	Isaac	
2015	Sleeping with Other People	Sam	
2016	Showing Roots	Bud	
2016	Yoga Hosers	Ichabod	
2017	CHiPs	Clay Allen	
2017	Big Bear	Eric	
2018	Isabelle	Matt Kane	
2019	Jay and Silent Bob Reboot	Chronic-Con Hot Topic salesman	
2019	Shazam!	Freddy Freeman (adult)	
2019	Ready or Not	Daniel Le Domas	
2020	The Kid Detective	Abe Applebaum	
2020	Promising Young Woman	Jerry	
2020	The Last Blockbuster	Himself	
2022	Scream	Partygoer	Voice cameo
2022	My Father's Dragon	Bob	Voice
2023	Shazam! Fury of the Gods	Freddy Freeman (adult)	
2023	River Wild	Trevor	Direct-to-video
2023	American Fiction	Wiley Valdespino	
2024	The Gutter	Building Inspector	
TBA	A Night at Claridge's †		In production

=== Television ===
Year	Title	Role	Notes
1999	The Amanda Show	Greg Brady	Episode: "When Brady's Attack"
2000	City Guys	Customer #1	Episode: "Makin' Up is Hard to Do"
2000	Family Law	Noel Johnson	Episode: "My Brother's Keeper"
2000	Go Fish	Billy	Episode: "Go Student Council"
2000	Growing Up Brady	Barry Williams	TV movie
2000	Judging Amy	Barry Gilmore	Episode: "Romeo and Juliet Must Die – Well, Maybe Just Juliet"
2000	Undressed	Lucas	3 episodes
2000–2001	Once and Again	Coop	3 episodes
2000–2002	The Sausage Factory	Zack Altman	Main cast
2001–2004	Grounded for Life	Brian	2 episodes
2002	Smallville	Justin Gaines	Episode: "Crush"
2002–2003	Gilmore Girls	Dave Rygalski	Recurring role (season 3)
2003–2007	The O.C.	Seth Cohen	Main cast
2004	MADtv	Seth Cohen	Episode 9.22
2006	The Loop	Keith MacDonald	Episode: "The Rusty Trombone"
2011	Good Vibes	Woodie Stone	Main cast; voice role
2013	Burning Love	Max	Main cast (season 2)
2013	House of Lies	Nate Hyatt	3 episodes
2013	Kroll Show	Joel Faizon	Episode: "Ice Dating"
2013	The League	Ted Rappaport	4 episodes
2014	New Girl	Berkley	Episode: "Exes"
2014	The Cosmopolitans	Jimmy	Pilot
2015	Billy and Billie	Billy Jones	Main cast
2016–2018	StartUp	Nick Talman	Main cast; also producer
2018	Urban Myths	Jack Lemmon	Episode: "Marilyn Monroe and Billy Wilder"
2019–2020	Single Parents	Derek	Guest role (season 1); recurring role (season 2)
2019	Curfew	Max Larssen	4 episodes
2020	Mrs. America	Marc Feigen Fasteau	Episode: "Phyllis & Fred & Brenda & Marc"
2022	Fleishman Is in Trouble	Seth Morris	Miniseries; main cast
2024–present	Nobody Wants This	Noah Roklov	Main cast
2025	Good Cop/Bad Cop	Jeremiah Jackson	Episode: "Buckle Up"

== Awards and nominations ==
Year	Award	Category	Nominated work	Result	Ref.
2004	Teen Choice Awards	Choice TV Actor: Drama	The O.C.	Won	
2004	Teen Choice Awards	Choice TV: Breakout Actor	The O.C.	Nominated	
2004	Gold Derby Awards	Drama Supporting Actor	The O.C.	Nominated	
2005	Teen Choice Awards	Choice TV: Chemistry (shared with Rachel Bilson)	The O.C.	Won	
2005	Teen Choice Awards	Choice TV Actor: Drama	The O.C.	Won	
2005	Teen Choice Awards	Choice Male Hottie	Adam Brody	Nominated	
2006	Teen Choice Awards	Choice TV Actor: Drama	The O.C.	Won	
2010	Teen Choice Awards	Choice Movie Actor: Horror/Thriller	Jennifer's Body	Nominated	
2014	Acapulco Black Film Festival	Best Ensemble Cast	Baggage Claim	Nominated	
2018	British Horror Film Festival	Best Actor	Isabelle	Nominated	
2021	Vancouver Film Critics Circle	Best Actor in a Canadian Film	The Kid Detective	Nominated	
2024	Screen Actors Guild Awards	Outstanding Performance by a Cast in a Motion Picture	American Fiction	Nominated	
2025	Golden Globe Awards	Best Actor – Television Series Musical or Comedy	Nobody Wants This	Nominated	
2025	Satellite Awards	Best Actor in a Comedy or Musical Series	Nobody Wants This	Nominated	
2025	Critics' Choice Television Awards	Best Actor in a Comedy Series	Nobody Wants This	Won	
2025	Screen Actors Guild Awards	Outstanding Performance by a Male Actor in a Comedy Series	Nobody Wants This	Nominated	
2025	Primetime Emmy Award	Outstanding Lead Actor in a Comedy Series	Nobody Wants This	Nominated	
2026	Critics' Choice Television Awards	Best Actor in a Comedy Series	Nobody Wants This	Nominated	
2026	Golden Globe Awards	Best Actor – Television Series Musical or Comedy	Nobody Wants This	Nominated	
2026	Actor Awards	Outstanding Performance by a Male Actor in a Comedy Series	Nobody Wants This	Nominated	
