= Paul De Meo =

American screenwriter and producer (1953–2018)

- Born: Paul James De Meo; June 4, 1953
- Died: February 26, 2018 (aged 64); Los Angeles, California, U.S.
- Education: California State University, San Bernardino
- Occupations: Screenwriter; producer
- Known for: The Rocketeer; The Flash; Da 5 Bloods

Paul James De Meo (June 4, 1953 – February 26, 2018) was an American screenwriter and producer for film, television and video games. He frequently worked with Danny Bilson. Together, they wrote Eliminators (1986), The Rocketeer (1991), the video game James Bond 007: Everything or Nothing (2003), the television series Viper (1994, 1996), The Sentinel (1996), and both the television and comic book series of The Flash (1990). Da 5 Bloods (2020), based on a screenplay written by De Meo and Bilson, was released posthumously. He wrote two comics based on the Red Faction series: Armegeddon and Red Faction: Guerrilla: A Fire On Mars produced by Wildstorm Comics.

== Career ==
De Meo graduated from California State University, San Bernardino. There he met and teamed up with long-time writing partner Bilson, and together they formed Pet Fly Productions.

Bilson and DeMeo produced their first script, Trancers (1985), a noir tale about a time-travelling detective from the future. Five sequels were made. After, they did two comedies, Zone Troopers (1985) and The Wrong Guys (1988). Next, they undertook the adaptation of The Rocketeer in 1985. Writing for Disney, the partners were hired and fired several times during the five years of movie development.

Creator Dave Stevens liked that "their ideas for The Rocketeer were heartfelt and affectionate tributes to the 1930s serials with all the right dialogue and atmosphere. Most people would approach my characters contemporarily, but Danny and Paul saw them as pre-war mugs." that same year, the trio approached William Dear to direct/co-write The Rocketeer, and they eventually dropped the low-budget idea. Bilson, De Meo, and Dear kept the comic book's basic plot intact, but fleshed it out to include a Hollywood setting and a climactic battle against a Nazi Zeppelin. They also tweaked Cliff's girlfriend to avoid comparisons to Bettie Page (Stevens' original inspiration), changing her name from Betty to Jenny and her profession from nude model to Hollywood extra (a change also made to make the film more family friendly). The two had a rough executive experience, in which scenes were deleted only to be restored years later. The film finally made it to theaters in 1991, where it underperformed at the box office but developed a cult following.

DeMeo would spend the rest of the 1990s working in television, creating programmes like Human Target, and would transition into video games in the 2000s, working on several James Bond games. He later wrote both the film adaptation and video game sequel to Company of Heroes.

=== The Flash and Red Menace ===
Bilson and De Meo returned to writing comics, co-writing The Flash: The Fastest Man Alive for DC Comics in 2006. They also wrote a mini-series for Wildstorm Comics named Red Menace with actor Adam Brody (who was dating Bilson's daughter Rachel Bilson at the time).

== Death ==
De Meo died on February 26, 2018. Bilson was the first to report it on Twitter. His last screenplay, the Vietnam War drama Da 5 Bloods, directed by Spike Lee, was posthumously released by Netflix in 2020.

Following De Meo's death, Danny Bilson would interview with De Meo's nephew, Rick Glassman, on the podcast Take Your Shoes Off. He discussed De Meo's death, shared personal stories, and talked about the screenplay developed during Paul's illness for Spike Lee's film, Da 5 Bloods.

In 2021, Danny Bilson discussed his career working with De Meo on The Ghost of Hollywood.

== Writing credits ==
Year	Title	Notes
1985	Trancers	
1985	Zone Troopers	
1986	Eliminators	
1987	Kung Fu: The Next Generation	TV series
1988	Pulse Pounders	
1988	The Wrong Guys	
1989	Arena	
1990-1991	The Flash	TV series
1991	The Rocketeer	
1992	Human Target	TV series
1996-1997	The Sentinel	TV series
1996-1999	Viper	TV series
2003	Medal of Honor: Rising Sun	Video game
2003	James Bond 007: Everything or Nothing	Video game
2004	GoldenEye: Rogue Agent	Video game
2011	Red Faction: Origins	Video game
2013	Company of Heroes	
2013	Metro: Last Light	Video game
2013	Company of Heroes 2	Video game
2020	Da 5 Bloods	Posthumous release
2023	The Rocketeer #1 IDW	comic

== Award nominations ==
- The Rocketeer nominated for Best Dramatic Presentation, Hugo Awards 1991.
- Rocketeer Adventure Magazine No. 1 nominated for Best Story or Single Issue,.
