= Red Menace (comics) =

- Cover of the first issue

Publication information
- Publisher: Wildstorm
- Schedule: Monthly
- Format: Mini-series
- Publication date: January 2007 -
- No. of issues: Six
- Main character: Steve Temaine; Tommy Woods

Creative team
- Written by: Danny Bilson, Paul DeMeo and Adam Brody
- Penciller: Jerry Ordway
- Inker: Al Vey
- Colorist: Jonny Rench

Red Menace is a 2007 six-issue American comic book limited series written by Danny Bilson, Paul DeMeo and Adam Brody, illustrated by Jerry Ordway and Jonny Rench, and published by Wildstorm Productions.

The story is set 1953 Los Angeles at the time of Joseph McCarthy and the House Un-American Activities Committee trials.

== Plot summary ==
At one of the House of Un-American Activities Committee trials, a hero named "The Eagle" unmasks himself as World War II veteran Steve Tremaine. The Committee uses his wartime friendship with Ivan "The Bear" Petrovich, a hero to the Soviet Union, to brand him a communist and bans him from being the Eagle. By the next day, every newspaper calls him "Red Menace."

Despite the government's banning of his vigilantism, the Eagle continues to sneak out at night and fight crime. He keeps in touch with his old friend Petrovich as well. Unknowingly, Tremaine leads a group of anti-communist extremists to Petrovich's location after they listen in on a conversation between the two. Petrovich is then brutally murdered by the men. Upon hearing the news, Tremaine is driven to a deep depression that leads him to heavy drinking for a period of more than three weeks. At a scuffle with some men at a bar over Tremaine's alleged communist sympathies, Tremaine is introduced to a young superhero called the Gray Falcon who fights crime, inspired by the Eagle's efforts.

== Collection ==
The limited series has been collected into a trade paperback, Red Menace (144 pages, October 2007, ISBN 978-1-4012-1383-1)
