= The Rocketeer (film) =

1991 film by Joe Johnston

- Theatrical release poster
- Directed by: Joe Johnston
- Screenplay by: Danny Bilson; Paul De Meo
- Story by: Danny Bilson; Paul De Meo; William Dear
- Based on: The Rocketeer by Dave Stevens
- Produced by: Charles Gordon; Lawrence Gordon; Lloyd Levin
- Starring: Billy Campbell; Alan Arkin; Jennifer Connelly; Paul Sorvino; Timothy Dalton
- Cinematography: Hiro Narita
- Edited by: Michael A. Stevenson; Arthur Schmidt
- Music by: James Horner
- Production companies: Walt Disney Pictures (United States & Canada); Touchstone Pictures (International); Silver Screen Partners IV; Gordon Company
- Distributed by: Buena Vista Pictures Distribution
- Release date: June 21, 1991
- Running time: 108 minutes
- Country: United States
- Language: English
- Budget: $35–40 million
- Box office: $46.7 million (U.S.)

The Rocketeer (released internationally as The Adventures of the Rocketeer) is a 1991 American superhero film from Walt Disney Pictures and released as a Touchstone Pictures film internationally. It was produced by Charles Gordon, Lawrence Gordon, and Lloyd Levin, directed by Joe Johnston, and stars Billy Campbell, Alan Arkin, Jennifer Connelly, Timothy Dalton, Paul Sorvino, Terry O'Quinn and Tiny Ron Taylor. It is based on the character of the same name created by comic book artist and writer Dave Stevens.

Set in 1938 Los Angeles, California, The Rocketeer tells the story of stunt pilot Cliff Secord, who discovers a hidden rocket pack that he thereafter uses to fly without the need of an aircraft. His heroic deeds soon attract the attention of Howard Hughes and the FBI, who are hunting for the missing rocket pack, as well as the Nazi operatives who stole it from Hughes.

Development for The Rocketeer started as far back as 1983, when Stevens sold the film rights to the character. Steve Miner and William Dear considered directing The Rocketeer before Johnston signed on. Screenwriters Danny Bilson and Paul De Meo had creative differences with Disney, causing the film to languish in development hell. The studio also intended to change the trademark helmet design; Disney CEO Michael Eisner wanted a straight NASA-type helmet, but Johnston convinced the studio otherwise. Johnston also had to convince Disney to let him cast actor Billy Campbell in the lead role. Filming for The Rocketeer lasted from September 19, 1990, to January 22, 1991. The special effects sequences were created and designed by Industrial Light and Magic and supervised by animation director Wes Takahashi.

The film was released on June 21, 1991, and received positive reviews from critics. Plans for Rocketeer sequels were abandoned after the film underperformed at the box office, grossing only $46 million domestically on a $35 million budget. An animated television series based on the film, with Campbell reprising his role, premiered on Disney Junior in November 2019. In early 1991, Toy Biz had the rights to a massive Rocketeer toy line, including different versions of Cliff; this was akin to the Kenner Products Batman toy lines. Several prototypes were made, but the toy line was shut down; Disney pulled the license from Toy Biz leaving only Just Toys having the rights.

== Plot ==
In 1938 Los Angeles, California, gangsters from Eddie Valentine's gang steal a prototype rocket pack from aviation magnate Howard Hughes. During their escape from the pursuing police, the getaway driver quickly stops and hides the rocket in a Curtiss JN Jenny biplane cockpit at an airfield. As the chase continues, stunt pilot Cliff Secord's yellow and black Gee Bee Z monoplane is destroyed, dashing his air-racing career hopes. Film star Neville Sinclair has hired Valentine's gang to steal the rocket, and sends his monstrous henchman Lothar to find its location. Meanwhile, Cliff and his airplane mechanic, Peevy, find the rocket and begin testing it.

Cliff's girlfriend is aspiring actress Jenny Blake, who has a small part in Sinclair's latest film; recent events start driving a wedge in Cliff and Jenny's relationship. Sinclair overhears Cliff attempting to tell Jenny about the rocket, so he invites her to dinner. Afterward, at a local air show, Cliff uses the rocket to rescue his elderly friend Malcolm, who is piloting the biplane to save Cliff's job. This makes Cliff an immediate flying sensation, but also sets Sinclair and the FBI on his trail.

Sinclair sends Lothar to Cliff and Peevy's home to find the rocket. The FBI arrives soon after, but Cliff and Peevy escape while Lothar steals the latter's schematic. Later, at the airfield diner, Cliff and Peevy are trapped by several Valentine mobsters; they learn about Jenny's date with Sinclair and the actor's involvement in the hunt for the rocket. The diner patrons overpower the gangsters, but a stray fired bullet punctures the rocket's fuel tank, which Peevy temporarily patches with chewing gum. Cliff flies to the South Seas Club, where he tells Jenny about his new Rocketeer alter ego. The Valentine gang arrives, and in the ensuing melée, Sinclair kidnaps Jenny.

At Sinclair's home, he attempts to seduce Jenny, but she knocks him out and discovers he is a spy for Nazi Germany. She is quickly recaptured and forced to tell Cliff to bring the rocket to the Griffith Observatory in exchange for her life. Shortly thereafter, Cliff is arrested by the FBI and taken to Howard Hughes, who explains that his rocket is wanted by Nazi scientists who have been unsuccessful in developing their own prototype, and shows Cliff a Nazi propaganda film depicting an army of flying commandos using rocket packs to invade the United States. Hughes also mentions that the FBI are trying to locate a Nazi spy in Hollywood employing Valentine's gang, whom Cliff realizes is Sinclair. When Hughes and the FBI demand the return of the rocket, Cliff escapes (using a scale model prototype of the Spruce Goose as a glider), but inadvertently leaves behind a clue to where he is headed.

Cliff flies to the rendezvous, where Sinclair demands that Cliff hand over the rocket. Cliff divulges to Eddie that the actor is a Nazi spy; this infuriates the Valentine gang who, while being gangsters, are still patriots, and they turn their weapons on Sinclair. However, Sinclair summons a hidden troop of heavily armed Nazi S.A., as the German airship Luxembourg appears overhead to evacuate Sinclair and the troops. The FBI, who have secretly followed Cliff, suddenly reveal their presence, and they and the mobsters join forces and battle the Nazis. Sinclair and Lothar escape, dragging Jenny aboard the airship.

Cliff flies to and boards Luxembourg, but during the ensuing showdown, Jenny accidentally starts a fire with a flare gun on the airship's bridge. Sinclair holds Jenny hostage, forcing Cliff to give him the rocket, but not before Cliff covertly removes the chewing gum patching the fuel leak. Sinclair dons the rocket and flies off, but the leaking fuel causes the rocket to catch on fire, leading him to crash into the Hollywood Hills. Crashing into the "LAND" of the "HOLLYWOODLAND" sign, Sinclair perishes in a fiery explosion. Lothar is killed as Luxembourg explodes, but Cliff and Jenny are rescued just in time by Howard Hughes and Peevy flying a Pitcairn PCA-2 autogyro.

Hughes later presents Cliff with a brand-new Gee Bee Z air racer and a pack of Beemans gum. As Hughes leaves, Jenny returns Peevy's stolen rocket blueprint to him, which she found in Sinclair's home; Peevy decides that, with some modifications, he can build an even better one.

== Cast ==
- Billy Campbell as Clifford "Cliff" Secord a.k.a. "The Rocketeer"
- Alan Arkin as A. "Peevy" Peabody
- Jennifer Connelly as Jenny Blake
- Paul Sorvino as Eddie Valentine
- Terry O'Quinn as Howard Hughes
- Timothy Dalton as Neville Sinclair
- Ed Lauter as FBI Agent Fitch
- James Handy as FBI Agent "Wooly" Wolinski
- Jon Polito as Otis Bigelow
- Eddie Jones as Malcolm
- Robert Guy Miranda as Johnny "Spanish Johnny"
- Nada Despotovich as Irma
- William Sanderson as "Skeets"
- Margo Martindale as Millie
- John Lavachielli as Rusty
- Clint Howard as Mark
- Melora Hardin as South Seas Singer
- Rick Overton as South Seas Patron
- Max Grodénchik as Wilmer
- Tiny Ron Taylor as Lothar
- Don Pugsley as "Goose"
- America Martin as Patsy
- Michael Milhoan as Jeff
- Daniel O'Shea as Mike
- Joe D'Angerio as Stevie
- Tommy J. Huff as Lenny
- Pat Crawford Brown as Mrs. Pye
- Paul DeSouza as Pauly
- Julian Barnes as Charlie
- Gene Daily as Clark Gable
- Bob Leeman as W.C. Fields

== Production ==
=== Development ===
Comic book writer/artist Dave Stevens created the Rocketeer in 1982 and immediately viewed the character as an ideal protagonist for a film adaptation. Steve Miner purchased the film rights from Stevens in 1983, but he strayed too far from the original concept and the rights reverted to Stevens. In 1985, Stevens gave writers Danny Bilson and Paul De Meo a free option on The Rocketeer rights. Stevens liked that "their ideas for The Rocketeer were heartfelt and affectionate tributes to the 1930s serial films with all the right dialogue and atmosphere. Most people would approach my characters contemporarily, but Danny and Paul saw them as pre-war mugs".

Stevens, Bilson, and De Meo began to consider making The Rocketeer as a low-budget film, shot in black-and-white and funded by independent investors. Their plan was to make the film a complete homage to Republic's Commando Cody rocket man serials, and use a cast largely associated with character actors. However, that same year, the trio approached William Dear to direct/co-write The Rocketeer, and they eventually dropped the low-budget idea. Bilson, De Meo, and Dear kept the comic book's basic plot intact, but fleshed it out to include a Hollywood setting and a climactic battle against a Nazi Zeppelin. They also tweaked Cliff's girlfriend to avoid comparisons to Bettie Page (Stevens' original inspiration), changing her name from Betty to Jenny and her profession from nude model to Hollywood extra (a change also made to make the film more Disney family-friendly). Dear proceeded to transform the climax from a submarine into a Zeppelin setpiece.

Stevens, Bilson, De Meo, and Dear began to pitch The Rocketeer in 1986 to the major film studios but were turned down. "This was 1986, long before Batman or Dick Tracy or anything similar", Stevens explained. "In those days, no studio was interested at all in an expensive comic book movie. We got there about three years too early for our own good!" Walt Disney Studios eventually accepted The Rocketeer because they believed the film had toyetic potential and appeal for merchandising. The Rocketeer was set to be released through the studio's Touchstone Pictures label; Stevens, Bilson, De Meo, and Dear all signed a contract which would permit them to make a trilogy of Rocketeer films. However, Disney studio chairman Jeffrey Katzenberg switched the film to a Walt Disney Pictures release. According to Stevens, "immediately, Betty and anything else 'adult' went right out with the bathwater. They really tried to shoehorn it into a kiddie property so they could sell toys. All they really wanted at the end of the day, was the name".

Bilson and DeMeo then submitted their seven-page film treatment to Disney, but the studio put their script through an endless series of revisions. Over five years, Disney fired and rehired Bilson and DeMeo three times. DeMeo explained that "Disney felt that they needed a different approach to the script, which meant bringing in someone else. But those scripts were thrown out and we were always brought back on". They found the studio's constant tinkering with the screenplay to be a frustrating process as "executives would like previously excised dialogue three months later. Scenes that had been thrown out two years ago were put back in. What was the point"? DeMeo said. One of Bilson and De Meo's significant revisions to the script over the years was to make Cliff and Jenny's romance more believable and avoid cliché aspects that would stereotype Jenny as a damsel in distress. The numerous project delays forced Dear to drop out as director. Joe Johnston, a fan of the comic book, immediately offered his services as director when he found out Disney owned the film rights. Johnston was quickly hired and pre-production started in early 1990. After Bilson and De Meo's third major rewrite, Disney finally greenlit The Rocketeer.

The characterization of Neville Sinclair was inspired by period film star Errol Flynn. The film's Neville Sinclair is, like biographer Charles Higham's Flynn, a film star known for his work in swashbuckler roles who is secretly a Nazi spy. Because Higham's biography of Flynn was not refuted until the late 1980s, the image of Flynn as a closet Nazi remained current all through the arduous process of writing and re-writing the script. The other real-life characterization was of Howard Hughes. (Note: In the original story, the character of Howard Hughes was the pulp adventure hero Doc Savage.)

=== Casting ===
Casting the lead role of Cliff Secord was a struggle. Disney executive Jeffrey Katzenberg even had one of the studio's staff writers, Karey Kirkpatrick, audition for the part. Kevin Costner and Matthew Modine were the first actors considered for the role. When they both became unavailable, Dennis Quaid, Kurt Russell, Bill Paxton, and Emilio Estevez auditioned. Johnny Depp was Disney's favorite choice, and Paxton commented he came "really close" to getting the lead. Vincent D'Onofrio declined the role and the filmmakers were forced to continue their search.

The decision to cast Billy Campbell as Cliff Secord caused mixed emotions among Disney executives. Director Joe Johnston and creator Dave Stevens believed Campbell was perfect for the role, but Disney wanted an A-list actor. Johnston eventually convinced Disney otherwise. Campbell was not familiar with the comic book when he got the part but quickly read it. He read books on aviation and listened to 1940s period music. He overcame his fear of flying with the help of aerial coordinator Craig Hosking. To ensure his safety, Campbell was doubled for almost all of the flying sequences in conventional aircraft. Ultimately, a scale model devised by ILM puppeteer Tom St. Amand was used for all the rocket pack scenes.

For the female lead of Cliff's girlfriend Jenny, Sherilyn Fenn, Kelly Preston, Diane Lane, and Elizabeth McGovern were considered before Jennifer Connelly was eventually cast. Campbell and Connelly's working relationship eventually became romantic, which Johnston found to be a technique for method acting that helped with their on-screen chemistry. For Secord's sidekick, Peevy, Dave Stevens hoped that Lloyd Bridges would play the part, but Bridges turned it down and Alan Arkin was cast. The part of Neville Sinclair was offered to Jeremy Irons and Charles Dance before Timothy Dalton accepted. Eddie Valentine was written for Joe Pesci, but he declined, so the role went to Paul Sorvino.

Remaining cast members included Tiny Ron Taylor as Lothar, Terry O'Quinn as Howard Hughes, Jon Polito as Otis Bigelow, Ed Lauter as Agent Fitch, Eddie Jones as Malcolm the Mechanic, and Robert Miranda as Spanish Johnny. Rocketeer creator Dave Stevens has a cameo as the German test pilot who is killed when the Nazis' version of a rocket backpack explodes during the takeoff sequence.

=== Filming ===
Principal photography lasted from September 19, 1990, to January 22, 1991. Filming at the Griffith Observatory was done in November 1990. It went 50 days over schedule due to weather and mechanical problems. Rocketeer creator Dave Stevens allied himself with director Joe Johnston and production manager Ian Bryce in an effort to be as heavily involved in the production process as possible and to try and secure as much artistic control from Disney as he could. In particular, Disney was not enthusiastic with Stevens's involvement. He reflected, "I was on the set day and night from pre-production till post-production! And initially, I had to fight to prove that I was there for the benefit of the film, and not for my own ego".

The original production budget was $25 million, but rose to $35 million after Disney became impressed with the dailies. Johnston explained, "they realized this was a bigger movie than they were anticipating and they approved overages. It never got completely out of control". An abandoned World War II runway at the Santa Maria, California airport was the set for the fictional Chaplin Air Field. Additional scenes were shot at Bakersfield. For the air circus scene, 700 Santa Maria extras and 25 vintage aircraft were employed. Aerial coordinator Craig Hosking remarked in an interview, "What makes The Rocketeer so unique was having several one-of-a-kind planes that hadn't flown in years", including a 1916 Standard biplane and a Gee Bee Model Z racer. The sequence where Cliff rescues Malcolm was adapted shot-for-shot from Stevens' comic book. (Note: The Gee Bee Model Z replica built for the film has several significant changes with an extended fuselage and greater wingspan. These modifications were necessitated by the original racer's reputation as having "dangerous" flight characteristics.) (Note: Although aerial footage included actual aircraft, CGI and other scale model work was also included.)

=== Design ===
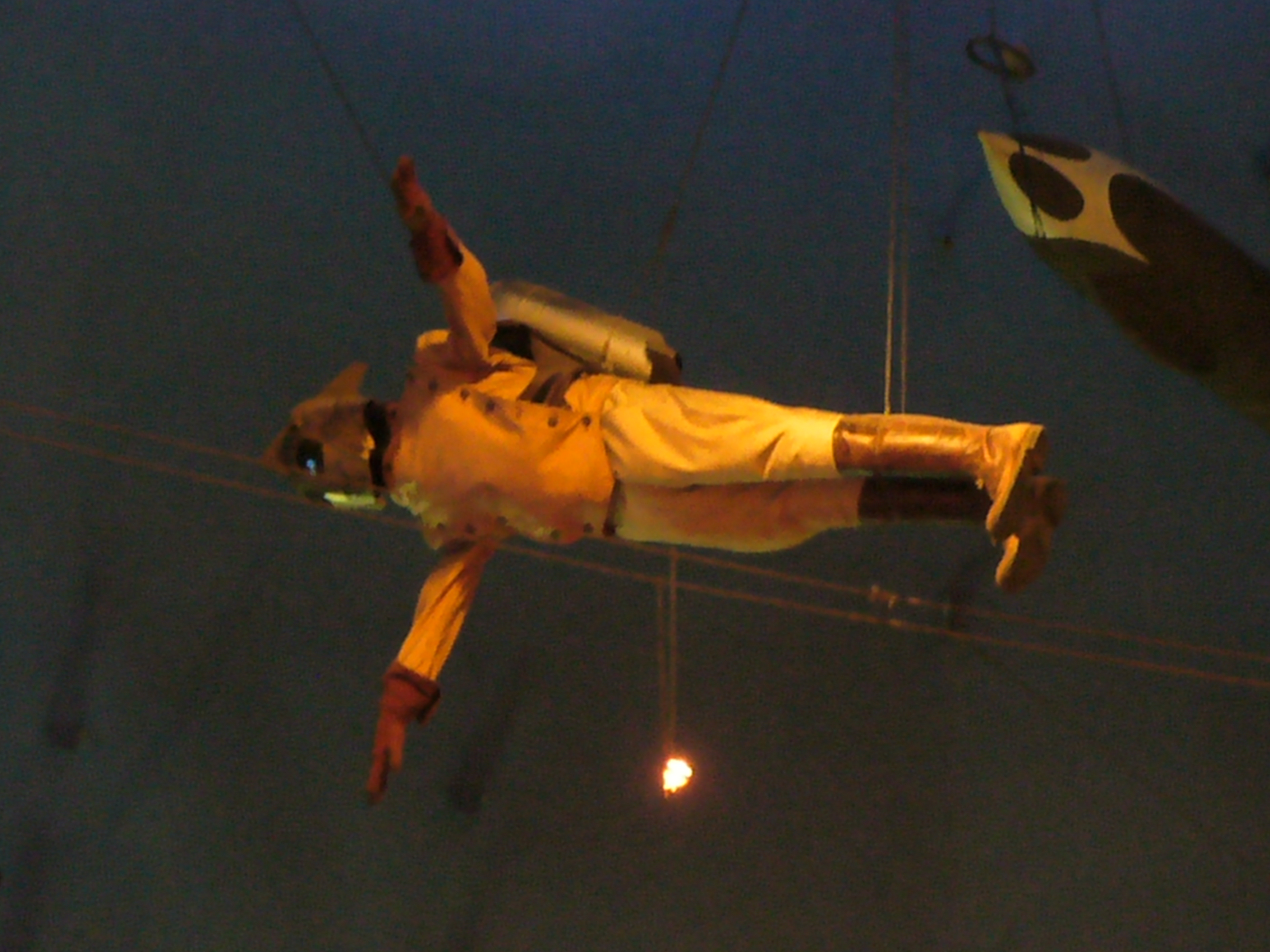
A Rocketeer uniform is on display at Planet Hollywood in Disney Springs.

Stevens gave the film's production designer Jim Bissell and his two art directors his entire reference library pertaining to the Rocketeer at that time period, including blueprints for hangars and bleachers, schematics for building the autogyro, photos and drawings of the Bulldog Cafe modeled after an actual 1920s cafe, the uniforms for the air circus staff, and contacts for locating the vintage aircraft. Stevens remembered that they "literally just took the reference and built the sets". Disney originally intended to change the Rocketeer's trademark helmet design completely. President Michael Eisner wanted a straight NASA-type helmet but director Johnston threatened to quit production. Disney relented, but only after creating several prototype designs that were ultimately rejected by the filmmakers. Stevens asked Johnston for one week to produce a good helmet design. He proceeded to work with a sculptor he knew, made a cast of the main stunt man's head, and brainstormed ideas with the help of his sketches. They produced a helmet that the filmmakers agreed looked appropriate from all angles; in most respects it was identical to the helmet design Stevens had used for his comics series.

Rick Baker designed the Rondo Hatton-inspired prosthetic makeup designs for the Lothar character, portrayed by Tiny Ron Taylor.

=== Special effects ===
ILM's scale modeled-explosion of the Hollywood Sign

The special effects were designed and created by ILM with Ken Ralston (Who Framed Roger Rabbit, Sony Pictures Imageworks founder) serving as the VFX supervisor. Rocketeer director Joe Johnston previously worked at ILM, including on the Star Wars trilogy and Raiders of the Lost Ark and as an art director and model maker, before his film directing career took off. His insistence on a realistic flying rocketman led ILM to devise a lifelike Cliff Secord model that was filmed in stop-motion, coupled with an 18" figurine that was manipulated by hand and in go motion, to create motion blur. The air circus sequence used sped-up Moviola effects, a combination of live-action and stop-motion animation, and a real aerial display held at Santa Monica intercut with film footage.

The Rocketeer's attack on the Nazi Zeppelin was filmed in four months near Six Flags Magic Mountain amusement park in Valencia, California, through pick-ups. Remaining special effects footage was shot at ILM's headquarters in San Rafael and Hamilton Air Force Base. There, they constructed a 12-foot (3.7 m) scale model of the Zeppelin, which was photographed against matte paintings that resemble 1938 Los Angeles for intercutting purposes. The Zeppelin explosion special effect alone cost $400,000.

=== Music ===
The music was composed by James Horner. The soundtrack received positive reviews and was often called one of the film's stronger elements. The soundtrack was released by Hollywood Records and features nearly an hour of music with eight tracks of score and two vocal tracks performed by actress and singer Melora Hardin. An expanded edition was issued in 2016 by Intrada Records. The two songs were arranged by Billy May, who had collaborated with Horner several times in the past.

== Release ==
=== Marketing ===
To promote The Rocketeer, Disney made tie-in endorsements with Pizza Hut and M&M's/Mars candies. An extensive product line followed of video games for MS-DOS, NES, and Super NES. Electronic Gaming Monthly awarded The Rocketeer Video Game as its "Worst Movie-to-Game" of 1992. Toys, posters, trading cards, pins, patches, buttons, T-shirts, and children's clothing, licensed coincided with the film's opening. The studio spent a further $19 million on television advertising alone. A television special documentary, The Rocketeer: Excitement in the Air, was broadcast on the Disney Channel in June 1991. That month, a young adult novelization written by Peter David was published by Bantam Books, and a similar novelization by Ron Fontes, for younger readers, was published by Scholastic Books for Disney Press.

The Rocketeer was premiered at the 1,100 seat El Capitan Theatre on June 19, 1991. This was the first premiere to take place at the El Capitan in more than two years, after a restoration project by Disney.

=== Home media ===
The home video in 1992 on LaserDisc, VHS, and Beta earned an additional $23.18 million in rentals. The musical score, compiled and produced by James Horner, was released in both audio cassette and CD variants. The Rocketeer was released on Region 1 DVD by Buena Vista Home Entertainment on August 17, 1999. No special features were included on the later DVD release, although the 1992 LaserDisc (#1239 as) has the original theatrical trailer. A 20th Anniversary Edition Blu-ray Disc was released on December 13, 2011.

== Reception ==
=== Box office ===
The Rocketeer was released in the United States on June 21, 1991, earning $9.6 million in its opening weekend in 1,616 theaters. Dick Cook, president of Disney's Buena Vista Distribution unit said "We've got to be pleased with the way it's performed, especially since it's not a sequel and has no big-time stars". The film opened #4 behind Robin Hood: Prince of Thieves, City Slickers and Dying Young and eventually grossed only $46.6 million in US box office, making it a commercial disappointment. Outside of the United States and Canada, the film was released through Disney's Touchstone Pictures label, in an attempt to attract the teenage audience it did not reach in North America.

The original Art Deco poster, artistically similar to the famous Monument to Yuri Gagarin, was changed because it failed to draw attention to the cast, including James Bond actor Timothy Dalton. A new poster was designed to feature Dalton, Billy Campbell, and Jennifer Connelly prominently. The film also failed in Britain, grossing just over £1 million in its first two weeks at just under 250 screens. The new advertising campaign was being designed while the British promotional campaign for the film was already under way and some theaters still had the stylized United States film poster.

=== Critical response ===
On Rotten Tomatoes, 73% of 160 critics gave the film a positive review, with an average rating of 6.90/10. The site's consensus states: "An affectionate homage to the adventure serials of yesteryear, The Rocketeer soars above its thin characterizations to pack a wallop of exhilarating aerial action and high-spirited performances." Metacritic gave the film a score of 61 out of 100, based on reviews from 8 critics, indicating "generally favorable reviews". Audiences polled by CinemaScore gave the film an average grade of "A−" on an A+ to F scale.

Roger Ebert enjoyed the film, noting its homages to the film serials of the 1930s–1950s. Although Ebert cited the visual effects as being state of the art, he described them "as charmingly direct as those rockets in the Flash Gordon serials—the ones with sparklers hidden inside of them, which were pulled on wires in front of papier-mâché mountains". Leonard Maltin wrote that the "film captures the look of the '30s, as well as the gee-whiz innocence of Saturday matinée serials, but it's talky and takes too much time to get where it's going. Dalton has fun as a villain patterned after Errol Flynn". Peter Travers of Rolling Stone magazine also gave a positive review. "The Rocketeer is more than one of the best films of the summer; it's the kind of movie magic that we don't see much anymore—the kind that charms us, rather than bullying us, into suspending disbelief".

Internet reviewer James Berardinelli commented that "The Rocketeer may not be perfect, but it's an excellent example of how to adapt a comic book to the screen". Janet Maslin from The New York Times gave a mixed review. She called it "a benign adventure saga that has attractive stars, elaborate gimmicks and nice production values—everything it needs except a personality of its own". Maslin believed that by setting the story in 1938, the filmmakers were more interested in the Art Deco production design and visual effects instead of imbuing the storyline with "inspiration, which may be why it finally feels flat". Hal Hinson wrote in The Washington Post that the film was too concerned with family-friendliness. Jonathan Rosenbaum of Chicago Reader believed both the editing and the storyline were not well balanced and said The Rocketeer ripped off elements of Indiana Jones and Back to the Future. Rosenbaum also cited the casting decision of character actors as being too practical. He explained, "The whole thing is good-natured enough but increasingly mechanical".

Rocketeer creator Dave Stevens acknowledged he was "satisfied with 70% of the film" and highly praised Joe Johnston's direction. Stevens remembered, "The overall spirit and sweetness of the series is still there, intact. We lost some good character stuff in editing for time, but the tone of it is still what I was trying to project in the comic pages. I also thought Joe's casting choices were excellent. To his credit, Joe did not fill out the cast with a bunch of Beverly Hills, 90210 Barbie and Ken-type kids". Stevens found Billy Campbell to be "a good-looking guy, but he also happens to be Cliff! I would never have cast him based on good looks alone, but he came into the audition and just nailed it shut. He was made for it. The part was his". (Note: In pre-release publicity, Campbell had been touted as the perfect Cliff Secord lookalike with allusions to stepping out of a comic book page.)

=== Accolades ===
The Rocketeer was nominated for both the Hugo Award for Best Dramatic Presentation and the Saturn Award for Best Science Fiction Film, but lost to Terminator 2: Judgment Day. Costume designer Marilyn Vance won the Saturn Award for Best Costumes, while Jennifer Connelly (Best Supporting Actress) and VFX supervisor Ken Ralston (Best Special Effects) also received nominations.

== TV series ==
A TV series based on the film premiered on Disney Junior on November 8, 2019. It focuses on Kit Secord, the seven-year-old great-granddaughter of Cliff who receives the rocket and becomes the new Rocketeer. Despite positive reviews, the series was cancelled after one season.

The series features numerous references to the film. Billy Campbell, who portrayed Cliff Secord, voices Kit's father Dave in the series. Cliff is seen throughout the series via flashback where it is established that he acted as the Rocketeer in the past. However the series retcons the setting of Los Angeles to the fictional Hughesville, in reference to Howard Hughes, and to give the series a more childlike innocence. In the episode "Scarlett's Search", Cliff's plane is found which features a photo of Jenny Blake, his love interest from the film. The episode "Rocketeer Day" features a recreation of the climax of the film, and Kit mentions the Rocketeer's battle with Lothar.

== Sequel ==
From the beginning of the process of making The Rocketeer, creator Dave Stevens and screenwriters Danny Bilson and Paul De Meo envisioned it as the first entry of a trilogy. Disney, in particular, hoped the film would carry a vein similar to the Indiana Jones franchise. Both Campbell and Connelly were contracted for sequels, Campbell for two more and Connelly for only one. However, with the disappointing box office performance, plans for a sequel were halted in July 1991. Campbell reflected in 2008, "[Unfortunately] the movie didn't make as much money as Disney had hoped. And that coupled with the acrimonious relationship that the director [Joe Johnston] and the studio had, contributed to them not even considering it".

Although the calls for a sequel remain unrequited, as with many films of this genre, the film has a cult following in both the United States and Japan. In 2008, Medicom, a Japanese toy manufacturer, issued two versions of 12" poseable action figures and replica helmets based on the film. The original Dave Stevens comics and the movie memorabilia retained demand. In addition, Johnston's work on this film led to him being hired 20 years later to direct another period superhero film, Captain America: The First Avenger in 2011.

As of 2012, Disney was reported to be developing a remake of The Rocketeer. Saw series creator James Wan has talked about directing the film.

In July 2016, Walt Disney Pictures confirmed a reboot titled The Rocketeers, written by Max Winkler and Matt Spicer. It was set to be produced by Brigham Taylor, Blake Griffin of the Brooklyn Nets, and Ryan Kalil of the Carolina Panthers. Reportedly a "reboot sequel" takes place six years after the original film, with a black female pilot in the lead role. The lead takes on the mantle of The Rocketeer after Cliff Secord has gone missing while fighting the Nazis. The new Rocketeer goes on a mission to stop a corrupt scientist from stealing rocket pack technology and shifting the power balance of the Cold War. Peter Ramsey expressed interest in directing and suggested several other directors like Gina Prince-Bythewood, Darnell Martin, and Amma Asante. In April 2016, Taylor confirmed it as a sequel.

By January 2020, it was announced that Azia Squire had written a new draft. J. D. Dillard was set to direct. In August 2021, the title The Return of the Rocketeer was announced. Ed Ricourt was hired to write a new draft of the screenplay, with David Oyelowo and his wife Jessica serving as producers, while David may also star as the title role. The plot centers on a former Tuskegee Airman who inherits the rocket pack uniform and the heroic mantle.

In November 2022, Dillard announced that he was no longer attached to direct, as he wanted to take "a breather from period aviation" after having made Devotion.

== Bibliography ==
- Benjamin, Delmar and Steve Wolf. Gee Bee. St. Paul, Minnesota: MBI Publishing Co., 1993. ISBN 0-87938-820-X.
- Bilson, Daniel, Paul De Meo and William Dear. The Rocketeer: Screenplay. S.l.: s.n., Revised June 13, 1990 script.
- David, Peter. The Rocketeer Novelization of the Film. New York: Bantam Books, 1991 ISBN 0-553-29322-2.
- Fontes, Ron. Rocketeer Novelization. New York: Scholastic Inc., 1991. ISBN 0-590-45351-3.
- Holzberg, Roger. The Rocketeer, based on characters created by Dave Stevens: Original screenplay by Danny Bilson, Paul De Meo and William Dear, first draft, May 1990. Hollywood: APA Scripts, June 13, 1990.
- Maltin, Leonard. The Disney Films. New York: Disney Editions, 2000. ISBN 978-0-7868-8527-5.
- Maltin, Leonard, Cathleen Anderson and Luke Sader. Leonard Maltin's Movie Guide. New York: Plume, 2003. ISBN 0-451-20940-0.
- Mills, David. "Movie Views: Rocketeer." Kid's Tribute, Volume 3, Issue 3, Summer 1991.
- The Rocketeer: Excitement in the Air (documentary). Burbank, California: The Wrightwood Group, Walt Disney Television, 1991.
- Smith, Dave. Disney A to Z: The Official Encyclopedia (Third Edition). New York: Disney Editions, 2006. ISBN 978-0-7868-4919-2.
- Stewart, James B. DisneyWar. New York: Simon & Schuster, 2005. ISBN 0-684-80993-1.
- Cotta Vaz, Mark and Patricia Rose Duignan. Industrial Light & Magic: Into the Digital Realm. New York: Del Rey Books, 1996. ISBN 0-345-38152-1.
