= Company of Heroes (film) =

2013 American direct-to-video war film

- Blu-ray Cover Art
- Directed by: Don Michael Paul
- Written by: Danny Bilson; Paul De Meo; David Reed
- Based on: Company of Heroes by Relic Entertainment
- Produced by: Jeffery Beach; Phillip J. Roth
- Starring: Tom Sizemore; Chad Michael Collins; Vinnie Jones; Dimitri Diatchenko; Neal McDonough; Sam Spruell; Jürgen Prochnow
- Cinematography: Martin Chichov
- Edited by: Cameron Hallenbeck
- Music by: Frederik Wiedmann
- Production companies: Destination Films; UFO International Productions
- Distributed by: Sony Pictures Home Entertainment
- Release date: February 26, 2013
- Running time: 100 minutes
- Country: United States
- Languages: English; German

Company of Heroes is a 2013 American direct-to-video war thriller film directed by Don Michael Paul. The screenplay was co-written by Danny Bilson and Paul De Meo. It was loosely based on the video game of the same name. De Meo would later write Company of Heroes 2.

== Plot ==
As the Allies advance into Nazi Germany in December 1944, Lieutnenant Joe Conti orders a squad of American soldiers from the 2nd Infantry Division, led by Sergeant Matheson, to conduct a routine mission near the Elsenborn Ridge in the Belgian Ardennes. The squad's transport convoy is destroyed by German mortar fire. Escaping the ambush, the squad encounter a column of tanks and infantry of the 12th SS Panzer Division. Suffering several casualties in the ensuing firefight, the squad retreats.

On the way back to their own lines to report the incoming German attack, they stumble across a German experimental site near Leidenfeld, still smoldering after a destructive accident. A badly burned OSS agent tells them the Nazis are developing a nuclear bomb which will turn the tide of the war and asks the soldiers to extract Doctor Luca Gruenewald, the lead scientist of the research program, who is willing to defect.

The squad reaches Leidenfeld and boards a cargo train to Stuttgart, but Matheson is wounded during a shootout at the station. Before dying, he passes command of the squad to the inexperienced Nate Burrows. The train is carrying Allied POWs, most of whom are killed when the train is intercepted by the guards in Stuttgart. Burrows' squad is nearly wiped out during the ensuing shootout. Only Burrows and Dean Ransom, a former lieutenant demoted after a botched mission near Saint-Lô, survive.

Joined by Ivan Pozarsky of the Red Army and Brent Willoughby of the RAF, Burrows and Ransom meet “Kestrel”, the OSS agent's contact, at the Stuttgart opera house. Kestrel leads them to an OSS safehouse and explains that Doctor Gruenewald has constructed a functional nuclear bomb for testing by the Waffen-SS the next day. Realizing Burrows and Ransom won't release Gruenewald to the Soviet Union, Pozarsky steals the bomb blueprints and escapes.

Kestrel helps Burrows, Ransom, and Willoughby infiltrate a Nazi nuclear test facility in Haigerloch where they begin freeing prisoners and search for the bomb. When they're cornered by Kommandant Beimler, Pozarsky kills him and his staff, and takes Gruenwald's atomic bomb schematics. Allied planes appear over Haigerloch to bomb it and the survivors escape aboard the transport truck carrying the nuclear bomb. Gruenewald disables the bomb. The Nazis pursue the Allied soldiers, Ransom is shot by Leutnant Schott, Beimler's second-in-command, and Burrows loses consciousness.

Burrows revives at Allied command post. Lieutenant Conti informs him that Ransom died but the mission was a success. Burrows won't receive any recognition or reward, as the events of the mission are classified as secret. Burrows says goodbye to Willoughby, visits his father's grave in France, and departs for the US with Kestrel.

== Cast ==
- Chad Michael Collins as Nathaniel "Nate" Burrows
- Tom Sizemore as Dean Ransom
- Dimitri Diatchenko as Ivan Pozarsky
- Vinnie Jones as Brent Willoughby
- Sam Spruell as Sgt. Matheson
- Alastair Mackenzie as Duncan Chambliss
- Neal McDonough as Lt. Joe Conti
- Richard Sammel as Kommandant Beimler
- Philip Rham as Lt. Schott
- Jürgen Prochnow as Dr. Luca Gruenewald
- Melia Kreiling as Kestrel

== Reception ==
Aaron Peck at home entertainment website High-Def Digest gave the film three stars and said: "It's a decent little DTV movie about World War II, but it isn't able to crawl out of the self-made trench of its miniscule [sic] budget. Peewee Herman fought harder in PeeWee’s Playhouse".
