= Danny Bilson =

American writer and director (born 1956)

- Born: July 26, 1956 (age 70); Los Angeles, California, U.S.
- Occupations: Writer; director; producer; educator
- Spouses: Janice Stango (m. 1980; div. 1990) Heather Medway (m. 1997)
- Children: 3, including Rachel Bilson
- Father: Bruce Bilson

Daniel Bilson (born July 26, 1956) is an American writer, director, and producer of movies, television, video games, and comic books. Together with his frequent collaborator, Paul De Meo, he is best known as the writer for the film The Rocketeer (1991) and creator, writer, producer and director for the television series Viper (1994, 1996), The Sentinel (1996) and The Flash (1990). He has written multiple issues of the comic book The Flash, as well as scripts for multiple video games, including James Bond 007: Everything or Nothing (2003). Da 5 Bloods (2020), based on a screenplay written by Bilson & De Meo, was released following De Meo's death.

While actively working as a writer and producer, Bilson is also a tenured faculty member at the University of Southern California (USC), where he holds the positions of Director of USC Games and the Chair of USC's School of Cinema's Interactive Media and Games Division.

== Personal life ==
Bilson was born into a show business family in Los Angeles, California, the son of Mona (Weichman) (1933–2023) and the director Bruce Bilson (1928–2026) (Bewitched, Get Smart, Hogan's Heroes).

He has three daughters; his eldest, Rachel Bilson (born on August 25, 1981) is an actress, notable for her role in The O.C. and Hart of Dixie. He, his wife Heather Medway, and two younger daughters, live in Los Angeles.

== Career ==
Bilson graduated from California State University, San Bernardino. There he met and teamed up with his best friend and long-time writing partner, Paul DeMeo, and together they founded Pet Fly Productions.

=== Trancers ===
After graduating from college, Bilson worked aggressively to build a career in the movie business, working as an extra while writing screenplays. Bilson and DeMeo produced their first script, Trancers (1985), a noir tale about a time-travelling detective from the future. The movie became a cult classic, and the narrative was so engaging that it evolved into a franchise that generated five sequels. Trancers currently holds an 83% Freshness Score on Rotten Tomatoes.

In 2021, Bilson appeared on late night radio show, The Ghost of Hollywood, where he would discuss his work on Trancers.

=== Zone Troopers and The Wrong Guys ===
Bilson debuted as a director for another cult classic Zone Troopers (1985), also co-written by DeMeo, a tale of American World War II soldiers who find an alien spacecraft. The movie was filmed in Italy.

Following this, the duo performed the same roles in The Wrong Guys (1988) a comedic spoof of boy scouting.

Larry David also visited the set of The Wrong Guys during production.

=== The Rocketeer ===
Bilson and DeMeo began their screenplay adaptation of the comic book The Rocketeer in 1985. While writing for Disney, the partners weathered the ups and downs of five years of movie development. The film was released in theaters in 1991, missing key deleted scenes that were only restored years later as part of the home video release. The Rocketeer has become one of the most beloved Disney live action films of the '90s, with a recent announcement to reboot it as a film franchise as well as an animated series.

=== 1990s television and show running ===
For most of the 1990s, Bilson and DeMeo worked as executive producers and creators on various action-adventure and sci-fi series for multiple studios and networks, including the first TV incarnation of The Flash, and multiple action series Viper, Human Target, and The Sentinel.

During an interview on The Ghost of Hollywood, Bilson discusses he and DeMeo's transition into writing for television and video games after their time working for Empire Pictures.

=== Electronic Arts and The Sims ===
After a chance meeting with then-President of Electronic Arts in 2000, Don Mattrick, Bilson—an avid tabletop and video gamer his entire life—was brought on as a production lead to focus on guiding creative and narrative IP development at EA. During that time, he was a consulting producer for the video game The Sims (2000), as well as creative executive on the EA's Harry Potter video game franchise, working directly with JK Rowling and acting as a liaison between the author, EA, and Harry Potter film distributor Warner Bros. He also wrote for multiple EA game franchises, including Command & Conquer, Medal of Honor, and James Bond 007.

=== THQ ===
In 2008, THQ approached Bilson to take on the role of VP of Creative Production, formally taking on the same function there as he had done informally at EA. Executives at the company, after seeing the positive impact his input had on titles in their development pipeline, and his leadership skills when it came to interacting with developers as well marketing staff, promoted him to Executive Vice President of Global Production and Marketing.

In that role, Bilson led over a dozen internally-owned production studios, and 30+ marketing, administrative and operations staff at THQ's headquarters in Agoura Hills. Bilson — with his partner DeMeo acting as a narrative design executive — focused on building and cultivating "Core game" franchises, lobbying executives for sufficient production and marketing funds to launch and/or maintain new and ongoing franchises such as Saints Row, Red Faction, Darksiders, MX vs ATV, Homefront, De Blob, and Metro 2033. He also led the launches for new installments of Core licensed IP such as WWE Smackdown vs Raw and the launch of the UFC video game franchise.

Despite the positive early results in the Core Business Unit that Bilson managed, the company's outsize investments in its separately-led, declining Kids & Family Business Unit continued to drag on its overall financials. After launching a Nintendo Wii peripheral—the uDraw Gaming Tablet—in 2010, executives at THQ made an aggressive investment in launching a uDraw peripheral for the then-new consoles Xbox 360 and PlayStation 3 in 2011. The product did not sell, resulting in a massive write-off, the shuttering of the Kids & Family division, and sole reliance on the Bilson's Core Games business to drive the company's revenue.

The $100 million shortfall created by uDraw, coupled with ongoing Kids and Family licensing expenses, put the company in dire financial straits from which it never recovered. Bilson left THQ in 2012, succeeded by Jason Rubin, who was the president of THQ before its closure due to bankruptcy on January 23, 2013.

=== Comics, teaching and writing ===
Overlapping with his time at EA and THQ, Bilson and DeMeo continued writing comics, sometimes to support internal THQ IP, but also co-writing The Flash: The Fastest Man Alive for DC Comics with actor Adam Brody, as well a mini-series for Wildstorm Comics called Red Menace.

During his time at EA, Bilson began teaching at the University of Southern California, after being encouraged to do so by his friend and World of Warcraft guildmate, Bing Gordon. There he instructs as an adjunct professor at USC School of Cinematic Arts, where he teaches traditional screenwriting, as well as character development and storytelling for video games.

Bilson continues to work full-time as a screenwriter and producer, while teaching part-time at USC, where he was appointed chair of the Interactive Media and Games Division in 2017.

He was appointed director of USC Games, a joint education program co-managed by USC's School of Cinematic Arts and USC Viterbi School of Engineering, in March 2019.

Bilson's lifelong writing partner and best friend of over 40 years, Paul De Meo, died in 2018, just prior to the finalization of the sale of a script they co-wrote - Da 5 Bloods - to writer/director/producer Spike Lee, fresh off his 2019 Academy Award win for Best Adapted Screenplay for the critically acclaimed film BlacKkKlansman. Da 5 Bloods was distributed by Netflix and the film starred Chadwick Boseman, along with Delroy Lindo and Jean Reno.

In 2022, he participated in a documentary dedicated to the memory of Dave Stevens.

The Rocketeer #1 special comic was published by IDW Publishing in May 2023 .This issue features three new stories starring The Rocketeer character. The first was written by Danny Bilson and Paul De Meo, known for their work on The Rocketeer film, and features artwork by Adam Hughes.

== Filmography ==
=== Film ===
Year	Title
1984	Trancers
1985	Zone Troopers
1986	Eliminators
1988	The Wrong Guys
1988	Pulse Pounders (Trancers: City of Lost Angels segment)
1989	Arena
1991	The Rocketeer
2011	Red Faction origins (movie TV)
2013	Company of Heroes
2020	Da 5 Bloods

=== Television ===
Year	Title
1990-1991	The Flash
1992	Human Target
1994–1999	Viper
1996-1999	The Sentinel

=== Games ===
Year	Title
2000	The Sims
2001	Black & White
2001	Harry Potter and the Sorcerer's Stone
2002	007: Nightfire
2002	Harry Potter and the Chamber of Secrets
2002	Medal of Honor: Allied Assault
2002	Medal of Honor: Frontline
2002	The Lord of the Rings: The Two Towers
2003	Medal of Honor: Rising Sun
2004	007: Everything or Nothing
2004	GoldenEye: Rogue Agent
2004	Harry Potter and the Prisoner of Azkaban
2004	Medal of Honor: Pacific Assault
2004	The Sims: Mega Deluxe
2008	Saints Row 2
2009	Company of Heroes: Tales of Valor
2009	Red Faction: Guerrilla
2009	Warhammer 40,000: Dawn of War II
2010	Darksiders
2010	Metro 2033
2010	Warhammer 40,000: Dawn of War II - Chaos Rising
2011	de Blob 2
2011	Homefront
2011	Red Faction: Armageddon
2011	Saints Row: The Third
2011	Warhammer 40,000: Dawn of War II - Retribution
2011	Warhammer 40,000: Space Marine
2012	Darksiders II
2013	Company of Heroes 2
2013	Metro: Last Light

=== Comics ===
Year	Title
2007	The Flash: The Fastest Man Alive
2007	Red Menace
2023	The Rocketeer #1 IDW

== Award nominations ==
- The Rocketeer nominated for Best Dramatic Presentation, Hugo Awards 1991.
- The Sentinel nominated for Outstanding Directing – Science fiction,.
- Rocketeer Adventure Magazine No. 1 nominated for Best Story or Single Issue
