= Dawn Stern =

American film, television, and theater actress

- Born: June 7, 1966 (age 59)
- Occupations: Actress and model
- Years active: 1983–present
- Spouse: Stephan Wolfert

Dawn Stern (born 1965 or 1966)is an American film television theater actress.

== Early life and education ==
Stern's mother and stepfather are Nancy and Darrel Ziegler. She has a sister and a brother. She graduated from O'Fallon High School in 1985 and graduated from Southern Illinois University at Edwardsville with a BS in Theatre Performance and Broadcast Communications (TV/Radio).

== Career ==
Stern worked as a model with Elite Chicago. She was named one of nine finalists in Revlon's Most Unforgettable Women contest in 1990. In 1992–1993, competing as a spokesmodel, Stern won 10 shows and the semifinal round in Ed McMahon's Star Search '93. In 1996, she moved to Los Angeles, and within six months was appearing as Angela Collins on 413 Hope St., a dramatic television series about an urban teen crisis center, on the Fox network; and Allie Farrow on Viper, a science-fiction television series on the UPN broadcast network. From 2003 to 2004, Stern starred as Callista (Callie) Larkadia in Starhunter 2300, a Canadian science-fiction television series, and scored a recurring role as Vanessa Lerner on the soap opera The Young and the Restless. Most recently, Stern appeared as Cat Ingerslev in a 2012 episode of the HBO television series True Blood.

Stern built a seventeen-year television acting career which includes six pilots, three series regular gigs, over 30 guest star appearances and two films: The Fugitive and Original Gangstas. Currently, she is the COO of DE-CRUIT. Dawn was co-chair of the IDEA Committee for Shakespeare Theatre Association 2021-2023.

== Personal life ==
She is married to Stephan Wolfert, Actor/Writer/Director, founder of DE-CRUIT.
