= James Bond 007: Everything or Nothing (GBA video game) =

- Developer: Griptonite Games
- Publisher: Electronic Arts
- Producers: Steve Ettinger; Michelle Gingrich
- Programmer: Stephen Nguyen
- Writer: Michael Humes
- Composer: Ian Stocker
- Series: James Bond
- Platform: Game Boy Advance
- Release: NA: 17 November 2003
- Genre: Third-person shooter
- Modes: Single-player, multiplayer

James Bond 007: Everything or Nothing is a 2003 third-person shooter video game developed by Griptonite Games and published by Electronic Arts for the Game Boy Advance. As MI6 agent James Bond, the player must foil an ex-KGB agent who plans to use nanotechnology for world domination.

Everything or Nothing was released in November 2003, a few months prior to the release of a home console version. It received "mixed or average" reviews according to Metacritic.

== Gameplay ==
Everything or Nothing is primarily a third-person shooter, played from an isometric perspective. The player controls MI6 agent James Bond. Stealth is emphasized throughout the game, and several driving levels are also featured.

The game is divided into eight missions set around the world. On foot, the player has various weapons and gadgets to use against guard enemies who appear throughout the game. Weapons include guns, grenades, and land mines, and the player can also punch or kick. Medical kits are found throughout the game and are used to replenish the player's health. The player can take cover behind pillars or tables and can rappel down cliffs and buildings on some levels.

M and Q appear after each level to brief the player. In each level, primary objectives must be completed before advancing. Optional secondary objectives are also present in each level, providing the player with Style Points if completed. At the end of each level, the player can use the accumulated Style Points to purchase armor, weapon upgrades, increased speed, and better aiming. A blackjack mini-game can also be unlocked by collecting Style Points. The player can sneak up on guards from behind and quietly take them out for additional points. A radar is used to detect enemy locations, and an alert meter tells the player whether they have been spotted.

The driving portions are played during certain missions and are also viewed from an isometric perspective. The player pursues a primary enemy vehicle and is also followed by several smaller enemy vehicles. The player's car has several weapons such as a machine gun, rockets, and oil slicks.

The game offers a multiplayer deathmatch mode for up to four players, with the use of a Game Link Cable. A GameCube – Game Boy Advance link cable can also be used to connect with the GameCube version of Everything or Nothing, unlocking mini-games and upgraded gadgets, among other features.

== Plot ==
The game opens in the Sahara Desert in Egypt, where James Bond infiltrates and destroys a secret weapons facility. He is then sent to a casino in Cairo, to investigate Arkady Yayakov, an ex-KGB agent and suspected smuggler. It is believed that Yayakov knows about recently stolen nanotechnology. Bond pursues Yayakov in a car chase, and his investigation leads him to a Cairo train yard that Yayakov had used as a shipping base. Bond discovers traces of the nanotechnology and also encounters a former foe, Jaws, whom he defeats in a battle.

MI6 learns that one of Yayakov's clients is an ex-KGB agent named Nikolai Diavolo, who has set up a base in the Peruvian jungle near a platinum mine. Bond meets with Agent 003, who has monitored the base, and they infiltrate the site. 003 is killed, and Bond pursues Diavolo in a car chase. He learns of another compound, hidden within a crypt in New Orleans. There, he discovers Diavolo is working with scientist Dr. Katya Nadanova. She has used a biological agent found in Louisiana to create nanobots that are capable of eating through metals, except platinum. Diavolo plans to unleash an army of platinum-coated super soldiers on the world while using the nanobots to destroy military defenses such as warships and tanks. He plans to initiate his plot in Moscow and intends to launch nanotech missiles to destroy cities unless his demands are met.

Bond escapes the New Orleans facility, and American agent Mya Starling is sent to destroy Diavolo's nanotech plant, located at the Andes Mountains in Peru. Bond is sent there after she goes missing, and he proceeds through the large facility, which extends underground through Incan ruins. Starling escapes, the facility is destroyed, and Bond travels to Moscow to foil Diavolo's plot. He pursues Nadanova's tank stops her, and subsequently fights against Jaws in another battle, before ultimately killing Diavolo.

== Development and release ==
Everything or Nothing was developed by Griptonite Games. The game features the likenesses of Pierce Brosnan (James Bond), Judi Dench (M), Willem Dafoe (Nikolai Diavolo), Heidi Klum (Katya Nadanova), and Mýa (Mya Starling). Mýa also sings the game's eponymous song, heard during the end credits. The actors also provide minimal voice-over lines. Everything or Nothing was published by Electronic Arts for Game Boy Advance. In North America, it was released on 17 November 2003, several months before the home console version.

== Reception ==
Reception

Aggregate score
Aggregator	Score
Metacritic	73/100

Review scores
Publication	Score
Famitsu	25/40
Game Informer	6.75/10
GameSpot	7.1/10
GameSpy	3/5
GameZone	7/10
IGN	8/10
Jeuxvideo.com	14/20
Nintendo Power	4.2/5
X-Play	3/5
Gameplanet	3.5/5
Nintendojo	7.7/10
GMR	6/10
Pocket Games	7/10

Everything or Nothing received "mixed or average" reviews according to Metacritic. Critics generally found the game to be too short, with little replay value.

Frank Provo of GameSpot stated that the game adequately captured "the look and feel of a typical Bond film", and Justin Speer of X-Play said the game has an "authentic Bond feel". The on-foot gameplay was compared to Metal Gear Solid for the Game Boy Color. Matt Helgeson, writing for Game Informer, was critical of the isometric perspective: "It's sort of hard to plan your next move when you can only see about 10 virtual feet in front of you, and as a result it's usually easier to just run and gun your way through the levels".

GameSpy's Avi Fryman considered the game's environments to be "severely limited", writing, "There are few nooks and crannies to explore, few secrets to reveal, and few genuinely interactive objects". Eduardo Zacarias of GameZone criticized the sluggish movements and the difficulty in aiming, and found the game somewhat repetitive. Other critics praised the gameplay. Nintendojo called the amount of variety "very admirable in today's heavily congested Game Boy Advance market".

The driving portions were considered reminiscent of Spy Hunter, with some negative comparisons by critics. Greg Orlando of GMR called the driving portions "unwieldy and dull", and Speer also criticized the poor handling. Fryman found this component of the game "not quite as fun or involved" as Spy Hunter. Conversely, Zacarias praised the driving portions and considered them "highly addictive".

The sound and music were praised. Craig Harris of IGN opined that the audio is "where the game really shines", writing that the soundtrack is "outstanding" and "sets the mood perfectly". GamePro wrote that the soundtrack "really brings out the exhilaration of the espionage action". The graphics also received some praise.
