= Da 5 Bloods =

2020 American war drama film by Spike Lee

- Official release poster
- Directed by: Spike Lee
- Written by: Danny Bilson; Paul De Meo; Kevin Willmott; Spike Lee
- Produced by: Jon Kilik; Spike Lee; Beatriz Levin; Lloyd Levin
- Starring: Delroy Lindo; Jonathan Majors; Clarke Peters; Norm Lewis; Isiah Whitlock Jr.; Mélanie Thierry; Paul Walter Hauser; Jasper Pääkkönen; Jean Reno; Chadwick Boseman
- Cinematography: Newton Thomas Sigel
- Edited by: Adam Gough
- Music by: Terence Blanchard
- Production companies: 40 Acres and a Mule Filmworks; Rahway Road; Lloyd Levin/Beatriz Levin Production
- Distributed by: Netflix
- Release date: June 12, 2020
- Running time: 156 minutes
- Country: United States
- Language: English
- Budget: $35–45 million

Da 5 Bloods is a 2020 American war drama film directed, produced, and co-written by Spike Lee. It stars Delroy Lindo, Jonathan Majors, Clarke Peters, Johnny Trí Nguyễn, Norm Lewis, Isiah Whitlock Jr., Mélanie Thierry, Paul Walter Hauser, Jasper Pääkkönen, Jean Reno and Chadwick Boseman (in his last film to be released during his lifetime).The film's plot follows a group of four aging Vietnam War veterans who return to the country in search of the remains of their fallen squad leader, as well as the treasure they buried while serving there.

Originally written by Danny Bilson and Paul De Meo in 2013, the script was re-worked by Lee and Kevin Willmott following the pair's successful collaboration in BlacKkKlansman (2018). The cast joined in February 2019 and filming began a month later, lasting through June and taking place in Southeast Asia. With a production budget of $35–45 million, it is among Lee's most expensive films.

Da 5 Bloods was released by Netflix on June 12, 2020. It received acclaim from critics, who praised the direction, themes, and the performances of Lindo, Peters and Boseman, with many considering it among Lee's best works. The film received numerous accolades, including nominations for the Academy Award for Best Original Score and Screen Actors Guild Award for Outstanding Performance by a Cast in a Motion Picture, and was named by the National Board of Review as the Best Film of 2020.

== Plot ==
During the Vietnam War, a squad of black US Army soldiers of the 1st Infantry Division, Paul, Otis, Eddie, Melvin, and their squad leader Norman, who dub themselves the "Bloods," secure the site of a Central Intelligence Agency airplane crash and recover its cargo, a locker of gold bars intended as payment to the Lahu people for their help in fighting the Viet Cong. The Bloods decide to take the gold for themselves and bury it so they can retrieve it later. However, in the ensuing Vietnamese counter-attack, Norman is killed, and the Bloods cannot locate the buried gold after a napalm strike obliterates the identifying landmarks.

In the present day, Paul, Otis, Eddie, and Melvin meet up in Ho Chi Minh City. A recent landslide had uncovered the tail of the crashed plane, and with this new information, they plan to find the gold and Norman's body. Otis reunites with his old Vietnamese girlfriend Tiên, who reveals that he is the father of her grown child. Tiên introduces the Bloods to Desroche, a French businessman who agrees to help the Bloods smuggle the gold out of Vietnam once they retrieve it. Soon thereafter, they are joined by Paul's son David, who has a tempestuous relationship with his father.

Vinh, a tour guide hired by the Bloods, leads the group out into the countryside, where a confrontation with a local merchant forces Paul to admit that he has post-traumatic stress disorder. At a hotel bar, David meets Hedy, the founder of LAMB, an organization dedicated to clearing landmines. The next day, Vinh drops off the group and tells them he will pick them up in a few days. During their first night, Paul confiscates a pistol from Otis which had been secretly given to him by Tiên, and becomes suspicious of his motives. Eventually, the Bloods find the gold bars scattered across the side of a hill. They also find Norman's remains and pray over them. Eddie reveals that his excessive spending has rendered him broke but reminds the Bloods of Norman's original plan to give the gold to their black brethren in the United States.

On the hike out, Eddie steps on a landmine and is killed. David also steps on a mine but does not trigger it, just as Hedy and two other volunteers from LAMB, Simon and Seppo, show up. Paul and the others manage to pull David off the mine safely. Paul then holds the three outsiders hostage with Otis's gun, paranoid that they will report them to the authorities. During the night Seppo escapes while David and the others forcibly disarm Paul.

When the Bloods regroup with Vinh, a group of gunmen shows up demanding the gold in exchange for Seppo, whom they have captured. In the ensuing shootout, David is shot in the leg, and Seppo is killed by a landmine. All of the gunmen are killed except for one, who flees. Assuming that Desroche has crossed them, Vinh suggests retreating to a nearby abandoned temple to defend themselves from reinforcements. Unwilling to trust Vinh, Paul takes his share of the gold and heads out into the jungle alone. The remaining Bloods offer Vinh, Hedy, and Simon a share of the remaining gold for their trouble.

As he rages to himself, Paul has a vision of Norman who reminds Paul that he was the one who had accidentally killed Norman during a firefight and that he should let go of his guilt. He is subsequently located and killed by Desroche's men. Desroche, now wearing Paul's MAGA hat, arrives with the gunmen at the temple and is then ambushed by Otis, Melvin, and Vinh. All of his men are subsequently killed. Desroche wounds Otis and tries to finish him off with a hand grenade, but Melvin sacrifices himself by leaping on top of it. As Desroche prepares to execute Otis, David shoots and kills him with Otis's gun.

Vinh helps the surviving Bloods share out the gold. Melvin's widow receives his share, and Eddie's goes to a Black Lives Matter organization. Hedy and Simon donate their shares to LAMB in Seppo's name. Norman's remains are brought home to his family by the military. David reads a letter from Paul, who tells him that he will always love him. Otis visits Tiên and bonds with his daughter for the first time.

== Cast ==
- Delroy Lindo as Paul
- Jonathan Majors as David
- Clarke Peters as Otis
- Norm Lewis as Eddie
- Isiah Whitlock Jr. as Melvin
- Johnny Trí Nguyễn as Vinh
- Mélanie Thierry as Hedy Bouvier
- Paul Walter Hauser as Simon
- Jasper Pääkkönen as Seppo Havelin
- Veronica Ngo as Hanoi Hannah
- Jean Reno as Desroche
- Chadwick Boseman as "Stormin" Norman Earl Holloway
- Lê Y Lan as Tiên
- Nguyễn Ngọc Lâm as Quân
- Sandy Hương Phạm as Michon

== Production ==
=== Development and casting ===
The film was originally a 2013 spec script by Danny Bilson and Paul De Meo titled The Last Tour, with Mike Bundlie and Barry Levine Executive Producing and with Oliver Stone set to direct. Stone dropped out in 2016, and in 2017 producer Lloyd Levin pitched the script to Spike Lee, who performed a re-write with Kevin Willmott. The two changed the film to an African-American perspective, added the film's flashback sequences and expanded the role of the Stormin' Norman character. For his research, Lee credited Wallace Terry's 1984 book Bloods: An Oral History of the Vietnam War by Black Veterans as particularly helpful, and assigned it to the film's actors.

Samuel L. Jackson, Denzel Washington, Giancarlo Esposito, and John David Washington were initially cast in the lead roles but dropped out due to scheduling conflicts. In February 2019, it was announced that Netflix would distribute the film, with Chadwick Boseman, Delroy Lindo, and Jean Reno set to star. Jonathan Majors entered negotiations to join later that month. In March 2019, Paul Walter Hauser, Clarke Peters, Isiah Whitlock Jr., Norm Lewis, Mélanie Thierry, and Jasper Pääkkönen joined the cast of the film. Esposito was also confirmed for the cast, although he later dropped out. This was the final film release of Chadwick Boseman during his lifetime.

=== Filming ===
Filming began on March 23, 2019. Production lasted three months, mostly shooting in Ho Chi Minh City, Bangkok, and Chiang Mai. The ruins where an action sequence takes place, meant to represent the Mỹ Sơn temples, were a specifically constructed set built by the film crew using wood and Styrofoam in a period of two months. Unlike other films, including Netflix's The Irishman, Lee had the main cast (most of whom were in their 60s) play the 20-year-old versions of themselves in flashback sequences without the use of de-aging technology or make-up, bar for the final shot of their younger versions. Lee considered it an effective way to visually show that the aged characters remain trapped in the wartime memories, stating, "These guys are going back in time, but this is how they see themselves."

Da 5 Bloods uses four aspect ratios as framing devices which distinguish between the film's different time periods and locations. The 1960s flashback sequences were shot in 1.33:1 format on 16 mm film, mimicking newsreel footage of the time. Cinematographer Newton Thomas Sigel, who proposed the idea, stated, "Vietnam was the first war that was really televised, and it was predominantly shot with 16-mm. [...] It’s how the American public perceived the war." Netflix executives initially were resistant to the proposal given the challenges it presented, but Lee was adamant and was eventually allowed to proceed. With the exception of a brief scene filmed using a Super 8 camera in 2.39:1 ratio, the modern scenes were shot digitally. The present-day city scenes were framed in widescreen 2.39:1 ratio, evoking the aesthetics of David Lean's epics such as Lawrence of Arabia. The present-day jungle scenes were captured in 1.85:1 ratio, as Lee and Sigel sought to envelop the group with the vastness of the jungle.

== Music ==
The musical score for Da 5 Bloods was written by composer Terence Blanchard. In addition to Blanchard's score, the film features several songs from the early 1970s. Most predominantly, the film contains six songs from Marvin Gaye's 1971 album What's Going On. "That record was released when I was young, but I could feel what was going on in the country," said Blanchard. "When Spike has that music put in a film it becomes extremely powerful for so many reasons." The six main characters share the same first names as the members of The Temptations and their producer Norman Whitfield. A soundtrack album was released by Milan Records on June 5, 2020.

== Release ==
Da 5 Bloods was released on June 12, 2020, by Netflix. Prior to the COVID-19 pandemic, the film was originally scheduled to premiere out-of-competition at the 2020 Cannes Film Festival, then play in theaters in May or June before streaming on Netflix.

== Reception ==
=== Commercial response ===
Upon release, it was the top-streamed film in its first weekend, before falling to sixth place in its second. At their Q2 report meeting in July 2020, Netflix reported the film had been viewed by 27 million households since its release. In November, Variety reported the film was the 16th-most watched straight-to-streaming title of 2020 up to that point. In March 2021, Variety reported the film was among Netflix's most-watched Oscar-nominated titles, and assigned it an "audience appeal score" of 81 out 100.

=== Critical response ===
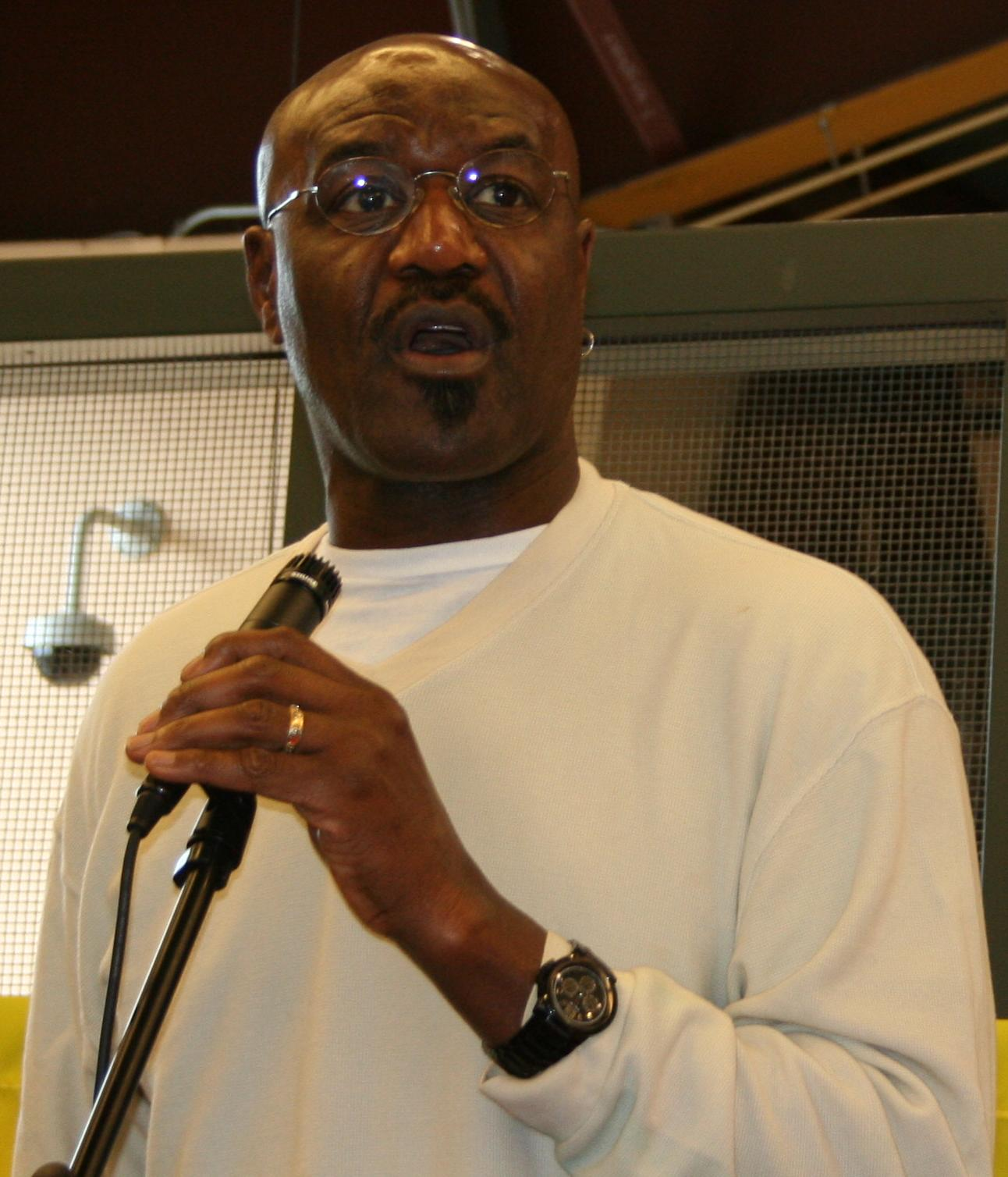
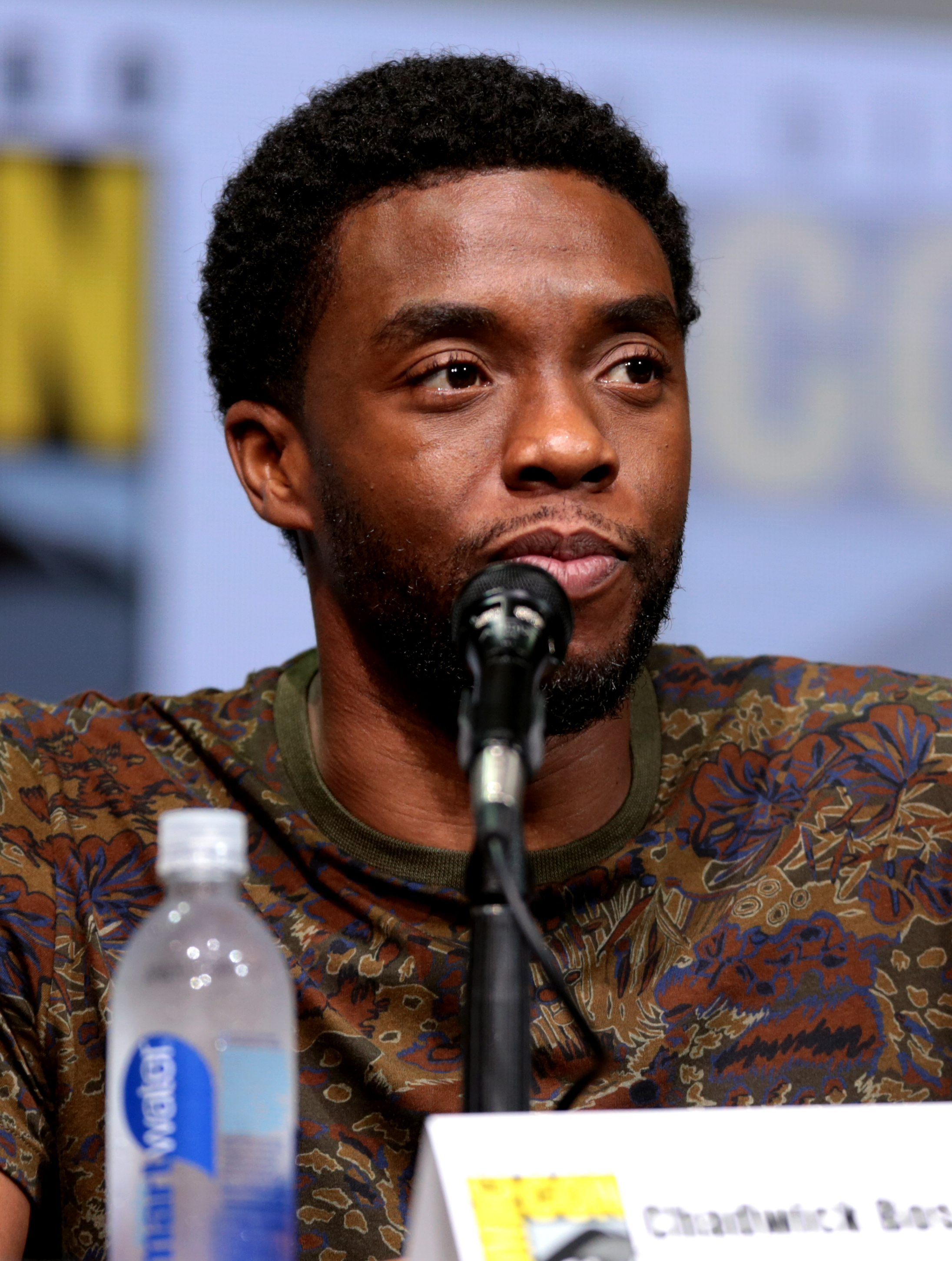
The performances of Lindo and Boseman garnered widespread acclaim.

On review aggregator website Rotten Tomatoes, the film holds an approval rating of 92% based on 303 reviews, with an average rating of 8/10. The site's critical consensus reads: "Fierce energy and ambition course through Da 5 Bloods, coming together to fuel one of Spike Lee's most urgent and impactful films." On Metacritic, the film has a weighted average score of 82 out of 100, based on 49 critics, indicating "universal acclaim".

Writing for the Chicago Sun-Times, Richard Roeper gave the film four out of four, saying: "The picture, the script and director Lee all deserve nomination consideration, as does the lush and booming score by Lee's longtime collaborator Terence Blanchard... Whitlock, Lewis, Peters and Boseman deserve supporting actor conversation, while Delroy Lindo should be an instant contender for best actor". Richard Brody of The New Yorker wrote that the film "runs two hours and thirty-four minutes, but it's not a second too long. On the contrary, it feels compressed, bustling, and frenzied with its intellectual and dramatic energy." David Rooney of The Hollywood Reporter called the film "as timely as today's news", writing: "Lee deftly steers it all full circle in a series of brief wrap-up scenes that are both fancifully tidy and deadly serious, acknowledging the Black Lives Matter movement in a way that allows this sprawling, unwieldy, frequently brilliant film to close on a profoundly affecting note of hope and catharsis. Structural flaws notwithstanding, this movie is a gift right now, and there's no other director that could have made it."

Eric Kohn of IndieWire gave the film a grade of "B" and wrote: "A loose, caustic look at the Vietnam war through the prism of black experiences, Da 5 Bloods wrestles with the specter of the past through the lens of a very confusing present, and settles into a fascinated jumble as messy and complicated as the world surrounding its release." Writing for Variety, Peter Debruge called the film "ambitious but uneven" and said that "Lee interweaves potent social critique with escapist B-movie thrills as four veterans return to 'Nam to claim the loot they were ordered to retrieve decades earlier, but stashed for themselves instead. The result is overlong and erratic, but also frequently surprising...propelled by an unforgettable turn from Delroy Lindo". Ann Hornaday of The Washington Post gave the film three out of four, writing that "its moments of stinging insight and soaring cinematic rhetoric once again prove why Spike Lee might be America's most indispensable filmmaker".

Critic Mark Kermode called the film "a mixed bag". Writing for The Guardian, he gave the film three out of five, praising its political and comedic aspects as well as Lindo's performance, but wrote negatively of its "tonal shifts", noting that "warring elements of Da 5 Bloods appear bolted together". Chuck Bowen of Slant Magazine gave the film two-and-a-half out of four, concluding: "At its best, Da 5 Bloods offers a damning, impassioned, hallucinatory collage of images and ideas concerning the relationship between racism and warfare with superb performances. At its worst, it's a vibrant mess."

Da 5 Bloods appeared on 77 critics' year-end top-ten lists, including ten first-place rankings and six second-place ones.

=== From U.S.-based Vietnamese writers ===
In an article for The New York Times, Pulitzer-winning novelist Viet Thanh Nguyen expressed his mixed feelings. He states, that even with a new central perspective of black soldiers and justified messaging, the film still reanimated tropes such as victimizing Vietnamese and being America-centric. He said, "If one can't disentangle Black subjectivity from dominant American (white) subjectivity, it’s impossible to apply a genuine anti-imperialist critique. Hence the marginalized Vietnamese continuing to serve their role as excuses for a Black drama staged against America's Black-white divide."

Hoai-Tran Bui echoed similar perspectives in her analysis for the blog /Film, saying Lee's work "is haunted by, even enamored with, the legacy of Apocalypse Now". Still, she writes "Lee does take steps to undercut past Hollywood depictions of the Vietnamese people as faceless victims", referencing the major presence of the tour guide character Vinh and the rare focus on Amerasian children.

For the publication AwardsWatch, Nguyen Le sees many areas of the film, "in an imperfect-but-commendable way", a departure from Hollywood's constant portrayal of Vietnam as nothing more than a war. He also wonders the possibility of Vietnamese communities no longer hyper-entrenching themselves in wartime memories and instead focusing on combating anti-black racism from within and without. "As the end of Da 5 Bloods shows, there are more important issues to tend with than the past, sometimes it's because we have finished confronting it", he wrote.

== Accolades ==
Award	Category	Recipients(s)	Result	Ref.
Academy Awards	Best Original Score	Terence Blanchard	Nominated	
American Film Institute Awards	Top 10 Movies of the Year		Won	
Art Directors Guild Awards	Excellence in Production Design for a Contemporary Film	Wynn Thomas	Won	
BET Awards	Best Actor	Chadwick Boseman (also for Ma Rainey's Black Bottom)	Won	
Black Reel Awards	Outstanding Film	Jon Kilik, Spike Lee, Beatriz Levin, and Lloyd Levin	Nominated	
Black Reel Awards	Outstanding Director	Spike Lee	Nominated	
Black Reel Awards	Outstanding Actor	Delroy Lindo	Nominated	
Black Reel Awards	Outstanding Supporting Actor	Chadwick Boseman	Nominated	
Black Reel Awards	Outstanding Ensemble	Kim Coleman	Nominated	
Black Reel Awards	Outstanding Cinematography	Newton Thomas Sigel	Nominated	
British Academy Film Awards	Best Actor in a Supporting Role	Clarke Peters	Nominated	
Casting Society of America	Feature Big Budget – Drama	Kim Coleman & Juliette Menager	Nominated	
Chicago Film Critics Association	Best Film	Da 5 Bloods	Nominated	
Chicago Film Critics Association	Best Director	Spike Lee	Nominated	
Chicago Film Critics Association	Best Actor	Delroy Lindo	Nominated	
Chicago Film Critics Association	Best Supporting Actor	Chadwick Boseman	Nominated	
Chicago Film Critics Association	Best Original Screenplay	Danny Bilson, Paul De Meo, Kevin Willmott & Spike Lee	Nominated	
Chicago Film Critics Association	Best Original Score	Terence Blanchard	Nominated	
Costume Designers Guild Awards	Excellence in Contemporary Film	Donna Berwick	Nominated	
Critics' Choice Movie Awards	Best Picture	Da 5 Bloods	Nominated	
Critics' Choice Movie Awards	Best Director	Spike Lee	Nominated	
Critics' Choice Movie Awards	Best Actor	Delroy Lindo	Nominated	
Critics' Choice Movie Awards	Best Supporting Actor	Chadwick Boseman	Nominated	
Critics' Choice Movie Awards	Best Acting Ensemble	Da 5 Bloods	Nominated	
Critics' Choice Movie Awards	Best Cinematography	Newton Thomas Sigel	Nominated	
Critics' Choice Super Awards	Best Action Movie	Da 5 Bloods	Won	
Critics' Choice Super Awards	Best Actor in an Action Movie	Delroy Lindo	Won	
Florida Film Critics Circle	Best Supporting Actor	Chadwick Boseman	Nominated	
Hollywood Critics Association Awards	Best Picture	Da 5 Bloods	Nominated	
Hollywood Critics Association Awards	Best Actor	Delroy Lindo	Won	
Hollywood Critics Association Awards	Best Supporting Actor	Chadwick Boseman	Nominated	
Hollywood Critics Association Awards	Best Male Director	Spike Lee	Nominated	
Hollywood Critics Association Awards	Best Cast Ensemble	Da 5 Bloods cast	Won	
Hollywood Critics Association Midseason Awards	Best Picture	Da 5 Bloods	Won	
Hollywood Critics Association Midseason Awards	Best Actor	Delroy Lindo	Won	
Hollywood Critics Association Midseason Awards	Best Supporting Actor	Clarke Peters	Runner-up	
Hollywood Critics Association Midseason Awards	Best Supporting Actor	Jonathan Majors	Nominated	
Hollywood Critics Association Midseason Awards	Best Male Director	Spike Lee	Won	
Hollywood Critics Association Midseason Awards	Best Original Screenplay	Danny Bilson, Paul De Meo, Spike Lee, and Kevin Willmott	Won	
Hollywood Music in Media Awards	Best Original Score in a Feature Film	Terence Blanchard	Nominated	
NAACP Image Awards	Outstanding Motion Picture	Da 5 Bloods	Nominated	
NAACP Image Awards	Outstanding Actor in a Motion Picture	Delroy Lindo	Nominated	
NAACP Image Awards	Outstanding Supporting Actor in a Motion Picture	Chadwick Boseman	Won	
NAACP Image Awards	Outstanding Supporting Actor in a Motion Picture	Clarke Peters	Nominated	
NAACP Image Awards	Outstanding Ensemble Cast in a Motion Picture	Da 5 Bloods cast	Nominated	
National Board of Review	Best Film	Da 5 Bloods	Won	
National Board of Review	Best Director	Spike Lee	Won	
National Board of Review	Best Ensemble		Won	
New York Film Critics Circle	Best Actor	Delroy Lindo	Won	
New York Film Critics Circle	Best Supporting Actor	Chadwick Boseman	Won	
Satellite Awards	Best Actor in a Motion Picture – Drama	Delroy Lindo	Nominated	
Satellite Awards	Best Supporting Actor – Motion Picture	Chadwick Boseman	Won	
Saturn Awards	Best Thriller Film	Da 5 Bloods	Nominated	
Saturn Awards	Best Actor	Delroy Lindo	Nominated	
Screen Actors Guild Awards	Outstanding Performance by a Cast in a Motion Picture	Chadwick Boseman, Paul Walter Hauser, Nguyen Ngoc Lam, Le Y Lan, Norm Lewis, Delroy Lindo, Jonathan Majors, Van Veronica Ngo, Johnny Trí Nguyễn, Jasper Pääkkönen, Clarke Peters, Sandy Huong Pham, Jean Reno, Melanie Thierry and Isiah Whitlock Jr.	Nominated	
Screen Actors Guild Awards	Outstanding Performance by a Male Actor in a Supporting Role	Chadwick Boseman	Nominated	
Screen Actors Guild Awards	Outstanding Performance by a Stunt Ensemble in a Motion Picture	Da 5 Bloods	Nominated	
Set Decorators Society of America Awards	Best Achievement in Décor/Design of a Contemporary Feature Film	Jeanette Scott and Wynn Thomas	Nominated	
Visual Effects Society Awards	Outstanding Supporting Visual Effects in a Photoreal Feature	Randall Balsmeyer, James Cooper, Watcharachai "Sam" Panichsuk	Nominated	

== See also ==
- Military history of African Americans in the Vietnam War
- Kelly's Heroes
- Three Kings (1999 film)
- The Treasure of the Sierra Madre (film)
- Charade (1963 film)
