= Viper (TV series) =

Action-adventure TV series

- Title card used in Season 1
- Genre: Action/adventure; Science fiction
- Created by: Danny Bilson; Paul De Meo
- Starring: James McCaffrey; Dorian Harewood; Joe Nipote; Heather Medway; Jeff Kaake; Dawn Stern; J. Downing
- Composer: Eddie Jobson
- Country of origin: United States
- Original language: English
- No. of seasons: 4
- No. of episodes: 78

Production
- Executive producers: Danny Bilson; Paul De Meo
- Camera setup: Single-camera
- Running time: 60 minutes
- Production companies: Pet Fly Productions; Paramount Network Television (1994); Paramount Domestic Television (1996–1999)

Original release
- Network: NBC (1994); Syndication (1996–1999)
- Release: January 2, 1994 – May 22, 1999

Viper is an American action-adventure television series about a special United States task force set up by the federal government to fight crime in the fictional city of Metro City, California, that is perpetually under siege from one crime wave after another. The weapon used by this task force is an urban assault vehicle that masquerades as a Dodge Viper RT/10 roadster and coupe (later, the Viper GTS). The series takes place in "the near future". The primary brand of vehicles driven in the show were Chrysler or subsidiary companies. The series ran on NBC for one season in 1994 before being revived two years later for three more seasons of first-run syndication. Reruns of the series have appeared on Sci-Fi Channel and USA Network.

The Viper Defender "star car" was designed by Chrysler Corporation engineers unlike most Hollywood film/television cars that are usually customized by film picture designers. The exterior design of the car was produced by Chrysler stylist Steve Ferrerio.

== NBC run ==
The original series began filming in Los Angeles Area in early 1993 and was planned to debut on CBS in Fall 1993. However, it was first delayed when Stephen J. Cannell also named his new TV show Viper. After a lawsuit by Chrysler Corporation, Cannell renamed his show Cobra. The premiere of Viper was delayed further when CBS deemed the series to be too violent and decided to bury it. However, due to Chrysler's backing, production of the series proceeded, and was picked up by NBC.

The series originally aired on NBC during the 1993–1994 season, debuting on January 2, 1994, with a two-hour pilot movie, as a mid-season replacement for Against the Grain in NBC's Friday Night 8PM slot. After falling ratings, the series was canceled in April 1994.

The music for the pilot and opening theme for season 1 was composed by Eddie Jobson. Jay Ferguson took over music composition for the rest of the seasons. He composed a remixed theme of the original season-1 opening and the brand new season-4 opening theme.

The Dodge Viper RT/10 Roadsters used in seasons 1–3 were actually not production models. Instead, Chrysler supplied various leftover engineering mules and prototypes of the Viper (still visually the same). Many other cars in season 1 were leftover prototypes, as well. For example, in the pilot movie, the Eagle Premier sedans with yellow vinyl stripes were drivetrain engineering mules for the LH cars (Dodge Intrepid/Chrysler Concorde).

The special effect "hex snakeskin" transformation for the pilot and the first season was done by Metrolight Studios. Tim Claycomb and Tim Eilers took over the transformation sequence after the first season. Sources indicate that it cost $50,000 for each transformation scene in the NBC season.

== First-run syndication version ==
After NBC canceled the series, production company Paramount Television decided to rework Viper for first-run syndication. With the company's syndication unit as distributor, Viper began airing on weekends in September 1996. The only actor to return for season 2 was Joe Nipote in his role as Frankie "X" Waters, and he would remain until the end of the series. James McCaffrey, who played Joe Astor, the Viper's driver in season 1, returned in season 4. Heather Medway, who played Det. Cameron Westlake, was the only new cast member from the show's revival to stay on the entire three syndicated seasons (from 1996 to 1999).

Season 2 was filmed predominantly in Calgary, Alberta. The series was then moved for filming in Vancouver, British Columbia, during seasons 3 and 4. The Cobalt Blue Metallic color on the Viper GTS in season 4 was not an optional color for the production Viper GTS; it was specifically for the show only.

Viper came to an end in May 1999.

== Overview ==
=== Season 1 ===
Metro City was under siege from the crime wave that was begun by "the Outfit", a crime group led in the pilot by a man known only as Mr. Townsend (played by William Russ), and later led by Lane Cassidy (played by Richard Burgi). The Metro City Police Department, or MetroPol, was unable to get a handle on the situation. This led to the creation of the Viper Project, a special top-secret task force created by the federal government to fight the wave of violence sweeping Metro City.

This task force used a modified 1994 Flame Red Dodge Viper RT/10 Roadster sports car that could, at the flip of a secret switch, transform from a muscle car into an armored machine known as "Defender". The "Defender" was an invention of technological specialist Julian Wilkes (played by Dorian Harewood), who was paralyzed during a shootout between police and criminals. The project was delayed by numerous setbacks, mainly because regular drivers were unable to handle this deadly machine. A precision driver was needed for this car.

Michael Payton (played by James McCaffrey), a top driver for the Outfit, was leading his team from their latest heist when he got caught in an accident and was injured. Captured, Payton's memory was erased and he was reborn as Joe Astor, an officer for Metropol. Astor proves to be the only one capable of handling the Defender.

Since the Viper Project successfully made a dent in the profits made by the Outfit, they kidnap Astor and demand that he steal the Defender. He agrees to do so, but changes his mind. In retaliation, the Outfit murders his girlfriend, Elizabeth Houston. As for the Viper Project itself, the Outfit bribes Councilman Strand (played by Jon Polito), the man who approved the Viper Project and orchestrated the erasure of Payton's memory, to help them discredit the project, leading to its cancellation. However, Astor and Wilkes, with the help of mechanic Franklin Waters (played by Joe Nipote), steal the Viper and gain access to Payton's bank account, using both in a private war against crime. Astor runs the operation for several months before he is sent to Europe to handle deep cover operations for the U.S. government, leading to the end of the Viper Team's war on crime.

=== Season 2 ===
Shortly after Astor's departure, Metro City was hit by a second crime wave, this time in the form of a team of renegade ex-commandos led by Col. Hanson Dekker (played by Tim Thomerson), a former U.S. Army Special Forces officer, who served combat tours in Iraq, Bosnia, and Cuba. Against this backdrop, Thomas Cole (played by Jeff Kaake), a CIA agent with evasive driving experience, was selected to head a new Viper Team. He was delivering the new Viper to Metro City when he was pulled over for speeding by two MetroPol officers, Cameron Westlake (played by Heather Medway) and her partner, an officer named Carpenter (played by Roger R. Cross). During this traffic stop, Dekker and his commandos hit the Metro City Bank.

Upon hearing of the bank heist on their radio, Carpenter and Westlake left Cole behind to join their fellow officers at the bank to confront Dekker and his commandos. Officer Carpenter saved Westlake's life by knocking her to the ground when the International Transtar 4300 tractor Dekker was driving smashed through the Metropol roadblock, only to die when he was shot by Dekker's second-in-command, Lee Cyrus (played by Dean Wray). Because of the bank heist, the Viper Project was reborn, with a Metropol liaison to ride shotgun. For this assignment, Westlake's superior, Capt. Harold Benning (played by Mike Genovese), promoted her to detective and sent her to the meeting place, where she found herself meeting Thomas Cole, the very man Carpenter and she pulled over for speeding. She also met Waters, the original mechanic from the first Viper Project, and Allie Farrow (played by Dawn Stern), Viper's systems specialist.

Despite a systems glitch and the kidnapping of Waters by Dekker and his men, the Viper Team defeated them and rescued Waters. Dekker was killed when his Transtar 4300 was blown up by the team to keep it from crashing into Metro Hospital.

After this victory, the Viper Team carried on its crusade against evil, overcoming such obstacles as interference by Special Agent Sherman Catlett (played by J. Downing), a by-the-book bureaucrat from the FBI, to the team being discredited again, this time by Lee Cyrus, the man who murdered Westlake's partner, Officer Carpenter.

Cyrus' scheme to discredit the team involved a replica of the Viper in the Defender configuration, which his men and he used to commit vicious crimes, including a murder. This led Cole's superior, the Administrator (played by Bruce A. Young), to shut down the team. In defiance of orders to stand down, the team cleared their name and Westlake avenged Carpenter's death.

=== Season 3 ===
After serving as the team's systems specialist for several months, Allie Farrow was reassigned to another post, which left Waters to take care of the Defender's systems and mechanical needs by himself. During this period, the team had to contend with new enemies, including Lena Weisinger (played by Stephanie Niznik), a former Stasi agent turned freelance mercenary, who had a personal vendetta against Westlake for killing her lover, Emil Rurik (played by Mike Dopud), during a shootout.

However, after years of successful operation, the team suffered a tragic loss ... not of one of their people, but the car. A notorious criminal named Giles Seaton (played by Peter Wingfield) concocted a plot to steal the Defender by using a criminal named Terry Hawkes (Jeff Kaake in a dual role), who was turned into a Thomas Cole look-alike with plastic surgery. As Cole, Hawkes successfully penetrated the team's headquarters, and despite being exposed by the real Cole, made off with the Viper. To prevent Hawkes from escaping, the team blew up the Viper, keeping its secrets from falling into enemy hands.

=== Season 4 ===
In the aftermath of the Viper's destruction, Cole was permanently reassigned to undercover work on other fronts. With the team gone, Metro City was again gripped by an enormous crime wave, forcing the feds to restart the Viper Team a third time. This time, the car they used was a 1996 Cobalt Blue Metallic Dodge Viper GTS Coupe, which, due to Wilkes, had the equipment of the original Defender, along with some new equipment, most notably the hovercraft mode. Since Cole had been reassigned, Joe Astor, the original driver, was called back to service. However, Astor was haunted by his old Payton identity once more.

== Cast and characters ==
- James McCaffrey as Michael Payton / Joe Astor (seasons 1,4)
- Joe Nipote as Frankie Xavier Waters
- Dorian Harewood as Julian Wilkes (seasons 1,4)
- Jeff Kaake as Thomas Cole / as Terry Hawkes (seasons 2–3)
- Heather Medway as Cameron Westlake (seasons 2–4)
- J. Downing as Agent Sherman Catlett (recurring 2, main 3-4)
- Dawn Stern as Allie Farrow (season 2)

== Episodes ==
=== Series overview ===
Season	Episodes	Originally released		
Season	Episodes	First released	Last released	Network
1	13	January 2, 1994	April 1, 1994	NBC
2	22	September 28, 1996	May 17, 1997	Syndication
3	22	September 23, 1997	May 12, 1998	Syndication
4	22	September 22, 1998	May 22, 1999	Syndication

=== Season 1 (1994) ===
No. overall	No. in season	Title	Directed by	Written by	Original release date	Prod. code
1	1	"Pilot"	Danny Bilson	Paul De Meo & Danny Bilson	January 2, 1994	001 002
2	2	"Pilot"	Danny Bilson	Paul De Meo & Danny Bilson	January 2, 1994	001 002
3	3	"Once a Thief"	Danny Bilson	Darrell Fetty	January 7, 1994	003
4	4	"Ghosts"	Bruce Bilson	Story by : Danny Bilson; Teleplay by : David Newman	January 14, 1994	005
5	5	"Safe as Houses"	Bruce Bilson	Darrell Fetty	January 21, 1994	011
6	6	"Firehawk"	Mario Azzopardi	John Francis Moore	January 28, 1994	006
7	7	"Mind Games"	Mario Azzopardi	Story by : Jim Trombetta & Andrew W. Marlowe; Teleplay by : Andrew W. Marlowe	February 11, 1994	004
8	8	"The Face"	Gus Trikonis	Tommy Thompson	February 18, 1994	012
9	9	"Wheels of Fire"	Bruce Bilson	Story by : Don Kurt; Teleplay by : Bruce Kalish	February 25, 1994	009
10	10	"Past Tense"	Danny Bilson	Story by : Ann Powell & Rose Schacht; Teleplay by : Paul De Meo	March 4, 1994	008
11	11	"The Scoop"	Mike Vejar	Story by : Andrew W. Marlowe; Teleplay by : Howard Chaykin & Andrew W. Marlowe	March 11, 1994	010
12	12	"Thief of Hearts"	Danny Bilson	Howard Chaykin	March 18, 1994	013
13	13	"Crown of Thorns"	James Quinn	Mitch Brian	April 1, 1994	007

=== Season 2 (1996–97) ===
No. overall	No. in season	Title	Directed by	Written by	Original release date	Prod. code
14	1	"Winner Take All"	Danny Bilson	Tommy Thompson	September 28, 1996	101
15	2	"MIG-89"	Joe Napolitano	Howard Chaykin	October 5, 1996	103
16	3	"Condor"	Danny Bilson	Story by : Juan Carlos Coto; Teleplay by : Randy Holland & David Newman	October 12, 1996	107
17	4	"Talk is Cheap"	Don Kurt	David Newman	October 19, 1996	102
18	5	"Diamond in the Rough"	Oscar Costo	John Vorhaus	October 26, 1996	104
19	6	"Standoff"	Steve Stafford	Howard Chaykin	November 2, 1996	108
20	7	"White Fire"	Vern Gillum	Ben Schwartz & Howard Chaykin	November 9, 1996	105
21	8	"Die Laughing"	Jim Johnston	Robert Brennan	November 16, 1996	109
22	9	"On a Roll"	Georg Stanford Brown	Story by : Terry Curtis Fox; Teleplay by : Sonny Gordon	November 23, 1996	110
23	10	"Street Pirates"	Bruce Bilson	Susan Hamilton Brin	November 30, 1996	111
24	11	"Breakdown on Thunder Road"	William Gereghty	Darrell Fetty	January 11, 1997	112
25	12	"Manhunt"	Reza Badiyi	Howard Chaykin	January 18, 1997	113
26	13	"Turf Wars"	William Gereghty	Story by : Darrell Fetty; Teleplay by : Sonny Gordon	February 1, 1997	114
27	14	"Forget-Me-Not"	David Livingston	Susan Hamilton Brin	February 8, 1997	115
28	15	"Wheelman"	Danny Bilson	Gary Glasberg	February 15, 1997	117
29	16	"Shutdown"	Danny Bilson	David Newman	February 22, 1997	116
30	17	"Echo of Murder"	Allan Kroeker	Robert Brennan	March 1, 1997	119
31	18	"Thieves Like Us"	John T. Kretchmer	Story by : Darrell Fetty; Teleplay by : Gary Glasberg & Darrell Fetty	March 22, 1997	118
32	19	"Cold Storage"	Jefferson Kibbee	Darrell Fetty	April 26, 1997	106
33	20	"Whistle Blower"	James Marshall	Darrell Fetty	May 3, 1997	122
34	21	"Black Box"	Robert D. Bailey	Howard Chaykin	May 10, 1997	120
35	22	"The List"	Mick MacKay	David Newman	May 17, 1997	121

=== Season 3 (1997–98) ===
No. overall	No. in season	Title	Directed by	Written by	Original release date	Prod. code
36	1	"Triple Cross"	Danny Bilson	Mark Lisson	September 23, 1997	123
37	2	"Cat and Mouse"	James Marshall	Susan Hamilton Brin	September 30, 1997	124
38	3	"The Best Couple"	Bruce Bilson	David Newman	October 7, 1997	125
39	4	"Hidden Agenda"	Mick MacKay	Howard Chaykin	October 14, 1997	126
40	5	"Out from Oblivion"	Paul Abascal	Darrell Fetty	October 21, 1997	127
41	6	"Storm Watch"	James Marshall	Tom Fudge & Joe Johnson	October 28, 1997	128
42	7	"Cold Warriors"	William Gereghty	Howard Chaykin	November 4, 1997	129
43	8	"First Mob Wives Club"	Gus Trikonis	Deborah Baron & Daryl G. Nickens	November 11, 1997	131
44	9	"Getting MADD"	James Marshall	David Newman	November 18, 1997	132
45	10	"Wilderness Run"	Mick MacKay	Terry D. Nelson	November 25, 1997	130
46	11	"Breakout"	Minor Mustain	Susan Hamilton Brin	January 6, 1998	133
47	12	"The Getaway"	Paul Lynch	Harry Cason & Darrell Fetty	January 27, 1998	134
48	13	"What Makes Sammy Chun"	Scott Williams	Darrell Fetty	February 3, 1998	135
49	14	"Paper Trail"	Paul Abascal	Howard Chaykin	February 10, 1998	136
50	15	"Regarding Catlett"	Jeff Stein	Tom Fudge	February 17, 1998	137
51	16	"Trust No More"	Gus Trikonis	Susan Hamilton Brin	February 24, 1998	138
52	17	"Double Team"	Clay Sassone	Story by : Terry D. Nelson; Teleplay by : Tom Fudge	March 3, 1998	139
53	18	"Hot Potato"	Lee Knippelberg	Story by : Steven Kriozere; Teleplay by : Terry D. Nelson	March 17, 1998	140
54	19	"Homecoming"	James Marshall	Darrell Fetty	April 21, 1998	141
55	20	"Old Acquaintance"	David Newman	David Newman	April 28, 1998	142
56	21	"Internal Affair"	Scott Williams	Howard Chaykin	May 5, 1998	143
57	22	"About Face"	Bruce Bilson	Darrell Fetty & Mark Lisson	May 12, 1998	144

=== Season 4 (1998–99) ===
No. overall	No. in season	Title	Directed by	Written by	Original release date	Prod. code
58	1	"The Return"	Danny Bilson	Mark Lisson	September 22, 1998	146
59	2	"Once a Con"	Scott Williams	Susan Hamilton Brin	September 29, 1998	145
60	3	"Wisegal"	Bruce Bilson	Darrell Fetty	October 6, 1998	147
61	4	"Holy Matrimony"	James Marshall	Terry D. Nelson	October 13, 1998	148
62	5	"Wanted: Fred or Alive"	Gus Trikonis	David Tischman & Richard Alexander	October 20, 1998	149
63	6	"The Full Frankie"	Robert D. Bailey	David Newman	October 27, 1998	150
64	7	"Honest Abe"	Gus Trikonis	Steve Mitchell & Dan Lichtenstein	November 3, 1998	151
65	8	"Aftermath"	Lee Knippelberg	Howard Chaykin	November 10, 1998	152
66	9	"Family Matters"	James Marshall	Joe Johnson	November 17, 1998	153
67	10	"The Really Real Reenactment"	Gus Trikonis	Tom Fudge	December 8, 1998	155
68	11	"Best Seller"	Bruce Bilson	Story by : Howard Chaykin & Joe Johnson; Teleplay by : Joe Johnson	January 5, 1999	156
69	12	"Seminar from Hell"	Scott Williams	Story by : Mark Lisson & Howard Chaykin; Teleplay by : David Newman & Darrell Fetty	February 6, 1999	154
70	13	"People Like Us"	Don Kurt	Terry D. Nelson	February 13, 1999	158
71	14	"My Fair Hoodlums"	Gus Trikonis	Darrell Fetty	February 20, 1999	159
72	15	"Safe House"	James Marshall	Howard Chaykin & David Newman	February 27, 1999	160
73	16	"Tiny Bubbles"	Robert Lee	Susan Hamilton Brin	March 20, 1999	157
74	17	"Of Course, It's a Miracle"	Scott Williams	Howard Chaykin	March 27, 1999	161
75	18	"Holy Terror"	David Newman	David Newman	April 17, 1999	164
76	19	"Hell Hath No Fury"	Gus Trikonis	David H. Balkan	May 1, 1999	162
77	20	"Attack of the Teki-Ya"	Bruce Bilson	Tom Fudge	May 8, 1999	163
78	21	"Split Decision: Part 1"	Danny Bilson	Joe Johnson	May 15, 1999	165
79	22	"Split Decision: Part 2"	Danny Bilson	Howard Chaykin & Darrell Fetty	May 22, 1999	166

== Home media ==
The first season of Viper was released by Kinowelt on German-language DVD in Europe in early 2011. The pilot movie and all 12 episodes are included in the Region 2 PAL Release. They subsequently released the remaining syndicated seasons thereafter.

In 2015, Visual Entertainment (VEI) picked up the DVD rights for The Sentinel, which was produced for UPN by the same production team that was responsible for Viper. TVShowsOnDVD announced on November 11, 2015, that VEI listed Viper on their website's coming soon section. The website stated "complete collection" meaning the NBC and syndicated seasons will launch simultaneously. In March 2017, in a response to a Facebook post about the series' DVD release, VEI announced that it is "coming this summer". In early-November 2017, VEI released a teaser of its release on their YouTube channel. On November 20, 2017, 18 years after the show's finale aired, VEI announced that Viper's English-language DVD release was available for pre-order, along with releasing a high-resolution image of the DVD Box set which confirmed that all 4 seasons (including the 2 hour pilot) will be included. Shipping officially started on December 8, 2017
