= James Bond 007: Everything or Nothing =

2004 video game

- Developer: EA Redwood Shores (Note: Additional work by EA Canada.)
- Publisher: Electronic Arts
- Producers: Scot Bayless; Nicholas Earl
- Designers: Jason VandenBerghe; Chuck Beaver; Serena Lam
- Programmers: Tim Wilson; Brad Gour
- Artists: David Carson; Jay Riddle; Habib Zargarpour
- Writers: Bruce Feirstein; Danny Bilson; Paul De Meo
- Composers: Sean Callery; Jeff Tymoschuk
- Series: James Bond
- Engine: id Tech 3 EAGL (physics)
- Platforms: GameCube; PlayStation 2; Xbox
- Release: NA: February 17, 2004; EU: February 27, 2004
- Genre: Action-adventure
- Modes: Single-player, multiplayer

James Bond 007: Everything or Nothing is a 2004 action adventure game developed by EA Redwood Shores and published by Electronic Arts for the PlayStation 2, GameCube, and Xbox. The game features a cast of voice actors including Pierce Brosnan, reprising his film role as MI6 agent James Bond. Other returning actors include Richard Kiel as Jaws, John Cleese and Judi Dench, as Q and M respectively, alongside Willem Dafoe, Heidi Klum, Misaki Ito, Shannon Elizabeth, and Mýa. It is considered a continuation of Die Another Day (2002), featuring Brosnan and Cleese in their final performances as Bond and Q, respectively.

Development of the game began in 2001. Written by Bruce Feirstein, Danny Bilson, and Paul De Meo, Everything or Nothing centers around Bond dealing with the use of nanotechnology as terrorism. The player controls Bond, and the game includes several driving levels. It is the second Bond game played in third-person after Tomorrow Never Dies (1999), and is the first Bond game to feature a two-player cooperative mode. Everything or Nothing was released in February 2004. It received "generally positive reviews" according to Metacritic.

== Gameplay ==
Everything or Nothing features third-person gameplay and utilizes cover mechanics.

The gameplay is an action-adventure game with a mix of third-person shooting/action sequences and vehicle sequences. In third-person missions, Bond can typically use cover, engage in hand-to-hand combat, use gadgets, and perform some context-sensitive actions, while driving sequences primarily involve racing to a specific objective. The player drives multiple vehicles throughout the game, including the Aston Martin Vanquish, Porsche Cayenne Turbo, a Subaru Impreza rally car, and a Triumph Daytona 600 motorcycle. The player can complete objectives in multiple ways, and players are awarded "Bond Moments" when they complete an objective, feat, or task in a manner consistent with Bond's actions in films. These actions frequently involve the use of Bond's gadgets, which include a rappel gun, remote-controlled Q-Spider drones, and a wristwatch equipped with a strobe flash. A diverse arsenal of ranged weapons is available, headlined by Bond's contemporary standard-issue sidearm, the Walther P99.

The game is identical across each console, aside from minor graphical and sound differences. A cooperative mode was included for two players in which two unnamed operatives must complete missions using the same gameplay mechanics as the single-player portion of the game. The PlayStation 2 version included an online version of this mode. Electronic Arts retired the game's servers in January 2006. Another version of Everything or Nothing was published for the Game Boy Advance and can be linked to the GameCube version via the GameCube – Game Boy Advance link cable, providing unique premium content.

== Plot ==
The game opens in the Pamir Mountains, Tajikistan, 2004, where MI6 agent James "007" Bond infiltrates a stronghold where an organization sells a stolen Soviet suitcase bomb. Bond triggers a firefight between the two factions making the exchange, using the confusion to steal the device and escape.

Following the mission, Bond is briefed on the disappearance of Oxford scientist Dr. Katya Nadanova (Heidi Klum), who oversees a top-secret nanotechnology humanitarian project. Bond's search leads to a weapons research facility in Egypt, where he is ordered to rescue Nadanova and prevent the theft of the nanobot prototypes. Destroying the facility, Bond follows the kidnappers onto an armored train where he encounters and dispatches Jaws (using the likeness of Richard Kiel). Bond discovers Nadanova and rescues her before pursuing the terrorist via helicopter through the Valley of the Kings. Bond defeats the terrorist and takes Nadanova to her safehouse, where, after Bond departs, it is revealed that she is working in conjunction with Nikolai Diavolo (Willem Dafoe), a former KGB agent who seeks revenge for the death of his mentor and friend Max Zorin (the primary antagonist of the 1985 film A View to a Kill). The two intend to repurpose the nanobots for far more sinister purposes than their original intention of repairing nuclear reactors.

Upon returning to MI6, M (Judi Dench) informs Bond of the disappearance of another 00 agent, Jack Mason, alias 003, who was last seen investigating a platinum mine in Peru. Bond is sent there to track down Mason's last known contact, Serena St. Germaine (Shannon Elizabeth), an American geologist who may have a clue to his whereabouts. Serena takes Bond to a mining complex, where he discovers Mason is being tortured by Diavolo. Before succumbing to his wounds, Mason informs Bond that Diavolo intends to move his operations to New Orleans. Bond learns of Nadanova's ties with Diavolo when she captures Serena and throws her out of a helicopter. Bond dives off a cliff to rescue her through the use of Q's (John Cleese) rappel gadget, and the two escape Diavolo's mercenaries via tank.

Searching New Orleans, Bond learns that Diavolo has enlisted a war criminal named Arkady Yayakov to help repurpose the nanobots. Bond infiltrates a factory owned by Diavolo and uncovers a lead pointing to a local nightclub owned by Yayakov, where he crosses paths with Mya Starling (Mýa), an NSA field operative who is also investigating Diavolo. However, Starling's cover is blown, and she is being held in a 19th-century cemetery by Yayakov, who hands her over to local mobster Jean Le Rouge. Bond and Le Rouge chase through the cemetery while dispatching Yayakov's men, eventually reaching a crematorium until Bond kills Le Rouge and rescues Starling.

Bond tracks Diavolo's operations to an abandoned plantation in Louisiana, where he discovers Diavolo has altered Nadanova's nanobots to eat through all metals but platinum, disintegrating everything they come in contact with. After destroying the laboratory and killing Yayakov, Bond reencounters Jaws, who is driving a tanker truck laden with nanobots across the Lake Pontchartrain Causeway towards the levees of New Orleans with the intent of flooding the city. Bond disables Jaws' tanker truck, causing him to lose control and plunge into Lake Pontchartrain, averting the threat of destruction in New Orleans, and Bond returns to Peru to investigate Diavolo's platinum mines.

After winning a rally race hosted by Diavolo, Bond finds he has captured Serena, allowing Diavolo to escape to the mines. After saving Serena, Bond reaches the mines but is captured by Nadanova. Diavolo explains that he intends to use the nanobots to destroy the Kremlin and use his army of tanks, armored with platinum to make them immune to the nanobots, to control Russia and then overthrow Europe. Tied in the path of a mining drill, Bond escapes his shackles and flees the mines in a helicopter piloted by Serena.

Following Diavolo to Moscow, Bond steals one of Diavolo's platinum tanks and uses it to prevent the release of the nanobots in Red Square. He then heads for a missile silo hidden under the Kremlin, where Bond rappels down a large elevator shaft until being confronted by Nadanova and her men. Bond shoots the elevator brakes, causing it to plummet out of control, confronts a flamethrower-wielding Jaws for the third and final time, defeating him in the process, and escapes the collapsing elevator with the aircraft's ejector seat. After heading to the bunker and deactivating the nanotech missiles while dispatching most of Diavolo's men, Diavolo and Nadanova then attack Bond with a Soviet-era fighter jet from an adjacent shaft. Bond destroys the jet, killing Nadanova though Diavolo ejects just in time. Diavolo reaches a control tower, reactivating one of the missiles and targeting it at London. Bond destroys the control tower, where Diavolo managed to launch the missile before plunging to his death into the silo. By destroying the missile as it launches, Bond prevents the catastrophe and reunites with Serena outside the Kremlin.

== Development and release ==
Development of Everything or Nothing began in 2001. Early on, writer Bruce Feirstein was brought in to help create the game's storyline. Feirstein had previously written several recent Bond films. Feirstein wrote the game's screenplay, based on a story by Danny Bilson and Paul De Meo. Everything or Nothing was developed and published by Electronic Arts (EA), which announced the game in May 2003. EA Redwood Shores handled most of the development, while the driving portions were created by a separate EA team based in Canada. The latter team had previously worked on EA's Need for Speed series, and Everything or Nothing uses a modified version of the game engine used for Need for Speed: Porsche Unleashed (2000). While previous Bond games included driving levels, Everything or Nothing offers a wider variety of vehicles.

The game's third-person perspective was a change from the first-person view typically used in earlier Bond games. Game producer Scott Bandy said "we figure that to be Bond, you've got to see Bond. We felt that the first-person perspective, although exciting, didn't put Bond's full potential in the hands of the player. Bond's hand-to-hand fighting style, for example, is almost completely absent in a first-person experience. Bond also fights smart, using cover and corners to his advantage, and third-person is a much better place for that kind of gameplay".

Everything or Nothing is designed to resemble a Bond film. The game features a voice cast of notable actors, some reprising their roles from the films. The cast includes Pierce Brosnan (James Bond), Judi Dench (M), John Cleese (Q), Willem Dafoe (Nikolai Diavolo), Heidi Klum (Katya Nadanova), and Shannon Elizabeth (Serena St. Germaine). The actors also provided their likenesses for the game, including Richard Kiel, reprising his role as Jaws.

A Cyberware scanning machine was used to replicate the actors' faces, and the development team also referenced hundreds of photos and hours of video to fine-tune their appearances. Motion capture was also used. Japanese actress Misaki Ito portrays Q's assistant, Miss Nagai. Klum is featured on the game's North American cover art, while Ito appears on the Japanese cover. Singer Mýa portrays agent Mya Starling, and also performs the titular song "Everything or Nothing". The in-game music was composed by composer Sean Callery, with additional music by Jeff Tymoschuk.

Everything or Nothing was originally set for release on November 4, 2003. However, in September of that year, EA delayed the game until early 2004, allowing for more time in development. EA used the delay to polish the game and to add the cooperative multiplayer mode. Everything or Nothing was completed on January 30, 2004, and began shipping to U.S. retailers on February 17, with release expected within two days. It was released in the U.K. on February 27, 2004. It was one of the first video games to undergo THX's audio certification process.

== Reception ==
Reception

Aggregate score
Aggregator	Score
Metacritic	(GC) 84/100 (PS2) 84/100 (Xbox) 83/100

Review scores
Publication	Score
Edge	5/10
Electronic Gaming Monthly	8.33/10
Eurogamer	6/10
Famitsu	(PS2) 34/40 (GC) 31/40
Game Informer	8.5/10
GamePro	4.5/5
GameRevolution	B
GameSpot	8.8/10
GameSpy	4.5/5
GameZone	(PS2) 9.2/10 (GC) 9/10 (Xbox) 8.9/10
IGN	8.5/10
Nintendo Power	(GC) 4.4/5
Official U.S. PlayStation Magazine	4.5/5
Official Xbox Magazine (US)	8.2/10

James Bond 007: Everything or Nothing received "generally positive" reviews, according to review aggregator Metacritic. GameSpot called it "a really great game, perhaps the best James Bond game ever made". GameSpot later named it the best PlayStation 2 game of February 2004, and it was a runner-up for the publication's annual "Best Game Based on a TV or Film Property" award. IGN named it the Game of the Month for February 2004. IGN said "EA shakes things up and gives us a fresh new perspective on how good Bond can be." The game achieved Platinum Hits status on the Xbox, selling more than two million copies on the Microsoft's console.

Not all critics were as impressed. UK gaming magazine Edge stated, "It's perhaps because the title benefits from such a high production spend, in fact, that the average design and execution becomes more pronounced."

Maxim gave it a perfect ten and stated that players can "race through a shitstorm of artillery fire in a Porsche Cayenne Turbo (complete with "Q-cloak" invisibility feature) or missile-firing Triumph Daytona 600." The Times gave it all five stars and stated that "the over-the-shoulder style does allow for the seamless integration of glossy scenes to drive on the plot and add a more genuine movie-like feel to the game." The Cincinnati Enquirer gave it four-and-a-half stars out of five and called it "An ambitious but successful interactive adventure that blurs the lines between motion pictures and video games." Entertainment Weekly wrote, "Action addicts still get their share of mayhem, however, as EON delivers some spectacular levels, including a breakneck highway chase on a flamethrower-equipped motorcycle. Her Majesty would definitely approve." The Village Voice wrote, "The seamless action—now presented in third person—is spit-shined and ever shifting."

In 2008, Anthony Burch of Destructoid compared the game to a "bad Bond film" such as Tomorrow Never Dies or The World Is Not Enough, citing its mix of "ridiculously bombastic car chases, complete lack of subtlety, and clever cinematic presentation". He was critical of the controls and believed that Everything or Nothing, like previous Bond games, had failed to live up to the success of GoldenEye (1997). He considered it "halfway decent" when judged on its own. In 2015, Dan Griliopoulos of TechRadar ranked it as the second best Bond game of all time, behind GoldenEye.
