= Everything or Nothing (song) =

Song by Mýa

from the album James Bond 007: Everything or Nothing
- Released: October 12, 2004
- Genre: R&B; dance pop
- Length: 3:44
- Label: A&M
- Songwriters: Mýa Harrison; Ron Fair; Randy Bugnitz
- Producer: Ron Fair

"Everything or Nothing" is a song by the American recording artist Mýa. It was written by Ron Fair, Randy Bugnitz and Mýa and recorded for the 2004 James Bond third-person shooter video game James Bond 007: Everything or Nothing, released for the PlayStation 2, Xbox and GameCube consoles. Published by Electronic Arts, the game features the likeness and voice from Mýa who portrays the character Mýa Starling, an NSA double agent who aids James Bond (Pierce Brosnan) in dealing with the use of nanotechnology as terrorism. "Everything or Nothing" was released as a promotional single in support of the game's official release. A jazz version, also produced by Fair, was performed by Mýa on The Tonight Show with Jay Leno in late 2004.

== Background ==
In 2001, video game developer Electronic Arts approached Mýa to be involved in its James Bond franchise. While she expected to be relegated to composing the theme song to the game James Bond 007: Everything or Nothing or providing background music, EA saw her role as broader than that when they asked her to star as a central character named Mýa Starling, an NSA agent posing as a jazz singer opposite James Bond actor Pierce Brosnan. The title of the song and game are based on EON Productions, the production company behind all of the James Bond films.

== Writing and recording ==
"Everything or Nothing" was written by Mýa, Randy Bugnitz and frequent collaborator Ron Fair, while production was overseen by the latter. Mixing of the track was provided by Ben Grosse. EA asked the singer to record a song which would also work in a jazz club as "Everything or Nothing" was expected to be used in a similar environment in a video game sequence. Commenting on the result, Mýa said, "It fit together. It's not like Mya, recording artist, separate and apart from [the game]. It's actually a song that the agent sings within the game. So I get to be myself a little as well as play a character and sing as the character." The first jazz song she ever wrote, Mýa considered writing a Bond theme an opportunity to be a writer "outside of Mýa" as she felt the track marked a breakaway from the concrete and solid coming from a personal experience that she had frequently used on previous records. "'Everything Or Nothing' can mean so many things and the definition and links can be infinite", she said. "So in the lyric writing process there was everything from the analogy between cars and keys versus just relationships or some of the top R&B clichés, you know, when I'm writing my own songs."

Fair produced three different versions of "Everything or Nothing", including the synthesizer–driven main version, a jazz edition and a techno remix. While familiar with the classic Bond songs such as Shirley Bassey's "Goldfinger", Paul McCartney's "Live and Let Die" and Carly Simon's "Nobody Does It Better", Mýa did not immerse herself with the songs that were accompanying the Bond films, though she researched for the techno version of "Everything or Nothing", the first version for which she wrote the lyrics. Unfamiliar with that genre, she took to rave and house music, as well as techno and pop music and invited friends to play music for her. For the jazz rendition, Fair brought in live musician and modified the melody and rhythms of the song.

== Formats and track listings ==
Digital download
No.	Title	Length
1.	"Everything or Nothing"	3:44

Promo CD single
No.	Title	Length
1.	"Everything or Nothing"	3:44
2.	"Everything or Nothing" (Jazz Version)	2:44
3.	"Everything or Nothing" (Techno Remix)	4:22
4.	"Everything or Nothing" (Instrumental)	3:44
5.	"Everything or Nothing" (Jazz Version Instrumental)	2:53
6.	"Everything or Nothing" (Techno Remix Instrumental)	4:20

7" vinyl single
No.	Title	Length
1.	"Everything or Nothing" (Main Version)	3:44
2.	"Everything or Nothing" (Jazz Version)	2:50

== Credits and personnel ==
Credits adapted from the liner notes of Everything or Nothing.

- Music and lyrics – Mýa Harrison, Ron Fair, Randy Bugnitz
- Lead and backing vocals – Mýa Harrison
- Mixing – Ben Grosse
