= List of Pacific Comics publications =

This is a list of publications released by former independent publisher Pacific Comics.

== Pacific Comics ==
- A Corben Special (1984)
- Alien Worlds (1982–1985), #1–7 (moved to Eclipse)
- Arthur Suydam's Demon Dreams (1984), #1–2
- Berni Wrightson Master of the Macabre (1983–1984), #1–4 (moved to Eclipse)
- Bold Adventure (1983–1986), #1–3 (#1–2 present "Timeforce, while #3 presents "Spitfire")
- Captain Victory and the Galactic Rangers (1981–1984), #1–13 + Special (first appearance of Missing Man in #6) (later appeared at Topps Comics)
- Darklon the Mystic (1983), #1 (first appeared in Warren's Eerie)
- Edge of Chaos (1983–1984), #1–3
- Elric of Melniboné (1983–1984), #1–6 (further series at First Comics)
- Groo the Wanderer (1982–1984), #1–8 (moved to Eclipse)
- Jerry Iger's Famous Features (1984), #1
- The Joe Kubert School Presents: 1st Folio (1984), #1
- Ms. Mystic (1982–1984), #1–2 (next appears at Continuity Comics)
- ONE (1977), #1
- Pacific Presents (1982–1984), #1–4 (featuring The Rocketeer, who next appears at Eclipse Comics.)
- Pathways To Fantasy (1984), #1
- Ravens & Rainbows (1983), #1
- The Complete Rog-2000 (1982)
- Silver Star (1983–1984), #1–6 (first appearance of The Mocker in #2) (later appeared at Topps Comics)
- Silverheels (1983–1984), #1–3 (moved to Eclipse)
- Skateman (1983), #1
- Somerset Holmes (1983–1984), #1–4 (moved to Eclipse)
- Starslayer (1982–1983), #1–6 (first appearance of The Rocketeer, who continued in Pacific Presents)
- Sun Runners (1984), #1–3 (moved to Eclipse, later Sirius Comics and Amazing Comics)
- Three Dimensional Alien Worlds (1984), #1
- Thrillogy (1984)
- Twisted Tales (1982–1984), #1–8 (moved to Eclipse)
- Vanguard Illustrated (1983–1984), #1–7 (first appearance of Mr. Monster in #7)
- Vanity (1984), #1–2
- Wild Animals (1982), #1

== Blue Dolphin Enterprises ==
In addition, Pacific Comics published some titles under the name of their parent company, Blue Dolphin Enterprises. These included:

- Paperbacks, U.S.A.: A Graphic History, 1939-1959 (1981) by Piet Schreuders
- Blade Runner Sketch Book (1982)
- Blade Runner Portfolio (1982 Portfolio - 12 Color Plates)
- The Illustrated Blade Runner (1982)
- The Art of Al Williamson (1983)
- Ghita of Alizarr (1983) (by Red Sonja artist Frank Thorne)
- Famous Movie Stars of the '30s (1984) by Toni Rosett
- Heroes of Sports (1984) by Will Eisner
- Planet Comics (1984), #1 (reprints stories from the Fiction House series)

== Schanes & Schanes ==
Schanes & Schanes was the name used for printing of art portfolios and autographed prints, all designed and distributed from the Pacific Comics warehouse. These included:

- Kubla Khan by Frank Frazetta (1977 Portfolio - 5 B&W Plates, 1500 Copies)
- Hello from San Diego (1978)
- Television (1978)
- Cody Starbuck by Howard Chaykin (1978 Portfolio - 6 B&W Plates, 1000 Copies)
- Beyond Heaven and Hell by John Pound (1978 Portfolio - 6 B&W Plates, 1000 Copies)
- Robin Hood by Howard Chaykin (1978 Portfolio - 6 B&W Plates, 1000 Copies)
- The Land of Shadows by Frank Cirocco (1978 Portfolio - 6 Color Plates, 1000 Copies)
- The Dark Suns of Gruaga by Alex Niño (1978 Portfolio - 10 B&W Plates, 1000 Copies)
- Wizards and Warrior Women by Frank Thorne (1978 Portfolio - 6 B&W Plates, 1000 Copies)
- Strange by Marshall Rogers (1979 Portfolio - 6 B&W Plates, 1200 Copies)
- Dragons by Lela Dowling (1979 Portfolio - 6 B&W Plates, 1200 Copies)
- Men, Maiden and Myths by Nestor Redondo (1979 Portfolio - 6 B&W Plates, 1000 Copies)
- Dragon Slayers by William Stout (1979 Portfolio - 7 B&W Plates, 1000 Copies)
- Voltar by Alfredo P. Alcala (1979 Portfolio - 6 B&W Plates, 1000 Copies)
- Erotic Visions by Jean Braley (1980 Portfolio - 7 B&W Plates, 500 Copies)
- The Curse of the Ring by P. Craig Russell (1980 Portfolio - 6 B&W Plates, 1200 Copies)
- The Voyage of the Ayeguy by Josh Kirby (1980 Portfolio - 6 Color Plates, 1200 Copies)
- The Portfolio of Underground Art by various artists (1980 Portfolio - 13 B&W Plates, 1200 Copies)
- Obsessions by Val Mayerik (1980 Portfolio - 6 B&W Plates, 1200 Copies)
- Elfquest by Wendy Pini (1980 Portfolio - 6 B&W Plates, 1500 Copies)
- Elfquest: A Gallery of Portraits by Wendy Pini (1980 Portfolio - 8 Color Plates, 2000 Copies)
- The Seven Dreams of Sinbad by Frank Cirocco (1980 Portfolio - 1 Color Plates, 6 B&W Plates, 1200 Copies)
- Illustrations from Patricia McKillip's The Forgotten Beasts of Eld by Alicia Austin (1981 Portfolio - 6 B&W Plates, 1500 Copies)
- Unicorns by Lela Dowling (1981 Portfolio - 6 B&W Plates, 1200 Copies)
- Unicorns II by Lela Dowling (1981 Portfolio - 6 Color Plates, 2000 Copies)
- Starslayer: The Log of the Jolly Roger by Mike Grell (1981 Portfolio - 6 B&W Plates, 1200 Copies)
- The Heavy Metal Original Pencil Art Portfolio by various artists (1981 Portfolio - 7 B&W Plates, 1000 Copies)
- The Heavy Metal Animation Cel Portfolio by various artists (1981 Portfolio - 8 Color Plates, 1000 Copies)
- Cerebus: Six Deadly Sins by Dave Sim (1981 Portfolio - 6 B&W Plates, 1750 Copies)
- The Art & Imagery of Robert Williams by Robert Williams (1982 Portfolio - 8 Color Plates, 2000 Copies)
- Elfquest III by Wendy Pini (1982 Portfolio - 12 Color Plates, 3000 Copies)
- Fantasy Serenade by Chris Miller (1982 Portfolio - 6 B&W Plates, 750 Copies)
- Stormbringer: The World of Elric by Frank Brunner (1982 Portfolio - 6 Color Prints, 2000 Copies)
- The Nighmares by Tim Conrad (1982 Portfolio - 4 B&W Plates, 2000 Copies)
- Gods and Goddesses by Greg Hildebrandt (1982 Portfolio - 6 Color Plates, 2000 Copies)
- Delicate Embrance by Rick Bryant (1983 Portfolio - 6 B&W Plates, 1200 Copies)
- Dreams of Avalon by Corey Wolfe (1983 Portfolio - 6 Plates, 1200 Copies)
- Dragons II by Lela Dowling (1983 Portfolio - 6 Color Plates, 3000 Copies)
- Dragon Realm by Chris Miller (1983 Portfolio - 6 B&W Plates, 1500 Copies)
- Beauty and Beast by John A. Williams (1983 Portfolio - 6 B&W Plates, 1500 Copies)
- Boris' Beauties by Boris Vallejo (1983 Portfolio - 6 Color Plates, 2000 Copies)
- Mysterious World: The Art of Arthur Suydam by Arthur Suydam (1983 Portfolio - 6 B&W Plates, 2000 Copies)
- Midnight Gods by John Pound (1983 Portfolio - 6 Color Plates, 1200 Copies)
- The Art of Rowena by Rowena Morrill (1983 Portfolio - 6 Color Plates, 2000 Copies)
- Seasons of Wizardry by Carl Lundgren (1984 Portfolio - 6 Color Plates, 2000 Copies)

While Fantasy by Boris Vallejo (6 Color Plates, 2000 Copies) and Fantastic Females by Richard Corben (6 Color Plates - 2000 Copies) were initially advertised as from Schanes & Schanes, after the 1984 closure of Pacific Comics they were actually published by Steve Schanes' Blackthorne Publishing.
