= Laura Molina =

Laura Molina may refer to:

- Laura Molina (artist) (born 1957), Mexican-American artist, musician, and actress
- Laura Molina (beach volleyball) (born 1986), beach volleyball player from El Salvador
- Laura Molina (badminton), badminton player from Spain
