= Battlemage =

Battlemage may refer to:

- Lichdom: Battlemage, a role-playing video game
- Magic The Gathering: Battlemage, a strategy-oriented video game
- Battlemage, the Intel Xe 2 GPU architecture
