= Naked Dave =

Series of paintings by Laura Molina

Amor Alien
- Artist: Laura Molina
- Year: 2004
- Type: Oil, fluorescent enamel & metallic powder on canvas
- Dimensions: 89 cm × 120 cm (35 in × 47 in)
- Location: National Museum of Mexican Art; Chicago

Naked Dave (The Naked Dave Project) refers to a series of paintings created by Laura Molina, inspired by her relationship with illustrator and Rocketeer creator Dave Stevens (1955-2008). A five-month-long relationship between the artists ended in early December 1978 after she miscarried their child at eleven weeks. Molina started the series in 1993 after an attempted reconciliation initiated by Stevens failed to settle things between them.

Stevens protested the use of his likeness, but Molina argued in her website commentary that she was protected from legal ramifications, citing Polydoros v. Twentieth Century Fox Film (67 Cal. App.4th 318, 1997), in which Michael Polydoros contended that David Mickey Evans, the writer-director of the movie The Sandlot had violated his privacy by including a character based on him. The courts ruled in favor of Twentieth Century Fox, stating the film was protected free speech.

== Overview ==
Stevens appears as the objectified subject of six paintings in an internet art presentation called NakedDave.com. It uses male iconography, including Greek gods, cowboys and astronauts to create an idealized depiction of Stevens. In 1998 the paintings were presented on the web with commentary from the artist and her audience. The series, the artist, and website have been the subject of Dora Ramirez's 2005, 33 page essay "The Cyberborderland: Surfing the Web for Xicanidad" in the academic journal Chicana/Latina Studies (journal of Mujeres Activas en Letras y Cambio Social), and were reported by Heidi MacDonald on her weblog, "The Beat - The News Blog of Comics Culture", February 18, 2005. In 2004 film makers Alex Schaffert and David Callaghan made a documentary short film about the project.

A quote from Molina from "NakedDave.com" -

There's something I've realized about why these paintings make people so uncomfortable. Dave Stevens is a "male muse", and an unwilling one at that. The traditional gender roles have been reversed. This upsets the order of things. Women are not supposed to have my technical skill or use it to toy with and objectify a male subject. I do this for the same reason that Dave and other male artists continue to paint and draw naked women....Because I can.

A painting from the series was featured in The New York Times Art & Design section August 25, 2017 For Latino Artists in Sci-Fi Show, Everyone’s an Alien by Jori Finkel.

Laura Molina’s 2004 painting “Amor Alien” playfully takes on the challenges of interracial romance with a beautiful, green-skinned woman draped across the lap of a dashing white man. She looks asleep but as Mr. Hernández points out, the man is even more disempowered — encased in a helmet that suggests he cannot breathe on his own while “the alien queen can survive on her own planet.
