= Games for Health =

Games used for health education

Video Games for Health are games that aim to either educate, promote health or to prevent, diagnose or treat (chronic) diseases. These games, which are generally considered serious games, aim to influence health outcomes by increasing the user's knowledge and changing their behaviors through play. Several Types of Health Games are used in clinical settings, public health programs, and personal wellness contexts, for both physical and mental rehabilitation. These games use elements such as rules, objectives, challenges, and feedback, typically found in entertaining games, to engage individuals with various physical and mental needs, and of different ages, in health related activities.

== Term definition ==
The genre of Games for Health covers digital games which are intentionally designed to prevent, treat, manage, and educate on various health related topics. These include serious games, simulations, and gamified apps that are designed from the first step to consider health and wellness goals While Serious games cover all types of games excluding entertainment, such as military and education, Games for Health are strictly for the use in medical environments.

The main goal for games for health is to foster behavioral changes, improve physical and fine motor skills, and provide support for cognitive rehabilitation. Unlike entertainment gaming, which typically prioritizes fun and amusement, Games for Health are mostly about intentional medicinal impact, often developed with feedback from healthcare professionals to make sure that efficacy is measured correctly, and that progress is not hindered.

=== Interdisciplinary definition ===
The field of Games for Health combines several disciplines such as game design and programming, psychology of designing games with various intentions and motivations, medical knowledge for physical and cognitive rehabilitation, and educational knowledge to improve learning methods. Due to the Interdisciplinary nature of these games, the final design is a game that is not only fun to play, especially considering the wide range of patients that benefit from these games, but is also incorporated into the treatment plan of patients.

An important idea used in Games for Health is the self determination theory, which states that people are motivated when playing video games when they feel personal choice, progress, and connection with others. Although medical guidance dictates that Games for Health must follow proper treatment practices, this theory ensures that patients remain engaged with the game through a series of challenges, increasing difficulty and therefor reward, and social features to avoid alienating patients.

== History ==
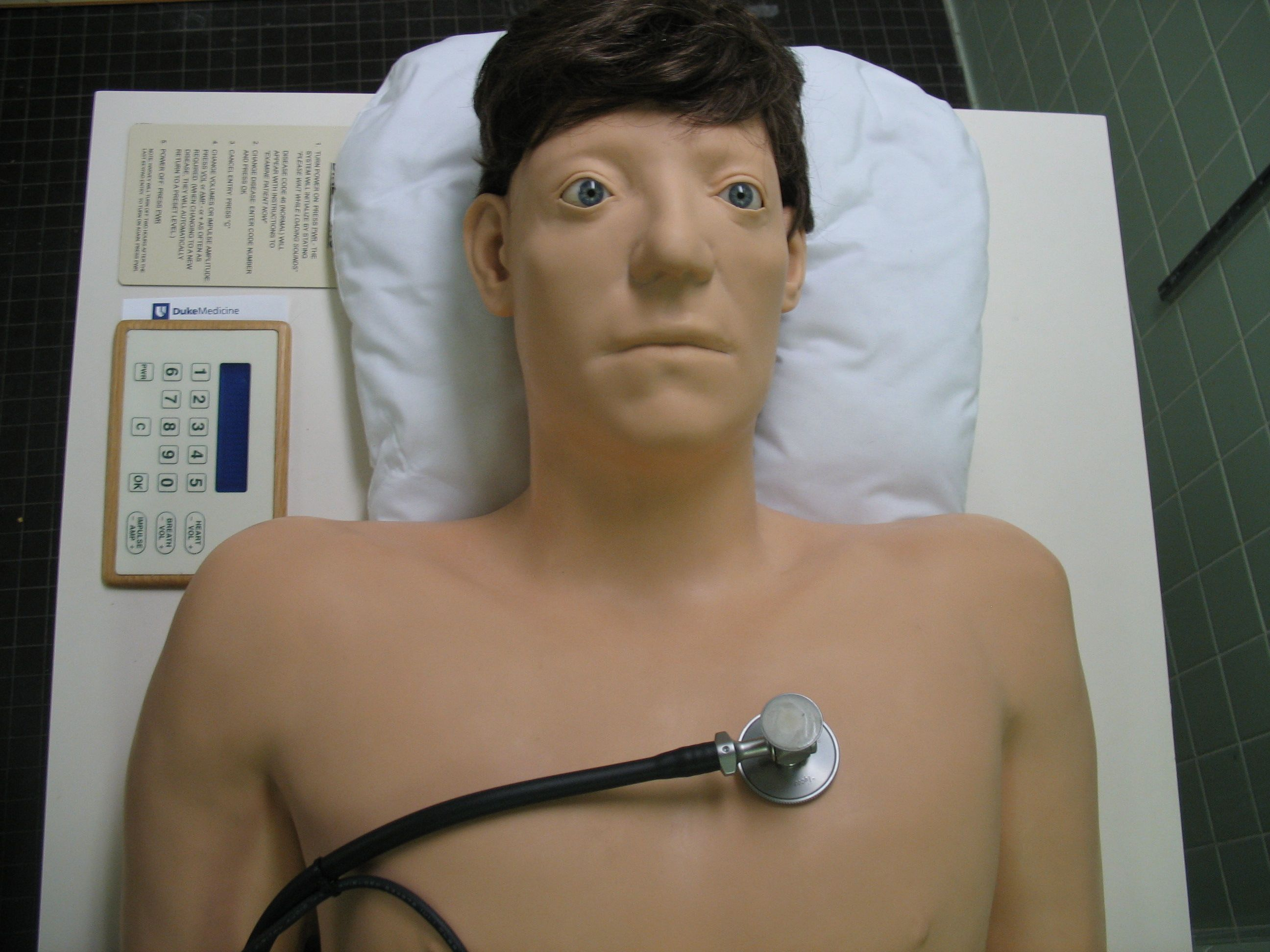
The Harvey Cardiovascular mannequin simulator-1968.

Games for Health were initially developed as tools to educate students in medical training. One of the most notable examples of Games used in the health industry is the Harvey Cardiology simulator, which is a game developed in 1968 as a physical mannequin with audio to teach medical students the use of a stethoscope to listen to heart sounds and murmurs. This Mannequin marks the beginning of digital interactivity in the health industry.

During the 1990s, advancements in Video game technology like CD-ROMs, also allowed the creation of games that are used in the Health industry but also marketed for a broader audience.

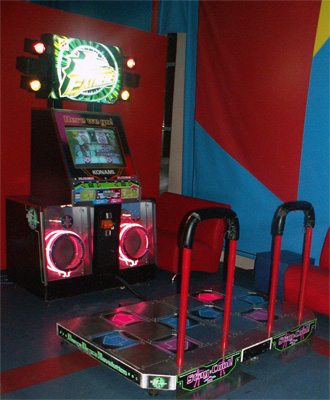
Dance Dance Revolution-1998

In 1998, Konami's Dance Dance Revolution (known as Dancing Stage in Europe), an arcade exergame became popular. Although it was released as an entertaining rhythm game, it inadvertently helped in strength, balance, and dexterity.

By the end of the 1990s, The National Institutes of Health provided funding and support for Video games in the Health industry. This shift legitimized the use of Video Games for health and medical use.

By the early 2000s, Video Games were being programmed for physical and mental rehabilitation of patients, and for educational training of medical practitioners. Re-Mission, a video game released by HopeLab in 2006, was designed for pediatric cancer patients. The game was based on an idea by Pam Omidyar, founder of HopeLab. With her background as a researcher in Immunology, she wanted to create a game that helps young cancer patients fight cancer and learn more about their diagnosis through a series of challenges.

A year later, in 2007, Nintendo released Wii Fit, which helped popularize exergames through movements like yoga and aerobics. The game went on to sell over 22 million units worldwide which brought mainstream interest in health games based in movement and balance.

Adoption of Games for Health institutionally across hospitals and governments helped grow this industry. Towards the end of 2010s, due to the surge of interest from Venture capital, the healthcare gamification market was projected to reach 5.67 Billion dollars by 2025.

== Types of games ==
=== Marketed for patients ===
==== Mental and cognitive rehabilitation games ====
Rehabilitation Games are those designed to help patients recover, rebuild skills lost due to birth complications or accidents, and manage chronic conditions. Many can be personalized to adapt to the patients cognitive or motor training. An example of this is the use of VR hand tracking games that helps patients with epilepsy and survivors of stroke to practice movements such as grabbing items, while ensuring their physical safety.

Some of the examples include EndeavorRx, which is a game used for children with ADHD, through progressively training their attention span by exposing them to challenging tasks. It was created by a team of Neurosurgeons and due to the official authorization from the FDA, must be prescribed by a healthcare professional.

==== Exergames ====
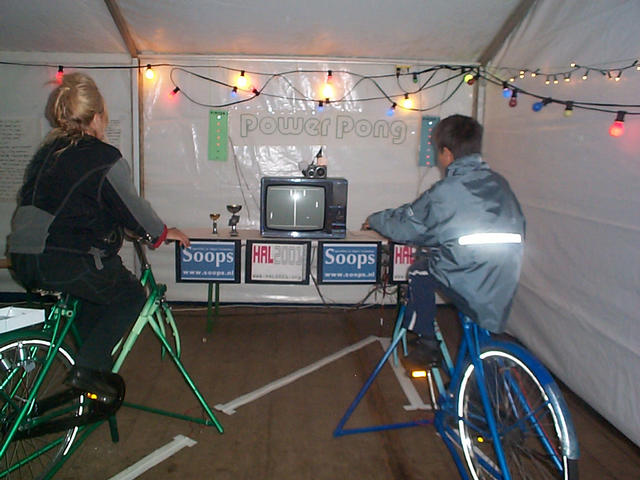
Game of Power Pong-2001

Another type of games made for the Health industry are exergames or fitness games which are games that encourage physical activity. Exergames use motion sensors to allow players to control actions in the game through walking, jumping, dancing, or mimicking any other physical activity. In some cases, Exergames are combined with other technologies such as bikes, or treadmills to facilitate movement.

=== Marketed for medical students ===
Some games for health are developed specifically for medical training and research. They provide simulations that help students practice procedures like laparoscopic surgery. The games simulate operations and aid in hand-eye coordination, depth perception, and familiarizing students with procedure protocol and timing.

== Applications ==
=== Physical rehabilitation ===
Physical Rehabilitation games are systems that use structured therapeutic movement to help improve coordination, balance, motor function and strength. They differ from commercial exergames because they were developed in collaboration with healthcare professionals and are usually used in supervised therapeutic programs. Some of the neurological and musculoskeletal conditions treated are strokes, Parkinson's disease, orthopedic injuries, traumatic brain injury, and balance disorder from old age. The games would use technologies that track, capture, and analyze motion using sensors and platforms that are pressure sensitive.

Physical Rehabilitation Games are mostly used as complementary tools in therapeutic programs since they are mostly designed to increase patient motivation and consistency to treatment plan.

=== Neurological and cognitive rehabilitation ===
The recovery of mental health is aided through Cognitive and neurological rehabilitation games. These types of games help in memory, solving problems, planning, and attention, and they are often used in healthcare settings to help people effected by injury, illness, or any type of cognitive decline. Some of the tasks involved in those games include remembering patterns, reorganizing information, and gauging reflexes based on visual or sound cues. Because these games are based on repetitive tasks, one of their advantages is that they record performance data over time, which helps doctors and patients track improvements.

In the case of stroke patients, game features should not cause anxiety, boredom, or lack of hope about any potential recovery in the future, and it is also best if they resemble commercial games played by the patient prior to the stroke. Some of the features that make a Video Game accessible to stroke patients include closed captioning, customization of game speed and difficulty, audio narration, and hardware that is adaptive to the physical capabilities of the patients such as button sensitivity.

=== Mental health interventions ===
Video games can help patients experiencing anxiety disorders, PTSD, depression, and in some cases phobias. One of the more widely used techniques in these types of games is exposure therapy; patients confront triggers gradually in a safe virtual setting. additionally in some advanced systems, physiological sensors like heart rate monitors are used to measure stress responses.

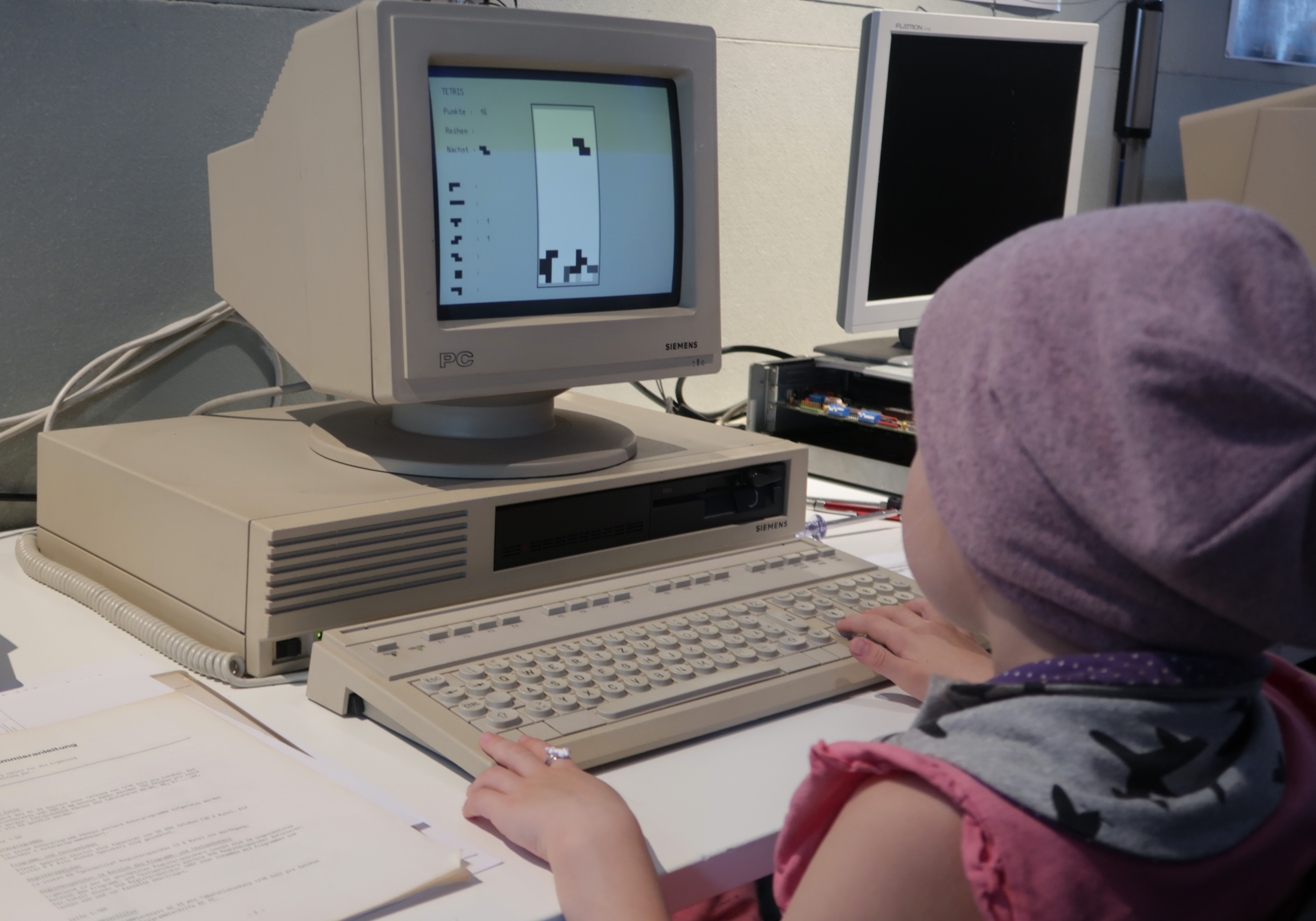
Siemens PC running Tetris

A study at the University of Oxford showed that the game Tetris could help in reducing impact of traumatic memories. The study concluded that those that play Tetris after a traumatic event, more than any other type of distraction, are more likely to severe the formation of intrusive thoughts. The success of this relies heavily on visuospatial processing power. In short, visuospatial processing is a model that explains the relationship between visual cues and the brains ability to multitask. Therefor by playing Tetris, the brain cannot focus on the formation of traumatic images. This helps patients experience fewer flashbacks however because the visual and verbal processes in the brain are wired separately, patients can still recall the details of the event verbally.

Another game is REThink, which is widely accessible through the IOS. It is a stand alone tool that helps regulate emotions in children and teenagers. The game has 7 levels, and each level builds up towards consolidating happiness skills. Additionally the game was tested in clinical trials registered under ClinicalTrials.gov.

=== Medical and professional training ===
Digital simulations can help healthcare professionals practice and improve their technical skills. The two major categories are surgical simulations, and emergency response simulations. Surgical simulation help trainees practice medical procedures using anatomical models that are sometimes fitted with haptic feedback, while emergency response simulations help improve reaction time and response in sensitive scenarios like trauma care, and disaster response.

One of the most established games for medical training is AbcdeSIM. The games simulates an emergency department with virtual patients, and doctors and nurses are taught to care for them while collecting points simultaneously.

=== Public health and preventive education ===
In addition to patient care and medical training, Video games can be used in public health and preventive education. These programs raise awareness across large populations instead of targeted individuals, and they generally encourage healthier eating habits, smoking habits, and exercise using interactive challenges.

Additionally they help in sexual health education specifically with topics like consent, contraception, and STDs, and in some cases they are more beneficial than any other intervention because they operate in a setting that is low in stigma and judgment.

Public Health games gained attention during Covid-19 outbreak in 2020. The DMS Academy Pandemic Simulation helps students navigate a global disease in consideration with ethical issues, economical strain, and patient care.

=== Environmental and spatial health simulation ===
Some environments can be simulated virtually to help people move through those spaces. This is especially beneficial for patients with dementia as they generally struggle with memory and navigation. Virtual stimulations can either help dementia patients more through spaces they are familiar with safely, or help researchers and architects design spaces and layouts that are easy to navigate.

== Design principles ==
The main design principle in Games for Health is transfer of training, which means that any skills learned in video games should work in real life. Simulators must respond realistically with users and they must monitor progress to reflect changes. To do so, some of the design features are immediate feedback, and gradual increase in difficulty.

Clinically, it is important to highlight not only if a game is effective for treatment but also why it is effective. To accurately identify design features for Games for health, Sawyer and smith's taxonomy is a framework that help categorize games by their domain(professional practice, personal, academia, or public health).

Sawyer and Smith Serious Games Taxonomy (2008)
| | Games for health | Advergames | Games for training | Games for education | Games for science | Production | Games as work |
| Government and NGO | === Public Health, Education and Mass casualty Response === | Political games | Employee training | Inform public | Data collection | Strategic planning | public diplomacy |
| Defense | Rehabilitation and wellness | Recruitment and propaganda | support training | school house education | wargames planning | weapon research | command and control |
| Healthcare | Exergames | public health awareness campaigns | training games for health professionals | disease management | epidemiology | biotech design | public health logistics |
| Marketing | advertising treatment | product placement | product use | product information | opinion research | machinima | opinion research |
| Education | inform about disease | social issue games | train teachers | learning | computer science | P2P learning constructive documentary | distance learning |
| Corporate | employee health information | customer education | employee training | certification | Ad visualization | strategic planning | command and control |
| Industry | occupational safety | sales and recruitment | employee training | workforce education | process optimization simulation | biotech design | command and control |

A study conducted at Georgia Institute of Technology, showed themes common across all Video Games for Health. Those include Player characteristics such as health goal, and health status. Health model based on disease and level of seriousness. Game world development based on abstraction, quests, rewards, and storytelling. Game mechanics including Core loop, feedback, challenges, checkpoint, speed, and patterns. Player Behavior like exploration, interaction, and motivation. Context including modality, social play, and audience. and lastly possible outcomes such as behavioral changes, effectiveness, distraction, and reflection all account towards effectiveness of video Games for treatment plans.

== Criticism and limitations ==
Games for Health sometimes do not work the same for everyone, and while some studies show positive results like the Tetris model for PTSD, others only show small improvements. Another concern is in cases where the simulation graphics are poorly designed, there may not be a successful transfer of training to real life.

In addition, cost and access can also be a problem, especially since the FDA is yet to insure such treatments. Because of these reasons, Games for Health are generally used to support existing medical care and not meant to replace traditional treatments, and real life medical practice.

== Examples of games for health ==
- Re-Mission 2: Nanobot's Revenge by HopeLab. For Treatment of Cancer
- Bronki the Bronchiosaurus by Raya Systems. For Asthma Treatment
- Bubble Rubble by Playnormous. For Physical Activity
- Chicken Farm by Nobel Media. For Nutrition and wellbeing
- Colorfall by Persuasive Games. For Mental health
- Dex: Virtual Pet by Georgia Regents University. For Diabetes
- Snow World by University of Washington. For Pain management
- Virtual Iraq by Virtually better. For PTSD

== Games for Health in the industry ==
=== Conference ===
Games for Health is also the name of series of conferences made possible in part by funding from the Robert Wood Johnson Foundation as part of their Pioneer Portfolio program. Games for Health is a part of the Serious Games Initiative.

The conference has received media attention for its work to showcase the health and research implications of video games.

- September 2004 – Madison, Wisconsin
- September 2005 – Baltimore, Maryland
- September 2006 – Baltimore, Maryland
- May 2008 – Baltimore, Maryland
- June 2009 – Boston, Massachusetts
- May 2010 – Boston, Massachusetts

=== Journal ===
Games for Health Journal is also a peer-reviewed journal, which was launched in February 2012 and is published by Mary Ann Liebert publishers.

== See also ==
- Exergaming
- Serious Games
- Medical Simulations
- Traumatic memories
- Baddeley's model of working memory
