= Realtime Associates =

American video game developer and publisher

Realtime Associates, Inc.
- Type: Private
- Industry: Video games
- Founded: 1986
- Headquarters: El Segundo, California
- Key people: David Warhol (President)
- Products: Bug! series
- Website: rtassoc.com

Realtime Associates, Inc. is an American video game developer and publisher. The company was founded in 1986 by David Warhol and a group of ex-Mattel Electronics employees originally to create games for the Intellivision system. Since then, the company has developed and published over 90 games for systems including the PlayStation 2, Xbox, GameCube, Saturn, PlayStation, Nintendo 64, Super NES, Genesis, Pico, Nintendo Entertainment System, TurboGrafx-16, Game Boy, Game Gear, Game Boy Color, IBM PC compatibles, and Macintosh.

In addition to its entertainment software portfolio, the company creates serious games and Games for Health, including HopeLab's Re-Mission.

== Games ==
=== GameCube, PlayStation 2 and Xbox ===
- Intellivision Lives!

=== LeapPad ===
- LeapTrack Series 1
- LeapTrack Series 2

=== Game Boy Color ===
- All Star Baseball 2000
- Barbie: Ocean Discovery
- Caterpillar Construction Zone

=== Nintendo 64 ===
- Charlie Blast's Territory
- Elmo's Letter Adventure
- Elmo's Number Journey
- Gex 64: Enter the Gecko
- Rugrats: Scavenger Hunt

=== PlayStation ===
- Battle Stations
- Casper: Friends Around the World
- Crusader: No Remorse
- Elmo's Letter Adventure
- Elmo's Number Journey
- Iron Man and X-O Manowar in Heavy Metal
- The Land Before Time: Return to the Great Valley
- Magic The Gathering: Battlemage

=== Sega Saturn ===
- Battle Stations
- Bug!
- Bug Too!
- Crusader: No Remorse
- Iron Man and X-O Manowar in Heavy Metal
- NBA Live '97
- NBA Live '98

=== Pico ===
- The Berenstain Bears' A School Day
- The Lion King: Adventures at Pride Rock
- Magic Crayons
- Pocahontas
- Ready For Reading and Ready For Math
- Richard Scarry's Busiest Day Ever
- Tails and the Music Maker

=== Super NES ===
- AAAHH!!! Real Monsters
- Beavis and Butt-Head
- Captain America and The Avengers
- Q*Bert 3
- Sküljagger: Revolt of the Westicans
- Socks the Cat Rocks the Hill (unreleased)
- Warlock

=== Game Gear ===
- The Berenstain Bears' Camping Adventure
- BreakThru!
- Captain America and The Avengers
- Frank Thomas Big Hurt Baseball
- NHL Hockey
- Quest for the Shaven Yak Starring Ren Hoëk & Stimpy
- Super Star Wars: Return of the Jedi
- WWF RAW

=== Game Boy ===
- BreakThru!
- Captain America and The Avengers
- Dick Tracy
- Frank Thomas Big Hurt Baseball
- Out of Gas
- Q*bert
- Super Star Wars: Return of the Jedi
- WordZap
- Wordtris
- WWF RAW

=== Genesis ===
- AAAHH!!! Real Monsters
- Barney's Hide & Seek Game
- The Berenstain Bears' Camping Adventure
- Normy's Beach Babe-O-Rama
- Warlock

=== TurboGrafx-16 ===
- Loom

=== Nintendo Entertainment System ===
- Caesar's Palace
- Dick Tracy
- Fun House
- Maniac Mansion
- Monster Truck Rally
- The Rocketeer

=== PC ===
- Bug!
- Bug Too!
- Candy Land Adventure
- Iron Man and X-O Manowar in Heavy Metal
- Magic The Gathering: Battlemage
- Re-Mission
- Toon Jam
- Video Jam

=== Cancelled ===
- Mystics (Nintendo 64)
