= Hopelab =

American nonprofit organization

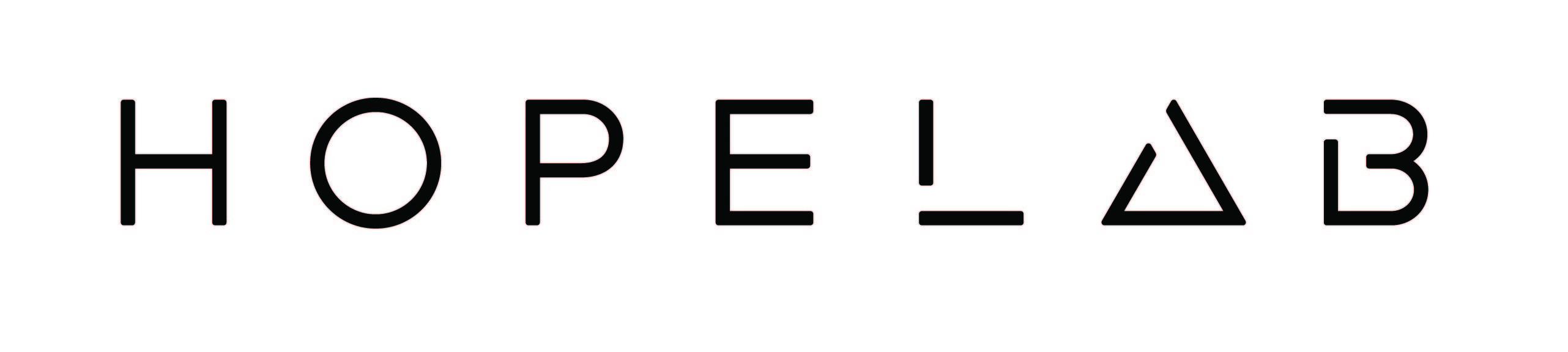
- Type: Non-profit
- Industry: Healthcare
- Founded: 2001
- Headquarters: San Francisco, California, United States
- Area served: Global
- Products: Re-Mission and Re-Mission 2, Zamzee, Mood Meter,
- Revenue: 11,202,444 United States dollar (2022)
- Total assets: 30,347,997 United States dollar (2022)
- Website: hopelab.org

Hopelab is a social innovation lab focused on designing science-based technologies to improve the health and well-being of teens and young adults. They are a 501(c)(3) private operating foundation based in San Francisco, California. The foundation was established in 2001 by Pam Omidyar and is part of the Omidyar Group of philanthropic enterprises.

The organization's aim is to improve health outcomes for young people with cancer (Re-Mission), they also work to encourage childhood physical activity (Zamzee), design family-strengthening tools for young mothers and their babies, and help teenagers cultivate emotion-regulating strategies and skills.

Hopelab works closely with academic researchers, design firms, and healthcare systems, and has developed an approach that combines behavioral psychology with socially aware design.

== Products ==
=== Zamzee ===
Zamzee is a game-based product prototyped and tested by Hopelab as a tool to motivate children, families and groups to be more physically active. The product combines an activity tracker that records physical activity and a motivational website where activity is rewarded with points and prizes. Data from a randomized, controlled study conducted by Hopelab, with support from the Robert Wood Johnson Foundation, showed that middle-school children using Zamzee boosted their physical activity levels by 59% compared to a control group. The study also showed significant increases in physical activity for at-risk groups, including a 103% increase among girls and 27% increase among overweight participants. Other outcomes included positive impacts on LDL cholesterol and glycated hemoglobin, key biomarkers for heart disease and type 2 diabetes. These results were announced at the 2012 Obesity Society annual meeting in San Antonio, Texas.

To begin its development of physical activity interventions, Hopelab, in partnership with the Robert Wood Johnson Foundation's Pioneer Portfolio launched an online competition called Ruckus Nation on September 18, 2007. The competition was structured as a form of crowdsourcing, and its objective was to generate ideas for products that will encourage children ages 11–14 to be more physically active. The competition was international in scope, open to people of all ages, with a total prize purse of more than 300,000 USD awarded to winners across four competition categories. More than 1,142 people registered to compete, and 429 ideas were submitted by teams representing 37 countries and 41 U.S. states. Contestants ranged in age from 6 to 82 years of age. Semifinalist teams were announced March 10, 2008. On March 17, 2008, 10 category winners, one grand prize winner, and one grand prize honorable mention were announced at an event at the de Young Museum of Fine Arts in San Francisco, California.

In 2010 Hopelab launched Zamzee Co., a for-profit enterprise with a social mission to get kids and families moving more. Hopelab provided seed funding to the enterprise by way of a program-related equity investment of $1 million. Zamzee Co.'s objective was to market and conduct ongoing development of the Zamzee product, introducing features like Zamzee Family View and Zamzee for Groups.

In 2015, Zamzee was acquired by Welltok, developers of the CaféWell Health Optimization Platform. As part of Welltok, Zamzee will continue to help kids and families lead healthier, more active lives.

=== Re-Mission ===
Hopelab's first product is the Re-Mission video game for teens and young adults with cancer. Released on April 3, 2006, the game is a Microsoft Windows based third-person shooter based in the serious games genre. The game was conceived by Pam Omidyar and designed based on Hopelab research, direct input from young cancer patients and oncology doctors and nurses, and game developer Realtime Associates, among others. The game was designed to engage young cancer patients through entertaining game play while impacting specific psychological and behavioral outcomes associated with successful cancer treatment.

Hopelab conducted an international, multicenter randomized controlled trial to gauge the efficacy of Re-Mission as it relates to compliance with prescribed chemotherapy and antibiotic treatments, cancer-related knowledge, and self-efficacy. The study enrolled 375 cancer patients aged 13–29 at 34 medical centers in the United States, Canada, and Australia. Subjects received either computers pre-loaded with a popular commercial video game (the control group) or computers preloaded with the same control game plus Re-Mission. Study results indicated that playing Re-Mission led to more consistent treatment adherence, faster rate of increase in cancer knowledge, and faster rate of increase in self-efficacy in young cancer patients. These findings were published in August 2008 in the peer-reviewed medical journal Pediatrics. Notably, to ascertain treatment compliance, researches used objective blood tests to measure levels of prescribed chemotherapy in the bodies of study participants rather than subjective self-report questionnaires, and electronic pill-cap monitors were used to determine utilization of prescribed antibiotics. Researchers concluded that a carefully designed video game can have a positive impact on health behavior in young people with chronic illness and that video-game–based interventions may constitute a component of a broader integrative approach to healthcare that synergistically combines rationally targeted biological and behavioral interventions to aid patients in the prevention, detection, treatment, and recovery from disease.

Hopelab conducted additional research to understand the mechanisms of action that make Re-Mission effective. Results of an fMRI study of Re-Mission showing the impact of the game on neurological processes were presented in August 2008 at the 10th International Congress of the Society of Behavioral Medicine. This research informed Hopelab's development of the next version of Re-Mission.

Hopelab makes Re-Mission available at no charge to young people with cancer and their families, as well as oncology healthcare workers and institutions around the world. Copies are also distributed at no charge to others, though donations are accepted. The game is available in English, Spanish, and French. The Re-Mission website also includes an online community where teens and young adults can share information and support each other.

As of June 2013, more than 202,000 copies of Re-Mission have been distributed in 81 countries, placing it among the most successful serious games to date. Hopelab engages organizations and individuals worldwide to facilitate distribution of the game to teens and young adults with cancer. On May 30, 2007, CIGNA HealthCare announced a partnership with Hopelab in which CIGNA distributes copies of Re-Mission to its members at no cost. Hopelab has also partnered with Starlight Children's Foundation and the Entertainment Software Association (ESA) Foundation to distribute Re-Mission.

=== Re-Mission 2 ===
Re-Mission 2, a collection of free online games, is the follow-up to Hopelab's Re-Mission video game, released in 2006. Re-Mission 2 is designed to improve psychological and behavioral outcomes associated with cancer treatment adherence. Each game puts players inside the body to fight cancer with weapons like chemotherapy, antibiotics and the body's natural defenses. Game play parallels real-world strategies used to fight cancer and win. More than 120 young people with cancer participated in the research and development of the games.

Re-Mission 2 applies insights from a brain-imaging study published in 2012 by Hopelab and Stanford University researchers, showing that the Re-Mission video game strongly activates brain circuits involved in positive motivation. This reward-related activation is associated with a shift in attitudes and emotions that helped boost players' adherence to prescribed chemotherapy and antibiotic treatments in a previous study. As a result, each Re-Mission 2 game is designed to boost positive emotion, increase self-efficacy, and shift attitudes toward chemotherapy.

The games are designed specifically for teens and young adults who are at risk of adverse cancer outcomes due to poor treatment adherence. Research on Re-Mission 2 shows that the new games are as effective as the original Re-Mission game in increasing players' self-efficacy, boosting positive emotions and shifting attitudes about chemotherapy.

Re-Mission 2 games are free to play online at re-mission2.org, and Re-Mission 2: Nanobot's Revenge is available for download as a mobile app for iOS and Android devices. The browser-based games and mobile app offer a variety of gameplay styles for young cancer patients who spend time online and on mobile devices.

== Research and publications ==
Research and product development are led by Dr. Jana Haritatos.

Hopelab research and journal articles include:

- Cole, S.W., Yoo, D.J., Knutson, B. (2012). Interactivity and Reward-Related Neural Activation During a Serious Videogame. PLoS ONE
- Tate, R., Haritatos, J., & Cole, S. (2009). Hopelab's Approach to Re-Mission. International Journal of Learning and Media; 1(1), 29-35.
- Kato, P.M., Cole, S.W., Bradlyn, A.S., Pollock, B.H. (2008). A Video Game Improves Behavioral Outcomes in Adolescents and Young Adults With Cancer: A Randomized Trial. Pediatrics, 122, e305-e317.
- Schiffman, J.D., Csongradi, E., & Suzuki, L.K. (2008). Internet use among adolescents and young adults (AYA) with cancer. Pediatric Blood & Cancer, 51(3), 410-415.
- Beale, I.L., Kato, P.M., Marín-Bowling, V.M., Guthrie, N., Cole, S.W. (2007). Improvement in cancer-related knowledge following use of a psychoeducational video game for adolescents and young adults with cancer. Journal of Adolescent Health, 41, 263-270.
- Beale, I.L., Marín-Bowling, V.M., Guthrie, N., Kato, P.M. (2006). Young cancer patients' perceptions of a video game used to promote self-care. International Electronic Journal of Health Education. In press.
- Kato, P.M. & Beale, I. L. (2006). Factors affecting acceptability to young cancer patients of a psychoeducational video game about cancer. Journal of Pediatric Oncology Nursing, 23(5), 269-275.
- Beale, I. L. (2006). Scholarly literature review: Efficacy of psychological interventions for pediatric chronic illness. Journal of Pediatric Psychology, 31(5), 437-451.
- Suzuki, L.K. & Beale, I. L. (2006). Personal web home pages of adolescents with cancer: Self-presentation, information dissemination, and interpersonal connection. Journal of Pediatric Oncology Nursing, 23(3), 152-161.
- Beale, I. L. (2005). Scaffolding and integrated assessment in computer assisted learning (CAL) for children with learning disabilities. Australasian Journal of Educational Technology, 21(2), 173-191.
- Baggott, C., Beale, I.L., Dodd, M.J., & Kato, P.M. (2004). A survey of self-care
- and dependent-care advice given by pediatric oncology nurses*. Journal of Pediatric Oncology Nursing, 21(4), 214-222. *Note: Winner of "The 2004 APON Writing Award"
- Bradlyn, A.S., Kato, P.M., Beale, I.L., & Cole, S.W. (2004). Pediatric oncology professionals' perceptions of information needs of adolescent patients with cancer. Journal of Pediatric Oncology Nursing, 21(6), 335-342.
- Chen, E., Cole, S.W., & Kato, P.M. (2004). A review of empirically supported psychosocial interventions for pain and adherence outcomes in sickle cell disease. Journal of Pediatric Psychology, 29(3), 197-209.
- Suzuki, L.K. & Calzo, J.P. (2004). The search for peer advice in cyberspace: An examination of teen bulletin boards about health and sexuality. Journal of Applied Developmental Psychology, 25(6), 685-698.
- Beale, I.L., Bradlyn, A.S., & Kato, P.M. (2003). Psychoeducational interventions with pediatric cancer patients: Part II. Effects of knowledge and skills training on health-related attitudes and behavior. Journal of Child and Family Studies, 20(4), 385-397.
- Bradlyn, A.S., Beale, I.L., & Kato, P.M. (2003). Psychoeducational interventions with pediatric cancer patients: Part I. Patient information and knowledge. Journal of Child and Family Studies, 12(3), 257-277.
- Suzuki, L.K. & Kato, P.M. (2003). Psychosocial support for patients in pediatric oncology: The influences of parents, schools, peers, and technology. Journal of Pediatric Oncology Nursing, 20(4), 159-174.
- Beale, I.L. (2002). An evaluation model for psychoeducational interventions using interactive multimedia. CyberPsychology and Behavior,5(6), 565-580.

== Articles ==
- "Development of an Accelerometer-Linked Online Intervention System to Promote Physical Activity in Adolescents" PLOS One (May 26, 2015)
- "How Texting Could Save America's Youth" USA Today (March 31, 2015)
- "The Challenge Of Good Intentions At Scale" FastCompany (March 19, 2015)
- "If Sitting Is the New Smoking, How Do We Kick the Habit?" Huffington Post (October 17, 2014)
- "Game developers use entertainment to boost cancer therapy" New Scientist (April 2, 2014)
- "Re-Mission: game sequel lets you blast cancer cells" USA Today (September 19, 2013)
- "Learning to Game Our Way to Better Health" Huffington Post (July 20, 2013)
- "Video Game to Help Kids Fight Cancer" Scientific American (May 13, 2013)
- "Zamzee Interview" KRON News (October 12, 2012)
- "Online game for teens tackles obesity with a bit of fun" The Independent (September 5, 2011)
- "Serious Games aiding young cancer patients" Examiner (June 4, 2011)
- "Health and Videogames" Korea IT Times (March 31, 2010)
- "A Video Game Helping Kids With Cancer" CTV Toronto (August 7, 2008)
- "Video Game Helps Young Cancer Patients Take Meds" Reuters (August 5, 2008)
- "Startup Uses Video Games to Heal Young People" San Francisco Chronicle (August 4, 2008)
- "A Video Game Improves Behavioral Outcomes in Adolescents and Young Adults With Cancer: A Randomized Trial" Pediatrics (August 2008)
- "OMG! Denver Girls Txt It! Game Is Winner" Denver Post (March 30, 2008)
