= Bug! =

1995 video game

- European Saturn cover art
- Developer: Realtime Associates (Note: Windows version developed by Beam Software.)
- Publisher: Sega
- Producers: David Bean; Windows; Ben Palmer
- Designers: Cheryl Harada; Steve Shimizu
- Programmers: Michael Dimambro: Windows; Andrew Lacey; Eddie Retelj; Shane Lontis; Peter Litwiniuk
- Artists: Jeff Cook; Phil Knowles; Windows; Mark Maynard
- Composers: Greg Turner; Windows; Ian Tran
- Platforms: Sega Saturn, Windows
- Release: Saturn: NA: July 1995; EU: September 1995; JP: December 8, 1995; Windows: NA: September 9, 1996; EU: October 24, 1996
- Genre: Platform
- Mode: Single-player

Bug! is a 1995 platform game developed by Realtime Associates and published by Sega for the Sega Saturn. It was also ported to Windows 3.1x and Windows 95 in 1996 by Beam Software. The game is one of the earliest examples of 3D platforming, as well as one of the first platform games released on the Saturn. Character movement is restricted to a track, unlike many games in the genre that allow for unrestricted movement in all directions.

The game centers around Bug, a green bug – and Hollywood actor – who hopes to gain fame by defeating the villainous Queen Cadavra. The game was developed with the titular character being considered a possible mascot for the Saturn. Although Bug! failed to capture consumers' attention, it received positive reviews upon its release, with praise for its graphics and visual effects and criticism for its music and voice acting. It was followed by the sequel Bug Too! in 1996.

== Gameplay ==
Bug in the game's first level, Insectia. From left to right, the interface displays the player's health meter, number of lives, and blue crystals collected.

Bug! is a 3D platform game which revolves around the player safely progressing through various levels. The game is set on "Bug Island" and consists of six worlds made up of three levels each, with each last level culminating in a mandatory boss fight. Enemies come in the form of insects, mollusks, reptiles, amphibians, and arachnids. Enemies are defeated by jumping on them, as well as utilizing power-ups which include damage dealing spittle and electrical strikes. Each level ends when the player jumps on a "Bug Stop", which will then make the player proceed to the next level. Every level contains collectable items: 1-UPs supply the player with an extra life, collecting a heart will restore one hit point to the player whereas Bug Juice will fully replenish it, and a coin will allow the player to take part in a bonus round whereby they are given the chance to win more lives. If the player runs out of Bug Juice, they lose a life. The game will end once the player runs out of continues.

Collectable items in the form of blue crystals are found scattered throughout the game's levels. If the player collects 100 of them, they will earn an extra life along with a dragonfly icon, in which three icons are needed for the player to take part in a special bonus round involving a dragonfly ring chase. In addition, the player can collect power ups which will enable them to defeat enemies instantly. These come in the form of "spit" and "zap" attacks; the former allows Bug to fire missiles made out of saliva, and the latter unleashes a bolt of electricity. The levels featured in Bug! are linear – the player may only move in four directions despite the game appearing in full 3D. In addition to walking on a grid axis, the player-character can also walk up walls and upside down.

== Plot ==
The game's plot centers around the titular character, Bug, who is a Hollywood actor hoping to make his "biggest break". Bug decides to sign up for the lead role in an upcoming action film, in which his family - composed of his pet, Maggot Dog, his younger brother, his girlfriend, his mother and his father - is captured by the villainous spider Queen Cadavra and must set out to rescue them.

After traversing through insect infested grasslands, a reptile ruled desert, a dangerous swamp, the bottom of the sea, a frozen tundra wasteland, and a volcanic mountain; he rescues his family one by one, defeating those Queen Cadarva left to hold them before facing the spider queen herself. Despite it being part of a movie, Cadarva was an actual villain who was aiming to take Bug out for real, even bringing in real monsters to aid her (a cybernetically-enhanced snail, a giant reptile, a deadly sea snake, a monstrous octopus, and an abominable snow-bug). After a fierce fight, Bug manages to defeat her by pushing her into the volcano (revealed to be real) which destroys her. Afterwards, a movie is made of the events (with no one knowing that what happened on it was real) as Bug and his family attend its premiere.

== Development and release ==
Sega of America contracted Realtime Associates to create a Sonic the Hedgehog game for the Sega Saturn's North American launch. When Sega of Japan rejected the use of Sonic, the Bug character, originally from a shelved Sega Genesis game, was chosen instead. Bug! was conceptualized as one of three candidates for mascots for Sega's upcoming Sega Saturn console in 1994. The other candidates were 2.5D platformers Clockwork Knight (which came out shortly before Bug! at the Saturn's North American launch) and Astal, which was released later in 1995. Realtime Associates developed the game using Silicon Graphics workstations, which were then used to pre-render the game's characters and then convert them into sprites – in similar vein to the process used in Donkey Kong Country. According to producer Steve Apour: "Once we were working on Bug!, we'd meet twice a week to talk about gameplay, just to plow through it and decide what the system could do. Some ideas we weren't able to include, such as the 'wait animation' where Bug was going to leap up and come down right in your face."

Bug! was one of the earliest examples of a 3D platforming game. It was also the first platform game to be released on the Saturn in Europe. By the end of 1995, 150,000 copies of Bug! had been sold in the United States, making it the second most popular Saturn game behind Daytona USA. In Europe, "BUG!" was the number one CD game for all platforms (including PC) for two straight weeks. According to Sega, discussions were underway for an animated TV series, though this never materialized. Alliance Communications and animation studio Mainframe Entertainment planned to produce 13 half-hour time slot episodes for the TV series, each of which would consist of three standalone comedic shorts. A sequel, Bug Too!, was released for the Saturn in 1996.

== Reception ==
Reception

Aggregate score
Aggregator	Score
GameRankings	84% (Saturn); 55% (PC)

Review scores
Publication	Score
AllGame	4/5
Computer and Video Games	90%
Edge	6/10
Electronic Gaming Monthly	8.5/10, 8/10, 7/10, 8/10
Famitsu	8/10, 8/10, 8/10, 6/10
Game Informer	9/10
HobbyConsolas	91%
Next Generation	3/5
Entertainment Weekly	A
Maximum	4/5
Sega Saturn Magazine	5/5
CD Player	7/10

Bug! received positive reviews upon release. The Saturn version holds an average score of 84 percent at GameRankings, based on an aggregate of two reviews, whereas the PC version has an average score of 55%, based on an aggregate of two reviews.

The 3D graphics were praised by critics. The four reviewers of Electronic Gaming Monthly all called them impressive, with Sushi-X elaborating that "The cute, high-tech graphics really show off what the Saturn can do." Andy McNamara from Game Informer thought that the game's visuals were its strongest feature, stating that the "amazing" graphics were "perhaps the best part of Bug!". In the same review, Paul Anderson commended the game's pre-rendered bosses and SGI cutscenes. Lee Nutter from the Sega Saturn Magazine felt disappointed that the game was not in true 3D, although he declared that it was a "really smooth and visually stunning" game. Mike Weigand from GamePro praised the game's large and visually detailed levels, whilst asserting the graphics were "excellent". A reviewer from Entertainment Weekly described Bug! as a showcase for the Saturn's "dazzling 3D-style graphics".

Mark Reed of Maximum thought that the game was graphically a "mixed bag", praising the well-defined sprites and animations whilst criticising the backdrops, writing that they looked "often too blocky" and repetitive, although he admitted that it improved in later levels. Neil West from the Next Generation Magazine thought the graphics were "solid", despite recognising that the game was mostly a direct transition from a 2D format into 3D. Chris Broesder of AllGame thought that the graphics added to the overall experience of the game, stating that the characters were colorful and of "cartoon quality", although he noted that some textures were "a bit blocky" when zoomed in on. Amalio Gomez of Hobby Consolas praised the sprite renderings and 3D environments as "beautiful", saying that the game took advantage of the Saturn's power and possibilities.

The game's music and sound effects were praised, although the dialogue was met with criticism. McNamara disliked the voice acting of the Bug character, stating that it was too "Gex-wanta-be". Weigand praised the game's jazz music, vocals, and underscore, although he too disapproved of Bug's annoying and "nasal one-liners". Reed was disappointed with the audio aspect of the game, opining that Saturn's chipset was not used to its full potential as it produced lacklustre music. In addition, Reed believed that Bug's voice samples were "very unfortunate" and irritating. Broesder, however, opined that the sounds add to the game's overall experience and was of high quality, although he felt bothered that the voices repeated themselves "over and over again". Gomez praised the sound effects and music, saying that the music was "intense" and the sound effects increased the "realness" of the player's actions.

Though they said that the levels can be overwhelmingly long, particularly in light of the lack of a save or password feature, the reviewers of Electronic Gaming Monthly were very pleased with the gameplay. Ed Semrad summarized that "Bug! is the type of game that will put the Sega Saturn on top. It controls well and has enough diversity to keep players' interests."

Reception in continental Europe was positive. French magazine Consoles+ awarded Bug! 94%, praising its real-time 3D graphics, labyrinthine levels and unusual platforming design, while noting that its perspective and controls required some adjustment. German magazine MAN!AC gave the game 80 out of 100, praising its use of three-dimensional environments to expand conventional platform-game design, although it was less impressed by its audiovisual presentation and noted that navigating the levels could be demanding.

Italian magazine Console Mania awarded the game 92 out of 100, praising its graphics, playability and longevity and regarding its mixture of traditional platforming and three-dimensional environments as distinctive. Spanish magazine Hobby Consolas gave the game 91 out of 100, praising its varied environments, character animation, accessible gameplay and lasting appeal.

In 1996, GamesMaster ranked the game 58th on their list of the "Top 100 Games of All Time".
