= Laura Molina (artist) =

American artist, musician and actress (born 1957)

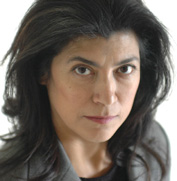
- Born: December 15, 1957 (age 68) Los Angeles, California, U.S.
- Areas: Painter; Writer; Penciller; Inker
- Pseudonyms: The Angriest Woman In The World, La Diabla
- Notable works: Naked Dave; Cihualyaomiquiz, The Jaguar

Laura Molina (born December 15, 1957) is an American artist, musician, and actress from Los Angeles, California. Molina is perhaps best known for her Naked Dave paintings. She is also the creator of Cihualyaomiquiz, The Jaguar, a self-published comic book printed under Molina's own Insurgent Comix imprint.

== Career ==
=== Art career ===
Molina's distinct style is very much influenced by art associated with the Chicano Movement of the 1960s, Mexican culture, especially Frida Kahlo, 20th century Mexican Calendar artist, Jesus Helguera and the British Pre-Raphaelites. Her projects have included the Naked Dave series of paintings and a self-published comic book, "Cihualyaomiquiz, The Jaguar." She was an Artist-in-Residence at Self Help Graphics & Art from 1993 through 1995 and participated in the Screen Print Atelier in 2003 & 2006. "She was a woman with great artistic talent", says Barney Dino.

In 2006, Molina founded Chicano Art Magazine and served as its first Editor-in-Chief.

She has been quoted as saying on her art: "I will use my activism and creativity to end racism, sexism and patriarchy at both a social and interpersonal level. I do not accept a hierarchy of genders because there is no justifiable basis for it and it does not serve me as a woman."

Naked Dave is a series of paintings inspired by her relationship with illustrator and Rocketeer creator, Dave Stevens. A five-month-long sexual relationship between the artists ended in early December 1978 after she miscarried their child at 11 weeks. Molina started the series in 1993 after an attempted reconciliation initiated by Stevens failed to settle things between them.

=== Music career ===
Molina would record with Bob Casale (Bob2) of Devo.

=== Politics ===
She has been involved in the Occupy Movement since October 2011.

Molina ran as a candidate in the 2012 California's 25th congressional district election as a Democrat. However, she withdrew before the primary.

=== Author ===
Molina is currently writing her first novel The Red Moon.

== Exhibitions that included Laura Molina's work ==
- "Chicana Art and Experience: Mujeres con Garbo", AFL-CIO headquarters in Washington, D.C., 2008
- "Latino Artists of Los Angeles- Defining Self and Inspiration", The Millard Sheets Center for the Arts, Los Angeles, California, 2005

== Collections that include Laura Molina's work ==
- Los Angeles County Museum of Art
- California Ethnic and Multicultural Archives, University of California, Santa Barbara
