= Iron Man and X-O Manowar in Heavy Metal =

1996 video game

- Developers: Realtime Associates; Realtime Associates Seattle (handhelds)
- Publisher: Acclaim Entertainment
- Platforms: PlayStation, Sega Saturn, Game Boy, Game Gear, MS-DOS
- Release: WW: 1996; NA: November 14, 1996
- Genre: Action
- Modes: Single-player, multiplayer

Iron Man / X-O Manowar in Heavy Metal is a video game published by Acclaim Entertainment and developed by Realtime Associates for the PlayStation, Sega Saturn, Game Boy, Game Gear, and MS-DOS in 1996. It is a one or two-player side-scrolling action game in which the player battles villains from Marvel Comics' Iron Man and Valiant Comics' X-O Manowar comic book series. It was met with negative reviews which criticized it for dull gameplay and outdated graphics.

== Plot ==
The storyline is revealed through onscreen text. Iron Man and X-O Manowar must team up in order to stop a team of supervillains from grabbing the lost fragments of the Cosmic Cube. During the game it is also revealed that the space aliens from whom Aric stole his X-O Manowar armor want it back. The two super heroes battle through several levels to stop the terrorists and their supervillain leaders from trying to rule the universe.

== Gameplay ==
At the start of the game, the player(s) choose to control either Iron Man or X-O Manowar. Both Iron Man and X-O Manowar can jump, punch, shoot an unlimited supply of energy beams (that can be upgraded through icons) and use a limited but replenishable supply of energy to fly. Iron Man can duck while X-O Manowar can block enemy attacks with a shield. At the start of each mission, a computer screen gives the player's objectives.

During the game, players can collect medical icons to restore their health, and other icons to give more fuel, stronger laser blasts and a special icon that allows one mega-blast from a character's armor chestplate. The game also allows the player characters to destroy various gas canisters, metal wiring and control panels to locate more icons, deactivate certain weapons, or advance in the game.

Two people can play the game simultaneously in a cooperative manner. Both can play as the same character if desired.

== Ports ==
Atari Corporation and Acclaim announced a partnership in March 1995 that included plans to release three game for the Jaguar. Five months after this announcement, a conversion of Iron Man and X-O Manowar in Heavy Metal for the Atari Jaguar CD was licensed to Atari Corp. The port was slated for an April/Q2 1996 release, but work on the port was discontinued sometime in 1995 and it was never released.

The Game Boy version was developed by Griptonite Games.

== Reception ==
Reception

Review scores
Publication	Score
Electronic Gaming Monthly	3.75/10 (GG)
EP Daily	3/10 (SAT)
GameSpot	5.2/10 (SAT)
IGN	3/10 (PS1)
Sega Saturn Magazine	33% (SAT)

The four reviewers of Electronic Gaming Monthly praised the animation in the Game Gear version but gave it an otherwise negative assessment, lambasting the poor controls and lack of variety in the levels.

GameSpot, reviewing the Saturn version, said that "every aspect of Heavy Metal is a letdown — the graphics, sound, and gameplay," and concluded that the game "feels as though it was hastily thrown together. The result is a game that could have easily used another six months of development. People looking for a good action scroller should look elsewhere." Lee Nutter of Sega Saturn Magazine commented that while the two playable characters have varying abilities yet are evenly matched, giving the game replay value, the action is extremely repetitive, the music is poor, and the graphics are barely above what consoles of the previous generation were capable of. Covering the PlayStation version, IGN criticized the characters for being "interchangeable" and concluded: "It's just boring. The control is as sluggish as it gets, and the graphics, while decent enough for a 2D side-scroller, just aren't up to 32-bit standards." GamePro called it "an apt, enjoyable, but not terribly complex, game." The reviewer praised both the action and platform jumping, the rendered player characters, and "simple, clean backgrounds", though he criticized the music and sounds.

== Legacy ==
The video game was adapted into a 2 issue comic book crossover featuring the two heroes teaming up to save the world.
