= Sküljagger: Revolt of the Westicans =

1992 video game

- Developer: Realtime Associates
- Publisher: ASC Games
- Producer: Dave Warhol
- Programmer: Rick Koenig
- Composers: Dave Hayes; Rod Barr
- Platform: Super NES
- Release: NA: October 1992
- Genre: Platform
- Modes: Single-player, multiplayer

Sküljagger: Revolt of the Westicans is a 2D platform game released exclusively in North America for the Super Nintendo Entertainment System in 1992.

== Plot ==
Westica was a nation of free individuals for thousands of years until Sküljagger and his men took over the island in less than a day.

The Kiltish army, led by Captain Lucius Khan Sküljagger, captured the island of Westica; making the citizens into their slaves. They were ruled over with an iron fist. The only day that the people felt free anymore was on Mask Day; where they would dress up in green masks and become invisible to the Kiltish army. Stories about how life was better before Sküljagger arrived proliferated freely on that one day of the year and lifted the morale of the common people of the island for the other days of the year. Storm Jaxon steals Sküljagger's magical sword so that he can free the people of Westica. When Mask Day was cancelled due to the fiasco, the Westicans decided to revolt.

After ten years of mining for gems that made Sküljagger and his crew into rich men, they were ready to take back their nation from their captors.

== Gameplay ==
The player is about to confront one of the minor enemies in the game; an armored soldier with a rifle.

The video game includes a storybook-style, 80-page instruction manual that provides clues about secrets and hidden areas in the game.

The player must advance within a strict time limit or automatically lose a life in the process. Bubblegum permits players to fly and jump higher than normal. There is even a practice mode that allows the use of the bubblegum power-ups without the threat of enemies or bottomless pits to kill the player's character. Jewels allow for beneficial effects like adding seconds to the game clock, an extra life, extra protection against enemy attacks, in addition to the unlimited usage of projectile attacks with the magical sword. Having a mask makes the player completely invincible for a short period of time. Without any gems to protect the character, the player loses a life in one hit. In the two-player game, each player alternates turns.

A password system is available to resume gameplay from later levels.

== Reception ==
Wizard gave the game a mixed review. They commented that the inclusion of an illustrated storybook is an inspired way to get gamers to read, and helps establish a strong connection between the player and the protagonist, but that the number of secrets embedded in the game and the storybook is excessive. They praised the "intense" backgrounds, but felt the character graphics and animation were lacking. They concluded Sküljagger to be "an interesting game that could have used a little more work ... definitely worth a look-see."

Entertainment Weekly wrote that "Parents who fret that their Nintendo-addicted kids never pick up a book should rush out to buy Sküljagger, which requires players to browse through a lengthy well-written adventure tale (included with the cartridge) in order to complete the game."

GameCola offered the game a score of 56% while Digital Press gave it a score of 40%.
