= Bug Too! =

1996 video game

- PAL Saturn cover art
- Developers: Realtime Associates; SegaSoft
- Publisher: Sega
- Platforms: Sega Saturn, Windows
- Release: Saturn: NA: December 6, 1996; PAL: April 24, 1997; Windows: NA: December 10, 1996; PAL: June 1997
- Genres: Action, platform
- Modes: Single-player, multiplayer

Bug Too! is a platform game developed by Realtime Associates and SegaSoft. It is the sequel to Bug!, which was developed and published by Realtime Associates and Sega. It was first released for the Sega Saturn on December 6, 1996, in North America. It was later ported to Windows devices on December 10 of the same year in both North America and PAL regions. Finally, it was released in PAL regions for the Sega Saturn on April 24, 1997. Players are given the option of choosing from Bug, Maggot Dog, or Super Fly, a trio of action movie stars, who must proceed through a series of levels across multiple zones, with a boss level at the end of each zone.

Bug Too! received mixed reviews, holding an average of 71% on Game Rankings.

== Gameplay ==
Players can play as Bug, Maggot Dog, or Super Fly, all big-name action film stars, with the premise being that they were signed up to do a six-picture deal that they must complete all in one day. The player character must make his way through all the levels in each zone, with a boss level at the end of each zone. Bug Too! has 3D levels, which take the side-view and tweak it. Bug can walk sideways up vertical surfaces and even upside down.

Unlike the original Bug!, Bug Too! has a run button. The two-player mode allows players to alternate playing the game and compete for high scores.

When the player finishes a stage with at least 100 crystals collected, they are sent to one of several bonus stages. If the player collects a bonus stage's requisite number of Oscars, they earn an extra life.

== Release ==
It was first released on the Sega Saturn on December 6, 1996, in North America, then ported to Microsoft Windows on December 10, 1996, in North America and in June 1997 in PAL regions. It later got released on the Saturn in PAL regions on April 24, 1997.

== Development ==
Bug Too! was developed by both Realtime Associates and SegaSoft, the former of which developed its predecessor, Bug!. When designing Bug Too!, the design team had to decide whether they wanted to build on the code of its predecessor or if they wanted to switch to using C compiler instead. They ultimately went with C compiler due to it being easier both to use and maintain. It was first revealed at E3 1996.

== Reception ==
Reception

Aggregate score
| Aggregator | Score |
|---|---|
| GameRankings | 71% (SAT) |

Review scores
| Publication | Score |
|---|---|
| AllGame | 2.5/5 (SAT) |
| Electronic Gaming Monthly | 6.5/10, 8.5/10, 7.5/10, 7/10 (SAT) |
| Famitsu | 5/10, 7/10, 5/10, 5/10 (SAT) |
| GameSpot | 4.8/10 (SAT) |
| Next Generation | 2/5 (SAT) |
| Sega Saturn Magazine | 85% (SAT) |

Bug Too! was met with mixed reviews. Critics were generally pleased with the series additions of the run ability and new characters, though some noted that there is little gameplay difference between them and Bug. However, while the graphics in general were praised, critics found the fixed side-view camera created frustrating problems with the gameplay, such as walls obstructing the player's view of Bug and difficulty judging distances when moving between the foreground and background.

The four reviewers of Electronic Gaming Monthly deemed it an overall fun title, though not a must-have. GamePro's Major Mike concluded, "Bug Too! meets the expectations of its predecessor and at times exceeds them. Fans of the first game will definitely want to check it out, and for all you newcomers, it's a great time to get bugged." Lee Nutter of Sega Saturn Magazine similarly stated, "In all, Bug Too! is a top quality platform game surpassing its predecessors in all areas. But to be honest it really is just more of the same which is great if you liked the original. However, those who didn't won't find anything new to tempt them into purchasing it." A reviewer for Next Generation regarded this lack of genuine innovation over the first game to be a particularly strong strike against it, and compared the game unfavorably to contemporary Saturn platformers Nights into Dreams and Sonic 3D Blast. Jeff Gerstmann of GameSpot also compared it unfavorably to Sonic 3D Blast, and remarked, "The choice of films is far hipper than Spot Goes To Hollywood, but the game doesn't play much better."
