= The Rocketeer (NES video game) =

1991 video game

- Cover art
- Developers: Realtime Associates; Ironwind Software
- Publisher: Bandai
- Platform: NES
- Release: NA: May 1991
- Genre: Platform
- Mode: Single-player

The Rocketeer is a 1991 platform game developed by Realtime Associates and Ironwind Software, and published by Bandai for the Nintendo Entertainment System. It is based on the 1991 film of the same name. Another game based on the film was released the following year for the Super Nintendo Entertainment System, and for Personal computer systems.

== Gameplay ==
The game is a two-dimensional side-scrolling platformer that was common to the NES platform during the era in which it was released. The player controls the titular character and loosely follows the plot of the film.
