= Dave Stevens =

American illustrator (1955–2008)

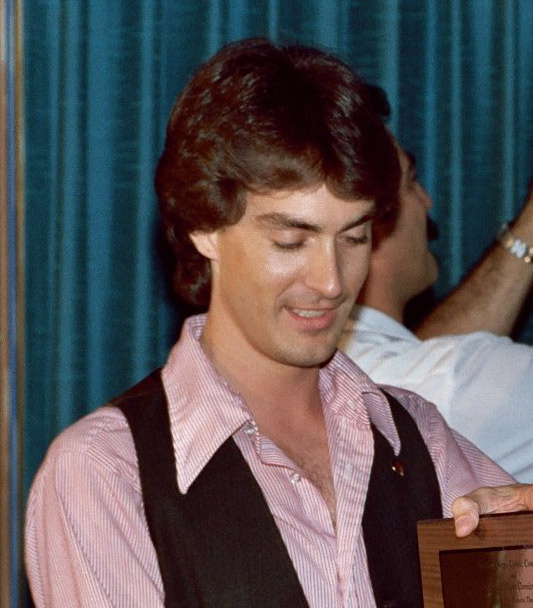
- Dave Stevens at Inkpot Awards in 1982
- Born: July 29, 1955 Lynwood, California, U.S.
- Died: March 11, 2008 (aged 52) Turlock, California, U.S.
- Areas: Penciller, inker, illustrator
- Awards: Russ Manning Award; Inkpot Award; Kirby Award; Inkwell Awards SASRA

Dave Lee Stevens (July 29, 1955 – March 11, 2008) was an American illustrator and comics artist. He was most famous for creating The Rocketeer comic book and film character, and for his pin-up style "glamour art" illustrations, especially of model Bettie Page. He was the first to win Comic-Con International's Russ Manning Most Promising Newcomer Award in 1982, and received both an Inkpot Award and the Kirby Award for Best Graphic Album in 1986.

== Early life ==
Stevens was born July 29, 1955, in Lynwood, California, but grew up in Portland, Oregon. His family relocated to San Diego, where he attended San Diego City College for two years, and attended the then-new annual San Diego Comic-Con (now Comic-Con International).

== Career ==
=== Early work ===
Stevens's first professional comic work was inking Russ Manning's pencils for the Tarzan newspaper comic strip and two European Tarzan graphic novels in 1975; he later assisted Manning on the Star Wars newspaper strip.

He began doing occasional comic book work, including providing illustrations for fanzines (inking drawings by comic book veteran Jack Kirby among them), as well as creating the Aurora feature for Japan's Sanrio Publishing.

Starting in 1977, he drew storyboards for Hanna-Barbera's animated TV shows, including Super Friends and The Godzilla Power Hour, where he worked with comics and animation veteran Doug Wildey. For the rest of the decade, he continued to work in animation and film, joining the art studio of illustrators William Stout and Richard Hescox in Los Angeles, working on projects such as storyboards for George Lucas and Steven Spielberg's Raiders of the Lost Ark and pop singer Michael Jackson's video "Thriller".

=== The Rocketeer ===
Dave Stevens painting for the 1991 Disney film The Rocketeer

The Rocketeer series was an adventure story set in a pulp fiction-styled 1930s (with allusions to heroes like Doc Savage and The Shadow emphasizing the pulp tradition), about a down-on-his-luck pilot named Cliff Secord who finds a mysterious rocket pack. Despite its erratic publishing history, the Rocketeer proved to be one of the first successful features to emerge from the burgeoning independent comics movement. Influenced by Golden Age artists Will Eisner, Lou Fine, Reed Crandall, Maurice Whitman, Frank Frazetta and Wally Wood, Stevens was widely recognized, along with artists such as Steve Rude and Jaime Hernandez, as one of the finest comic book artists of his generation.

Stevens was a longtime admirer of 1950s glamour and pin-up model Bettie Page; he modeled the look of the Rocketeer's girlfriend after her and featured her image in other illustrations too, which helped contribute to the renewed public interest in Page and her modeling career. After discovering that the retired Page was still alive and lived nearby, Stevens became friends with her, providing both personal assistance and helping to arrange financial compensation to her from various publishers for the use of her image and reprints of her many glamor and pin-up photos. Two other characters that show up in the Rocketeer stories were based on personal acquaintances of Stevens: the "Peevy" character, based on cartoonist Doug Wildey, and the sleazy "Marco of Hollywood" character, based on real life glamour and porn photographer Ken Marcus.

==== Comic book series ====
The first comic book featuring the Rocketeer was released in 1982. Those first stories appeared as a second feature in issues #2 and #3 of Mike Grell's Pacific Comics' Starslayer series. For its next two installments, Steven's feature moved to the anthology comic title Pacific Presents #1 and #2. The fourth chapter ended in a cliffhanger that was later concluded in a lone Rocketeer comic released by Eclipse Comics. The character was then continued in the Rocketeer Adventure Magazine, with two issues being published in 1988 and then 1989 by Comico Comics; a third and final issue was published six years later in 1995 by Dark Horse Comics. Stevens's extensive background research and meticulous approach to his illustrations contributed to the long delays between Rocketeer issues. The first completed story line was then collected into a graphic novel by Eclipse Comics, in both trade paperback and hardcover formats, and simply titled The Rocketeer (ISBN 1-56060-088-8); the second story line was collected into a glossy trade paperback graphic novel by Dark Horse called The Rocketeer: Cliff's New York Adventure (ISBN 1-56971-092-9).

IDW Publishing announced a hardcover edition collecting the entire Rocketeer series for the first time, due originally in October 2009. Dave Stevens's The Rocketeer, The Complete Adventures would contain all-new coloring by Laura Martin who was chosen by Dave Stevens before his untimely death. The book finally appeared in December of that year in two separate states: a trade hardcover edition with full color dust jacket and a second, more lavish, deluxe hardcover edition (ISBN 978-1-60010-537-1) of 3,000 copies. The deluxe edition sold out almost immediately upon publication, and IDW announced a second printing.

In 2011, IDW launched an all-new Rocketeer comic book series, illustrated by various artists, called Rocketeer Adventures.

=== Other work ===
Stevens began developing a Rocketeer theatrical film proposal in 1985 and then sold the rights to his character to the Walt Disney Company. After the release of Batman, movie studios rushed to produce similar properties that had not yet been fully greenlit. During this time, Stevens created costume illustrations for The Flash television series which built by Stan Winston Studios. That same year, principal photography commenced on The Rocketeer and the film was released in 1991. It was directed by Joe Johnston and starred Billy Campbell, Jennifer Connelly, Alan Arkin and Timothy Dalton. Stevens was a hands-on co-producer of the film. It received a mixture of highly positive and lukewarm reviews and disappointing domestic ticket sales, ensuring no immediate sequels would follow. Dave Stevens always felt that a majority of the problem was that the studio's movie poster and promotional graphics were over-stylized and vague and didn't convey to people what the film was all about. After the Walt Disney Company purchased the Rocketeer character for film production, comics artist Russ Heath illustrated a promotional film tie-in graphic novel, The Rocketeer: The Official Movie Adaptation, based on their feature film.

Following The Rocketeer, Stevens worked primarily as an illustrator, doing a variety of ink and painted illustrations for book and comic book covers, posters, prints, portfolios, and private commissions, including a number of covers for Comico's Jonny Quest title and a series of eight covers for Eclipse comics, featuring characters such as Airboy and the DNAgents. The Eclipse covers were also published in the form of large posters. Many of his illustrations were in the "good girl art" genre. He also returned to art school to study painting.

Before his death in 2008 from hairy cell leukemia, Stevens was working on a career retrospective collection of his work with editors Arnie and Cathy Fenner titled Brush with Passion – The Life and Art of Dave Stevens. The book was published the same year in a regular hardcover, as well a deluxe slipcased hardcover edition. In addition, very limited signed and leather-bound proof copies were also published, all from Underwood Books.

== Personal life and death ==
In 1980, Stevens married longtime girlfriend Charlene Brinkman, later known as horror film scream queen Brinke Stevens. Their marriage ended in divorce after six months, though she later modeled for Stevens.

Following several years of struggling with uncommon hairy cell leukemia, which caused a gradual reduction in his artistic output, Stevens died on March 11, 2008, in Turlock, California.

== Legacy ==
Stevens's work has had a significant influence on comic book and fantasy illustrators, among them Adam Hughes.

Idealized image of Bettie Page from the October 1986 back cover of Glamour International

Artist Laura Molina, with whom Stevens had a romantic relationship in the late 1970s, used him as the subject of her controversial Naked Dave series of paintings.

On November 3, 2022, Samuel Goldwyn Films announced they acquired distribution rights to the feature-length documentary Dave Stevens: Drawn to Perfection.

== Quotes ==
"Dave had more artistic integrity than anyone I've ever known. He always marched to his own drummer whether it benefited him financially or not. He turned down many lucrative job offers—including a monthly pin-up assignment for Playboy offered by Hugh Hefner as a replacement for their regular Alberto Vargas feature—when they didn't jibe with his own highly personal vision of what he should be doing. As a businessman, Dave often drove his close friends nuts. We'd watch in astonishment at the riches passing him by." – William Stout

"Dave was truly one of the nicest people I have ever met in my life ... and was certainly among the most gifted. Our first encounter was at Jack Kirby's house around 1971 when he came to visit and show Jack some of his work. As I said, Kirby was very encouraging and he urged Dave not to try and draw like anyone else but to follow his own passions. This was advice Dave took to heart, which probably explains why he took so long with every drawing. They were rarely just jobs to Dave. Most of the time, what emerged from his drawing board or easel was a deeply personal effort. He was truly in love with every beautiful woman he drew, at least insofar as the paper versions were concerned." – Mark Evanier

"Well, I do expect a lot of myself. I'm a harsh critic because I know what I'm capable of. I have hit those occasional peaks amongst the valleys, but the peaks are so few—things like genuine flashes of virtuoso brush inking, like I've never executed before or since—I can count on one hand the number of jobs where I've been able to hit that mark. The same with penciling. Sometimes it just flows, but more often than not, it's pure physical and spiritual torment just to get something decent on paper. I often get very discouraged with the whole creative process." – Dave Stevens

== Selected works ==
- The Rocketeer, Eclipse books (1990). ISBN 1-56060-088-8
- Just Teasing, Ursus Imprints (1991). ISBN 0-942681-12-6
- The Rocketeer: Cliff's New York Adventure, Dark Horse (1997). ISBN 1-56971-092-9
- Vamps and Vixens: The Seductive Art of Dave Stevens, Verotik (1998). ISBN 1-885730-10-1
- Dave Stevens: Selected Sketches and Studies, (Vols. 1–4), Bulldog Studios. No ISBN
- Brush with Passion: The Art and Life of Dave Stevens, Underwood Books (2008). ISBN 1-59929-010-3
- Dave Steven's The Rocketeer: The Complete Adventures, IDW Publishing (2010).
