= Barney's Hide & Seek Game =

1993 video game

- Developer: Realtime Associates
- Publisher: Sega
- Designers: Ann Lediaev; Jesse Taylor
- Programmer: Michael Dimambro
- Artists: Darin Hilton; Connie Goldman; Ellen Drucker
- Composer: Eric Swanson
- Platform: Sega Genesis
- Release: NA: 1993
- Genre: Platform
- Mode: Single-player

Barney's Hide & Seek Game is a 1993 licensed edutainment video game developed by Realtime Associates and published by Sega for the Sega Genesis exclusively in North America. It was based on the children's television series Barney & Friends. Educational concepts taught in the game include counting, matching, and problem solving. There is a self-play feature that guides the player to the objective without input from the player.

The voice of Barney was recorded by his original voice actor Bob West, who also did it on the television show. There are more than one hundred words and two hundred phrases spoken by Barney the Dinosaur.

== Gameplay ==
Barney finds one of the kids in a "hide and seek" game.

In this game, the objective is to move Barney around four themed levels and locate four children along with Baby Bop and five presents that are hiding throughout the level. Should the player find all the children including Baby Bop and presents in different levels, they would be rewarded with a "special surprise". During the surprise, the purple balloon pop and confetti and streamers fall from above onto excited children, as well as Barney and Baby Bop. Players are unable to lose in the game, even if they did not retrieve all the objects and find all the missing children in the level.

When nowhere near an object to interact with, Barney can blow kisses in the air complete with flying heart symbols. Locating a child results in giving him or her a hug. Barney can fly on balloons, float on clouds, and jump on nearby platforms. The inability for Barney to die is indicated by his refusal to fall off floating platforms; instead there is a safety lecture handed out by Barney so kids can learn to be careful like him. Cloud jumping is only possible when the traffic light is showing a green signal.

Favorite things are always mentioned by name by Barney when the player helps him discover them. Most of the lines for the game were recorded with the nouns and verbs being fractured, resulting in one-second pauses between non-crucial words and words crucial to gameplay.

== Reception ==
Reception

Review score
Publication	Score
Sega-16	4/10

The game received mixed reviews based on its very simplistic gameplay. Brett Alan Weiss of AllGame gave it a rating of 4/5, stating that the game was "perfectly suited" for its target audience. On the other hand Vince Thornburg of Sega-16 stated that the game "did its purpose of being a simple game for kids, and that’s about it."

== Speedrunning interest ==
The game received attention from the speedrunning community due to its unique self-playing feature. The game will beat itself even if given no input by the player, but random elements cause playthroughs to take different amounts of time despite the lack of player interaction. This prompted the creation of a speedrunning category called "Any% No Controller", in which players do not touch the controller, and instead wait for the game to play itself to completion. Inconsistencies in the hardware seem to make it so the world record of 9 minutes and 9 seconds (as of January 2020) can only be achieved via a physical console, and not on an emulator.
