= Dick Tracy (video game) =

Video game

Dick Tracy patrolling the city (NES version)

Dick Tracy appeared in the following video game tie-ins for the 1990 motion picture:

- The Nintendo Entertainment System and Game Boy games, developed by Realtime Associates and published by Bandai.
- The Genesis and Master System games by Sega.
- A video game (Amiga, Atari ST, Commodore 64, MS-DOS, Amstrad CPC, ZX Spectrum, and GX4000) developed by Titus France and published by Walt Disney Computer Software.
- Dick Tracy: The Crime Solving Adventure, for Amiga and MS-DOS, developed by Distinctive Software and also published by Walt Disney Computer Software.

== NES version ==
NES box art

Bandai released their version of Dick Tracy in August 1990, which was developed by Realtime Associates. The game was loosely based on the comic strip, and not the movie. (Though, the character designs, other than "Breathless" Mahoney, are based on their movie likenesses.) The objective is to solve several mysteries without accusing the wrong person or shooting too many unarmed villains.

Each level starts out with a case to solve and some possible clues. The player drives Tracy's vehicle through the city, avoiding snipers and other cars, to various locations mentioned in the clues, where the action shifts to a side-scrolling adventure game. If the player goes to the right location, he will find, during the course of his side-scrolling fighting, a clue icon that provides additional clues for the case, or the player will be able to speak with a character from the comics who gives clues. There is one car chase in each level. Once the player has collected enough clues, he can drive to the location where the perpetrator is and arrest him. The game will end if Tracy's energy meter is depleted, or if Tracy commits three abuses of power in one case, such as interrogating someone who was not involved or arresting someone without complete evidence.

=== Side-scrolling mode ===
In the side-scrolling mode, Tracy can jump, duck, punch, shoot from his pistol, or collect more powerful weapons (with limited ammo). These include full-auto Tommy guns and tear gas, the latter of which eliminates all on-screen enemies. If the player shoots unarmed crooks, then some life energy is lost. The game provides two ways to restore health. One, if the player is down to half a life point, he can visit one of the police stations and recover an additional half-point. The second requires a "first aid", an icon found in some levels that looks like a heart and is used by pressing B and Select at the same time. The game is considered very difficult to win, but there is a password feature to help players continue at a later time, as the game does not have any extra lives or continues.

== Game Boy version ==
In December 1991, Bandai also released a version of the game for the Game Boy which was also developed by Realtime Associates. The game's introduction shows that Big Boy has escaped from the state penitentiary and kidnapped Tess, Tracy's love interest. The gameplay itself is purely level-based platforming, foregoing the overhead driving sequences of its NES counterpart.

Stylistically, the Game Boy version bears a strong resemblance to the side-scrolling mode of the NES version. Dick Tracy can punch and use the same weapons (hand gun, Tommy gun, tear gas), as well as grenades (which will instantly kill all non-boss enemies on the screen). This game also shares some common music with the NES version. Each of the five levels contains 12 hidden pieces of a photograph used to solve a puzzle at the end of each level.

At the end of each level, Dick Tracy would fight one of the antagonists from the film, including Shoulders, Flattop, and Pruneface. After defeating the boss, the player would need to solve the twelve-piece puzzle using the pieces found throughout the level to reveal a photo of the next boss to be pursued. If the puzzle could be solved within the allotted period of time, the player would be awarded a bonus life. For every two pieces placed correctly, the player would be awarded with one extra hit point. If any of the missing pieces were missed or if the puzzle is not solved in time, then the game will automatically piece the whole image together (without any bonuses, of course). Then, Tracy would interrogate the fallen boss for where to search next for clues leading to Big Boy and Tess.

== MS-DOS and Amiga version ==
Dick Tracy: The Crime Solving Adventure was developed by Distinctive Software and released in 1991 for MS-DOS and Amiga by Walt Disney Software. Players are encouraged to rise through the ranks of the detective bureau by using their detective skills, as well as their arcade prowess, to solve a series of crimes. Those familiar with the movie will recognize an approach to closer famous Warren Betty incarnation of Tracy rather than the square-jawed comic strip caricature. Basic comic strip colors are used. Voice balloons are employed for dialogue. Pointer balloons indicate objects that might otherwise have been obscured.

=== Game elements ===
The first of two major mechanics of gameplay is driving the squad car through the city. Detectives must steer their squad car through traffic, avoiding collisions with other cars. The second of the major gameplay mechanics is shooting out with bad guys. Once the player has stopped a villain in his car (either by pulling him over or colliding with his car and running him off the road) or entered a villain's hideout, he will almost invariably fin himself in a shootout with the villain, who shouts something like, "Eat lead, copper!" once he has shot the villain's strength down to nothing, the villain will surrender, leaving it up to Tracy whether to arrest or interrogate him. All in-game villains are male.

Interrogation plays a major role solving crimes. Tracy will find clues at the crime scene and at various criminal hideouts. Clues must be processed by the crime lab.

=== Game objective ===
The goal of the game is to advance through the four ranks in the detective bureau, which range from detective junior grade to Chief of Detectives

== Sega version ==
Genesis box art

Dick Tracy, released in February 1991 for the Sega Genesis and Master System, was a side-scrolling arcade video game where players control the famous hero through various stages to bring down Big Boy. Tracy can walk, jump, duck, shoot a pistol, and use a Tommy gun to hit enemies and objects in the background. Each level had a series of sub-levels to it and bonus points awarded if the players could avoid hitting any of the various objects in the background; i.e., windows, fire hydrants, and street lights. One of the levels switches the action up slightly by having control Tracy during a police chase. Several of the villains from the comic book appear, and the final battle with Big Boy takes place in a scene similar to the climax of the feature film.

The Sega Genesis version of the game was developed by Sega Technical Institute as their first game while the Master System version was developed by BlueSky Software, based on the 1990 movie for which Sega obtained a license. Sega gave STI five months to complete development, while STI still had only two employees, Mark Cerny and Yutaka Sugano—who had developed Shinobi—on staff. American staff were hired to program the game, and Japanese graphic artist Takeshi Doi worked on the animation. Despite STI's efforts, which included having each character's likeness approved by their actor in the movie—including Warren Beatty, Madonna, and Al Pacino—Dick Tracy did not sell well. The game's late release in February 1991, eight months after the movie debuted in theaters and two months after its home video release, prompted Sega to insist on being a part of movie-based projects at least a year before the film's release date.

== Reviews ==
Reception

Review scores
Publication	Score
AllGame	2/5 (NES)
Computer and Video Games	64% (SMS)
MegaTech	89% (GEN)

David M. Wilson from Computer Gaming World Magazine said that Dick Tracy: The Crime-Solving Adventure offered an interesting blend of action and puzzle, but criticized the arcade action and the limited difficulty. MegaTech reviewed the Sega Genesis version and gave a score of 89% summarizing: "A sort of Shinobi-style game with guns, Dick Tracy is a challenging and addictive action game which should appeal to fans of the movie and game players alike."
