= Jaguar (Insurgent Comix) =

The Jaguar
- Cihualyaomiquiz, The Jaguar pin-up Art by Laura Molina

Publication information
- Publisher: Insurgent Comix
- First appearance: Cihualyaomiquiz, The Jaguar (1996)
- Created by: Laura Molina

In-story information
- Alter ego: Linda Rivera
- Abilities: Peak human strength, agility, speed, endurance, flexibility and reflexes

The Jaguar is a comic book superheroine created by artist Laura Molina and published under her privately owned Insurgent Comix imprint. The character, created in response to California's 1994 passage of proposition 187, made her first appearance in Cihualyaomiquiz, The Jaguar #1 (1996).

The Jaguar's secret identity is that of Linda Rivera, an East Los Angeles law student. Linda lives in an alternate timeline in which proposition 187 has transformed California in to a police state ruled by right-wing fundamentalist groups, which enact the removal of equal employment and affirmative action policies. People of color are consistently denied civil rights while racist hate groups are allowed to proliferate throughout the state. Tired of seeing her people persecuted, Rivera dons the mantle of Cihualyaomiquiz, a term from the Aztec language translated as "Woman ready to die in battle" and becomes a vigilante known as the Jaguar. She is assisted by local activists groups and makes use of her fighting ability, detective skills and knowledge of the law in her pursuit of social justice.

== Publication history ==
Molina first conceived the Jaguar as a response to California's proposition 187 which was designed to deny illegal immigrants social services, health care, and public education. The proposition would later pass with 58.8% of the vote before being overturned by the United States federal court. Molina viewed the proposition as a license to discriminate and a direct attack on human rights, as explained in her 1996 introduction to the character:

Racism is alive and well in California and is becoming overt in the politics of this country. Too many took 187 as a license to discriminate...more people of color are becoming victims of the exploding prison-industrial complex and the corporate culture - creeping into every area of life is leaving us with even less opportunities for free expression. So this book is no corporate sell-out! I intend to use my right to free speech to the fullest.

The Jaguar made her first published appearance in Cihualyaomiquiz, The Jaguar #1, written and illustrated in 1996 by Laura Molina, with Tomás Benitez assisting with additional story editing and dialogue. The series is on hiatus, but Molina promised further installments.

== Fictional character history ==
Shortly after the passing of proposition 187, the rightwing backlash brings a new attack on civil rights, equal employment and affirmative action. Soon politicians are pushing for a national proposition 187. The right wing becomes corrupted by corporate media conglomerates and super rich while racist hate groups begin to grow more vocal and violent. The dignity of minority groups is assaulted on a daily basis with increasing violence against Chicano activist groups.

After witnessing the racist authority of California firsthand, Linda Rivera reclaims her heritage by reuniting with her native history. Adopting the mantle of Cihualyaomiquiz, dedicates her vigilante activities to Huitzilopochtli, the Aztec god of war. Every night she performs an ancient ritual in which copal is lit and calls upon her nahual (spirit guide) to transform into her alter ego as The Jaguar. During one of her first adventures, she is shown to have received important information from an unnamed activist group in order to steal some important legal documents. Along the way she encountered two neo-Nazis in a back alley doing drugs. They attempted to overpower her, but she easily dispatches of the two of them. Before leaving she concludes the altercation by congratulating them for being so lucky, because "after all, my ancestors used to eat their enemies."

== Literary analysis ==
Since the character's debut, the Jaguar has been interpreted and discussed in other forms. One notable example appears in Laura E. Pérez' Chicana Art: The Politics of Spiritual and Aesthetic Altarities, in which the comic book was compared to Art Spiegelman's Maus:

Laura Molina's Jaguar Woman is also partly modeled on the hypersexualized superhero(ine) comic book and animation traditions. In regular life, she is a "scholar of the law" who slips into her animal double persona in order to obtain papers important in her fight against the contemporary California backlash against civil rights and people of color. Racist police and neo-Nazi skinheads are the villains in this comic-book world. The Jaguar's Nahuatl name, "Cihualyaomiquiz." the reader is told, means, "woman ready to die in battle." Linda Rivera prepares to transform into her animal spirit guide, the Jaguar though ritual and prayer. Molina's "Cihualyaomiquiz: the Jaguar" is perhaps closer in its aesthetics and politics to the graphic novels of Art Spiegelman, given the seriousness of the social issues that the format of fantasy allow them both to broach. The repugnant reality of the contemporary California is another commonality between Molina's art and Spiegelman's "Maus" books chronicling his Jewish parents' experience of anti-Semitism in Nazi Germany and his upbringing in the United States in his parents home in the aftermath of those experiences.

== Sources ==
- Pérez, Laura E. (2007). Chicana Art: The Politics of Spiritual and Aesthetic Altarities. ISBN 978-0-8223-3868-0.
- Frederick Luis Aldama (2009): Your Brain on Latino Comics, University of Texas Press, ISBN 978-0-292-71973-6
