= Super Star Wars: Return of the Jedi =

1994 video game

- North American SNES box art
- Developers: LucasArts (SNES); Sculptured Software (SNES); Realtime Associates Seattle (GB/GG)
- Publishers: JVC Musical Industries (SNES); Victor Entertainment (Super Famicom); THQ (Note: Released under the Black Pearl Software brand name on Game Boy and Game Gear)(GB/GG/NA SNES Re-release); LucasArts (Virtual Console)
- Director: Kalani Streicher
- Producer: Kalani Streicher
- Designer: Kalani Streicher
- Programmer: Peter Ward
- Artists: Harrison Fong; Jon Knoles
- Composer: Paul Webb
- Series: Super Star Wars
- Platforms: Super NES, Game Boy, Game Gear
- Release: Super NES: NA: November 1, 1994; EU: March 30, 1995; JP: June 23, 1995; Game Gear: NA: 1995; EU: 1995; Game Boy: NA: November 1995; EU: 1995
- Genre: Action
- Mode: Single-player

Super Star Wars: Return of the Jedi, also known as Super Return of the Jedi, is a 1994 action video game developed by Lucas Arts and Sculptured Software and published by JVC Musical Industries for the Super Nintendo Entertainment System. It is a sequel to Super Star Wars (1992) and Super Star Wars: The Empire Strikes Back (1993) and is based on the 1983 film Return of the Jedi. Ports to the Game Boy and Game Gear were developed by Realtime Associates and published by THQ in 1995. The game was re-released on the Wii Virtual Console in North America on September 7, 2009, and in PAL regions on October 16, 2009, alongside the other games in the Super Star Wars series.

== Plot and gameplay ==
Super Star Wars: Return of the Jedi follows closely the standard set by the previous two Super Star Wars games, with the return of selectable characters (on specific levels), multiple playable characters and Mode 7 quasi-3D vehicle sequences. The controls are identical to the second game, and this installment also includes its predecessor's password save option. It loosely follows the plot of Return of the Jedi, with some added scenes, such as Luke Skywalker having to fight through the Death Star to get to The Emperor. In addition to the standards Luke Skywalker, Han Solo, and Chewbacca, Princess Leia and Wicket appear as playable characters.

Bosses include Jabba the Hutt, the Rancor beast, Darth Vader and The Emperor. Vehicle sequences include the Endor speeder bike chase, and a cruise in the Millennium Falcon. Luke Skywalker no longer has nine Force powers to work with but five and it is easier for him to "recharge" his abilities. He also cannot use any variation of the blaster in this game. Princess Leia is unique in that her appearance and playstyle changes in accordance with the plot. She uses a staff as the bounty hunter Boushh when approaching Jabba's palace, fights with a broken chain as Jabba's escaped slave on his sail barge, and wields a blaster when fighting on Endor as a Rebel leader.

== Release ==
LucasArts released the game simultaneously with their other SNES title Indiana Jones' Greatest Adventures.

In 1996 THQ announced that they would re-release Super Star Wars: The Empire Strikes Back and Super Star Wars: Return of the Jedi in February 1997 in order to coincide with the "Special Edition" of those films appearing in theaters. The re-release is identical to the original version.

== Reception ==
Reception

Aggregate score
Aggregator	Score
GameRankings	83% (SNES)

Review scores
Publication	Score
AllGame	4/5 (GG); 3/5 (GB)
Electronic Gaming Monthly	9/10, 7/10, 7/10, 9/10, 8/10 (SNES)
Famitsu	6/10, 5/10, 6/10, 6/10 (SNES)
Power Unlimited	74% (GB)

On release, GamePro gave the Super NES version a mostly negative review. Though they praised the musical score, they criticized the game for frustrating controls, overly easy bosses, and particularly the level designs, which they said are repetitious and mostly feel like retreads of level designs from the two previous games in the series. In contrast, Electronic Gaming Monthly praised it for the "excellent" graphics and the need to move carefully through the levels.

GamePro found some flaws in the Game Boy version, such as the rudimentary backgrounds, but rated it "one of the year's most fun and challenging handheld games", particularly due to the diverse gameplay offered by the five playable characters. GamePro gave the Game Gear similar praise, and said the graphics are nearly as good as the SNES version's. Power Unlimited gave the Game Boy version a score of 74% writing: "Quality game with long and difficult levels, although the overview on the small screen is sometimes lost. Also a challenge for the experienced platform player."

Super Return of the Jedi was awarded Best Movie-to-Game of 1994 by Electronic Gaming Monthly. EGM and GamePro both named it Best Game Gear Game of 1995. IGN placed the game as number 26 on their Top 100 SNES Games of All Time. They praised the game's additional gameplay variety playing up to five characters compared to its predecessors. In 2018, Complex listed the game #67 on its "The Best Super Nintendo Games of All Time" saying the game is almost as great but not as difficult compared to its predecessors.
