= Aaahh!!! Real Monsters (video game) =

1995 video game

- Developer: Realtime Associates
- Publisher: Viacom New Media
- Producer: Jenny Sward
- Programmers: Andy Hsiung (SNES); Jim Schuler (Genesis)
- Composer: Greg Turner
- Platforms: Genesis, Super NES
- Release: NA: 1995; EU: November 1995
- Genres: Action-adventure, platform
- Mode: Single-player

Aaahh!!! Real Monsters is an action-adventure platform game developed by Realtime Associates and published by Viacom New Media in 1995 for the Sega Genesis and Super Nintendo Entertainment System. It is based on the animated series of the same name on Nickelodeon. The game was rereleased in 2026 as part of the Nickelodeon Splat Pack video game compilation.

== Gameplay ==
Typical gameplay with Ickis, Oblina and Krumm

Playing as Ickis, Oblina, or Krumm, the player explores various locales collecting specific items and scaring specific people the Gromble instructs the player to. The characters start out in the sewer and progress through levels above the human world. Players can switch between each character at will and each has their own special ability that often can be used to solve puzzles or overcome obstacles: Ickis can fly for a short time, Oblina can reach high ledges, and Krumm can scan off-screen areas.

The monsters can also perform team moves, such as stacking on top of one another to reach items normally out of reach. The characters' main weapon is trash, which they can hurl at enemies. Collecting garbage sacks and fish bones gives a limited amount of stronger ammo, triple trash, throwing three pieces of trash at once. Collecting "Monster Manuals" allows them to perform a "scare" which defeats any enemies on screen, spooking them into running for their lives, or taking a certain number of hit points off a boss's health. The goal of the game is to finish all levels and find all the items to pass the exam, including defeating a boss target at the end of the final level above ground, with the final boss being, in most cases, the monsters' sworn enemy, Simon the Monster Hunter.

== Plot ==
In order to graduate from Monster Academy, three young monsters, Ickis, Oblina, and Krumm, must pass their Monster Midterm Exam. This test has them scaring a number of people that their headmaster, the Gromble, instructs them to scare in order to pass the exam.

== Reception ==
Reception

Review scores
Publication	Score
GamePro	9.5/20
HobbyConsolas	78/100
Hyper	74%
M! Games	SMD: 55% SNES: 54%
Mean Machines Sega	61/100
Mega Fun	63%
Nintendo Power	13.9/20
Official Nintendo Magazine	82/100
Player One	85/100
Super Game Power	3.5/5
Super Play	65%
Total!	67/100
Video Games (DE)	65%
VideoGames & Computer Entertainment	6/10
Sega Pro	90/100

Reviewing the Super NES version, Tommy Glide of GamePro called the game "run-of-the-mill platform-hopping". He criticized the level design, choppy scrolling, weak backgrounds, and stiff controls, and found the high-quality music and sounds to be the one positive note.
