= Battle Stations (1997 video game) =

1997 video game

- Developer: Realtime Associates
- Publisher: Electronic Arts
- Platforms: PlayStation; Sega Saturn
- Release: NA: May 21, 1997; EU: May 1997
- Genre: Strategy
- Modes: Single-player, multiplayer

Battle Stations is a video game developed by Realtime Associates and published by Electronic Arts for the PlayStation and Sega Saturn in 1997. It was labeled as "a 32-bit upgrade to the Intellivision classic Sea Battle".

== Reception ==
Reception

Aggregate score
Aggregator	Score
GameRankings	55%

Review scores
Publication	Score
AllGame	(Saturn) 3/5
CNET Gamecenter	2/10
Electronic Gaming Monthly	2.875/10
Game Informer	6.75/10
GamePro	3.5/5 (Note: GamePro gave the PlayStation version two 4.5/5 scores for graphics and sound, and two 3.5/5 scores for control and overall fun factor.)
GameSpot	6/10
IGN	6/10
Next Generation	2/5

The PlayStation version received mixed reviews. Next Generation said, "As much fun as it can be, [the game's] depth just doesn't measure up to even its low-res ancestor over the long haul."
