= Magic The Gathering: Battlemage =

- PlayStation cover art
- Developer: Realtime Associates
- Publisher: Acclaim Entertainment
- Platforms: Microsoft Windows, PlayStation
- Release: November 1, 1996
- Genre: Real time strategy

Magic: The Gathering: BattleMage is a real time strategy game published in January 1997 by Acclaim for both PCs and PlayStation. It was also in development for the Sega Saturn, but this version was cancelled in mid-1997.

== Gameplay ==
In addition to the real time strategy game, BattleMage has a head-to-head mode. It is set on the continent of Corondor, where a planeswalker named Ravidel forces the most powerful mages to fight each other, so that he can eventually destroy them and conquer the land.

== Rights ==
Spectrum Holobyte filed a lawsuit after Acclaim published the PC version in January 1997, claiming Acclaim had violated an agreement the two companies made in November 1996 which established a release schedule for the game, with the two companies publishing it for different platforms. In October 2018, the game's rights were acquired by Canadian production company Liquid Media Group along with other titles originally owned by Acclaim Entertainment.

== Reception ==
Critical response to the game were mostly negative, with reviewers criticizing that it bears no resemblance to the card game in either structure or spirit, and is unfairly difficult due to the AI opponent's ability to act instantly while human players are slowed by the complicated interface. Electronic Gaming Monthly's reviewers found the game confusing and graphically unimpressive, and said it would appeal to fans of the card game only.
