= Re-Mission =

2006 video game

- Cover art
- Developer: Realtime Associates, Inc.
- Publisher: HopeLab
- Platform: Windows
- Release: April 3, 2006
- Genres: Third-person shooters, serious games
- Modes: Single player, multiplayer

The Re-Mission games for young cancer patients were conceived by Pam Omidyar and designed based research by the nonprofit HopeLab Foundation, with direct input from young cancer patients and oncology doctors and nurses, and game developer Realtime Associates, among others. The games engage young cancer patients through entertaining game play while impacting specific psychological and behavioral outcomes associated with successful cancer treatment. HopeLab has made Re-Mission games available at no charge to young people with cancer and their families, as well as oncology healthcare workers and institutions around the world.

== Re-Mission ==
The original Re-Mission game was released in 2006 as a Microsoft Windows based third-person shooter based in the serious games genre. In Re-Mission, the player controls an RX5-E ("Roxxi") nanobot who is designed to be injected into the human body and fight particular types of cancer and related infections such as non-Hodgkin lymphoma and leukemia, at a cellular level. The player must also monitor patient health and report any symptoms back to Dr. West (the in-game doctor and project leader). Each of the 20 levels is designed to inform the patient on a variety of treatments, how they function, and the importance of maintaining strict adherence to those treatments. Various "weapons" are used, such as the Chemoblaster, Radiation Gun, and antibiotic rocket.

Copies of Re-Mission were distributed at no charge to others, though donations were accepted. As of 2012, more than 200,000 copies of Re-Mission had been distributed in 81 countries, placing it among the most successful serious games to date. HopeLab engaged organizations and individuals worldwide to facilitate distribution of the game to teens and young adults with cancer. On May 30, 2007, Cigna HealthCare announced a partnership with HopeLab in which Cigna distributes copies of Re-Mission to its members at no cost. HopeLab has also partnered with Starlight Children's Foundation and the ESA Foundation to distribute Re-Mission.

== Re-Mission 2 ==
Re-Mission 2 is the 2013 follow-up to the original game. A collection of free online games, Re-Mission 2 is designed to improve psychological and behavioral outcomes associated with cancer treatment adherence. Each game puts players inside the body to fight cancer with weapons like chemotherapy, antibiotics and the body's natural defenses. Game play parallels real-world strategies used to fight cancer and win. More than 120 young people with cancer participated in the research and development of the games.

Re-Mission 2 applies insights from a brain-imaging study published in 2012 by HopeLab and Stanford University researchers, showing that the Re-Mission video game strongly activates brain circuits involved in positive motivation. This reward-related activation is associated with a shift in attitudes and emotions that helped boost players' adherence to prescribed chemotherapy and antibiotic treatments in a previous study. As a result, each Re-Mission 2 game is designed to boost positive emotion, increase self-efficacy, and shift attitudes toward chemotherapy.

Each Re-Mission 2 game puts players inside the body to defeat cancer, using weapons like chemotherapy, antibiotics and the body's immune cells. The games are designed specifically for teens and young adults who are at risk of adverse cancer outcomes due to poor treatment adherence. Research on Re-Mission 2 shows that the new games are as effective as the original Re-Mission game in increasing players' self-efficacy, boosting positive emotions and shifting attitudes about chemotherapy. Re-Mission 2 games are free to play online at re-mission2.org, and Re-Mission 2: Nanobot's Revenge is available for download as a mobile app for iOS and Android devices. The browser-based games and mobile app offer a variety of game play styles for young cancer patients who spend time online and on mobile devices.

== Research ==
HopeLab conducted an international, multicenter randomized controlled trial to gauge the efficacy of Re-Mission as it relates to compliance with prescribed chemotherapy and antibiotic treatments, cancer-related knowledge, and self-efficacy. The study enrolled 375 cancer patients aged 13–29 at 34 medical centers in the United States, Canada and Australia. Subjects received either computers pre-loaded with a popular commercial video game (the control group) or computers preloaded with the same control game plus Re-Mission. Study results indicated that playing Re-Mission led to more consistent treatment adherence, faster rate of increase in cancer knowledge, and faster rate of increase in self-efficacy in young cancer patients. These findings were published in August 2008 in the peer-reviewed medical journal Pediatrics. Notably, to ascertain treatment compliance, researches used objective blood tests to measure levels of prescribed chemotherapy in the bodies of study participants rather than subjective self-report questionnaires, and electronic pill-cap monitors were used to determine utilization of prescribed antibiotics. Researchers concluded that a carefully designed video game can have a positive impact on health behavior in young people with chronic illness and that video-game–based interventions may constitute a component of a broader integrative approach to healthcare that synergistically combines rationally targeted biological and behavioral interventions to aid patients in the prevention, detection, treatment, and recovery from disease. HopeLab conducted additional research to understand the mechanisms of action that make Re-Mission effective. Results of an fMRI study of Re-Mission showing the impact of the game on neurological processes were presented in August 2008 at the 10th International Congress of the Society of Behavioral Medicine. This research informed HopeLab's development of Re-Mission 2.
