= Mocker (comics) =

The Mocker
- Cover of the Mocker graphic novel.

Publication information
- Publisher: Pacific Comics
- First appearance: Silver Star #2 (Apr. 1983)
- Created by: Steve Ditko

In-story information
- Alter ego: Tyler Rayne
- Abilities: Invisibility and shadow touch

The Mocker is a fictional comic book character by artist Steve Ditko.

== Plot ==
Tyler Rayne was an assistant District Attorney with an uncompromising sense of justice. An investigation into a corrupt Senator Durn (who happened to be his girlfriend Ella's father) turned sour after his first witness was killed and his other witness recanted out of fear, and he ended up framed for corruption and sent to prison. While in prison he was taken under the wing of noted mob boss Ziger, who upon Rayne's release offered him a deal: find out information to help his operation, and he would use his contacts to prove Rayne was innocent all along.

Rayne slinks in and out of the seedy mob underworld using his mysterious powers; unknown to anyone else, he has the power to dim lights around him, and once in the shadows he is nearly invisible even when right in front of them, "mocking their eyes". When making physical contact with someone, he can spread his "darkness" over them, an unpleasant sensation that usually prompts a screaming confession by the time it reaches the victim's eyes.

Bram the hard-nosed cop tries to reconcile his need to have heroes and be heroic with the fact that he has made mistakes and his heroes may have feet of clay. Ziger, who accepts his own evil nature, struggles to understand how Rayne is as powerful and confident as he is, yet doesn't need to be in a position of power. The story and its subplots deal with various contemplations on corruption, redemption, and self-worth, showing the influence of Ditko's fascination with the philosophy of writer Ayn Rand.

== Publication background ==
According to Ditko, he first started working with the concept in 1981, drawing the first ten-page story and working on the breakdowns for the next episode. The page story found its way to Pacific Comics and was published in Jack Kirby's Silver Star #2. Ditko was not aware of this sale and was not pleased with the format. (The story was meant to be magazine size or twice the size of a comic book page, and had been colored when it was meant to be published in black and white.) The original story (restored to black and white) and the others were published in a 1990 graphic novel published by Ditko and longtime partner Robin Snyder.

The originally intended format of the book influences much of its look. Planned to be published in a black and white magazine, the art is a study in various methods of adding texture with pen and ink. The Mocker's special power is signified by squiggly thin lines, various characters have an affinity for pinstripe suits or polka dots, or have distinctive facial hair patterns that display the various skills Ditko had mastered in decades of comic work. The book was never published in magazine size, however, so the sixteen panels per page are slightly cramped.

Much of the dialogue and especially the contents of thought balloons are in sentence fragments. The basic concepts floating around in the characters' minds are tied together with commas, partly to display the characters' confused, unfocused, state, and quite possibly partly due to the economy of space in the small panels.
