= The Rocketeer (character) =

Comic book superhero

- Character art of The Rocketeer, art by Dave Stevens

Publication information
- Publisher: Pacific Comics (1982–1983); Eclipse Comics (1984); Comico (1988–1989); Dark Horse Comics (1995); IDW Publishing (2009–present)
- First appearance: Starslayer #2 (April 1982)
- Created by: Dave Stevens

In-story information
- Alter ego: Cliff Secord
- Species: Human
- Abilities: Above-average hand to hand combatant Excellent athlete Highly skilled pilot and marksman Flight via jetpack

The Rocketeer is a comic book superhero, created by writer/artist Dave Stevens. The character first appeared in 1982 and is an homage to the Saturday matinee serial heroes from the 1930s through the 1950s. The Rocketeer's secret identity is Cliff Secord, a stunt pilot who discovers a mysterious jetpack that allows him to fly. His adventures are set in pre-World War II America, and Stevens gave them a retro, nostalgic feel.

Analogues of pinup diva Bettie Page and fictional pulp characters appear prominently in the series. The character first appeared in publications from Pacific Comics, and would be printed by several other independent companies until 1995. Stevens' meticulous drawing style, perfectionism and careful research gave the various Rocketeer adventures a notoriously slow publishing schedule. Following Stevens' death in 2008, his estate licensed the Rocketeer to IDW Publishing, who have since produced numerous titles starring the character.

The Rocketeer was adapted into the 1991 Walt Disney Pictures film The Rocketeer by director Joe Johnston.

== Creation ==
In 1981 Stevens was largely a jobbing artist, doing fill-in work on various comics as well as working in animation and design. In 1981 he was approached by Steve and Bill Schanes, brothers who had co-founded the independent Pacific Comics (and with whom he was acquainted from being a customer in their comic stores in San Diego) to produce short creator-owned back up features for Mike Grell's Starslayer. An avowed fan of Art Deco and pre-war Americana, Stevens swiftly designed the basic idea of The Rocketeer. A major influence was Republic Pictures film serial character Commando Cody.

== Publication history ==
=== Pacific Comics ===
The cover to the 1985 collected edition of The Rocketeer, art by Dave Stevens.

The Rocketeer's first adventures appeared in 1982 as a backup feature in issues #2 (April) and #3 (June) of Starslayer. The two short stories drew huge positive responses from readers, and the Schanes brothers wanted to commission Stevens to produce a monthly Rocketeer title. However, Stevens was reluctant to give up his other freelancing work for what he felt would be a short-lived title; he also had reservations about his abilities as a writer (a perceived short-falling Stevens would decry throughout his career). Instead, a compromise was reached whereby the character was transferred to Pacific's new anthology showcase comic Pacific Presents, appearing in issues #1 (October 1982) and #2 (April 1983). Stevens enjoyed the work more than he had expected, and resolved to continue The Rocketeer. The Rocketeer's success led to similar titles, including Bruce Jones' Cliff Hanger and Crash Ryan. He would recall being told that titles featuring the Rocketeer sold around 80,000 copies, a solid amount for an independent publisher of the period.

However, due to the delays between the episodes holding up publication, no further installments appeared in the following two issues of Pacific Presents, and the cliffhanger the story had ended on was not resolved before Pacific Comics folded in 1984. The concluding chapter had actually been completed and was slated for inclusion in Pacific Presents #5 when the company went out of business.

Stevens also had to deal with a lawsuit brought about by Marvel Comics, who had featured a gang of super-criminals called 'The Rocketeers' in a 1975 issue of Daredevil. In a 1987 interview with Gary Groth of The Comics Journal, Stevens revealed Marvel's argument revolved entirely around trademarks, the suit claiming that the use of the name was causing confusion between the characters, something he felt was spurious. As a result Stevens refused to change the character's name and fought against the lawsuit for three years. Some years later, a fan sent Stevens a copy of Blast-Off #1, a 1965 Harvey Comics title featuring a Jack Kirby story called The 3 Rocketeers, which he felt only underlined the absurdity of Marvel's legal action. Stevens also felt Marvel's actions were influenced by his decision to turn down an offer to take the series to Marvel-owned Epic Comics following Pacific's demise. He would credit Disney coming onboard for the film adaptation of The Rocketeer with ending Marvel's pursuit. In 2016, Brian Cronin used his 'Comic Book Legends' column for Comic Book Resources to openly ridicule Marvel's actions.

=== Eclipse Comics ===
Like many of the creator-owned titles left without a publisher by Pacific's collapse, Stevens made a deal with California-based publisher Eclipse Comics to complete the storyline. The result was the one-shot Rocketeer Special Edition in November 1984, which concluded the story arc. The comic also included 8 pages of pin-ups by different artists, a sign of Stevens' growing status within the comics industry. The contributors included Gray Morrow, Doug Wildey, Murphy Anderson, and Al Williamson and an introduction by Mark Evanier. The issue was a sales success for Eclipse, and was the 51st bestselling title from a range of stores polled by Amazing Heroes, the second-highest position on the chart for a non-Marvel/DC comic.

Following the publication of this Special Edition, Stevens worked with Eclipse to produce a trade paperback collecting the material produced so far. Stevens revised several pages for the compilation and recolored the story by hand, which was also relettered by Carrie Spiegle. Stevens created additional pages to address what he felt was poor storytelling in the serialized episodes, and was assisted in this endeavor by Jaime Hernandez (who would be credited as 'Hurricane Hernandez'). The album features an introduction from fantasist Harlan Ellison, a fan of the series who had also attempted to intercede in Stevens' dispute with Marvel Comics. The collected edition won "Best Graphic Album" at the 1986 Kirby Awards, beating volumes of Love and Rockets and Nexus.

The collection would go on to become Eclipse's best-selling graphic novel, going through three printings. Eclipse's treatment of the series, which used high-quality over-sized pages printed using Baxter paper stock (8.45 in × 11 in (215 mm × 279 mm), compared to the standard comic book size of 6 5/8 in × 10 1/4 in or 170 mm × 260 mm), led to Stevens signing a deal that would see the company print future collected editions, though none were completed before Eclipse folded in 1994. Eclipse also licensed the material for overseas publication, without Stevens' permission - and without paying him.

=== Comico ===
While Stevens was pleased with the collected edition, he did not enjoy working for Eclipse and searched for a new publisher to produce a sequel story, which he initially envisioned as a six-issue limited series. In August 1986 a deal was announced with Comico, which would see Elaine Lee and Michael Kaluta's Galactic Girl Guides (continued from the Epic Comics title Starstruck) as a back-up, as well as non-fiction articles on aviation pioneers. The new material was planned as two three-issue mini-series, allowing Stevens the time required to create the material, and would run under the title The Rocketeer Adventure Magazine. Stevens chose Comico after being impressed by their production values and willingness to allow flexible deadlines. Comico administrative director Bob Schreck was however forced to clarify that, despite the title, The Rocketeer Adventure Magazine was a comic and not a magazine, noting the name had been chosen by Stevens as a homage to pulp magazines.

Despite being planned for the summer of 1987, the first issue of the title did not appear until July 1988 due to Stevens' detailed approach and the concluding stages of the Marvel lawsuit. Due to the relative lack of money in independent comics at the time, he was also forced to frequently pause the series to produce covers for other series and other freelance assignments. In discussion with Heidi MacDonald of Amazing Heroes, Stevens defended the series' schedule, noting that while he was more than capable of producing a page a day the result "would look like anyone did it." It met with positive reviews and was nominated for 'Best Story or Single Issue' at the second annual Harvey Awards, but lost to Batman: The Killing Joke. Paul De Meo and Danny Bilson, who were working on the screenplay for the film version, would contribute to the writing of the storyline.

Only one more issue — in July 1989, and further delayed when Stevens suffered a car accident — appeared before Comico declared bankruptcy in 1990.

=== Film adaptation ===
Stevens had been quick to realize the potential of The Rocketeer, and had first sold film rights to the character in 1983. The project would finally make it to screen in 1991 under Walt Disney Pictures. Production was beset by shifting creative teams and Disney's desire to turn the property into a marketable family franchise, and Stevens would later consider the film to be The Rocketeer "in name only". One of the most significant changes was the replacement of Betty with an actress character called Jenny, played by Jennifer Connelly; Paul De Meo recalled this was partly informed by Disney wanting to make the film more family friendly, and partly due to not wanting to pay money to Bettie Page for the use of her name.

As part of the promotional onslaught, an official adaptation of the film was made and published as a one-shot by Disney's comic label Hollywood Comics. This was adapted from the script by Peter David, and featured interior artwork by Russ Heath, who was hand-picked by Stevens. Stevens himself provided the cover for the title, while a 3-D comic with a storyline by Ron Kidd was also produced. T.K. Dean awarded The Rocketeer: The Official Movie Adaptation four stars out of five in a review for Amazing Heroes, praising the pace and David's dialogue.

Despite broadly positive critical response, the film under-performed financially and plans to make sequels were scrapped.

=== Dark Horse Comics ===
After Comico's financial troubles, Stevens signed with Dark Horse Comics to publish the third issue of the series. The deal was announced in June 1991; however, it would not be until 1995 that the third and final issue of The Rocketeer Adventure Magazine, featuring the conclusion of "Cliff's New York Adventure", finally appeared. This was partly due to Comico having incorrectly listed the Rocketeer as one of their assets in bankruptcy proceedings. Another setback came in January 1994 when an earthquake struck California, bursting water pipes in Stevens' studio and destroying several completed pages.

Following the conclusion, Stevens lost interest in publishing new Rocketeer material. He grew tired of switching publishers, while finding new avenues for his approach dwindling after the collapse of the direct market after the early 1990s speculator boom period. Dark Horse also had reservations about the comic's high production values allowing the book to be profitable, though the company did produce a collected Rocketeer edition compiling all three issues of the "Cliff's New York Adventure" storyline. Stevens would later pitch a crossover Rocketeer miniseries to DC Comics featuring the Golden Age Superman meeting Cliff in 1938. However, he disliked DC's proposed revisions to the storyline, so he abandoned the idea.

=== IDW Publishing ===
In 2008, Stevens struck a deal with IDW Publishing to produce a collected edition of his Rocketeer work. On February 28, 2009, IDW announced a hardcover collecting the entire series, intended to be published in October 2009. Dave Stevens' The Rocketeer: The Complete Adventures contained new coloring by Laura Martin, who had been chosen by Dave Stevens prior to his death.

== Synopsis ==
In April 1938, Cliff Secord is a small-time pilot at Bigelow's Air Circus, based at the Chaplin Aerodrome near Los Angeles. He discovers a rocket pack hidden by two gangsters fleeing the police in his custom racing plane, the Blind Bulldog. He takes the device to his friend, the avuncular engineer Peevy, who is fascinated by the device and designs a helmet to allow Cliff to direct the rocket pack, which they plan to test. However, their efforts cause Cliff to miss his slot for a barnstorming act at the aerodrome. To cover for him one of Cliff's fellow pilots, the alcoholic Malcolm, takes the plane up but soon has problems. Cliff retrieves the helmet and rocket pack and, after some difficulty, rescues Malcolm before the plane crashes. The dramatic rescue attracts press attention, and while Cliff is able to land without being identified by the crowd, he is captured by a gun-toting heavy. The press name the mysterious hero "the Rocketeer", while Peevy and Cliff's girl Betty search for him. Cliff and his captor are run off the road; he discovers the dead driver was a G-man, and their attackers are Nazi agents hoping to capture the rocket pack for the Fatherland. He is able to escape and is patched up by Betty and Peevy. Aghast at the danger, Betty makes Cliff promise to return the rocket pack to its rightful owner. However, the following day, Bigelow fires Cliff, and Betty is kidnapped by Nazi thugs. Cliff gives chase in the Bulldog, and is able to harry them into crashing; Betty is saved, but the hoods escape and identify Cliff as having the rocket pack.

Without a job and with Betty spending more time trying to launch her modelling career with Hollywood photographer Marco, Cliff becomes downcast until Peevy talks him through the instructions for the rocket engine, which Cliff had not bothered reading, leading to a more successful test. After returning home, he finds two colorful characters waiting for him, representatives of the inventor of the device. Cliff gives them the slip and Peevy is able to smuggle him to the aerodrome. However, when they arrive they find the new experimental Douglas Locust plane has been hijacked; Cliff attempts to clear his name by recovering the Locust, evading the rocket's inventor in the process. The latter gives chase in a Boeing P-26, saving Cliff when the pack runs out of fuel. The pair then work together, with the inventor dropping Cliff onto the aircraft. He overpowers the Nazi pilots and is able to successfully crash-land the Locust. Cliff is hospitalized; on returning to consciousness he finds that Betty has gone to New York City with Marco, who plans to launch her as a model in Europe. Determined to follow her, he recovers the rocket pack and fakes his own death before setting out in the Blind Bulldog to win Betty back.

Marco shows off Betty to his rich New York friends, but she is shaken when she hears of Cliff's apparent death. Cliff, meanwhile, lands in Long Island, meeting his old friend Goose Gander, and begins to search the city's nightclubs for Betty. He is successful but ends up in argument with her after she refuses to return to California, leading to a scuffle with Marco. The latter has Cliff restrained and beaten until he is interrupted by a mysterious figure who identifies himself as Jonas. A bitter Cliff refuses Betty's attempts at reconciliation and sulks, unaware that she has decided against sailing to Europe with Marco and is instead heading back to Los Angeles. Instead, through Goose, he is engaged by Jonas to help break up the activities of a criminal gang in Bowery. The operation pulls him into a murder investigation being carried out by Jonas; the victims are all former circus colleagues of Cliff. Only two members are unaccounted for, the magician Orsino and the gigantic, monstrous strongman, Lothar. Cliff and Goose are able to save Orsino from Lothar, who is killing the troupe in revenge for the accidental death of midget Teena, with whom he had become obsessed. Lothar tries to kill Cliff and Orsini at a funfair on the Boardwalk, but, with help from Jonas, Cliff is able to once again don his Rocketeer outfit and save his friend. Lothar is killed in the process, after which Cliff returns to Los Angeles, where Betty is waiting for him at the Bulldog Cafe.

== Characters ==
- Cliff Secord/The Rocketeer: A headstrong but broadly good-hearted aviator who discovers the rocket pack and embarks on a chaotic career as masked crimefighter the Rocketeer. Cliff was modelled on Stevens himself, partly due to the artist being unable to find a suitable subject. Stevens described the character as flawed, and noted his primary motivation was self-interest rather than altruism.
- Betty: Cliff's girlfriend, and an aspiring celebrity working as a girlie magazine model. Stevens described the character as being in love with Cliff but also ambitious. The character was visually based on 1950s magazine model Bettie Page, of whom Stevens was an avid fan. Several frames of the character are inspired by specific pictorials of Page. He would also draw a fictionalised version of Page for the 1996 Dark Horse Comics one-shot Bettie Page Comics, and eventually become friends with Page, helping make her aware of the commercial value of her image. Stevens' friend William Stout felt Cliff and Betty's tempestuous romance was heavily influenced by the artist's own relationship with model Brinke Stevens.
- Ambrose "Peevy" Peabody: A curmudgeonly aviation engineer and mechanic who helps Cliff at the aerodrome. Despite his reservations over Cliff's frequent acts of idiocy and his general bad-tempered dislike of anyone apart from Betty, he helps the hero out by creating the Rocketeer helmet and actually reading the directions for operation of the rocket pack, a step neglected by Cliff himself. Both Peevy's appearance and personality were modelled on artist Doug Wildey, an acquaintance of Stevens.
- Marco of Hollywood: A sleazy glamor photographer who plans to make a fortune by exploiting Betty's looks, figure and willingness to do nearly anything for stardom. His career in exploitation has earned him the enmity of Jonas, who also implies that the pornographer's real name is Markovitch. He was reputedly modelled on Ken Marcus.
- The inventor: An ace pilot who created the rocket pack. While irritated by the complications Secord's actions cause to his attempts to recover the invention, he is broadly sympathetic and supportive to the young aviator and quickly realises he is no traitor. Peevy incorrectly guesses his real identity to be Howard Hughes (who was adapted as the pack's creator in the film adaptation). The character was based on pulp magazine hero Doc Savage, but to avoid possible legal action the character was unnamed and only seen wearing a flying helmet.
- Colonel May and "Fancy-Pants": The inventor's private investigators and general enforcers. May is a fast-tempered, almost simian but good-hearted thug; his unnamed colleague is a prim, proper and well-dressed gentleman. Peevy misidentifies them as Hughes' bodyguards Colonel Mayberg and Noah Dietrich, much to May's amusement. In further reference to Doc Savage, Stevens modelled them on the Man of Bronze's assistants Ham Brooks and Monk Mayfair.
- "Goose" Gander: A New York-based pilot and childhood friend of Cliff's, Gander is an inveterate joker and a talented autogyro flier.
- Jonas: A mysterious high society gentleman who wages a private war on crime and sleaze in New York City. Stevens modelled the character on pulp hero The Shadow, who at the time had recently been revived by DC Comics.
- Lothar: A gigantic former circus colleague of Secord's. Lothar harboured a crush on troupe midget Teena, who was in turn in love with Cliff and drowned covering for his dalliance with an acrobat. In the decade since Lothar has murdered most of the other members of the troupe, using his inhuman strength to bend them in half. The character's craggy features were modelled on actor Rondo Hatton.
- Millie: The proprietor of the Bulldog Cafe, a dog-shaped café and diner frequented by the Chaplin Aerodrome pilots, and occasional sympathetic ear to Cliff's self-inflicted woes.

== Collected editions ==
Title	ISBN	Publisher	Release date	Contents
The Rocketeer	0913035068	Eclipse Comics	July 1985	Material from Starslayer #2-3, Pacific Comics Presents #1-2 and Rocketeer Special Edition #1.
The Rocketeer - Cliff's New York Adventure	9781569710920	Dark Horse Comics	September 1996	Material from The Rocketeer Adventure Magazine #1-3
The Rocketeer - The Complete Adventures	9781600105388	IDW Publishing	October 2009	Material from Starslayer #2-3, Pacific Comics Presents #1-2, Rocketeer Special Edition #1 and The Rocketeer Adventure Magazine #1-3

== Licensed titles ==
Following Stevens' death, IDW began publishing additional Rocketeer comics by a variety of creators. The first was anthology limited series The Rocketeer Adventurers in 2011, featuring story contributions from creators Mike Allred, John Arcudi, Kurt Busiek, John Cassaday, Darwyn Cooke, Tommy Lee Edwards, Lowell Francis, Dave Gibbons, Gene Ha, Scott Hampton, Mike Kaluta, Joe R. Lansdale, Brendan McCarthy, Ryan Sook, Bruce Timm, Mark Waid and Chris Weston, as well as Jonathan Ross. A second four-issue mini series appeared the following year, featuring work from Kyle Baker, John Byrne, David Lapham, Sandy Plunkett, Stan Sakai, Bill Sienkiewicz, John K. Snyder III and Chris Sprouse.

In 2013, IDW published two further mini-series - The Rocketeer: Cargo of Doom by Waid and Chris Samnee, and The Rocketeer: Hollywood Horror by Roger Langridge and J. Bone. 2014 saw Waid and Paul Smith create a cross over with The Spirit, The Rocketeer & the Spirit: Pulp Friction, while IDW also published prose anthology The Rocketeer: Jet-Pack Adventures, which included short stories by authors such as Yvonne Navarro, Don Webb, Gregory Frost, Nancy Holder, Nancy A. Collins and others.

IDW planned to reboot the series with a new female lead in the 2018 series The Rocketeer Reborn, but the title was cancelled before any of the material saw print. In January 2023, it was reported that IDW Publishing would publish a one-shot anthology based on an unfinished story by Danny Bilson and Paul De Meo, who wrote the screenplay for the 1991 film.

In November of 2025, IDW announced The Rocketeer: The Island, a miniseries by John Layman and Jacob Edgar adapted from an unfinished Dan Stevens story outline to be published in February 2026, in which Cliff goes on an adventure to find Amelia Earhart. A trailer released in December would reveal he would be accompanied by recent public domain characters Popeye and Tintin on the endeavor.

== In other media ==
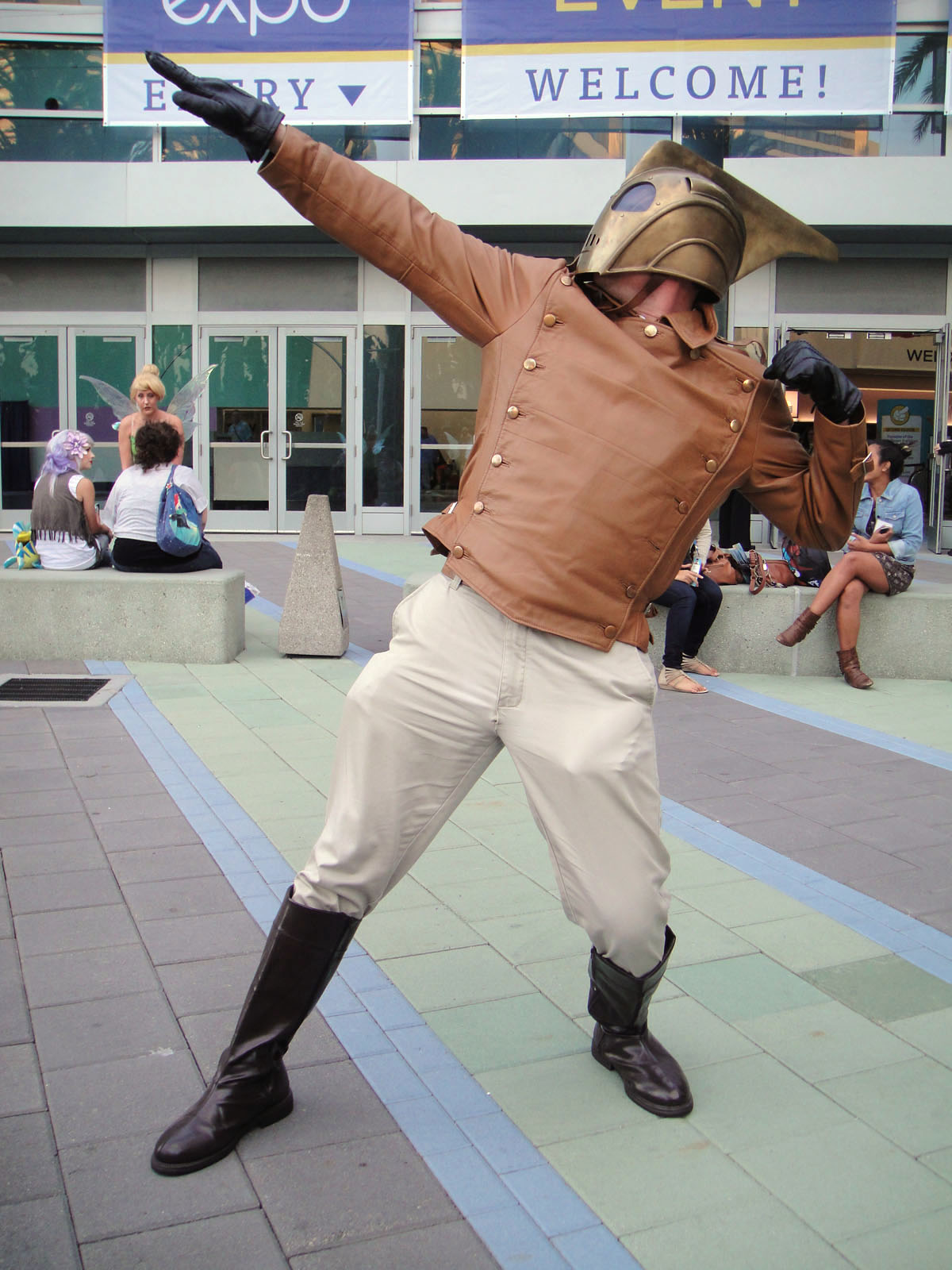
A cosplayer dressed as the Rocketeer at the 2011 D23 Expo

=== Film ===
- The Rocketeer appears in a self-titled film, portrayed by Billy Campbell.
- In 2012, Disney was reportedly considering a remake of the 1991 film.
- In 2021, It was announced that Jessica and David Oyelowo planned to produce a revival titled The Return of the Rocketeer. The film would be written by Ed Ricourt and focus on a retired Tuskegee airman who takes up the Rocketeer mantle.

=== Television ===
- A television series was released on November 8, 2019 on Disney Junior in the United States, and on November 10 on Disney Junior in Canada. The series focuses on a young girl named Kit Secord (voiced by Kitana Turnbull), Cliff's great-granddaughter, who receives the family jetpack for her birthday and uses it to protect the town of Hughesville from various villains.
- The Rocketeer was considered to appear in the What If...? episode "What If... Captain Carter Were the First Avenger?", but was ultimately dropped.

=== Video games ===
- A licensed Rocketeer game was released for the Nintendo Entertainment System in May 1991, to tie in with the film. It is a side-scrolling action game published and developed by Bandai, and followed the plot of the film.
- The Rocketeer appears as a playable character in the mobile game Disney Heroes: Battle Mode.

== Reception and legacy ==
As early as 1985, Amazing Heroes described the series as critically acclaimed. In the same magazine, N.A. Collins praised the character's design, calling the costume "evocative of Doc Savage, Captain Future and Buck Rogers just with one glance". IGN listed the Rocketeer as the 76th Greatest Comic Book Character, stating that the Rocketeer taps into that popular desire to fly. IGN also stated the Rocketeer saga remains a compelling one.

In 1994, Stevens met Bettie Page and showed her The Rocketeer; he recalled she found it "funny and cute". The series has been widely credited as a factor in the revival of interest in Page. Comic artist Adam Hughes credited The Rocketeer as igniting his interest in comics. The character has also been identified as an example of steampunk, dieselpunk, and retrofuturism.
