= Trancers (film series) =

American action-science fiction film series

Trancers is an American action-science fiction film series started in 1984 by Empire Pictures, and continued by Full Moon Features. All but the most recent film star Tim Thomerson as Jack Deth, with the latest using stock footage from previous films.

The series consists of six feature films, one short film and two comic book miniseries.

== Plot ==
Jack Deth is a cop in the 23rd century who travels back in time to 1985 to attempt to stop the creation of Trancers, an army of zombie-like humans for the first three movies. In films 4 and 5, an accident in the time machine causes Deth to be transported to a parallel world, the Land of Orpheus, to continue the fight against Trancers.

== Films ==
Film	Director	Writer(s)	Producer(s)
Trancers (1984)	Charles Band	Danny Bilson and Paul De Meo	Charles Band
Trancers: City of Lost Angels (segment of Pulse Pounders) (1988)	Charles Band	Danny Bilson and Paul De Meo	Charles Band
Trancers II: The Return of Jack Deth (1991)	Charles Band	Charles Band (story) and Jackson Barr	Charles Band
Trancers III: Deth Lives (1992)	C. Courtney Joyner	C. Courtney Joyner	Albert Band
Trancers 4: Jack of Swords (1994)	David Nutter	Peter David	Oana Paunescu and Vlad Paunescu
Trancers 5: Sudden Deth (1994)	David Nutter	Peter David	Oana Paunescu and Vlad Paunescu
Trancers 6 (2002)	Jay Woelfel	C. Courtney Joyner	Johnnie J. Young

== Cast and characters ==
List indicators
- This table shows the principal characters and the actors who have portrayed them throughout the franchise.
- A dark grey cell indicates the character was not in the film, or that the character's presence in the film has not yet been announced.
- A ^{C} indicates a cameo appearance.
- A ^{P} indicates an appearance in onscreen photographs only.
- A ^{A} indicates an appearance in archival footage only.
- A ^{U} indicates an uncredited role.
- A ^{V} indicates a voice-only role.
- A ^{Y} indicates a younger version of the role.

Character	Trancers	Pulse Pounders Trancers: City of Lost Angels	Trancers II: The Return of Jack Deth	Trancers III: Deth Lives	Trancers 4: Jack of Swords	Trancers 5: Sudden Deth	Trancers 6
Character	1984	1988, 2013	1991	1992	1994		2002
Jack Deth	Tim Thomerson	Tim Thomerson	Tim Thomerson	Tim Thomerson	Tim Thomerson	Tim Thomerson	Tim Thomerson^{A} Zette Sullivan (as Jo Deth)
Leena Deth	Helen Hunt	Helen Hunt	Helen Hunt	Helen Hunt			Helen Hunt^{P}
Cmdr. Ruth "Ruthie" Raines	Telma Hopkins	Telma Hopkins	Telma Hopkins	Telma Hopkins	Mentioned		
Police Commissioner "Little" "Baby" McNulty I	Alyson Croft	Alyson Croft	Alyson Croft				
Police Commissioner McNulty II	Art LaFleur	Art LaFleur	Art LaFleur	Mentioned			
Hap Ashby	Biff Manard		Biff Manard	Mentioned			
Detective "Whistler" Weisling	Michael Stefani						
Santa Claus	Pete Schrum						
The Warden		Grace Zabriskie					
Edlin Shock		Velvet Rhodes					
E.D. Wardo			Richard Lynch				
Alice Stillwell-Deth	Mentioned		Megan Ward	Megan Ward	Mentioned	Mentioned	
Harris				Stephen Macht	Stephen Macht	Stephen Macht	
Shark				R. A. Mihailoff	Mentioned		
Colonel Daddy Muthuh				Andrew Robinson			
R.J.				Melanie Smith			
Josephine "Jo Deth" Forrest				Samantha Jordan			Zette Sullivan
Lyra					Stacie Randall	Stacie Randall	
Prospero					Ty Miller	Ty Miller	
Shaleen					Terri Ivens	Terri Ivens	
Lucius					Mark Arnold	Mark Arnold	
Lord Caliban					Clabe Hartley	Clabe Hartley	
Farr					Alan Oppenheimer	Alan Oppenheimer	
Harson					Jeff Moldovan	Jeff Moldovan	
Tessa					Rona Hartner	Rona Hartner	
Angelo					Ion Haiduc	Ion Haiduc	
Shauna Wilder							Jennifer Capo
Dr. Paul Malvern							Robert Donavan
Mr. Castle							Ben Bar

== Merchandising ==
Trancers: The Adventures of Jack Deth – A two-issue comic book limited series written by S. A. Bennett and printed by Eternity Comics in 1991, which featured the tagline "All new adventures based on two hit films!".

Full Moon Presents: Trancers – A three-issue comic book limited series written by Justin Gray and Jimmy Palmiotti, published by Action Lab Comics in 2015.

Trancers II Trading Cards – A set of collectible cards of the characters from Trancers II

Jack Deth action figure – A prototype action figure of Jack Deth was shown at Toy Fair 2000 but was ultimately unproduced.

Dollman Kills the Full Moon Universe – A crossover comic featuring Brick Bardo from Dollman tracking down different Full Moon monsters and villains to kill, published by Full Moon Comix in 2018. Jack Deth appears in the fifth and sixth issues.

== Future ==
Despite the ending of Trancers 6 teasing a sequel, any plans for potential follow-ups were abandoned after Blockbuster passed on the film, a decision that heavily impacted its post-production and release. In September 2009, Tim Thomerson revealed he was in early talks to return for one final Trancers film. In November 2010, Charles Band confirmed Tim Thomerson was on board and the title for the next film would be Trancers 7: Deth in Shanghai. This project never materialized.

In 2023, Charles Band stated in an interview with JoBlo.com that Full Moon had several ideas for reboots and remakes for their franchises, including Trancers, which he hoped to bring back with a TV show on a streaming service. Plans were stalled because of the SAG-AFTRA strike and the status of the series is currently unknown.
