= Trancers 6 =

- DVD cover
- Directed by: Jay Woelfel
- Written by: C. Courtney Joyner (as Gene Yarbrough)
- Produced by: Johnnie J. Young
- Starring: Zette Sullivan; Jennifer Capo; Robert Donavan; Timothy Prindle
- Cinematography: Paul Deng
- Edited by: Jonathan Ammon; Jay Woelfel
- Music by: Jon Greathouse
- Distributed by: Full Moon Entertainment
- Release date: July 23, 2002
- Running time: 88 minutes
- Country: United States
- Language: English

Trancers 6 is a 2002 American science fiction horror film directed by Jay Woelfel and starring Zette Sullivan, Jennifer Capo, Robert Donavan, Timothy Prindle, Jere Jon, Jennifer Cantrell, Ben Bar, James R. Hilton, Kyle O. Ingleman, Gregory Lee Kenyon and Douglas Smith. The film was produced by Johnnie J. Young of Young Wolf Productions. It is the final Installment in the Trancers franchise.

== Synopsis ==
In a return to the original film's premise, Jack Deth is back – traveling back in time and into the body of his own daughter, Josephine (Zette Sullivan), on a mission to save her life and save the world from the most lethal Trancers yet. Jack / Jo must adapt and survive, avoiding many assassination attempts by more powerful and dangerous zombie-like Trancers than he's ever faced before.

== Cast ==
- Zette Sullivan as Josephine Forrest / Jo Deth
- Jennifer Capo as Shauna Wilder
- Robert Donavan as Dr. Paul Malvern
- James R. Hilton as Dr. Jennings
- Timothy Prindle as Mark
- Jere Jon as Sam
- Ben Bar as Mr. Castle
- Robert Rocque as Deputy Mayor
- Cindy Olmscheid as Deputy Mayor's Wife
- Jozo Zovko as Trancer Joe
- Ivona Rocque as Trancer Girl #1
- Sasha Gallardo as Trancer Girl #2
- Carlos Long as Pimp
- Jennifer Cantrell as Jennings' Hooker
- Christopher Farrell as Jack Deth Double (uncredited)
- Tim Thomerson as Jack Deth (archive footage) (uncredited)

== Production ==
In 1995, Paramount Pictures ended its distribution deal with Full Moon Entertainment. Some legal complications arose as a result of the split. While Paramount retained distribution rights to the films it had previously handled, preventing Full Moon from re-releasing any of them, Full Moon retained the rights to produce sequels to those films. Trancers was an exception, as the series had originated at Charles Band’s previous company, Empire International Pictures. Band retained the rights to the first film and the then-unreleased short Trancers: City of Lost Angels, but could not re-release parts 2 through 5. In the late 90s, Band became interested in creating a new Trancers film, as the series was considered the studio’s flagship franchise alongside Subspecies. A sixth Trancers film was first announced in 1999, in Retro Puppet Master's VideoZone.

In 2000, Tim Thomerson began exploring ideas on how to revive the Trancers series. After Full Moon lost subsequent distribution deals with The Kushner-Locke Company and Tempe Entertainment, the company had significantly less money to fund its productions going into the 2000s. As a result, Thomerson attempted to write a film that the Sci-Fi Channel could fund and even considered a TV series. The pitch went poorly, and all discussions about the project ended shortly after. Around this time, Trancers III writer/director C. Courtney Joyner attempted to start scripting a pilot movie for a TV series featuring Jack Deth on a space station, but this attempt was also abandoned, due to lack of investment.

After completing Demonicus, director Jay Woelfel and producer Johnnie Young were offered Trancers 6 by Full Moon Features, leading them to form their own production company: Young Wolf Productions. They joined the project before a script was finalized and helped develop it, hoping to revive the series much like they had attempted with a Battlestar Galactica trailer in 1999. An early idea for the film involved expanding on the then-lost short Trancers: City of Lost Angels. While Charles Band initially seemed interested and claimed to know where the footage was, he never followed up with the crew about it, so the idea was scrapped. C. Courtney Joyner's previous script was too expensive to produce, so a new script was written in less than two weeks, with additional edits made during pre-production to accommodate the low budget. Having worked with Tim Thomerson before on Unseen Evil, Woelfel and Young were eager to bring him back as Jack Deth. However, due to the production being non-union and budget constraints, Thomerson ultimately declined to reprise his role. Still, he remained involved behind the scenes as an uncredited acting advisor. As a result, Jack Deth appears only briefly, using footage from earlier Trancers films and a body double. The film was also mandated by the studio to be a "passing of the torch" to a female lead since it was believed that Tim Thomerson was too old for the leading role, and although Maggie Grace showed interest, union restrictions prevented her casting, with newcomer Zette Sullivan taking the role instead.

Filming began around September 11, 2001, which complicated things for obvious reasons, especially with scenes involving guns in public. In one instance, a scene involving a fire extinguisher led to an anthrax scare. Despite the challenges, the shoot went smoothly, with every crew member, including the director and producer, appearing as extras. Issues arose during post-production. when Blockbuster Video, a major distribution partner at the time, declined to carry the film, claiming they did not want sci-fi movies. In reality, they never watched it, as the screener DVDs sent were accidentally defective and did not contain the film. Reflecting on the situation, Woelfel was reportedly told by Full Moon, "If Blockbuster had told us that up front we never would have made the film."

As a result, Full Moon stopped post-production and released a rough cut with rushed sound, incomplete effects, and no bonus content. Jay Woelfel’s intended version of the film was never completed.

== Release ==
Trancers 6 was released direct to video on VHS in 2002. The film was released on DVD for the first time on Apr 6, 2004 by Shadow Entertainment, both individually and as part of a double feature with the first Trancers.

== Reception ==
Reception for the film has been overall negative, mainly due to the lack of Tim Thomerson.

== Future ==
Despite the ending of the film teasing a sequel, any plans for potential follow-ups were abandoned after Blockbuster passed on the film.

In September 2009, Tim Thomerson revealed that he was in early talks to star in one final Trancers film. In November 2010, Charles Band confirmed Tim Thomerson was on board and revealed the title of the film would be Trancers 7: Deth in Shanghai. This project never materialized.

In 2023, Charles Band revealed in an interview with JoBlo.com that he had some ideas for a potential Trancers TV show that he hoped could be released on a major streaming service. Plans were stalled because of the SAG-AFTRA strike and the status of the series is currently unknown.
