= Trancers: City of Lost Angels =

- DVD cover art
- Directed by: Charles Band
- Written by: Danny Bilson; Paul De Meo
- Produced by: Charles Band
- Starring: Tim Thomerson; Helen Hunt
- Distributed by: Empire Pictures
- Release date: September 2013
- Running time: 20 minutes
- Country: United States
- Language: English

Trancers: City of Lost Angels (also known as Trancers 1.5) is a short science fiction film that was released on DVD in 2013 and later a bonus addition for other releases of the original Trancers on Blu-ray. It consists of approximately 20 minutes of footage lifted from the unreleased 1988 anthology film, Pulse Pounders, which also featured two other segments. It stars Tim Thomerson who reprises his role as the time journeying cop, Jack Deth, from 1985's Trancers. The short is marketed as a digitally restored lost sequel. The short takes place between Trancers and Trancers II.

== Plot ==
Jack Deth, the super cop from the future, has put away three centuries' worth of time traveling criminals. But Deth’s most dangerous collar, the ultraviolent assassin Edlin Shock (Velvet Rhodes), has escaped from her maximum security holding cell and will not rest until she has exacted revenge. Meanwhile, Deth is trying to make a life for himself as a private eye in 1988 Los Angeles with his hot-blooded girlfriend Lena (played by Academy Award-winning actress Helen Hunt). Relationship troubles are just the beginning of Deth’s problems when he learns that Edlin Shock has followed him back in time. Aided by his former police chief McNulty, whose consciousness is inhabiting the body of a 13-year-old girl, Jack Deth will have to use his wits, as well as his fists, to save the past, present and future.

== Cast ==
- Tim Thomerson as Jack Deth
- Alyson Croft as Little McNulty
- Helen Hunt as Leena Deth
- Art LaFleur as McNulty
- Telma Hopkins as Ruthie Raines
- Grace Zabriskie as The Warden
- Velvet Rhodes as Edlin Shock

== Production and release ==
=== Production ===
Trancers: City of Lost Angels was filmed in 1987, intended to be part of the anthology project Pulse Pounders in 1988. Pulse Pounders was never released, as its distributor, Empire International Pictures, shut down in 1988 due to debt issues. The film was shot in ten days across three different sets at Empire Studios in Rome.

=== Release ===
A copy of the film was found and screened at Chicago Flashback Weekend in August 2013. The film was released on DVD on Oct 22, 2013, including a new introduction by Tim Thomerson. The film has since been included as a bonus feature on both the Blu-ray and 4K UHD releases of Trancers and can be streamed on the Full Moon streaming app and Tubi.

== Reception ==
The film was described as a "fast food production that has its charm".
