= Zone Troopers =

- Italian poster
- Directed by: Danny Bilson
- Written by: Danny Bilson; Paul De Meo
- Produced by: Paul De Meo
- Starring: Tim Thomerson; Timothy Van Patten; Art LaFleur; Biff Manard
- Cinematography: Mac Ahlberg
- Edited by: Ted Nicolaou
- Music by: Richard Band
- Production company: Charles Band Productions
- Distributed by: Empire Pictures
- Release date: October 1, 1985
- Running time: 86 minutes
- Country: United States
- Language: English
- Budget: $3.5 million

Zone Troopers is a 1985 American World War II science fiction film directed by Danny Bilson and starring Tim Thomerson. It was filmed in Italy by Empire Pictures with Charles Band as executive producer. The original music score was composed by Richard Band.

== Premise ==
Set in Italy in World War II, four members of an American military patrol, led by their grizzled sergeant (Tim Thomerson), are lost behind enemy lines. They discover an alien spaceship that has crash-landed in the woods, along with its crew. The alien pilot is dead, and one of the aliens has been captured by the Nazis, hampering efforts of the aliens to return home. A larger Nazi unit, with scientific and medical personnel, also investigates the crash, seeking to capture the aliens' technology and use it to win the war. However, the aliens side with the Americans after the Nazis' actions against their crewmember.

== Availability ==
The film was released on videocassette by Lightning Video in 1986. In 2005 Metro-Goldwyn-Mayer issued a widescreen print of the film, which was shown on Showtime, fueling speculation that a DVD release may be possible in the near future.

The film was released on a manufactured-on-demand DVD-R by MGM as part of their Limited Edition Series on December 6, 2011.

The film was released on Region A Blu-ray on July 28, 2015 by Kino Lorber. It features a commentary track by Danny Bilson and Paul De Meo, an interview with Tim Thomerson, and the film's original trailer.

== Development ==
This film reunited a significant portion of the cast and creators of the 1985 film Trancers.

== Cast ==
- Tim Thomerson as Sergeant Patrick Stone
- Timothy Van Patten as Joey Verona
- Art LaFleur as George "Mittens" Minnensky
- William Paulson as Alien
- Peter Boom as Colonel Mannheim
- Max Turili as Sergeant Zeller

== Reception ==
TV Guide found that while "Thomerson [did] a nice job as the sergeant", the movie failed to mesh the war and science fiction genres well and moved at a slow pace. Creature Feature gave the movie 3 out of 5 stars, found that it was gentler than other Charles Band productions, saying the movie was mildly enjoyable and praised the 1940s era sound track. Radio Times compared the film to the earlier movie, Trancers, describing Zone Troopers as a "witty, irreverent, time-travelling adventure [that] also deserves cult classic status."
