= Trancers III =

- Theatrical release poster
- Directed by: C. Courtney Joyner
- Written by: C. Courtney Joyner
- Produced by: Albert Band
- Starring: Tim Thomerson; Melanie Smith
- Cinematography: Adolfo Bartoli
- Edited by: Lauren A. Schaffer, Margeret-Anne Smith
- Music by: Phil Davies; Mark Ryder
- Distributed by: Full Moon Entertainment
- Release date: October 14, 1992
- Running time: 75 minutes
- Country: United States
- Language: English
- Budget: $2,000,000 (est.)

Trancers III (also released as Trancers 3: Deth Lives!) is a 1992 American direct-to-video science fiction action film directed by C. Courtney Joyner. It is the second sequel to Trancers, and also marks Helen Hunt's final appearance in the series.

== Plot ==
Around 1992, Jack Deth (Tim Thomerson) is now a successful private detective, catching cheating lovers in the act. However, Jack's life with Lena (Helen Hunt) has gotten rocky and he faces divorce if he cannot clean up his act. Lena agrees to meet for supper to try fix the relationship.

Before he can mend his troubled relationship, he is jacked back up the line to 2352 by Alice (Megan Ward), to save Angel City from its future destruction in a massive Trancer war. His mission is go to 2005 and find the origin of this new wave of Trancers and end it with extreme prejudice. The only problem is that Lena, now remarried, is the only tie to Angel City's impending doom.

Jack learns that the U.S. government has sponsored a new Trancer training program, run by the maniacal Colonel Daddy Muthuh (Andrew Robinson). With the help of R.J. (Melanie Smith), a camp escapee and Shark (R. A. Mihailoff), a crystal-powered mandroid sent by Ruthie Raines (Telma Hopkins), Deth decides to find a way inside the Trancer program and shut it down for good.

While Lena accepts his explanation of why he missed the dinner, she is happy with her life and asks Deth not to use time travel to go back change history so he is present at the date. Jack returns to 2352.

== Cast ==
- Tim Thomerson as Jack Deth
- Helen Hunt as Lena Deth
- Melanie Smith as R.J.
- Andrew Robinson as Colonel Daddy Muthuh
- Telma Hopkins as Ruthie Raines, The Engineer
- Megan Ward as Alice Stillwell Deth
- Stephen Macht as Harris
- R.A. Mihailoff as "Shark"

== Reception ==
While praising Thomerson performance and finding the special effects impressive for the film's low budget, Entertainment Weekly found the film overall to be needlessly confusing, giving the film a "C" grade.

TV Guide found the movie to be an improvement over the previous sequel, also noting Thomerson's performance. It also praises the writing, direction and effects, but notes a certain misogynic feel as most minor female characters in the film die violent deaths. In total TV Guide recommend the film as an above average example of the genre.

Likewise, The Encyclopedia of Science Fiction found this entry to be superior to the previous sequel.

However, Creature Feature gave the film 2 out of five stars, finding it the least interesting sequel.

== Production ==
After writing Prison for Empire International Pictures in 1987, writer C. Courtney Joyner reunited with producer Charles Band while visiting a friend who was auditioning at his successor company, Full Moon Productions. They struck a deal where Joyner could write three new films for the studio. These were Puppet Master III: Toulon's Revenge, Doctor Mordrid and Trancers III: Deth Lives!. Joyner had expressed interest in possibly directing these films but Band didn't agree, with David DeCoteau directing Puppet Master III and Band co-directing Dr Mordrid with his father, Albert. Band eventually opened up the idea and let Joyner direct Trancers III, partially because Tim Thomerson had expressed interest and started campaigning for him.

Joyner, admittedly not a fan of Trancers II: The Return of Jack Deth, specifically wrote Trancers III to largely ignore its events, with the exception of Jack Deth's two wives, who were too important to the series to remove. There was initial uncertainty if Helen Hunt would return, as she had become a well-known star on Mad About You, although she gladly agreed, stating she was surprised they had considered doing another film without her. Joyner had been a big fan of Megan Ward in the previous film and felt she hadn't reached her full potential, so her role was rewritten as more of an action heroine, similar to Sarah Connor from Terminator.

The film was shot in Los Angeles over the course of three weeks on a budget of $2,000,000.

== Home media ==
Trancers III was released on VHS in 1992, LaserDisc in 1993, DVD in 2010, and Blu-ray in 2016.
