= Trancers II =

- Theatrical release poster
- Directed by: Charles Band
- Screenplay by: Jackson Barr
- Story by: Charles Band; Jackson Barr
- Based on: Characters created by Danny Bilson and Paul De Meo
- Produced by: Charles Band
- Starring: Tim Thomerson; Helen Hunt; Megan Ward; Biff Manard; Martine Beswicke; Jeffrey Combs; Alyson Croft; Art LaFleur; Barbara Crampton; Richard Lynch
- Cinematography: Adolfo Bartoli
- Edited by: Andy Horvitch; Ted Nicolaou
- Music by: Phil Davies; Mark Ryder
- Production company: Full Moon Pictures
- Distributed by: Full Moon Features
- Release date: August 22, 1991
- Running time: 85 minutes
- Country: United States
- Language: English

Trancers II (also released as Trancers II: The Return of Jack Deth) is a 1991 American direct-to-video science fiction action film directed by Charles Band. It is a sequel to Trancers and is set six years after the events of the first.

== Plot ==
Los Angeles, 1991. Jack Deth (Tim Thomerson) has gotten used to life with his wife Lena (Helen Hunt) in the six years since they killed Martin Whistler. Hap Ashby (Biff Manard) has made a fortune investing and has moved from the streets to a palatial estate, sharing it with Jack and Lena.

But life is about to get difficult for Jack. Whistler's brother, Edward (Richard Lynch), has gone back in time - using the alias "E.D. Wardo" - and created a "Trancer farm" under the guise of an environmental organization. GreenWorld claims it strives to 'clean up the world', but actually they kidnap homeless people and mental patients to enslave in a Trancer army. Once again, Hap is under attack, useful to Wardo as the ancestor of future Angel City Council Member Ashe.

Jack is ready to singe some Trancers in the name of the law, but he does not expect his dead wife Alice (Megan Ward) to show up—and neither does Lena. Alice has been saved from death by the City Council and sent back to 1991 to help Jack stop Wardo. The tension mounts as Lena becomes fearful of losing Jack to his future wife, Hap returns to drinking alcohol to deal with the stress, and Jack realizes that when Alice returns to the future, she will die again. Somehow, Jack must find a way to save more than just the future.

== Cast ==
- Tim Thomerson as Jack Deth
- Helen Hunt as Lena Deth
- Megan Ward as Alice Stillwell
- Biff Manard as Hap Ashby
- Martine Beswick as Nurse Trotter
- Jeffrey Combs as Dr. Pyle
- Richard Lynch as Dr. E. D. Wardo
- Alyson Croft as "McNulty"
- Art LaFleur as "Old McNulty" (credited as Art La Fleur)
- Telma Hopkins as Commander Raines
- Barbara Crampton as Sadie Brady
- Sonny Carl Davis as "Rabbit"
- Michael Secora as Ramon
- Willy Parsons as Curly
- Dani Klein as Pearl
- Rhino Michaels as Shovel Man
- Albert Henderson as Wino #3

== Production ==
Following Trancers in 1985, a follow-up short film titled Trancers: City of Lost Angels was filmed in 1987, intended to be part of an anthology project called Pulse Pounders the following year. Pulse Pounders was never released, as its distributor, Empire International Pictures, shut down in 1988 due to debt issues. Aside from City of Lost Angels, screenwriter Danny Bilson claimed that Empire never had any plans for a full sequel, stating

"I don't recall discussing a Trancers sequel other than the Pulse Pounders episode during my time at Empire."

After Empire's shutdown, Charles Band formed a successor called Full Moon Productions a few months later. Band had personally negotiated to retain the rights to Trancers, with a sequel becoming one of the first projects greenlit at Full Moon. Screenwriting duo Danny Bilson and Paul De Meo were initially set to write the film, with Bilson as director; however, they dropped out due to other obligations and Charles Band returned to direct, like he had with the original film.

The film was shot in Los Angeles over the course of three weeks.

== Release ==
Trancers II was first released on VHS and LaserDisc in 1991 and has since then been released on DVD through the Trancers box-set or as a single DVD in Europe. The film was released on Blu-ray on May 19, 2015.

== Reception ==
Entertainment Weekly strongly preferred the first movie, giving the sequel a "D". TV Guide found the performance of Thomerson a plus, but found the rest of the movie goes off the rails. Moira gave the movie 2.5 stars, stating that while it wasn't as good as the first one, it was competent and better than the sequels that follow. Reuniting Deth with his dead wife via time travel was seen as intriguing.

Likewise, The Encyclopedia of Science Fiction found the subplot of Deth having with his current wife and (from his perspective) dead wife together in Deth's past interesting. Creature Feature gave the movie two stars, finding it unnecessarily convoluted.
