= The Evil Clergyman =

1933 story by H. P. Lovecraft

- Short story by H. P. Lovecraft
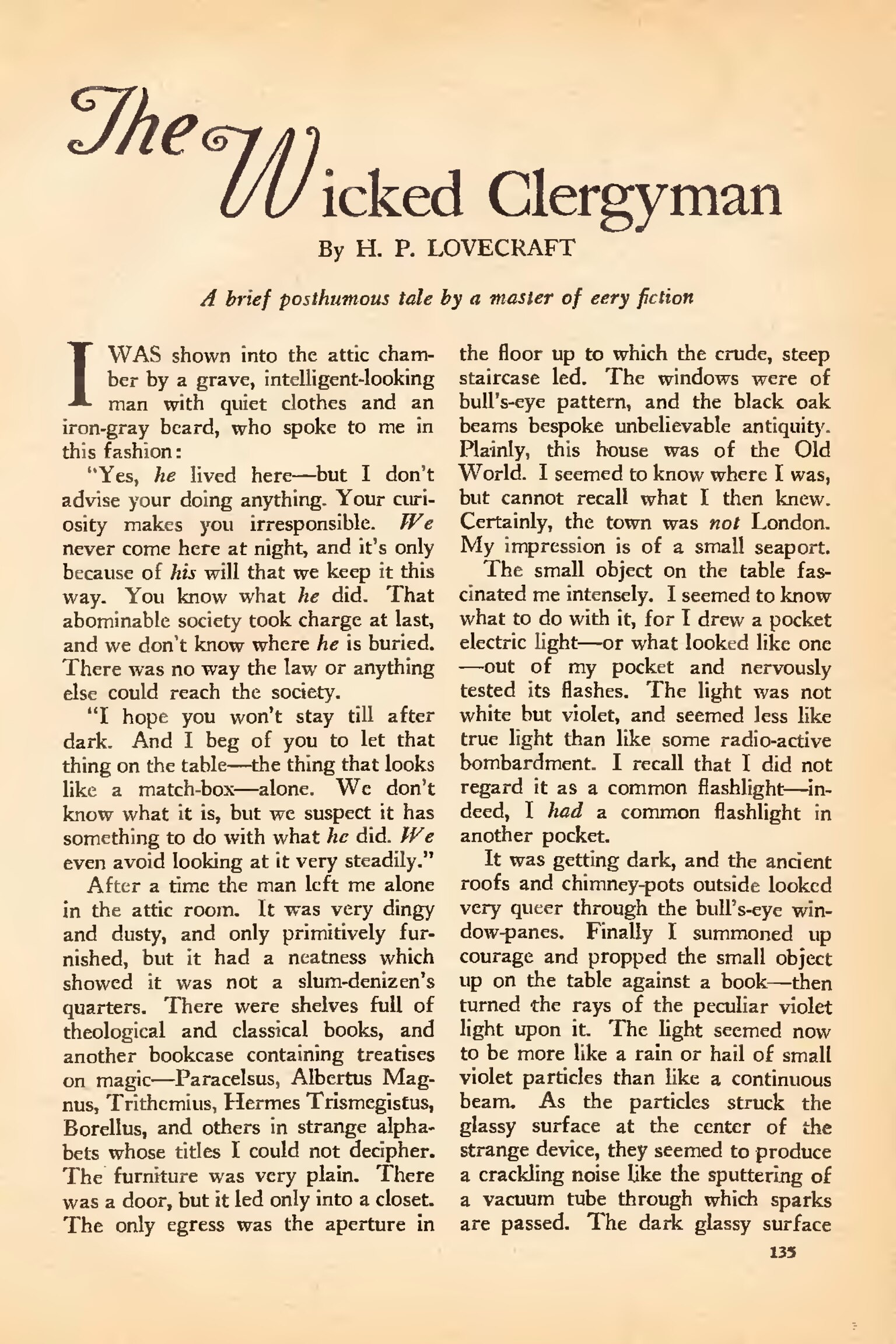

Text available at Wikisource
- Country: United States
- Language: English
- Genre: Horror

Publication
- Published in: Weird Tales
- Publication type: Periodical
- Media type: Print (magazine)
- Publication date: April 1939

"The Evil Clergyman" is an excerpt from a letter written by American horror fiction writer H. P. Lovecraft in 1933. After his death, it was published in the April 1939 issue of Weird Tales as a short story under the title "The Wicked Clergyman". The story was later adapted into the unreleased 1988 anthology film Pulse Pounders.

The letter, to his friend Bernard Austin Dwyer, recounted a dream that Lovecraft had had. Although Lovecraft frequently based stories on his dreams, An H. P. Lovecraft Encyclopedia notes that "[i]t is difficult to say how HPL would have developed this conventional supernatural scenario."

== Plot ==
The story begins in the attic of an ancient house. The narrator's companion refers to the former owner of the house and the presumably violent end that befell him. He advises the narrator not to stay after dark or touch anything, especially the small object on a table, which the companion seems to fear considerably.

The narrator is then left alone in the attic; he notes the many theological and classical books, and one bookshelf in particular containing books on magic. He feels a considerable curiosity for the forbidden object on the table. The narrator finds a strange flashlight-like device in his pocket that produces a peculiar violet glow. He attempts to illuminate the object on the table with this strange light, which he describes as being composed of particles. The object makes a crackling sound like a sparking vacuum tube, and takes on a pinkish glow with a vague white shape taking form from its center. The narrator, feeling that his surroundings are taking on strange new properties, realizes that he is not alone; the sinister newcomer is described as wearing clerical garb typical of the Anglican Church. The newcomer begins throwing magical books into a fireplace.

The narrator notices other men within the room, all dressed in clerical attire, including a bishop; they confront the first man, who reaches for the object on the table with a wry smile. The other men, looking terrified, make a quick retreat. The man then proceeds to retrieve a coil of rope from a cupboard and ties it into a noose as if to hang himself. When the narrator attempts to intervene, the man notices him and approaches threateningly. The narrator shines the strange light on the man as if it were a weapon, causing him to fall backwards down an open stairwell.

When the narrator proceeds towards the stairwell, he finds no body below, but rather three people approaching with lanterns. Two of them see the narrator and flee shrieking, leaving only the companion who had accompanied the narrator to the attic. The companion says that the narrator should have left the object alone, that interfering with it had altered him. The man then leads the narrator to a mirror, where he is presented not with his own reflection, but that of the evil clergyman.

This story is alluded to in Ramsey Campbell's "The Return of the Witch" from The Inhabitant of the Lake where the spirit of Gladys Shorrock tries to take over the body of her home's current inhabitant, using the Evil Clergyman's secrets to do so. The story also gives the location of Lovecraft's story as Severnford, one of Campbell's towns.

== Adaptation ==
In 1987 director Charles Band began filming a short movie adaptation of The Evil Clergyman as part of an anthology film entitled Pulse Pounders. The film was intended to release the next year but was shelved after the closing of Empire International Pictures. The entire movie was deemed to have been lost until 2011, when a workprint of The Evil Clergyman was found and restored. The short was shown at the Chicago Flashback Weekend and released onto DVD in 2012, receiving positive reviews.
