= The Dungeonmaster =

1984 film by Charles Band and Ted Nicolaou

- Theatrical release poster
- Directed by: Dave Allen; Charles Band; John Carl Buechler; Steve Stafford (Note: Brother of star Jeffrey Byron. Credited as Steve Ford in tribute to their godfather John Ford.); Peter Manoogian; Ted Nicolaou; Rosemarie Turko
- Written by: Allen Actor; Dave Allen; Charles Band; John Carl Buechler; Jeffrey Byron; Peter Manoogian; Ted Nicolaou; Rosemarie Turko
- Produced by: Charles Band
- Starring: Jeffrey Byron; Richard Moll; Leslie Wing; Phil Fondacaro; Anthony T. Genova III; Lonnie Hashimoto; Chris Holmes; Michael Steve Jones; Peter Kent; Blackie Lawless; Paul Pape; Randy Piper; Randy Popplewell; Tony Richards; Felix Silla
- Cinematography: Mac Ahlberg
- Music by: Richard Band; Shirley Walker
- Production company: Charles Band production
- Distributed by: Empire Pictures
- Release date: August 24, 1984 (U.S.)
- Running time: 78 minutes
- Country: United States
- Language: English

The Dungeonmaster (originally Ragewar: The Challenges of Excalibrate and Digital Knights) is a 1984 American anthology science fantasy horror film produced by Charles Band, and is split up into seven distinct story segments, each written and directed by a different person: Dave Allen, Band, John Carl Buechler, Steve Ford, Peter Manoogian, Ted Nicolaou and Rosemarie Turko. The film's theme was influenced by the popularity of Disney's 1982 film Tron and the roleplaying game Dungeons & Dragons.

Principal photography began in 1983 but the film was not completed until 1984. The film features an appearance by the heavy metal band W.A.S.P. The film is known for the line of dialogue "I reject your reality and I substitute my own". A sequel to the movie was shot and edited in 1988, which was going to belong to another anthology called Pulse Pounders, but never completed.

== Plot ==
Paul Bradford (Jeffrey Byron) is a skilled computer programmer who lives with his girlfriend, Gwen (Leslie Wing), and "X-CaliBR8", a quasi-sentient personal computer that Paul programmed and which he interacts with via a neural interface. Gwen is jealous of Paul's unusually close relationship with X-CaliBR8, to whom Paul has given a female voice, and fears that their relationship will be destroyed by Paul's reliance on X-CaliBR8 for his various day-to-day activities.

One night, Paul and Gwen are both transported to a Hellish realm presided over by Mestema (Richard Moll), an ancient, demonic sorcerer who has spent millennia seeking a worthy opponent with whom to do battle. Having long defeated his enemies with magic, Mestema has become intrigued with technology, and wishes to pit his skills against Paul's, with the winner claiming Gwen. Arming Paul with a portable version of X-CaliBR8 (which takes the form of a computerized wrist band), Mestema begins transporting Paul into a variety of scenarios in which he must defeat various opponents. Most of the challenges involve Paul using his X-CaliBR8 wristband to shoot people, monsters and objects with laser beams.

After Paul completes Mestema's various challenges, the two engage in a final battle, which takes the form of a fist fight in which Paul kills Mestema by throwing him into a pit of lava. After Mestema dies, Paul and Gwen are transported back to their house, where Gwen expresses her acceptance of X-CaliBR8 and suggests that she and Paul marry.

== Cast ==
- Jeffrey Byron as Paul Bradford, a skilled computer programmer who invented X-Cal-BR8.
- Richard Moll as Mestema
- Leslie Wing as Gwen Rogers, Paul's Girlfriend
- Gina Calabrese as Girl In Dream
- Danial Dion as Monster In Dream
- Bill Bestolarides as Monster In Dream
- Scott Campbell as Monster In Dream
- Ed Dorini as Monster In Dream
- R. J. Miller as Mr. Cahane
- Don Moss as Don
- Alanna Roth as Flower Girl
- Kim Connell as Dancer
- Janet Welsh as Dancer
- Carol Solomon as Dancer
- Jackie Gross as Dancer
- Barbara Mueller as Dancer
- Nina Baker as Dancer
- Paul Pape as Police Officer (uncredited)

=== Ice Gallery ===
- Cleve Hall as Jack The Ripper
- Kenneth J. Hall as Wolfman
- Jack Reed as Mummy
- Guy Simmons as African
- Jeff Rayburn as Handman
- Lonnie Hashimoto as Samurai
- Knowen as Einstein

=== Demons of the Dead ===
- David Karp as Paul Branford's Corpse
- E. Lee Nation as Zombie
- Beverly Miko as Zombie
- James Di Mino as Zombie
- Curtis Lee Garrick as Zombie
- James Chestnut as Zombie
- Peter Kent as Zombie
- John Carl Buechler as Ratspit (credited as Ratspit)

=== Heavy Metal ===
- Blackie Lawless as W.A.S.P. Singer
- Chris Holmes as W.A.S.P. Guitarist
- Randy Piper as W.A.S.P. Guitarist
- Tony Richards as W.A.S.P. Drummer

=== Stone Canyon Giant ===
- Sal Fondacaro as Stone Canyon Person
- Phil Fondacaro as Stone Canyon Person

=== Slasher ===
- Eddie Zammit as Policeman #1
- Mack Ademia as Policeman #2
- Danny Dick as Slasher
- Kurt Braun as Audition Dancer
- Suzanne Lelong as Audition Dancer
- Marika Zoll as Audition Dancer
- Brian R. Carson as Paul Branford's Double

=== Cave Beast ===
- Jerri Pinthus as Cave Beast
- Diane Carter as Angel

=== Desert Pursuit ===
- Michael Steve Jones as Desert Soldier
- Randy Popplewell as Desert Soldier
- Anthony T. Genova III as Desert Soldier
- De Ette Adams as Gwen's Double
- Felix Silla as Desert Bandit (credited as Felix Cilla)

== Segments ==
- "Ice Gallery"
  - Written and directed by Rosemarie Turko
- "Demons of the Dead"
  - Written and directed by John Carl Buechler (credited as John Buechler)
- "Heavy Metal"
  - Written and directed by Charles Band
- "Stone Canyon Giant"
  - Written and directed by David W. Allen (credited as David Allen)
- "Slasher"
  - Written by Jeffrey Byron
  - Directed by Steve Ford
- "Cave Beast"
  - Written and directed by Peter Manoogian
- "Desert Pursuit"
  - Written and directed by Ted Nicolaou

== Release ==
Scream Factory released the film on DVD for the first time in October 2013, along with Contamination 7, Catacombs and Cellar Dweller as part of the second volume of their Scream Factory All-Night Horror Marathon series.

Shout! Factory released The Dungeonmaster on a double feature Blu-ray along with Eliminators in December 2015.

== In pop culture ==
In MythBusters, Adam Savage uses Paul's "I reject your reality and I substitute my own" line as a catchphrase .
