= Handman =

Handman is a surname. Notable people with the surname include:

- Barbara Handman (1928–2013), American political consultant and arts activist
- Lou Handman (1894–1956), American composer
- Wynn Handman (1922–2020), American theatre director

== See also ==
- Handmann
- Alan Hantman (born 1942), American architect
