= The Lurking Fear =

1922 short story by H. P. Lovecraft

- Short story by H. P. Lovecraft
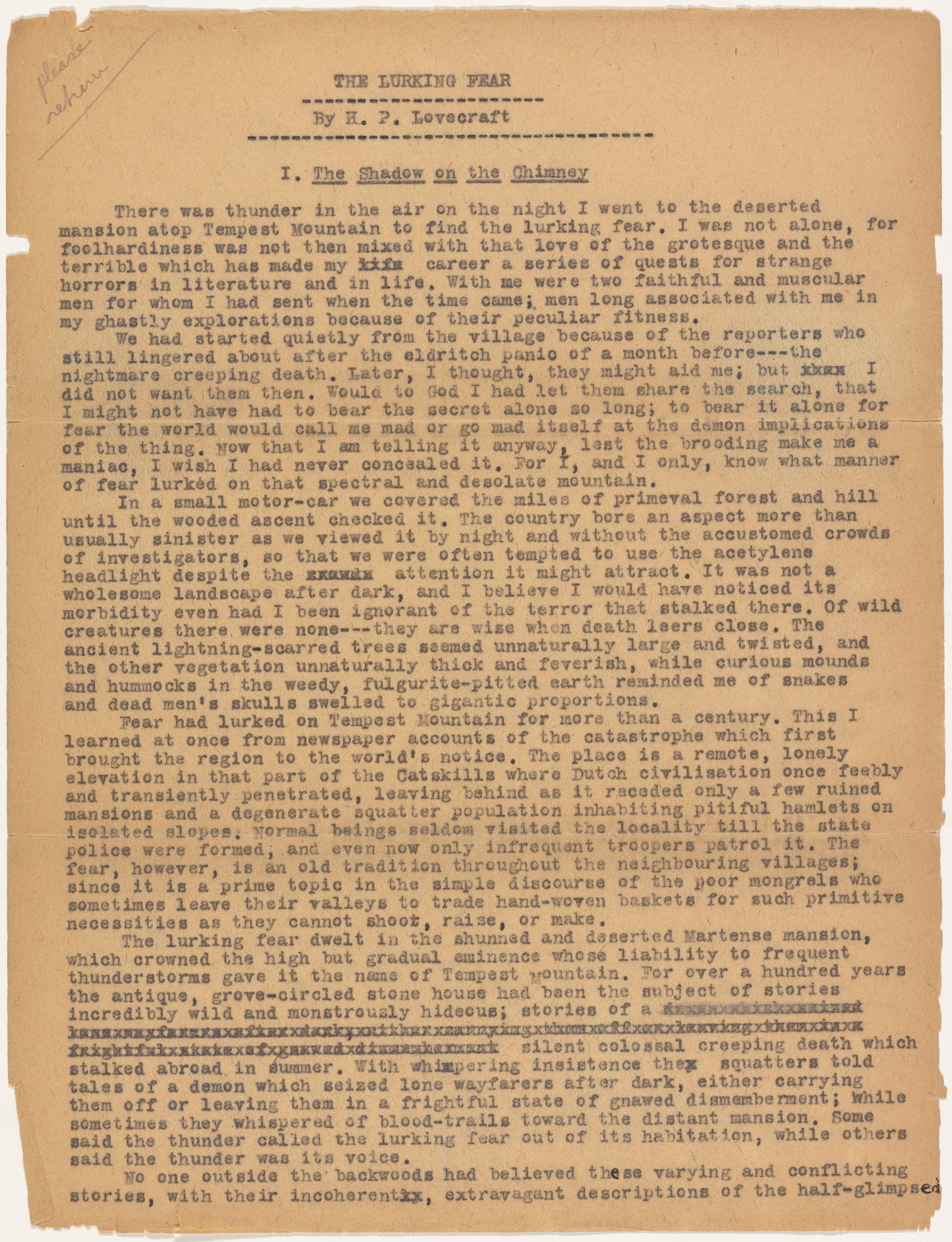
- The Lurking Fear

Text available at Wikisource
- Country: United States
- Language: English
- Genre: Horror

Publication
- Published in: Home Brew
- Publication type: Periodical
- Media type: Print (magazine)
- Publication date: January–April 1923

"The Lurking Fear" is a horror short story by American writer H. P. Lovecraft. Written in November 1922, it was first published in the January through April 1923 issues of Home Brew.

== Plot ==
=== I. The Shadow on the Chimney ===
In 1921, an unnamed monster-hunter travels to Tempest Mountain, in the Catskills range, after reports of various attacks by a group of unidentified creatures against the local inhabitants reaches the media. A month before, an unusually large, destructive thunderstorm had drifted over the region. Many homes were destroyed, seemingly by the storm, but upon closer inspection, the destruction seemed to be left by an enraged beast. The affected area, originally home to only 75 citizens, was completely destroyed, leaving no survivors.

Gathering what information he can from the locals, the hunter finds out that most of the legends surround the foreboding Martense mansion, a century-old Dutch homestead, which has been disregarded by the police as it is apparently abandoned. The hunter, bringing with him two companions as his bodyguards, enters the mansion at night, just when another thunderstorm approaches. He takes up residence in the room of Jan Martense, a member of the family believed to have been murdered. Despite their careful preparation, keeping watch in shifts and sleeping armed, the group eventually drift off to sleep. The hunter wakes up to discover both his companions missing and, in a flash of lightning, witnesses a demonic shadow briefly cast upon the mansion's chimney by a grotesque monster. Neither of his companions are ever seen again.

=== II. A Passer in the Storm ===
Though traumatized by his experience in the mansion, the hunter continues his investigation. He confides in a journalist named Arthur Munroe, telling him of the things he has experienced so far. Munroe agrees to help him, and the two scour the countryside for any clues to the murderous creature or possible remains of the Martenses. There is no trace of the family, but they manage to uncover an ancestral diary which once belonged to them. All the while, the hunter has the constant feeling of being watched. He and Munroe are trapped by yet another thunderstorm and seek shelter in an abandoned cabin, where the hunter thinks back to the horrible events in the mansion. As an unusually large thunderbolt crashes across the sky, Munroe walks over to the window to survey the damage. The storm soon clears up but Munroe doesn't move from the window, and when the hunter tries to rouse him, he finds his face has been hideously gnawed away by some unseen horror outside.

=== III. What the Red Glare Meant ===
Having spent several weeks delving into the Martense family history, the hunter returns to Tempest Mountain, determined to solve the mystery once and for all. Now convinced that the horror plaguing the mountain is connected to the Martense family, he believes the entity to be the ghost of Jan Martense. He has learned that the mansion was built by Gerrit Martense, a Dutch merchant from New Amsterdam who disliked the British conquest of the North American colonies and constructed the remote mansion to take advantage of its solitude.

There, Martense's family grew increasingly isolated from the outside world. They soon grew to intermarrying with the various squatters and servants living around the estate. The resulting offspring spread out across the valley and eventually became the current population of mountain men, but the core family stuck to their mansion, becoming ever more insular. Jan Martense, struck by an unusual restlessness, had joined the colonial army, and he was the only source of information on the rest of the family that had ever reached the outside world. However, upon returning home six years later, he found himself treated as an outsider and made plans to leave, which he told a friend about in letters.

This correspondence soon stopped however, and when his friend visited the mansion in 1763, he was told that Jan Martense had been fatally struck by lightning during a thunderstorm. Jan's friend did not believe this, especially due to the Martenses' disturbing behavior, and upon discovering the grave realized that Jan Martense had been murdered. Though the family were not convicted due to lack of evidence, they were completely shunned by their neighbours. The Martenses soon disappeared entirely, the only signs of continued existence being an occasional light seen in the windows of the mansion, last witnessed in 1810. In 1816, a posse searched the mansion, discovering that the Martenses had seemingly disappeared. The mansion itself was in complete disarray, and had several improvised additions, as it seemed like the family had kept expanding, presumably through inbreeding.

The hunter finds his way to the mansion and digs up Jan Martense's grave, hoping to find some way of setting his spirit to rest. Instead, he falls through the ground into a mysterious burrow. There, he briefly encounters a goblin-like creature lurking in the shadows, which he views through the light of his pocket torch. A sudden lightning-strike hits the tunnel, allowing the hunter to quickly escape, where he sees a distant red glare. Only days later does he find out what the glare is – a burning cabin with one of the creatures inside.

=== IV. The Horror in the Eyes ===
Returning to Martense's grave, the hunter finds that the burrow he previously fell into has completely caved in. He decides to investigate the strange mounds which surround the mansion. While observing from afar, he realizes that the mounds are in fact tunnels made by the creatures. Struck by mania, he digs his way into one of the tunnels through the mansion's cellar and finds a catacomb-like system of passages. As another thunderstorm approaches, he sees countless creatures emerge from the ground; one of the weaker members of the grotesque mob is attacked and eaten by one of its compatriots. The hunter shoots one of the creatures as it straggles behind the rest of the pack, using a clap of thunder to disguise the pistol's noise. Upon closer inspection, he notices the creature's heterochromia and realizes that the deformed, hair-covered creature is in fact a member of the Martense family, who have devolved into hideous ape-like beasts thanks to centuries of isolation and inbreeding. The hunter remembers nothing more until waking some time later in a nearby village. Thoroughly traumatized by his experiences, he has the mansion, surrounding woods, and hillside completely destroyed with explosives, but is unable to heal his mind from the horrors that he experienced, always fearing that creatures like the Martenses could be anywhere.

== Characters ==
- The narrator: The unnamed narrator describes himself as "a connoisseur in horrors", one whose "love of the grotesque and the terrible... has made my career a series of quests for strange horrors in literature and in life." He reports that following his encounter with the Martense creatures, "I cannot see a well or a subway entrance without shuddering"—an example of the phobias that often afflict Lovecraft's protagonists as a result of their experiences.
- George Bennett and William Tobey: Described by the narrator as "two faithful and muscular men...long associated with me in my ghastly explorations because of their peculiar fitness."
- Arthur Munroe: A reporter who comes to the village of Lefferts Corners to cover the lurking fear, he is described as "a dark, lean man of about thirty-five, whose education, taste, intelligence, and temperament all seemed to mark him as one not bound to conventional ideas and experiences."

The name Munroe may derive from Lovecraft's childhood friends, the brothers Chester and Harold Munroe. Harold had gotten back in touch with Lovecraft a little more than a year before "The Lurking Fear" was written, and they had revisited a clubhouse they had constructed together as boys. Sonia Greene's apartment was located in an area of Brooklyn known as Prospect Lefferts Gardens, as well as the Lefferts Historic House located in Prospect Park and in walking distance of Sonia Greene's apartment.

- Gerrit Martense: Gerrit Martense is "a wealthy New-Amsterdam merchant who disliked the changing order under British rule". He built the Martense mansion in 1670 "on a remote woodland summit whose untrodden solitude and unusual scenery pleased him." His descendants, who are "reared in hatred of the English civilization, and trained to shun such of the colonists as accepted it," are distinguished by having one brown and one blue eye.

Martense is an old New Amsterdam name; there is a Martense Street in Flatbush, Brooklyn, near Sonia Greene's apartment where Lovecraft stayed in April 1922.

- Jan Martense: Jan Martense is "the first of Gerrit's descendants to see much of the world"; he joins the colonial army in 1754, after hearing of the Albany Congress, a meeting that attempted to unite the North American colonies. When he returns to the Martense mansion in 1760, he is treated as an outsider by his family; he finds he can no longer "share the peculiarities and prejudices of the Martenses, while the very mountain thunderstorms failed to intoxicate him as they had before." When a friend looks for him in 1763, his relatives say that he had been struck by lightning and killed the previous autumn; when the friend, suspicious, digs up Jan's unmarked grave, he discovers "a skull crushed cruelly as if by savage blows." Though acquitted of his murder, the Martenses are ostracized and the mansion appears to have been abandoned by 1810. Investigators in 1816 found the place more like an animal's den than a stately manor.

The Jans Martense Schenck house originally built in Mill Basin, built 1656, is believed to be the oldest surviving house in New York City. Robert Suydam in "The Horror at Red Hook" lives in a "lonely house, set back from Martense Street."

== Origin ==
Like "Herbert West–Reanimator", earlier published in Home Brew, "The Lurking Fear" was solicited by editor George Julian Houtain expressly to be published as a serial. Unlike with "Herbert West", however, Houtain ran recaps of the story so far with each installment after the first, relieving Lovecraft of the need for objectionable repetition.

== Reception ==
Comparing it to Lovecraft's earlier story in Home Brew, Lin Carter wrote that while "The Lurking Fear" is "a more serious study in traditional horror, it lacks the light, almost joyous touch of 'Herbert West.'" E. F. Bleiler's and Richard Bleiler's book Science-Fiction: The Early Years describes the story as "digressive and clumsily written, perhaps because it was written for serial publication".

== Adaptations ==
- A graphic novel adaptation written by Steven Philip Jones and drawn by Octavio Cariello was originally published in 1991 by Malibu Graphics. It was reprinted in an individual graphic novel in 2016 by Caliber Comics and is part of Caliber's H. P. Lovecraft Worlds anthology series.
- Dark Heritage, a 1989 film adaptation.
- Lurking Fear, a 1994 film adaptation.
- Bleeders, a 1997 film adaptation.
- The Lurking Fear, a 2019 radio drama adaptation by the HP Lovecraft Historical Society
- The Dungeons & Dragons monsters called Gibberlings are based on the creatures from the story.
- The Lurking Fear, a 2023 Tubi Original film adaptation.

== Appearances in other media ==
The story is referenced in the film Marauders

== See also ==
- "The Beast in the Cave"

== Sources ==
- Lin Carter, Lovecraft: A Look Behind the Cthulhu Mythos.
- S. T. Joshi and David E. Schultz, An H. P. Lovecraft Encyclopedia.
- H. P. Lovecraft, "The Lurking Fear", Dagon and Other Macabre Tales.
