= Live Evil (film) =

- Theatrical poster
- Directed by: Jay Woelfel
- Written by: Jay Woelfel
- Based on: a story by Lance Polland; Lenny Lenox and Vito Trabucco
- Produced by: Mark Terry; Elisabeth Busch; Beau Unger
- Starring: Tim Thomerson; Ken Foree; Gregory Lee Kenyon; Tiffany Shepis; Chuck Williams; Jeff Burr
- Cinematography: Kelly Richard; Scott Spears
- Edited by: Jonathan Ammon
- Music by: Austin Wintory
- Production company: Live Evil The Movie Enterprises
- Distributed by: Warner Brothers (United States VOD) 2009; Rivercoast Films (USA DVD 2010)
- Release date: November 1, 2009 (Video on Demand)
- Running time: 97 minutes
- Country: United States
- Language: English
- Budget: $400,000

Live Evil, also recut and re-released as Samurai Priest Vampire Hunter, is a 2009 independent action horror film directed by Jay Woelfel, produced by Mark Terry and starring Tim Thomerson, Ken Foree, Mark Hengst and Tiffany Shepis.

== Plot ==
Vampires are finding their own undead bodies being mutated by the pollution of the host's blood, tainted with hard drugs and sexually transmitted diseases, alcohol, diabetes, anti-depressants, and cigarettes: substances that change the blood and makes it undrinkable for vampires. The scarcity of good blood has incited an underground civil war between various groups of vampires. A clique of 4 vampires, led by Benedict (Mark Hengst), struggle to find sustenance by seeking victims with untainted blood. The group is being stalked by a samurai sword-wielding vampire-killing Priest (Tim Thomerson), who leaves a note on the bodies of slain vampires in the form of a playing card inscribed with the words "Live Evil". In order to survive both their race's own fierce infighting and the biological pollution found in human blood, the group desperately seeks out Max (Ken Foree), a "blood pusher" who steals from hospital blood banks to offer the freshest and purest blood around. But they may not have time to enjoy it, because the vengeful Priest is hot on their trail.

== Cast ==
- Tim Thomerson as Priest
- Ken Foree as Max
- Gregory Lee Kenyon as Baxter, The Vampire
- Tiffany Shepis as "Spider"
- Mark Hengst as Benedict, The Vampire Leader
- Chuck Williams as Desert Bartender
- Osa Wallander as Sydney, The Vampire
- Jeff Burr as The Bathroom Trucker
- Mark Terry as David
- Lee Perkins as Officer Hicks
- Sean Cain as Severin
- Eva Derrek as Yael, The Vampire
- Elissa Dowling as Jerry
- Dan Glenn as Chad
- Mike Meadows as Mac
- Sebastian Saraceno as Clyde
- Cherrae L. Stuart as Cee
- Hawk Younkins as Officer Fowler
- Jenny Hendrix as Naked Party Girl #1
- Ann Marie Rios as Naked Party Girl #2

== Production ==
When producer Mark Terry moved with friends to Los Angeles from Florida, he was contacted by an alleged investor wishing a film to be made and whose caveat was that the film had to be a vampire film. Terry and his friends wrote the first draft of the film and the original investor pulled out. After shooting the film's opening scenes in March 2006, and feeling the production would never be completed, the friends lost interest. When told by them that they wished to quit the production, Terry and another producer signed a script option for the screenplay and opening scene, found a new investor, had a script rewrite done by Jay Woelfel specifically with Tim Thomerson in mind. Principle filming on the feature began in November 2006, six months after the first scene was shot. Filming took place on weekends and lasted several months. The film was screened at various film festivals in order to attract the attention of potential distributors.

On July 23, 2019 it was announced via in a Filmmaker Magazine article about motion picture film scanning that Live Evil was being restored and rebranded as Samurai Priest Vampire Hunter.

== Critical reception ==
The Tampa Tribune wrote that the film "is a throwback to the gory, tongue-in-cheek monster movies that dominated video rental shelves in the 1980s and early 1990s and were produced by Charles Band’s Full Moon Pictures or Lloyd Kaufman’s Troma Studios." They noted that the film was what one might expect as a first effort, and that it contained structural issues caused by the film's erratic production schedule, but wrote that considering its limited budget, "The script shows flashes of promise, and the special effects are impressive", and that as an action/horror film, "it more than meets the criteria required by fans of low-budget, Grindhouse-style frightfests".

DVD Talk, while praising actor Tim Thomerson's work in the film, noted a few problems with the production itself, writing the film "would have been more consistently successful had some further editing been done. A vampire party at a blood dealer's home (the dealer is played by character actor Ken Foree, who also executive produced) was a clever idea but runs on far too long." They made note of the film's inclusion of public domain footage from the silent horror film classic Nosferatu, but expanded that simply because such footage is available "doesn't mean that every other low budget vampire movie needs to find a way of jamming footage from that film into their narrative." They also noted that the film's "climactic battle between the Priest and the vampires also feels too-long, and a surprise 'twist' at the end isn't all that surprising." In noting the film's perceived flaws, they concluded that the film "has more creativity and a sense of schlocky fun than the majority of its low-budget ilk. And it's good to see Tim Thomerson up to his old tough guy routine. Given its generous extras (more on these in a bit), I'd give this release a mild recommendation for horror and cult film fans." Of the film's video, the felt that the film's use non-anamorphic widescreen format revealed "artifacts, aliasing, and a general lack of clarity." Of the film's sound, the wrote that opposite of the visual quality, "the sound comes across strongly," in that its dialogue "was always clear, and sound effects well-represented."

Bloody Disgusting made note of the film's "Clearly taking advantage of America’s approval of vampire worship as the new national religion," and that with a plot of vampires finding good human blood more and more difficult to find resulting in infighting among the survivors, the film felt related to the Blade film franchise. They also felt that although the film was "Slightly reminiscent of Near Dark, it brought "enough blood and boobs to the table to entertain even the most jaded horror fan." They praised the productions special effects team for pulling "out all the stops when it comes to bringing the syrupy wet work." They made note of the film's introduction of vampire babies (“Goddamned vampire babies”, intones Thomerson, “they’re the worst.”)" and praised the writer/director: "[Jay] Woelfel slams down the creative gas pedal and doesn’t let up until the end credits roll." They concluded that for those viewers "willing to ignore sub-par production values, Live Evil pays off in spades."

411Mania.com reported on April 8, 2024 that Samurai Priest Vampire Hunter was currently streaming to rent or buy on Xfinity cable services and giving the film a 10 out of 10 "virtually perfect" rating.

== Release ==
In September 2008, the film had both its festival premiere at the Valley Film Festival in North Hollywood, and it theatrical debut at the Beach Theater in St. Petersburg Beach, and was released to Video on Demand by Warner Brothers in 2009, followed by a DVD release in 2010 by Rivercoast Films. The DVD contains a widescreen transfer with 5.1 Surround Sound, and extras include an audio commentary by writer/director Jay Woelfel, producer Mark Terry, and acor MarkHengst, Deleted scenes with commentary by Woelfel, a video clip of the Fangoria's Weekend of Horrors's Q&A with Thomerson and Woelfel, a promo video clip of the film's debut at "Weekend of Horrors", Thomerson introducing the film at "Flashback Weekend", the featurette Stunts: Behind the Scenes”, the original theatrical trailer, and a bonus short film Night Demons with an introduction by Mark Terry. BSX Records released composer Austin Wintory's motion picture soundtrack to "Live Evil" in July 2010.

Recut and rebranded as Samurai Priest Vampire Hunter and directed, written and produced by Mark Terry, it premiered August 4, 2023 at the Laemmle NoHo7 in North Hollywood, CA as part of the Valley Film Festival. The Valley Film Festival is the same festival Live Evil premiered in September 2008.

The Hollywood Reporter interviewed Mark Terry in an article that was released October 31, 2023 during the American Film Market stating that Samurai Priest Vampire Hunter is being distributed by Synkronized Distribution.

The article also stated that Terry went back and shot another 20 days’ worth of footage, some using the original actors and some using doubles, redoing some scenes (including one with baby vampires, this time using six animatronic dolls) and filming several new scenes that weren’t in the original. The biggest change came with the use of animation, Terry choosing to frame Samurai Priest as if it was all coming from a comic book. More than 100 animated comic book panels were drawn, many used to replace the original — perhaps defective — footage from the existing fim negative.

TubiTV released the film free via its advertising platform on March 31, 2024.

Samurai Priest Vampire Hunter was released on Blu-Ray on June 1, 2025 through Vinegar Syndrome's partner label ETR Media.
