= Pulse Pounders =

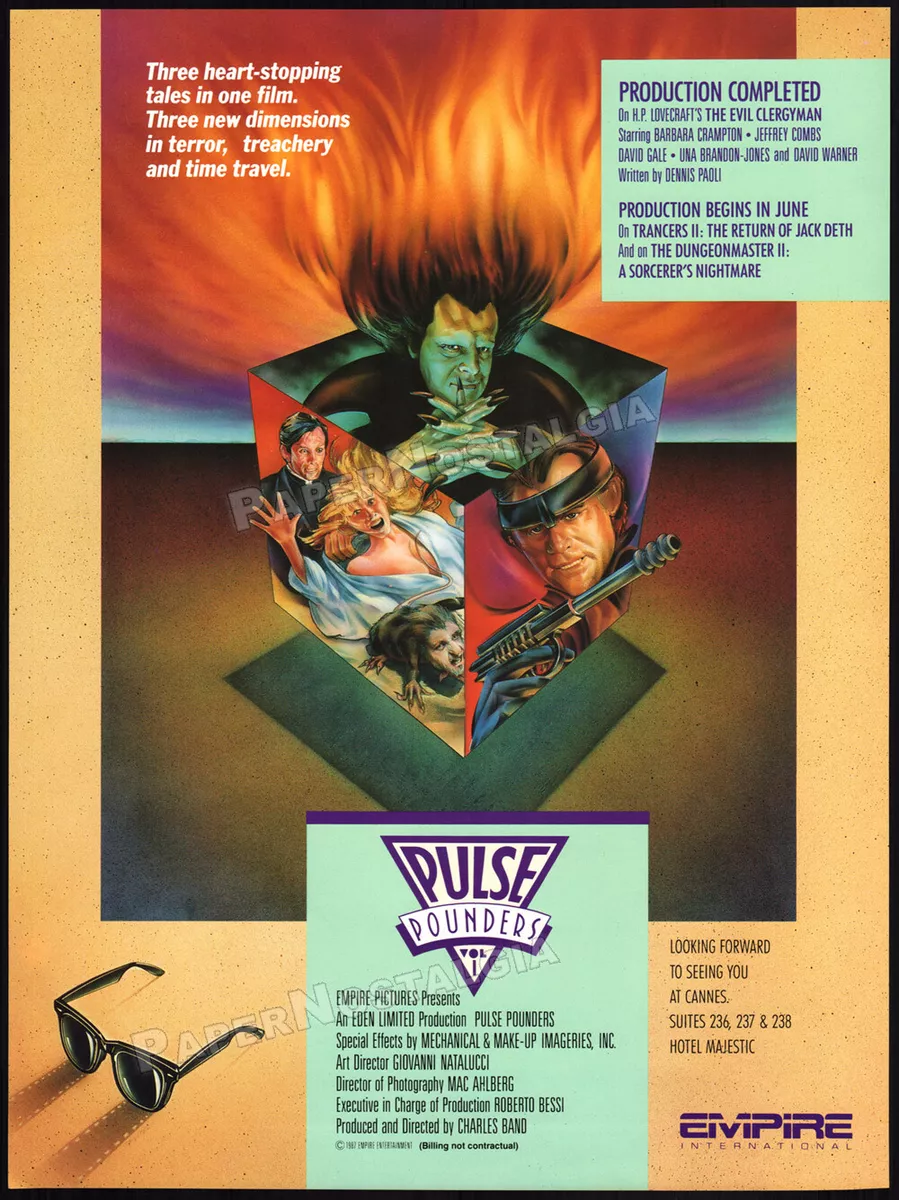
- poster promoting the film before its canceled release
- Directed by: Charles Band
- Written by: Danny Bilson; Paul DeMeo; Dennis Paoli; Michael Cassutt
- Starring: Richard Moll; Jeffrey Byron; Tim Thomerson; Helen Hunt; Art LaFleur; Telma Hopkins; Jeffrey Combs; Barbara Crampton; David Gale; David Warner
- Cinematography: Mac Ahlberg
- Distributed by: Empire Pictures
- Release date: 1988
- Running time: 77 minutes
- Country: United States
- Language: English

Pulse Pounders is a 1988 American anthology film directed by Charles Band. The film is composed of three 30-minute films, two of which are sequels to The Dungeonmaster and Trancers. The third is an adaptation of H. P. Lovecraft's "The Evil Clergyman". Pulse Pounders was originally shot during 1987 and 1988 with the intention of being released, but was shelved due to the collapse of Empire Pictures.

A workprint of Pulse Pounders was discovered in 2011 and was digitally restored. The Evil Clergyman segment received its world premiere at a showing at the Chicago Flashback Weekend. The movie received mostly positive reviews. HorrorNews.net stated that the movie was a "must-watch for any Re-Animator fan" but that it "doesn't quite live up to Re-Animator". The Evil Clergyman was later released as a DVD by Full Moon Pictures in October 2012.

The Trancers segment received its world premiere with the launch of Full Moon Streaming with the title Trancers: City of Lost Angels on September 6, 2013. It was later released on DVD in November. The Dungeonmaster segment is the only one that remains virtually lost, with only a few fragments of its trailer remaining, and a fragment that was released from the "Trancers 1.5: City of Lost Angels" DVD.

== Cast ==
THE EVIL CLERGYMAN SEQUENCE:

- Barbara Crampton as Said Brady
- Jeffrey Combs as Jonathan
- David Warner as Evil Clergyman
- David Gale as Rat Creature
- Una Brandon-Jones as Landlady

TRANCERS SEQUENCE:

- Tim Thomerson as Jack Deth
- Helen Hunt as Leena Deth
- Art LaFleur as McNulty
- Grace Zabriskie as The Warden
- Telma Hopkins as Ruthie Raines
- Alyson Croft as Little McNulty
- Velvet Rhodes as Edlin Shock

DUNGEONMASTER 2 SEQUENCE:

- Richard Moll as Mestema
- Jeffrey Byron as Paul Bradford
- Lee Ving as Elliott
- Preston Lockwood as Merlin
