= Megan Ward =

American actress (b. 1969)

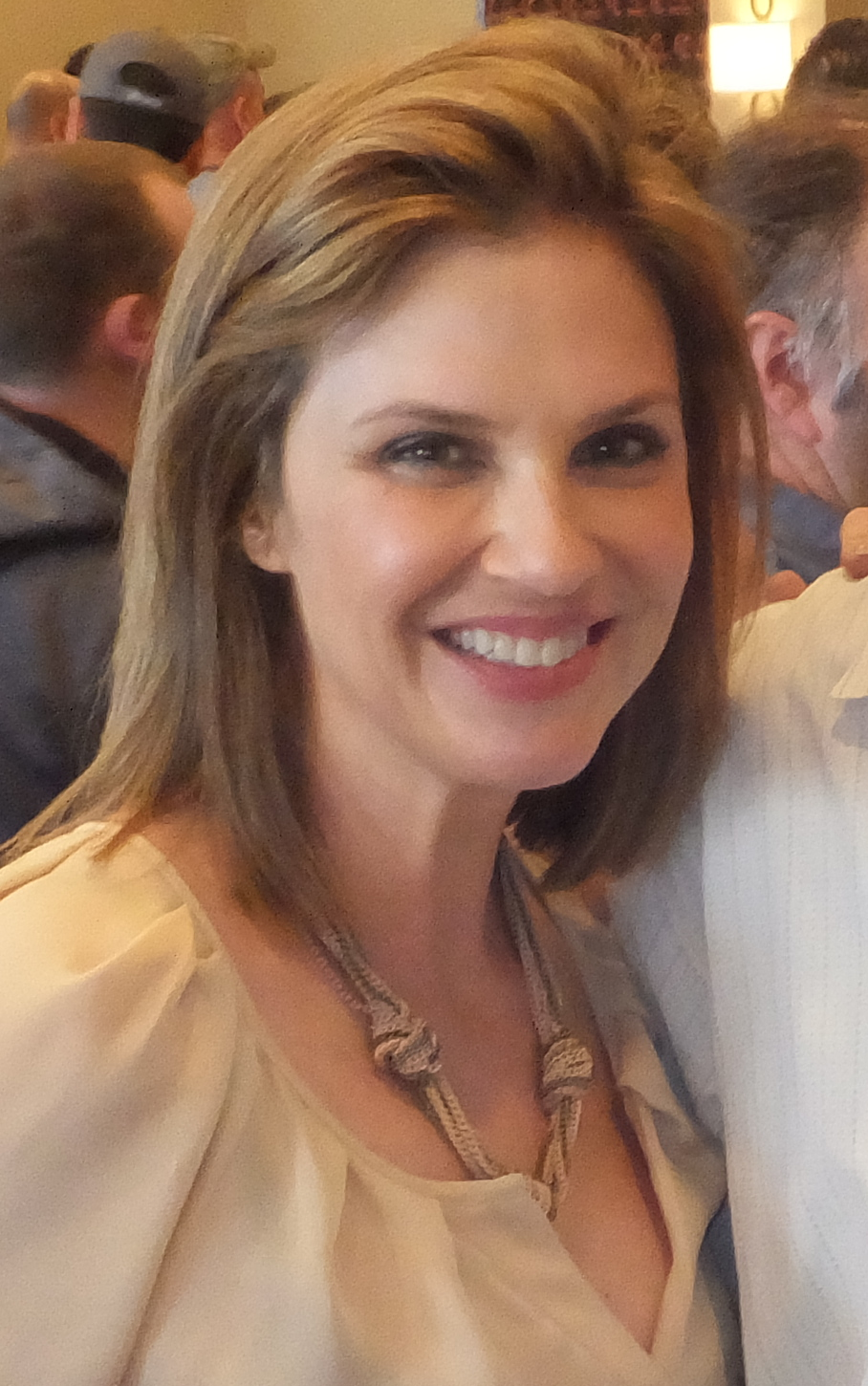
- Ward in 2014
- Born: September 24, 1969 (age 57); Los Angeles, California, U.S.
- Occupation: Actress
- Years active: 1990–present
- Known for: Encino Man; Joe's Apartment; Dark Skies; Class of '96; General Hospital; Freaked
- Spouse: Michael Shore (m. 1995)
- Children: 2

Megan Ward (born September 24, 1969) is an American actress. She is best known for her numerous credits in science fiction and horror movies and television series. In 2007, she joined the cast of the American daytime drama General Hospital as Kate Howard. She also appeared in the 1990s comedies Encino Man, Freaked, PCU, The Brady Bunch Movie, and Joe's Apartment.

== Early life ==
Ward, born on September 24, 1969, in Los Angeles, California, is the youngest of four siblings, and her parents were both professional actors and acting coaches. When Ward was four years old in 1973, her family moved to Honolulu, Hawaii. At the age of nine in 1979, she began doing commercials for local department stores. In her early teens, she went to Japan for modeling jobs and stayed for several years. Having previously learned to speak the language from her schooling in Hawaii, she landed a job hosting a Japanese television show, Science Q, a science TV program broadcast in NHK from 1988 to February 1989.

== Career ==
After graduating from Kaiser High School, Ward moved to Los Angeles to pursue an acting career, and secured roles in science-fiction and comedy movies (including leading roles in Charles Band's classics Crash and Burn, Trancers II and Trancers III (as Jack Deth's future-wife), Arcade, and the 1993 Tom Stern/Alex Winter horror/comedy Freaked). She is also well known for playing Robyn Sweeney, the teen crush of Dave (played by Sean Astin), in the 1992 comedy Encino Man.

In the mid-1990s, Ward had a recurring role on the show Party of Five. Following the exit of her Party of Five character, Ward took the lead role in the Cold War UFO thriller-series Dark Skies. Since the cancellation of Dark Skies, she was appearing in mainly direct-to-video films such as Tick Tock and Mirror Man as well as TV series such as Summerland, Sports Night, Kevin Hill, and Boomtown, in which she had a substantial part.

She later debuted as Kate Howard on General Hospital on May 4, 2007. Ward was taken off contract in March 2009 and remained on the series as a recurring character. In 2010, Ward was dropped completely from the cast of General Hospital. She made a special guest appearance on the show in 2018. Ward has also made a guest appearance on CSI: NY.

Most recently, Ward portrayed Michelle in the horror-thriller film The Invited under the direction of Ryan McKinney.

== Personal life ==
In 1995, Ward married Michael Shore, whom she met in acting class. They have two children, a son named Oliver (born in 2001) and a daughter named Audrey (born in 2006).

== Filmography ==
=== Film ===
Year	Title	Role	Notes
1990	Crash and Burn	Arren	Direct-to-video film
1991	Trancers II	Alice Stillwell	Direct-to-video film
1991	Goodbye Paradise	Little Sharon	
1992	Encino Man	Robyn Sweeney	
1992	Amityville: It's About Time	Lisa Sterling	Direct-to-video film
1992	Trancers III	Alice Stillwell	Direct-to-video film
1993	Arcade	Alex Manning	Direct-to-video film
1993	Freaked	Julie	
1994	PCU	Katy	
1995	The Brady Bunch Movie	Donna Leonard	
1995	Glory Daze	Joanie	
1996	Joe's Apartment	Lily Dougherty	
1999	Say You'll Be Mine	Melanie	
2000	Tick Tock	Rachel Avery	also known as A Friendship to Die For
2003	Mirror Man	Cheryl Parker	Short film
2005	Complete Guide to Guys	Kelly	
2007	Wedding Dreams	Rebecca	
2010	The Invited	Michelle	
TBA	Teller's Camp	Kate Teller	post-production

=== Television ===
Year	Title	Role	Notes
1990	What a Dummy	Tracy	Episode: "The Substitute"
1990	Out of This World	Kimberly	Episode: "Evie's High Anxiety"
1991	Sons and Daughters	DiDi	Episode: "Dating Game"
1993	Class of '96	Patty Horvath	Main role, 17 episodes
1994	Winnetka Road	Nicole Manning	Main role, 6 episodes
1994	Sweet Justice	Dedra	Episode: "One Good Woman"
1994–1995	Party of Five	Jill Holbrook	Recurring role, 9 episodes
1995	Naomi & Wynonna: Love Can Build a Bridge	Ashley Judd	Television film
1995	The Single Guy	Monica	Episode: "Gift"
1996	Voice from the Grave	Renee Perkins	Television film
1996–1997	Dark Skies	Kimberly Sayers	Main role, 18 episodes
1997–1998	Melrose Place	Connie Rexroth	Recurring role, 7 episodes
1998	Four Corners	Kate Wyatt	Main role
1998	Don't Look Down	Carla Engel	Television film
1998	Fantasy Island	Ashley Gable	Episode: "Wishboned"
1999	Jesse	April	Episode: "My Casual Friend's Wedding"
1999	Friends	Nancy	Episode: "The One Where Rachel Smokes"
1999–2000	Sports Night	Pixley Robinson	Episodes: "A Girl Named Pixley", "The Giants Win the Pennant, the Giants Win the Pennant"
2000	Rated X	Meredith	Television film
2001	All Souls	N/A	Episode: Pilot
2002–2003	Boomtown	Kelly Stevens	Recurring role, 8 episodes
2003	Mr. Ambassador	Amy	Television film
2003	The West Wing	Jane	Episode: "Guns Not Butter"
2003	CSI: Crime Scene Investigation	Audrey Hilden	Episode: "A Night at the Movies"
2004	Without a Trace	Hillary Sterling	Episode: "Life Rules"
2004	Summerland	Karen Westerly	Episode: Pilot
2004	Murder Without Conviction	Christine Bennett	Television film
2004	Kevin Hill	Heather Valerio	Episode: "House Arrest"
2004	NCIS	Laura Rowens	Episode: "Forced Entry"
2004	Boston Legal	Susan May	Episode: "Hired Guns"
2005	CSI: Miami	Jennie Hale	Episode: "Vengeance"
2005	ER	Judy Anderson	Episode: "Blame It on the Rain"
2005	7th Heaven	Sally	Episode: "Chicken Noodle Heads"
2005	Sleeper Cell	Angela Fuller	4 episodes
2007–2010, 2018, 2020	General Hospital	Kate Howard	Recurring role, 365 episodes
2010	Ghost Whisperer	Daisy	Episode: "Dead Air"
2010	CSI: Crime Scene Investigation	Lisa Adams	Episode: "Fracked"
2011	CSI: NY	Annie Cartland	Episode: "Vigilante"
2018	Party Mom	Caroline	Television film
