= Leslie Wing =

American actress

- Occupation: Actress
- Years active: 1983–2008

Leslie Wing is an American former actress.

== Career ==
From 2006 to 2008, Wing played the role of Lucille Bolton, mother of Troy Bolton (Zac Efron) in the High School Musical trilogy. She also starred in the 1984 film The Dungeonmaster. Following the release of 2008's High School Musical 3: Senior Year, Wing retired from acting.

She was one of the final three actresses — along with Jennifer Beals (who was selected) and Demi Moore — considered for the lead role of Alex Owens in Flashdance.

== Personal life ==
As of 2015, she lives in Lafayette, Colorado, where she is a small business owner, and owns a popular coffee shop called East Simpson Coffee Company.

== Filmography ==
=== Film ===
| Year | Film | Role | Notes |
|---|---|---|---|
| 1984 | The Lonely Guy | Brenda | |
| 1985 | The Dungeonmaster | Gwen Rogers | |
| 1987 | Retribution | Jennifer Curtis | |
| 1993 | Calendar Girl | Ned's Mother | |
| 1996 | The Frighteners | Mrs Waterhouse | |
| 1998 | Strangeland | Madeline Roth | |
| 2008 | High School Musical 3: Senior Year | Lucille Bolton | |

=== Television ===
| Year | Title | Role | Notes |
|---|---|---|---|
| 1983 | Knight Rider | Layla Charon Callan | Episode: "Ring of Fire" |
| 1983 | Girls of the White Orchid | Lisa | Television film |
| 1984 | The Cowboy and the Ballerina | Natalia | Television film |
| 1984 | Simon & Simon | Ballerina Holly McGinnis | Episode: "Heels and Toes" |
| 1985 | This Is the Life | | 2 episodes |
| 1985 | The Fall Guy | Kate Hillman | Episode: "Tailspin" |
| 1985 | Love, Mary | Jill | Television film |
| 1985 | Moonlighting | Mary Goodman | Episode: "Twas The Episode Before Christmas" |
| 1985 | Shadow Chasers | Amelia | Episode: "The Many Lives of Jonathan" |
| 1986 | Mike Hammer | | Episode: "Deirdre" |
| 1987 | CBS Summer Playhouse | Annie | Episode: "Travelin' Man" |
| 1987 | Perry Mason: The Case of the Lost Love | Woman | Television film |
| 1988 | Magnum, P.I. | Miss Rockwell | Episode: "Unfinished Business" |
| 1992 | The Trials of Rosie O'Neill | | Episode: "Double Bind" |
| 1993 | Melrose Place | Therapist | Episode: "State of Need" |
| 1989, 1993 | Matlock | Hillary Benson / Jane Dryden | 2 episodes |
| 1995 | Babylon 5 | Mother | Episode: "And Now For a Word" |
| 1995 | Xena: Warrior Princess | Queen Karis | 2 episodes |
| 2005 | Everwood | Registration Woman | Episode: "Giving Up the Girl" |
| 2006 | High School Musical | Lucille Bolton | Television film |
| 2006 | Return to Halloweentown | Dr. Goodwyn | Television film |
| 2007 | High School Musical 2 | Lucille Bolton | Television film |
