= Art Deco Detective =

- Directed by: Philippe Mora
- Starring: John Dennis Johnston
- Release date: September 16, 1994
- Running time: 101 mins.
- Country: United States
- Language: English

Art Deco Detective is a 1994 film directed by Philippe Mora. In the film, while investigating the murder of a movie star, a detective finds that he is being set up for the crime. The detective's full name is Arthur Decowitz, but he is known to all as "Art Deco," hence the title.

== Cast ==
- John Dennis Johnston as Detective Arthur Decowitz
- Jonathan Ball as Bip Marceau
- Sonia Nassery Cole as Irina Bordat
- Brion James as Jim Wexler
- Maxine John-James as Lana Torrido
- Stephen McHattie as "Hyena"
- Dina Morrone as Sofia
- Rena Riffel as Julie / Meg Hudson
- Joe Santos as Detective Guy Lean
- Eddi Wilde as Sergei
- Heinrich James as German Terrorist
- Jim Chiros as Masked Terrorist
- Biff Manard as Stocking Terrorist
- Mel Smith as Porno Movie Director
- Brad Wilson as Rout Vikking
