= Joe's Apartment =

- Theatrical release poster
- Directed by: John Payson
- Written by: John Payson
- Based on: Joe's Apartment by John Payson
- Produced by: Diana Phillips; Bonni Lee
- Starring: Jerry O'Connell; Megan Ward
- Cinematography: Peter Deming
- Edited by: Peter Frank
- Music by: Carter Burwell
- Production companies: The Geffen Film Company; MTV Productions
- Distributed by: Warner Bros.
- Release date: July 26, 1996
- Running time: 80 minutes
- Country: United States
- Language: English
- Budget: $13 million
- Box office: $4.6 million

Joe's Apartment is a 1996 American musical black comedy film written and directed by John Payson (in his feature directorial debut), and based on his 1992 short film of the same name. It stars Jerry O'Connell and Megan Ward. The main focus of the story is the fact that, unbeknownst to many humans, cockroaches can talk, but prefer not to, as humans "smush first and ask questions later". They also sing and even have their own public-access television cable TV channel. Actors providing the roaches' voices included Billy West (in his feature film debut), Jim Turner, Rick Aviles (in his final film role), Tim Blake Nelson, BD Wong, and Dave Chappelle.

Joe's Apartment was the first MTV Films production and the first film Blue Sky Studios was involved in. It is also the only MTV Films production made without the involvement of Paramount Pictures. The film was released by Warner Bros. on July 26, 1996 and received generally negative reviews from critics and was a box-office bomb, merely grossing over $4 million against a budget of $13 million.

== Plot ==
Impoverished and straight out of the University of Iowa, Joe F. moves to New York needing an apartment and a job. With the fortuitous death of Mrs. Grotowski, an artist named Walter Shit helps Joe take over the last rent-controlled apartment in a building slated for demolition by convincing everyone that Mrs. Grotowski was Joe's mother. If Senator Dougherty can empty the building, he can make way for the prison he intends to build there, and uses thug Alberto Bianco and his nephews, Vlad and Jesus, to intimidate tenants.

Joe discovers that he has twenty to thirty thousand roommates, all of them talking, singing cockroaches who are grateful that a new roommate has moved in. Led by Ralph, the sentient, tune-savvy insects scare away the thugs in an act of enlightened self-interest that endears them to their human meal ticket. Tired of living on handouts from mom back in Iowa and after a series of dead-end jobs ruined by his well-intentioned six-legged roomies, Joe finds himself the unskilled drummer in Walter Shit's band. Hanging posters for SHIT, he encounters Senator Dougherty's daughter Lily, promoting her own project, a community garden to occupy the vacant site surrounding Joe's building.

A gift to Lily while working on her garden is enough to woo her back to Joe's apartment. However, the cockroaches break a promise to keep out of his business and a panicked Lily flees, only to discover the garden she had worked on has been torched. During a fight with his roommates over his spoiled romantic evening, the building suffers the same fate as the garden. A mutual truce between the hapless and now homeless roommates leads the cockroaches to "call in favors from every roach, rat and pigeon in New York City" to try to make amends to Joe. Overnight, the roaches scour New York to gather materials to convert the entire area into a garden and take care of all the necessary paperwork to ensure harmony reigns over all.

== Cast ==
- Jerry O'Connell as Joe F. (Joe's middle name is never said, but it starts with either "F" or '"Ph")
- Megan Ward as Lily Dougherty
- Jim Turner as Walter Shit
- Sandra Denton as Blank
- Robert Vaughn as Senator Dougherty
- Don Ho as Alberto Bianco
- Jim Sterling as Jesus Bianco
- Shiek Mahmud-Bey as Vladimir Bianco
- David Huddleston as P.I. Smith
- Vincent Pastore as apartment broker
- Paul Bartel as NEA scout
- Richard "Moby" Hall as club DJ
- Nick Zedd as customer
- Desiree Casado as girl at play
- Bam Bam Bigelow as construction boss

Cockroach voices

- Rockapella as the Roach Chorus
- Billy West as Ralph
- Reginald Hudlin as Rodney
- Jim Turner
- Kevin Weist
- BD Wong
- Jim Sterling
- Dave Chappelle
- Tim Blake Nelson
- Godfrey
- Rick Aviles
- Corey Burton
- Bam Bam Bigelow

== Production ==
John Payson originally created the short film Joe's Apt. in 1992, which aired on MTV as filler in-between commercial breaks. Payson said he was inspired by a 1987 short film called Those Damn Roaches and the 1987 Japanese film Twilight of the Cockroaches, the latter crossing hand-drawn animation and live action. After the short received a CableACE Award, MTV executives were impressed enough to discuss producing a feature adaptation with Payson. In 1993, MTV made a deal with Geffen Pictures during development to produce films based on the network's properties and release them through Warner Bros. Pictures. While Joe's Apartment was put into production with a $13 million budget, a feature film adaptation of Beavis and Butt-Head was also put into development.

Joe's Apartment was the first feature film Blue Sky Studios was involved in, having previously produced company logos and animated commercials. Under Chris Wedge's supervision, Blue Sky produced animated sequences of the cockroaches. The film also blended them with scenes of puppetry, real cockroaches, and stop-motion animation (including the TV roach porn). Executives at 20th Century Fox were impressed enough with Joe's Apartment to acquire Blue Sky, and eventually the studio became a feature-animation company.

== Reception ==
Even with the enthusiastic billing as "MTV's first feature movie" and the support of the company, Joe's Apartment was a box office bomb when it opened on July 26, 1996. Opening in 1,512 theaters but earning a dismal $1.8 million, the film closed all screenings in the middle of August and finished with only $4.6 million. Warner Bros. sold distribution rights for later MTV Film productions back to MTV's parent company, Viacom, not long after.

Reviews were almost universally negative, mostly distaste at the blending of grimy gross-out gags and up-beat musical humor. Roger Ebert gave the film one star out of four, stating "Joe's Apartment would be a very bad comedy even without the roaches, but it would not be a disgusting one. No, wait: I take that back. Even without the roaches, we would still have the subplot involving the pink disinfectant urinal cakes." On their television show, Ebert's colleague Gene Siskel said he was bored by the nonstop scenes featuring the roaches, and lamented the underdeveloped relationship between Joe and Lily, quipping, "I wanted that romance to be more than just padding between the 'roach clips,' if you will."

Audiences surveyed by CinemaScore gave the film a grade of "B+" on a scale of A+ to F. Joe's Apartment has an approval rating of 21% based on 28 professional reviews on the review aggregator website Rotten Tomatoes, with an average rating of 3.9/10. Its critical consensus reads, "Audiences will want their security deposit back from Joe's Apartment, a lame comedy whose dancing cockroaches are more charming than the human characters."
