= Gregory Lee Kenyon =

American actor

Gregory Lee Kenyon is an American actor who has starred in numerous independent films and plays.

== Career ==
The actor has worked many times with director Sam R. Balcomb who cast him as the lead in the fantasy film Ancanar. This role gained Kenyon a degree of celebrity status among fantasy fans and he was later asked to appear at The Gathering, a Tolkien-themed convention in 2003, where he gave a presentation on Ancanar and signed autographs. In 2005, Kenyon and Balcomb collaborated on Texas Fortune, a zombie short film which won the ZombieFest grand prize. Most recently, the actor-director duo worked together on The Ore, a science fiction film.

Kenyon is also a favorite actor of the writer/director Jay Woelfel who has cast him in four films, Demonicus, Trancers 6, Ghost Lake and Live Evil.

== Filmography ==
- Dawn's Early Light (2000)
- Naked Wishes (2000)
- Unspeakable (2000)
- A Long Road to Travel (2001)
- Demonicus (2001)
- Rogue (2001)
- 9½ (2002)
- Trancers 6 (2002)
- Killers 2: The Beast (2002)
- Seclusion (2002)
- Strange as Angels (2003)
- Saoirse (2003)
- Ghost Lake (2004)
- Texas Fortune (2005)
- Team Extreme (2006)
- The Ore (2007)
- Ancanar (2007)
- Doberman (2007)
- Live Evil (2007)
- The Legend of Zelda Movie Trailer (2008)
