= Biff Manard =

American actor

Biff Manard (c. 1943 – May 19, 2014) was an American actor.

== Background ==
Born in either 1939 or 1943 according to various sources, Manard appeared in several movies and made guest spots on popular TV shows for many decades, such as Officer Michael Francis Murphy on The Flash, but he is perhaps best known for his role as "Hap" Ashby in the low budget science-fiction adventure Trancers, in a supporting role as a washed up baseball player, who is targeted by a psychic assassin from the future. He returned to this role in Trancers II, and in 1985, he also had reunited with co-stars Art LaFleur and Tim Thomerson for the Zone Troopers. Manard died in 2014 in Las Vegas aged 71 after a long illness.

== Filmography ==
=== Film ===
Year	Title	Role	Notes
1971	Machismo: 40 Graves for 40 Guns	Harris Gang	
1974	Shanks	Goliath	
1981	Underground Aces	Pimp	
1981	St. Helens	Dr. Romarantin	
1981	Lunch Wagon	Wino	
1981	Buddy Buddy	Highway Patrolman #2	
1983	Off the Wall	Colonel Fry	
1983	Surf II	Bob's Father	
1984	Trancers	Hap Ashby	
1985	Zone Troopers	Dolan	
1988	The Wrong Guys	Mark Grunski	
1991	Trancers II	Hap Ashby	
1992	Desert Kickboxer	Sheriff Larry	
1994	Blankman	Biff	
1994	Art Deco Detective	Stocking Terrorist	
1996	Snitch	Norman the Drunk	
1997	Eight Days a Week	The Sad Man	
1999	The Incredible Genie	Farrow	

=== Television ===
Year	Title	Role	Notes
1970	Mission: Impossible	Lieutenant Seelik	Episode: "The Amateur"
1971–1972	Bonanza	Scoggins / Hartsfield / Smokey	4 episodes
1976	The Jacksons	Skit characters	1 episode
1976	The Paul Lynde Halloween Special	Biker Wedding Clergy	Television film; also writer
1981	CHiPs	Manager	Episode: "Forty Tons of Trouble"
1981	Pray TV	Billie Bob Joe Brown	Television film
1982	Knots Landing	Drunk	Episode: "The Rose and the Briar"
1982	Father Murphy	Dealer #1	Episode: "Eighty-Eight Keys to Happiness"
1982	Tucker's Witch	Andy	Episode: "Big Mouth"
1988	Star Trek: The Next Generation	Ruffian	Episode: "Elementary, Dear Data"
1990–1991	The Flash	Officer Michael Murphy	17 episodes
1991	Night Court	Mr. Dane	Episode: "Mama Was a Rollin' Stone"
1991	Hunter	Hank Olsen	Episode: "Room Service"
1992	Days of Our Lives	Dr. Dieter Von Leyden	Episode #1.6850
1994	Viper	Security Guard	Episode: "Pilot"
1994	Renegade	Sheriff	Episode: "Dutch on the Run"
1995	Bonanza: Under Attack	Luke	Television film
1995	Full House	Cowpoke	2 episodes
2007	Smith	Jim	Episode: "Four"
