= Alyson Croft =

American actress

- Education: California State University, Chico (AA)
- Occupations: Actress; playwright
- Years active: 1982–present
- Known for: Trancers; Trancers II

Alyson Croft is an American actress. She has been nominated for best Young Artist Award six times, winning it twice during the late 1980s.

== Career ==
Croft is an actress, playwright and producer. She began her career at the age of six years old. She has appeared in commercials, television guest roles and film roles.

Notable film appearances include the role of McNulty's ancestor in Trancers and Trancers II, and Brooke in two episodes of Family Ties. In 2009, she had a brief role on 24.

== Personal life ==
Croft has two associate of arts degrees in 2017 and 2018 from California State University, Chico.

== Filmography ==
=== Film ===
Year	Title	Role	Notes
1982	Deadly Sunday	Shari	Thriller film
1984	Trancers	Baby McNulty (as Allyson Croft)	Action science fiction film
1987	Maid to Order	Lorelei	Fantasy comedy film
1988	Pulse Pounders	Little McNulty (Trancers sequence)	
1988	Trancers: City of Lost Angels	Little McNulty	Short
1991	Trancers II	McNulty	Action horror science fiction film
1996	The Great White Hype	Pretty Young Woman #2	Comedy sports film
2005	Hollywood Horror	Mary	Horror film
2024	Worth A Shot		Short

=== Television ===
Year	Title	Role	Notes
1985	Punky Brewster	Shawna	Episode: "Just Say No"
1986	Highway to Heaven	Wendy Ann Ward	Episode: "Heaven on Earth"
1986	Convicted	Yolanda Forbes	TV film
1986	Cagney & Lacey	Jenny Bard	Episode: "Disenfranchised"
1987	Disneyland	Emily	Episode: "Double Switch"
1987	Family Ties	Brooke	Episode: "It's My Party: Part 1"; Episode: "It's My Party: Part 2"
1987	Small Wonder	Karen Jennings	Episode: "Bride and Groom"
1987-1988	Dallas	Marnie Allen	5 episodes
1988	The Tracey Ullman Show	Andria	1 episode
1988	Blue Skies	Sarah Cobb	
1989	Day by Day	Tracey	Episode: "You Gotta Be a Football Hero"
1989	Peaceable Kingdom		Episode: "Lone Wolf"
1996	Sister, Sister	Regina	Episode: "Big Twin on Campus"
1996	Party of Five	Zoey	Episode: "Going Home"
1998	Damon	Clerk	Episode: "Pilot"
1999	The Pretender	Leslie Johnson	Episode: "Angel's Flight"
1999	Diagnosis: Murder	Jen	Episode: "The Mouth That Roared"
2000	The Others	Taylor	Episode: "1112"
2000	The Practice	Marriage License Clerk	Episode: "Life Sentence"
2000-2001	Bull	Jeannette Frank	Episode: "Amen"
2002	Judging Amy	Lucy Parnell	Episode: "Every Stranger's Face I See"
2003	Miracles	Laurel	Episode: "The Patient"; Episode: "Little Miss Lost"
2003	Strong Medicine	Karen Splenderer	Episode: "Bad Liver"
2006	ER	Gina	Episode: "Out on a Limb"
2006	Smith		Episode: "Three"
2007	McBride: Semper Fi	Officer	TV film
2008	Lincoln Heights	Moira Sussman	3 episodes
2009	24	Meredith Rojas	Episode: "Day 7: 7:00 p.m.-8:00 p.m."
2010	Mad Men	Stacy	Episode: "Public Relations"
2014	Shameless	Frank's RN	Episode: "Emily"
2019-2021	Merli: Sapere Aude	Silvia Montoliu (voice)	16 episodes

== Awards and nominations ==
Year	Award	Category	Nominated work	Results
1986	8th Youth in Film Awards	Exceptional Performance by a Young Actress, Guest Starring in a Television Series: Comedy or Drama	Highway to Heaven (NBC)	Won
1987	9th Youth in Film Awards	Best Young Actress Starring in a Television Drama Special, Movie of the Week or Variety Show	Double Switch (Disney)	Nominated
1987	9th Youth in Film Awards	Best Young Actress Starring in a Television Drama Series	Dallas (CBS)	Nominated
1987	9th Youth in Film Awards	Best Young Actress Guest Starring in a Television Drama Series	Cagney & Lacey (CBS)	Won
1987	9th Youth in Film Awards	Best Young Actress in a Cable Series or Special	The Chicago Seven (HBO)	Nominated
1989	10th Youth in Film Awards	Best Young Actress in a Nighttime Drama Series	Blue Skies (CBS)	Nominated
