= C. Courtney Joyner =

American actor

- Born: United States
- Occupations: Author, screenwriter, director, journalist, actor
- Relatives: Allison Mackie (cousin)

C. Courtney Joyner is an American author, screenwriter, director, journalist and actor. He is the cousin of actress Allison Mackie.

== Author ==
Among the books he has written are Shotgun, a western set in the 1880s, Six Guns and Sleigh Bells and Two Bit Kill. He is a regular columnist for True West Magazine and regularly contributes to The Round-Up, Western Writers of America's monthly magazine. He has twice been nominated for the Peacemaker award for Best Short Story. At one of the Western Writers of America conferences, chairman Paul Andrew Hutton and Johnny Boggs presented Joyner with an award for "Outstanding Service to Western Writers of America".

In March 2021, Joyner appeared on episode 8 of The Ghost of Hollywood radio show to discuss his work on the film Class of 1999.

== Bibliography ==
=== Books ===
- The Westerners: Interviews with Actors, Directors, Writers (2009)
- Hell Comes to Hollywood: An Anthology of Short Horror Fiction Set in Tinseltown (2012, contributor)
- The Peacemakers, Volume 3 (2013, contributor)
- The Peacemakers, Volume 4 (2013, contributor)
- Shotgun (2013)
- Shotgun: The Bleeding Ground (2016)
- Nemo Rising (2017)
- These Violent Times: A Shotgun Western (2018)
- My Favorite Horror Movie (2025)

=== Short stories ===
- "Bloodhound" (in A Fistful of Legends, 2009)
- "Two-Bit Kill" (in The Law of the Gun, 2010) – Nominated, Best Short Story of the Year 2010, Western Fictioneers
- "Universal Killer" (in Beat to a Pulp, Vol. 2, 2012)

=== Graphic novels and comics ===
- "I Kill the Dead" (in Wicked West 2: Abomination, 2007)
- The Saga of Billy the Kid (2012)

== Filmography ==
=== As director ===
- Trancers III (1992) (Video)
- Lurking Fear (1994)
- Tomb of Terror (2004) (video segment 2: "Infinite Evil")
- Bunker of Blood Chapter 5 – Psycho Sideshow: Demon Freaks (2018) (Video)
- Bunker of Blood Chapter 6 – Zombie Lust: Night Flesh (2018) (Video)

=== Audio commentary ===
- Grand Duel (2013, Blue Underground)
- The Big Gundown (2013, Blu-ray)
- Compañeros (2014, Blu-ray)
- Mystery Science Theater 3000: XXX (2014 DVD box set, for the "making of" feature for The Black Scorpion)
- Broken Arrow (2018, Plan B, Blu-ray)
- The Ghost of Hollywood (2021; Episode 8: "Class of 1999")

=== As actor ===
- Murphy's Law (1986, as Bar Patron)
- The Flesh Merchant (1993, as Chick)
- Iron Thunder (1998, as Mark)
- Dead Time Tales (1998, as 3rd DiCaprio Hitman)
- A Friendly Game of Cutthroats (1998, as Mr. Kester)
- Scream Queen (2002, as Detective Hammer)
- Decadent Evil (2005, uncredited)
- Cry of the Mummy (2004, as Lab Tech #2)

=== As writer ===
- The Offspring (1987)
- Prison (1988, screenplay)
- Vietnam, Texas (1990)
- Class of 1999 (1990)
- Puppet Master III: Toulon's Revenge (1991)
- Doctor Mordrid (1992, screenplay)
- Trancers III (1992, screenplay)
- Distant Cousins (1993, screenplay and story)
- Lurking Fear (1994)
- Rolling Stones: Voodoo Lounge (1995, video game script)
- Public Enemies (1996)
- Veronica 2030 (1999, teleplay)
- Nautilus (2000)
- Guilty as Charged (2000)
- Devil's Prey (2001, screenplay)
- Instinct to Kill (2001)
- Trancers 6 (2002, as Gene Yarbrough)
- Full Moon Fright Night (2002)
- Mega Scorpions (2003, as Gene Yarbrough)
- Lady Jayne: Killer (2003, screenplay)
- Stealing Candy (2003, screenplay)
- White Rush (2003)
- Puppet Master: The Legacy (2003, additional material, as Gene Yarbrough)
- Tomb of Terror (2004, segments Lurking Fear, 2, Infinite Evil)
- Slammed (2004)
- Puppet Master vs Demonic Toys (2004, as Courtney Joyner)
