= Handmann =

Handmann is a German surname. Notable people with the surname include:

- Jakob Emanuel Handmann (1718–1781), Swiss painter
- Rudolf Handmann (1862–1940), Swiss pastor, professor, theologian, and biblical scholar
