= Telma Hopkins =

American actress and pop singer (born 1948)

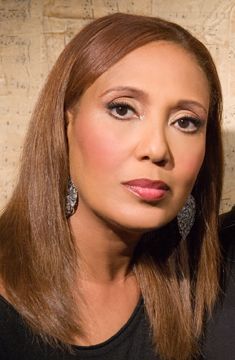
- Hopkins in 2008
- Born: Telma Louise Hopkins; October 28, 1948 (age 77); Louisville, Kentucky, U.S.
- Occupations: Actress; singer
- Years active: 1967–present
- Known for: Bosom Buddies; Gimme a Break! Family Matters; Half & Half
- Spouse: Donald B. Allen (m. 1970; div. 1977)
- Children: 1

Telma Louise Hopkins (born October 28, 1948) is an American actress and pop singer. Hopkins rose to prominence as a member of the pop group Tony Orlando and Dawn, who had several number-one songs. She also performed on the CBS variety show Tony Orlando and Dawn from 1974 until 1976 along with Tony Orlando and Joyce Vincent Wilson. In the late 1970s, Hopkins began working as an actress, playing roles on various sitcoms. In the 1980s-1990s, Hopkins held longer-running sitcom roles as Isabelle Hammond on Bosom Buddies (1980–82), Adelaide "Addy" Wilson on Gimme a Break! (1983–87) and Family Matters (1989–97) as Rachel Baines–Crawford.

As lead actress, Hopkins starred on Getting By from 1993 to 1994. In recent years, Hopkins was a regular cast member on Half & Half (2002–06) portraying Phyllis Thorne, Are We There Yet? (2010–13), and short-lived Partners (2014). In film, Hopkins co-starred in 1984 science fiction film Trancers and in its sequels Trancers II (1991) and Trancers III (1992), as well as appearing in The Wood (1999) and The Love Guru (2008).

== Early life ==
Hopkins was born on October 28, 1948, in Louisville, Kentucky to Louise (Kinkaid). Hopkins was raised by her grandmother in Highland Park, Michigan, a city located in the Metro Detroit area. Lacking an interest in acting during her childhood, she decided to pursue her dreams of singing.

== Career ==
=== Music ===
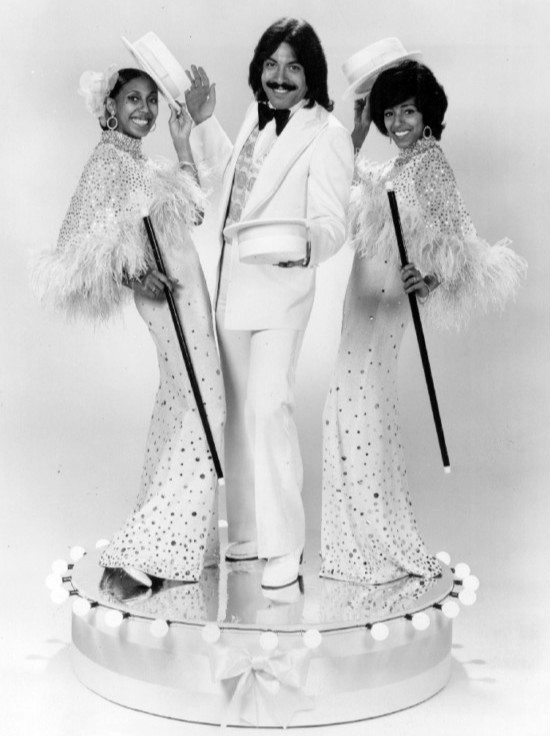
Hopkins (left) with Tony Orlando and Dawn, 1974.

Hopkins started her career as a background singer in Detroit, singing background on Golden World, Motown, Invictus Records, and Hot Wax Records hits. She appeared on such classics as Freda Payne's "Band of Gold" and Isaac Hayes' "Theme from Shaft" and working with legendary artists like the Four Tops and Marvin Gaye.

Hopkins and Joyce Vincent Wilson were recruited by Tony Orlando to form the vocal group Dawn. As a recording act, Tony Orlando and Dawn would have much success throughout the first half of the 1970s, releasing 16 top-40 singles, three of which reached #1, and starring in a CBS variety show (titled Tony Orlando and Dawn) from 1974 to 1976. In 1977, Tony Orlando and Dawn announced their retirement.

=== Television and film ===
In 1979, Hopkins made her acting debut playing Daisy in the ABC miniseries Roots: The Next Generations. Later that year, she co-starred alongside Eileen Brennan on the short-lived ABC sitcom A New Kind of Family. The following year, she was cast opposite Tom Hanks and Peter Scolari in another ABC sitcom, Bosom Buddies. The series was cancelled in 1982 after two seasons.

In 1983, Hopkins joined the cast of NBC sitcom Gimme a Break! starring Nell Carter. She played Adelaide "Addy" Wilson, Nell's childhood friend, until the series finale in 1987.

In 1989, Hopkins began starring as Rachel Baines-Crawford, the younger sister of Harriette Winslow (in reality, Hopkins was two years older than Jo Marie Payton), in the ABC sitcom Family Matters. She left the series after four seasons as a regular cast member, to star (with Cindy Williams) as the co-lead of the sitcom Getting By which aired for two seasons (one on ABC, the other on NBC) from 1993 to 1994. She later returned to Family Matters, making recurring appearances in the sixth season and guest-starring in the Season 9 Christmas episode "Deck the Malls" in 1997.

In later years, she appeared as Richard T. Jones' mother in the romantic comedy The Wood (1999), and played Romany Malco's mother in the comedy film The Love Guru (2008). She appeared in JD Lawrence's stage play The Clean Up Woman in October 2008.

From 2002 to 2006, she starred in the UPN sitcom Half & Half alongside Rachel True, Essence Atkins and Valarie Pettiford. She also had recurring roles on The Hughleys and Any Day Now. From 2010 to 2013, she co-starred alongside Terry Crews and Essence Atkins in the TBS sitcom Are We There Yet?.

In 2014, she played Martin Lawrence's mother on the FX sitcom Partners. In 2016, she was cast as Jerrika Hinton's mother in the ABC comedy pilot Toast, produced by ShondaLand.

In May 2021, it was announced Hopkins had been cast in the role of Denise Tolliver on The Young and the Restless, reuniting her with Family Matters co-star Bryton James.

== Personal life and other work ==
Hopkins was married to Donald B. Allen from 1970 until 1977. Together, they have a son.

She often volunteers for charitable causes. She has worked with Caring for Babies with AIDS, Act on Arthritis and the Parent–teacher association. She also mentors children.

== Filmography ==
=== Film ===
Year	Title	Role	Notes
1982	The Kid with the Broken Halo	Gail Desautel	Television film
1984	Trancers	Ruth "Ruthie" Raines	
1988	Pulse Pounders	Ruth "Ruthie" Raines	Cameo
1990	Vital Signs	Dr. Kennan	
1990	How to Murder a Millionaire	Teresa	
1991	Trancers II	Ruth "Ruthie" Raines	
1992	Trancers III	Ruth "Ruthie" Raines	
1999	The Wood	Mrs. Hightower	
2001	Down to Earth	Woman in Audience	Cameo
2001	Rain		Short film
2008	The Love Guru	Lillian Roanoke	
2013	Trancers: City of Lost Angels	Ruth "Ruthie" Raines	Short film
2015	Welcome to the Family	Deborah	Television film
2018	Running out of Time	Dolly	
2021	The Matrix Resurrections	Freya	
2024	Brewster's Millions: Christmas	Mrs. Brewster	

=== Television ===
Year	Title	Role	Notes
1974–76	Tony Orlando and Dawn	Herself	
1979	Roots: The Next Generations	Daisy	Miniseries
1979	Marie	K.C. Jones	Episode: "Pilot"
1979–80	A New Kind of Family	Jess Ashton	Series regular, 5 episodes
1980–82	Bosom Buddies	Isabelle Hammond	Series regular, 37 episodes
1982–83	The New Odd Couple	Frances	2 episodes
1984	Fantasy Island	Doris Wilson	Episode: "Bojangles and the Dancer/Deuces Are Wild"
1979–85	The Love Boat	Various	4 episodes
1983–87	Gimme a Break!	Addy Wilson	Series regular, 68 episodes
1986–87	Rosie	Joanne Dele Green	3 episodes
1988	Amen	Charlotte Holloway	Episode: "Wedding Bell Blues"
1989–97	Family Matters	Rachel Crawford	Series regular
1993–94	Getting By	Dolores Dixon	Series regular
1995	Women of the House	Officer Rhoda	Episode: "The Conjugal Cottage"
1996	Spider-Man: The Animated Series	Ms. Farrell	Voice, episode: "Rocket Racer"
1997	The Nanny	Lila Baker	Episode: "Fran's Roots"
1998	ER	Carlene	Episode: "Think Warm Thoughts"
1999	Batman Beyond	Mrs. Gibson	Voice, episode: "Hooked Up"
1999–2001	The Hughleys	Paulette Williams	5 episodes
2000	Histeria!	Rosa Parks	Voice, episode: "Heroes of Truth and Justice"
2000	Static Shock	Mrs. Barnett	Voice, episode: "The Breed"
2000	Suddenly Susan	Denise	Episode: "The Reversal"
2000–01	Any Day Now	Judge Wilma Evers	4 episodes
2001	For Your Love	Miss Hope	Episode: "The Next Best Thing"
2002–06	Half & Half	Phyllis Thorne	Series regular
2008	Psych	Phylis Gaffney	Episode: "There's Something About Mira"
2010–13	Are We There Yet?	Marilyn Persons	Series regular
2013	Getting On	Beverly Raymes	Episode: "Born on the Fourth of July"
2014	Partners	Ruth Jackson	Series regular
2012–14	Lab Rats	Grandma Rose Dooley	3 episodes
2015	K.C. Undercover	Miss Holley	Episode: "Debutante Baller"
2016	2 Broke Girls	Pilar	Episode: "And the Rom-Commie"
2019–22	Dead to Me	Yolanda	5 episodes
2019	The Loud House	Maybelle	Voice, 2 episodes
2019–22	Family Reunion	Maybelle	Recurring role
2019–22	The Casagrandes	Maybelle	Voice, recurring role
2021	The Young and the Restless	Denise Tolliver	5 episodes
2021	Rugrats	Celeste	Voice, episode: "Goodbye Reptar"
2023	Not Dead Yet	Susie Irving	Episode: "Not Well Yet"
2024	That Girl Lay Lay	G-Ma Marguerite	Episode: "Granny Fae Fae's Back to Play Play"
2025	Clean Slate	Ella	Main role
