= Velvet Rhodes =

American actress

- Born: Patricia Laura Adams; August 16, 1949; Los Angeles, California
- Died: July 25, 2020 (aged 70); Glendale, California, U.S.
- Occupation(s): Actress, producer, director

Velvet Rhodes (born Patricia Laura Adams; August 16, 1949 in Los Angeles, California-July 25, 2020 in Glendale, California), was an American actress, director, producer, musician, rock and theater critic, travel agent, advertising agent, and sales manager for a moving and storage company. In 1980, she was the Amazon Supreme of the Society for the Promulgation and Encouragement of Amazon Conduct and Attitude, an organization in Orange County, California that was based on the guiding principle of female superiority. Rhodes' papers and others related to the history of the organization from 1970 to 1990 are located at the University of California at Berkeley in Berkeley, California. The organization was devoted to kink. Rhodes has been called a sex worker and Amazon Supreme. Most of the letters to the organization that are preserved in the collection were from men interested in joining the organization and in serving and being dominated by Rhodes or other women who were members. Men who joined the organization were trained and advanced through four levels of membership, from aspirant to novitiate to initiate to chevalier. The original Amazons were a legendary Ancient Greek tribe of female warriors who governed themselves and associated with males only to reproduce.
