= Art LaFleur =

American actor (1943–2021)

- Born: September 9, 1943; Gary, Indiana, U.S.
- Died: November 17, 2021 (aged 78); North Hollywood, California, U.S.
- Occupation: Actor
- Years active: 1978–2017
- Children: 2

Art LaFleur (September 9, 1943 – November 17, 2021) was an American character actor and acting coach.

== Life and career ==
LaFleur was born in Gary, Indiana. He played football in 1962 as a redshirt at the University of Kentucky under Coach Charlie Bradshaw as chronicled in a 2007 book, The Thin Thirty. He was a sportscaster on ESPN and on CBS.

LaFleur had many guest-starring roles on television series, including Angel and JAG. In 1983, he was cast in the ABC sitcom pilot Another Ballgame alongside Alex Karras and Susan Clark. The series went through many development changes before its fall premiere, with Emmanuel Lewis being added to the show and LaFleur being dropped from the regular cast. Once the final change to the series title was made (to Webster), LaFleur was kept only as a guest star in the pilot.

In 1993, LaFleur played baseball player Babe Ruth in The Sandlot. He had another notable role as the eccentric and obsessive character Red Sweeney (Silver Fox), in the 1995 family comedy film Man of the House. He also appeared in one episode of the television series M*A*S*H, in season 9 ("Father’s Day”) as an MP, looking for the people responsible for a stolen side of beef. LaFleur played US Army soldier, Mittens in the 1985 science fiction film Zone Troopers.

In addition to playing Babe Ruth, LaFleur also appeared as baseball player Chick Gandil of 1919 Black Sox infamy, in Field of Dreams. In terms of military and national security film roles he appeared as the White House's security chief in Disney's First Kid (1996), as "McNulty" in both Trancers (1985), Trancers II (1991) and as 1st Sgt. Brandon T. Williams in In the Army Now (1994). He played pilot, Jack Neely in Air America (1990), appeared as Banes in The Replacements (2000) and in Beethoven's 4th (2001) as Sergeant Rutledge. He also played Red Sweeney in Disney's “Man of the House” in 1995.

LaFleur played a coach for the New York Yankees in the 1992 film, Mr. Baseball. He also appeared in The Santa Clause 2 in 2002 and The Santa Clause 3: The Escape Clause in 2006, as the Tooth Fairy. In 2005, he appeared in Hostage as a deputy to Bruce Willis' sheriff. In 2009, he appeared in the Direct-to-DVD film Ace Ventura Jr: Pet Detective and in the Science-Fiction horror film The Rig.

LaFleur also appeared on a House M.D. episode in 2005, as Warner Fitch, in "Sports Medicine." He also appeared on Home Improvement as Jimbo in season 1 episode 7 "Nothing More Than Feelings."

The Gary SouthShore RailCats, LaFleur's hometown professional baseball team recognized him with a special bobblehead and first pitch ceremony on July 20, 2019.

LaFleur died from atypical Parkinson's disease on November 17, 2021, at the age of 78.

== Filmography ==
Year	Title	Role	Notes
1978	Rescue from Gilligan's Island	Ivan	TV movie
1980	The Hollywood Knights	Thomas	
1980	Any Which Way You Can	Baggage Man #2	
1980	M*A*S*H	M.P.	Season 9 Episode 4 "Father's Day"
1982	Cannery Row	Doorman	
1982	Lois Gibbs and the Love Canal	Homeowner	TV movie
1982	I Ought to Be in Pictures	Baseball Fan	
1982	In the Custody of Strangers	Clifford	TV movie
1982	Two of a Kind	Cook	TV movie
1982	Jekyll and Hyde... Together Again	Clock Repairman	
1983	Sometimes I Wonder	Joe	TV movie
1983	The Invisible Woman	Phil	TV movie
1983	Who Will Love My Children?	Krause	TV movie
1983	WarGames	Sergeant Ginzberg	
1983	Emergency Room	Colon	TV movie
1984	Unfaithfully Yours	Desk Sergeant	
1984	Sins of the Past		TV movie
1984	Boys in Blue	Stanley Singleton	TV movie
1984	City Heat	'Bruiser'	
1985	Trancers	McNulty	
1985	The Man with One Red Shoe	CIA Agent	
1985	Zone Troopers	Mittens	
1986	The Fifth Missile	'Animal' Meslinsky	TV movie
1986	A Winner Never Quits	John Stewart	TV movie
1986	Cobra	Captain Sears	
1986	Say Yes	Ernest	
1986	Little Spies	Sergeant Westwood	TV movie
1986	Penalty Phase	Pete Pavlovich	TV movie
1987	Rampage	Mel Sanderson	
1987	The Three Kings		TV movie
1987	Scarecrow and Mrs. King	Rodney Hobart	Season 4 Episode 18 "One Flew East"
1988	The Wrong Guys	Woody Winslow	
1988	The Blob	Pharmacist / Mr. Penny	
1989	Field of Dreams	Chick Gandil	
1990	Keaton's Cop	Detective Ed Hayes	
1990	Air America	Jack Neely	
1990	Death Warrant	Sergeant DeGraf	
1991	Oscar	Officer Quinn	
1991	Trancers II	Old McNulty	
1991	Acting Sheriff	Captain Van Patten	TV movie
1991	Home Improvement	Jim	Season 1 Episode 7 "Nothing More Than Feelings"
1992	Live! From Death Row	Lockart	TV movie
1992	Doogie Howser, M.D.	Shooting Range Instructor	Season 4 Episode 3 "Doogie Got a Gun"
1992	Mr. Baseball	Skip	
1992	Forever Young	Alice's Father	
1993	Jack the Bear	Mr. Festinger	
1993	The Sandlot	Babe Ruth	
1994	Maverick	Poker Player	
1994	In the Army Now	1st Sergeant Brandon T. Williams	
1995	Man of the House	"Red" Sweeney	
1996	First Kid	Secret Service Agent Morton	
1997	Running Time	Warden	
1997	Hijacking Hollywood	Eddie	
1997	Lewis and Clark and George	Fred	
1998	The Garbage Picking Field Goal Kicking Philadelphia Phenomenon	Gus Rogenheimer	TV movie
1998	The Magnificent Seven	Warden	Episode: "Inmate 78"
1998	Best of the Best 4: Without Warning	'Big Joolie'	Direct-to-video
1998	The Tony Danza Show	Mr. Paxton	Episode: "Vision Quest"
1999	Last Chance	Jimmy	
1999	Tycus	Shyler	Direct-to-video
1999	Boy Meets World	Bill	Season 6 Episode 15 "Road Trip"
2000	JAG	Vice Admiral Richard Kern	Episode: "Cabin Pressure"
2000	The Replacements	Banes	
2001	Beethoven's 4th	Sergeant Rutledge	Direct-to-video
2002	The Santa Clause 2	Tooth Fairy	
2003	Las Vegas	Club Owner	Season 5 Episode 7
2004	A Cinderella Story	Football Coach	
2004	Breaking the Fifth	Abraham Polinsky	
2005	Malcolm in the Middle	Fred	1 episode
2005	Hostage	Officer Bill Jorgenson	
2005	McBride: Tune in for Murder	Armen	TV movie
2005	House M.D.	Warner Fitch	"Sports Medicine"
2006	The Santa Clause 3: The Escape Clause	Tooth Fairy	
2007	Shiloh Falls	Sheriff	
2008	Bad Guys	Shep	
2008	Speed Racer	Fuji Announcer	
2009	War Wolves	Leo	TV movie
2009	Ace Ventura Jr: Pet Detective	Russell Hollander	Direct-to-video
2009	The Mentalist	Detective Louis Earlen	Episode: "Red Bulls"
2010	Illegal	Agent Wallace	
2010	The Rig	Ken Fleming	
2010	Dahmer vs. Gacy	Dr. Hess	
2012	Bring Me the Head of Lance Henriksen	Art	
2012	Ben and Kate	Mr. Carlson	1 episode
2012–2013	Have You Met Miss Jones?	Lou 'Limo Lou'	2 episodes
2013	House Hunting	Don Thomson	
2013	A Snow Globe Christmas	Mr. Barns	TV movie
2015	Key and Peele	Father	1 episode
2016	The Last Treasure Hunt	Robert Sinclair	Voice role
2017	Dive	Dad	Final role
