= Trancers =

1985 film by Charles Band

- Theatrical release poster
- Directed by: Charles Band
- Written by: Danny Bilson; Paul De Meo
- Produced by: Charles Band
- Starring: Tim Thomerson; Helen Hunt; Michael Stefani; Art LaFleur; Telma Hopkins; Richard Herd; Anne Seymour
- Cinematography: Mac Ahlberg
- Edited by: Ted Nicolaou
- Music by: Phil Davies; Mark Ryder
- Distributed by: Empire Pictures
- Release dates: November 7, 1984 (U.K.); May 22, 1985 (U.S.)
- Running time: 76 minutes
- Country: United States
- Language: English

Trancers (also released as Future Cop) is a 1984 American science fiction action film directed by Charles Band and starring Tim Thomerson, Helen Hunt, and Art LaFleur. It is the first film in the Trancers series. Thomerson plays Jack Deth, a Philip Marlowe-esque police detective from the 23rd century who travels to the 1980s to bring his old nemesis to justice. The film portrays a unique method of time travel: people can travel back in time by injecting themselves with a drug that allows them to take over the body of an ancestor.

== Plot ==
Jack Deth is a retired police trooper in the 23rd century who has been called back into service to assist in hunting down Martin Whistler, a criminal mastermind who uses psychic powers to turn people into mindless "Trancers" and carry out his orders. Deth can identify a tranced individual by scanning them with a special bracelet. All trancers appear as normal humans at first, but once triggered, they become savage killers with twisted features.

Before he can be caught, Whistler escapes back in time using a drug-induced time-traveling technique. Whistler's consciousness travels down his ancestral bloodline, arrives in 1985, and takes over the body of a Los Angeles police detective named Weisling. Once Deth discovers what Whistler has done, he destroys Whistler's body—effectively leaving him trapped in the past with no vessel to return to—and chases after him through time the same way. Deth ends up in the body of one of his ancestors: a journalist named Phil Dethton.

With the help of Phil's date from the night before—a punk rock girl named Leena—Deth goes after Whistler, who has begun to "trance" other victims. Whistler plots to eliminate the future governing council members of Angel City (the future name of Los Angeles), who are being systematically wiped out of existence by Whistler's murder spree of their ancestors. Deth arrives too late to prevent most of the murders and can only safeguard Hap Ashby, a washed-up former pro baseball player, who is the ancestor of the last surviving council member, Chairman Ashe.

Deth is given some high-tech equipment, which is sent to him in the past: his sidearm (which contains two hidden vials of time drugs to send him and Whistler back to the future) and a "long-second" wristwatch, which temporarily slows time, stretching one second to 10. The watch has only enough power for one use, but he later receives another watch.

During the end fight with Whistler, one of the drug vials in Jack's gun breaks, leaving only one vial to get home. Jack is forced to make a choice: kill the innocent Weisling (who is possessed by the evil Whistler), or use the vial to send Whistler back to 2247, which would strand Jack in the present. Jack chooses to inject Weisling with the vial, saving the lieutenant's life but condemning Whistler to an eternity without a body to return to. Jack decides to remain with Leena in 1985, although observing him from the shadows is McNulty, his boss from the future, who has traveled down his own ancestral line, ending up in the body of a young girl.

== Cast ==
- Tim Thomerson as Trooper Jack Deth / Phil Dethton
- Michael Stefani as Martin Whistler / Detective Weisling
- Helen Hunt as Leena
- Art LaFleur as Detective McNulty (credited as Art La Fleur)
- Biff Manard as Hap Ashby
- Richard Herd as Chairman Spencer
- Telma Hopkins as Ruthie Raines, The Engineer
- Anne Seymour as Chairman Margaret Ashe
- Peter Schrum as Santa Claus
- Alyson Croft as "Baby" McNulty (credited as Allyson Croft)
- Barbara Perry as Mrs. Santa Claus
- Richard Erdman as Drunken Wise Man
- Wiley Harker as Dapper Old Man
- Miguel Fernandes as Officer Lopez

== Production ==
The idea of the film came from the producer's admiration of Humphrey Bogart's work.

== Reception ==
On Rotten Tomatoes the film has an approval rating of 83% based on reviews from 6 critics. Variety described it as having a similar premise to The Terminator but falling short of that film. Kevin Thomas of the Los Angeles Times instead called it "a textbook example of efficient, effective exploitation film making."

Neil Gaiman reviewed Trancers for Imagine magazine, and stated that it was "funny, comic-book, and fun, I enjoyed it immensely."

Creature Feature gave the movie two stars, finding the story a mess but noted that some of the sequels are better.

Thomerson preferred this film to the sequels finding it more visceral and character driven.

The Encyclopedia of Science Fiction found that while it is an action film, it has many science fiction ideas and an interesting punk look.

The Conway Daily Sun praised the film, especially Thomerson's and Hunt's performances.

James Cameron reportedly enjoyed the film and began recommending Danny Bilson and Paul DeMeo for other projects.

== Home media ==
Trancers was released on VHS and LaserDisc in 1985, DVD in 2000, and Blu-ray in 2014.

On October 18, 2022, a two-disc collector's edition of the film was released on 4K Ultra HD Blu-ray, containing the director's commentary, the Trancers: City of Lost Angels short, behind-the-scenes, and more.

A black and white version of the film was released on February 7, 2025.

== Sequels ==
The film spawned five direct-to-video sequels: Trancers II (1991), Trancers III (1992), Trancers 4: Jack of Swords (1994), Trancers 5: Sudden Deth (1994), and Trancers 6 (2002).

== Short film ==
Additionally, Trancers: City of Lost Angels was shot in between the first and second films. The 20-minute short was a part of the unreleased 1988 anthology film Pulse Pounders, but was released separately on DVD in 2013. The film has since started a franchise of six main films.
