= Gary Levinsohn =

American film producer (born 1959)

- Born: 1959 (age 66–67); South Africa
- Occupation: Film producer

Gary Levinsohn is an American film producer. He was nominated for the Academy Award for Best Picture, along with Steven Spielberg, Ian Bryce, Mark Gordon for the film Saving Private Ryan. He is the co-owner of Mutual Film Company.

== Filmography ==
He was a producer in all films unless otherwise noted.

=== Film ===
Year	Film	Credit
1992	Blue Ice	Executive producer
1993	The Real McCoy	Executive producer
1995	Angus	Executive producer
1995	12 Monkeys	Executive producer
1997	The Relic	Executive producer
1997	The Jackal	Executive producer
1998	Hard Rain	
1998	Paulie	
1998	Black Dog	Executive producer
1998	Saving Private Ryan	
1998	A Simple Plan	Executive producer
1999	Virus	Executive producer
1999	It's the Rage	Executive producer
2000	Isn't She Great	Executive producer
2000	The Patriot	
2003	Timeline	Executive producer
2005	Casanova	Executive producer
2005	Life of the Party	Executive producer
2006	Snakes on a Plane	
2006	The Hoax	Executive producer
2012	Deadfall	
2012	Jack Reacher	
2017	Broken Memories	Executive producer
2022	Marlowe	

=== Television ===
Year	Title	Credit	Notes
1997	The Ripper	Executive producer	Television film
2003	And Starring Pancho Villa as Himself	Co-executive producer	Television film
2019	The Stranded	Executive producer	

== Awards and nominations ==
In 1999, Gary Levinsohn, along with Steven Spielberg, Ian Bryce and Mark Gordon, was nominated for Academy Award and BAFTA Film Award for Saving Private Ryan, for the category of Best Picture and Best Film respectively. Saving Private Ryan won him Best Drama Picture at 1999 Online Film & Television Association Film Award and 2nd place in Best Motion Picture at Awards Circuit Community Awards. Levinsohn, along with Mark Gordon, Allison Lyon Segan and John Roberts, won BAFTA Children's Award for the film Paulie in the same year. In 2016, Levinsohn, along with Michael Worth, Kassi Crews and Dennis Ho, won an Award of Merit Special Mention at the Accolade Competition for the film Broken Memories.
