= Polanski Unauthorized =

- Directed by: Damian Chapa
- Written by: Damian Chapa; Carlton Holder
- Produced by: Damian Chapa; Michael Chapa; Edmund Druilhet; Melissa Mullins; Silvia Šuvadová
- Starring: Damian Chapa; Leah Grimsson; Tom Druilhet; Brienne De Beau; Silvia Šuvadová; Christian Serritiello
- Cinematography: Pierre Chemaly
- Music by: Mark Buys; Dariusz Kowalczyk; Vladimir Martinka
- Distributed by: Walking Shadows
- Release date: 2009
- Language: English

Polanski Unauthorized is a theatrically released biographical film about the life of film director Roman Polanski. It opened in Los Angeles in February 2009 and was released on DVD in July 2009.

== Background ==
The film was financed, written and directed by Chapa with him playing the part of the film's main character. Having already done research on Polanski and becoming interested in the subject, Chapa cited an incident that gave him inspiration. He was in a coffee shop with some artists who were having an argument about Polanski with then expressing their different thoughts on him. He thought to himself that it was time for a biopic on such a controversial figure.

The film was actually made the year prior to Polanski's arrest. It premiered at the Majestic Crest Theatre in Westwood, California on April 23, 2008. David Carradine was one of the attendees.

== Cast ==
- Damian Chapa as Roman Polanski
- Kevin De Ridder as Young Roman Polanski
- Thomas Druilhet as Anton LaVey / The Devil
- Brienne De Beau as Sharon Tate
- Leah Grimsson as 13-year-old girl
- Silvia Šuvadová as Bula Polanski
- Christian Serritiello as Ryszard Polanski
- Paul James Saunders as Eugene Gatowski
- Raf Menton as Nazi Soldier
- Elena Talon as Mia Farrow
- Charles Power as Frank Sinatra
- Gilbert Azafrani as Attorney Douglas Dalton
- Monica Ramon as Spanish woman
- Robert McAtee as Hugh Hefner
- Pierre Chemaly as William A. Fraker
- Jeff McCredie as Phil Van Natter - Detective #1
- Justin Shell as Detective # 2
- Charles Berg as Bryan Hobbs - Detective #3
- Tony Wilde as Photographer #1
- Derek Johnson as Photographer # 2
- Kerry Winchester as Martin Ransohoff
- Anthony J. Hilder as Sharon's bodyguard
- Antoine Janssens as Nazi Soldier #2
- Lodi Greens as Nazi Soldier #3
- Johnny Gooding as Mob #1
- Jeff Langton as Frankie Carbo - Mob #2
- Kathy Quintiens as Raped girl
- Jeffrey Hekker as Village boy
- André Bracke as Judge
- Franasois Leemans as Gunson
- Maria De Meyer as Grandmother
- Arthur Patching as Polish farmer
- Edmund Druilhet as 1st MP
- Johnny Muj as 2nd MP
- Adam Dunstan as Victim
- Dana Fares as Nurse Burdette
- Mario L. Metini as Attorney
- Tim Mars as Time Magazine journalist
- Kathleen Gregory as Susan Atkins
- Brian McArdle as John Cassavetes
- Brian Brazil as Police officer
- Victor Girone as Douglas Dalton
- Madla Hruza as Wardrobe lady
- Nasia Jansen as Monica
- Ion Muj as German soldier
- Sonya Rome as Underage hooker
- Justin Ross as Drunk
