= Catfish Blues =

Catfish Blues may refer to:

- "Catfish Blues" (song), a blues song first recorded by American musician Robert Petway
- Catfish Blues (film), a 2016 American film
