= Tim Thomerson =

American actor (born 1946)

- Born: Joseph Timothy Thomerson; April 8, 1946 (age 80); Coronado, California, U.S.
- Occupations: Actor, comedian
- Years active: 1975–present
- Spouse: Teri Blythe

Joseph Timothy Thomerson (born April 8, 1946) is an American actor and comedian. He is best known for his role as Jack Deth in the Trancers film series, his work in numerous low-budget features, and his comedic television roles. He appeared in the films Uncommon Valor, Air America, Volunteers, Who's Harry Crumb?, Iron Eagle, and Fear and Loathing in Las Vegas.

== Early life ==
Tim Thomerson was born in Coronado, California. He was brought up in both Hawaii and in San Diego. Following a stint in the Army National Guard, where he served as a cook in a tank company with actor Brion James, Thomerson chose to become an actor while taking a job as a set builder and prop man at San Diego's Old Globe Theatre, famous for its Shakespearean productions.

Following college, Thomerson began a career as a stand-up comedian, honing his skills. He appeared in comedy clubs, including The Bitter End in Greenwich Village, The Improv in Los Angeles, and Catch a Rising Star in New York City.

== Career ==
=== Initial success ===
Thomerson entered the world of stand-up comedy in the 1970s. In Los Angeles, he became a regular at The Comedy Store and the Improv and made numerous appearances on television variety shows and in Las Vegas.

One of Thomerson's early acting breaks came from director Robert Altman who, after seeing Thomerson's stand-up act, cast him in the film A Wedding. Thomerson first came to prominence in the short-lived comedy science-fiction TV series, Quark in 1977–78, as Gene/Jean, a character of dual gender who randomly switched between the two.

=== Feature film actor ===
Thomerson began a long career in television and film starting in the mid-1970s, starting with roles such as the criminal psychologist Jerry Moriarity in the slasher film, Fade to Black (1980) before moving on to starring roles such as the time-traveling future cop Jack Deth in the 1985 low-budget science-fiction film, Trancers.

In 1986, Thomerson reunited with a few of his Trancers co-stars for the World War II science-fiction film, Zone Troopers; he also appeared in the vampire film, Near Dark, and played a villain opposite Melanie Griffith's heroine in the science-fiction film, Cherry 2000. He also appeared in NBC's television film, The Incredible Hulk Returns (1988) as the Hulk's opponent, Jack LeBeau.

When Charles Band started Full Moon Features in the late 1980s, one of his first projects was the sequel Trancers II (1991), in which he reunited Thomerson with much of the cast from the first film. Thomerson would later appear in each of the sequels, except for Trancers 6.

Another notable film role was that of Brick Bardo in Dollman (1991), a Dirty Harry-like alien cop who is only 13 inches (33 cm) tall; the character also appeared briefly in Bad Channels and more substantially in Dollman vs. Demonic Toys

In the 1990s, he was a series regular on the TV police drama, Sirens, followed by a regular, co-starring role on the series, Land's End. In 1995 he played hi-jacker Mitch Bolton in Walker, Texas Ranger

== Filmography ==
Year	Film	Role	Other notes
1975	Mannix	'Rusty'	Episode: "A Word Called Courage"
1975	A Shadow in the Streets	Chick	Television movie
1975	Hustling	'Two to a Cell' Cop (uncredited)	Television movie
1976	Laverne & Shirley	'Silky' Mulcheck	Episode: "The Bachelor Party"
1976	Harry O	Reporter	Episode: "Hostage"
1976	City of Angels	Seyers	Episode: "The Parting Shot"
1976	Car Wash	Kenny	As Timmothy Tomerson
1977	Benny And Barney: Las Vegas Undercover	Barney Tuscom	Television movie
1977	All That Glitters	'Sonny' Packer	TV series
1977	Terraces	Steve	Television movie
1977	Which Way Is Up?	Tour Guide	As Timothy Thomerson
1977-1978	Quark	Gene/Jean	TV series regular (8 episodes)
1978	Remember My Name	Jeff	As Timothy Thomerson
1978	Record City	Marty	
1978	A Wedding	Russell Bean	
1978	Hawaii Five-O	Mike Chandler	Episode: "Death Mask"
1979	Mork & Mindy (ep. 13)	Sergie	Guest in TV series
1979	The Associates	Johnny Danko	TV series regular
1979	Angie	Gianni	TV series regular
1980	Getting There	Lester	Television movie
1980	Carny	'Doubles'	
1980	Fade to Black	Jerry Moriarty	
1981	Take This Job and Shove It	Ray Binkowski	
1981	In Trouble	Mr. Damrush	Television movie
1981	Golden Gate	Frank Nightingale	Television movie
1981	St. Helens	Sheriff Dwayne Temple	
1981-1982	The Two of Us	Reggie Cavanaugh	TV series regular
1982	Some Kind of Hero	Cal	
1982	Bare Essence	Billy	Television movie
1982	Jekyll and Hyde... Together Again	Dr. Knute Lanyon	
1982	Honkytonk Man	Highway Patrolman	
1983	Likely Stories, Vol. 2		TV series
1983	Metalstorm: The Destruction of Jared-Syn	Rhodes	
1983	The Osterman Weekend	Motorcycle cop	
1983	Uncommon Valor	'Charts'	
1983	Gun Shy	Theodore Ogilvie	TV series
1984	Match Game-Hollywood Squares Hour	Himself	Panelist (March 1984)
1984	Rhinestone	Barnett Kale	
1984	His Mistress	Tom Goodman	Television movie
1984-1988	Hunter	Mule Mulelowski / Police Sergeant Harry Traynor / Police Detective Gil Glasgow	Episodes "Honorable Profession" (1988) ... Mule Mulelowski "Change Partners and Dance"(1986) ... Police Sgt. Harry Traynor "Pen Pals" (1984) ... Police Det. Gil Glasgow
1985	Trancers	Jack Deth	
1985	Volunteers	John Reynolds	
1985	Murder, She Wrote	Lieutenant Clyde Pitts	
1986	Iron Eagle	Colonel Ted Masters	
1986	Ratboy	Alan Reynolds	Uncredited
1986	Zone Troopers	Sergeant	
1986	The Twilight Zone	Billy Diamond	TV Series (Take My Life... Please!)
1986	The B.R.A.T. Patrol	Major Dan Hackett	Television movie
1987	Glory Years	Jack Sanders	Television movie
1987	Near Dark	Loy Colton	
1987	Tour of Duty	Sergeant Aubrey Decker	1 episode. The Good, the Bad, and the Dead
1987	Down and Out in Beverly Hills	Jerry Baskin	TV series
1987	A Tiger's Tale	Lonny	
1988	Cherry 2000	Lester	
1988	The Wrong Guys	Tim	
1988	The Incredible Hulk Returns	Jack LeBeau	Television movie
1989	Who's Harry Crumb?	Vince Barnes	
1990	Vietnam, Texas	Max Heron	
1990	Air America	Babo	
1990	The Flash	Jay Allen	Television movie
1990	Murder, She Wrote	Bert Rogers	TV series
1990	Midnight Caller	Perry Fine	TV series
1991	Trancers II	Jack Deth	
1991	Dollman	Brick Bardo	
1991	Baywatch	Jim 'Buzz' Buchannon	TV series
1991	Golden Girls	Stevie	TV series
1992	Eddie Presley	Shock Comic	
1992	Stringer	Jack Mitchett	
1992	Intimate Stranger	Malcolm Henthoff	Television movie
1992	Bad Channels	Brick Bardo	
1992	Trancers III	Jack Deth	
1993	Die Watching	Detective Lewis	
1993	Nemesis	Farnsworth	
1993	Dollman vs. Demonic Toys	Brick Bardo	
1993	The Harvest	Steve Mobley	
1993	Knights	Farmer	Uncredited
1993	Brainsmasher... A Love Story	Detective Black	
1994	Fleshtone	Buddy Fields	
1994	Natural Causes	The Westerner	
1994	Trancers 4: Jack of Swords	Jack Deth	
1994	The Cisco Kid	Lundquist	Television movie
1994	Hong Kong 97	Jack McGraw	
1994	Trancers 5: Sudden Deth	Jack Deth	
1995	Malevolence	Mr. Williams	
1995	Dominion	Fitz	
1995	Spitfire	Rex Beechum	
1995	Sirens	Sergeant James 'Buddy' Zunder	TV series
1995	Heatseeker	Oldest Elder	
1995	Walker Texas Ranger	Mitch Bolton	TV series
1996	Back to Back	Thomas	
1996	Nemesis 3: Prey Harder	Farnsworth 2	
1996	Pacific Blue	The Angel	TV series
1996	Land's End	Dave 'Thunder' Thornton	TV series
1996	Kid Cop	Arnold Downey	
1997	Blast	Police Commissioner	
1997	Xena: Warrior Princess	Meleager The Mighty	TV series
1997	When Time Expires	Rifkin Koss	Television movie
1997	The Angry Beavers	Leonard Beaver (voice)	TV series
1997	Lois & Clark: The New Adventures of Superman	Woody Sams	TV series
1998	Crossfire	Crane	
1998	Together & Alone	Daddy	
1998	Escape from Atlantis	Liam Gallagher	Television movie
1998	Fear and Loathing in Las Vegas	Hoodlum	Cameo
1998	Border to Border	'Poet'	
1999	Red Team	William Heywood	
1999	Dirt Merchant	Jack	
1999	Suckers	Detective Laughlin	
1999	Unseen Evil	Ranger Chuck Macneil	
1999	The Magnificent Seven	Guy Royal	TV series
1999	Last Chance	Sam	
1999	Detour	Mel Kiner	
1999	Sabrina, the Teenage Witch	Mr. Alcerro	TV series
2000	Gangland	Dr. Adams	
2000	Submerged	Owen Cantrell	
2000	Highway 395	Unknown	
2000	The Princess & the Barrio Boy	Monsignor O'Dell	Television movie
2001	Devil's Prey	Sheriff Harry	
2001	They Crawl	The Exterminator	
2001	Unseen Evil	Ranger Chuck MacNeil	
2002	Gale Force	Phillip Edwards	
2002	Shoot or Be Shot	Uncle Bill	
2002	The Killing Point	Mr. Banyon	
2002	Ocean Point	Mike	
2002	Project Viper	Sheriff Morgan	Television movie
2002	Con Express	Bill Barnes	
2002	The District	Colonel Carl	TV series
2002	Days of Our Lives	Oliver Wentworth	TV series
2003	Cliché	Chief Jackson	
2003	Air Marshal	Senator Chambers	
2004	Paparazzi	Uniformed Officer	
2004	A Lousy Ten Grand	Judge	
2005	The Nowhere Man	Unknown	
2005	Dual	Deston / Jared	
2005	Swarmed	Phineas Washburn	Television movie
2005	Hell to Pay	Reverend	
2005	Junior Pilot	Captain Noonan	also known as Final Approach
2006	The Strange Case of Dr. Jekyll and Mr. Hyde	Arnie Swift	
2006	To Kill a Mockumentary	Will	
2006	Sasquatch Mountain	Eli	
2006	Forget About It	Al 'Arizona Al'	
2006	A.I. Assault	Admiral Harrison	Television movie
2006	Bottoms Up	A.J. Mancini	
2006	Left in Darkness	Joe	
2006	Evil Bong	Jack Deth	
2006	Christmas Do-Over	Arthur	Television movie
2007	God's Ears	Uncle Steve	
2007	Urban Decay	Detective Thompson	
2007	Blue Lake Massacre	Marshall Lex	
2007	Good God Bad Dog	Bill Monahan	
2007	Live Evil	The Priest	
2008	Wicked Lake	Jake	
2009	War Wolves	Frank Bergman	
2011	Shameless	A.B. Fisher	TV series
2012	Season of Darkness	Detective Kesler	
2012	MoniKa	Thomas	
2013	The Silicon Assassin Project	Freddy Jones	TV series
2016	Catfish Blues	Eddie	
2017	Asylum of Darkness	Detective Kesler	
2020	The Comedy Store	Himself	TV series

=== Video games ===
Year	Video game	Role
2011	Homefront	Voice of Freedom
2011	Saints Row: The Third	Cyrus Temple
2013	Saints Row IV	Simulation Cyrus Temple
