= Humphrey's Restaurant & Tavern =

Former bar and tavern

Coordinates: 38°38′06″N 90°14′15″W

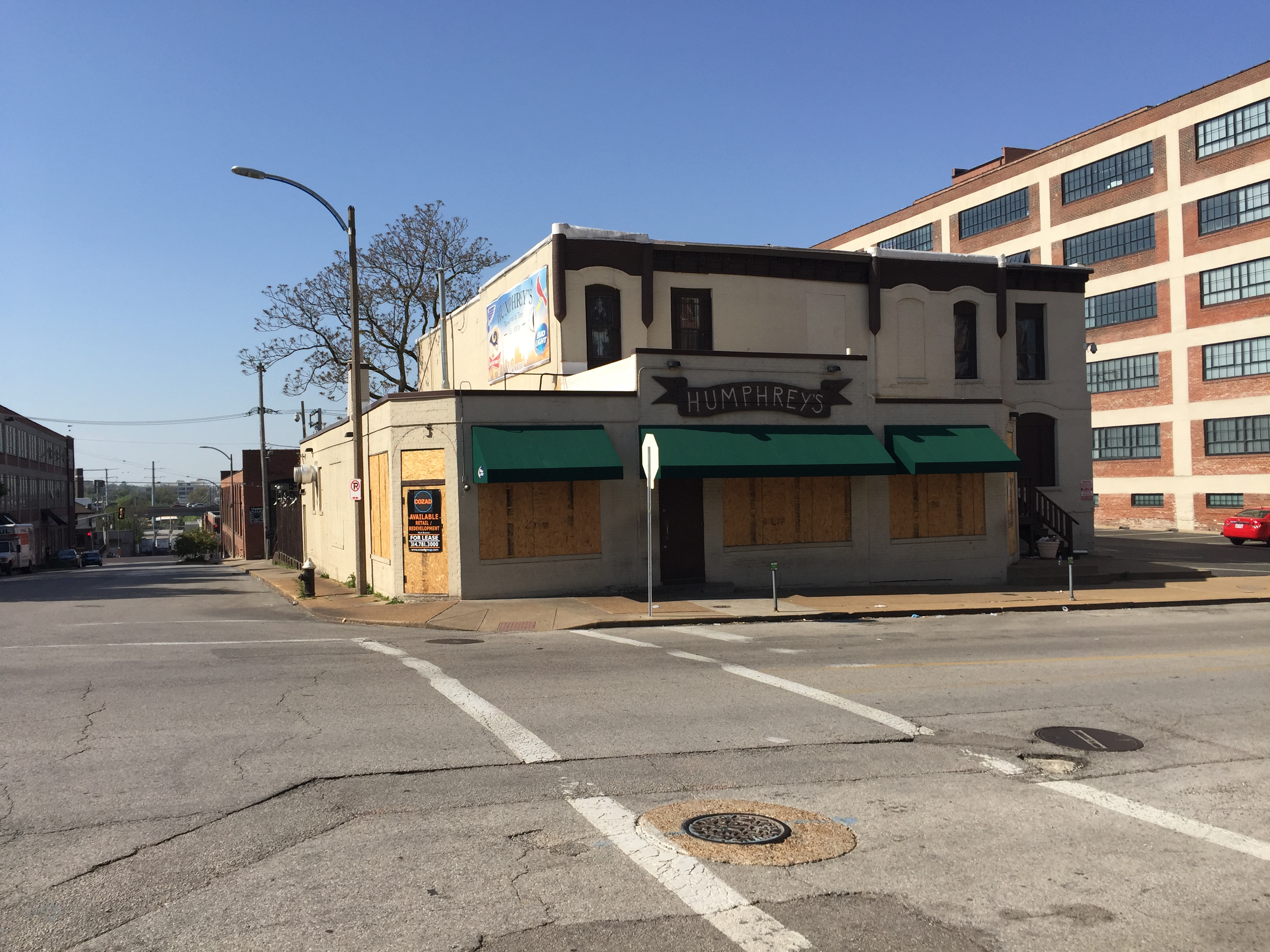
Humphrey's Restaurant & Tavern in 2017, after it closed.

Humphrey's Restaurant & Tavern (also referred to as Humphrey's or Hump's) is a college bar near Saint Louis University. For over four decades, the restaurant and tavern at the corner of Spring and Laclede has been the close-to-campus destination for many students. It was the basis for the 2001 film One Night at McCool's, written by Stan Seidel, and yet the movie was not shot here. Seidel, who died just prior to the film's debut, was a frequent customer at Humphrey's before writing the film.

The tavern opened on June 18, 1976, and is named after its owner, Robert "Humphrey" Mangelsdorf.

Mr. Mangelsdorf was born in St. Louis. In 1968, he earned a bachelor's degree in business administration from St. Louis University, where he was a member of Phi Kappa Theta fraternity.

The tavern closed on January 1, 2017. Originally the structure was going to be demolished and rebuilt, but it instead was heavily renovated. Humphrey's reopened in November 2022.
