= Red Team =

A red team is a group that attempts a physical or digital intrusion against an organization.

Red Team may also refer to:

- Federal Aviation Administration Red team. Set up by the United States Congress to help the FAA think like terrorists, the elite squad tested airport security systems.
- Red Team (film), a 1999 Canadian film also known as The Crimson Code
- Red Team, one of two opposing teams in the machinima Red vs. Blue
