= List of awards and nominations received by Ally McBeal =

List of awards and nominations for Ally McBeal
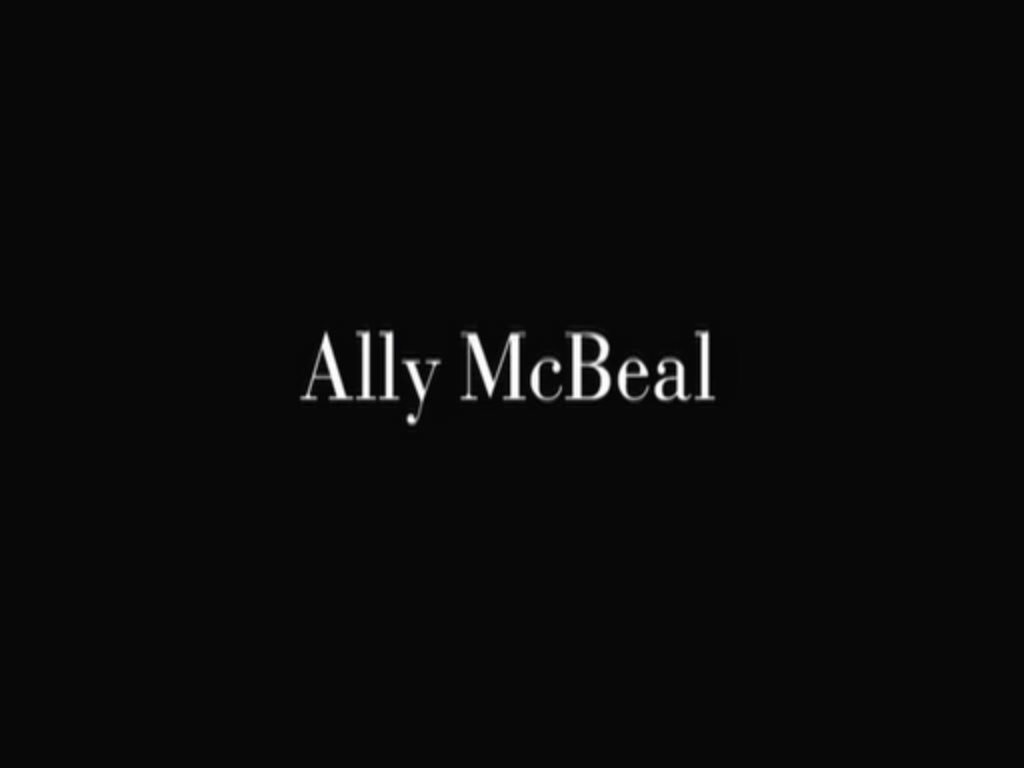
Awards and nominations
| Award | Wins | Nominations |
| ACE Eddie Awards | 1 | 1 |
| Aftonbladets TV-pris | 3 | 3 |
| American Choreography Awards | 1 | 1 |
| American Comedy Awards | 2 | 5 |
| American Society of Cinematographers Awards | 0 | 4 |
| Artios Awards | 1 | 2 |
| ASCAP Film and Television Music Awards | 2 | 2 |
| BMI Film and TV Awards | 1 | 1 |
| British Academy Television Awards | 0 | 1 |
| Cinema Audio Society Awards | 0 | 1 |
| Costume Designers Guild Awards | 0 | 2 |
| Directors Guild of America Awards | 0 | 2 |
| Golden Globe Awards | 4 | 12 |
| Golden Reel Awards | 0 | 5 |
| NAACP Image Awards | 0 | 10 |
| Peabody Awards | 1 | 1 |
| People's Choice Awards | 1 | 2 |
| Primetime Emmy Awards | 7 | 34 |
| Producers Guild of America Awards | 0 | 1 |
| Q Awards | 3 | 11 |
| Satellite Awards | 0 | 4 |
| Screen Actors Guild Awards | 2 | 13 |
| TCA Awards | 1 | 7 |
| TP de Oro | 1 | 1 |
| TV Guide Awards | 0 | 6 |
| Women's Image Awards | 2 | 2 |

Totals (Note: Certain award groups do not simply award one winner. They acknowledge several different recipients, have runners-up, and have third place. Since this is a specific recognition and is different from losing an award, runner-up mentions are considered wins in this award tally. For simplification and to avoid errors, each award in this list has been presumed to have had a prior nomination.)
- Wins: 33
- Nominations: 134

This is the list of awards and nominations received by the American legal comedy drama television series Ally McBeal.

== Awards and nominations ==
Awards and nominations received by Ally McBeal
| Award | Year (Note: The listed year refers to the date of the ceremony, not necessarily the year in which the corresponding season or episode aired.) | Category | Nominee(s) | Result | Ref. |
|---|---|---|---|---|---|
| ACE Eddie Awards | 2000 | Best Edited One-Hour Series for Television | Philip Carr Neel (for "Car Wash") | Won | |
| Aftonbladets TV-pris | 1998 | Best Foreign TV Program | Ally McBeal | Won | |
| Aftonbladets TV-pris | 1998 | Best Foreign TV Personality – Female | Calista Flockhart | Won | |
| Aftonbladets TV-pris | 1999 | Best Foreign TV Personality – Female | Calista Flockhart | Won | |
| American Choreography Awards | 2000 | Outstanding Achievement in Television – Episodic | Joseph Malone (for "I Will Survive") | Won (Note: Tied with Jerry Mitchell from The Drew Carey Show (for "Drew and Kate Boink")) | |
| American Comedy Awards | 1999 | Funniest Female Performer in a TV Series (Leading Role) – Network, Cable or Syndication | Calista Flockhart | Nominated | |
| American Comedy Awards | 1999 | Funniest Female Guest Appearance in a TV Series | Tracey Ullman | Won | |
| American Comedy Awards | 2000 | Funniest Supporting Female Performer in a TV Series | Lucy Liu | Nominated | |
| American Comedy Awards | 2000 | Funniest Female Guest Appearance in a TV Series | Tracey Ullman | Nominated | |
| American Comedy Awards | 2000 | Funniest Female Guest Appearance in a TV Series | Betty White | Won | |
| American Society of Cinematographers Awards | 1998 | Outstanding Achievement in Cinematography in Regular Series | Billy Dickson (for "Silver Bells") | Nominated | |
| American Society of Cinematographers Awards | 2001 | Outstanding Achievement in Cinematography in Regular Series | Billy Dickson (for "Ally McBeal: The Musical, Almost") | Nominated | |
| American Society of Cinematographers Awards | 2002 | Outstanding Achievement in Cinematography in Regular Series | Billy Dickson (for "The Wedding") | Nominated | |
| American Society of Cinematographers Awards | 2003 | Outstanding Achievement in Cinematography in Regular Series | Billy Dickson (for "What I'll Never Do for Love Again") | Nominated | |
| Artios Awards | 2000 | Best Casting for TV, Comedy Episodic | Nikki Valko, Ken Miller | Nominated | |
| Artios Awards | 2001 | Best Casting for TV, Comedy Episodic | Nikki Valko, Ken Miller | Won | |
| ASCAP Film and Television Music Awards | 1999 | Top TV Series | Vonda Shepard | Won | |
| ASCAP Film and Television Music Awards | 2000 | Top TV Series | Vonda Shepard | Won | |
| BMI Film and TV Awards | 1999 | BMI TV Music Award | Danny Lux | Won | |
| British Academy Television Awards | 1999 | Best International (Programme or Series) | Ally McBeal (Note: Nominee: David E. Kelley) | Nominated | |
| Cinema Audio Society Awards | 1999 | Outstanding Achievement in Sound Mixing for Television – Series | Paul Lewis, Nello Torri, Peter Kelsey (for "Making Spirits Bright") | Nominated | |
| Costume Designers Guild Awards | 2000 | Outstanding Contemporary Television Series | Rachael M. Stanley | Nominated | |
| Costume Designers Guild Awards | 2001 | Outstanding Contemporary Television Series | Kathleen Detoro, Yana Syrkin | Nominated | |
| Directors Guild of America Awards | 1998 | Outstanding Directorial Achievement in Dramatic Series – Night | James Frawley (for "Pilot") | Nominated | |
| Directors Guild of America Awards | 2001 | Outstanding Directorial Achievement in Comedy Series | Bill D'Elia (for "The Last Virgin") | Nominated | |
| Golden Globe Awards | 1998 | Best Television Series – Musical or Comedy | Ally McBeal | Won | |
| Golden Globe Awards | 1998 | Best Performance by an Actress in a Television Series – Musical or Comedy | Calista Flockhart | Won | |
| Golden Globe Awards | 1999 | Best Television Series – Musical or Comedy | Ally McBeal | Won | |
| Golden Globe Awards | 1999 | Best Performance by an Actress in a Television Series – Musical or Comedy | Calista Flockhart | Nominated | |
| Golden Globe Awards | 1999 | Best Performance by an Actress in a Supporting Role in a Series, Miniseries or Motion Picture Made for Television | Jane Krakowski | Nominated | |
| Golden Globe Awards | 2000 | Best Television Series – Musical or Comedy | Ally McBeal | Nominated | |
| Golden Globe Awards | 2000 | Best Performance by an Actress in a Television Series – Musical or Comedy | Calista Flockhart | Nominated | |
| Golden Globe Awards | 2001 | Best Television Series – Musical or Comedy | Ally McBeal | Nominated | |
| Golden Globe Awards | 2001 | Best Performance by an Actress in a Television Series – Musical or Comedy | Calista Flockhart | Nominated | |
| Golden Globe Awards | 2001 | Best Performance by an Actor in a Supporting Role in a Series, Miniseries or Motion Picture Made for Television | Robert Downey Jr. | Won | |
| Golden Globe Awards | 2002 | Best Television Series – Musical or Comedy | Ally McBeal | Nominated | |
| Golden Globe Awards | 2002 | Best Performance by an Actress in a Television Series – Musical or Comedy | Calista Flockhart | Nominated | |
| Golden Reel Awards | 1999 | Best Sound Editing – Television Episodic – Music | Sharyn Gersh | Nominated | |
| Golden Reel Awards | 2000 | Best Sound Editing – Television Episodic – Dialogue & ADR | David Rawlinson, Dennis Gray, Ralph Osborn, David Melhase (for "Car Wash") | Nominated | |
| Golden Reel Awards | 2000 | Best Sound Editing – Television Episodic – Music | Sharyn Gersh (for "Seeing Green") | Nominated | |
| Golden Reel Awards | 2001 | Best Sound Editing – Television Episodic – Music | Sharyn Gersh, Jennifer Barak (for "Ally McBeal: The Musical, Almost") | Nominated | |
| Golden Reel Awards | 2002 | Best Sound Editing in Television – Music, Episodic Live Action | Sharyn Gersh (for "Cloudy Skies, Chance of Parade") | Nominated | |
| NAACP Image Awards | 1999 | Outstanding Drama Series | Ally McBeal | Nominated | |
| NAACP Image Awards | 1999 | Outstanding Supporting Actress in a Drama Series | Lisa Nicole Carson | Nominated | |
| NAACP Image Awards | 2000 | Outstanding Drama Series | Ally McBeal | Nominated | |
| NAACP Image Awards | 2000 | Outstanding Supporting Actress in a Drama Series | Lisa Nicole Carson | Nominated | |
| NAACP Image Awards | 2000 | Outstanding Supporting Actress in a Drama Series | Lucy Liu | Nominated | |
| NAACP Image Awards | 2000 | Outstanding Supporting Actor in a Drama Series | Jesse L. Martin | Nominated | |
| NAACP Image Awards | 2002 | Outstanding Supporting Actress in a Comedy Series | Lisa Nicole Carson | Nominated | |
| NAACP Image Awards | 2002 | Outstanding Supporting Actress in a Comedy Series | Jennifer Holliday | Nominated | |
| NAACP Image Awards | 2002 | Outstanding Supporting Actor in a Comedy Series | Taye Diggs | Nominated | |
| NAACP Image Awards | 2003 | Outstanding Supporting Actress in a Comedy Series | Regina Hall | Nominated | |
| Peabody Awards | 1999 | Honoree (Note: Presented to Fox and David E. Kelley Productions) | | Honored | |
| People's Choice Awards | 2000 | Favorite Female TV Performer | Calista Flockhart | Won | |
| People's Choice Awards | 2001 | Favorite Female TV Performer | Calista Flockhart | Nominated | |
| Primetime Emmy Awards | 1998 | Outstanding Comedy Series | Ally McBeal (Note: Nominees: David E. Kelley, Jeffrey Kramer, Mike Listo, Jonathan Pontell, Steve Robin, Pamela Wisne) | Nominated | |
| Primetime Emmy Awards | 1998 | Outstanding Lead Actress in a Comedy Series | Calista Flockhart (for "One Hundred Tears Away") | Nominated | |
| Primetime Emmy Awards | 1998 | Outstanding Directing for a Comedy Series | James Frawley (for "Pilot") | Nominated | |
| Primetime Emmy Awards | 1998 | Outstanding Directing for a Comedy Series | Allan Arkush (for "Cro-Magnon") | Nominated | |
| Primetime Emmy Awards | 1998 | Outstanding Writing for a Comedy Series | David E. Kelley (for "Theme of Life") | Nominated | |
| Primetime Emmy Awards | 1999 | Outstanding Comedy Series | Ally McBeal (Note: Nominees: Peter Burrell, David E. Kelley, Jeffrey Kramer, Mike Listo, Jonathan Pontell, Steve Robin, Pamela Wisne) | Won | |
| Primetime Emmy Awards | 1999 | Outstanding Lead Actress in a Comedy Series | Calista Flockhart (for "Sideshow") | Nominated | |
| Primetime Emmy Awards | 1999 | Outstanding Supporting Actor in a Comedy Series | Peter MacNicol | Nominated | |
| Primetime Emmy Awards | 1999 | Outstanding Supporting Actress in a Comedy Series | Lucy Liu (for "Angels and Blimps" and "Sex, Lies, and Politics") | Nominated | |
| Primetime Emmy Awards | 1999 | Outstanding Directing for a Comedy Series | Arlene Sanford (for "Those Lips, that Hand") | Nominated | |
| Primetime Emmy Awards | 1999 | Outstanding Writing for a Comedy Series | David E. Kelley (for "Sideshow") | Nominated | |
| Primetime Emmy Awards | 2000 | Outstanding Supporting Actor in a Comedy Series | Peter MacNicol | Nominated | |
| Primetime Emmy Awards | 2000 | Outstanding Directing for a Comedy Series | Bill D'Elia (for "Ally McBeal: The Musical, Almost") | Nominated | |
| Primetime Emmy Awards | 2001 | Outstanding Lead Actress in a Comedy Series | Calista Flockhart (for "Falling Up") | Nominated | |
| Primetime Emmy Awards | 2001 | Outstanding Supporting Actor in a Comedy Series | Peter MacNicol (for "Reason to Believe" and "In Search of Barry White") | Won | |
| Primetime Emmy Awards | 2001 | Outstanding Supporting Actor in a Comedy Series | Robert Downey Jr. (for "Sex, Lies and Second Thoughts" and "The Obstacle Course") | Nominated | |
| Primetime Creative Arts Emmy Awards | 1998 | Outstanding Art Direction for a Series | Peter Politanoff, Diane O'Connell (for "Boy to the World") | Nominated | |
| Primetime Creative Arts Emmy Awards | 1998 | Outstanding Casting for a Series | Jeanie Bacharach, Sharon Jetton | Nominated | |
| Primetime Creative Arts Emmy Awards | 1998 | Outstanding Costume Design for a Series | Loree Parral, Shelly Levine, Michelle Roth (for "Cro-Magnon") | Nominated | |
| Primetime Creative Arts Emmy Awards | 1998 | Outstanding Single-Camera Picture Editing for a Series | Thomas R. Moore (for "Cro-Magnon") | Nominated | |
| Primetime Creative Arts Emmy Awards | 1998 | Outstanding Sound Mixing for a Comedy Series or a Special | Kurt Kassulke, Peter R. Kelsey, Paul M. Lewis, Nello Torri (for "Boy to the World") | Won | |
| Primetime Creative Arts Emmy Awards | 1999 | Outstanding Guest Actor in a Comedy Series | John Ritter | Nominated | |
| Primetime Creative Arts Emmy Awards | 1999 | Outstanding Guest Actress in a Comedy Series | Tracey Ullman | Won | |
| Primetime Creative Arts Emmy Awards | 1999 | Outstanding Art Direction for a Series | Peter Politanoff, Diane O'Connell (for "Making Spirits Bright") | Nominated | |
| Primetime Creative Arts Emmy Awards | 1999 | Outstanding Casting for a Series | Jeanie Bacharach, Sharon Jetton | Nominated | |
| Primetime Creative Arts Emmy Awards | 1999 | Outstanding Costume Design for a Series | Rachael M. Stanley (for "Making Spirits Bright") | Nominated | |
| Primetime Creative Arts Emmy Awards | 1999 | Outstanding Single-Camera Picture Editing for a Series | Philip Carr Neel (for "Angels and Blimps") | Nominated | |
| Primetime Creative Arts Emmy Awards | 1999 | Outstanding Sound Mixing for a Comedy Series or a Special | Peter R. Kelsey, Paul M. Lewis, Nello Torri (for "Love's Illusions") | Won | |
| Primetime Creative Arts Emmy Awards | 2000 | Outstanding Sound Mixing for a Comedy Series or a Special | Peter R. Kelsey, Paul M. Lewis, Nello Torri (for "Car Wash") | Won | |
| Primetime Creative Arts Emmy Awards | 2001 | Outstanding Guest Actress in a Comedy Series | Jami Gertz | Nominated | |
| Primetime Creative Arts Emmy Awards | 2001 | Outstanding Guest Actress in a Comedy Series | Bernadette Peters | Nominated | |
| Primetime Creative Arts Emmy Awards | 2001 | Outstanding Casting for a Comedy Series | Nikki Valko, Ken Miller | Won | |
| Primetime Creative Arts Emmy Awards | 2001 | Outstanding Cinematography for a Single-Camera Series | Billy Dickson (for "Cloudy Skies, Chance of Parade") | Nominated | |
| Primetime Creative Arts Emmy Awards | 2002 | Outstanding Cinematography for a Single-Camera Series | Billy Dickson (for "What I'll Never Do for Love Again") | Nominated | |
| Producers Guild of America Awards | 2001 | Outstanding Producer of Episodic Television, Comedy | | Nominated | |
| Q Awards | 1998 | Best Quality Comedy Series | Ally McBeal | Won | |
| Q Awards | 1998 | Best Actress in a Quality Comedy Series | Calista Flockhart | Won | |
| Q Awards | 1998 | Best Supporting Actor in a Quality Comedy Series | Peter MacNicol | Nominated | |
| Q Awards | 1998 | Best Supporting Actress in a Quality Comedy Series | Lisa Nicole Carson | Nominated | |
| Q Awards | 1998 | Best Recurring Player | Dyan Cannon | Nominated | |
| Q Awards | 1999 | Best Quality Comedy Series | Ally McBeal | Nominated | |
| Q Awards | 1999 | Best Actress in a Quality Comedy Series | Calista Flockhart | Nominated | |
| Q Awards | 1999 | Best Supporting Actor in a Quality Comedy Series | Peter MacNicol | Won | |
| Q Awards | 1999 | Best Supporting Actress in a Quality Comedy Series | Lucy Liu | Nominated | |
| Q Awards | 2000 | Best Actress in a Quality Comedy Series | Calista Flockhart | Nominated | |
| Q Awards | 2000 | Best Supporting Actor in a Quality Comedy Series | Peter MacNicol | Nominated | |
| Satellite Awards | 1999 | Best Actress in a Series, Musical or Comedy | Calista Flockhart | Nominated | |
| Satellite Awards | 2000 | Best Actress in a Series, Musical or Comedy | Calista Flockhart | Nominated | |
| Satellite Awards | 2001 | Best Actress in a Series, Musical or Comedy | Jane Krakowski | Nominated | |
| Satellite Awards | 2003 | Best Actor in a Supporting Role in a Series, Musical or Comedy | Peter MacNicol | Nominated | |
| Screen Actors Guild Awards | 1998 | Outstanding Performance by a Female Actor in a Comedy Series | Calista Flockhart | Nominated | |
| Screen Actors Guild Awards | 1998 | Outstanding Performance by an Ensemble in a Comedy Series | Gil Bellows, Lisa Nicole Carson, Calista Flockhart, Greg Germann, Jane Krakowski, Courtney Thorne-Smith | Nominated | |
| Screen Actors Guild Awards | 1999 | Outstanding Performance by a Female Actor in a Comedy Series | Calista Flockhart | Nominated | |
| Screen Actors Guild Awards | 1999 | Outstanding Performance by a Male Actor in a Comedy Series | Peter MacNicol | Nominated | |
| Screen Actors Guild Awards | 1999 | Outstanding Performance by an Ensemble in a Comedy Series | Gil Bellows, Lisa Nicole Carson, Portia de Rossi, Calista Flockhart, Greg Germann, Jane Krakowski, Lucy Liu, Peter MacNicol, Vonda Shepard, Courtney Thorne-Smith | Won | |
| Screen Actors Guild Awards | 2000 | Outstanding Performance by a Female Actor in a Comedy Series | Calista Flockhart | Nominated | |
| Screen Actors Guild Awards | 2000 | Outstanding Performance by a Female Actor in a Comedy Series | Lucy Liu | Nominated | |
| Screen Actors Guild Awards | 2000 | Outstanding Performance by a Male Actor in a Comedy Series | Peter MacNicol | Nominated | |
| Screen Actors Guild Awards | 2000 | Outstanding Performance by an Ensemble in a Comedy Series | Gil Bellows, Lisa Nicole Carson, Portia de Rossi, Calista Flockhart, Greg Germann, Jane Krakowski, Lucy Liu, Peter MacNicol, Vonda Shepard, Courtney Thorne-Smith | Nominated | |
| Screen Actors Guild Awards | 2001 | Outstanding Performance by a Female Actor in a Comedy Series | Calista Flockhart | Nominated | |
| Screen Actors Guild Awards | 2001 | Outstanding Performance by a Male Actor in a Comedy Series | Peter MacNicol | Nominated | |
| Screen Actors Guild Awards | 2001 | Outstanding Performance by a Male Actor in a Comedy Series | Robert Downey Jr. | Won | |
| Screen Actors Guild Awards | 2001 | Outstanding Performance by an Ensemble in a Comedy Series | Lisa Nicole Carson, Portia de Rossi, Robert Downey Jr., Calista Flockhart, Greg Germann, Jane Krakowski, James LeGros, Lucy Liu, Peter MacNicol, Vonda Shepard | Nominated | |
| TCA Awards | 1998 | Program of the Year | Ally McBeal | Nominated | |
| TCA Awards | 1998 | Outstanding New Program | Ally McBeal | Won | |
| TCA Awards | 1998 | Outstanding Achievement in Comedy | Ally McBeal | Nominated | |
| TCA Awards | 1998 | Individual Achievement in Comedy | Calista Flockhart | Nominated | |
| TCA Awards | 1999 | Outstanding Achievement in Comedy | Ally McBeal | Nominated | |
| TCA Awards | 1999 | Individual Achievement in Comedy | Calista Flockhart | Nominated | |
| TCA Awards | 2001 | Individual Achievement in Comedy | Robert Downey Jr. | Nominated | |
| TP de Oro | 2000 | Best Foreign Series | Ally McBeal | Won | |
| TV Guide Awards | 1999 | Favorite Comedy Series | Ally McBeal | Nominated | |
| TV Guide Awards | 1999 | Favorite Actress in a Comedy Series | Calista Flockhart | Nominated | |
| TV Guide Awards | 2000 | Favorite Comedy Series | Ally McBeal | Nominated | |
| TV Guide Awards | 2000 | Favorite Actress in a Comedy Series | Calista Flockhart | Nominated | |
| TV Guide Awards | 2001 | Comedy Series of the Year | Ally McBeal | Nominated | |
| TV Guide Awards | 2001 | Supporting Actor of the Year in a Comedy Series | Robert Downey Jr. | Nominated | |
| Women's Image Awards | 2001 | Comedy Series | Ally McBeal (Note: Ally McBeal won the Women's Image Award for the episode "The Last Virgin.") | Won | |
| Women's Image Awards | 2001 | Comedy Series Writer | David E. Kelley (for "Reason to Believe") | Won | |
