= A Pyromaniac's Love Story =

- DVD Artwork
- Directed by: Joshua Brand
- Written by: Morgan Ward
- Produced by: Mark Gordon; Barbara Kelly; Allison Lyon Segan
- Starring: William Baldwin; John Leguizamo; Sadie Frost; Erika Eleniak; Michael Lerner; Joan Plowright; Armin Mueller-Stahl
- Cinematography: John Schwartzman
- Edited by: David Rosenbloom
- Music by: Rachel Portman
- Production company: Hollywood Pictures
- Distributed by: Buena Vista Pictures Distribution
- Release date: April 28, 1995
- Running time: 94 minutes
- Country: United States
- Language: English
- Box office: $468,240

A Pyromaniac's Love Story is a 1995 American romantic comedy film directed by Joshua Brand and starring William Baldwin, John Leguizamo, Sadie Frost, and Erika Eleniak. The original screenplay is by Morgan Ward. It was filmed in Toronto, Ontario.

== Plot summary ==
Sergio is a pastry shop assistant who is smitten with Hattie, a mousy girl who works in her father Perry's diner and refuses to consider a relationship with him until he begins to earn a decent living. An opportunity presents itself when Linzer, Sergio's employer, offers him $20,000 to torch the store so he can collect the insurance money and use it to give his wife the lifestyle he feels she deserves. Sergio declines the offer, but one night the bakery is burnt to the ground anyway.

Sergio is offered $25,000 to take the blame by the millionaire father of the real culprit, the mentally unstable Garet, who set the bakery on fire as a public declaration of his love for his society girlfriend Stephanie, whose attraction to Sergio, unbeknownst to her vengeance-seeking beau, is unrequited. Despite his innocence, Sergio claims responsibility for the fire so he can use the money to claim Hattie as his own. Linzer, however, has second thoughts about allowing Sergio to pay for the crime, so he confesses he did it, while his wife insists she set the blaze, in order to prevent her husband from being imprisoned. Sgt. Zikowski is left to determine who of the four claiming guilt is the real perpetrator.

== Cast ==
- William Baldwin as Garet
- John Leguizamo as Sergio
- Sadie Frost as Hattie
- Erika Eleniak as Stephanie
- Michael Lerner as Perry
- Joan Plowright as Mrs. Linzer
- Armin Mueller-Stahl as Mr. Linzer
- Mike Starr as Sgt. Zikowski

== Principal production credits ==
- Producer ..... Mark Gordon
- Original Music ..... Rachel Portman
- Cinematography ..... John Schwartzman
- Production Design ..... Dan Davis
- Art Direction ..... Peter Grundy
- Set Decoration ..... Jaro Dick
- Costume Design ..... Bridget Kelly

== Reception ==
In his review in The New York Times, Stephen Holden called the film "as cuddlesome as a tombstone in January" and added, "[It] wants to be a zany urban romance on the order of Moonstruck, with a bit of A Midsummer Night's Dream thrown in. But its nearly jokeless screenplay by Morgan Ward is so convoluted with plot twists that the characters barely have time to breathe before the story forces them to adopt a new set of caricatured attitudes."

Roger Ebert of the Chicago Sun-Times said the film "starts out like a lighthearted charmer, and then it goes on and on and on—circling the same plot idea so doggedly that I began to wonder idly what it might have been like as a short subject. It doesn't have a mean bone in its body or, for that matter, a brain in its head . . . The characters behave like simpletons, breaking up and getting back together again at the convenience of the plot. Director Joshua Brand . . . has the nerve to go for the sort of cheerful whimsy of Moonstruck, Sleepless in Seattle and While You Were Sleeping. But whimsy without wit is like an empty smile."

In the San Francisco Chronicle, Mick LaSalle said it "has a fine cast and a director, Joshua Brand, who has a feeling for the tone of the piece. The film's cinematography is crisp and slightly fantastic, and its sound track is sardonic but warm. But the script—ooh, that script. After a charming first few minutes, A Pyromaniac's Love Story becomes relentlessly fey, unbearably picaresque and sadistically lyric. Morgan Ward's screenplay is like an inept attempt at a Giraudoux play or a John Patrick Shanley script. But without the passion behind it—or the flair for heightened language—the thing is a 100-minute nose-dive."

Joe Leydon of Variety called the film "a quirky little gem" and "a modern-day fairy tale with a bemused appreciation of romantic love, blazing passions and other human follies."

In The San Francisco Examiner, Gary Kamiya observed, "It would take more than a can of lighter fluid to ignite this soggy film. A Pyromaniac's Love Story aspires to being an offbeat comedy, somewhere between a fairy tale and a whimsical love story. What it is an irritatingly smarmy, implausible mess. A kind of slow-motion farce that ill-advisedly attempts to mingle wildly disparate realities and acting styles, [it] might have worked had its various plot strands been ingeniously interwoven. But no P.G. Wodehouse or Georges Feydeau is anywhere in sight . . . This film slips between arch cutesiness and semi-seriousness with no discernible pattern or purpose."
