= Final Impact (film) =

- Directed by: Joseph Merhi; Stephen Smoke
- Written by: Stephen Smoke
- Produced by: Joseph Merhi; Richard Pepin
- Starring: Mimi Lesseos; Lorenzo Lamas; Kathleen Kinmont; Michael Worth
- Cinematography: Richard Pepin
- Edited by: Geraint Bell; John Weidner
- Music by: John Gonzalez
- Production company: Hollywood Road Films
- Distributed by: PM Home Video - Domestic Video Distributor
- Release date: 1992
- Country: United States
- Language: English

Final Impact is a 1992 direct-to-video martial arts film starring Jeff Langton, Mimi Lesseos, Lorenzo Lamas and Michael Worth. It was directed by Joseph Merhi and Stephen Smoke. The film was shot in 18 days.

== Plot summary ==
Nick Taylor was once a champion in the sport of kickboxing. However, when the brutal Jake Gerard defeats him, Nick not only loses the title, but he also loses his wife Roxy to Gerard. Nick now spends his time drinking and reminiscing about his heavy loss. However, one day, a young upstart from Ohio has arrived. His name is Danny Davis and he wants Nick to train him. Nick is not sure Danny has what it takes to prove himself, so Nick takes him to a club with a kickboxing ring, hires a fellow kickboxer and tells him to face Danny. Danny is able to defeat Nick's fighter and tells Nick he's invincible.

The next day, Nick tests Danny himself and, when Danny fails, Nick tells him 'nobody is invincible', but he offers to train him. As Danny and Nick begin to train, a bond strengthens between the two. Nick's somewhat unstable relationship with local waitress Maggie also begins to get better. Nick finally finds himself in a comfortable place as he gets Danny ready for an upcoming tournament to determine who will become the next World Champion in Las Vegas. As Danny begins to win matches, Nick becomes proud of himself as a mentor. However, when Jake arrives with Roxy, the two play mind games with Nick. Nick slowly begins to regress again while training Danny. When Nick decides enough is enough, he challenges Jake to a fight on a rooftop. However, Jake decimates Nick to the point where Nick ends up in the hospital fighting for his life. In the hospital, Nick talks to Danny and Maggie, expressing his regret for what he had done and wishes Danny the best in the finals against Jake. Shortly after that, Nick dies in his hospital bed.

At the finals of the World Championships, Jake overpowers Danny at first. However, with Maggie's full support and remembering his training with Nick, Danny finally defeats Jake with a series of kicks, ranging from a side kick to numerous roundhouses, and ending it with a flying wushu-style half-butterfly kick, knocking Jake out. Danny wins the championship and both he and Maggie look at each other and smile as Danny gets the title belt, celebrating his victory.

== Cast ==
- Lorenzo Lamas as Nick Taylor
- Jeff Langton as Jake Gerard
- Mimi Lesseos as Roxy Taylor
- Kathleen Kinmont as Maggie
- Michael Worth as Danny Davis
- Frank Rivera as Stevie (Credited as Frank Reeves)
- Mike Toney as Joe
- Kathrin Lautner as Girl in Bar
- Chuck Hull as Ring Announcer
- James M. Williams as Commentator
- Michelle Grassnick as Oil Wrestler
- Erika Nann as Oil Wrestler
- Antoinette Steen as Referee
- Kevin McCaulley as Referee
- Earle A. Armstrong as Fighter
- Roman Neri as Fighter
- Gary Daniels as Jimmy, Nick's Club Fighter
- Lance Harris as Fighter
- Ian Jacklin as Fighter
- Azhakd Fariborz as Fighter
- Art Camacho as Fighter
- Anthony Gamboa as Fighter
- Darrell Powell as Fighter
- Jon Kinikama as Fighter
- Ken Doyle as Fighter
- Fred Vanden Akker as Fighter
- Miguel Hierro as Fighter
- Joseph L. Salomone as Fighter
