= Mexican Gangster =

- Directed by: Damian Chapa
- Written by: Carlton Holder (Story); Damian Chapa
- Produced by: Damian Chapa; Dyron Pacheco
- Starring: Damian Chapa; John Loretto; Bougart Linares; Monica Ramon; Amor Sanchez
- Cinematography: Pierre Chemaly
- Edited by: Keita Ideno
- Music by: Don Bodin
- Distributed by: Amadeus Pictures
- Release date: November 1, 2008; (USA)
- Running time: 89 min.
- Country: United States
- Language: English

Mexican Gangster is a 2008 action film, starring Damian Chapa and John Loretto. The movie was written by Carlton Holder and Damian Chapa and directed by Damian Chapa.

== Plot ==
A group of Mexican gangsters led by Johnny Sun, try to survive in their turf, after being ratted out by his little brother.

== Cast ==
- Damian Chapa as Johnny Sun
- John Loretto as Brooklyn Bob
- Bougart Linares as George Washington
- Monica Ramon as Corta
- Tom Druilhet as Detective Pappos
- Amor Sanchez as Olga
- Tommy Stender as Little Johnny
- Ricco Chapa as Ricky
- Brienne De Beau as Carolina
- Andrew Trujillo as Detective Roland

== Reception ==
On Rotten Tomatoes, Mexican Gangster has an approval rating of 86% based on reviews from 7 critics.
