= Unseen Evil =

2001 American horror film

- Directed by: Jay Woelfel
- Written by: Scott Spears
- Produced by: Kenneth Kallberg; David S. Sterling; Johnnie J. Young
- Starring: Richard Hatch; Tim Thomerson; Cindi Braun; Frank Ruotolo; Jere Jon; Cindy Pena; Robbie Rist
- Cinematography: Scott Spears
- Edited by: Eric Chase
- Distributed by: Monarch Home Video
- Release date: November 12, 2001
- Running time: 93 minutes
- Country: United States
- Language: English

Unseen Evil is a 2001 American supernatural horror film directed by Jay Woelfel, and starring Richard Hatch and Tim Thomerson.

Released on November 12, 2001, Unseen Evil was followed by a 2004 sequel, Unseen Evil 2.

== Plot ==
A college professor and a clique of hikers embark on a quest for an archaic Indian burial ground in the woods. Upon stumbling across what is most likely the searched for spot, three members of the squad turn against the rest and restrain them in order to ransack the gravesite.

In due course, one of the looters comes upon a crown that unleashes a monster that commences a killing spree which sends the party into a frenzy for their lives.

== Cast ==
- Richard Hatch as Dr. Peter Jensen
- Tim Thomerson as Ranger Chuck MacNeil
- Cindi Braun as Kate
- Frank Ruotolo as Mike
- Jere Jon as Williams
- Cindy Pena as Dana
- Robbie Rist as Bob
- Benjamin Cline as Native Elder #1
- Herve Estrada as Native Elder #2
- Vincent Whipple as Native Brave
- Daryl Berg as Native Girl
- Mark Craig as Ranger #2
