= Mutual Film Company =

American film production company

Mutual Film Company, LLC
- Formerly: Classico Entertainment (1989-1995); Cloud Nine Entertainment (1995-1997)
- Type: Production company
- Industry: Film
- Founded: 1989; 37 years ago
- Founders: Gary Levinsohn
- Headquarters: Los Angeles, California, United States
- Key people: Mark Gordon; Gary Levinsohn; Don Granger
- Products: Film

Mutual Film Company, LLC is an American film production company based in Hollywood, California. The company was initially founded by financer Gary Levinsohn in 1989 as Classico Entertainment, before combining with The Mark Gordon Company in 1995 to form Cloud Nine Entertainment. Mutual is a film financier that was involved in the co-production of feature films. Mutual notably co-produced and financed several feature films for Paramount Pictures and Universal Studios.

== History ==
=== Classico Entertainment ===
In 1989, following the shutdown of De Laurentiis Entertainment Group, Gary Levinsohn launched his own company Classico Entertainment and it served as a sales agent of Dino de Laurentiis Communications.

In 1994, Classico signed a deal with Atlas Entertainment, whereas Classico could finance films for the company.

=== Mutual Film Company ===
In 1995, film producers Mark Gordon and Gary Levinsohn decided to merge their own companies into Cloud Nine Entertainment, a production company that would be involved in the co-production and financing of feature films. The company opened its office at Raleigh Studios on Melrose Avenue near the Paramount Pictures lot in Hollywood, California.

Following Cloud Nine's establishment, the company created an international sales division, and finalized a multi-year equity partnership with four companies — the United Kingdom's BBC, Germany's Tele-München, Japan's Toho-Towa/Marubeni and France's UGC-PH. These four companies financed 60% (15% each) of the films' budgets, in exchange for distribution rights in their respective territories and equity stakes in the films on a worldwide basis.

The company's first film under the new regime was 1997's The Relic.

Eighteen months after forming Cloud Nine, Gordon and Levinsohn renamed the company to Mutual Film Company. The new name was meant to reflect the joint venture and the profits it would share with its international investors.

Mutual notably financed films for Universal Studios and Paramount Pictures. On several occasions, films developed by Mutual, such as Saving Private Ryan (1998) and The Patriot (2000), were financed by major studios.

In 2000, three of Mutual's partners, Tele Munchen Gruppe, BBC, and Toho, negotiated with a banking consortium led by Union Bank of California and secured a $200 million revolving credit line that would allow Mutual to produce and finance films without approval from a major film studio. Lara Croft: Tomb Raider, released in 2001, became the second highest-grossing film produced by Mutual (after Saving Private Ryan), while its sequel, subtitled The Cradle of Life, underperformed. Mutual's investors left the company, citing the poor box office performances of the many films produced.

In September 2000, Gordon left Mutual to relaunch his own company, the Mark Gordon Company. Film producer Don Granger joined the company, working alongside Levinsohn.

== Filmography ==
Mutual Film Company has produced 21 films. Of these, only two of them, Blue Ice and The Ripper were made-for-television productions. Note that in some cases the distributor or distributors are also co-producers. The box office column reflects the worldwide gross for the theatrical release of the films in United States dollars.

Year	Title	Director	Co-production company(s)	Distributor(s)	Box office	Ref.
1992	Blue Ice ^{1}	Russell Mulcahy	Bregman Productions, M&M Productions and Guild Film Distribution	HBO	—	
1993	The Real McCoy ^{2}	Russell Mulcahy	Bregman/Baer Productions, Capella International	Universal Pictures	$6,484,246	
1995	12 Monkeys	Terry Gilliam	Atlas Entertainment	Universal Pictures	$168,839,459	
1995	Angus	Patrick Read Johnson	Atlas Entertainment, Turner Pictures; in association with BBC, and Tele-München	New Line Cinema	$4,821,759	
1997	The Relic	Peter Hyams	Marubeni/Toho-Towa, Tele-München and BBC	Paramount Pictures	$33,956,608	
1997	The Jackal	Michael Caton-Jones	Alphaville Films	Universal Pictures	$159,330,280	
1997	The Ripper ^{1}	Janet Meyers		Universal Television	—	
1998	Hard Rain	Mikael Salomon	Marubeni/Toho-Towa, Tele-München, BBC UGC-PH and Nordisk Film	Paramount Pictures; Universal Pictures	$19,870,567	
1998	Primary Colors	Mike Nichols	Icarus Productions	Universal Pictures	$52,090,187	
1998	Paulie	John Roberts		DreamWorks Pictures	$26,875,268	
1998	Black Dog	Kevin Hooks	Prelude Pictures	Universal Pictures	$12,951,088	
1998	Saving Private Ryan	Steven Spielberg	Amblin Entertainment	DreamWorks Pictures; Paramount Pictures	$481,840,909	
1998	A Simple Plan	Sam Raimi	Savoy Pictures, in association with BBC, Marubeni, Tele-München, Toho-Towa and UGC-PH	Paramount Pictures; Universal Pictures	$16,316,273	
1999	Virus	John Bruno	Valhalla Motion Pictures and Dark Horse Entertainment	Universal Pictures	$30,652,005	
1999	Man on the Moon	Miloš Forman	Jersey Films, Shapiro/West Productions, in association with Tele-München, BBC and Marubeni/Toho-Towa	Universal Pictures	$47,434,430	
2000	Isn't She Great	Andrew Bergman	Tele-München, BBC and Marubeni/Toho-Towa	Universal Pictures	$3,003,296	
2000	Wonder Boys	Curtis Hanson	Tele-München, BBC and Marubeni/Toho-Towa	Paramount Pictures; Universal Pictures	$33,426,588	
2000	The Patriot	Roland Emmerich	Centropolis Entertainment	Columbia Pictures	$215,294,342	
2001	Lara Croft: Tomb Raider	Simon West	Lawrence Gordon Productions, Eidos Interactive, in association with Tele-München, BBC and Marubeni/Toho-Towa	Paramount Pictures	$274,703,340	
2003	Lara Croft: Tomb Raider – The Cradle of Life	Jan de Bont	Lawrence Gordon Productions, Eidos Interactive, in association with Tele-München, BBC and Marubeni/Toho-Towa	Paramount Pictures	$156,505,388	
2003	Timeline	Richard Donner	Cobalt Media Group, The Donners' Company, Artists Production Group	Paramount Pictures	$43,935,763	
2006	Snakes on a Plane	David R. Ellis		New Line Cinema	$62,022,014	
2012	Deadfall	Stefan Ruzowitzky	StudioCanal, 2929 Productions	Magnolia Pictures	$66,351	
2012	Jack Reacher ^{2}	Christopher McQuarrie	Skydance Productions, Cruise/Wagner Productions	Paramount Pictures	$218,340,595	
Box office total:					$2,038,199,808	—'

^{1} Released as a made-for-television film
^{2} Uncredited
