= Allison Lyon Segan =

American film producer (active 1994–2004)

- Born: United States
- Occupations: Film producer, television producer
- Years active: 1994–2004
- Spouse: Lloyd Segan
- Children: 2

Allison Lyon Segan is a former film producer, active from 1994 to 2004. Her feature films have garnered eight Academy Awards out of eleven nominations. Her last work as a producer was Shark Tale (2004), an animated film for DreamWorks that features Will Smith, Renée Zellweger, Robert De Niro, and Martin Scorsese. Her thriller Swimfan, starring Erika Christensen and Jesse Bradford, was released by Twentieth Century Fox in September 2002 and became her fifth #1 movie at the box office on its opening weekend. She also produced One Night at McCool's for USA Films, starring Liv Tyler, Matt Dillon, John Goodman and Michael Douglas.

As President of the Paramount Pictures-based production company Mutual Films Inc., Segan co-produced the Academy Award-winning Saving Private Ryan, directed by Steven Spielberg and starring Tom Hanks, Matt Damon and Vin Diesel; produced DreamWorks Pictures’ comedy-adventure Paulie; executive produced the action-thriller Hard Rain starring Morgan Freeman and Christian Slater; and produced The Ripper for the USA Network.

Previously, she co-produced blockbuster hits such as the action-thriller Broken Arrow, directed by John Woo and starring John Travolta and Christian Slater; Speed, starring Keanu Reeves and Sandra Bullock; and A Pyromaniac's Love Story, a romantic comedy starring Billy Baldwin and John Leguizamo.

== Personal life ==
Segan was born to a Jewish family, the daughter of Judith and Loren Lyon. She is married to television and film producer Lloyd Segan. In 2006, the family started attending the Leo Baeck Temple in Los Angeles, where she joined the Board of Trustees in July 2025, and he served as President of the Board from 2017 to 2020.

== Filmography ==
=== Film ===
Year	Film	Credit
1994	Speed	Co-producer
1995	A Pyromaniac's Love Story	Co-producer
1996	Broken Arrow	Co-producer
1998	Hard Rain	Executive producer
1998	Paulie	Producer
1998	Saving Private Ryan	Co-producer
2001	One Night at McCool's	Producer
2002	Swimfan	Producer
2004	Shark Tale	Producer

=== Television ===
Year	Title	Notes
1997	The Ripper	TV movie, producer
