= U.S. Seals II: The Ultimate Force =

2001 American military action film

- Official DVD cover
- Directed by: Isaac Florentine
- Written by: Boaz Davidson (Story); Michael D. Weiss
- Produced by: Boaz Davidson; Danny Lerner; David Varod
- Starring: Michael Worth; Karen Kim; Damian Chapa; Marshall R. Teague; Kate Connor
- Cinematography: Peter Belcher
- Edited by: Irit Raz
- Music by: Stephen Edwards
- Production companies: City Heat Productions; Martien Holdings A.V.V. Nu Image/Millennium Films
- Distributed by: Artisan Entertainment; Nu Image/Millennium Films
- Release date: June 21, 2001; (US)
- Running time: 95 minutes
- Country: United States
- Language: English

U.S. Seals II: The Ultimate Force is a 2001 American direct-to-video action film directed by Isaac Florentine, written by Boaz Davidson and Michael D. Weiss, and starring Michael Worth. The film is a standalone sequel to U.S. Seals (2000) and is followed by U.S. Seals 3: Frogmen (2002), it is the second installment in the U.S. Seals film series.

== Plot ==
A group of Navy SEALs infiltrate a dock where they are assigned to retrieve an HVT (High-Value Target) and a shipping manifest of stolen cargo. A gunfight ensues as the SEALs get to work on capturing the target by destroying a boat rigged with C-4, as they capture the target, a SEALs member named Ratliff (Damien Chapa) kills him in retaliation for being hit by the target thus failing their mission. Casey Shepard (Michael Worth) calls for an exfiltration to return to base.

Days go by and both Ratliff and Casey discuss the pros and cons of working for the Navy. They spot their sensei's wild child daughter Nikki (Karen Kim) getting drunk with several sailors, as Ratliff volunteers to take her home. As night falls Casey is alerted to the sound of a woman screaming. The woman turns out to be Nikki and with Ratliff covered in scratch marks on his face, dousing the crime scene with gasoline to cover up his crime. Casey and Ratliff fight it out with Casey being knocked down, Ratliff escapes police custody and vanishes. Kimiko (Karen Kim) who is Nikki's disciplined twin sister and Casey both witness his sensei and her father performing the Hara-Kiri in shame for his daughters death.

Months pass as Ratliff becomes a renegade terrorist with his two main members Sophie (Sophia Crawford) and a silent assassin who is followed by the sound of a raven crowing Artie (Andy Cheung).They infiltrate onto an Army Base to capture Dr.Jane Burrows (Kate Connor) who is one of the few scientists in the world who can build a nuclear warhead. Ratliff is successful in kidnapping Dr.Burrows but not before being tagged with a homing chip as part of national security for High Valued Individuals (HVI's).

The Army's General Donner (Marshall Teague) visits Admiral Patterson of the Navy (Burnell Tucker) to request the aide of the SEALs to find and eliminate Ratliff and informs the Admiral of the situation. Donner receives a call from Ratliff through the office of the Navy knowing now his old boss is in the same room, Ratliff demands the ransom of $1 Billion in exchange for Dr.Burrows. While touring the island where Burrows is held, Ratliff shows the Burrows that he is in possession of a highly secretive Soviet Red 7 Ballistic Nuclear Missile with stealth technology (owning 2 of them).

Patterson calls the aide of Casey who has retired and became civilian is informed that Ratliff has returned and means business. Casey reports to base given a briefing on his mission to recover Dr.Burrows and eliminate Ratliff in the process, the only problem is that no guns and no explosives can be used on the island because of a chemical fallout that covers the whole base, a methane based gas that is somewhat breathable, however the smallest spark can ignite the gas and blow the entire island.

At this point Ratliff shows Dr.Burrows his possession of weapons grade Plutonium, and gives the Dr. An ultimatum which is to make a set of warheads or die. Angrily he reminds his team that absolutely no one can fire or carry a gun after a henchmen arms himself with a 9mm handgun.

Casey calls Kimiko who is still saddened about her father's death and rejects Casey's choice to join the team to get revenge on Ratliff. Casey recruits his old teammate Harper (Mitch Gould) who is training new recruits, a lone mercenary named Omar (Hakim Alston) who will do it for a large sum of cash, a former Navy SEAL named Byrd (Plamen Zahov) who was kicked out for beating up his own teammates, and Finley (Daniel Southworth) doing time in prison for an unknown crime. As the team assemble, Kimiko shows up and joins Casey's team.

With only 24 left in the deadline, they infiltrate the island via plane and proceed underwater towards the island base. With a slight detour from underwater patrols, the infiltration becomes successful. Byrd attempts to stealth kill one of the guards but is stabbed to death by an unseen guard nearby. Before killing the second guard, Byrd becomes the first to die in the group. One guard hears the commotion and runs to alert Ratliff that SEALs are on the base. They locate a surveillance image of the Missile Silo with the Red 7 still on standby, Ratliff now aware of the SEALs, opens a comlink to chat with his former team leader. With time running out the SEALs proceed to the main compound where the lab is set.

Accidentally setting off a snap trap, Finley cries out in pain alerting the team, Ratliff show up with several guards and all engage in a melee skirmish. With Kimiko going after Ratliff and Casey following behind. One by one the guards are falling with Harper and Finley left to finish the job. Donner and Omar go separately to find Casey and Kimiko. Harper eventually dies from his wounds while Finley battles with Artie. Taking advantage of Finley's injured leg gets the upper hand and kills Finley, with respect Artie covers Finley's face with his old scarf weapon and takes Finley's chain weapon. Kimiko and Casey locate Ratliff, however Omar appears and holds Sophia hostage in exchange for $15 million from the ransom Ratliff wants. Casey feeling betrayed by Omar vows payback. Omar using an acidic round stolen earlier from the Major's bag traps Casey and Kimiko in a garbage pile seemingly killing them. A few hours go by and Casey regains consciousness with Kimiko, Casey opens up to Kimiko about being in love with her, Kimiko admits to having loved Casey for a long time, having apologized for her behavior to Casey because she never got over the death of her father and sister make amends and escape their entrapment. Donner watching assists them and locate the lab. Earlier Dr.Burrows had finished making the warheads and Ratliff arming the first missile gets ready to launch. Locating Dr.Burrows she informs the team that Ratliff already has the warheads and is arming the missile. At the same time Ratliff calls Patterson and informs him that the deal needs to be rushed ahead of schedule feeling cheated out by having Patterson send in a rescue team. Ratliff launches the first missile heading to the United States. Ratliff warns he has one left and will launch again if his demands are not met. Using the stealth technology the missile disappears from radar. Ratliff detonates the warhead as radiation falls into the stratosphere. Knowing the threat is real Patterson alerts the White House.

Casey, Kimiko and Donner are given orders to evacuate the island with the Doctor and escape in cooperation with meeting Ratliff's demands. They disobey the order and continue to hunt down Ratliff and the rest of his team. Omar encounters them and tosses a knife hitting Donner in the chest. Casey and Omar fight it out with Casey stabbing Omar with his blade. Donner slowly dies and gives Casey his comlink. Casey calls Ratliff taunting him that he is in the control room and disarmed the missile launch system. Ratliff tells Casey that the threat wasn't just about the money, but the fact he was betrayed by his friend. Ratliff using his remote activator overrides the control console and starts the launch countdown.

Dr.Burrows comes up with a plan to destroy the warhead without the nuclear trigger by prematurely blowing up the missile. They use the methane air as a catalyst while Burrows uses an old working fuse box as a bomb,using a hair clip and Casey's lucky watch. Casey and Kimiko do battle with Ratliff,Sophia and Artie. With both Sophia and Artie dead, Ratliff is the only one left, still overpowering Casey, both Kimiko and Casey use Ratliff's sword against him and slice him in half. With a few minutes left, the bomb is set and all three use Ratliff's escape submarine to escape the island, as the missile is ready to launch the fuse box creates a spark big enough to ignite the gas and blow up the island along with the missile.

With the mission accomplished, Casey recollects how "A SEAL never leaves a man behind." Kimiko assures him that he didn't. Casey then remembers all of his fallen teammates and shared a moment with Kimiko.

== Cast ==
- Michael Worth as Lieutenant Casey Sheppard
- Karen Kim as Kamiko / Nikki
- Damian Chapa as Chief Frank Ratliff
- Marshall R. Teague as Major Nathan Donner
- Kate Connor as Dr. Jane Burrows
- Sophia Crawford as Sophie
- Hakim Alston as Omar
- Andy Cheng as Artie
- Mitchell Gould as Harper
- Dan Southworth as Finley
- George Cheung as Sensei Matsumura
- Burnell Tucker as Amiral Travis Patterson

== Reception ==
=== Critical response ===
U.S. Seals 2 was reviewed by several websites and blogs specialized in trash, direct-to-video and B movies. Most of them praised the film, considering it a typical so bad it's good film and a cult classic in the action genre.

Direct to Video Connoisseur praised some aspects of the movie: "This is for B action fans only, because it is bad action to the max, and if you have trouble with how unabashedly and unironically bad action this is, you probably won't enjoy it. Otherwise buckle up and have a good time". The blog Explosive Action gave U.S. Seals 2 a very good review, concluding: "U.S. Seals 2 is a solid mercenary bad-actioner from the turn of the century, with a great director and writer managing a solid cast. No messy Avid-farts and epilepsy-enducing techniques utilised here either. Good stuff indeed, and easily the best penny DVD I've ever bought". Website Good Efficient Butchery praised Florentine direction, arguing that U.S. Seals 2 is so bad that it's good: "U.S. SEALS II isn't Florentine's best film, but it's probably his most well-known (his two UNDISPUTED sequels are awesome). It became a word-of-mouth hit among video store employees and bad movie fans with its constant whoosh sound effects whenever someone moves". Marty McKee from Johnny LaRue's Crane Shot considered the film one of the best action films he ever seen: "U.S. SEALS II: THE ULTIMATE FORCE is nothing less than one of the best direct-to-video action movies ever made. In fact, its energy and spectacular fight sequences are thrilling enough to rank U.S. SEALS II among the best action films of the 21st century so far, period". Monster Hunter praised the Florentine's work on the film and the non-stop action, concluding that U.S. Seals 2 is far better than its predecessor: "The movie doesn't skimp or let you down with its hand to hand action, sending an endless supply of Ratliff's henchman against the Seals! Guys are flipping, spinning around, flying through the air, falling off rubble, getting sliced by swords and whacked by chains!" The Video Vacuum called it "almost epic in its badness" and stated: "U.S. Seals 2 is one of those movies that have generous helpings of So-Bad-It's-Good moments sprinkled in with So-Bad-It's-Awesome scenes that makes you shake your head in disbelief".

== Sequel ==
A sequel titled U.S. Seals 3: Frogmen, was released in 2002.
