= War Wolves =

- Written by: Michael Worth
- Directed by: Michael Worth
- Starring: John Saxon; Tim Thomerson; Michael Worth; Natasha Alam; Adrienne Barbeau
- Theme music composer: Corey Allen Jackson
- Country of origin: United States
- Original language: English

Production
- Producer: Brian Schwartz
- Cinematography: Neil Lisk
- Editor: J.R. Bonner
- Running time: 104 minutes
- Production company: Curb Entertainment

Original release
- Network: Syfy
- Release: March 8, 2009

War Wolves is a 2009 television film that originally aired on the Syfy network on March 8, 2009. The film stars John Saxon and Michael Worth, the latter having also served as the film's director. This film is now available to stream on the streaming service Prime Video.

== Plot ==
War Wolves depicts the lives of several Army soldiers who are ambushed in a small town in the Middle East. They return home and to their normal lives, however, they find that they had changed considerably. Growing fangs at will and slowly going through a mysterious and painful change, they part ways when they realize their own taste for blood. Refusing to give in one finds a life away from it all, going under the name of Lawrence Talbot. But escaping his life he finds is impossible as the members of his "pack" attempt to hunt him down and convert him to the more thrilling life their changes are introducing them to.

== Cast ==
- Michael Worth as Jake Gabriel, who had left his former comrades behind and uses alcohol and drugs to suppress the urges and changes his body is undergoing. He coins the alias Lawrence Talbot, the name of the original Wolfman.
- Natasha Alam as Erika Moore, Jake's love interest and the leader of the wolves in Jake's absence, she attempts to convert the reluctant Jake into embracing his wolf side and turning against the humans.
- John Saxon as Tony Ford, an aging military General in hunt of the wolves. Detached from his family due to his lengthy, seemingly endless work.
- Tim Thomerson as Frank Bergman, Ford's assistant, a rambunctious old man who seems to make light of about any situation. He is Tony's opposite and best friend.
- Adrienne Barbeau as Gail, a woman who has taken Jake in, she attends an AA group at the local church, which Jake attends as well. She is a very insightful woman who regales stories of "her" Kenny and provides profound insight, mixed with a little belief in Men in Black, Sasquatch, Aliens etc.
- Kristi Clainos as Justine
- Siri Baruc as Casey
- Daniel Southworth as Clay
- Art LaFleur as Leo
- Zosia Mamet as Rudy
- Alex Ballar as Andrew Jensen
- Martin Kove as Malick
- Lois Stewart as Donna
- Margot Farley as Christine
- John Edward Lee as Tommy
