= Monica Ramon =

Spanish-American actress

- Born: Barcelona, Spain
- Years active: (1997-present)

Monica Ramon is a Spanish-American actress. She first began appearing in film, television, and stage productions in her native Spain in the mid-1990s.

== Early life ==
Ramon is from Barcelona, Spain. She moved to Los Angeles, California in 2007.

== Career ==
Ramon's first acting role was in the Spanish television series Happy End (1997), playing the role of Malvada. Later that year, she was featured in the Spanish film, Primats. In 2008, Ramon appeared in Polanski Unauthorized, and Mexican Gangster. In 2009, she was in From Mexico With Love.

== Filmography and television ==
Year	Film/TV Show	Role	Other notes	References
1997	Happy End	Co-star	Spanish television series	
1997	Primats	Day Player	Spanish Title - Primates	
2006	Full Moon Rising	Lead		
2007	Secretos (Ep: El Ingeniero)	Lead	(Spanish TV Series)	
2007	Secretos (Ep: Controversia)	Lead	(Spanish TV Series)	
2008	Mexican Gangster	Corta	(Announced)	
2008	Polanski Unauthorized	Co/Star		
2008	XII	Co-star		
2008	Dirty Girl	(Lead)16 international film Festivals		
2009	From Mexico With Love	Featured		
