= El Padrino (film) =

- Film poster
- Directed by: Damian Chapa
- Written by: Troy Barker; Damian Chapa; Carlton Holder; Aaron Pugliese
- Starring: Jennifer Tilly; Faye Dunaway; Kathleen Quinlan; Robert Wagner; Tommy 'Tiny' Lister; Gary Busey; Joanna Pacula; Rachel Hunter; Stacy Keach
- Music by: Gerard K. Marino
- Release date: 2004
- Running time: 128 minutes
- Country: United States
- Language: English

El Padrino is a 2004 American film directed by Damian Chapa. The film stars Chapa himself, depicting his life from a child, to his becoming the head of a notorious American narcotics syndicate. Co-starring in the film are: Jennifer Tilly, Faye Dunaway, Kathleen Quinlan, Robert Wagner, Tommy 'Tiny' Lister, Gary Busey, Joanna Pacula, Rachel Hunter, and Stacy Keach.

Written and produced by Troy Barker, Damian Chapa and Carlton Holder. The film's producers are Warren Barnhart, Berta Bennett, Chuck Binder, Chris Chanowski, Edmund Druilhet, Roffe Joundour, Alex Pinedo, H. Evie Ryland, Robert Star, Harry Sutherland and Lloyd White.

== Cast ==
- Damian Chapa as "Kilo"
  - Nicholas LoCash as Young "Kilo"
- Sal Lopez as "Loco"
- Emilio Rivera as Rudy
- Jennifer Tilly as Sebeva
- Faye Dunaway as Attorney General Navarro
- Ismael 'East' Carlo as Manny
- Joanna Pacula as Jessica Lancaster
- Robert Wagner as Paul Fisch
- Gary Busey as Lars
- Stacy Keach as Governor Lancaster
- Brad Dourif as Cyrus
- Ralf Moeller as Special Agent Kurt Meyers
- Melora Hardin as Jane
- Kathleen Quinlan as Judge Scorsi
- Ricco Chapa as Miguel Jr.
- Henry Pittman as "C-Note" (credited as Henery Pittman)
- Ileanna Simancas as Christina
- Jay Tavare as Special Agent Sanchez
- Tom Lister Jr. as "T-Bone" (credited as Tiny Lister)
- Numa Perrier as Tanya
- Adriana Millan as "Flaca"
- Onahoua Rodriguez as "Pistola"
- Penny Hammond as Molly Lancaster (credited as Penny Hamond)
- Jason Cairns as Nick
- Rachel Hunter as Newscaster
- Eduardo Antonio Garcia as Loreno (uncredited)
- Michael Bentt as "Loc N Load" (uncredited)
- Ski Carr as "KiKi" (uncredited)
- Ernest M. Garcia as "Mountain" (uncredited)
- Mike Moroff as "Gordo" (uncredited)
- Ciara O'Brien as Keira (uncredited)
- Sewell Whitney as Congressman (uncredited)
- Christine Young as Fisch's Daughter (uncredited)
