= Damian Chapa =

American actor and filmmaker

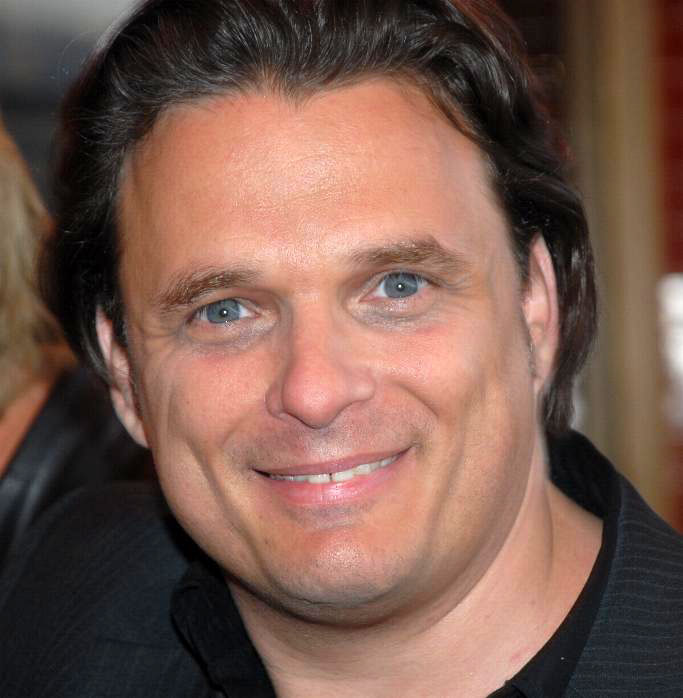
- Born: Damian Robert Chapa; October 29, 1963 (age 63); Dayton, Ohio, U.S.
- Occupations: Actor; director; producer; writer
- Years active: 1989–present
- Spouses: Natasha Henstridge (m. 1995; div. 1996) Ciara O'Brien (m. 1998; div. 2003)
- Children: Presley Scorsese Chapa (b. 2007)

Damian Robert Chapa (born October 29, 1963) is an American actor, film director, screenwriter, and producer.

== Biography ==
Damian Chapa was born in Dayton, Ohio, U.S. to a father of Mexican and Italian descent and a mother of German, Irish and Native American descent. He lives in San Antonio, Texas.

He appeared as Ken Masters in Raúl Juliá's final film Street Fighter, based on the video game Street Fighter II: The World Warrior. Chapa played the part of evangelist Leroy Jenkins in the 2002 film The Calling. He played Miklo Velka in Taylor Hackford's Blood In Blood Out.

In 2011, Chapa was arrested in Madrid on allegation of raping former girlfriend Roxanna Foell, whom he had met in Germany in 2006 at the Berlin Film Festival. He was later transferred to a Munich jail, and released after seven weeks. Chapa filed a $1.3 million lawsuit for damages against Foell in a California court, and the case was later disposed by judge Malcolm Mackey.

== Filmography ==
Year	Title	Role	Notes
1992	Under Siege	Tackman	
1993	Blood In Blood Out	Miklo	
1994	Menendez: A Killing in Beverly Hills	Lyle Menendez	
1994	Dead Connection	Detective Louis Donato	
1994	Saints and Sinners	Pooch	
1994	Street Fighter	Ken Masters	
1996	The Rockford Files: Godfather Knows Best	Scotty Becker	
1997	Midnight Blue	Martin	
1997	Walker, Texas Ranger	Texas DPS Sgt. Santiago Perez	
1997	Money Talks	Carmine	
1998	Kill You Twice	Mickey	Also writer and director
1998	Exposé	Jason Drake	
1999	Cypress Edge	Beau McCammon	
1999	Hitman's Run	Paolo Catania	
1999	Sometimes They Come Back... for More	Dr. Carl Schilling	
2000	The Lonely Life of Downey Hall	Downey Hall	Also director
2000	Facade	Raul Belliard	
2001	U.S. Seals II: The Ultimate Force	Ratliff	
2002	Are You a Serial Killer	James	Short
2002	Bad Karma	Mr. Miller	Uncredited
2002	The Calling	Leroy Jenkins	Also director, producer
2003	Betrayal	Tony	
2004	Shade of Pale	Thomas	Also director and producer
2004	El Padrino	Kilo	Also director, producer
2005	Man of Faith	Preacher	
2006	I.R.A.: King of Nothing	Bobby O'Brien	Also director, producer
2007	Fuego	Fuego	Also director
2007	Mexican American	Tony	Also director and producer
2008	Mexican Gangster	Johnny Sun	Also director and producer
2008	El Padrino II	Kilo	Also director
2009	Polanski Unauthorized	Roman Polanski	Also director and producer
2009	Bobby Fischer Live	Bobby Fischer	Also director and producer
2009	Bad Cop	Angel Almaraz	Also director
2011	Vatos Locos	Mickey Solice	Also director and producer
2011	Brando Unauthorized	Marlon Brando	Also director and executive producer
2012	The DSK Story	Crowe	Also writer and director
2012	Mafia Man: Robstown Gangster	Eduardo	Also writer and director
2014	Love, Hate & Security	Nick Angelo	Also director
2014	Father Rupert Mayer	Lt. Murphy	Also director, writer and cinematographer
2016	Enemy Within	Nick	Also writer and director
2016	The Last Wizard	Jack Armstrong	Also writer
2016	La Rancherita	Mr. King	Also director, producer, writer
2016	Streets of East L.A.	Mickey Solis	Also director and writer
2018	Luz	Michael	Also writer and director
2020	Pistollera	Rico	Also director
2020	Rifkin's Festival	Festivalgoer	
2020	Latin Hitman	Ramos Ferrari	Also director, writer and producer
2021	Dark Light	Sonny Pietra	Also writer and director
2021	The Devil's Ring	Mr. Deville	
2022	Iron Cross: The Road to Normandy	Brahms	
2023	Born Into a Dream	Scribe of Dreams	Also writer and director
2023	Mexican Gangster 2: Venganza	Johnny Sun	Also writer and director
2023	Mexican Connection	Antonio D'Angelo	Also director
2024	Last Kiss in Paris	David Michaels	Also writer and director
2024	Room 4D	Donny (club owner)	
TBA	Adam Weishaupt: The Illuminati	Marquis de Sade	Also writer and director
TBA	Cry Me an Ocean	Ray Coast	Also director
TBA	Chicano Gangster	Guero	Also writer and director
TBA	Secret of the Shroud	Father Miller	Also writer and director
TBA	The Mystery of Coral Castle	CIA Agent Lemont	Also writer and director
TBA	Death of a Witch	John Todd	Also director

=== Television ===
	Year	Title	Role	Notes
2023	FBI: Most Wanted	Warden Smith	Episode: "These Walls"	
