= Sasquatch Mountain =

2006 television film

- Theatrical release poster
- Written by: Michael Worth
- Directed by: Steven R. Monroe
- Starring: Lance Henriksen; Cerina Vincent; Michael Worth; Rance Howard; Craig Wasson; Tim Thomerson
- Music by: Corey A. Jackson
- Original language: English

Production
- Cinematography: Neil Lisk
- Editor: Kristina Hamilton-Grobler
- Running time: 90 min.
- Production companies: Curb Entertainment; Grizzly Peak Films

Original release
- Network: Sci Fi Channel
- Release: 2006

Sasquatch Mountain (also called Devil on the Mountain) is a 2006 American science fiction film produced by Grizzly Peak Productions for the Syfy channel, and directed by Steven R. Monroe.

== Synopsis ==
A lonely tow-truck driver (Lance Henriksen) gets caught in a deadly struggle between a pair of bank robbers with a beautiful hostage (Cerina Vincent), local cops, and a monster that has come down from the Arizona mountains to eat human flesh.

== Cast ==
- Lance Henriksen as Chase Jackson
- Cerina Vincent as Erin Price
- Michael Worth as Vin Stewart
- Rance Howard as Harris Zeff
- Craig Wasson as Travis Cralle
- Tim Thomerson as Eli Van Cleef
- Raffaello Degruttola as Wade Clay
- Karen Kim as Kayla Keller
- Frank Rivera as Ken Robinson
- Chris Engen as Chris Logan
- Melanie Monroe as Raquel Jackson
- Kate Connor as Sara Jackson
- Alex Ballar as Kyle Carson
- Candace Raquel as Priscilla Moore
- Bob Harter as Sirom Sauls
- David Keller as Stanley Newton
- Dan Taylor as himself
- Tiny Ron as Sasquatch
- Denise Kerwin as Sue (uncredited)
- Jamie Gannon as Stranded Caller

== Filming location ==
The movie was filmed in Flagstaff and Williams, Arizona.

== Premiere ==
Its world premiere was the fifth most watched show of the week on the Sci-Fi Channel.
