= One Night at McCool's =

2001 American film by Harald Zwart

- Theatrical release poster
- Directed by: Harald Zwart
- Written by: Stan Seidel
- Produced by: Michael Douglas; Allison Lyon Segan
- Starring: Liv Tyler; Matt Dillon; Paul Reiser; John Goodman; Michael Douglas; Andrew Silverstein; Reba McEntire
- Cinematography: Karl Walter Lindenlaub
- Edited by: Bruce Cannon
- Music by: Marc Shaiman
- Production companies: October Films; Furthur Films
- Distributed by: USA Films
- Release date: April 27, 2001
- Running time: 92 minutes
- Country: United States
- Languages: English; Spanish
- Budget: $18 million
- Box office: $13.5 million

One Night at McCool's is a 2001 American neo-noir black comedy film written by Stan Seidel, directed by Harald Zwart, and starring Liv Tyler, Matt Dillon, Paul Reiser, John Goodman, Michael Douglas, Andrew Silverstein, Reba McEntire and June Lockhart.

== Plot ==
The majority of the film consists of Randy, Carl and Dehling reciting their experiences with Jewel, each narrating over what they consider to be the real version of the recent events. Scenes are often re-enacted twice, with different accounts contradicting each other. Randy believes he is an innocent victim in the whole story while Dehling thinks Randy is a slimy, macho, abusive thug. Carl is convinced that every woman is in love with him and he is a gift to all women.

Randy, a bartender sits down next to Mr. Burmeister at a bingo hall and recounts his story of how he got to where he is. One night while working at McCool's, Randy apparently saves a woman named Jewel from her boyfriend "Utah". Carl, Randy's distant relative who was at McCool's that night, recounts to his therapist that he was sleeping off his drunkenness in his car and saw the altercation but noticed Jewel put on an act afterwards to make Randy take her home. After he takes her to his home and they sleep together, Jewel reveals to Randy that she is a con-woman and Utah arrives shortly thereafter to rob his house. Unfortunately, Randy does not have many possessions, so Utah decides to have Randy open the safe at McCool's for its cash. During the robbery, Utah is shot in the head by Jewel and Randy takes the blame for her, claiming self-defense. Detective Dehling (also recounting the past events to his friend; Father Jimmy) investigates the matter accordingly but believes Randy is not telling the whole truth.

Jewel soon moves in with Randy at his house and begins to purchase new furniture and redecorating the interior of the house, much to Randy's chagrin as he lost his job at McCool's since the owner believes the reputation is worth more than what was in the safe. Also infatuated with Jewel, Dehling begins hearing half of an argument that Randy and Jewel have, causing him to paint Randy as an abusive, overly macho husband to Jewel, despite Randy's pleas that they are not. With Randy not having a job and Jewel continually removing his stuff, save for the snow globes his mother collected, Jewel manipulates Randy to rob his former boss of some sports memorabilia and other items. She later comes home with a different car, saying she was "borrowing it from a friend" and later they pull a scam on one of Carl's associates at his law firm. Unfortunately, the robbery does not go as planned and Jewel is forced to kill him with a DVD player while Randy was trapped in a closet. Though they get away, Jewel and Randy continue to fight.

Detective Dehling investigates the murder as he soon finds that Carl is related to Randy. Becoming more infatuated with Jewel, and noticing a black eye on her, Dehling forces Randy out of his own house and cites he will put a restraining order on Randy. Randy notices Jewel smile from the inside of the house, realizing he has been scammed for everything he has. Dehling later comforts Jewel and they later have sex. Meanwhile, Carl continues with his story that he believed Jewel came onto him at a gathering he held with his family, Randy and Jewel, which Carl was happy to oblige as he was having marital problems. Back at the bingo hall, Randy finishes his story to Burmeister and they both leave and head to a distant motel where Randy gives him $10,000 to kill Jewel. Randy calls Carl from the motel and Carl is excited to hear since he wants to experience sex with Jewel again. Arriving at the house, Carl puts on some bondage outfits while Detective Dehling arrives in his uniform with flowers. Randy tries to warn Carl to stay away from his house, but has to steal a car to make sure Burmeister does not kill Carl as well. As they all converge in the house and an argument erupts with each person claiming to be Jewel's boyfriend, Utah's twin brother Elmo suddenly appears, heavily armed and demanding to know which one killed his brother. Burmeister is watching from outside when Jewel catches him by surprise. Both infatuated with each other, the two decide to leave when Elmo fires at them and a shootout begins. Carl escapes on foot while both Elmo and Dehling die from gunshots. Randy survives unscathed but steeps in the destruction in his house.

Jewel gets in Burmeister's car which he tells her of his house, big screen TV and DVD player; all things that she has ever wanted and leaves the last snow globe on the sidewalk before driving away. Carl continues his escape until he is nearly hit by a car and he rejoices briefly before being crushed by a dumpster.

== Cast ==
- Liv Tyler as Jewel
- Matt Dillon as Randy
- John Goodman as Detective Dehling
- Paul Reiser as Carl
- Michael Douglas as Mr. Burmeister
- Richard Jenkins as Father Jimmy
- Reba McEntire as Dr. Green
- Andrew Silverstein as Utah / Elmo
- Andrea Bendewald as Karen
- Eric Schaeffer as Greg Spradling
- Leo Rossi as Joey Dinardo
- Sandy Martin as Bingo vendor woman
- June Lockhart (uncredited)
- Helen Hunt (deleted scenes) as Truck Driver

== Production ==
Writer Stan Seidel, who died prior to the film's release, drew much of the film's material from Randy Dana's days as a bartender at Humphrey's Restaurant & Tavern, a college bar located in the midst of St. Louis University.

== Release ==
=== Box office ===
The film disappointed monetarily, grossing $13.5 million out of its $18 million budget in theatrical release.

=== Critical reception ===
The film garnered mixed-to-poor reviews. On the review aggregator website Rotten Tomatoes, 34% of 104 critics' reviews are positive, with an average rating of 4.8/10. The website's consensus reads: "Critics say this blend of film noir and screwball comedy seems to think itself more clever and hip than it actually is. Also, the crucial femme fatale needs a better, more mature actress than Tyler." Metacritic, which uses a weighted average, assigned the film a score of 46 out of 100, based on 32 critics, indicating "mixed or average" reviews.

Roger Ebert gave the film two-and-a-half out of four stars, stating in his review that the film "is so busy with its crosscut structure and its interlocking stories that it never really gives us anyone to identify with" but that "it has a lot of fun being a near miss."

=== Home media ===
The film was released on VHS and DVD on October 9, 2001 by USA Home Entertainment.
