= Jeff Langton =

American actor

- Height: 6 ft −1 in (180 cm)
- Website: http://www.jefflangton.com/

Jeff Langton (born December 11, 1956) is an American actor and martial arts performer and practitioner. He is also a professional boxing trainer, cornerman, and cutman.

== Early life ==
Jeff was born in Pasadena, California and raised between San Jose, California and Brooklyn, New York. His father was a member of the Marine Corps Boxing Team and later trained young Langton in the "sweet science." When Langton was 13, he joined the Police Athletic League and trained as an amateur boxer with Gus Spencer. He also trained at Garden City Boxing Club and Bath Beach Health Club in Brooklyn New York. As a young man he also trained in martial arts as well as boxing. He trained in Tae Kwon Do with Dan Kyu Choi. He became the captain of Choi's Institute of Tae Kwon Do Championship Team and then went on to be California State Tae Kwon Do Champion. He also received a black belt in Tae Kwon Do from Master Byung Yu. He was also the first and original member of the world-famous Ernie Reyes West Coast Demo Team and introduced gymnastics and acrobatics to martial arts demonstration. This legacy continues on, as the format Langton introduced is still used today by West Coast Demo Team in shows all around the world.

After making his way through the competitive world of martial arts, he moved on to film and television. He moved to Los Angeles to pursue acting. In L.A. he training extensively with six-time World Champion Kickboxer Benny Urquidez. He was also a trainer at Benny's school, The Jet Center. During this time he also did live action stunts for Universal Studios.

== Career ==
He began doing stunts for Sylvester Stallone and then acting in movies such as Lionheart, fighting on screen with stars like Jean-Claude Van Damme. After this he starred in films such as Final Impact and Maximum Force, and continued to work on films and television shows like Price of Glory, Matlock, Buffy the Vampire Slayer, and Las Vegas. His background in boxing came in handy as he was asked to train and coach Tommy Morrison in Rocky V. Langton also appears in the movie itself as one of the fighters Tommy Gunn knocks out. In fact, his name appears in the marquee in a montage depicting Tommy Gunn rising through the ranks. Although in the video game, Rocky Legends his character looks nothing like him and his name is changed to Kofi Langton. His most recent role is in the movie Mind Polish: Master Hubbard's Special Reserve, where he plays a scientology spiritual counselor with Tourette's syndrome.

== Filmography ==
- 1986 Cobra (Stunts)
- 1988 Rambo III (Stunts)
- 1989 Road House (Stunts)
- 1989 Tango & Cash (Stunts)
- 1990 Lionheart as Cynthia's Fighter
- 1990 Die Hard 2 as Blue Light Team #2
- 1990 Matlock (1 episode"The Narc) as Narc #2
- 1990 Rocky V as Boxer
- 1990 Lethal Games as Huey
- 1991 Future Kick as Andrews
- 1991 College Kickboxers as Gary Carlisle (uncredited)
- 1992 Final Impact as Jake Gerrard
- 1992 Batman Returns as Clown (uncredited)
- 1992 Maximum Force as Ivan
- 1994 Street Fighter (Stunts)
- 1997 Hollywood Safari as Neal
- 1997 Buffy the Vampire Slayer (1 episode, "Ted") aa Vampire
- 1998 Almost Heroes (Stunts)
- 1998 Jane Austen's Mafia! as Bodyguard (uncredited)
- 2000 Price of Glory as Referee
- 2000 Intrepid (Stunts)
- 2002 Deuces Wild as Gangster (uncredited)
- 2003 Las Vegas ( 1 episode, "Blood and Sand") as Boxing Referee
- 2004 El Padrino as Secret Service Agent (uncredited)
- 2006 Mini's First Time as The Auditor
- 2008 Mind Polish: Master Hubbard's Special Reserve as Frankie Carbo, Mobster #2
- 2010 Taken by Force as Cop
- 2011 Brando Unauthorized as Al Silvani

== Boxing ==
Jeff has worked the corner in over 40 world championship title bouts including Ricardo Mayorga (WBC, IBF), Freddie Pendleton (IBF, WBA), Tony Tucker (NABF, WBC, WBA, WBO), Byron Mitchell (IBF, WBA), Uriah Grant (IBF), Kingsley Ikeke (NABA, WBC), William Abelyan (NABO), and Will Grigsby (IBF).

Jeff Langton has trained world champions of his own such as Terry Davis (NBA, IBA Champ) and Young Dick Tiger (Nigerian Commonwealth Champ). Langton has also trained Hector Pena (6 time world kickboxing champion) and Danny "Hard As" Steel (6 time world kickboxing champion). He learned how to be a cutman from his uncle Al Bonanni who has trained many world champions for Don King. He is a licensed trainer by the State of California and by the Nevada State Athletic Commission. He also owns a private gym for professional boxers and celebrities.

== Martial Arts ==
Jeff Langton is a practitioner of several martial art disciplines.

- Kajukenbo
- Shotokan
- KickBoxing
- Shaolin Kung Fu
- Tae Kwon Do
- Hung Gar
- Escrima
