= Hard Rain (film) =

1998 disaster action thriller film by Mikael Salomon

- Theatrical release poster
- Directed by: Mikael Salomon
- Written by: Graham Yost
- Produced by: Ian Bryce; Mark Gordon; Gary Levinsohn
- Starring: Morgan Freeman; Christian Slater; Randy Quaid; Minnie Driver; Ed Asner; Richard Dysart; Betty White
- Cinematography: Peter Menzies Jr.
- Edited by: Amnon David; Paul Hirsch; Gillian L. Hutshing
- Music by: Christopher Young
- Production company: Mutual Film Company
- Distributed by: Paramount Pictures (United States); Nordisk Film Biografdistribution (Denmark); PolyGram Filmed Entertainment (Select territories); Concorde Filmverleih (Germany); Toho-Towa (Japan)
- Release dates: January 16, 1998 (United States); April 3, 1998 (United Kingdom); April 6, 1998 (Germany); May 29, 1998 (Denmark); September 5, 1998 (Japan)
- Running time: 96 minutes
- Countries: United States; Denmark; United Kingdom; Germany; Japan
- Language: English
- Budget: $70 million
- Box office: $19.9 million

Hard Rain is a 1998 disaster action thriller film directed by Mikael Salomon, written by Graham Yost, produced by Ian Bryce, Mark Gordon, and Gary Levinsohn, and starring Morgan Freeman, Christian Slater, Randy Quaid, Minnie Driver, and Ed Asner. An international co-production among the United States, the United Kingdom, Denmark, Germany, and Japan, the film centers on a small Indiana town amidst a natural disaster where a gang attempts to pull off a heist and survive man-made treachery. It received generally negative reviews and was a box-office bomb, grossing $19.9 million against a $70 million budget.

== Plot ==
During a heavy rainstorm, Tom and his uncle Charlie, two armored truck drivers, are collecting money from banks in the town of Huntingburg, Indiana, which has been evacuated due to flooding. They are ambushed by Jim and his gang of armed robbers, Kenny, Mr. Mehlor, and Ray. Charlie calls the National Guard and is shot dead by Kenny as Tom escapes and hides the cash in a cemetery.

The gang chases Tom, who takes refuge in a nearby church. There he is mistaken for a looter by Karen who knocks him out. Tom wakes up in a cell and tells Sheriff Mike Collig about the gang and the money. Mike and Chief Deputy Wayne Bryce leave him locked up and investigate, whilst Deputy Phil is ordered to take Karen out of town. Karen pushes Phil out of the boat to return to protect the church, which she is restoring.

The town's dam operator Hank is forced to open a spillway, causing a large wave and deeper flooding. Tom is trapped in his cell as the water rises. After protecting the church, Karen rescues him and they hide from the gang. Kenny is electrocuted. They enter a house and are mistaken for looters by the elderly residents Doreen and Henry Sears, who have refused to evacuate and are protecting their property. Henry is persuaded to give Tom their boat to return to the armored truck. Resurfacing from the submerged truck, he finds the gang holding the elderly couple hostage. Tom says he will tell them where the money is.

Jim reveals to Tom that the latter's uncle Charlie was in cahoots with the gang, and did not actually call the National Guard; he was only killed because Kenny was not told Charlie was on their side. Tom finds the money has disappeared. They are ambushed by Mike and his deputies plus Hank, who have found Karen and intend to keep the money for themselves.

Mr. Mehlor and Ray are killed in the shootout, and Jim and Tom escape and hide in the church. Wayne takes Karen to her house intending to rape her. The others firebomb the church and drive their boats through the stained glass windows. Karen stabs and kills Wayne. Hank shoots Phil for not shooting Tom when he had the chance.

The dam overtop alarm sounds. Mike suggests Tom and Jim should let Hank and him go with a couple of the bags of money. Tom agrees, but Jim does not. Tom leaves to try to save Karen, before Mike shoots Jim with a revolver he was hiding, although Jim isn't badly hurt. Mike and Hank escape in a boat; Hank is then pushed out by the sheriff and is killed in a gas explosion.

Tom finds Karen handcuffed to a banister. He frees her and they climb to the roof to avoid the water where they are caught by Mike. Jim comes from behind them in a boat. Mike shoots at him, disabling the steering, forcing him to go over the roof. As he does so, the engine breaks off and collides with the sheriff, knocking him into the water. Mike tries to shoot Karen as he grabs a bag of money, but Tom and Jim shoot the corrupt sheriff dead. Tom tells Jim he should leave, just as the Indiana State Police arrive. Jim picks up Mike's bag of money and rows away, as Tom tells Karen the fire damage to her church was not too bad and can be repaired.

== Cast ==
- Christian Slater as Tom
- Morgan Freeman as Jim
- Randy Quaid as Sheriff Mike Collig
- Minnie Driver as Karen
- Ed Asner as Charlie
- Michael Goorjian as Kenny
- Dann Florek as Mr. Mehlor
- Ricky Harris as Ray
- Jay Patterson as Mr. Wellman
- Mark Rolston as Chief Deputy Wayne Bryce
- Peter Murnik as Deputy Phil
- Wayne Duvall as Hank
- Richard Dysart as Henry Sears
- Betty White as Doreen Sears

== Production ==
=== Development ===
The production of the film was a collaborative effort among numerous film studios, one of which was the British Broadcasting Corporation. Christian Slater himself served as co-producer. At one point, John Woo was attached to direct the film, but he left to direct Face/Off instead and the project was taken over by Mikael Salomon.

The film was originally titled The Flood, but it was changed because the film-makers did not want audiences to assume it was primarily a disaster film and not a heist-thriller. A massive flood the previous year that caused millions in damages and which was still fresh in the minds of moviegoers also prompted the name change.

The film was shot in Huntingburg, Indiana, where the film is set (in reality there is no major river or dam nearby, although there are two reservoirs near the town), as well as a $6 million set in an aircraft hangar in Palmdale, California where the B-1 Lancer bomber was manufactured, and some exteriors in Etobicoke, Toronto, Canada.

As of April 2016, upon speaking with the Huntingburg City Office, film historian Adam Nichols was informed of and shown a museum located upstairs in the city office where several props, costumes, media, and production stills are displayed featuring this film and the 1992 film A League of Their Own that was also partially filmed in Huntingburg.

About the ending, Morgan Freeman said: "I played a bad guy in [Hard Rain] and they showed it to an audience – and we're letting an audience tell us what to do now – y'know, and the audience said, 'Well, I don't want him – Morgan can't die!' And I was a thief. 'He should get some money'. We went back into the studio and re-shot it so that I didn't die and I did get some money."

In retrospect Screenwriter Graham Yost said: "That was just supposed to be a western. It was basically a modern day western and it was just so expensive to do that it kind of lost its focus in a way, although Mikael [Salomon] did a great job."

=== Filming ===
In an April 2024 interview, Minnie Driver claimed a producer of the film told her not to wear a wetsuit under her shirt as they wanted her nipples to show. The film's costume designer Kathleen Detoro did not remember the incident, stating "the producers had me supply everyone including crew with wetsuits," and that "Made to order wet suits from (Body Glove) were purchased for all actors and crew. Actors received full wet suit, shortie wet suit, tops, bottoms and booties. It is up to (the) actor to decide what parts they wear or don't wear." A representative for Freeman said the actor "has no recollection of any part of this".

== Release ==
=== Box office ===
Hard Rain opened on the Martin Luther King Jr. Day weekend in 1998 earning fifth place with $7.1 million from Friday to Sunday and $8 million including the holiday Monday. The film made a total gross of $19.9 million in the US against a $70 million production budget.

Due to its poor box office performance in the US, the film was released straight to video in most countries. The film gained a significant following in the video rental market.

=== Critical response ===
Edvins Beitiks of the San Francisco Examiner praised the film, saying "It's fast-moving, it's got fine special effects, the hero and heroine are pure and quick-thinking, the bad people die badly, and the script draws its fair share of laughs." TimeOut.com gave it a positive review, comparing the plot favorably to writer Graham Yost's earlier more financially successful project, Speed, and suggested that it could be considered a spiritual sequel to Speed. StarPulse.com praised the action scenes of Hard Rain yet criticized the plot, calling it "mindless" yet "entertaining". Lawrence Van Gelder of The New York Times gave it a mixed review, praising the cast disaster and special effects but criticizing the plot, concluding "For all the talent and effort involved, Hard Rain turns out to be routine entertainment.

A particularly negative review came from Roger Ebert of the Chicago Sun-Times, who gave the film one star out of a possible four and stated: "Hard Rain is one of those movies that never convince you its stories are really happening. From beginning to end, I was acutely aware of actors being paid to stand in cold water. Suspension of my disbelief in this case would have required psychotropic medications." Although he criticised the plot and some of the casting, he did praise the special effects. On the TV show Siskel & Ebert & the Movies, Ebert and his colleague Gene Siskel gave the film "two thumbs down". Commenting on its commercial performance, Total Film called it the "biggest flop of 1998" but said it deserved to perform better because of its "fun tension-cranking moments". Christopher Young's score was praised.

On review aggregator Rotten Tomatoes, the film holds a 34% approval rating based on 47 reviews with an average rating of 4.6/10. The site's critics consensus reads, "Hard Rain is an implausible heist movie soaked in disaster movie trappings." On Metacritic, the film has a weighted average score of 36 out of 100 based on reviews from 17 critics, indicating "generally unfavorable" reviews. Audiences polled by CinemaScore gave the film an average grade of "B−" on an A+ to F scale.
