= Catfish Blues (film) =

2016 American independent film

- Promotional release poster
- Directed by: Junior Bonner
- Written by: Michael Worth
- Starring: Max Tadman; Lois Stewart; Tim Thomerson
- Production company: Grizzly Peak Films
- Release date: May 28, 2016 (Big Island)
- Running time: 95 minutes
- Country: United States
- Language: English

Catfish Blues is a 2016 American independent film written by Michael Worth and directed by Junior Bonner. It stars Max Tadman and Worth's grandmother Lois Stewart as a pair of friends who spend a summer searching for lost animals in a Northern California town. The film also features veteran actor Tim Thomerson.

Produced by Worth's production company Grizzly Peak Films, Catfish Blues premiered at the 2016 Big Island Film Festival, where it won the Best Family Film and Audience Choice Feature Award.
