= Broken Memories =

2017 American drama film

- Poster
- Directed by: Michael Worth
- Written by: Frankie Lauderdale
- Produced by: Kassi Crews
- Starring: Ivan Sergei, Rance Howard, Kelly Greyson and Cerina Vincent
- Cinematography: Russell Bell
- Edited by: Chuck Crews
- Music by: David Williams
- Production companies: Digital Jungle Pictures and Broken Memories, LLC.
- Distributed by: Freestyle Digital Media
- Release date: November 14, 2017
- Running time: 90 minutes
- Country: United States
- Language: English

Broken Memories is a 2017 American drama film written by Frankie Lauderdale, directed by Michael Worth, and distributed by Freestyle Digital Media. The film stars Ivan Sergei, Rance Howard, Kelly Greyson and Cerina Vincent. The film premiered at the Writers Guild Theater, Beverly Hills on Tuesday, November 14, 2017, and included appearances of Ron Howard and Bryce Dallas Howard.

The film received critical acclaim from Alzheimer’s-related organizations for realistic portrayal of progressing dementia in old age and highlighted the role of caregivers in Alzheimer's nursing.

== Cast ==
- Ivan Sergei as Levi
- Rance Howard as Jasper
- Kelly Greyson as Maggie
- Cerina Vincent as Sara
- Kirk Bovill as Sheriff Bill Watson
- Kassi Crews as Carla
- Chris Fogleman as Dudley
- Jessica Gardner as Gladys
- Travis Guba as Ferlon Ramsey
- Lindsey Lamer as Emmie

== Accolades ==
Award	Date of ceremony	Category	Recipient(s)	Result	Ref.
Accolade Competition	2016	Leading Actor	Rance Howard	Won	
Accolade Competition	2016	Original Score	David Williams	Won	
Accolade Competition	2016	Best Supporting Actress	Kassi Crews	Won	
Accolade Competition	2016	Feature film	Michael Worth, Kassi Crews	Won	
IndieFEST Film	2016	Lead Actor	Rance Howard	Won	
IndieFEST Film	2016	Feature Film	Michael Worth, Kassi Crews	Won	
Sedona Film Festival	2017	Lead Actor	Rance Howard	Nominated	

== Reception ==
On review aggregator website Rotten Tomatoes, the film has a weighted average of 6.9/10 based on 182 reviews. Writing for HuffPost, Julie Spira said "Broken Memories depicts the real-life struggles a family goes through when a loved one suffers from Alzheimer’s disease." Writing for Broadway World, Herbert Paine concluded:"BROKEN MEMORIES gives us the reel to cast about for our own answers while vividly reflecting the struggles that attend our passages from one phase of life to another."

Ron Howard said his father’s performance in the film was “the role of his career to date.”
