= Kathleen Detoro =

American costume designer

- Born: 1958
- Occupation: Costume designer
- Known for: Breaking Bad; The Guest
- Website: Kathleen Detoro Website

Kathleen Detoro (born 1958) is an American costume designer. She has worked mainly in television, most famously on AMC's Breaking Bad. She was also the costume designer for films like The Guest and Hard Rain.

She has been nominated twice for Costume Designers Guild Awards.

== Education ==
Detoro graduated from the Pratt Institute and studied costume design at the Metropolitan Museum of Art Costume Institute.

== Career ==
Detoro is best known for her work on the first four seasons of Breaking Bad, which included the pilot. She helped select clothing, color palettes, and elements like Walter White's alter-ego Heisenberg's black hat. The hat came about after actor Bryan Cranston asked for a way to avoid the sun on set and show creator Vince Gilligan saw a pork-pie hat that he liked. Detoro then had a custom black pork-pie hat made for the show. In 2017, The Hollywood Reporter called Detoro's Walter White costume one of "The Best TV Costumes From the Past Decade". Detoro was also responsible for other elements of Walter White's costume like his Clarks Wallabee shoes, of which she would buy over 60 pairs per season for the production. This inspired the company Clarks to later create a special shoe release in honor of the character.

Detoro has said costume designers "tell the stories through color, shape, and silhouette,"

To describe her costuming on the TV show Blood & Oil Detoro said, "Where there's oil, there's money, and where there's money there is fashion." Detoro has said in multiple interviews that she was excited costuming the show, especially because she was able to work with model and actress Amber Valletta. She noted that sometimes Valletta's past as a fashion model allowed the show to get designer pieces they "wouldn't otherwise be able to get".

She also worked on the feature film Hard Rain in 1998. In television, she worked in the costume department of the show Ally McBeal in the early 2000s and was nominated for a Costume Designers Guild Award for her work .

== Accolades ==
- 2001 Nominated for the Costume Designers Guild Award for Excellence in Contemporary Television for Ally McBeal
- 2003 Nominated for the Costume Designers Guild Award for Excellence in Commercial Costume Design

== Filmography ==
=== Film ===
- The Guest (2014)
- They Come at Night (1998)
- Dead Man on Campus (1998)
- Hard Rain (1998)
- Overnight Delivery (1998, video)
- Scream 2 (1997)
- Univers'l (1997)
- Venus Rising (1995, video)
- The Foot Shooting Party (1994, short)
- Rooftops (1989)
- Zelly and Me (1988)

=== Television ===
- House of Fame (2023, TV series)
- Echo 3 (2022–2023, TV miniseries)
- Council of Dads (2020, TV series)
- Castle Rock (2019, TV series)
- The Crossing (2018, TV series)
- Training Day (2017, TV series)
- Blood & Oil (2015, TV series)
- Chop Shop (2014, TV series)
- Vegas (2012–2013, TV series)
- Grimm (2011, TV series)
- Breaking Bad (2008–2011, TV series)
- Necessary Roughness (2011, TV series)
- Scoundrels (2010, TV series)
- Flashforward (2009, TV series)
- The Cleaner (2008, TV series)
- Justice (2006–2007, TV series)
- Threshold (2005–2006, TV series)
- Close to Home (2005, TV series)
- Skin (2003–2005, TV miniseries)
- Commando Nanny (2004, TV series)
- Ally McBeal (2000-2001, TV series) in the Costume Department
- Get Real (1999, TV series)
- Work with Me (1999, TV series)
- The Boys Are Back (1994–1995, TV series)
- Space Rangers (1993, TV series)
- Likely Suspects (1992, TV series)
- Parker Lewis Can't Lose (1990, TV series)
- ABC Afterschool Specials (1972, TV series)

=== Television films ===
- Kim Possible (2019, TV movie)
- Scalped (2017, TV movie)
- Cocked (2015, TV movie)
- Identity (2014, TV movie)
- Masterwork (2009, TV movie)
- Animals (2009, TV movie)
- Legally Blonde (2003, TV movie)
- Firestarter: Rekindled (2002, TV miniseries)
- The Darkling (2000, TV movie)
- Invisible Child (1999, TV movie)
- My Last Love (1999, TV movie)
- Donor Unknown (1995, TV movie)
- The Great Mom Swap (1995, TV movie) (as Kathleen DeToro)
- Betrayed: A Story of Three Women (1995, TV movie)
- A Place for Annie (1994, TV movie)
- Message from Nam (1993, TV movie)
- Star (1993, TV movie)
- Battling for Baby (1992, TV movie)
- My Son Johnny (1991, TV movie)
- The Marla Hanson Story (1991, TV movie)
- The Heist (1989, TV movie)
