= The Crimson Code =

- Directed by: Jeremy Haft
- Written by: Alex Metcalf
- Produced by: Beau Rogers; Jeff Schenck; Jim Wedaa
- Starring: Patrick Muldoon; Cathy Moriarty; C. Thomas Howell; Fred Ward; Tim Thomerson
- Distributed by: Fine Line Features; Diwangkara Film
- Release date: 3 April 1999
- Running time: 100 minutes
- Country: Canada
- Language: English

The Crimson Code, also known as Red Team, is a 1999 crime thriller film starring Patrick Muldoon, C. Thomas Howell, Cathy Moriarty, Tim Thomerson and Fred Ward.

== Story ==
FBI Agent Jason Chandler (Patrick Muldoon, "Stigmata," "Starship Troopers") has devoted his life to enforcing the law. But on the trail of a series of mysterious murders surrounding some of society's deadliest serial killers, Chandler is forced down a path where no one can be trusted. It develops that psychopathic killers are themselves being meticulously murdered in grisly circumstances. As he searches for the truth, Chandler finds his own life at risk.
