= Michael Worth =

American actor and martial artist (born 1965)

- Born: Michael Troy Worth; January 13, 1965 (age 61); Philadelphia, Pennsylvania, U.S.
- Other name: Mike Worth
- Occupations: Actor, martial actor, screenwriter, director
- Years active: 1983–present

Michael Troy Worth (born January 13, 1965) is an American actor, martial artist, screenwriter, and director.

== Early life ==
Born in Philadelphia in 1965, Worth is from German and Delaware Indian Native American heritage. As a child, he grew up near the Chesapeake Bay before moving to Northern California with his parents. At the age of 11, he directed his first film titled The Tire with a super 8mm camera he had spent his allowance on. He continued making short films and experimental video projects during his youth including The Toad Warriors and The Berkeley Junk Food Massacre.

== Career ==
Sometime later, he moved to Los Angeles, and earned a handful of bit parts in film and television including Pacific Blue and Alien Nation. He lived with his dog in his truck for six months in Venice, California while trying to save money. Surviving on odd jobs and construction work, Worth accepted small parts and worked as a martial arts trainer for George Lazenby.

His first leading role was in the independent action film Final Impact. Variety magazine labeled him a "promising newcomer". Signed to several films with PM Entertainment, he worked through a series of low-budget films before landing the role of "Tommy" on the TV series Acapulco H.E.A.T.. He was also one of the front-runners for the role of Robin in Batman Forever, although the role ultimately went to Chris O'Donnell. Worth ended up having a cameo alongside O'Donnell in one of the film's fight scenes. He also appeared in "The Storytellers" alongside Tippi Hedren.

In 2004, he wrote and directed a micro-budget experimental film, titled Killing Cupid. It earned him a Best Director nomination at the Action On Film Film Festival in 2005 as well as "Best Fiction Film" at the "Hollywood Documentary and Fiction Film Festival" in 2006. He continued to act in a variety of small independent films while honing his skills as a filmmaker, ghostwriting for film and television, as well as directing second unit. Worth wrote the screenplays for and starred in the psychological thriller/western film Dual (2005) and the sci-fi/horror film Devil on the Mountain (2006). He also appeared in an episode of the CBS sitcom The King of Queens in 2005.

== Filmography ==
=== Film ===
Year	Title	Role	Notes
1985	The Legend of Billie Jean	Surfer	Uncredited
1987	Teen Wolf Too	Teen in crowd	
1992	Final Impact	Danny Davis	
1992	Street Crimes	Tony	
1993	Karate Tiger 7: To Be the Best	Eric Kulhane	
1995	Karate Tiger 8: Fists of Iron	Dale Hartwell	
1997	Sue	Man in Gallery	
1999	The Storytellers	Kristopher Krengle	
1999	The Contract	Detective McGuiness	
2001	U.S. Seals II: The Ultimate Force	Lt. Casey Sheppard	
2002	Essence of Echoes	FBI Agent Kyle McShinsky	
2003	Ghost Rock	John Slaughter	Also writer
2005	Lethal	Eugene	Uncredited
2005	Killing Cupid	Cupid / Marion	Also writer and director
2005	The Nowhere Man	Suicidal Pilot	Also producer
2005	Demon Hunter	Cop	
2006	Sasquatch Mountain	Vin Stewart	Also writer
2006	Left in Darkness	Celia's Father	
2008	God's Ears	Noah Connely	Also writer and director
2008	Dual	Luke Twain	Also writer
2010	Bring Me the Head of Lance Henriksen	Michael	Also writer and director
2011	Fort McCoy	Drunk Soldier	Also co-director
2011	Girls! Girls! Girls!	Ben	
2012	Complacent	Eugene York	
2012	West of Thunder	Kippy	
2012	Rise of the Dinosaurs	Professor Roxton	
2014	Flim: The Movie	Himself	
2015	Seeking Dolly Parton	Josh	Also writer and director
2016	Catfish Blues	Dylan's dad	Also writer
2017	Broken Memories	Buck	Also writer and director
2017	Their Killer Affair	Their Killer Affair	
2018	Lafayette	Jack	
2019	Apple Seed	Prince	Also writer and director
2020	Gunfight at Silver Creek	Carl Macgregor	
2022	The Butterfly Guard	Tyler Bowie	Also director

=== Television ===
Year	Title	Role	Notes
1993–1999	Acapulco H.E.A.T.	Tommy	22 episodes
1995	The John Larroquette Show	Uri	Episode: "Wrestling Matches"
1995	Marker	Clint	Episode: "From Russia Without Love"
1995	Diagnosis: Murder	Pvt. Hansen	Episode: "All American Murder"
1997	Suddenly Susan	Underwear Model	Episode: "I Didn't Write This"
1997, 1998	Buffy the Vampire Slayer	Vampire	2 episodes
1998	Conan the Adventurer	Drakk	Episode: "Homecoming"
1998	Pacific Blue	Mike Thacker	Episode: "Overkill"
1999	Saved by the Bell: The New Class	Sergeant Schilling	Episode: "Don't Follow the Leader"
2005	The King of Queens	Owen	Episode: "Ice Cubed"
2005	The Closer	Jason Murphy	Episode: "You Are Here"
2006	Twenty Good Years	Frank	Episode: "Jeffrey's Choice"
2006	The Unit	Second Man	Episode: "Silver Star"
2009	War Wolves	Jake Gabriel	Television film; also writer/director
2009	Desperate Housewives	Self Defense Instructor	Episode: "What Would I Think of Suicide?"
2011	CSI: NY	Lucius Woods	Episode: "Life Sentence"
2011	Jabberwock	Alec	Television film
