= List of science fiction films of the 1990s =

A list of science fiction films released in the 1990s. These films include core elements of science fiction, but can cross into other genres. They have been released to a cinema audience by the commercial film industry and are widely distributed with reviews by reputable critics.

Collectively, the science fiction films from the 1990s have received 13 Academy Awards, 15 Saturn Awards, five Hugo Awards, one Nebula Award and one Golden Globe Award. Four of these movies were the highest-grossing films of their respective years of release. However, these films also received 10 Golden Raspberry Awards.

== List ==
1990
| Title | Director | Cast | Country | Subgenre/Notes |
|---|---|---|---|---|
| Aftershock | Frank Harris | James Lew, Michael Standing, Elizabeth Kaitan | United States | |
| Back to the Future Part III | Robert Zemeckis | Michael J. Fox, Christopher Lloyd, Mary Steenburgen, Thomas F. Wilson | United States | |
| Bride of Re-Animator | Brian Yuzna | Jeffrey Combs, Bruce Abbott, Claude Earl Jones | United States | Science fiction horror |
| Circuitry Man | Steven Lovy | Dana Wheeler-Nicholson, Jim Metzler | United States | |
| Class of 1999 | Mark L. Lester | Bradley Gregg, Traci Lind, Malcolm McDowell, Pam Grier | United States | |
| Darkman | Sam Raimi | Liam Neeson, Frances McDormand, Colin Friels, Larry Drake | United States | Superhero film |
| The Dark Side of the Moon | D. J. Webster | Robert Sampson, Will Bledsoe, Joe Turkel | United States | |
| Dragon Ball Z: The World's Strongest | Daisuke Nishio | Masako Nozawa (voice), Mayumi Tanaka (voice), Tōru Furuya (voice) | Japan | Fifth anime film in the Dragon Ball franchise |
| Dragon Ball Z: The Tree of Might | Daisuke Nishio | Masako Nozawa (voice), Kōji Nakata (voice), Kōji Yada (voice) | Japan | Sixth anime film in the Dragon Ball franchise |
| Edward Scissorhands | Tim Burton | Vincent Price, Johnny Depp, Winona Ryder, Anthony Michael Hall | United States | |
| Fatal Sky | Frank Shields | Michael Nouri, Darlanne Fluegel, Maxwell Caulfield | United States, Australia, Yugoslavia | (Note: A.k.a. Project: Alien/ No Cause for Alarm.) |
| Frankenhooker | Frank Henenlotter | James Lorinz, Patty Mullen, Louise Lasser | United States | Sci-fi horror comedy |
| The Witches Cave | Yuri Moroz | Segej Zhigunov, Dmitrij Pevcov, Marina Levtova, Nikolaj Karachencov | Soviet Union; Czechoslovakia | action |
| Maroko | Mamoru Oshii | Masako Katsuki (voice), Toshio Furukawa (voice), Kenichi Ogata (voice) | Japan | Comedy drama anime |
| The Handmaid's Tale | Volker Schlöndorff | Natasha Richardson, Robert Duvall, Faye Dunaway, Aidan Quinn | United States | |
| Hardware | Richard Stanley | Dylan McDermott, Stacey Travis, John Lynch | United Kingdom; United States | |
| I Come in Peace | Craig R. Baxley | Dolph Lundgren, Betsy Brantley, Brian Benben | United States | |
| Martians Go Home | David Odell | Randy Quaid, Anita Morris, Margaret Colin, Vic Dunlop | United States | |
| Metamorphosis: The Alien Factor | Glenn Takajian | Tara Leigh, Tony Gigante, Dianna Flaherty, Katherine Romaine | United States | |
| Moon 44 | Roland Emmerich | Michael Paré, Malcolm McDowell, Lisa Eichhorn | Germany; United States | |
| Omega Cop | Paul Kyriazi | Adam West, Ronald L. Marchini | United States | |
| Once Upon a Time... | Galina Barinova | Alla Pokrovskaya (voice) | Soviet Union | Animated short film. Russian title: Когда-то давно..., tr. Kogda-to davno... |
| Peacemaker | Kevin S. Tenney | Robert Forster, Lance Edwards, Hilary Shepard | United States | |
| Predator 2 | Stephen Hopkins | Danny Glover, Gary Busey, Kevin Peter Hall | United States | |
| The Rift | Juan Piquer Simón | Jack Scalia, R. Lee Ermey, Ray Wise | Spain | |
| Rebel Storm | Franky Schaeffer | Zach Galligan, Wayne Crawford, June Chadwick | United States | |
| RoboCop 2 | Irvin Kershner | Peter Weller, Nancy Allen, Dan O'Herlihy, Belinda Bauer | United States | |
| Robot Jox | Stuart Gordon | Gary Graham, Anne-Marie Johnson, Paul Koslo | United States | |
| Shadowzone | J. S. Cardone | Louise Fletcher, David Beecroft, James Hong | United States | |
| Solar Crisis | Richard Sarafian | Tim Matheson, Charlton Heston, Peter Boyle | Japan | |
| Spaced Invaders | Patrick Read Johnson | Douglas Barr, Royal Dano, Ariana Richards | United States | |
| Steel and Lace | Ernest D. Farino | Clare Wren, Bruce Davison, David Naughton | United States | |
| Syngenor | George Elanjian Jr. | Jeff Doucette, Christopher Burgard, Melanie Shatner | United States | Sequel to Scared to Death (1980) |
| A Taste for Flesh and Blood (a.k.a. Flesh Eaters from Outer Space) | Warren F. Disbrow | Greg Scott, Kathy Monks, Warren Disbrow Sr. | United States | filmed in 1989 |
| Total Recall | Paul Verhoeven | Arnold Schwarzenegger, Rachel Ticotin, Sharon Stone, Michael Ironside | United States | (Note: Winner of an Academy Award for Visual Effects (Special Achievement Award) and a Saturn Award for Best Science Fiction Film.) |
| Vaniusha the Newcomer | Vladimir Danilevich | Boris Novikov (voice), Svetlana Kharlap (voice), Aleftina Yevdokimova (voice) | Soviet Union | Stop-motion animation short film |
| Watchers II | Thierry Notz | Marc Singer, Tracy Scoggins, Jonathan Farwell | United States; Canada | |
| A Wind Named Amnesia | Kazuo Yamazaki | | Japan | Anime |
1991
| Title | Director | Cast | Country | Subgenre/Notes |
| Abraxas, Guardian of the Universe | Damian Lee | Marjorie Bransfield, Sven-Ole Thorsen, James Belushi | United States; Canada | |
| And You Thought Your Parents Were Weird | Tony Cookson | Joshua John Miller, Edan Gross, Marcia Strassman | United States | |
| Bill & Ted's Bogus Journey | Peter Hewitt | Keanu Reeves, Alex Winter, William Sadler | United States | |
| Captain America | Albert Pyun | Matt Salinger, Ronny Cox, Scott Paulin | United States; Yugoslavia | |
| Critters 3 | Kristine Peterson | Aimee Brooks, John Calvin, Katherine Cortez | United States | |
| Delicatessen | Jean-Pierre Jeunet, Marc Caro | Dominique Pinon, Marie-Laure Dougnac, Jean-Claude Dreyfus | France | Post-apocalyptic black comedy |
| Dollman | Albert Pyun | Tim Thomerson, Jackie Earle Haley | United States | |
| Dragon Ball Z: Lord Slug | Mitsuo Hashimoto | Masako Nozawa (voice), Toshio Furukawa (voice), Kenji Utsumi (voice) | Japan | Seventh anime film in the Dragon Ball franchise |
| Dragon Ball Z: Cooler's Revenge | Mitsuo Hashimoto | Masako Nozawa (voice), Ryūsei Nakao (voice), Toshio Furukawa (voice) | Japan | Eighth anime film in the Dragon Ball franchise |
| Eve of Destruction | Duncan Gibbins | Gregory Hines, Renée Soutendijk, Michael Greene | United States | |
| Godzilla vs. King Ghidorah | Kazuki Ōmori | Kenpachiro Satsuma, Richard Berger | Japan | |
| The Guyver | Steve Wang | Mark Hamill, Jimmie Walker | United States | |
| Naked Lunch | David Cronenberg | Peter Weller, Judy Davis, Ian Holm, Julian Sands, Roy Scheider | Canada; United Kingdom; Japan | |
| Prayer of the Rollerboys | Rick King | Corey Haim, Patricia Arquette, Christopher Collet | Japan; United States | |
| Riki-Oh: The Story of Ricky | Lam Nai-choi | Fan Siu-wong, Fan Mei Sheng, Ho Ka-Kui | Hong Kong | Action film set in futuristic setting |
| Robotrix | Jamie Luk | Chikako Aoyama, Hiu-Dan Hui, Amy Yip | Hong Kong | |
| The Rocketeer | Joe Johnston | Billy Campbell, Jennifer Connelly, Alan Arkin, Timothy Dalton, Paul Sorvino | United States | |
| Roujin Z | Hiroyuki Kitakubo | | Japan | Anime |
| Star Trek VI: The Undiscovered Country | Nicholas Meyer | William Shatner, Leonard Nimoy, DeForest Kelley, James Doohan | United States | (Note: Won a Saturn Award for Best Science Fiction Film.) |
| Teenage Mutant Ninja Turtles II: The Secret of the Ooze | Michael Pressman | Michelan Sisti, Leif Tilden, Kenn Scott, Mark Caso | United States | |
| Terminator 2: Judgment Day | James Cameron | Arnold Schwarzenegger, Linda Hamilton, Robert Patrick, Edward Furlong | United States | (Note: Winner of Academy Awards for best sound, sound effects editing, and makeup, a Hugo Award for Best Dramatic Presentation, a BSFA Award for media presentation, and a Saturn Award for Best Science Fiction. Highest grossing film of 1991.) |
| The Terror Within II | Andrew Stevens | Andrew Stevens, Stella Stevens, Chick Vennera | United States | |
| Trancers II | Charles Band | Tim Thomerson, Helen Hunt | United States | |
| Until the End of the World | Wim Wenders | William Hurt, Solveig Dommartin, Sam Neill | Germany; Australia; France | |
| Urusei Yatsura: Always My Darling | Katsuhisa Yamada | Fumi Hirano (voice), Toshio Furukawa (voice), Naoko Matsui (voice) | Japan | Sixth film in the Urusei Yatsura film series |
| Vaniusha and the Space Pirate | Vladimir Danilevich | Boris Novikov (voice), Aleftina Yevdokimova (voice), Svetlana Kharlap (voice) | Soviet Union | Stop-motion animation short film |
| Vegas in Space | Phillip R. Ford | Doris Fish, Timmy Spence | United States | |
| Wax or the Discovery of Television Among the Bees | David Blair | William S. Burroughs | United States | |
| Wedlock | Lewis Teague | Rutger Hauer, Mimi Rogers | United States | |
| Zeiram | Keita Amemiya | | Japan | |
1992
| Title | Director | Cast | Country | Subgenre/Notes |
| Alien 3 | David Fincher | Sigourney Weaver, Charles S. Dutton, Charles Dance, Paul McGann | United States; United Kingdom | |
| Bad Channels | Ted Nicolaou | Melissa Behr, Alex Bookston, Michael Caldwell | United States | |
| Critters 4 | Rupert Harvey | Don Opper, Paul Whitthorne, Angela Bassett | United States | |
| Dragon Ball Z: The Return of Cooler | Daisuke Nishio | Masako Nozawa (voice), Toshio Furukawa (voice), Mayumi Tanaka (voice) | Japan | Ninth anime film in the Dragon Ball franchise |
| Dragon Ball Z: Super Android 13! | Daisuke Nishio | Masako Nozawa (voice), Ryūsei Nakao (voice), Toshio Furukawa (voice) | Japan | Tenth anime film in the Dragon Ball franchise |
| Freejack | Geoff Murphy | Emilio Estevez, Mick Jagger, Anthony Hopkins, Rene Russo | United States | |
| Godzilla vs. Mothra | Takao Okawara | Tetsuya Bessho, Satomi Kobayashi | Japan | |
| Honey, I Blew Up the Kid | Randal Kleiser | Rick Moranis, Marcia Strassman, Lloyd Bridges | United States | |
| The Lawnmower Man | Brett Leonard | Pierce Brosnan, Geoffrey Lewis, Dean Norris | United Kingdom, United States, Japan | Produced by Milton Subotsky; Based loosely on the Stephen King novel |
| The Lost World | Timothy Bond | John Rhys-Davies, Eric McCormack, David Warner, Tamara Gorski | United States | |
| Memoirs of an Invisible Man | John Carpenter | Chevy Chase, Daryl Hannah, Sam Neill, Michael McKean | United States | |
| Mindwarp (a.k.a. Brain Slasher) | Steve Barnett | Marta Alicia, Angus Scrimm, Bruce Campbell | United States | (Note: Some sources list this as a 1990 or 1991 release.) |
| Mom and Dad Save the World | Greg Beeman | Jon Lovitz, Teri Garr, Jeffrey Jones, Dwier Brown, Kathy Ireland | United States | |
| Nemesis | Albert Pyun | Olivier Gruner, Tim Thomerson, Cary-Hiroyuki Tagawa | United States | |
| Neon City | Monte Markham | Michael Ironside, Vanity, Lyle Alzado, Nick Klar | United States | |
| Project Shadowchaser | John Eyres | Frank Zagarino, Martin Kove, Meg Foster, Paul Koslo | United States | |
| Prototype X29A | Phillip J. Roth | Brenda Swanson, Robert Tossberg | United States | |
| Rain Without Thunder | Gary O. Bennett | Betty Buckley, Ali Thomas, Carolyn McCormick | United States | Drama |
| Return to the Lost World | Timothy Bond | John Rhys-Davies, Eric McCormack, David Warner, Tamara Gorski | United States | |
| Seedpeople | Peter Manoogian | Sam Hennings, Andrea Roth, Dane Witherspoon, David Dunard | United States | |
| Split Second | Tony Maylam | Rutger Hauer, Kim Cattrall, Neil Duncan | United Kingdom; United States | |
| Tetsuo II: Body Hammer | Shinya Tsukamoto | Tomoroh Taguchi, Shinya Tsukamoto | Japan | |
| The Water Engine | Steven Schachter | Charles Durning, Patti LuPone, William H. Macy | United States | |
| Trancers III | C. Courtney Joyner | Tim Thomerson, Helen Hunt | United States | |
| Universal Soldier | Roland Emmerich | Jean-Claude Van Damme, Dolph Lundgren, Ally Walker | United States | |
| The Wicked City | Leon Lai, Michelle Reis | Jacky Cheung, Leon Lai, Tatsuya Nakadai | Hong Kong | |
1993
| Title | Director | Cast | Country | Subgenre/Notes |
| Acción mutante | Álex de la Iglesia | Antonio Resines, Frederique Feder, Alex Angulo | Spain | |
| Alien Intruder | Ricardo Jacques Gale | Billy Dee Williams, Melinda Armstrong, Maxwell Caulfield | United States | |
| American Cyborg: Steel Warrior | Boaz Davidson | Joe Lara, Nicole Hansen, Yosef Shiloah | United States | |
| Arcade | Albert Pyun | Megan Ward, Peter Billingsley, John de Lancie | United States | |
| Attack of the 50 Ft. Woman | Christopher Guest | Daryl Hannah, Daniel Baldwin, Frances Fisher | United States | Remake of the 1958 classic, Television movie |
| Body Snatchers | Abel Ferrara | Gabrielle Anwar, Terry Kinney, Billy Wirth, Forest Whitaker, Meg Tilly | United States | Based on the Jack Finney novel |
| Carnosaur | Adam Simon | Diane Ladd, Raphael Sbarge, Jennifer Runyon | United States | |
| Coneheads | Steve Barron | Dan Aykroyd, Jane Curtin, Michelle Burke, Michael McKean | United States | |
| Cyborg 2 | Michael Shroeder | Angelina Jolie, Elias Koteas, Jack Palance, Billy Drago | United States | |
| Cyborg Cop | Sam Firstenberg | David Bradley, John Rhys-Davies, Alonna Shaw | United States | |
| Demolition Man | Marco Brambilla | Sylvester Stallone, Wesley Snipes, Sandra Bullock, Nigel Hawthorne | United States | |
| Dragon Ball Z: Broly – The Legendary Super Saiyan | Shigeyasu Yamauchi | Masako Nozawa (voice), Bin Shimada (voice), Hiroko Emori (voice) | Japan | Eleventh anime film in the Dragon Ball franchise |
| Dragon Ball Z: Bojack Unbound | Yoshihiro Ueda | Masako Nozawa (voice), Tesshō Genda (voice), Toshio Furukawa (voice) | Japan | Twelfth anime film in the Dragon Ball franchise |
| Fire in the Sky | Robert Lieberman | D. B. Sweeney, Robert Patrick, Craig Sheffer, Peter Berg, James Garner | United States | |
| Fortress | Stuart Gordon | Christopher Lambert, Loryn Locklin, Kurtwood Smith | Australia; United States | |
| Freaked | Alex Winter, Tom Stern | Alex Winter, Randy Quaid, William Sadler | United States | Science fiction comedy |
| Ghost in the Machine | Rachel Talalay | Karen Allen, Chris Mulkey, Ted Marcoux | United States | |
| Godzilla vs. Mechagodzilla II | Takao Okawara | | Japan | |
| Jurassic Park | Steven Spielberg | Sam Neill, Laura Dern, Jeff Goldblum, Richard Attenborough | United States | (Note: Won Academy Awards for best sound, sound effects editing, and visual effects, a Hugo Award for Best Dramatic Presentation and a Saturn Award for Best Science Fiction Film. Highest grossing film of 1993.) |
| Knights | Albert Pyun | Kris Kristofferson, Lance Henriksen, Kathy Long | United States | |
| Mandroid | Joakim Ersgard | Curt Lowens, Brian Cousins, Jane Caldwell, Michael Della Femina | United States | |
| The Meteor Man | Robert Townsend | Robert Townsend, Marla Gibbs, Eddie Griffin | United States | |
| Patlabor: The Movie 2 | Mamoru Oshii | | Japan | Anime |
| Philadelphia Experiment II | Stephen Cornwell | Brad Johnson, Gerrit Graham, Marjean Holden | United States | |
| RoboCop 3 | Fred Dekker | Robert John Burke, Nancy Allen, Rip Torn, Mako Iwamatsu | United States | |
| Robot Wars | Albert Band | Don Michael Paul, Barbara Crampton, James Staley, Lisa Rinna | United States | |
| Time Runner | Michael Mazo | Mark Hamill, Rae Dawn Chong, Brion James, Mark Baur, Gordon Tipple | Canada | |
1994
| Title | Director | Cast | Country | Subgenre/Notes |
| A.P.E.X. | Phillip J. Roth | Richard Keats, Mitch Cox, Lisa Ann Russell | United States | |
| Automatic | John Murlowski | Olivier Gruner, John Glover, Daphne Ashbrook | United States | |
| Brainscan | John Flynn | Edward Furlong, Frank Langella, T. Ryder Smith | United Kingdom; United States | |
| Circuitry Man 2 | Robert Lovy, Steven Lovy | Vernon G. Wells, Deborah Shelton, Traci Lords | United States | |
| CyberTracker | Richard Pepin | Don "The Dragon" Wilson, Richard Norton, Stacie Foster | United States | |
| Darkside Blues | Yoshimichi Furukawa, Nobuyasu Furukawa | | Japan | Anime |
| Death Machine | Stephen Norrington | Brad Dourif, Ely Pouget, William Hootkins | United Kingdom | |
| Double Dragon | James Yukich | Robert Patrick, Mark Dacascos, Scott Wolf, Alyssa Milano | United States | |
| Dragon Ball Z: Broly – Second Coming | Shigeyasu Yamauchi | Masako Nozawa (voice), Bin Shimada (voice), Takeshi Kusao (voice) | Japan | Thirteenth anime film in the Dragon Ball franchise |
| Dragon Ball Z: Bio-Broly | Yoshihiro Ueda | Masako Nozawa (voice), Takeshi Kusao (voice), Bin Shimada (voice) | Japan | Fourteenth anime film in the Dragon Ball franchise |
| Godzilla vs. SpaceGodzilla | Kensho Yamashita | Jun Hashizume, Megumi Odaka, Akira Emoto | Japan | |
| Mary Shelley's Frankenstein | Kenneth Branagh | Robert De Niro, Kenneth Branagh, Tom Hulce, Helena Bonham Carter, John Cleese | United Kingdom; United States; Japan | Produced by Francis Ford Coppola |
| No Escape | Martin Campbell | Ray Liotta, Lance Henriksen, Stuart Wilson | United States | Sci-fi action |
| Oblivion | Sam Irvin | Richard Joseph Paul, Jackie Swanson | United States | Sci-fi western |
| Project Metalbeast | Alessandro De Gaetano | Barry Bostwick, Kane Hodder, Kim Delaney, Musetta Vander | United States | |
| Project: Shadowchaser 2 | John Eyres | Frank Zagarino, Bryan Genesse, Beth Toussaint | United States | |
| The Puppet Masters | Stuart Orme | Donald Sutherland, Eric Thal, Julie Warner | United States | |
| Solar Force | Boaz Davidson | Michael Paré, Billy Drago, Walker Brandt | United States | |
| Stargate | Roland Emmerich | Kurt Russell, James Spader, Jaye Davidson | United States | (Note: Won a Saturn Award for Best Science Fiction Film.) |
| Star Trek Generations | David Carson | Patrick Stewart, William Shatner, Malcolm McDowell, Jonathan Frakes | United States | |
| T-Force | Richard Pepin | Jack Scalia, Evan Laurie, Bobby Johnston | United States | |
| Guyver: Dark Hero | Steve Wang | David Hayter, Kathy Christopherson | United States | |
| Timecop | Peter Hyams | Jean-Claude Van Damme, Mia Sara, Ron Silver | United States | |
| Trancers 4: Jack of Swords | David Nutter | Tim Thomerson | United States | |
| Trancers 5: Sudden Deth | David Nutter | Tim Thomerson | United States | |
| Watchers 3 | Jeremy Stanford | Wings Hauser, Gregory Scott Cummins, Daryl Keith Roach | United States | Direct-to-Video; Produced by Roger Corman; Based on a novel by Dean Koontz; Filmed in Peru |
1995
| Title | Director | Cast | Country | Subgenre/Notes |
| Alien Terminator | Dave Payne | Maria Ford, Rodger Halston, Emile Levisetti | United States, Mexico | Filmed in Mexico |
| Alien Visitor (a.k.a. Epsilon) | Rolf de Heer | Ulli Birve, Syd Brisbane, Aletha McGrath | Australia; Italy | Drama |
| Attack of the 60 Foot Centerfold | Fred Olen Ray | J.J. North, Ted Monte, Raelyn Saalman, Tim Abell | United States | Comedy film |
| Caged Heat 3000 | Aaron Osborne | Lisa Boyle, Kena Land, Bob Ferrelli | United States | |
| Carnosaur 2 | Louis Morneau | John Savage, Cliff De Young, Don Stroud, Arabella Holzbog | United States | Roger Corman executive producer |
| The City of Lost Children | Jean-Pierre Jeunet, Marc Caro | Ron Perlman, Daniel Emilfork, Judith Vittet | France; Spain; Germany | |
| Congo | Frank Marshall | Laura Linney, Ernie Hudson, Tim Curry, Dylan Walsh | United States | |
| Cyberzone | Fred Olen Ray | Marc Singer, Matthias Hues, Rochelle Swanson | United States | Alternate titles Cyber Zone, Droid Runner, Phoenix 2 |
| Cyborg 3: The Recycler | Michael Shroeder | Zach Galligan, Malcolm McDowell | United States | |
| Cyborg Cop II | Sam Firstenberg | David Bradley, Morgan Hunter, Jill Pierce | United States | |
| The Demolitionist | Robert Kurtzman | Nicole Eggert, Richard Grieco, Susan Tyrrell | United States | |
| Dr. Jekyll and Ms. Hyde | David F. Price | Sean Young, Tim Daly, Lysette Anthony, Harvey Fierstein, Polly Bergen | Canada, United States, United Kingdom | Loosely based on a Robert Louis Stevenson novel |
| Dragon Ball Z: Wrath of the Dragon | Mitsuo Hashimoto | Masako Nozawa (voice), Hiro Yuuki (voice), Ryou Horikawa (voice) | Japan | Sixteenth anime film in the Dragon Ball franchise |
| Fist of the North Star | Tony Randel | Gary Daniels, Costas Mandylor, Chris Penn | United States; Japan | Martial arts |
| Galaxis (a.k.a. Terminal Force) | William Mesa | Craig Fairbrass, John Romualdi, Sam Raimi | United States | |
| Gamera: Guardian of the Universe | Shusuke Kaneko | Tsuyoshi Ihara, Akira Onodera, Ayako Fujitani | Japan | |
| Ghost in the Shell | Mamoru Oshii | | Japan | Anime |
| Godzilla vs. Destoroyah | Takao Okawara | Megumi Odaka, Momoko Kochi | Japan | |
| GoldenEye | Martin Campbell | Pierce Brosnan, Sean Bean, Izabella Scorupco | United Kingdom; United States | |
| Heatseeker | Albert Pyun | Keith Cooke | United States | |
| Johnny Mnemonic | Robert Longo | Keanu Reeves, Dolph Lundgren, Takeshi Kitano | Canada | |
| Judge Dredd | Danny Cannon | Sylvester Stallone, Armand Assante, Diane Lane, Rob Schneider | United States | |
| Memories | Katsuhiro Otomo, Koji Morimoto, Tensai Okamura | | Japan | Anime |
| Mighty Morphin Power Rangers: The Movie | Bryan Spicer | Karan Ashley, Johnny Yong Bosch, Steve Cardenas | United States; Japan | |
| Mosquito | Gary Jones | Gunnar Hansen, Ron Asheton, Steve Dixon | United States | |
| Mutant Species | David A. Prior | Leo Rossi, Ted Prior, Denise Crosby, Grant Gelt | United States | (Note: Also called Bio-Force I.) |
| Nemesis 2: Nebula | Albert Pyun | Sue Price, Chad Stahelski, Tina Cote | United States | |
| Screamers | Christian Duguay | Ron White, Peter Weller | United States; Canada | |
| Species | Roger Donaldson | Natasha Henstridge, Ben Kingsley, Michael Madsen, Forest Whitaker | United States | |
| Strange Days | Kathryn Bigelow | Ralph Fiennes, Angela Bassett, Juliette Lewis | United States | |
| Tank Girl | Rachel Talalay | Lori Petty, Ice-T, Naomi Watts, Malcolm McDowell | United States | |
| Terminal Impact | Yossi Wein | Bryan Genesse, Frank Zagarino, Jennifer Millar | United States | (Note: Also known as Cyborg Cop III) |
| Timemaster | James Glickenhaus | Jesse Cameron-Glickenhaus, Pat Morita, Joanna Pacula | United States | Direct-to-video |
| 12 Monkeys | Terry Gilliam | Bruce Willis, Madeleine Stowe, Brad Pitt, Christopher Plummer | United States | (Note: Winner of a Golden Globe Award for Best Supporting Actor - Motion Picture and a Saturn Award for Best Science Fiction Film.) |
| Vampire Vixens from Venus | Ted A. Bohus | Leon Head, Michelle Bauer, Theresa Lynn | United States | |
| Village of the Damned | John Carpenter | Christopher Reeve, Kirstie Alley, Linda Kozlowski | United States | |
| Virtuosity | Brett Leonard | Denzel Washington, Kelly Lynch, Russell Crowe | United States | |
| Waterworld | Kevin Reynolds | Kevin Costner, Dennis Hopper, Jeanne Tripplehorn, Tina Majorino | United States | (Note: Received a Razzie Award for Worst Supporting Actor.) |
| White Dwarf | Peter Markle | Neal McDonough, Beverley Mitchell | United States | |
| Xtro 3: Watch the Skies | Harry Bromley Davenport | Sal Landi, Andrew Divoff, Robert Culp | United States | |
1996
| Title | Director | Cast | Country | Subgenre/Notes |
| Adrenalin: Fear the Rush | Albert Pyun | Christopher Lambert, Natasha Henstridge, Norbert Weisser | United States | |
| The Arrival | David N. Twohy | Charlie Sheen, Ron Silver, Lindsay Crouse | United States | |
| Barb Wire | David Hogan | Pamela Anderson, Temuera Morrison | United States | (Note: Received a Razzie Award for Worst New Star.) |
| Carnosaur 3: Primal Species | Jonathan A. Winfrey | Scott Valentine, Janet Gunn, Rick Dean | United States | |
| Crossworlds | Krishna Rao | Rutger Hauer, Josh Charles, Stuart Wilson | United States | |
| Escape from L.A. | John Carpenter | Kurt Russell, Stacy Keach, Steve Buscemi | United States | |
| Gamera 2: Attack of Legion | Shusuke Kaneko | | Japan | |
| Independence Day | Roland Emmerich | Will Smith, Bill Pullman, Jeff Goldblum | United States | (Note: Won an Academy Award for Visual Effects and a Saturn Award for Best Science Fiction Film. Highest grossing film of 1996.) |
| The Island of Dr. Moreau | John Frankenheimer | Marlon Brando, Val Kilmer, Fairuza Balk, David Thewlis, Ron Perlman | United States | (Note: Received a Razzie Award for Worst Supporting Actor.) |
| Lawnmower Man 2: Beyond Cyberspace | Farhad Mann | Trever O'Brien, Ellis Williams, Castulo Guerra | United States | |
| Mars Attacks! | Tim Burton | Jack Nicholson, Pierce Brosnan, Sarah Jessica Parker, Michael J. Fox | United States | |
| Memory Run | Allan A. Goldstein | Karen Duffy, Matt McCoy | United States | |
| Multiplicity | Harold Ramis | Michael Keaton, Andie MacDowell | United States | |
| Nemesis 3: Prey Harder | Albert Pyun | Sue Price, Tim Thomerson, Xavier Declie | United States | |
| Nemesis 4: Death Angel | Albert Pyun | Sue Price, Andrew Divoff, Norbert Weisser | United States | |
| Omega Doom | Albert Pyun | Rutger Hauer, Shannon Whirry, Norbert Weisser | United States | |
| Rubber's Lover | Shozin Fukui | | Japan | |
| Sci-Fighters | Peter Svatek | Roddy Piper, Jayne Heitmeyer | United States | |
| Solo | Norberto Barba | Mario Van Peebles, Barry Corbin, William Sadler | United States | |
| Space Truckers | Stuart Gordon | Dennis Hopper, Stephen Dorff, Debi Mazar | United States; Ireland | |
| Star Trek: First Contact | Jonathan Frakes | Patrick Stewart, Jonathan Frakes, Brent Spiner, LeVar Burton, Alice Krige | United States | (Note: Won Saturn Awards for Best Costumes, Best Supporting Actor, and Best Supporting Actress.) |
| Tykho Moon | Enki Bilal | Johan Leysen, Julie Delpy, Tchéky Karyo | France; Germany | |
| Vampirella | Jim Wynorski | Talisa Soto, Roger Daltrey, Richard Joseph Paul | United States | Science fiction action-horror |
| Zone 39 | John Tatoulis | Carolyn Bock, Peter Phelps, William Zappa | Australia | |
1997
| Title | Director | Cast | Country | Subgenre/Notes |
| Abre los ojos (a.k.a. Open Your Eyes) | Alejandro Amenábar | Eduardo Noriega, Penélope Cruz | Spain | |
| Alien Resurrection | Jean-Pierre Jeunet | Sigourney Weaver, Winona Ryder, Ron Perlman, Brad Dourif | United States | |
| Contact | Robert Zemeckis | Jodie Foster, Matthew McConaughey, James Woods, Tom Skerritt | United States | (Note: Winner of a Hugo Award for Best Dramatic Presentation.) |
| Cube | Vincenzo Natali | Maurice Dean Wint, Nicole de Boer, Nicky Guadagni | Canada | |
| Dark Planet | Albert Magnoli | Paul Mercurio, Harley Jane Kozak, Michael York | United States | |
| Deathline | Tibor Takacs | Rutger Hauer, Mark Dacascos | Canada | |
| The End of Evangelion | Hideaki Anno, Kazuya Tsurumaki | | Japan | Anime |
| Event Horizon | Paul W. S. Anderson | Laurence Fishburne, Sam Neill, Kathleen Quinlan | United States | |
| Face/Off | John Woo | John Travolta, Nicolas Cage, Joan Allen, Gina Gershon | United States | |
| The Fifth Element | Luc Besson | Bruce Willis, Gary Oldman, Milla Jovovich, Ian Holm | France | |
| First Encounter (a.k.a. Moral Code) | Redge Mahaffey | Veronica Bird, Holly Fields, Trevor Goddard, Roddy Piper, Stacie Randall | United States | |
| Full Metal Yakuza | Takashi Miike | | Japan | |
| Gattaca | Andrew Niccol | Ethan Hawke, Uma Thurman, Jude Law | United States | |
| The Lost World: Jurassic Park | Steven Spielberg | Jeff Goldblum, Julianne Moore, Pete Postlethwaite | United States | |
| Men in Black | Barry Sonnenfeld | Tommy Lee Jones, Will Smith, Linda Fiorentino | United States | (Note: Won an Academy Award for Makeup and a Saturn Award for Best Science Fiction Film.) |
| Mimic | Guillermo del Toro | Mira Sorvino, Jeremy Northam, Josh Brolin | United States | |
| Nirvana | Gabriele Salvatores | Christopher Lambert, Diego Abatantuono, Emmanuelle Seigner | Italy; France | |
| The Postman | Kevin Costner | Kevin Costner, Will Patton, Larenz Tate, Olivia Williams | United States | (Note: Received Razzie Awards for Worst Picture, Worst Actor, Worst Director, Worst Screenplay and Worst Song.) |
| Sleeping Dogs | Michael Bafaro | Scott McNeil, C. Thomas Howell | Canada; Czech Republic | |
| Spaceman | Scott Dikkers | David Ghilardi, Frederick Husar, Deborah King | United States | |
| Starship Troopers | Paul Verhoeven | Casper Van Dien, Dina Meyer, Denise Richards | United States | |
| The Sticky Fingers of Time | Hilary Brougher | Terumi Matthews, Nicole Zaray, James Urbaniak | United States | |
1998
| Title | Director | Cast | Country | Subgenre/Notes |
| Andromedia | Takashi Miike | Hiroko Shimabukuro, Eriko Imai, Kenji Harada | Japan | |
| Armageddon | Michael Bay | Bruce Willis, Billy Bob Thornton, Liv Tyler, Ben Affleck, Will Patton | United States | (Note: Tied for a Saturn Award for Best Science Fiction Film. Second highest grossing film of 1998.) |
| Dark City | Alex Proyas | Rufus Sewell, Kiefer Sutherland, Jennifer Connelly, William Hurt | United States | (Note: Tied for a Saturn Award for Best Science Fiction Film.) |
| Deep Impact | Mimi Leder | Robert Duvall, Téa Leoni, Elijah Wood, Morgan Freeman | United States | Disaster film |
| Deep Rising | Stephen Sommers | Treat Williams, Famke Janssen, Anthony Heald | United States | |
| Disturbing Behavior | David Nutter | James Marsden, Katie Holmes, Nick Stahl | United States | |
| The Faculty | Robert Rodriguez | Clea DuVall, Jordana Brewster, Laura Harris | United States | |
| Godzilla | Roland Emmerich | Matthew Broderick, Jean Reno, Maria Pitillo | United States; Japan | (Note: Received Razzie Awards for Worst Supporting Actress and Worst Remake or Sequel.) |
| Lost in Space | Stephen Hopkins | William Hurt, Heather Graham, Matt LeBlanc, Gary Oldman | United States | |
| Martian Successor Nadesico: The Motion Picture – Prince of Darkness | Tatsuo Satō | Yūji Ueda, Omi Minami, Houko Kuwashima | Japan | |
| New Rose Hotel | Abel Ferrara | Christopher Walken, Willem Dafoe, Asia Argento | United States | |
| Pi | Darren Aronofsky | Sean Gullette, Mark Margolis, Ben Shenkman | United States | (Note: Won a Directing Award at the Sundance Film Festival.) |
| Six-String Samurai | Lance Mungia | Jeffrey Falcon, Justin McGuire, Stephane Gauger | United States | |
| Skyggen (a.k.a. Webmaster) | Thomas Borch Nielsen | Lars Bom, Puk Scharbau, Jørgen Kiil | Denmark | |
| Soldier | Paul W. S. Anderson | Kurt Russell, Jason Scott Lee, Connie Nielsen | United States | |
| Species II | Peter Medak | Michael Madsen, Natasha Henstridge, Marg Helgenberger | United States | |
| Sphere | Barry Levinson | Dustin Hoffman, Sharon Stone, Samuel L. Jackson | United States | |
| Spriggan | Hirotsugu Kawasaki | | Japan | Anime |
| Star Kid | Manny Coto | Joseph Mazzello, Richard Gilliland, Corinne Bohrer | United States | |
| Star Trek: Insurrection | Jonathan Frakes | Patrick Stewart, Jonathan Frakes, Brent Spiner, LeVar Burton, Donna Murphy | United States | |
| The Truman Show | Peter Weir | Jim Carrey, Laura Linney, Ed Harris, Noah Emmerich | United States | Comedy-Drama |
| The Warlord: Battle for the Galaxy (a.k.a. The Osiris Chronicles) | Joe Dante | | United States | |
| The X-Files | Rob Bowman | David Duchovny, Gillian Anderson, Martin Landau | United States | |
1999
| Title | Director | Cast | Country | Subgenre/Notes |
| A.Li.Ce | Kenichi Maejima | | Japan | Animation |
| The Astronaut's Wife | Rand Ravich | Johnny Depp, Charlize Theron, Joe Morton, Donna Murphy | United States | |
| Barren Illusion | Kiyoshi Kurosawa | Shinji Takeda, Miako Tadano, Yutaka Yasui | Japan | |
| Beowulf | Graham Baker | Christopher Lambert, Rhona Mitra, Oliver Cotton | United States; United Kingdom | |
| Bicentennial Man | Chris Columbus | Robin Williams, Sam Neill, Embeth Davidtz | United States | |
| Deep Blue Sea | Renny Harlin | Thomas Jane, Saffron Burrows, Samuel L. Jackson | United States | |
| Escape from Mars | Neill L. Fearnley | Christine Elise, Peter Outerbridge, Kavan Smith | United States | |
| eXistenZ | David Cronenberg | Jennifer Jason Leigh, Jude Law, Willem Dafoe | Canada; United Kingdom | |
| Furia | Alexandre Aja | Stanislas Merhar, Marion Cotillard, Wadeck Stanczak | France | |
| Galaxy Quest | Dean Parisot | Tim Allen, Sigourney Weaver, Alan Rickman, Tony Shalhoub, Sam Rockwell | United States | (Note: Won a Nebula Award for Best Script, a Hugo Award for Best Dramatic Presentation and a Saturn Award for Best Actor.) |
| Gamera 3: Awakening of Irys | Shusuke Kaneko | Shinobu Nakayama, Ai Maeda, Ayako Fujitani | Japan | |
| Godzilla 2000 | Takao Okawara | Takehiro Murata, Shiro Sano, Hiroshi Abe | Japan | |
| The Iron Giant | Brad Bird | | United States | Animation |
| The Matrix | The Wachowskis | Keanu Reeves, Laurence Fishburne, Carrie-Anne Moss | United States | (Note: Won Academy Awards for Best Film Editing, Best Sound Effects, Best Visual Effects, Best Sound and Saturn Awards for Best Direction, Best Science Fiction Film.) |
| Merry Apocalypse | Sándor Reisenbüchler | | Hungary | Animated short film. Hungarian title: Boldog világvége |
| Muppets from Space | Tim Hill | Andie MacDowell, F. Murray Abraham, Hulk Hogan | United States | |
| My Favorite Martian | Donald Petrie | Jeff Daniels, Christopher Lloyd, Daryl Hannah, Elizabeth Hurley | United States | |
| Peut-être | Cédric Klapisch | Romain Duris, Jean-Paul Belmondo, Géraldine Pailhas | France | Time travel |
| Progeny | Brian Yuzna | Arnold Vosloo, Jillian McWhirter, Brad Dourif, Lindsay Crouse | United States | |
| Star Wars: Episode I – The Phantom Menace | George Lucas | Liam Neeson, Ewan McGregor, Natalie Portman, Ian McDiarmid, Frank Oz | United States | (Note: Received a Razzie Award for Worst Supporting Actor. Highest grossing film of 1999.) |
| The Thirteenth Floor | Josef Rusnak | Craig Bierko, Armin Mueller-Stahl, Gretchen Mol | United States | |
| The Time Shifters (a.k.a. Thrill Seekers) | Mario Azzopardi | Casper Van Dien, Catherine Bell, Theresa Saldana | United States | |
| Universal Soldier: The Return | Mic Rodgers | Jean-Claude Van Damme, Michael Jai White, Heidi Schanz | United States | |
| Virus | John Bruno | Jamie Lee Curtis, William Baldwin, Donald Sutherland | United States | |
| Wing Commander | Chris Roberts | Freddie Prinze Jr., Saffron Burrows, Matthew Lillard | United States | |

== See also ==
- History of science fiction films

== Sources ==
- Muir, John Kenneth (2011). Horror Films of the 1990s. Jefferson, North Carolina: McFarland. ISBN 978-0-786-48480-5.
