= Adrenalin: Fear the Rush =

- DVD cover
- Directed by: Albert Pyun
- Written by: Albert Pyun
- Produced by: Tom Karnowski; Gary Schmoeller
- Starring: Christopher Lambert; Natasha Henstridge; Norbert Weisser
- Cinematography: George Mooradian
- Edited by: Ken Morrisey
- Music by: Tony Riparetti
- Production companies: Filmwerks; Largo Entertainment; Toga Productions
- Distributed by: Legacy Releasing
- Release date: November 29, 1996
- Running time: 77 minutes (U.S.); 94 minutes (DVD)
- Country: United States
- Language: English
- Box office: $37,536

Adrenalin: Fear the Rush is a 1996 American science fiction-action film written and directed by Albert Pyun and starring Christopher Lambert and Natasha Henstridge. It is set in an alternative future in 2007, where the Russian Federation has collapsed and Eastern Europe is in disarray. Out of this chaos an unknown virus covers the Earth and eventually the United States.

== Plot ==
The story is set in an alternative year 2007. After the fall of Communism, Eastern Europe has descended into anarchy. Out of the chaos comes a mysterious virus that eventually kills everyone who is exposed to it. The virus eventually reaches the United States through Boston, and the city is quarantined. A wall is built, cutting Boston off from the "mainland". All foreign immigrants are barred from entering the US since they may be carriers of the virus. The only people allowed out of the city are those with special passports, only available to those working with a government agency or through the black market.

Officer Delon (Henstridge) is a mother who desperately needs to get away from the quarantined city. She is about to give her son a black-market passport to the safe-zone when she is called in to duty.

A gang has been slaughtered by some kind of creature and the police are investigating. The monster has superhuman abilities including speed and strength. The team of police officers, including Delon and Lemieux (Lambert), are sent into the sewer system to capture or kill the creature. Slowly, the team is killed off one by one until only Delon and Lemieux remain. Delon stumbles across a team of scientists sent to kill the creature themselves. They know the creature is the source of the deadly virus and if it is not killed, it will "explode" and spread the virus all over Boston. Delon is then captured by the creature, along with two others. Delon eventually manages to kick the creature unconscious in order to gain enough time to break her restraints, grab a pistol, and kill it with numerous shots.

Delon is later rewarded with two passports to the safe-zone, one for her and for her son.

== Cast ==
- Christopher Lambert as Officer Lemieux
- Natasha Henstridge as Officer Delon
- Norbert Weisser as Cuzo
- Elizabeth Barondes as Wocek
- Xavier Declie as Volker
- Craig Davis as Suspect
- Nicholas Guest as Captain B. Rennard
- Andrew Divoff as CIA Operative Phillip Sterns
- Jon Epstein as General Waxman

== Production ==
Originally to be shot in Prague, the shoot location was changed when it was decided to use the Croatian production team who previously worked with Pyun on Captain America in 1989. The shoot was scheduled for 16 days and Lambert worked for 10 days. Pyun would return to Bratislava to work with the same production team for Omega Doom, Crazy Six and the Urban trilogy.

Stylistically, Pyun wanted to create a real time experience and shot the film as a news crew might cover a war. There was less reliance on narrative and traditional movie plotting, with the film being more akin to a documentary style, where action revealed the story and character. Pyun wanted longer takes with less coverage for editing to give the audience a "you-are-there" feeling.

The film was shot in Bratislava, Slovakia for three weeks, with second unit work in Mostar, Bosnia. Star Natasha Henstridge noted the environments were unsavory - "we filming in underground caves and old buildings, some that we weren't even allowed to be in they were so dangerous" - and cold due to being wet, moist and damp. Henstridge found it a much more difficult experience than her film debut Species, with "hard work and long hours" as she faced the physical work - "I had to hang from this grate 20 feet in the air. I had to climb down wearing all this wiring. I got hung from the ceiling" - and even pulled a hamstring following a running sequence.

The film was heavily re-edited and reshot under orders of Bob Weinstein of Dimension Pictures. The major changes installed by Weinstein were resetting the film from Romania to Boston, U.S.A. and making the virus infection the principal plot device. The Romanian flag may still be seen on the characters' uniforms.

Future Rogue Pictures president, Andrew Rona, supervised the re-edit for Dimension Pictures. The rewrites for the reshoots were done by Rand Ravich, who would later create the short lived television series Life.

== Release ==
Several versions of the film are in distribution. The official US version is 76 minutes long. There is a European/UK (Polygram) version that is 102 minutes long. Writer/director Albert Pyun had stated in interviews that he intended to restore and release a 110 minutes director's cut of the film. This version is set entirely in Romania and has minor virus aspect in its plot.

== Reception ==
The film received mainly negative reviews, getting a 0% on Rotten Tomatoes, based only on 5 reviews.
