= Nemesis (1992 film) =

1992 film by Albert Pyun

- Theatrical release poster
- Directed by: Albert Pyun
- Written by: Rebecca Charles
- Produced by: Tim Karnowski; Eric Karson; Ash R. Shah
- Starring: Olivier Gruner; Tim Thomerson; Cary-Hiroyuki Tagawa; Merle Kennedy; Yuji Okumoto; Marjorie Monaghan; Brion James; Deborah Shelton
- Cinematography: George Mooradian
- Edited by: Mark Conte; David Kern
- Music by: Michel Rubini
- Production company: Greenleaf Productions
- Distributed by: Imperial Entertainment
- Release dates: 26 December 1992 (Japan); 29 January 1993 (U.S.)
- Running time: 95 minutes
- Country: United States
- Language: English
- Box office: $2 million

Nemesis is a 1992 American cyberpunk action film directed by Albert Pyun and starring Olivier Gruner, Tim Thomerson, Cary-Hiroyuki Tagawa, Yuji Okumoto, Marjorie Monaghan, Brion James and Deborah Shelton. Set in a near future world populated by androids, the film centers on Alex Rain (Gruner), a cybernetically-enhanced, ex-counterterrorism operative charged by his former employers with assassinating his former lover, the leader of an underground militant group. This is the first installment in the Nemesis film series, and was followed by four direct sequels and a spinoff film. After premiering in Japan, it was released in the United States by Imperial Entertainment in January 29, 1993.

== Plot ==
In the year 2027, illegal androids have become commonplace, and many criminals enhance themselves with cybernetic components, making them "more than human". Alex Rain is a disillusioned assassin/bounty hunter for the LAPD. During a routine mission, he is attacked by a militant group known as The Red Army Hammerheads. Nearly killed by the surviving leader, Rosaria, Alex resists her assertion that he is a mindless robot: "Eighty-six point five percent [of him] is still human."

After months of cybernetic reconstruction and recovery, Alex tracks Rosaria to Baja and kills her. Soon after this, his handlers show up—his former lover Jared, who is an android, and another android, Sam. Alex decides he has had enough and leaves the LAPD, becoming a freelance hustler and triggerman. However, his LAPD bosses are just letting him run free for a while. His old boss Commissioner Farnsworth has him kidnapped and brought in for one final assignment. According to Farnsworth, Jared has stolen vital security information regarding an upcoming summit between Japan and the United States, and must be stopped before she leaks the plans to the Hammerheads. Alex is told by Farnsworth that a bomb was implanted in his heart during his latest repairs. He is given three days to find Jared before she meets with the leader of the Hammerheads, Angie-Liv; otherwise, the bomb will detonate and kill him. After flying to the town of Shang-Loo on Java, he is turned loose as bait for Jared.

In reality, the Hammerheads are not only battling against government control of people's lives, but for humanity's future. A newly-designed android is infiltrating the higher echelons of human society, copying the minds of powerful leaders into synthetic bodies, Farnsworth among them - who has been replaced by Sam who was redesigned to look like him. Jared threatens their plans, and so Alex's real mission is to smoke her out for the synthetics to destroy. Burnt-out, Alex halfheartedly begins his search, checking into a local hotel. He is soon intercepted by Julian, a cyborg representing Jared. She tells him he is being followed by an LAPD strike team led by "Farnsworth", waiting for the opportunity to hit the Hammerheads and Jared.

It turns out that Jared was fatally wounded in her escape from LA, requiring her memory core to be salvaged from her body. After removing a surveillance device implanted in Alex's eye, Julian injects him with a digital scrambler that prevents the bomb from being remotely detonated. She gives him Jared's memory core, enabling him to talk to her. The strike team storms the hotel and Julian sacrifices herself to allow Alex to escape.

Alex eventually joins up with a local woman, Max Impact, who acts a scout for the Hammerheads while fronting as a tour guide. She is also the sister of Rosaria, the woman he had killed in Old Baja. While she wants Alex dead, her loyalty to the freedom fighters comes first. He is brought to the Hammerheads and is convinced by Angie-Liv to join their cause. Unfortunately, the strike team tracks them down, leading to a shootout and chase through the rundown city. Most of the Hammerheads, including Angie-Liv, are killed by Farnsworth's men. Alex saves Max's life, eventually earning her forgiveness. In a confrontation with Farnsworth, Alex shoots him with a grenade launcher, apparently killing him.

Alex and Max arrive at a secret hangar where Yoshiro, a surviving Hammerhead, is waiting. While launching their escape vehicle, an aerodyne, they are attacked by the cyborg Farnsworth, reduced to his mechanical endoskeleton. Alex defeats him, but suffers grave injuries in the process and discovers just how much of him really is synthetic. Alex brings Jared's core to another Hammerhead compound where they will be able to destroy the labs being used to duplicate people. Unfortunately this means wiping her memory from the core, effectively killing her. Heavily bandaged and temporarily blind, Alex is forced to say goodbye.

Sneaking into L.A. and hunting down the synthetic agents, Alex corners Farnsworth's right-hand man Germaine on the helipad of LAPD headquarters. Despite Germaine's protests that he cannot hope to kill all the synthetics, Alex shoots him. Before she died, Jared told Alex that the real Commissioner Farnsworth left him a letter at an old drop location. In it, his former mentor apologizes for his sometimes rough treatment, reminding him that they all have to do what is right. Alex walks off with his new partner, Max, and they joke about how they are going to smuggle his synthetic body through airport customs: "Piece by piece, Max..."

== Cast ==
- Olivier Gruner as Alex Rain
- Tim Thomerson as Commissioner Sam Farnsworth
- Cary-Hiroyuki Tagawa as Angie-Liv
- Merle Kennedy as Max Impact
- Yuji Okumoto as Yoshiro Han
- Marjorie Monaghan as Jared
- Brion James as Maritz
- Deborah Shelton as Julian
- Nicholas Guest as Germaine
- Vincent Klyn as Michel
- Thom Mathews as Marion
- Marjean Holden as Sam
- Jennifer Gatti as Rosaria
- Thomas Jane as Billy
- Jackie Earle Haley as Einstein
- Borovnisa Blervaque as Morico
- Sven-Ole Thorsen as Cyborg
- Rob Carlton as Waiter

== Production ==
=== Development and writing ===
Nemesis was first conceived as Albert Pyun's last film under a three-picture contract with Cannon drawn up in 1987. Following the highly stylized high school thriller Dangerously Close and the offbeat adventure film Down Twisted, Cannon wanted Pyun to make a more mainstream action movie. Pyun began development on two projects: a remake of Nicolas Ray's Johnny Guitar with John Travolta and a police/serial killer procedural thriller, then entitled Alex Rain after the main character.

When Cannon decided Travolta's commercial viability was too weak, they essentially killed the Johnny Guitar remake. Pyun shifted to Alex Rain and began developing the movie around actress Kelly Lynch as a deeply troubled FBI agent hunting a serial killer amongst the Neo-Nazi community. Pyun incorporated futuristic touches and set the film 25 years in the future; at one point he even considered setting it on Mars 400 years into the future. Thus began Pyun's interest in a cyberpunk setting.

When Cannon ran into financial trouble in October 1986, Pyun was asked to shelve Alex Rain temporarily and to focus instead on helping Cannon salvage its over-budget and incomplete adventure film Journey to the Center of the Earth. After this he focused on other projects, most notably the film Cyborg (1989).

Pyun returned to Alex Rain in 1991, after making the virtual reality film Arcade for Full Moon Entertainment. Pyun's research on that film gave him a number of ideas he wanted to incorporate into Alex Rain, including lowering the age of the protagonist to 13 and making Alex a tough, violent street urchin working undercover for a futuristic L.A.P.D. Having just worked with Megan Ward on Arcade, Pyun met with Ward and her agents to outline the film and discuss casting her as the lead. Ward and her agents responded favorably, despite reservations about the high level of violence and a scene which called for her character to be completely nude. Pyun shot a few test scenes with Ward and then began looking for a studio partner.

Pyun read an interview with Imperial Entertainment's production executive, Ash Shah, and realized he and Shah shared similar views about where low-budget action movies could go. Pyun met with the three Shah brothers and pitched them his ideas for the film and its possibilities. He left the screenplay with the Shah's and they called the next day to say they wanted to make the film. However, there was one condition: they wanted the lead changed from a 13-year-old girl to a 30-year-old male, so as to utilize their recent discovery, French kickboxer Olivier Gruner. At a long meeting at Imperial, both sides went back and forth until Imperial agreed that, other than the sex change, they would let Pyun make the movie he wanted to make no matter how unorthodox his methods. Pyun agreed to cast Gruner and pre-production began within days.

== Release ==
=== Home media ===
The company also released it on VHS and laserdisc the same year.

The film was released on DVD by Sterling Home Entertainment in 1998. This version is currently out of print.

In 2010, director Pyun announced his intention to re-release the film in a new, alternate cut that featured enhanced computer effects.

In 2014, German company Digidreams has released a complete set of the Nemesis film series. Fully remastered in High definition. The set includes Nemesis 1-4 transferred in 1080p Widescreen, Nemesis 1 CD Soundtrack, Director's Cut of Nemesis 1, Bonus features for all four films, and Audio Commentary by the Director. The set includes both German and English Audio 5.1/2.0 and is not region locked, and most of the bonus material is in English.

On 18 May 2015, 101 Films Ltd in the United Kingdom also released a complete set of the Nemesis film series on both Region 2 PAL DVD and Region B Blu-ray.

On January 8, 2019, MVD Visual released Nemesis on Blu-ray in the United States as part of their Rewind Collection. It is not region locked, and includes the 96 minute theatrical cut in HD (in a choice of aspect ratios, 2.35:1 or 1.78:1), the 88 minute “Nemesis 2.0” director’s cut in SD (2.35:1), and the 96 minute Japanese cut in SD (1.33:1), along with a selection of new and legacy special features including director commentary on the director’s cut, interviews with cast and crew, making-of featurettes, original theatrical trailer, TV spots, and more.

=== Alternate endings ===
The so-called Extended Version, released only in Japan and in the German Limited Edition BluRays, offers a darker ending. After Alex and Max's conversation about going to New York, Farnsworth appears as they walk up the stairs. A female voice (possibly Sam, whom Jared had previously referred to as the progenitor of the cyborg conspiracy) asks: "Should we take them out now?" Farnsworth turns to the off-screen woman and answers: "Why not?", suggesting that they succeed in the termination of Alex and Max.

This version does not contain the fight between Alex and Farnsworth's endoskeleton on the aerodyne, explaining his appearance here. There is also an extended scene with Germaine in his office at LAPD headquarters, asking the security staff if there has been a breach within security.

There is yet another alternate ending on some VOD platforms, where the fight with the endoskeleton does happen, and a voice over discussion between Farnsworth and an off-screen woman happens, but there is no visible cut to Farnsworth. It is followed by a thunderclap as the screen goes black and the credits roll.

== Reception ==
=== Box office ===
The film was given a limited release theatrically in the United States by Imperial Entertainment on 29 January 1993, grossing $2,001,124 at the box office.

=== Critical response ===
On the review aggregator Rotten Tomatoes the film holds a 71% score based on reviews from seven critics.

Kevin Thomas of the Los Angeles Times wrote the film's sometimes provocative ideas offset its convoluted plot and emphasis on action at the expense of exposition. Thomas also complimented the film's special effects.

== Sequels ==
The film spawned four sequels titled Nemesis 2: Nebula, set 73 years after the events of the first film, Nemesis 3: Prey Harder which features characters sent back in time to 1998, Nemesis 4: Death Angel and Nemesis 5: The New Model which was released 21 years after the last installment. Nemesis 3: Prey Harder was made using footage left over from the production of Nemesis 2: Nebula.

In 2017, Pyun took a back seat as Executive Producer on Nemesis 5: The New Model, directed by Dustin Ferguson, with Sue Price reprising her role alongside Mel Novak, Dawna Lee Heising and Schuylar Craig. Cyborg Nemesis: The Dark Rift, a crossover with his Cyborg film series, was also announced. Original Nemesis star Olivier Gruner is rumoured to feature.
