= Norbert Weisser =

German actor (born 1946)

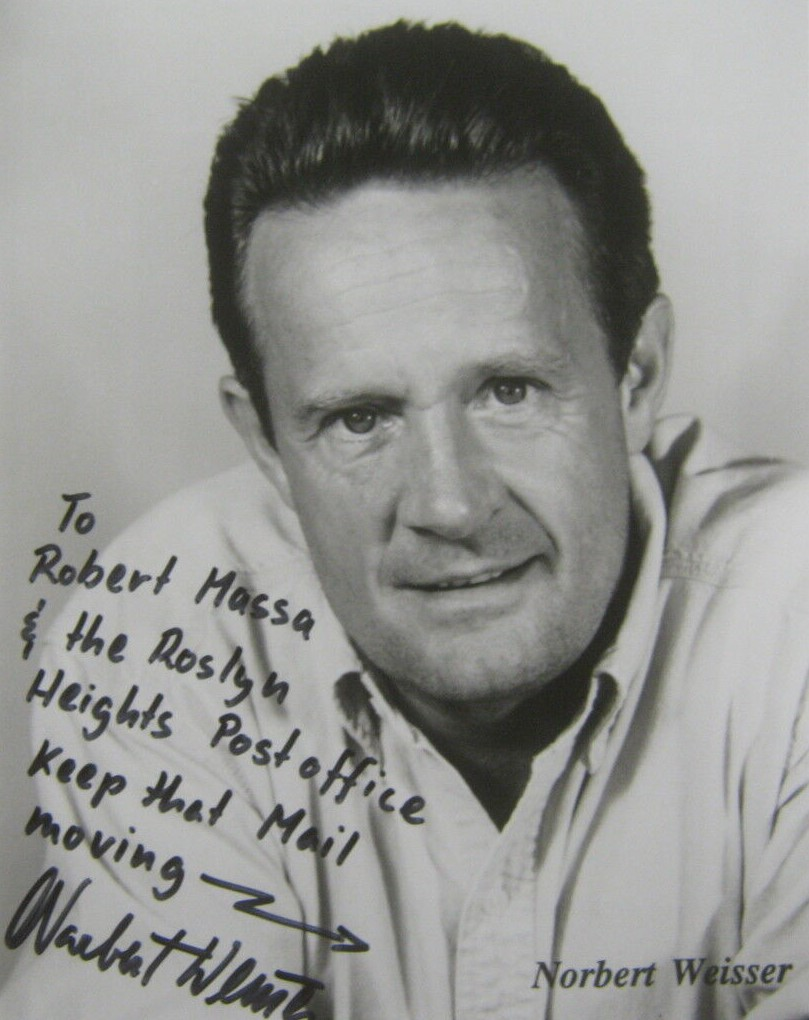
- Weisser c. 1990
- Born: 1946 (age 79–80); Germany
- Occupation: Actor
- Years active: 1968–present
- Spouse: Tandy
- Children: Morgan Weisser
- Website: norbertweisser.com

Norbert Weisser (born 1946) is a German actor who has been based in the United States since the mid-1960s.

== Career ==
Based in Los Angeles, Weisser is a founding member of Odyssey Theatre Ensemble, the ProVisional Theater, and the Padua Playwrights Festival. A long-time collaborator of Murray Mednick, he originated the role of the Trickester in the playwright's seven-hour Coyote Cycle, and has starred in numerous American and European theatrical productions, including opposite Ed Harris in Ronald Harwood's Taking Sides and John O'Keefe's Times Like These, where he received an Ovation Award, an LA Weekly Theater Award and an L.A. Drama Critics Circle Award nomination for his performance. He has also directed plays at the Magic Theatre in San Francisco and at the Mark Taper Forum.

Besides his extensive stage work, Weisser is also a prolific film and television actor, with over 90 credits to his name. Chiefly a character actor, he has starred in films including Midnight Express, The Thing, Chaplin, Hocus Pocus, Schindler's List, and Pollock, and numerous titles directed by Albert Pyun. He had a memorable guest role in "Madrigal" (a fifth season episode of Breaking Bad), reprised in Better Call Saul, and had provided voice-over and motion capture to a number of video games such as Medal of Honor: Allied Assault and Wolfenstein II: The New Colossus.

== Personal life ==
Weisser lives in Venice, Los Angeles, California, with his wife Tandy. His son Morgan Weisser is also an actor.

== Theatre credits ==
Year	Title	Role	Venue	Notes
1970–1972	The Threepenny Opera	Mac Heath	Odyssey Theater Ensemble	
1978	Julius Caesar	Decimus Brutus	The Matrix Theatre Company	
1982–1983	Mary Barnes	Eddie	Odyssey Theater Ensemble	
1983	Eminent Domain	Victor Salt	The Matrix Theatre Company	
1983	Black Hole in Space	David Reed	MET Theater	
1984–1985	The Coyote Cycle	The Trickster	Randall Davey Audubon Estate LA Theater Works	
1985	Three Sisters	Vershinin	Dallas Theater Center	
1993	The Ramp	Friederich	South Coast Repertory	
1996	Taking Sides	Helmuth Rode	Brooks Atkinson Theatre	
2000	The Coyote Cycle	The Trickster	Vineyard Playhouse	
2001	See Under: Love	Neigel	Traveling Jewish Theater	
2002	Times Like These	Oskar Weiss	Padua Playwrights	
2003	Danny Boy	Mr. Jones	Mark Taper Forum	
2004–2005	Times Like These	Oskar Weiss	Traveling Jewish Theater Capital Repertory Theatre	
2006	Clown Show for Bruno	Bruno Schulz	Irish Repertory Theatre (22nd Street)	
2007	Silent Partners	Hans Eisler	The Workmen's Circle	
2009	Charles' Story	Todd	Pacific Resident Theatre	
2010	The Fire Raisers	Gottlieb Biedermann	Odyssey Theater Ensemble	
2012	Way to Heaven	The Commandant	Odyssey Theater Ensemble	
2013	The Kepler Project	Johannes Kepler	Morrison Planetarium	
2016	The Gary Plays / Charles' Story	Todd	Atwater Village Theater	
2017	Krapp's Last Tape	Krapp	The Odyssey Theater	

== Filmography ==
=== Film ===
Year	Title	Role	Notes
1978	Midnight Express	Erich	
1980	Heaven's Gate	Linus	Uncredited
1982	The Thing	Norwegian	Dead body
1982	Android	Keller	
1983	Twilight Zone: The Movie	German Soldier	(segment "Time Out")
1984	City Limits	Bolo	
1985	Radioactive Dreams	Frank Sternwood	
1986	Three Amigos	German Thug	
1987	Down Twisted	Alsandro Deltoid	
1987	Walker	Jared Prange	
1988	Sweet Lies	Bill	
1988	From Hollywood to Deadwood	Peter Mueller	
1989	The Radicals	Michael Sattler	
1989	The Secret of the Ice Cave	Dr. Victor Talbot	
1990	Deceit	Bailey / Farnsworth III	
1990	Captain America	Alaskan Surveyor	
1990	Midnight Cabaret	Tony	
1991	The Rocketeer	Zeppelin Pilot	
1992	Chaplin	German Diplomat	
1993	Hocus Pocus	Mr. Binx	
1993	Arcade	Albert Kroll	
1993	Schindler's List	Unterscharführer Albert Hujar	
1994	The Road to Wellville	Dr. Spitzvogel	
1995	The Killers Within	Bernhard Hiller	
1996	Adrenalin: Fear the Rush	Cuzo	
1996	Nemesis 3: Prey Harder	Edson	
1996	Omega Doom	The Head	
1996	Nemesis 4: Death Angel	Tokuda	
1997	Blast	Lead Commando	
1997	Crazy Six	Jerzy	
1998	Sorcerers	Lord Manor	
1999	The Learning Curve	Usher	
2000	Pollock	Hans Namuth	
2001	Ticker	Billy Dugger	
2004	Around the Bend	Walter	
2005	Invasion	Dr. Franks	
2006	Cool Air	Deltoid	
2008	Road to Hell	Interrogator Farnsworth	
2009	Angels & Demons	Dr. Kozcinsky	
2010	Tales of an Ancient Empire	Xuxia	
2010	Being Killed	Geoffrey's Dad	
2014	One Weekend	Grandfather	
2019	She's in Portland	Rex	
2019	The Laundromat	Alwin Giordano	

=== Television ===
Year	Title	Role	Notes
1977	The Hardy Boys/Nancy Drew Mysteries	Gurt	2 episodes
1977	The Deadly Triangle	Ernst Haag	Television film
1977	McNamara's Band	Engineer	Television film
1978	Keefer	Vorst	Television film
1979	Barnaby Jones	Hans Mueller	Episode: "The Protectors"
1979	Lou Grant	Robert Bovic	Episode: "Bomb"
1979	Beggarman, Thief	Egon Hubisch	Television film
1982	The Greatest American Hero	Yuri Petchernec	Episode: "It's All Downhill from Here"
1982	Tales of the Gold Monkey	Hanus	2 episodes
1983	AfterMASH	Henry Smith	Episode: "Klinger vs. Klinger"
1984	Masquerade	Lohmann	Episode: "Sleeper"
1985	Stark	Powell	Television film
1985	Knight Rider	Fredo Lureni	Episode: "Knight Racer"
1986	Scarecrow and Mrs. King	German Officer In Play	Episode: "All the World's a Stage"
1986	Hunter	Craig Borson	Episode: "Change Partners and Dance"
1987	Spies	Werner	Episode: "Right or Rong"
1989	A Peaceable Kingdom	Rudy Farrell	Episode: "Reunion"
1990	The Incident	Riefenstahl	Television film
1991	Under Cover	Doctor	Episode: "War Game"
1991	Seeds of Tragedy	Gunter	Television film
1992	In the Line of Duty: Siege at Marion	John Singer	Television film
1992	Northern Exposure	Reinhart	Episode: "The Three Amigos"
1994	Amelia Earhart: The Final Flight	KLM Mechanic	Television film
1995	My Antonia	Otto	Television film
1995	Inseln unter dem Wind	Wagner	4 episodes
1996	Riders of the Purple Sage	Deacon Tull	Television film
1996	Und tschüss! In Amerika	Wagner	Television film
1996	Deutschlandlied	Lieutenant Chuccle	Miniseries
1997	Aaahh!!! Real Monsters	Farfegnuton	Voice, Episode: "Side by Side/Hooked on Phobics"
1998	From the Earth to the Moon	Dr. Wernher von Braun	Miniseries
1998	Brimstone	Martin Benedict	Episode: "Repentance"
2001	Alias	Jeroen Schiller	Episode: "Doppelgänger"
2002	The Agency	Konrad	Episode: "The Understudy"
2004	NCIS	Johannes Rutger	Episode: "Left for Death"
2004	ER	Dr. Adler	Episode: "Time of Death"
2006	Ghost Whisperer	Patrick Roth	Episode: "The Curse of the Ninth"
2008	Gemini Division	Albert Dresner	6 episodes
2012	Breaking Bad	Peter Schuler	Episode: "Madrigal"
2020	Better Call Saul	Peter Schuler	Episode: "JMM"

=== Video games ===
Year	Title	Role	Notes
2002	Medal of Honor: Allied Assault		Voice
2004	Call of Duty: Finest Hour		Voice
2014	Wolfenstein: The New Order	Enemy Soldier	Voice
2017	Wolfenstein II: The New Colossus	Adolf Hitler	Voice
