= Morgan Weisser =

American former actor

- Born: May 12, 1971 (age 53); Venice, California, U.S.
- Occupation: Actor
- Years active: 1984–2010
- Spouse: Allison Creelman (m. 2002)
- Father: Norbert Weisser

Morgan Weisser (born May 12, 1971) is an American former actor. He is best known for his role in the television series Space: Above and Beyond (1995–1996).

== Filmography ==
=== Film ===
Year	Title	Role	Notes
1985	City Limits	Young Mick	
1990	Prayer of the Rollerboys	Bullwinkle	
1994	Shortcut to Paradise	Gus	
1995	Mother	Tom Hendrix	Direct-to-video
2000	Dave's Blind Date	Husband	Short
2005	Infection	Timmy Boswell	
2006	Cool Air	Charles Baxter	Direct-to-video
2010	Bulletface	Josh Wexler	
2010	Tales of an Ancient Empire	Captain Avel	

=== Television ===
Year	Title	Role	Notes
1990	Extreme Close-Up	David Toll	Television film
1990	China Beach	Everett Jr.	Episode: "One Giant Leap"
1991	Long Road Home	Jake Robertson	Television film
1992	Stay the Night	Michael Kettman Jr.	Television film
1992	Quantum Leap	Tim Stoddard	Episode: "Star Light, Star Bright - May 21, 1966"
1993	Crime & Punishment		Episode: "Our Denial"
1993	Law & Order	Leon Iliescu	Episode: "Securitate"
1994	A Burning Passion: The Margaret Mitchell Story	Clifford	Television film
1995–1996	Space: Above and Beyond	1st Lt. Nathan West	Main cast, 23 episodes
1996	The X-Files	Lee Harvey Oswald	Episode: "Musings of a Cigarette Smoking Man"
1999	Nash Bridges	John Temple	Episode: "Truth & Consequences"
2000	Charmed	Vinceres	Episode: "Primrose Empath"
2001	The Beast	Brandon Roomer	Episode: "Functional Family"
2004	The Division	Randy Marks	Episode: "Bite Me"
2004	Alias	Cypher	Episode: "Unveiled"
2004	American Family	Dr. Peters	5 episodes
2004	Murder Without Conviction	Det. Jack Brooks	Television film
2005	NCIS	Vincent Hanlan	Episode: "The Meat Puzzle"

== Awards and nominations ==
Year	Award	Category	Nominated work	Result	Ref.
1991	12th Youth in Film Awards	Best Young Actor Starring in a TV Movie, Pilot or Special	Extreme Close-Up	Nominated	
