= Victoria Maurette =

Victoria Maurette (Vicko)
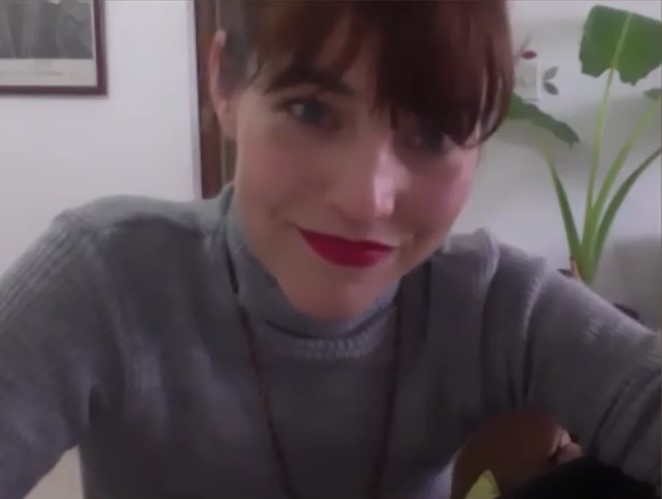
- Maurette in 2020

Background information
- Born: Victoria Maurette; July 30, 1982 (age 43); Buenos Aires, Argentina
- Genres: Pop rock, Alternative rock, pop, Latin pop
- Occupation(s): Actress, singer, musician, composer, songwriter
- Instrument(s): Vocals, guitar
- Years active: 2001–present
- Labels: Sony BMG (2002–05)

Victoria Maurette, also known by her pseudonym Vicko (born July 30, 1982), is an Argentine actress, musician, singer, songwriter and composer. She is probably best known for her performance as Victoria "Vico" Paz in the Cris Morena Group series Rebelde Way, and for her roles in Albert Pyun's films Left for Dead, Bulletface and Tales of an Ancient Empire.

== Early life and career ==
Victoria Maurette (Vicko) was born on July 30, 1982, in Buenos Aires, Argentina, to French parents. A few months later she moved with her family to the United States. Years later they moved to Ecuador, first, and then Mexico. Finally, in 1994, they moved back to Argentina where Victoria graduated in Asociaciones Escuelas Lincoln; soon after she began her career as an artist. While in school, Maurette was a member of drama club and sang in the choir.

== Acting career ==
In 2001, Maurette signed her first professional contract for the musical Disney Magical Moments. After that some producers spotted her and called her to audition for a television show. Maurette debuted on television in 2002, as Victoria "Vico Paz on teenage soap opera Rebelde Way, created by Cris Morena. Maurette co—starred Camila Bordonaba, Felipe Colombo, Luisana Lopilato and Benjamín Rojas, who formed the pop rock band Erreway. Maurette sang back vocals and danced at the concerts of two Erreway's tours, Erreway en Grand Rex and Nuestro Tiempo. She also has one solo line in Erreway's song "Bonita de Más", and appeared in few of their videos. At the Nuesrto Tiempo tour, she sang her solo song "No soy asi".

In 2004, Maurette appeared in soap opera No hay 2 sin 3, and then turned to her film career. In 2007, she filmed her first film in English, thriller Bulletface, portraying Dara Maren. Maurette was then seen in two horror films, Left for Dead (2007) and Dying God (2008). She was the leading star of both films, co-starred by her Rebelde Way co-star Mariana Seligmann. Maurette will star in 2009 film Kung Fu Joe. She stars in the Albert Pyun film Bulletface on the side from Steven Bauer and stars in another Pyun thriller film Tales of Ancient Empire.

== Music career ==
Before graduating, Maurette already sang in bars and night clubs. In 2001, she signed her first professional contract for the musical Disney Magical Moments. In 2002, she co-starred the Erreway members (Camila Bordonaba, Felipe Colombo, Luisana Lopilato and Benjamín Rojas) on the Cris Morena's television series Rebelde Way. Maurette was included as a back vocalist in few songs of Erreway ("Bonita de Más", "Resistiré" and "Rebelde Way") and also appeared in many videos of them; she also performed at their tours Erreway en Grand Rex and Nuestro Tiempo. At the 2003 Nuestro Tiempo tour, Maurette sang her solo song "No soy asi".

After portraying in 2004 television series There Is No 2 Without 3, Maurette dedicated her time to study music, perfect her singing and compose first songs. In 2005, she recorder her first solo album Paso a paso, which was not released. The singles from the album — "Si solo supieras", "Buenas noches", "Sin quierer" and "Aunque" — were included on her first solo album, Victoria, released in 2009. The album features ten pop rock songs inspired by Alanis Morissette, Fiona Apple and Sheryl Crow. Maurette released her album independently.

== Personal life ==
Maurette is fluent in Spanish and English. From 2002 to 2004, she dated her Rebel's Way fellow Piru Sáez. On November 11, 2010, Maurette married Esteban Young. Many of her former co–stars, including Felipe Colombo, Benjamín Rojas, Coco Maggio, Micaela Vázquez and Soledad Fandiño, attended the wedding. On August 15, 2012, their daughter Emma Young was born. The couple divorced in 2018.

== Filmography ==
Title	Year	Role	Notes
Rebelde Way	2002	Victoria "Vico" Paz	(TV; 2002–03) Rebelde Way
There Is No 2 Without 3	2004	Various characters	No hay 2 sin 3
Left for Dead	2007	Clementine Templeton	Buenos Aires Rojo Sangre Award for Best Actress
Dying God	2008	Ingrid	
Kung Fu Joe	2009	Femme Fatale	
The Angels	2009	Lena	Los ángeles
Bulletface	2010	Dara Marren	
Tales of an Ancient Empire	2010	Kara	
Jake & Blake	2010	Miranda	(TV; 2010–11)
The Theatre Bizarre	2011	Karina	
Run Coyote Run	2018	Jennifer	TV series

== Stage credits ==
Title	Year	Role	Production notes
Disney Magical Moments	2001	Victoria	Grand Rex Theatre

== Discography ==
=== Album ===
- 2009: Victoria

=== Singles ===
- 2003: "No soy asi"
- 2005: "Si Solo Supieras"
- 2005: "Buenas Noches"
- 2005: "Sin Querer"
- 2006: "Anque"

== Awards and nominations ==
Award	Year	Category	Nominated work	Result
Buenos Aires Rojo Sangre	2007	Best Actress	Left for Dead	Won
