= Bulletface =

- Theatrical release poster
- Directed by: Albert Pyun
- Written by: Randall Fontana
- Produced by: Joe Baile; Nelson Carpentier; Rob Ladesich; Sazzy Lee Calhoun; Michael Najjar; Gary Schmoeller
- Starring: Victoria Maurette; Steven Bauer; Morgan Weisser; Jenny Dare Paulin; Eddie Velez; Scott Paulin
- Cinematography: Jim Hagopian; Michael Kutcher
- Edited by: Ken Morrisey
- Music by: Anthony Riparetti
- Production companies: SP Inc. Sofia Films
- Distributed by: Curnan Motion Picture Services
- Release date: January 26, 2010
- Running time: 82 minutes
- Country: United States
- Language: English

Bulletface is a 2010 American action thriller film directed by Albert Pyun. The screenplay was written by Randall Fontana, who had previously collaborated with Pyun on Hong Kong '97.

== Synopsis ==
Dara Maren is a DEA agent who gets dragged into the seedy underworld of California/Mexico border smuggling in an attempt to protect her younger brother. During a drug deal gone bad, she ends up shooting and killing an undercover ATF agent and is arrested. She's convicted and incarcerated inside a penal colony just outside Tijuana, where the prison officials harvest organs from the inmates. During her incarceration, Dara's brother is murdered by a drug lord who's also using human spinal fluid drained from his victims to create a new DNA-altering drug that turns those who become addicted to it into something not human. As hundreds of dead bodies start turning up along the Mexico border, and with law enforcement and government officials falling victim to its addictive properties as well, an old friend from the FBI manages to bribe the officials in Tijuana to let Dara back out onto the streets in order to bring down the drug lord and avenge her brother's murder.

== Cast ==
- Victoria Maurette as Dara Marren
- Steven Bauer as Ned Walker
- Morgan Weisser as Josh Wexler
- Jenny Dare Paulin as Shannon Dall
- Eddie Velez as Eric Muller
- Scott Paulin as Brendon Wexler
- Francia Almendárez as Maria
- Michael Esparza as Bruno Maren
- Jeremy Parrish as Marco Muller / Robert Muller
- Assaf Cohen as Amir

== Awards ==
2006 Northwest Independent Film Festival:

• Best Experimental Film

2012 Pollygrind Underground Film Festival

- Best Crime Film

- Bad Girl Award

- Victoria Maurette

- Best Sound Design

- Tony Riparetti
