= Scott Paulin =

American actor and director (born 1950)

- Born: Robert Scott Paulin; February 13, 1950 (age 76); Steubenville, Ohio, U.S.
- Education: Pomona College (BA)
- Occupations: Actor, director
- Years active: 1977 – present
- Spouse: Wendy Phillips (m. 1981)

Robert Scott Paulin (born February 13, 1950) is an American actor and director.

He is known for playing Deke Slayton in the film The Right Stuff (1983). He has also acted in films including Cat People (1982), Teen Wolf (1985), The Accused (1988), Turner & Hooch (1989), and I Am Sam (2001). He also portrayed Red Skull in Captain America (1990).

== Early life and education ==
Born and raised in Steubenville, Ohio, Paulin attended Steubenville High School. He earned a Bachelor of Arts degree in political science from Pomona College in 1971. He later attended Ohio State University and studied theatre and music.

== Career ==
=== Acting ===
Paulin first guest starred on several television series during the late-1970s and early-1980s, including two episodes of St. Elsewhere in 1981. He gained notice appearing in the 1979 television film Vampire. He got his big break in 1983, with a supporting role in the space film The Right Stuff, for which he played astronaut Deke Slayton.

Later on, he appeared in other films, includingTeen Wolf (1985), The Accused (1988), Turner and Hooch (1989), Pump Up the Volume (1990) and I Am Sam (2001). He also voiced Jasper T. Jowls from Chuck E. Cheese from 1977 to 1985. He has since appeared in over 100 productions.

== Personal life ==
Since 1981, Paulin has been married to Wendy Phillips. The couple has one child, a daughter.

== Filmography ==
=== Film ===
Year	Title	Role	Notes
1980	Serial	Jon	
1982	Cat People	Bill Searle	
1982	Forbidden World	Earl Richards	
1983	The Right Stuff	Deke Slayton	
1983	The Christmas That Almost Wasn't	Jasper T. Jowls	Video short
1984	A Soldier's Story	Captain Wilcox	
1984	California Without End	Robert	
1985	Warning Sign	Captain Walston	
1985	Teen Wolf	Kirk Lolley	
1986	The Last of Philip Banter	Philip Banter	
1988	From Hollywood to Deadwood	Raymond Savage	
1988	The Accused	Attorney Wainwright	
1989	Turner & Hooch	Zack Gregory	
1990	Deceit	Brick Bardo	
1990	Pump Up the Volume	Brian Hunter	
1990	Grim Prairie Tales	Martin	
1990	Captain America	Red Skull / Army Doctor	
1993	Knights	Simon	
2001	I Am Sam	Duncan Rhodes	
2003	The Extreme Team	Coach	
2005	Infection	Officer Brick Bardo	
2006	The Heart Specialist	Dr. Graves	
2007	Jane Doe: How to Fire Your Boss	Phil Sands	
2008	Road to Hell	Driver Brick Bardo	
2009	The Intervention	Priest	
2010	Bulletface	Brendon Wexler	
2010	Tales of an Ancient Empire	Tou-Bou Bardo	

=== Television ===
Year	Title	Role	Notes
1979	Vampire	Priest	Television film
1981	The Killing of Randy Webster	Tom Curtis	Television film
1982–1986	Hill Street Blues	Steve Merkur / Cleary	3 episodes
1983–1985	St. Elsewhere	Stephen Craig	4 episodes
1984	The Sheriff and the Astronaut	Robert Malfi	Television film
1984	Fatal Vision	William Ivory	2 episodes
1985	Deadly Messages	Dr. Roger Kelton	Television film
1985	Generation	Graff	Television film
1985	Midas Valley	Seth	Television film
1985	On Our Way	Matthew	Television film
1985	Amazing Stories	Fenton Globe	Episode: "Ghost Train"
1985	The Twilight Zone	Price	Episode: "Nightcrawlers"
1986	Stingray	Prof. Brainard	Episode: "Abnormal Psych"
1986	When the Bough Breaks	Rick	Television film
1986	Dreams of Gold: The Mel Fisher Story	Don Kincaid	Television film
1986	A Year in the Life	Glenn Maxwell	4 episodes
1987	Police Story: The Freeway Killings	Lt. Todd Banyon	Television film
1987	Moonlighting	Robert Murphy	Episode: "To Heiress Human"
1987	Murder, She Wrote	Dr. Marshall	Episode: "Old Habits Die Hard"
1988	Weekend War	Rudd	Television film
1988	Friday the 13th: The Series	Reverend Josiah Grange	2 episodes
1988	To Heal a Nation	Bob Doubek	Television film
1988	Desert Rats	Bones	Television film
1988	Tricks of the Trade	Frank	Television film
1988, 1993	L.A. Law	Ben Salter / Alex Jennings	2 episodes
1989	Desperate for Love	Merl Becker	Television film
1989	Capone Behind Bars	Eliot Ness	Television film
1990	Falcon Crest	Joey Walts	Episode: "Brotherly Love"
1990	Appearances	Ben Danzig	Television film
1990	American Dreamer	Larry	Episode: "Mr. Wizard"
1991	The Perfect Tribute	Willis	Television film
1991	White Hot: The Mysterious Murder of Thelma Todd	Louis Marsden	Television film
1991	Deadly Medicine	Charleigh Holland	Television film
1991–1993	I'll Fly Away	Tucker Anderson	11 episodes
1992	Civil Wars	Donald Riordan	Episode: "The Naked and the Wed"
1992	Human Target	Jay Palmer	2 episodes
1993	Northern Exposure	Lance Bristol	Episode: "Northern Lights"
1993	Full Eclipse	Teague	Television film
1993	Nick's Game	Harley Stock	Television film
1993–1996	Beverly Hills, 90210	Professor Corey Randall	8 episodes
1994	MacShayne: The Final Roll of the Dice	Albert Blondel	Television film
1994	Hotel Malibu	George Bennett	6 episodes
1994	Gambler V: Playing for Keeps	Butch Cassidy	Television film
1995	Kansas	Tom	Television film
1996	Profit	Jack Walters	2 episodes
1996	Sweet Dreams	Richard Mateo	Television film
1997	Cloned	John Gryce	Television film
1997	Chicago Hope	Dr. Daniel Suffin	1 episode
1997	Promised Land	Dan Hoaglund	Episode: "St. Russell"
1999	My Little Assassin	Stewart Allen	Television film
2001	Diagnosis: Murder	Robert B. Stafford	Episode: "Dance of Danger"
2001	The Beast	Agent Miller	Episode: "The Price"
2001	Just Ask My Children	Kevin Conway	Television film
2001	Alias	Robert Stoller	Episode: "Spirit"
2002	The X-Files	Jeffrey Conlon	Episode: "Scary Monsters"
2002	For the People	Danny Franklin	Episode: "Pilot"
2002–2003	JAG	Captain Johnson	7 episodes
2003	Without a Trace	Lawrence Metcalf	Episode: "Clare de Lune"
2003	24	Brian Jacobs	2 episodes
2003	Threat Matrix	Tom Shelby	Episode: "Under the Gun"
2003	Line of Fire	FBI Director Mills	Episode: "Boom, Swagger, Boom"
2003	The Lyon's Den	Carl Spencer	Episode: "Privileged"
2004	The Division	Tom Ringston	Episode: "As I Was Going to St. Ives..."
2004	Lost	Sullivan	Episode: "Solitary"
2005	CSI: Crime Scene Investigation	Dr. Malcolm Parker	Episode: "Gum Drops"
2006	Ghost Whisperer	Alan Rowe	Episode: "Last Execution"
2006	Boston Legal	U.S. Attorney Jonathan Shapiro	Episode: "Stick It"
2006	NCIS	Captain Kevin Dorn	Episode: "Untouchable"
2007	Final Approach	Robert Windom	Television film
2007	Shark	Craig Deering	Episode: "Student Body"
2008	Cold Case	Kenneth Yates	Episode: "True Calling"
2008	House	Bob	Episode: "Birthmarks"
2009	Lie to Me	Gerald Cole	Episode: "Pilot"
2009	ER	Dr. Kirsch	Episode: "I Feel Good"
2009–2014	Castle	Jim Beckett	9 episodes
2011	NCIS: Los Angeles	Larry Basser	Episode: "Lone Wolf"
2012	Longmire	Ira Craig	Episode: "The Worst Kind of Hunter"
2012	Perception	Senator Ted Paulson	Episode: "Light"
2014	The Young and the Restless	Dr. Ed Botnik	4 episodes

== See also ==
- List of American actors
- List of people from Ohio
