= Deceit (1990 film) =

- Directed by: Albert Pyun
- Written by: Kitty Chalmers
- Produced by: Tom Karnowski
- Starring: Sam Phillips; Norbert Weisser; Scott Paulin; Diane Defoe; Christian Andrews
- Cinematography: Philip Alan Waters
- Edited by: Sydney Conrad
- Music by: Anthony Riparetti; Jim Saad
- Distributed by: 21st Century Film Corporation
- Release date: October 1990 (Germany)
- Running time: 92 minutes
- Country: United States
- Language: English
- Budget: $22,000
- Box office: $2 million

Deceit is a 1990 minimalist science fiction film. Some sources cite a 1992 or a 1993 release date.

== Plot ==
An unknown man commits suicide by drinking bleach. After his death, his body is then possessed, and he claims his name to be an alien sex fiend named Bailey. About a month later, a group, including Wilma (Diane Defoe), on their way to Las Vegas for a wedding stop to pick up Bailey who claims his car has broken down.

Bailey (Norbert Weisser) now claims to be an alien who destroys polluted worlds. He shoots the others in the car and kidnaps Eve (Samantha Phillips) deciding to postpone his plans to destroy Earth until they are able to have sexual relations.

Eve thinks Bailey may be an escaped mental patient, and this seems likely when Bailey's "therapist" Brick (Scott Paulin) shows up, but he also claims to be an alien sent to Earth to destroy all humans and cleanse the planet.

Both Brick and Bailey attempt to seduce Eve, but are unsuccessful. Just before the Earth is destroyed, an intergalactic police officer, now possessing Wilma, uses a powerful object (The Cube) to grant the Earthlings a stay of execution. Eve shoots Bailey and Brick. The fate of the world now rests in Eve's hands.

== Production ==
The entire film was shot in three days. Written and directed by Albert Pyun, the film has no special effects other than a single cube and was mostly filmed on one set. Pyun said he filmed the movie this way as he enjoys avant garde film making.

The film was shot during Cyborg additional photography and Pyun used the same crew and locations.

== Cast ==
- Norbert Weisser as Bailey
- Christian Andrews as Niram
- Diane Defoe as Wilma
- Samantha Phillips as Eve
- Scott Paulin as "Brick"

== Reception ==
Creature Feature gave the movie two out of five stars. Moria found the film "awful" Rivets on a poster was much kinder to the film, finding it a "beautiful and intelligent midnight movie, which is good enough – and funny enough – to make you forget its flaws." TV Guide gave the movie one star, finding it overlong and thinly plotted, and the attempts at parody strained.
