= Ticker (2001 film) =

2001 film by Albert Pyun

- Theatrical release poster
- Directed by: Albert Pyun
- Written by: Paul B. Margolis
- Produced by: Ken Aguado; Randall Emmett; George Furla; Albert Pyun; Paul Rosenblum
- Starring: Tom Sizemore; Dennis Hopper; Steven Seagal; Ice-T; Kevin Gage; Jaime Pressly; Nas
- Cinematography: Philip Alan Waters
- Edited by: Cari Coughlin; Ken Morrisey
- Music by: Serge Colbert
- Production companies: Nu Image Films; Filmwerks; Kings Road Entertainment; Emmett/Furla Films
- Distributed by: Artisan Entertainment
- Release date: November 13, 2001
- Running time: 92 minutes
- Country: United States
- Language: English
- Budget: $10-15 million

Ticker is a 2001 American action film directed by Albert Pyun and starring Tom Sizemore, Jaime Pressly, Dennis Hopper, Steven Seagal, Ice-T, Kevin Gage, and Nas.

== Plot ==
A SWAT team converges on the house of a United States Senator, who is being held hostage. The bomb squad arrives; Frank Glass (Steven Seagal) finds a bomb in the basement and works to disarm it while the SWAT team is in a shootout with the hostage takers. Glass disarms the bomb but deems it too easy, believing it was designed to mislead him. The real bomb detonates, killing everyone inside.

A year later in San Francisco, narcotics cops Ray Nettles (Tom Sizemore) and partner Art "Fuzzy" Rice (Nas) arrest a suspect on drug charges. Ray lets a woman go who pleads for her and her child; Fuzzy tells Ray to get some help for his "demons" - he has never mourned the car bombing death of his wife and son. They see people entering a warehouse late at night and investigate. Ray apprehends a woman and three men converge on him; Fuzzy is shot by their leader (Dennis Hopper) and the three men flee. Ray arrests the woman, Claire (Jaime Pressly), but she refuses to say anything about the men. She is wearing an odd-looking bracelet which Nettles takes to the bomb squad for Glass to look over. The bracelet is found to contain detonation cord and Semtex explosive. The leader tells the police they have one hour to release Claire; when they do not, he bombs a bar.

Ray takes Glass back to the warehouse where they find a French cigarette and matchbook from a jazz club. They go to the club and kill one of the bombers, disarming his bomb. Ray questions Claire again; she reveals the bomber's names - Alex Swan, the leader, and Vershbow, the surviving member. She claims that no matter what happens, she will be killed for getting caught, and has decided to cooperate. Swan intends to plant a bomb at the police station, but Vershbow gets cold feet and forces Swan to give him the bomb at gunpoint. The police corner him and Glass apparently prevents the detonation, but Swan detonates several more bombs using a pay phone.

Swan arranges a massive bombing with a crew led by Vincent Cruichshank (Ice-T). Ray convinces the police to release Claire, hoping to avert another bombing, and they give her a tracking device. Once she meets up with Swan, however, she disables the tracker and works with him. They discuss their upcoming "masterpiece," and Claire goes to a phone booth to activate the bomb. She detonates a car bomb in Swan's car, instead. Confused, Glass tells Ray they must both be dead. Seeing City Hall on TV, Ray remembers Claire's story about her husband and realizes she was the mastermind all along. They rush to City Hall and split up - Ray goes to the basement and Glass to the roof. Ray is forced to disarm a bomb with advice over the radio from Glass, who coaches him to relax and forget his grief, but the device is a decoy. Glass disarms the real bomb on the roof.

== Cast ==
- Tom Sizemore as Detective Ray Nettles
- Steven Seagal as Lieutenant Frank Glass, Demolitions Expert and Bomb Squad Chief
- Dennis Hopper as Alex Swan, Irish Terrorist
- Nas as Detective Art "Fuzzy" Rice
- Jaime Pressly as Claire Manning
- Kevin Gage as Payton "Pooch" Stad, Bomb Squad Expert
- Romany Malco as T.J. Littles, Bomb Squad Expert
- Mimi Rose as Beverly "Bev" Seabo, Bomb Squad Secretary
- Peter Greene as Detective Artie Pluchinsky
- Ice-T as Vincent Cruichshank, Terrorist Commander
- Rozonda "Chilli" Thomas as Lilly McCutcheon
- Michael Halsey as Simon Vershbow, Swan's Assistant
- Norbert Weisser as Billy Dugger, Swan's Assistant
- Joe Spano as Captain R.J. Winters
- Milos Milicevic as Milos Markovic, Balkan Terrorist At Governor's Mansion
- Jenny McShane as Nettles' Wife
- Joey Meyer Rosenblum as Pooch's Son

== Production ==
In May 2000, it was reported that Artisan Entertainment had entered into a pact with Nu Image for domestic distribution of Ticker, an action thriller starring Steven Seagal to be directed by Albert Pyun. Emmett/Furla Oasis backed the film under their Family Room Entertainment Banner with Tom Sizemore having come aboard to co-star in the film. Dennis Hopper was announced to have joined the film the following month.

=== Post-production ===
During post-production, Nu-Image dictated many changes that Pyun denounced as "Horrible" particularly the removal of character building scenes for Seagal as according to Pyun Nu-Image just wanted him fighting against both Pyun and Seagal's wishes. Pyun's director's cut would later be posted to Vimeo under the title of “TICKER” Anti-Studio Director’s Cut, but the link is now dead.

== Release ==
Ticker was given a straight-to-video release in the United States on November 13, 2001.
