= Crazy Six =

1998 film directed by Albert Pyun

- Directed by: Albert Pyun
- Written by: Galen Yuen
- Produced by: Tom Karnowski; Gary Schmoeller
- Starring: Rob Lowe; Mario Van Peebles; Ice-T; Burt Reynolds
- Cinematography: George Mooradian
- Edited by: Natasha Gjurokovic
- Music by: Anthony Riparetti
- Production company: Filmwerks; Imperial Entertainment; Weapon of Choice Inc.
- Distributed by: Sterling Entertainment Group (US)
- Release date: July 28, 1998 (USA)
- Running time: 94 minutes
- Country: United States
- Language: English

Crazy Six is a 1998 American gangster film directed by Albert Pyun and starring Rob Lowe, Mario Van Peebles, Ice-T, Ivana Miličević and Burt Reynolds. It was released direct-to-video in the United States on July 29, 1998.

== Plot ==
A decade after the fall of communism, a section of Eastern Europe known as "Crimeland" becomes a trade route for drugs and weapons. Billie "Crazy Six" and his friends rob a plutonium deal involving Raul to obtain money for their drug habits with the aid of "Dirty" Mao, who cheats them out of the money in the end. Raul is given 48 hours by his boss to recover the goods and begins by hunting them down at a local club, injuring the singer Anna and killing Andrew's girlfriend Viyana.

The American detective Dakota interviews Anna, leading him to Billie. Anna is kidnapped by Raul's men and forced to smoke crack. Billie and Andrew rob "Dirty" Mao's hideout and recover the money. Dakota follows them to the exchange with Raul, but so does "Dirty" Mao. After a gunfight between Dakota and Raul's men, "Dirty" Mao kills Raul and attempts to frame Billie for it but is shot and killed by Dakota.

In the end, Dakota adopts "Dirty" Mao's dog, Anna returns to singing, and Billie gets clean.

== Cast ==
- Rob Lowe as Billie "Crazy Six"
- Mario Van Peebles as "Dirty" Mao
- Ice-T as Raul
- Burt Reynolds as Dakota
- Ivana Milicevic as Anna
- Thom Matthews as Andrew
- Blanka Kleinova as Viyana
- Norbert Weisser as Jerzy
- Donald Standen as Avi
- Max Van Peebles as Michelle
- Thomas Morris as Yusovic
- Dagmar Edwards as Jackie
- Vladimir Furdik as Stefan
- Marko Igonda as Medina

== Production ==
The screenplay originally took place in San Francisco, but was rewritten after the production moved to Slovakia to save money. Crazy Six was the only feature film written by Galen Yuen, a former gang member-turned-character actor. On the podcast Magnificent Jerk, Yuen's niece and Washington Post reporter Maya Lin Sugarman attests that the film was at least partially autobiographical.

== Release ==
The film was released direct-to-video in the United States on July 28, 1998.

== Reception ==
Nathan Rabin of The A.V. Club wrote that "Lowe is predictably awful" yet "despite Lowe's performance, Crazy Six is palatable, with Pyun giving the film an appropriately seedy aura of glamorous decay."
