= Knights (film) =

- Official VHS cover
- Directed by: Albert Pyun
- Written by: Albert Pyun
- Produced by: Tom Karnowski
- Starring: Kathy Long; Kris Kristofferson
- Cinematography: George Mooradian
- Edited by: Dean Goodhill
- Music by: Tony Riparetti
- Production companies: Kings Road Entertainment; Moonstone Entertainment
- Distributed by: Paramount Home Video
- Release date: November 17, 1993
- Running time: 90 minutes
- Country: United States
- Language: English

Knights is a 1993 American martial arts science fiction action film directed by Albert Pyun and starring kickboxing champion Kathy Long in her Hollywood debut. The film was released direct to home video in 1993.

== Plot ==
The cyborg Gabriel (Kris Kristofferson) was created to destroy all other cyborgs. He later rescues Nea (Kathy Long) by killing the cyborg Simon (Scott Paulin). Gabriel trains Nea to become a cyborg killer and help him. They continue to kill cyborgs until Gabriel is torn in half by one of his targets and taken to the cyborg camp. Nea follows Jacob and challenges the cyborg leader Job (Lance Henriksen) to a fight. Finding Gabriel, she straps him to her back and they battle cyborgs until Gabriel can attach a dead cyborg's legs to himself. They pursue Job, but before they can catch him, the Master Builder captures Nea's brother, taking him to Cyborg City. During a battle, Job tells Gabriel that the cyborg population can't be stopped. Job dies moments later. Gabriel and Nea ride off in search of her brother.

== Cast ==
- Kathy Long as Nea
  - Casey Wallace as Young Nea
- Kris Kristofferson as Gabriel The Cyborg
- Lance Henriksen as Job The Cyborg
- Scott Paulin as Simon The Cyborg
- Gary Daniels as David The Cyborg
- Nicholas Guest as Farmer
- Vincent Klyn as Ty (credited as Vince Klyn)
- Ben McCreary as Chance
- Jon H. Epstein as Matthew
- Blair Valk as Blu
- Brad Langenberg as Master Builder
- Clare Hoak as Mother
- Nancy Thurston as Woman Bandit
- Michael Halsey as Farmer Sitting At Campfire (uncredited)
- Tim Thomerson as Farmer Sitting At Campfire (uncredited)

== Production ==
=== Filming ===
Parts of the film were shot in Utah at Monument Valley, the La Sal Mountains, Needles Overlook, Long Canyon, Professor Valley and a mushroom rock at Pucker Pass.
