= Down Twisted =

1987 film

- Theatrical release poster
- Directed by: Albert Pyun
- Written by: Gene O'Neill; Albert Pyun; Noreen Tobin
- Produced by: Yoram Globus; Menahem Golan
- Starring: Carey Lowell; Charles Rocket; Trudi Dochterman; Norbert Weisser; Linda Kerridge; Nicholas Guest; Thom Mathews; Courteney Cox; Galyn Görg
- Cinematography: Walt Lloyd
- Edited by: Dennis M. O'Connor
- Music by: Eric Allaman; Reinhard Scheuregger
- Distributed by: The Cannon Group; Norstar Releasing; Golan-Globus Productions
- Release date: March 16, 1987
- Running time: 88 minutes
- Country: United States
- Language: English

Down Twisted is a 1987 thriller film, directed by Albert Pyun, and starring Carey Lowell, Charles Rocket, Courteney Cox, Norbert Weisser, Linda Kerridge, Trudi Dochtermann and Nicholas Guest.

== Plot ==
A naïve, good-hearted waitress working in Los Angeles helps her roommate without thinking. Her help lands her in Central America fleeing for her life with a grungy mercenary.

== Cast ==
- Carey Lowell as Maxine
- Charles Rocket as Reno
- Trudi Dochtermann as Michelle
- Thom Mathews as Damalas
- Norbert Weisser as Alsandro Deltoid
- Linda Kerridge as Soames
- Nicholas Guest as Brady
- Galyn Gorg as Blake
- Courteney Cox as Tarah
- Bambi Jordan as Suzie
- Ken Wright as Mr. Wicks
- Alec Markham as Captain
- Eduardo Cassab as Sargento
- Christabel Wigley as Theona
- Tim Holland as Mickey

== Release ==
The film was given a limited theatrical release in March 1987. The home video release was in the United States in 1990 by Media Home Entertainment.
