= Melissa Ordway =

American actress (born 1983)

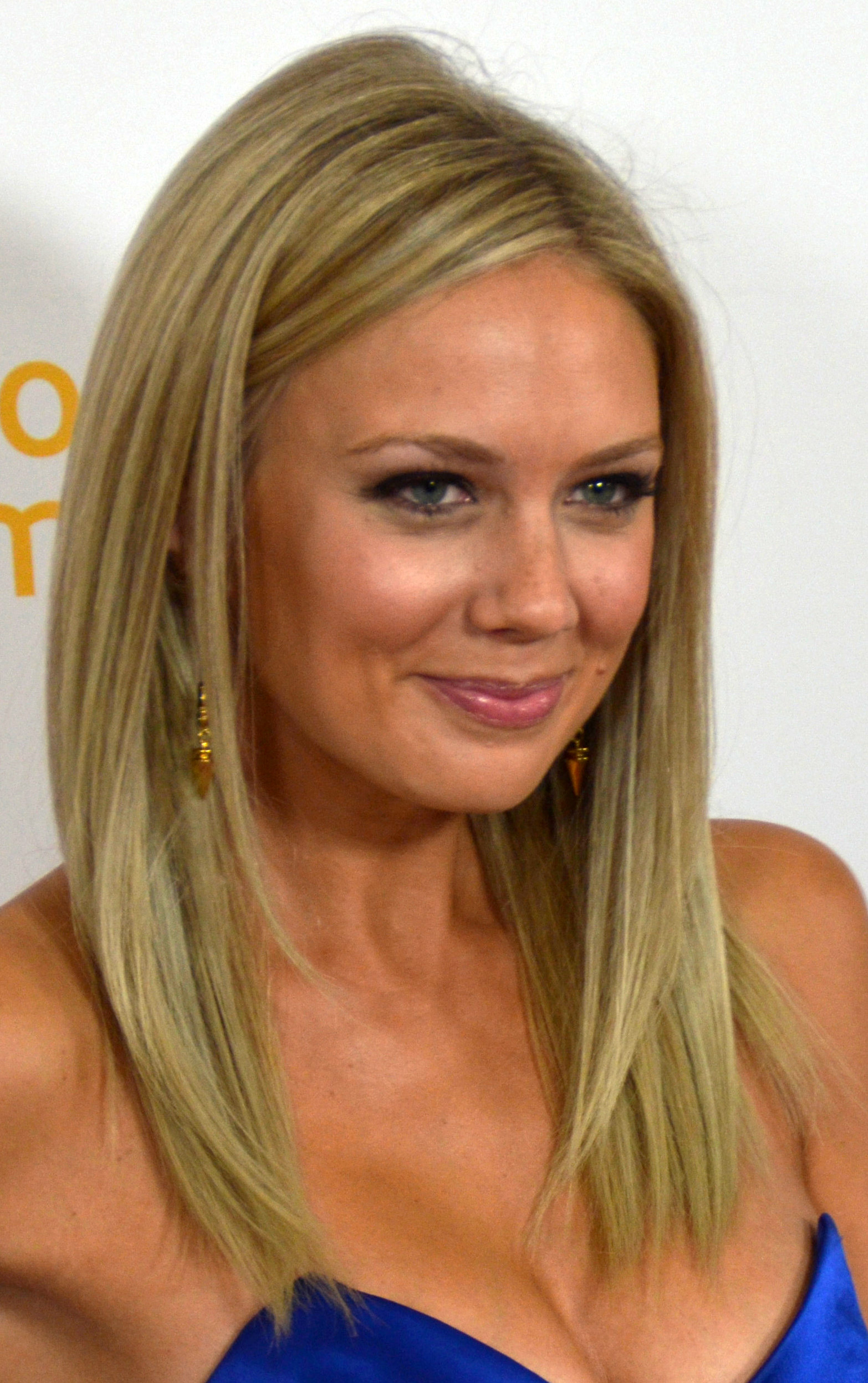
- Ordway in 2014
- Born: Melissa Pam Ordway; March 31, 1983 (age 43); Atlanta, Georgia, U.S.
- Education: Georgia State University
- Occupations: Actress, model
- Years active: 2004–present
- Known for: The Young and the Restless
- Spouse: Justin Gaston (m. 2012)
- Children: 2

Melissa Pam Gaston (née Ordway; born March 31, 1983) is an American actress and model. She is best known for portraying Abby Newman on the CBS soap opera The Young and the Restless. In May 2022, Gaston was nominated for an Emmy for Best Supporting Actress in a Daytime Drama for her portrayal of Abby. Gaston has been featured in campaigns by a number of major brands including Skechers, Old Navy, David's Bridal, Anchor Blue and Tillys.

== Early life ==
Ordway was born in Atlanta, Georgia, an only child, to John and Christine Ordway. She began doing community theatre in Atlanta and also acting in theatre productions at her high school in Snellville, Georgia. Ordway starred in the stage performances of Beauty and the Beast, The Women, A Midsummer Night's Dream, and many other shows. After graduating from high school, she attended Georgia State University and is a member of the Delta Zeta sorority. While at Georgia State, Ordway was chosen to participate in a reality show on MTV called The Assistant. She won the show and moved to Los Angeles to pursue a career in acting and modeling.

== Career ==
=== Modeling ===
Ordway is signed with Nous Model Management in Los Angeles and Front Management in Miami. She has been featured in campaigns for several brands including Skechers, Old Navy, David's Bridal, Anchor Blue. Tillys, Kirstie Kelly, and Fabrizio Gianni. Ordway has appeared in television commercials for Axe, Geico Cavemen, Pontiac Vibe, Carl's Jr. and Payless.

Ordway has also appeared on the cover Los Angeles Weddings Magazine, Grand Sierra Magazine and Hona Hou Magazine. She is featured as a frequent guest model on the game show The Price is Right including the week of October 7, 2015.

=== Acting ===
Ordway's first major acting part was the recurring roles of Jordanna on The CW television series Privileged. Her feature film debut was in 17 Again. Ordway has guest starred on such television shows as Entourage and How I Met Your Mother, as well as starring in several independent films including Callers, Tales of an Ancient Empire, and I Heart Veronica Martin. In 2010, Ordway appeared in the film The Last Song as Ashley and guest starred on Melrose Place as Morgan McKellan. She starred in the fantasy thriller film Tales of an Ancient Empire. In 2011, Ordway co-starred in Escapee and appeared in Ted directed by Seth MacFarlane.

Ordway was cast in the main role of Chloe Carter on the TeenNick series Hollywood Heights in 2012. In March 2013, she was cast in the role of Abby Newman on the CBS soap opera The Young and the Restless, replacing previous actress Marcy Rylan. Ordway also appeared in the 2013 supernatural thriller film Odd Thomas as Lysette.

== Personal life ==
On September 22, 2012, Ordway married actor Justin Gaston, whom she met during the filming of Escapee. In 2016, they adopted their first child, a daughter named Olivia Christine, born April 2016. Melissa gave birth to a daughter, their second child, Sophie Jolie, on December 9, 2017.

== Filmography ==
Film roles
Year	Title	Role	Notes
2006	Friendly Fire	Roller Goddess	
2008	I Heart Veronica Martin	Vanessa	Short film
2009	17 Again	Lauren	
2009	Miss March	Gorgeous Girl	
2009	Alpha Males Experiment	Tiffany	
2010	Elektra Luxx	Sabrina Capri	
2010	The Last Song	Ashley	
2010	Bones	Samantha Reeves	
2010	Tales of an Ancient Empire	Princess Tanis	
2011	Minkow	Mindy Jameson	
2011	Escapee	Renee Sanders	
2011	Retail	Lizzie	Short film
2011	Callers	Amanda	
2011	In Time	Leila	
2011	A Very Harold & Kumar 3D Christmas	Gracie	
2012	Ted	Michelle	
2013	Amelia's 25th	Loralei	
2013	The Incredible Burt Wonderstone	Reporter	
2013	Channeling	Victoria	
2013	Odd Thomas	Lysette	
2014	The Outsider	Samantha	
2018	Con Man	Mindy	Uncredited

Television roles
Year	Title	Role	Notes
2004	The Assistant	Herself	Contestant (winner); 8 episodes
2007	Entourage	Morgan	Episode: "The Young and the Stoned"
2007	How I Met Your Mother	Woman #1	Episode: "Third Wheel"
2008–2009	Privileged	Jordanna	Recurring role, 8 episodes
2009	Xtra Credit	Lindsey	Television movie
2010	Cold Case	Diane Yates '80	Episodes: "Bullet", "The Last Drive-In"
2010	Melrose Place	Morgan McKellan	Episodes: "Mulholland", "Santa Fe", "Wilshire"
2010	CSI: NY	Jenny Harper	Episode: "Out of the Sky"
2011	The Chicago Code	Taylor	Episode: "The Gold Coin Kid"
2011	Miami Magma	Emily Vitrini	Television movie
2012	Hollywood Heights	Chloe Carter / Cynthia Kowalski	Main role, 80 episodes
2012	The League	Sutton	Episode: "The Hoodie"
2013	90210	Sydney Price	Recurring role, 6 episodes
2014	The Real Housewives of Beverly Hills	Herself	Episode: "Star Sighting"
2013–present	The Young and the Restless	Abby Newman	Main role (2013–2024); Recurring role (2024–present)
2020	The Price Is Right	Herself / model	32 episodes
2020	Stalked by My Husband's Ex	Sierra	Television film

Video games
Year	Title	Role	Notes
2004	Grand Theft Auto: San Andreas	Radio Station Caller	Voice; uncredited

Music videos
Year	Title	Artist	Role
2008	"It's Over"	Jesse McCartney	Love interest

Preceded by Emme Rylan	Abby Newman (role); 2013–present	Incumbent
