= Dangerously Close =

1986 film by Albert Pyun

- Directed by: Albert Pyun
- Written by: Scott Fields; Marty Ross; John Stockwell
- Produced by: Harold Sobel
- Starring: John Stockwell; Carey Lowell; Madison Mason; Bradford Bancroft; J. Eddie Peck
- Cinematography: Walt Lloyd
- Edited by: Dennis M. O'Connor
- Music by: Michael McCarty
- Distributed by: The Cannon Group
- Release date: May 9, 1986
- Running time: 95 minutes
- Country: United States
- Language: English
- Budget: $1.5 million
- Box office: $2,026,765

Dangerously Close is a 1986 action thriller film directed by Albert Pyun. The film was noted at its time of release for being part of a wave of teen vigilante films in the 1980s exploring the right-wing jingoism that was gaining popularity in the United States.

== Plot ==
At an elite school, a group of students who call themselves The Sentinels begin terrorizing their socially undesirable classmates. Soon, one of their targets ends up brutally murdered. An editor of the high school paper begins to investigate and The Sentinels become even more ruthless in their behavior.

== Cast ==
- John Stockwell as Randy McDevitt
- J. Eddie Peck as Donny Lennox
- Carey Lowell as Julie
- Bradford Bancroft as Krooger Raines
- Don Michael Paul as "Ripper"
- Thom Mathews as Brian Rigletti
- Gerard Christopher as Lang Bridges
- Madison Mason as Corrigan
- Anthony De Longis as Smith Raddock
- Carmen Argenziano as Molly
- Miguel A. Nunez Jr. as Leon Biggs
- Dedee Pfeiffer as Nikki
- Karen Lorre as Betsy
- Greg Finley as Morelli
- Debra Berger as Ms. Hoffman
- Angel Tompkins as Ms. Waters
- Rosalind Allen as Mrs. McDonald
- David Boyle as Mr. McDonald
- Eric Bartsch as Pete Bentley
- Joe Nipote as Steve
- Tony Kienitz as Paul
- Dru-Anne Perry as Barbie
- Paul Mitchell Rosenblum as Toby
- Kelly Chapman as Bobbi Page
- Rebecca Cruz as Vanessa
- Dan Bradley as Bouncer
- Brian Maguire as Police Sergeant
- William Zimmerman as Policeman
- Tom Fridley as Student

== Soundtrack ==
The film features music from The Smithereens, who sang the film's theme song, "Blood and Roses," Depeche Mode, Black Uhuru, Green on Red, TSOL, Lords of the New Church, Lost Pilots, and Michael McCarty.

== Release ==
Dangerously Close received a wide release in North America on May 9, 1986 grossing $1,180,506 its first week, falling to $474,260 in its second week.

== Reception ==
On Rotten Tomatoes, the has an approval rating of 10% based on reviews from 10 critics.

Roger Ebert's review was negative, suggesting that the director "devoted a great deal of time and thought to how his movie looked, and almost no time at all to what, or who, it was about." Gene Siskel gave the film zero stars out of four and wrote that it "surely does not contain any socially redeeming value ... That the editor of the school paper, supposedly the smartest kid in the class, also can't figure out what's going on is just another nail in the film's coffin." Nina Darnton of The New York Times wrote, "Shooting parts of the film like an MTV video, with flash forwards, odd camera angles and long shots and using a driving loud score, the director creates a completely adolescent world where adults either don't matter or exert malevolent influences ... But unfortunately, the adolescent world created within the film extends to its conception." Variety wrote that it "comes very close to being quite a good film. For its first two-thirds an engrossingly tense suspenser about teen vigilantes run amok, pic becomes distressingly conventional in its final act, its unusual qualities virtually dissolving before one's eyes." Patrick Goldstein of the Los Angeles Times was positive, stating, "It's clear that the film makers are playing with fire here, especially considering the jingoist atmosphere that pervades Hollywood today. But Dangerously Close ... is more than just a stylish shocker. It captures the ugly side of a new teen-age obsession, forcing us to marvel at its ferocity and shudder at its possible consequences."
