= Hong Kong '97 =

- Theatrical release poster
- Directed by: Albert Pyun
- Written by: Randall Fontana
- Produced by: Tom Karnowski; Gary Schmoeller
- Starring: Robert Patrick; Ming-Na Wen; Tim Thomerson; Brion James
- Cinematography: George Mooradian
- Edited by: Ken Morrisey
- Music by: Michael McCarty
- Distributed by: Trimark Pictures
- Release date: November 9, 1994
- Running time: 91 minutes
- Country: United States
- Language: English
- Budget: $500,000

Hong Kong '97 is a 1994 American political action thriller film directed by Albert Pyun and starring Robert Patrick, Brion James and Tim Thomerson. The story revolves around the transfer of sovereignty over Hong Kong from the United Kingdom to the People's Republic of China. An assassin kills several high-ranking Chinese officials and must get out of the country quickly before he himself is murdered.

The movie was released directly to video on November 9, 1994.

== Plot ==
On June 30, 1997, assassin Reginald "Reg" Cameron enters a club and assassinates a high ranking People's Liberation Army officer, General Wu. Fearing revenge against him, several friends and colleagues urge him to flee Hong Kong. To add to the troubles, at midnight, the Chinese army will begin to enter the city as British rule expires on July 1. He must escape to avoid any further attempts on his life.

After escaping multiple assassination attempts against himself, his colleagues Simon and Jack drop him off at a safe house, Chun's Martial Arts School for the time being while they attempt to find out who is trying to kill him. Chun's is owned by Reg's ex-girlfriend Katie and her grandfather Master Chun. Katie reveals to Reg that her grandfather defected from Red China during the Cold War and will be wanted once Chinese rule goes into effect by the government. They plan to flee on a flight to Malaysia just before midnight. While Master Chun is delighted to see Reg again but Katie eagerly dismisses him when Simon calls with information about his would-be assassins.

On his way to meet Simon and Jack, more would-be assassins attempt to kill Reg. He is intercepted by Simon and Jack in a car where they explain that Triad gangs are attempting to kill him due to the high price put on his head for his earlier assassination. Knowing he must finally flee, he decides to meet with Katie and Master Chun for their flight to Malaysia. On the way he explains why he is such a successful assassin. He does not care about anything caught in collateral damage as he had to witness his parents being murdered in India when he was 11 years old.

At the airport, Reg prepares to part ways from Simon and Jack by giving his guns to Jack, whom the latter had no idea he was an assassin at first. However, as Chun, Katie and Reg are about to board the plane, more assassins converge on the airstrip. Jack decides to finally use a gun and starts shooting at the assassins, killing some. However, he eventually is shot and killed, which Reg witnesses and deeply affects him. While fleeing the airport on a motorboat, Chun is shot in the arm. Reg's protégé and lover, Li, arrives at the port to assist in their escape. However, she is killed and her death affects Reg even more than Jack's death. Knowing they need medical attention, they stop at a Chinese checkpoint as troops are rolling in from the mainland for assistance. Katie is skeptical due to Chun being a defector but reluctantly accepts help from the guards. Chun receives treatment for his wounds and tells the others to meet him at Kennedy Port in the morning.

They eventually travel to Reg and Simon's company to call off the hit on Reg's head so it will be easier for them to flee the country. Going through a shootout to the main computer, they are able to mark Reg as being dead and the bounty collected by Simon. But before they can escape, a colleague of Reg and Simon, Malcolm Goodchild, appears and reveals that it was he who placed the bounty on Reg, knowing that he would be labeled as a national hero for killing an assassin of a Chinese General. Reg and Malcolm fight on an elevator and as Malcolm gains the upper hand, the door opens and Katie shoots Malcolm.

That morning, the four escape Hong Kong via boat from Kennedy Port along with Chun, who meets them there as promised.

== Cast ==
- Robert Patrick as Reginald Cameron
- Brion James as Simon Alexander
- Tim Thomerson as Jack McGraw
- Ming-Na Wen as Katie Chun
- Selena Chau-yuet You as Li
- Michael Lee as Chun
- Andrew Divoff as Malcolm Goodchild

== Reception ==
Hong Kong '97 attracted mixed reviews, and currently has a Rotten Tomatoes public rating of 53%.

== See also ==
- List of films set in Hong Kong
- Hong Kong 97 (video game)
