= Omega Doom =

- Official DVD cover
- Directed by: Albert Pyun
- Screenplay by: Albert Pyun; Ed Naha
- Based on: Yojimbo by Akira Kurosawa (uncredited)
- Produced by: Tom Karnowski; Gary Schmoeller
- Starring: Rutger Hauer; Shannon Whirry; Norbert Weisser; Tina Coté
- Cinematography: George Mooradian
- Edited by: Ken Morissey; Joe Shugart
- Music by: Anthony Riparetti
- Distributed by: Largo Entertainment; Filmwerks
- Release date: 1996
- Running time: 84 minutes
- Country: United States
- Language: English

Omega Doom is a 1996 American science fiction action film directed by Albert Pyun and starring Rutger Hauer. It was written by Pyun and Ed Naha. The story, set in a dystopian future, concerns a robot warrior who, during a nuclear winter, plays both sides of a robot civil war in a small town. The film is mostly based on Yojimbo by Akira Kurosawa. It is considered a cult film.

== Plot summary ==
Opening quote

And death shall have no dominion.
Dead men naked, they shall be one ...
with the man in the wind and the west moon.
When their bones are picked clean and the clean bones gone ...
they shall have stars at elbow and feet.
Though they go mad, they shall be sane.
Though they sink through the sea, they shall rise again.
Though lovers be lost, love shall not.
And death shall have no dominion. ...

— From the poem And death shall have no dominion by Dylan Thomas (narrated by Rutger Hauer)

At the end of a World War between humans and robots, a nuclear bomb was detonated and a Dark Age begun, without technology or electricity. On the last day of the war, as the nuclear bombs are detonating, one of the robots, Omega Doom, is shot in his head by a dying soldier. The shot causes Doom's programming for the destruction of mankind to be erased.

After the world was cleared of humanity by the nuclear attack, only the cyborgs and robots remain. Some time later, Omega Doom, now a wandering warrior, arrives at a destroyed city, where he encounters an unusual community of robots and roms (newer and more advanced robots), who are in conflict.

At the city Omega Doom finds there are two remaining peaceful robots - a former nanny who now works as a bartender and the head of a former teacher, whom the other robots use as a ball. Omega Doom helps The Head find a body and tells Doom about a rumored stock of hidden weapons. Both the robots and the roms want these weapons in order to continue the destruction of the remaining humans, since they are now part of a legend which claims that one day humanity will come back with a renewed army and destroy all the robots.

Eventually, Omega Doom gets the robots to promise to destroy the roms in exchange for half of the weapons; but he also proposes the same deal to the roms. The robots and the roms end up fighting each other, ensuring their mutual destruction. Afterwards, Doom leaves the last two peaceful robots (The Bartender and The Head) and the one remaining rom in charge of the city, knowing that they will not attack any surviving humans, and continues his wandering through earth.

== Cast ==
- Rutger Hauer as Omega Doom
- Anna Katarina as The Bartender
- Norbert Weisser as The Head
- Shannon Whirry as Zed, Droid Leader
- Simon Poland as Zed Too, Droid
- Jahi Zuri as Marko, Droid
- Earl White as Titus, Droid
- Tina Coté as Blackheart, Rom Leader
- Jill Pierce as Zinc, Rom
- Cynthia Ireland as Ironface, Rom
- Jozef Apolen as The Scientist

== Production ==
Christopher Lambert was considered for the lead role before Rutger Hauer was cast.

The screenplay written by Albert Pyun and Ed Naha was originally set in Paris, at EuroDisney. The characters were supposed to be an animatronic theme park's figures who continue to operate after a global catastrophe. Each "Zone" was the domain of the animatronic characters who were part of that same zone's theme. Omega Doom was originally built to be part of a new exhibit at EuroDisney established around the Terminator franchise and the entire setting was within the theme park.

== Reception ==
=== Critical response ===
TV Guide rated it 1/4 stars and wrote that "Omega Doom is merely an exercise in reviving moldy sci-fi cliches from their familiar genre graves". Keith Bailey of the Radio Times rated it 1/5 stars and called the film's action sequences "so poorly directed as to be incomprehensible". Nathan Rabin of The A.V. Club wrote: "In addition to being incompetently written and directed, Omega Doom is also laughably pretentious".
