= Albert Pyun =

American film director (1953–2022)

- Born: May 19, 1953; Territory of Hawaii, U.S.
- Died: November 26, 2022 (aged 69); Las Vegas, Nevada, U.S.
- Occupation: Film director
- Years active: 1970–2018

Albert Pyun (May 19, 1953 – November 26, 2022) was an American film director who made low-budget B-movies and direct-to-video action films.

The Independent Film Channel said that Pyun "has carved out a unique niche as a director of low-budget, high-concept genre films starring actors past their prime", adding that "others believe this a charitable description for Pyun, who has also been derided as the new Ed Wood."

Though his films frequently blended kickboxing and hybrid martial arts with science fiction and dystopic or post-apocalyptic themes, which often include cyborgs, Pyun stated in a 2012 interview that "I have really no interest in cyborgs. And I've never really had any interest in post-apocalyptic stories or settings. It just seemed that those situations presented a way for me to make movies with very little money, and to explore ideas that I really wanted to explore — even if they were [controversial]."

Pyun's films include The Sword and the Sorcerer, Cyborg, Captain America, and Nemesis.

== Early life ==
Pyun was born on May 19, 1953. Pyun was a "military brat" and lived on bases around the world until his father settled in Hawaii. He went to school in Kailua, a small town located on the windward side of Oahu. Pyun's first 8mm and 16mm movies were made in Kailua and he credits living in foreign countries and growing up in Hawaii as strong influences on his filmmaking style. While in high school, Pyun worked at a number of production houses in Honolulu before receiving an invitation by the Japanese actor, Toshiro Mifune, to travel to Japan for an internship. Initially Pyun was to intern on the Akira Kurosawa film, Dersu Uzala, which was to star Mifune. but the actor decided not to do the film and instead Pyun found himself working on a Mifune TV series under the tutelage of Kurosawa's Director of Photography, Takao Saito (Red Beard).

Pyun returned to Hawaii and began working as a commercial film editor at KGMB in Honolulu and edited commercials for agencies such as Bozell Jacobs and Leo Burnett. After several years as an editor, Pyun moved to Los Angeles to become a feature film director.

== 1980s ==
Pyun's first film The Sword and the Sorcerer remains his highest grossing, eventually earning $36,714,025 in the United States. Opening on April 30, 1982, it grossed $4,100,886 which ranked the film second that week in America. Richard Lynch received the Best Supporting Actor Saturn Award for his performance as Cromwell. During the production of the film, stuntman Jack Tyree was killed while doing a high fall stunt at Griffith Park in Los Angeles. While performing a 78 ft (24 m) fall in heavy costume and makeup, Tyree struck his airbag off center, resulting in a fatal impact.

With the success of The Sword and the Sorcerer, Pyun was attached to several science fiction projects in 1984 including Total Recall, to be produced by Dino De Laurentiis at Universal Pictures, with a screenplay based on the Philip K. Dick story written by Ronald Shusett (Alien). At the time, William Hurt was attached to star.

His second film, Radioactive Dreams, was awarded the Golden Raven at the 5th Brussels International Fantastic Film Festival in 1987. "Radioactive Dreams" recently screened at Exhumed Films' 2013 eX Fest.

Pyun's career took a more mainstream turn with the thriller Dangerously Close and the romantic adventure film Down Twisted, starring Carey Lowell, Charles Rocket and Courteney Cox.

In the late 1980s, Pyun made Alien from L.A., featuring supermodel Kathy Ireland whom he cast after seeing a photo of her. The film later appeared on an episode of Mystery Science Theater 3000.

Pyun's Cyborg opened as the fourth-highest-grossing film in America on April 7, 1989. It eventually grossed $10,166,459 in the United States. In 2011, twenty-two years after making Cyborg, Pyun released his director's cut. A Metro-Goldwyn-Mayer re-release on Blu-ray followed in October 2012.

In 1989, Pyun made Deceit and Captain America. A director's cut of Captain America was released in May 2011.

== 1990s ==
In the early 1990s, Pyun made Nemesis with Olivier Gruner and Thomas Jane; Brainsmasher... A Love Story followed in 1993 with Teri Hatcher and Andrew Dice Clay; and Mean Guns with Christopher Lambert and Ice-T in 1997.

In June 1991, Pyun's film Kickboxer 2, written by David Goyer (Ghost Rider, Blade, The Dark Knight), opened in theaters to mixed reviews.

Other 1990s films include Knights with Kris Kristofferson, Kathy Long and Lance Henriksen; Dollman starring Tim Thomerson as a 13-inch-tall Dirty Harry-type cop from another planet; Raven Hawk with Rachel McLish and William Atherton; Spitfire with Henriksen, Sarah Douglas, Tim Thomerson and Kristie Phillips; Hong Kong '97 with Robert Patrick and Ming-Na Wen; Adrenalin: Fear the Rush with Christopher Lambert and Natasha Henstridge; Post Mortem with Charlie Sheen; Crazy Six with Rob Lowe, Mario Van Peebles and Burt Reynolds; Omega Doom with Rutger Hauer and Shannon Whirry; and Arcade with Megan Ward, Seth Green, Peter Billingsly and John Delancie. Pyun also made his only episodic TV work to date for the NBC/Columbia Tri-Star show The Fifth Corner with Alex McArthur, Kim Delaney and James Coburn.

== 2000s ==
Pyun directed and produced Ticker for Artisan Entertainment in May 2000, which featured Steven Seagal, Tom Sizemore, Dennis Hopper, Jaime Pressly, Nas and Ice-T plus Chilli of the R&B group TLC. In 2002, it was among five films honored for sales by the Video Software Dealers Association in the category of 'Direct-to-Video/Limited Release by an Independent Studio'.

In 2004, Pyun went to the U.S. territory of Guam and, along with film producer John Laing, convinced the Guam government to put up an $800,000 loan guarantee to finance their film Max Havoc: Curse of the Dragon. In his effort to convince Guam officials to approve the loan guarantee, Pyun told them that he and his producer (Laing) had a "sterling financial record" and that neither he nor John Laing had ever defaulted on a loan. In 2006, Laing defaulted on the loan, and Guam lost its guarantee. Laing blamed Pyun for the failure of the film.

An out of court settlement was reached between John Laing and the Guam Economic Development Authority in May 2012 but up until October 2012 Laing has not honored the terms of that settlement. In late 2012, GEDA Administrator Karl Pangelinan reported Laing had made a $75,000 payment on the balance of the settlement amount and the balance outstanding was $75,000. GEDA officials confirmed the final payment was made in February 2013 bringing the matter to a close. Pyun was not involved in any of the legal litigation between GEDA and Laing.

In September 2008, Pyun began production on Tales of an Ancient Empire. Shooting began on October 12, 2008. The film premiered at Louisville, Kentucky's Fright Night Film Fest. The film was eventually released by Lions Gate Films in January 2012 and stars Kevin Sorbo, Michael Paré, Melissa Ordway and Ralf Moeller.

== 2010s and 2020s ==
Pyun's film Road to Hell won the Best Picture award at the Yellow Fever Independent Film Festival in Belfast in 2011. Later in 2012, it opened the PollyGrind Film Festival in Las Vegas where it won Best Fantasy Film, Best Actor, Best Actress, Best Supporting Actress, Best Song, Best Use of Songs, Best Use of Music, Best Visual Effects, Best Screenplay, and the Newcomer Award.

== Illness and death ==
In late 2013, Pyun announced he had multiple sclerosis. In March 2014, his health had improved enough for him to film The Interrogation of Cheryl Cooper. By 2017, he also had dementia. However, he sought funding for projects as late as 2018.

In November 2022, Pyun's wife and producer Cynthia Curnan posted on her Facebook page that Pyun's health was in rapid decline and that he had been placed in hospice care. Curnan stated that Pyun wanted to hear from his supporters and asked if people would write him messages that she could read to him. Her request was amplified by the Facebook page for film director Sam Peckinpah and on film review websites such as JoBlo and ComicBook.com. Curnan reported to fans a week later that Pyun was "enjoying messages from supporters" and that they helped to "alleviate guilt Pyun has been feeling because he was unable to complete two films before he had to stop working."

Pyun died in Las Vegas on November 26, 2022, at the age of 69.

== Awards ==
- 2005 – Golden Unicorn Award for lifetime achievement at the Estepona International Film Festival of Fantasy and Horror.
- 2011 – Induction into the B-movie Hall of Fame at the B-Movie Celebration.
- 2012 – Lifetime Achievement-Filmmaker of a Different Breed Award at the PollyGrind Film Festival.
- 2013 – Groundbreaker Award – BUT FILM FESTIVAL (Breda, Netherlands)
- 2013 – Indie Genre Spirit Award – Buffalo Dreams Fantastic Film Festival

== Filmography ==
=== Films ===
- The Sword and the Sorcerer (1982)
- Radioactive Dreams (1985)
- Dangerously Close (1986)
- Vicious Lips (1986)
- Down Twisted (1987)
- Alien from L.A. (1988)
- Cyborg (1989)
- Deceit (1990)
- Captain America (1990)
- Bloodmatch (1991)
- Kickboxer 2 (1991)
- Dollman (1991)
- Nemesis (1992)
- Arcade (1993)
- Knights (1993)
- Brainsmasher... A Love Story (1993)
- Kickboxer 4 (1994)
- Hong Kong 97 (1994)
- Heatseeker (1995)
- Nemesis 2: Nebula (1995)
- Spitfire (1995)
- Omega Doom (1996)
- Adrenalin: Fear the Rush (1996)
- Nemesis 3: Prey Harder (1996)
- Raven Hawk (1996)
- Nemesis 4: Death Angel (1996)
- Blast (1997)
- Mean Guns (1997)
- Crazy Six (1998)
- Postmortem (1998)
- Urban Menace (1999)
- The Wrecking Crew (2000)
- Ticker (2001)
- Max Havoc: Curse of the Dragon (2004)
- Left for Dead (2007)
- Road to Hell (2008)
- Bulletface (2010)
- Tales of an Ancient Empire (2010)
- The Interrogation of Cheryl Cooper (2014)
- Interstellar Civil War (2017)
