= Arcade (film) =

- Video release poster
- Directed by: Albert Pyun
- Screenplay by: David S. Goyer
- Story by: Charles Band
- Produced by: Cathy Gesualdo
- Starring: Megan Ward; Peter Billingsley; John de Lancie; Sharon Farrell; Seth Green; A. J. Langer; Bryan Dattilo
- Cinematography: George Mooradian
- Edited by: Miles Wynton
- Music by: Alan Howarth; Tony Riparetti
- Distributed by: Full Moon Entertainment; Paramount Pictures
- Release dates: July 20, 1993 (Germany); March 30, 1994 (U.S.)
- Running time: 85 minutes
- Country: United States
- Language: English
- Budget: $650,000

Arcade is a 1993 B-movie science fiction film directed by Albert Pyun, written by David S. Goyer and produced by Full Moon Entertainment. It stars Megan Ward, Peter Billingsley, John de Lancie, Sharon Farrell, Seth Green, A. J. Langer, and Bryan Dattilo.

== Plot ==
Alex Manning (Megan Ward) is a troubled suburban teenager. Her mother committed suicide and the school counselor feels that she has not dealt with her feelings properly. Alex and her friends visit the local video arcade known as "Dante's Inferno", where a new virtual reality arcade game called Arcade is being test marketed by a computer company CEO, Difford, who hands out free samples of the home console version and hypes up the game.

It soon becomes clear that the teenagers who play the game and lose are imprisoned inside the virtual reality world by the central villain: Arcade. Arcade was once a little boy who was beaten to death by his mother, and the computer company felt it would be a good idea to use some of the boy's brain cells to make the game's villain more realistic. Instead, it made the game deadly. The game's programmer knew there would be a problem with this and tried to convince the computer company, Vertigo/Tronics, to halt the game's release.

Nick and Alex enlist the help of the game's programmer and head to the video arcade for a final showdown with Arcade and his deadly virtual world. While Alex is able to release her friends from a virtual prison, she also frees the evil little boy, who taunts Alex in the final moments of the film.

In the original CGI version, the film ends with Alex, her friends, and Albert (the programmer) walking away from Dante's Inferno, with the donor's soul seemingly laid to rest.

== Cast ==
Actor	Role
Megan Ward	Alex Manning
Peter Billingsley	Nick
John de Lancie	Difford
Sharon Farrell	Alex's Mom
Seth Green	Stilts
A.J. Langer	Laurie
Bryan Dattilo	Greg
Brandon Rane	Benz
Sean Bagley	Lab Assistant
B.J. Barie	DeLoache
Humberto Ortiz	Boy
Norbert Weisser	Albert
Don Stark	Finster
Dorothy Dells	Mrs. Weaver
Todd Starks	Burt Manning
Alexandria Byrne	Kid at Arcade Parlour

== Production ==
The film features heavy use of CGI, which was fully redone after The Walt Disney Company named Full Moon in a potential lawsuit. The Sky Cycles in this film resembled the light cycles from Disney's Tron. The VideoZone video magazine (a staple of Full Moon films during the 1990s) as well as some trailers showed footage from the original version of the film. As a rarity, the VideoZone featured on the Full Moon Classics DVD release of the film contains no footage of the released film's CGI, but only of the original film's version.

Despite the change in CGI, the original CGI version did manage to find a release in some places outside of North America, such as Argentina, Germany, Poland and Italy.

== See also ==
- Brainscan
- The Dungeonmaster
- Tron
- Johnny Mnemonic
- The Lawnmower Man
