= Captain America (1990 film) =

1990 superhero film directed by Albert Pyun

- Promotional poster
- Directed by: Albert Pyun
- Screenplay by: Stephen Tolkin
- Story by: Stephen Tolkin; Larry Block
- Based on: Captain America by: Joe Simon; Jack Kirby
- Produced by: Menahem Golan
- Starring: Matt Salinger; Ronny Cox; Ned Beatty; Darren McGavin; Michael Nouri; Melinda Dillon; Kim Gillingham; Scott Paulin
- Cinematography: Philip Alan Waters
- Edited by: Jon Poll
- Music by: Barry Goldberg
- Production companies: 21st Century Film Corporation; Marvel Entertainment Group; Jadran Film
- Distributed by: Columbia TriStar Home Video
- Release dates: December 14, 1990 (United Kingdom); July 22, 1992 (United States)
- Running time: 97 minutes
- Country: United States
- Language: English
- Budget: $3 million
- Box office: $150,000 (UK & France)

Captain America is a 1990 American superhero film based on the Marvel Comics superhero of the same name. It is directed by Albert Pyun and written by Stephen Tolkin, from a story by Tolkin and Larry Block. It stars Matt Salinger in the title role and Scott Paulin as his nemesis the Red Skull, with Ronny Cox, Ned Beatty, Darren McGavin, Francesca Neri, Michael Nouri and Melinda Dillon. The film was produced by Menahem Golan for the now-defunct 21st Century Film Corporation.

While the film takes several liberties with the comic's storyline, it features Steve Rogers becoming Captain America during World War II to battle the Red Skull, being frozen in ice, and subsequently being revived to save the President of the United States from a crime family that dislikes his environmentalist policies.

While the film received a theatrical release internationally, it was released direct-to-video by Columbia TriStar Home Video in the United States. It received generally unfavorable reviews from critics, though it has since developed a cult following.

== Plot ==
In 1936, in Italy, the Fascist government kidnaps child prodigy Tadzio De Santis and uses him in a project to create a supersoldier. The procedure's inventor, Dr. Maria Vaselli, objects and defects to the United States.

Seven years later, the American government finds volunteer Steve Rogers, a frail polio survivor. The formula cures Rogers' ailments and gives him superior strength and endurance, but before more supersoldiers can be created, Vaselli is murdered by a Nazi spy working with Lieutenant Fleming. The now adult de Santis, with red-scarred skin from Vaselli's earlier procedure, has now become the Red Skull, with physical prowess equal to Rogers, and plans an intercontinental ballistic missile strike at the White House. Rogers, code-named Captain America, is sent to neutralize the threat. He penetrates the Nazi launch compound, but the Red Skull ties him to the missile. Captain America grabs the Red Skull's arm, tricking him into cutting off his own hand to escape being taken along. A young boy, Tom Kimball, photographs Captain America over Washington, D.C., kicking the missile off course to crash in Alaska, burying itself and Rogers under the ice.

In 1992, Tom Kimball was elected President of the United States. He pushes environmentalist legislation that angers the military-industrial complex headed by now-General Fleming. Fleming meets with the Red Skull and leaders of a global shadow organization. Since the war, the Red Skull has raised a daughter, Valentina, and become the head of a powerful crime family who murdered Americans who were against militarism and fascism, including Dr. Martin Luther King Jr., President John F. Kennedy, and Robert Kennedy. The Red Skull notes that the assassinations caused the public to posthumously venerate those people and instead orders Kimball's kidnapping and brainwashing.

Rogers' body is found frozen in ice. He revives and escapes, making international headlines and alerting both Kimball and the Red Skull. After escaping Red Skull's thugs, Rogers brushes off reporter and Kimball's childhood friend Sam Kolawetz, who has long hounded the Skull, and hitchhikes to his wartime girlfriend, Bernice, in California. She has long since married and has a daughter, Sharon, who helps Rogers catch up. Valentina and her thugs kill Bernice while looking for Rogers. Learning that Kimball has been kidnapped, Rogers and Sharon recover Vaselli's diary and learn Red Skull's original name. In the Red Skull's childhood home, they find a tape recording of the murder of his family. Sharon gets herself kidnapped as a distraction to allow Rogers, who dons his costume, to enter the Red Skull's castle.

Kimball is rescued by Captain America, and they lay siege to the castle. Red Skull pulls out a remote trigger for a nuclear bomb, but Rogers distracts him with the recording of the De Santis family's murder. Before the Skull recovers, Rogers uses his shield to send him off a cliff, killing him, and as Valentina prepares to kill Rogers, she is hit by his returning shield. United States Marines arrive, save the President, and arrest the kidnappers. Rogers and Sharon embrace, and a news voiceover announces Kimball's environmental pact as agreed upon by countries around the world.

== Cast ==
- Matt Salinger as Steve Rogers / Captain America
- Ronny Cox as President Tom Kimball
  - Garrette Ratliffe as young Tom
- Scott Paulin as Tadzio De Santis / Red Skull
  - Massimilio Massimi as young Tadzio
- Ned Beatty as Sam Kolawetz
  - Thomas Beatty as young Sam
- Darren McGavin as General Fleming
  - Bill Mumy as young Lieutenant Fleming
- Francesca Neri as Valentina De Santis
- Michael Nouri as Lieutenant Colonel Louis
- Kim Gillingham as Bernice Stewart / Sharon Cooperman
- Sven Medvešek as Pietro
- Melinda Dillon as Mrs. Rogers
- Carla Cassola as Dr. Maria Vaselli
- Wayde Preston as Jack Cooperman
- Mustafa Nadarević as Tadzio's Father

== Production ==
=== Development ===
The rights were sold to The Cannon Group founders Menahem Golan and Yoram Globus in 1984. Initially Cannon regular Michael Winner (Death Wish 1–3) was attached to direct a script by James Silke. However, in 1986, Winner scrapped the Silke script and recruited British television writer Stan Hey (Auf Wiedersehen, Pet, Dalziel and Pascoe). According to Hey, the film involved a stolen Statue of Liberty plot by an elderly Red Skull, aided by a female death cult and Steve Rogers working as an artist. Later, after some negative feedback for the Winner & Hey version, Winner started over, working alongside Stan Lee and Larry Block, with an advertisement released with their names listed. Michael Dudikoff was set to play the title character, and Steve James would play Sam Wilson/Falcon. By 1987 Winner was off the project and actor-director John Stockwell came aboard with a script by Stephen Tolkin.

Golan left Cannon in 1989, and as part of a severance package, he was given control of 21st Century Film Corporation and allowed to carry over the film rights to the Captain America character. Director Albert Pyun, who had previously worked at Cannon, was brought on board and worked with the Tolkin Block script that originally started at Cannon. In an interview with Cinefantastique, Tolkin explained some of the changes he and Block made from the original comic, including changing the appearance and character of the Red Skull: "I didn't think people wanted to keep looking at this horrible skull face forever".

=== Casting ===
Dolph Lundgren and Arnold Schwarzenegger were both considered for the title role. Val Kilmer was offered the part, but turned it down to work on The Doors instead.

Pyun originally wanted two different actors to play Rogers/Captain America; one before and one after his supersoldier transformation. He wanted Matt Salinger to play pre-supersoldier Rogers and Howie Long to play post-supersoldier Captain America. However, Marvel insisted that only one actor play the character.

Pyun also wanted Captain America to use his "tactical" black suit in the film, to reflect his appearance in the comics at the time, but this too was rejected by Marvel, who wanted him to retain his classic costume.

=== Filming ===
Principal photography began in 1989 and was completed in 1990. Though the production originally planned to shoot on-location in Italy, budgetary issues meant that shooting moved to cheaper Yugoslavia, and the script was heavily rewritten as many scenes couldn't be shot as scripted.

Filming took place in the cities of Zagreb and Dubrovnik, and at Jadran Film Studios. Other scenes were shot in Los Angeles. Entertainment Tonight also visited the set during the making of the film, airing a segment in August 1989.

Stan Lee filmed a cameo appearance that was ultimately cut.

In 1989, Variety reported that "46 licensees have signed up for various merchandising rights to 21st's upcoming Captain America and Spider-Man pictures" with a release date set for President's Day weekend in 1990.

== Release ==
The film was intended for release in August 1990, to coincide with the fiftieth anniversary of Captain America. Several release dates were announced between Fall 1990 and Winter 1991, but the film went unreleased for two years before debuting direct-to-video and on cable television in the United States in the summer of 1992. In UK, 20/20 vision released the VHS in 1991 before its release in the United States. The film was given a limited theatrical release internationally. In the Philippines, the film was released as Bloodmatch on December 11, 1991, in a double feature with a Snoopy film; posters miscredit Jean-Claude Van Damme as the "martial art instructor".

The film was invited to screen as part of the 2013 Comic-Con in San Diego in July 2013.

The film also had its debut on Cinemax Asia.

=== Versions ===
There are three different versions of Captain America.

The Theatrical Cut (1990, 97 mins.)
This is the official and most well known version from 21st Century Film Corporation, that's been available since 1991 in the U.K. and 1992 in the U.S.

Captain America - The Director's Cut (2011, 110 mins.)
Albert Pyun's 2011 self-released version, sold as a BD-R directly to fans via his website and at limited theatrical screenings to capitalize on Marvel's big-budget Captain America: The First Avenger. Pyun reinserted deleted footage sourced from his personal workprint, which fundamentally altered the tone by prioritizing Steve Rogers' character development. It is essentially the Theatrical Cut with added scenes spliced in, and strangely even fully repeats certain scenes as flashbacks.

Albert Pyun's Captain America (2025, 111 mins.)
Also known as "The Pyun Cut," this is Albert Pyun's personal 1989 workprint of what he always claimed was his ultimate vision of the film, featuring a non-linear flashback structure and a moody electronic score. This alters the tone of the film entirely and goes even deeper into Steve Rogers' character arc; a familiar, yet completely different vision than what was officially released. It is considered by many fans and film enthusiasts as a far superior cut of Captain America.

The Theatrical Cut is by far the best looking of the three versions in terms of picture quality, due to the fact that it is the only cut to receive a studio mastering. The 2011 and 2025 cuts are unmastered, rough outputs.

== Reception ==
On the review aggregator website Rotten Tomatoes, 16% of 19 critics' reviews are positive, with an average rating of 3.8/10. The website's consensus reads: "Lacking a script, budget, direction, or star capable of doing justice to its source material, this Captain America should have been left under the ice."

In one of the few contemporary reviews, Entertainment Weekly critic Frank Lovece wrote, "The movie isn't merely wrong for kids – it opens in pre-war Italy with a sequence in Italian with subtitles, and a machine-gun slaughter – it's just all wrong", and decried the "shapeless blob of a plot" in grading the film "F".

Variety called Captain America "a strictly routine superhero outing" and "this fantasy adventure is missing the large-scale setpieces" that audiences have come to expect."

IGN gave two different reviews for each version: the unfavorable rating for the MGM version and the average rating for the Collector's Edition version. Cinelinx's Victor Medina rated the film B−, but rated the overall DVD grade C− because of the DVD video transfer and the lack of extras.

Several retrospecitive reviews were more positive, saying the film had been unfairly panned and also believed the director's cut was better than the studio version.

In 2016, Flickering Myth's Neil Calloway said, "It's not a great film, and is really only of interest as a pre-MCU curio for hardcore Marvel fans."

The film gained some cult followings. Film Trap's Justin Decloux later reviewed and showed a newly found Director's Cut of the film via a Twitch stream and praised it for its more somber tone and improved ending. Many others, as well, who saw it also considered it a substantial improvement over the theatrical cut and called for its official release.

== Box office ==
Upon its 1990 release in Europe, the film sold 24,814 tickets in the United Kingdom and 33,043 tickets in France, for a total of 57,857 tickets sold in the UK and France.

== Home media ==
The film was first released on VHS and LaserDisc by 20/20 Vision (UK VHS) in 1991 and by Columbia TriStar Home Video (US VHS and LD) in 1992.

The film was released on DVD as part of the MGM limited edition made-on-demand series.

A Blu-ray Disc of the film was released by Shout! Factory on May 21, 2013, as a Collector's Edition which features a widescreen HD presentation and brand new interviews with director Pyun and star Salinger.

Albert Pyun's 111-minute director's cut was released on a limited edition Blu-ray in 2025 by Yippee Ki-Yay Mother Video, mastered from Pyun's sole surviving 35mm print.

== Legacy ==
A comic book adaptation was released two years after the film's release, titled Captain America: The Movie! The story was written by Stan Lee and features some minor changes from the original film.

== See also ==
- The Fantastic Four (unreleased 1994 film)
