= Tales of an Ancient Empire =

- Theatrical release poster
- Directed by: Albert Pyun
- Written by: Cynthia Curnan
- Produced by: Nicholas Celozzi; Cynthia Curnan; Sazzy Lee Calhoun
- Starring: Kevin Sorbo; Michael Paré; Sasha Mitchell; Olivier Gruner; Melissa Ordway; Whitney Able; Victoria Maurette
- Cinematography: Philip Alan Waters
- Edited by: David Lamb
- Music by: Anthony Riparetti
- Production companies: Underhill Films; NECA Films
- Distributed by: KIPPJK (theatrical); Lionsgate Home Entertainment (DVD)
- Release date: July 31, 2010
- Running time: 85 minutes
- Country: United States
- Language: English

Tales of an Ancient Empire is a 2010 American sword-and-sorcery film directed by Albert Pyun and starring Kevin Sorbo, Michael Paré, Whitney Able, Melissa Ordway, Ralf Moeller, Lee Horsley, and Victoria Maurette. It is a sequel to Pyun's directorial debut, The Sword and the Sorcerer.

== Synopsis ==
Queen Ma’at finds her kingdom of Abelar under attack when treasure seekers accidentally open the tomb of vampire queen Xia. The Queen sends her half-sister, Princess Tanis, to the outlaw city of Douras to find her real father so he can save the kingdom.

Meanwhile, servant girl Kara who shares the same father as Tanis but with a different mother, Xia, discovers that Xia is really a vampire and begins hunting Tanis. Once in Douras, the Princess finds her half-brother Aedan and convinces him to help her. Together they locate half-sister Malia, another half-sister Rajan and her daughter Alana. With this small group they plan to thwart vampire queen Xia.

== Cast ==
- Kevin Sorbo as Aedan
- Michael Paré as Oda
- Whitney Able as Xia
- Melissa Ordway as Princess Tanis
- Sarah Ann Schultz as Malia
- Janelle Giumarra as Rajan
- Inbar Lavi as Alana
- Jennifer Siebel Newsom as Queen Ma'at
- Ralf Moeller as General Hafez
- Matthew Willig as Giant Iberian
- Victoria Maurette as Kara
- Lee Horsley as Talon
- Sasha Mitchell as Rodrigo

== Production ==
The sequel was first announced in 1982, in the end credits of The Sword and the Sorcerer. Production itself officially began with scriptwriting in November 2007, followed by principal photography in California the following year. According to Pyun, actors considered for the film included Yancy Butler, Kari Wuhrer, Mark Dacascos, Val Kilmer, Steven Seagal, Olivier Gruner, and Christopher Lambert.

== Release ==
The film's North American premiere was at the Fright Night Film Fest of July 2010 in Louisville, Kentucky. The film was released in the United States by Lionsgate in January 2012.

== Reception ==
Bob Calhoun of Salon.com wrote that Sorbo "sinks to sad new lows" after starring in the film.

Scott Weinberg of Twitch Film called it "one of the worst films I've ever seen". Weinberg said that it is "the sort of movie that makes you reconsider Uwe Boll's status as the reigning king of movie crap".

eFilm critic Jack Sommersby rated the film one star and said: "What's infuriating is that Pyun has oodles of talent and can be a first-rate director when he allows himself to be guided by ratiocination rather than egregious grandeur. The Sword and the Sorcerer didn't exactly have the sturdiest of scripts, which resulted in a lumpy middle section, but it was all of a piece, a consistent vision—for my money, far better than John Boorman's clunky Excalibur from the year before". Nick Hartel of DVD Talk rated it 0/5 stars and also called Pyun worse than Boll, whom he called merely lazy rather than incompetent like Pyun.

Scott Pyle of Fulvue Drive-In.com writes: "Empire tries very hard to follow the happy-go-lucky spirit of its predecessor, and it manages to succeed at this on some level, but it lacks the innocence and pure fun of Sorcerer". David Johnson of DVD Verdict wrote that the film's only redeeming quality is that it is "laughably short".

Giving the film one star, Jason Rugart said: "I fear it will end up on my worst of list next December ... Pyun has an excellent eye for the visually intriguing and his love for the craft palpable. That's the thing that makes Tales such a frustrating viewing experience is that elements of a good movie or at least a watchable one are swimming about in this murky haphazard concoction".
