= Matthew Laurance =

American actor

- Born: Queens, New York City, New York, US
- Notable work: Saturday Night Live, Beverly Hills, 90210

Comedy career
- Years active: 1980–present
- Medium: Actor, comedian

Matthew Laurance is an American actor and comedian best known for starring as Ben Coleman in the Fox sitcom Duet and for his recurring role as Mel Silver on Beverly Hills, 90210.

== Early life, family and education ==
Laurance was born in Queens, New York City and raised in suburban Hewlett, Long Island. He has an identical twin brother, Mitchell (born four minutes earlier), who is also a professional actor. Both brothers are graduates of Tufts University.

== Career ==
Laurance appeared on Saturday Night Live during its sixth season. He left SNL after one season (albeit a short season, with only 13 episodes due to a writer's strike and NBC temporarily shutting down the show due to bad ratings and worse reviews). As of 2026, Matthew Laurance is the only SNL cast member who has an identical twin who worked on the show with him in some capacity (Mitchell made uncredited appearances between 1977 and 1980 and was an associate producer).

Laurance portrayed bass player Sal Amato in the 1983 cult hit Eddie and the Cruisers, and he was the only cast member besides Michael Paré and Michael Antunes to appear in the 1989 sequel, Eddie and the Cruisers II: Eddie Lives! He also had a role in Streets of Fire, as one of the two Ardmore police officers who enter the bus Tom Cody (Michael Paré) was on, making this the third film he appeared in with Paré.

He starred as detective novelist Ben Coleman in the sitcom Duet on Fox, which ran from 1987 to 1989 for three seasons, at the time, one of few original programs during the Fox network's debut. He also appeared on television in thirtysomething.

From 1991 through 2000, he performed the recurring role of Mel Silver, father of David Silver and Erin Silver on Beverly Hills, 90210.

He is currently the host of The Matthew & Jimmy Show on local Lexington, Kentucky’s ESPN Radio 1300am.
