= Gambier, Ohio =

- Village
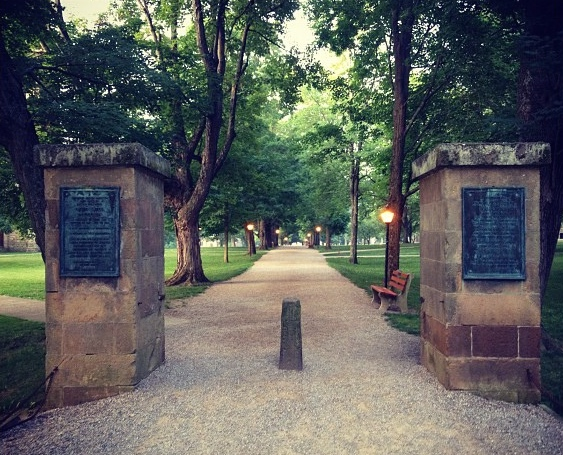
- Middle Path

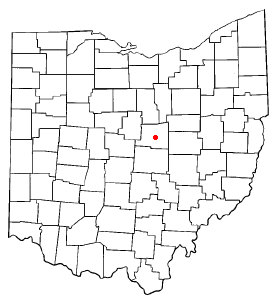
- Location of Gambier, Ohio

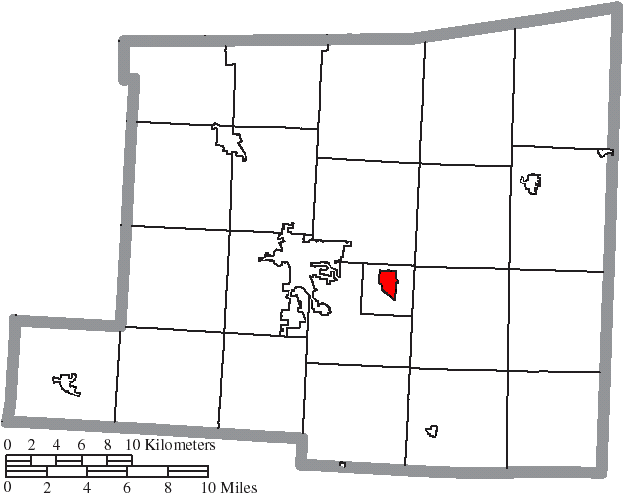
- Location of Gambier in Knox County
- Coordinates: 40°22′20″N 82°23′38″W
- Country: United States
- State: Ohio
- County: Knox
- Township: College
- Founded: 1824
- Incorporated: 1870
- Founder: Philander Chase
- Named for: James Gambier, 1st Baron Gambier

Government
  - Mayor: Leeman Kessler

Area
  - Total: 0.94 sq mi (2.43 km^{2})
  - Land: 0.94 sq mi (2.43 km^{2})
  - Water: 0 sq mi (0.00 km^{2})
- Elevation: 1,056 ft (322 m)

Population (2020)
  - Total: 2,213
  - Estimate (2023): 2,330
  - Density: 2,361.8/sq mi (911.88/km^{2})
- Time zone: UTC-5 (Eastern (EST))
  - Summer (DST): UTC-4 (EDT)
- ZIP code: 43022
- Area code: 740
- FIPS code: 39-29246
- GNIS feature ID: 2398940
- Website: www.villageofgambier.org

Gambier (/ˈɡæm.bɪər/ GAM-beer) is a village and college town in Knox County, Ohio, United States. The population was 2,213 at the 2020 census. It was planned and founded in 1824 along with Kenyon College.

== History ==
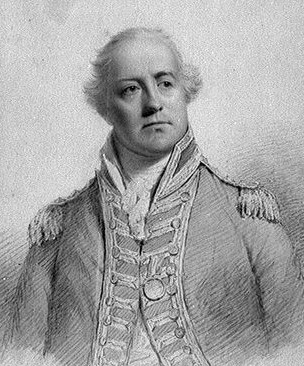
James Gambier, a founding benefactor of Kenyon College

Gambier was laid out in 1824 and incorporated as a village in 1870. The village was named after one of Kenyon College's early benefactors, Lord Gambier.

In the 1960s, Japanese writer Junzo Shono spent several years in Gambier, culminating in the writing of the book A Sojourn in Gambier, which would prove to be quite popular in Japan.

On May 4, 2020, the village of Gambier became the first municipality in Knox County to enact a law which explicitly includes LGBTQ+ people in anti-discrimination legislation. Gambier became the 29th municipality in the state of Ohio to adopt this legislature (as of 2022, there were 34 municipalities and one county with such legislation). The language specifies that no person can be discriminated against on the basis of sexual orientation or gender identity and expression. The decision came to a unanimous vote over the video-chat platform, Zoom, facilitated by the town's mayor, Leeman Kessler. The law is a reflection of the Ohio Fairness Act, a bill currently stalled at the House and the Senate tables.

== Geography ==
Gambier is located along the Kokosing River.

According to the United States Census Bureau, the village has a total area of 0.94 square miles (2.43 km^{2}), all land.

== Demographics ==
Historical population
Census	Pop.	Note	%±
1850	280		—
1860	575		105.4%
1870	581		1.0%
1880	576		−0.9%
1890	660		14.6%
1900	751		13.8%
1910	537		−28.5%
1920	433		−19.4%
1930	498		15.0%
1940	470		−5.6%
1950	1,037		120.6%
1960	1,148		10.7%
1970	1,571		36.8%
1980	2,056		30.9%
1990	2,073		0.8%
2000	1,871		−9.7%
2010	2,391		27.8%
2020	2,213		−7.4%
2023 (est.)	2,330	▲	5.3%
U.S. Decennial Census

=== 2010 census ===
At the 2010 census there were 2,391 people, 343 households, and 126 families living in the village. The population density was 2,543.6 inhabitants per square mile (982.1/km^{2}). There were 375 housing units at an average density of 398.9 per square mile (154.0/km^{2}). The racial makeup of the village was 90.5% White, 2.8% African American, 0.2% Native American, 2.0% Asian, 0.8% from other races, and 3.7% from two or more races. Hispanic or Latino of any race were 2.8%.

Of the 343 households 15.2% had children under the age of 18 living with them, 30.6% were married couples living together, 4.7% had a female householder with no husband present, 1.5% had a male householder with no wife present, and 63.3% were non-families. 33.5% of households were one person and 11.4% were one person aged 65 or older. The average household size was 2.39 and the average family size was 2.76.

The median age in the village was 21.2 years. 4% of residents were under the age of 18; 79.6% were between the ages of 18 and 24; 5.1% were from 25 to 44; 6.7% were from 45 to 64; and 4.5% were 65 or older. The gender makeup of the village was 47.3% male and 52.7% female.

=== 2000 census ===
At the 2000 census there were 1,871 people, 278 households, and 142 families living in the village. The population density was 1,998.5 inhabitants per square mile (771.6/km^{2}). There were 305 housing units at an average density of 325.8 per square mile (125.8/km^{2}). The racial makeup of the village was 94.07% White, 2.51% African American, 1.28% Asian, 0.05% Pacific Islander, 0.43% from other races, and 1.66% from two or more races. Hispanic or Latino of any race were 1.66%.

Of the 278 households 22.3% had children under the age of 18 living with them, 43.9% were married couples living together, 6.5% had a female householder with no husband present, and 48.9% were non-families. 39.9% of households were one person and 12.2% were one person aged 65 or older. The average household size was 2.03 and the average family size was 2.77.

The age distribution was 5.8% under the age of 18, 73.1% from 18 to 24, 7.3% from 25 to 44, 9.0% from 45 to 64, and 4.9% 65 or older. The median age was 21 years. For every 100 females there were 82.7 males. For every 100 females age 18 and over, there were 81.6 males.

The median household income was $51,964 and the median family income was $71,477. Males had a median income of $40,500 versus $29,327 for females. The per capita income for the village was $9,661. About 2.5% of families and 8.0% of the population were below the poverty line, including 5.2% of those under age 18 and 2.6% of those age 65 or over.

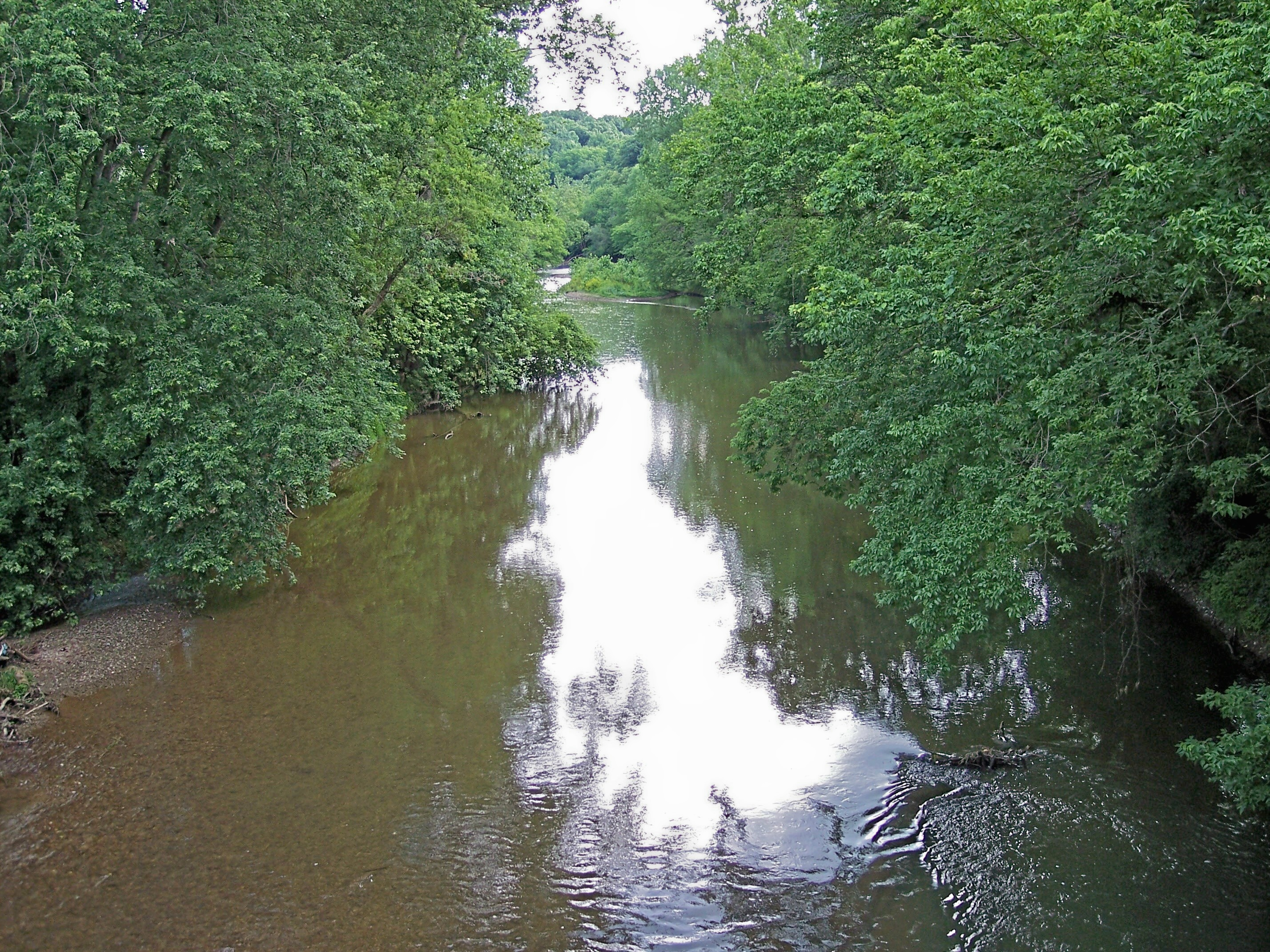
The Kokosing River, a tributary of the Ohio River, flows past Gambier

== Education ==
Mount Vernon City School District operates Wiggin Street Elementary in the village.

Kenyon College, an Episcopal institution, has been in operation in Gambier since 1824.

Gambier has a public library, a branch of The Public Library of Mount Vernon & Knox County.

== Notable people ==
- Margaret L. Bodine, photographer
- Philander Chase, founder of Kenyon College, Episcopal Church Bishop of Ohio and Illinois
- Sean M. Decatur, chemist and former president of Kenyon College
- P. F. Kluge, author of Biggest Elvis: A Novel, resident of Gambier
- Herbert T. Perrin, U.S. Army officer, resident of Gambier
- Joan Slonczewski, biologist, resident of Gambier
