= Midnight Towboy =

- The Simpsons episode
- Episode no.: Season 19; Episode 3
- Directed by: Matthew Nastuk
- Written by: Stephanie Gillis
- Production code: JABF21
- Original air date: October 7, 2007

Guest appearance
- Matt Dillon as Louie

Episode features
- Couch gag: The family is built out of LEGO bricks, in a LEGO living room. Homer is initially built with hair, but it is then removed.
- Commentary: Al Jean; Stephanie Gillis; Matt Selman; Tom Gammill; Max Pross; David Silverman; Violet Jean

Episode chronology
← Previous "The Homer of Seville"	Next → "I Don't Wanna Know Why the Caged Bird Sings"
- The Simpsons season 19

"Midnight Towboy" is the third episode of the nineteenth season of the American animated television series The Simpsons. It first aired on the Fox network in the United States on October 7, 2007, and in the United Kingdom on November 11, 2007. This is the first Simpsons episode to premiere in October since season eleven's "Treehouse of Horror X", which aired on October 31, 1999.

When Homer's car is towed, he meets Louie, a tow truck driver who introduces Homer to the joy of towing cars for a living. Homer soon goes too far, prompting Springfieldians to plot their revenge. Meanwhile, Marge becomes concerned about Maggie's clinginess and hires a counselor to make her independent. This episode was written by Stephanie Gillis, and directed by Matthew Nastuk. Matt Dillon guest stars as Louie.

During its first airing, the episode gained 7.89 million viewers. It received positive reviews.

== Plot ==
Marge discovers that Maggie has become excessively clingy while putting her to bed one night. After Maggie's behavior causes a bottle of milk to fall and break on the kitchen floor, Bart and Lisa help Marge get in touch with Creative Responses for Infant Edu-Loving (CRIE, pronounced as the word "cry"), a group that helps children to be more independent. A CRIE counselor arrives to work with Maggie, ordering Marge to leave her alone in a room. Marge is unnerved by Maggie's crying at first, but Maggie quickly calms down as Marge watches in surprise. Maggie is soon able to climb up into her own high chair and get a book and banana for herself, and Marge is saddened to realize that she is no longer needed.

Meanwhile, Homer drives all over Springfield in search of more milk, to no avail. He finally buys some in the sleazy neighboring city of Guidopolis, which is populated by Italian-American stereotypes, but finds his car being towed away by a man named Louie. Seeing Homer's fascination with towing, Louie unhooks the car and introduces him to the business, but warns him not to work in Guidopolis as it is Louie's territory. Homer begins to tow one car after another in Springfield, angering the residents and prompting them to plan revenge.

The residents plant a car just inside Guidopolis, set it up to appear as if it is parked illegally, and hide the city-limits sign to fool Homer into thinking that it is within Springfield. When he tows the car, they reveal the sign; furious at this trespassing, Louie abducts Homer and locks him in his basement with other tow truck drivers who have run afoul of him.

With Homer gone, the parking situation in Springfield degenerates into pandemonium. After four days, Maggie rides Santa's Little Helper into Guidopolis and frees the drivers by using the hook on Louie's tow truck to rip out the bars on his basement window. Homer returns home with Maggie and the dog, and Marge and Maggie happily reconcile.

== Production ==
The couch gag was created by Assistant Color Designer Mike Battle. He used stop motion animation to create the Simpson family out of Lego.

Matt Dillon guest starred as Louie.

== Cultural references ==
The episode title is a reference to Midnight Cowboy. Louie's trapdoor is activated by a bust of Jon Bon Jovi, à la the 1960s Batman TV show. Homer, Bart, Lisa, Ralph, and Milhouse parody a scene from Animal House, and sing "Shout" in togas. "Mr. T is The Lion King" is seen on a billboard while Homer drives to Guidopolis. Maggie owns a stuffed animal, Justin Timberwolf, a reference to Justin Timberlake. The message in Maggie's blocks is a reference to Homer's "message" in "My Mother the Carjacker".

Homer enthrals the kidnapped drivers by describing the plots of the summer 2007 releases Transformers and Shrek the Third. The kidnapped drivers sing "Under the Boardwalk" by the Drifters. "On the Dark Side" from the movie Eddie and the Cruisers is heard when Homer is driving through Guidopolis. "Cochise" by Audioslave is briefly heard on the radio while Homer is riding with Louie. When Maggie leaves the house through the doggy door on Santa's Little Helper's Back and rides around on him, this is a reference to Toy Story 2.

In one scene, Bart cuts several swear words out of the Bible, stating that since they are in the Bible, he and Milhouse can use them. When Milhouse states that he does not think "Leviticus" is a swear word, Bart replies, "Shut the hell up, you damn-ass-whore!" When Apu mentions that milk, Mentos and lottery ticket scrapings are being used as jet fuel it is an allusion to the Diet Coke and Mentos eruption. Louie is dressed similarly to Steve Randle (played by Tom Cruise) from the movie The Outsiders, which starred Matt Dillon.

== Reception ==
The episode earned a 2.8 rating and was watched by 7.89 million viewers, which was the 55th most-watched show that week.

Robert Canning of IGN gave the episode 7.4/10, better than each of the previous two episodes, calling it a "solid, funny episode". He felt that the "odd scene involving the Duff blimp, the Sea Captain's pirate ship and a train engine driving through the streets was simply too ridiculous not to be funny."

Richard Keller of TV Squad called it a "decent, strong episode" that had many laughs and enjoyed the episode's subplot with Marge and Maggie and enjoyed the scene where Marge struggled with the computer.
