= Tough All Over =

Tough All Over may refer to:

- Tough All Over (John Cafferty & The Beaver Brown Band album), 1985
  - "Tough All Over" (song), a 1985 song by John Cafferty and the Beaver Brown Band
- Tough All Over (Shelby Lynne album), 1990
  - "Things Are Tough All Over" (song), this album's title track
- Tough All Over (Gary Allan album), 2005, or its title track
