= Eddie and the Cruisers II: Eddie Lives! =

1989 film by Jean-Claude Lord

- Directed by: Jean-Claude Lord
- Written by: Charles Zev Cohen; Rick Doehring
- Produced by: William Stuart; Denis Heroux; Stephane Reichel
- Starring: Michael Paré; Marina Orsini; Bernie Coulson; Matthew Laurance
- Cinematography: René Verzier
- Music by: John Cafferty; Marty Simon; Kenny Vance; Leon Aronson
- Production company: Aurora Productions
- Distributed by: Scotti Brothers
- Release date: August 18, 1989
- Running time: 104 minutes
- Countries: Canada; United States
- Language: English
- Budget: Can$9 million
- Box office: $536,508

Eddie and the Cruisers II: Eddie Lives! is the 1989 sequel to the 1983 film Eddie and the Cruisers. It is directed by Jean-Claude Lord, and based on literary characters created by author P. F. Kluge. Michael Paré and Matthew Laurance reprise their roles as Eddie Wilson and Sal Amato, respectively. The film was marketed with the tagline "The legend. The music. The man."

Director Lord and several members of the film's supporting cast (Marina Orsini, Vlasta Vrána, and Mark Brennan) had previously worked together on the French-Canadian television series Lance et Compte. Additionally, cast members Harvey Atkin and Kate Lynch had earlier co-starred in the comedy film Meatballs (1979).

== Plot ==
Satin Records rejected rock and roll band Eddie and the Cruisers' last album A Season in Hell 20 years earlier. Now Satin launches an "Eddie Lives!" campaign to make more money off Eddie's image as a publicity stunt, despite their belief that Eddie is dead. The record label re-releases the band's first album, which becomes an even bigger hit than its original release. The "lost recordings" from Season in Hell that were discovered are released and become a major hit album.

A mystery demo tape—proved by a voice expert to feature Eddie Wilson playing on it and that may or may not have been recorded after Eddie "died"—is discovered by the record company—which adds this discovery to the "Eddie Lives!" campaign.

Meanwhile, Eddie Wilson is actually alive, having slipped away from the car crash and started a new life under an assumed name. The spotlight on his supposed death angers Eddie, who now resides in Canada as construction worker Joe West.

Eddie gets involved with a struggling bar band, and his passion for music resurfaces. Eddie (as Joe West) challenges the band's talent, accepts an invitation to play, and dazzles the audience and the band's members. He fights his personal demons amidst the band's rising success as Rock Solid begins to tour and win fans.

During the tour, Eddie, still known to his band as Joe, has more frequent flashbacks to his former life. His anger and pride peak when lead guitarist Rick Diesel calls a woman they met at gig who wants the band to audition for a music festival. Eddie agrees to do the large public performance, under the condition that they lock themselves away in a cabin, where there are "no distractions" so they can get back to the music. The band begins to lose its focus and Eddie's wrath explodes. He smashes his guitar and storms off, determined never to play again.

Saxophonist Hilton confronts him at a fire outside the cabin, where Eddie is burning his songs. Hilton then reveals that he knew Eddie's true identity after hearing him play for the first time. He suggests that Eddie has no destiny but musician Eddie Wilson, and not Joe West, construction worker. When Eddie resists, Hilton reminds him that while he had his shot at success years ago, this may be the only shot for his new band and that Eddie owes them that opportunity. Eddie relents and rejoins the band.

Satin Records has been upping the ante for anyone who can provide proof that Eddie lives, after an expert proved that legendary Bo Diddley had played on the mystery tapes before the death of Cruisers sax player Wendell Newton and Eddie's presumed demise in the river. In seclusion for over a month, Rick is unaware of the mounting tension around the mystery of Eddie's whereabouts. He decides to send a tape to Satin Records with a note that contains the line, "I have a band and my lead singer sure sounds a lot like Eddie Wilson."

The band auditions for the music festival and wins a spot in it. Eddie's doubts return. In desperation, he reveals the truth to his girlfriend Diane, who encourages him to just play, whether as Joe West or Eddie Wilson. He then turns to his longtime friend and confidant Sal Amato. Sal and Eddie meet and hash out 20 years of anger and grief. Sal demands to know where these "so-called-mystery tapes were recorded". Eddie takes Sal back to the old abandoned church where in 1963, he and Wendell had a jam session with a large group of black musicians, including Bo Diddley. Eddie confesses that the whole affair, combined with what seemed to be a lukewarm reaction from the industry, made him feel inadequate. Sal tells Eddie it's not about setting the world on fire, it's about playing the music. Eddie returns to Montreal, ready to play the festival.

Meanwhile, someone tells the "Eddie Lives!" campaign of Wendell's presence on the mystery tape—publicly establishing that it was recorded prior to Eddie's apparent death and that the idea that Eddie Wilson is alive is still unproven. However, in Canada, Eddie's new band is about to take the stage when Rick's earlier ploy pays off. Satin Records' two executives recognize Eddie. Confronted by one of the two men who once told him his music was unsuitable for release, Eddie runs out to his car. Diane runs after him and convinces him that although the world will discover who Joe West really is tomorrow, Eddie can still claim today for himself. Eddie takes the stage and is caught up by the thrill of performing live again. He introduces his bandmates, then proclaims, "I'm Eddie Wilson.” The band launches into their next song as the ending credits roll.

== Cast ==
- Michael Paré as Eddie Wilson / Joe West
- Michael "Tunes" Antunes as Wendell Newton
- Marina Orsini as Dianne Armani
- Bernie Coulson as Rick Diesel
- Matthew Laurance as Sal Amato
- Anthony Sherwood as Hilton Overstreet
- David Matheson as Stewart Fairbanks
- Mark Holmes as Quinn Quinley
- Harvey Atkin as Lew Eisen
- Paul Markle as "Sexy" Charlie Tanzie
- Kate Lynch as Lyndsay Caputo
- Elizabeth MacRae as a news reporter #3

Special guest appearances by:

- Larry King
- Martha Quinn
- Bo Diddley

== Production ==
The film was quickly made in just over 30 days from March to mid-April 1989. The concert scenes for the finale and Eddie Wilson (Michael Paré)'s big return onstage were filmed on April 24, 1989 in Paradise, Nevada at the Thomas & Mack Center in between sets of Bon Jovi's headlining New Jersey Syndicate Tour (after Skid Row's opening set) concert. The crew also filmed concert scenes during the tour's two-night stop at the Forum in Los Angeles.

== Release and reception ==
The film was released on only 402 screens nationwide on the weekend of August 18, 1989, just grossing $536,508. It was then quickly pulled from theaters by Aurora Productions.

Writing in the Chicago Tribune, critic Dave Kehr criticized the film as existing "less as a real movie than an extended promotional film for a new album, also by John Cafferty and his band...the sequel amounts to little more than a commercial with an admission charge." Kehr also wrote that "early on, Eddie II achieves that plodding, joyless, half-hearted tone that is characteristic of Canadian cinema at its most depressive, and director Jean-Claude Lord (whose previous work includes The Vindicator and Cover Girls) doesn't help matters by filming such scintillating dialogue exchanges as 'You wouldn't understand'/'Try me' with a perfectly straight face. Intended as dark and broody, Paré's Eddie comes across as a surly grouch whose supposed reclusiveness is not born out by the gyrating exhibitionism of his stage manner. As for John Cafferty's music obligingly lip-synched by Paré, it still sounds a lot like Springsteen, only without the grain of experience."

== Soundtrack release ==
The soundtrack was released on August 18, 1989 by Scotti Brothers Records, which reached #121 on the US Billboard 200 chart. The lead single "Pride and Passion" by John Cafferty and the Beaver Brown Band peaked at #66 on the Billboard Hot 100.

== Video releases ==
The film was released on VHS and videodisc in the United States on January 18, 1990. The DVD was released in 1998, then in 2008 as a combo pack with the first film Eddie and the Cruisers. Shout! Factory released both films as a Blu-ray exclusive on April 14, 2015.
