= C-I-T-Y =

Single by John Cafferty and the Beaver Brown Band

from the album Tough All Over
- B-side: "Where the Action Is"
- Released: July 1985
- Genre: Synthpop, heartland rock, pop rock
- Length: 3:33
- Label: Scotti Bros.
- Songwriter: John Cafferty
- Producer: Kenny Vance

John Cafferty and the Beaver Brown Band singles chronology
"Tough All Over" (1985)	"C-I-T-Y" (1985)	"Small Town Girl" (1985)

"C-I-T-Y" is a song by American rock band John Cafferty and the Beaver Brown Band. Written by frontman John Cafferty, it was released in 1985 as the second single from their second studio album Tough All Over. Following the success of the top ten hit, "On the Dark Side", from the previous year, the single entered the Billboard Hot 100 on August 10, 1985, at number 65. It would ultimately climb to number 18 on October 5 of that year where it spent one week in that position. The single was also a major success on the US Mainstream Rock chart, where it peaked at number 9. Meanwhile, on the US Cash Box Top 100, it peaked at number 20 on October 12, 1985, where it spent one week.

== Track listing ==
US 7" single

1. "C-I-T-Y" - 3:33
2. "Where the Action Is" - 2:52

== Chart performance ==
Chart (1985)	Peak position
Canada Top Singles (RPM)	30
US Billboard Hot 100	18
US Mainstream Rock (Billboard)	9
US Cash Box Top 100	20
