= Palace of Depression =

Building made of junk in New Jersey

Coordinates: 39.4843°N 75.0614°W

The Palace of Depression (or Palace Depression) was a building made of junk that was located in Vineland, New Jersey, built by eccentric George Daynor and his wife Florence Street Daynor. He claimed to be a former Alaska gold miner who lost his fortune in the Wall Street crash of 1929. This amusement was known as "The Strangest House in the World" and the "Home of Junk", built as a testament of willpower against the effects of The Great Depression.

== History ==
=== Beginnings ===
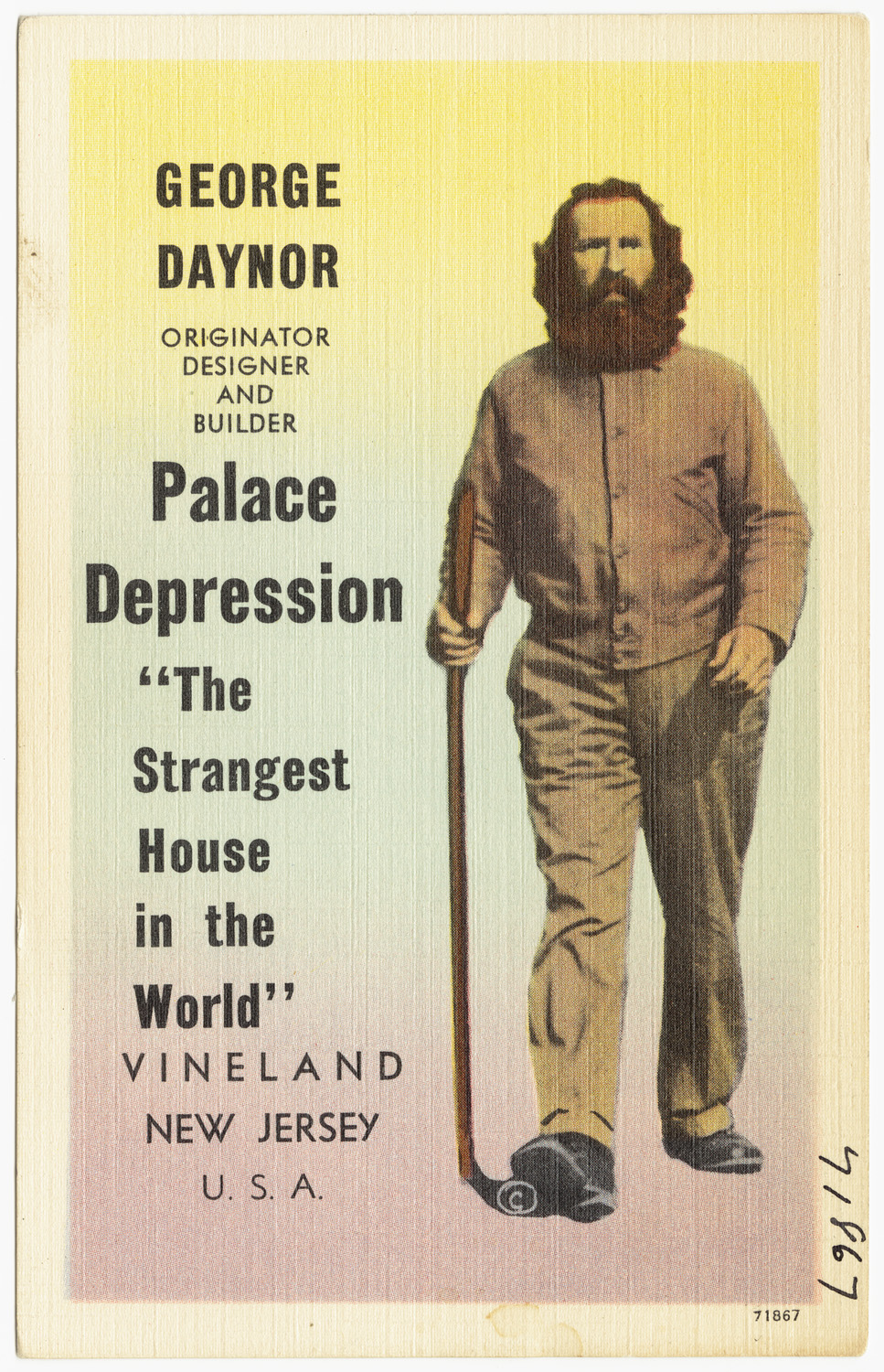
Postcard showing Mr. Daynor

George Daynor claims that he was guided to New Jersey by an angel who provided the design for the palace. The palace was completed on Christmas Day 1932, built on 4 acres (16,000 m^{2}) which cost him four dollars. Daynor said that his palace was "the greatest piece of originality ever brought about in the history of Man." He would charge 25 cents for a tour.

Daynor was a publicity seeker who claimed to be "the most photographed man in the world." Peter Weinberger was kidnapped on July 4, 1956, (Note: Peter Weinberger, born June 6, 1956, son of Morris and Beatrice Ziefman Weinberger, was kidnapped when 33 days old on July 4, 1956, from his home at 17 Albemarle Road, Westbury, Long Island, and left to die near Northern State Parkway in Plainview, Long Island. His body was discovered in a thicket on August 24, 1956. Angelo John LaMarca confessed to the kidnapping and was executed at Sing Sing on August 7, 1958.) and Daynor called the FBI and falsely reported that the kidnappers had visited the palace. The FBI followed the false claim and Daynor was imprisoned for a year.

The Palace of Depression was also linked with the disappearance of William Ebeneezer Jones III, who went missing in 1962. The grounds of the Palace of Depression were dug up, but no body was ever found. (Note: Three-year-old William "Billy" Jones was reported missing from his home in Vineland, New Jersey on December 17, 1962.)

=== Decline ===
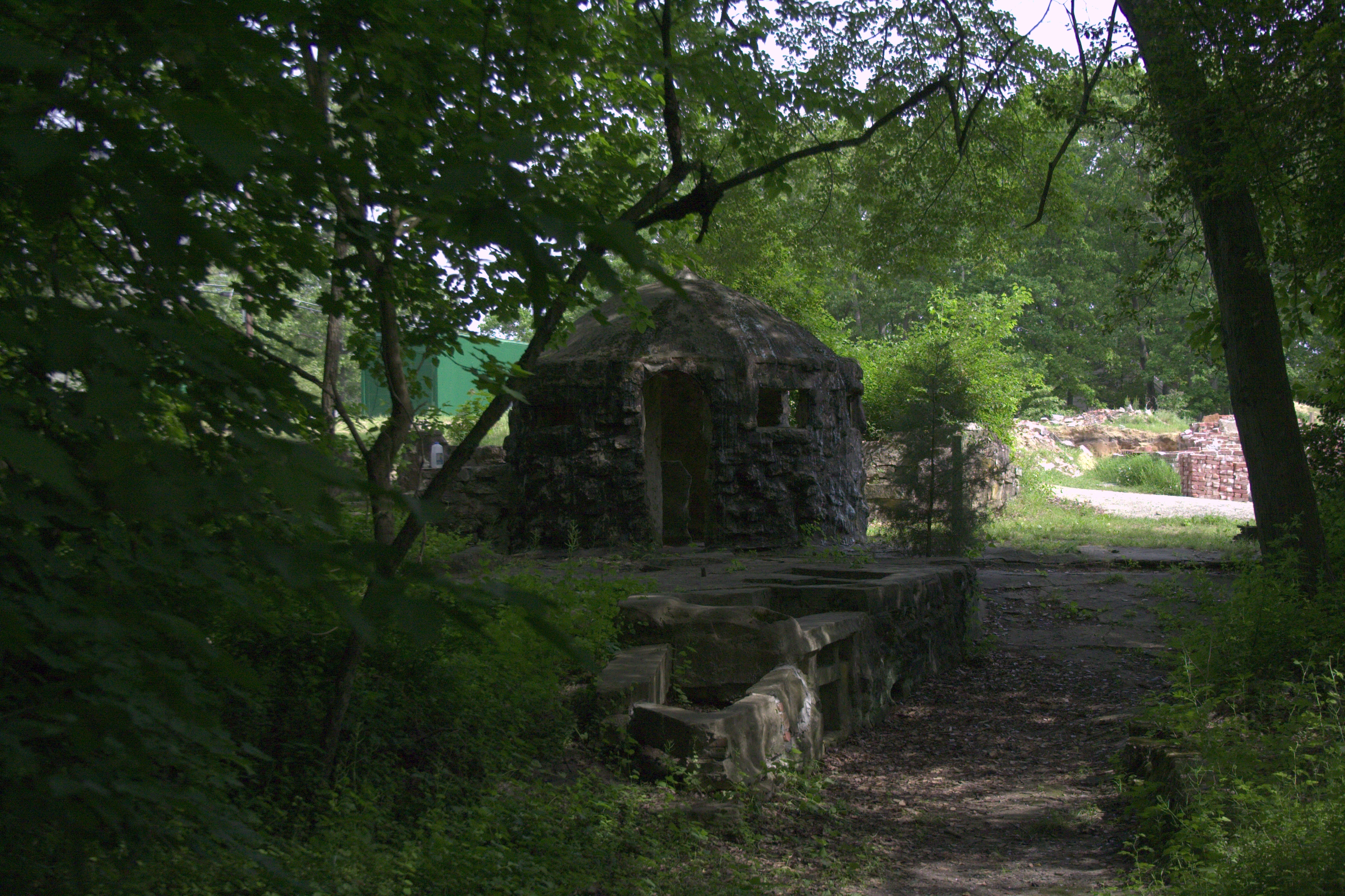
A picture of the ticket booth, the last remnant of the original structure

Daynor died a pauper in 1964 at a reported 104 years old. After Daynor's death, a fire destroyed the Palace of Depression and Vineland razed it in 1969.

=== Restoration ===
As of 2001, a city restoration project to rebuild the Palace of Depression was in progress. Local companies and individuals were encouraged to volunteer materials and labor. Kevin Kirchner initially started the effort in 1998 and has led the restoration effort since its beginning. It took about three years just to obtain the permits and clear the wooded property before actual re-construction of The Palace began in 2001.

Kirchner and his son, Kristian, raised money and worked with a team of volunteers to rebuild it. Kevin died in December 2021 from COVID-19; his son died the following year from complications due to leukemia. They never got to officially open the grounds and welcome tourists.
