= Aurora Productions, Hollywood =

American film production company (1978–1990)

- Company type: Film Production Company
- Industry: Films
- Founded: 1978
- Founders: Rich Irvine; James L. Stewart
- Defunct: 1990
- Fate: Closed
- Headquarters: Hollywood, California, U.S.
- Products: Film

Aurora Productions was a film production company established in Hollywood, California in 1978 by former executives of The Walt Disney Company Rich Irvine and James L. Stewart. It became defunct in 1990.

== Films ==
#	Title	Release date	Budget	Gross	RT	Notes
1	The Secret of NIMH	July 2, 1982	$7 million	$14.7 million	96%	co-production with Don Bluth Productions
2	Heart Like a Wheel	April 1, 1983	$7.5 million	$272,278	100%	
3	Eddie and the Cruisers	September 23, 1983	$5 million	$4.8 million	36%	
4	Maxie	September 27, 1985	$7 million	$2.6 million	N/A	
5	Eddie and the Cruisers II: Eddie Lives!	August 18, 1989	$5 million	$536,000	N/A	
6	Side Out	March 30, 1990	$6 million	$450,000	N/A	Final film
