= Tough All Over (John Cafferty & The Beaver Brown Band album) =

Studio album by John Cafferty and the Beaver Brown Band
- Released: February 1985
- Genre: Rock, heartland rock
- Label: Scotti Bros.
- Producer: Kenny Vance

John Cafferty and the Beaver Brown Band chronology
Eddie and the Cruisers (1983)	Tough All Over (1985)	Roadhouse (1988)

Alternate cover
- Eddie and the Cruisers re-release cover

Professional ratings
Review scores
Source	Rating
AllMusic	3/5 stars
The Encyclopedia of Popular Music	2/5 stars
MusicHound Rock: The Essential Album Guide	1/5 stars
The Rolling Stone Album Guide	1/5 stars

Tough All Over is the debut studio album by American rock band John Cafferty and the Beaver Brown Band, released in 1985.

It was Cafferty's first attempt to pull his band away from the Eddie and the Cruisers franchise; it was later re-released with a different album cover and "The Voice of Eddie and the Cruisers" added to the title.

The album peaked at No. 40 on the Billboard 200.

== Critical reception ==
The Rolling Stone Album Guide deemed Tough All Over "grandiloquent claptrap."

== Track listing ==
All songs written by John Cafferty.

1. "Voice of America's Sons" - 4:35
2. "Tough All Over" - 4:31
3. "C-I-T-Y" - 3:28
4. "Where the Action Is" - 2:52
5. "Dixieland" - 3:55
6. "Strangers in Paradise" - 4:23
7. "Small Town Girl" - 4:14
8. "More Than Just One of the Boys" - 3:17
9. "Tex-Mex (Crystal Blue)" - 4:39

== Singles ==
The album had four singles released from it. "Voice of America's Sons" was released after being included on the soundtrack to the 1986 film Cobra.

- "Tough All Over" (1985) (#22 US, #1 US Rock)
- "C-I-T-Y" (1985) (#18 US)
- "Small Town Girl" (1985) (#64 US)
- "Voice of America's Sons" (1986) (#62 US)

== Personnel ==
- Bass – Pat Lupo
- Drums – Kenny Jo Silva
- Guitar – Gary Gramolini
- Keyboards – Robert Nicholas Cotoia
- Saxophone – Michael Antunes
- Vocals, Rhythm Guitar – John Cafferty
