= Margaret L. Bodine =

- Born: July 27, 1876; Gambier, Ohio
- Died: November 24, 1960 (aged 84); Phoenixville, Pennsylvania
- Occupation(s): Photographer, filmmaker
- Known for: Founded the Lantern and Lens Gild
- Partner: Nina Fisher Lewis
- Relatives: Joseph Lamb Bodine (cousin)

Margaret L. Bodine (July 27, 1876 — November 24, 1960) was an American naturalist, photographer and filmmaker, based in Philadelphia, Pennsylvania. She was founder of the Lantern and Lens Gild, a women's photography club in Philadelphia.

== Early life ==
Margaret Lamb Bodine was born in Gambier, Ohio, the daughter of Rev. William Budd Bodine (1841-1907) and Rachel Alice Allen Bodine (1840-1921). Her father was the president of Kenyon College from 1876 to 1891. Judge Joseph Lamb Bodine was her first cousin; their fathers were brothers. She graduated from Harcourt Place Seminary in Gambier in 1891.

== Career ==
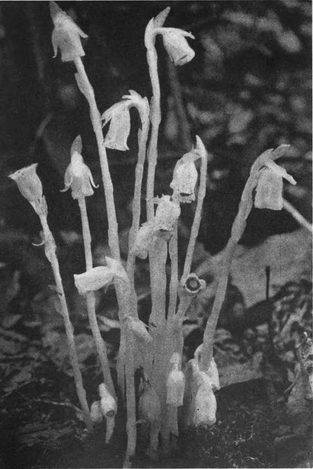
"Indian Pipes", a photograph by Margaret Bodine and Nina Lewis, from a 1909 publication.

In 1905, Bodine was a founder and first president of the Lantern and Lens Gild, a club for women photographers, which grew out of Mathilde Weil's photography classes for women at Drexel University. Bodine and Nina Fisher Lewis shared first prize for a botanical photograph, second prize for an interior photograph, and second prize for a portrait, at the guild's first annual exhibition in 1913.

Bodine photographed plants and animals, especially hummingbirds, finches, and flying squirrels, during summers in Northeast Harbor, Maine, and made documentary films about them. She wrote in detail about the equipment she used and the challenges she faced in this work. "I know of no branch of picture-taking more interesting than this special kind," she said of her work, adding that "there is infinite variety in it, sufficient difficulties to make it absorbing, and a very large proportion of rewarding results."

Bodine was a member of the Amateur Motion Picture Club of America of Philadelphia. Films by Bodine included Humming-birds (1931), Ruby-Throated Humming-bird (1931). Bodine wrote articles about her work, including "Adventures in Taming Wild Birds at Birdbank" (1923), and "Holiday with Humming Birds" (1928) for National Geographic magazine. The latter article described rigging bottles of sweet liquid disguised as flowers to attract hummingbirds, and inspired the creation of blown-glass hummingbird feeders by Laurence and May Rogers Webster, soon after.

Bodine spoke to the Woman's City Club in 1925, the national conference of the National Audubon Society in 1930, and to a meeting of the Geographical Society of Philadelphia in 1939.

== Personal life ==
Margaret L. Bodine and Nina Fisher Lewis worked and lived together for over 40 years, until Lewis's death in 1948. Bodine received a life income from Lewis's estate, "in partial appreciation of her long friendship, devotion, and companionship." She died in 1960, aged 84 years, in Phoenixville, Pennsylvania.
