= 9 Windows =

2024 crime horror film directed by Lou Simon

- Theatrical release poster
- Directed by: Lou Simon
- Written by: Lou Simon
- Produced by: Bryce DiCristofalo; Lou Simon; Todd Slater
- Starring: William Forsythe; Diana Garle; Jason Hignite; Christopher Millan; Michael Paré
- Cinematography: Mauricio Vega
- Music by: Michael Damon
- Production companies: White Lotus Production; Brick Lane Entertainment
- Distributed by: Gravitas Ventures
- Release date: October 15, 2024
- Running time: 82 minutes
- Country: United States
- Language: English

9 Windows is a 2024 screenlife crime horror film written and directed by Lou Simon. It is a modern re-telling of Alfred Hitchcock's 1954 mystery thriller film Rear Window. It stars William Forsythe, Diana Garle, Jason Hignite, Christopher Millan, Michael Paré.

== Plot ==
Liza, a recent graduate in Law and Information Technology, is on the cusp of joining the FBI. On the day of her graduation, she and her parents are en route to a celebratory dinner when tragedy strikes, a truck collides with their car, killing her parents and leaving Liza paralyzed from the waist down. Eighteen months later, Liza lives alone, grappling with survivor's guilt and depression. Her only regular human contact is with Jeff, her physical therapist, who visits her for sessions aimed at improving her mobility and mental well-being.

Isolated and emotionally numb, Liza spends her days trolling vloggers on a local website, a coping mechanism that allows her to vent her frustrations anonymously. One night, during her routine online browsing, she stumbles upon a disturbing live stream, a man setting a dog on fire. Horrified, she reports the incident to the police, but Detective Tim Boyle dismisses it as a misdemeanor, citing the lack of evidence since the user has deleted the account.

Undeterred, Liza continues to monitor the website. Soon, more videos surface, each more gruesome than the last, depicting human murders that mimic the methods of infamous serial killers. In one particularly harrowing video, the killer uses a power drill to murder a victim, a scene that Liza manages to record. Recognizing the severity of the situation, Detective Boyle brings in retired FBI Agent Larry Thurgood to assist in the investigation.

As the investigation unfolds, Liza becomes increasingly involved, using her tech skills to analyze the videos. She notices a fleeting reflection of the killer's face on the blade of a knife in one of the recordings, a clue that leads to the identification of the murderer. However, this breakthrough places Liza in grave danger, as the killer becomes aware of her involvement and targets her as his next victim.

Liza as a wheelchair user, must rely on her wits and determination to survive.

== Cast ==
- William Forsythe as Detective Tim Boyle
- Diana Garle as Liza
- Jason Hignite as Male Figure
- Christopher Millan as Jeff Barrios
- Michael Paré as Agent Larry Thurgood
- Denise Gossett as Holly
- Anton Simone as Fred
- Jovan Hayes as Ms. Lonely
- Dana Anderwald as Tamsim
- Rosemary Gilmore as Victim #2
- Sean Orenstein as Victim #1
- Dwight Stewart II as Victim #3
- Melissa Kunnap as Sex Therapist Wife
- Chris Levine as Shirtless Chef
- Megan Rosen as Miss Body
- Brian Ashton Smith as Sex Therapist Husband
- Julie Snyder as Newscaster

== Release ==
Gravitas Ventures acquired the North American distribution rights of the film.

The film was released on October 15, 2024, in digital and cable VOD and has a limited release on November 14, 2024.
