= I Don't Wanna Know Why the Caged Bird Sings =

- The Simpsons episode
- Episode no.: Season 19; Episode 4
- Directed by: Bob Anderson
- Written by: Dana Gould
- Production code: JABF19
- Original air date: October 14, 2007

Guest appearances
- Steve Buscemi as Dwight; Julia Louis-Dreyfus as Gloria; Ted Nugent as himself

Episode features
- Chalkboard gag: "I am not an FDIC-insured bank"
- Couch gag: Homer, Marge, Bart and Lisa sit on the couch, then the scene expands and shows Maggie playing with a doll house. She picks up Homer and replaces him as her pacifier.
- Commentary: Al Jean; Dana Gould; Ian Maxtone-Graham; Matt Selman; Tom Gammill; Max Pross; David Silverman

Episode chronology
← Previous "Midnight Towboy"	Next → "Treehouse of Horror XVIII"
- The Simpsons season 19

"I Don't Wanna Know Why the Caged Bird Sings" is the fourth episode of the nineteenth season of the American animated television series The Simpsons. It first aired on the Fox network in the United States on October 14, 2007. For the second time in the series, Marge helps a prison assailant. Marge meets Dwight (Steve Buscemi), a man who attempts to rob the bank the two are in. Marge promises that she would visit him in prison, should he turn himself in, but too frightened to go into the prison, she breaks her promise. It was written by Dana Gould and directed by Bob Anderson. Steve Buscemi makes his second guest appearance on the show, (originally appearing as himself in "Brake My Wife, Please") though this time he voiced a character, Dwight. Ted Nugent has a voice cameo. Julia Louis-Dreyfus makes a surprise guest return as Snake's girlfriend Gloria, who originally appeared in "A Hunka Hunka Burns in Love". During its first airing, the episode originally garnered 8.7 million viewers, higher than the previous episode.

== Plot ==
Lisa is named "Student of the Millennium", so Marge stresses that Homer has to attend her ceremony due to past absences at most of the kids' events. Homer then wakes up early and takes Maggie to the school auditorium. Meanwhile, Marge gets impatient waiting in line at the bank, so she strikes up a conversation with an apparently charming man named Dwight (Steve Buscemi), who then pulls out a gun and tells everyone to get down on the floor, holding the entire bank hostage. Marge privately calls Homer, informing him she is a hostage at a bank robbery. Dwight sees this and cuts off the call. He then makes a deal; he will turn himself in if Marge promises to visit him in prison, to which she reluctantly agrees.

Homer attempts to convince Marge not to visit Dwight in the prison, but Marge wishes to honor her promise. However, while going to the prison, she makes continuous stops to avoid going to the prison and misses visiting hours. At the prison, Dwight becomes depressed and then angry at Marge's absence, and Marge's guilt begins to get to her while watching a depressing movie about a prisoner who was to be electrocuted. Dwight breaks out of prison, and upon finding Marge's address in a newspaper, sets out to find her.

While watching television at home, Marge sees a news report by Kent Brockman on Dwight's escape from prison. Dwight begins stalking her in various places, and successfully catches up to Marge and takes her to the same amusement park where he was abandoned by his mother, with the intention to have Marge help him repay the time he had lost, and promises to let her go afterward, to which a sympathetic Marge agrees. He and Marge then ride the Viking ship ride together. Chief Wiggum arrives attempting to save Marge, but he is caught in the ride. Dwight jams the ride's gears by throwing in his own body to save Wiggum (referencing The Brave Little Toaster). He survives, and returns to prison after recovering. Back at the prison, Marge finally visits Dwight, who gives her a flattened dandelion encased in a bar of soap he had carved for her with a message on the back intending to recruit her in helping him attempt another prison break, to which she declines.

== Production ==
American musician and political activist Ted Nugent, who is an advocate of hunting and gun ownership rights, guest starred in the episode as himself. His voice is heard during a phone call urging voters to vote no on a proposition that would make crossbows illegal in public schools. He adds: "If we outlaw crossbows, who's gonna protect our children from charging elk?"

== Cultural references ==
The title of this episode is a take-off of the 1969 autobiography I Know Why the Caged Bird Sings by Maya Angelou. Dwight's buggy eyes is a reference to his guest voice actor's Steve Buscemi's eyes. Homer reveals he works on a Superman novel. Agnes quotes that Dwight and his partner are "Johnny and Clyde", a take on Bonnie and Clyde. Chief Wiggum watches The Negotiator on a portable DVD player to learn how to deal with a hostage situation. The Itchy & Scratchy episode "The Un-Natural" parodies the baseball steroids scandal, and the title references the book and film The Natural. Dwight escapes from jail like Andy Dufresne did in The Shawshank Redemption. After the escape it looks like Dwight steps on the camera, which is a reference to Robert De Niro who steps to the camera after his release from jail in the film Cape Fear. Dr. Hibbert and Krusty, who meet up at the end, reference the earlier hostage scene, off-hand implying The Nine. "Dilbert's Flying Cubicle" (with the theme music from the Dilbert animated series), "Tilt N' Spew", "Mr. Frog's Mild Ride", "FedEx Presents: The Bathroom" and "It's a Long Line" are seen at the amusement park, references to famous and well-known rides, comics, companies, and chains. Dwight's partner in the robbery is based on John Cazale and his character in the movie Dog Day Afternoon which also involved a hostage situation. When Marge visited Dwight in prison Homer was among three Aryan Brotherhood members and called them the three amigos. The song "Who Can It Be Now?" by the Australian group Men at Work plays when Dwight stalks Marge.

== Reception ==
The episode earned a 3.0 rating and was watched by 8.7 million viewers, which was the 39th most-watched show that week.

Robert Canning of IGN enjoyed Buscemi's appearance, and he particularly enjoyed the scene where the funhouse mirror ballooned Buscemi's eyes to a "hilarious extreme"; he also felt Buscemi's voice was the first guest voice of the season to have been used to its fullest potential. Despite the humor of the episode, he also stated the ending of the episode did indeed falter a bit at the end and felt it could not deliver as many laughs as everything that came before it. This episode was also one of two episodes he enjoyed this season, the other being "Midnight Towboy".

Richard Keller of TV Squad thought the episode was "funny and focused well on Marge" but wondered why Bart and Lisa have been largely absent this season. He highlighted the performance by Buscemi and was not aware that Julia Louis-Dreyfus had guest starred.
