= Mathilde Weil =

American photographer (1872–1942)

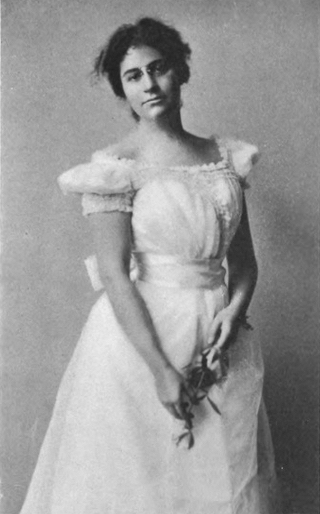
Mathilde Weil as photographed by Eva Watson-Schütze, from a 1899 publication.

Mathilde Weil (January 1872 — June 1942) was an American editor, literary agent, and portrait photographer based in Philadelphia, Pennsylvania.

== Early life ==
Mathilde Weil was from Philadelphia, the daughter of Edward Henry Weil and Isabel R. Lyons Weil. Her parents were Jewish; her father was a lawyer. One of her first cousins, Nathalie Fontaine Lyons, married tobacco executive Bowman Gray Sr.

She attended Mr. and Mrs. L. M. Johnson's School. She graduated from Bryn Mawr College in the class of 1892, with further studies at the Philadelphia Museum of Industrial Art and Textile School (now known as University of the Arts), and a summer course with painter Joseph DeCamp at Annisquam, Massachusetts.

== Career ==
From 1893 to 1896, Weil worked as an editor and reader at Macmillan publishing house. From 1895 to 1896 she was "sub-editor" of the American Historical Review.

Weil acquired a camera in about 1896 and soon became a portrait photographer. She had a studio, but specialized in "home portraiture", or making portraits in the subjects' homes or gardens. Her equipment "comfortably fills an ordinary leather suitcase", marveled one trade magazine in 1915. She published a small guide, "Outdoor Portraiture", detailing her methods.

In 1898 her "Rosa Rosarum" portrait was included in the first Philadelphia Photographic Salon, a juried show organized by Alfred Stieglitz. The following year, she was represented in the Salon by five works, and in 1900 by one work. In 1901, she showed work in the Glasgow International Exhibition, and was featured in Ladies' Home Journal, in a series of features on American women photographers edited by Frances Benjamin Johnston. Weil won a medal from the Royal Photographic Society for her work. From 1905 to 1909, she lectured on photography at the Drexel Institute, and mentored the Drexel Camera Club, later the Lantern and Lens Gild of Women Photographers. Nature photographer and filmmaker Margaret L. Bodine attended Weil's lectures and was founder and president of the Gild. She exhibited some of her portraits of prominent Philadelphians (including Agnes Repplier, Margaret Deland, and Violet Oakley) in Harrisburg, Pennsylvania in 1916. She was an officer of The Plastic Club.

Weil left Philadelphia and photography by 1920, returning to the publishing industry as a literary agent in New York, and eventually moving to San Francisco, California.

== Later life ==
Weil died in Philadelphia in 1942, aged 70 years. Works by Weil were featured in a 1982 show, "Women Look at Women", at UCLA's Frederick S. Wight Art Gallery.

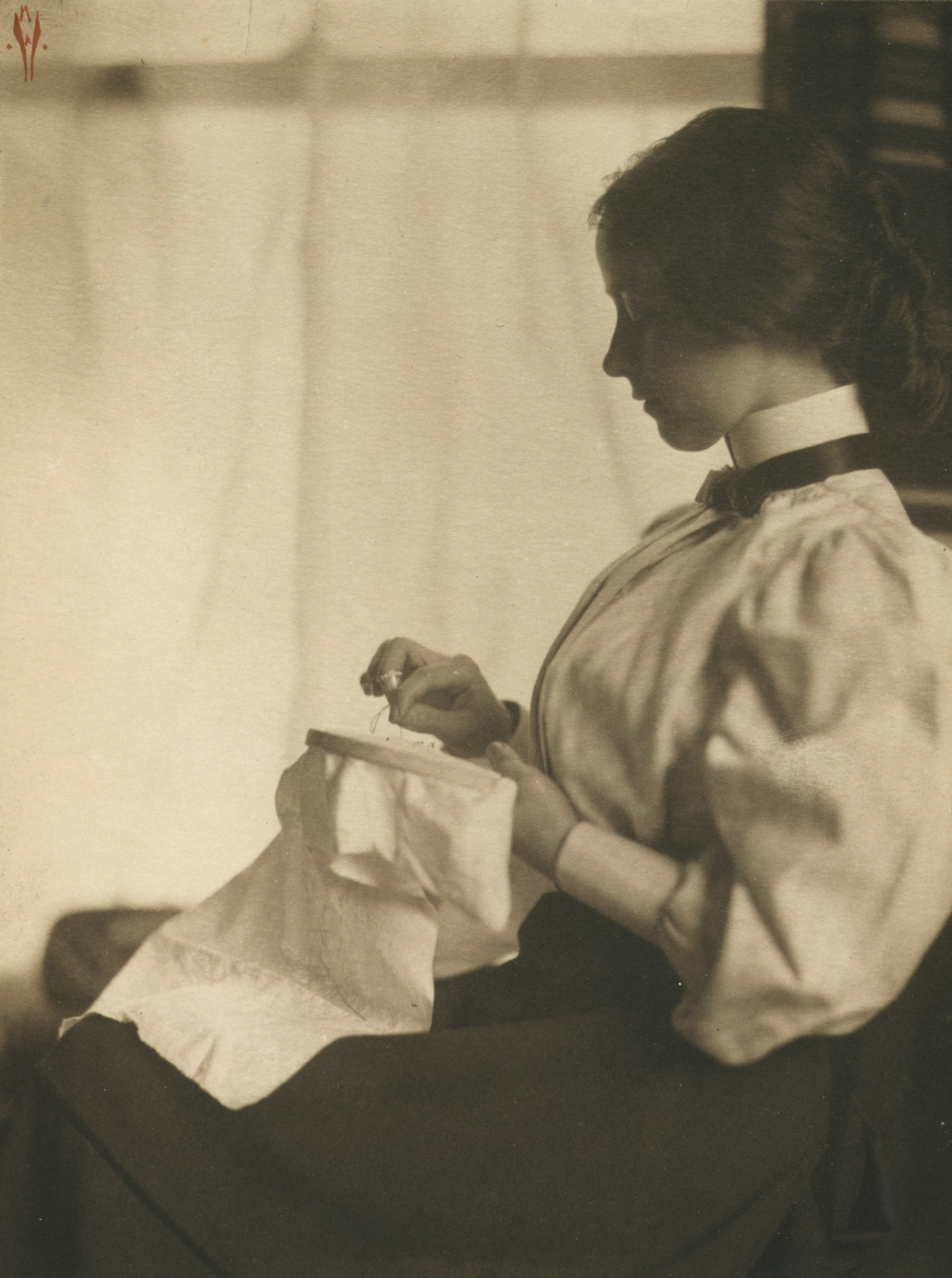
The Embroidery Frame, 1899

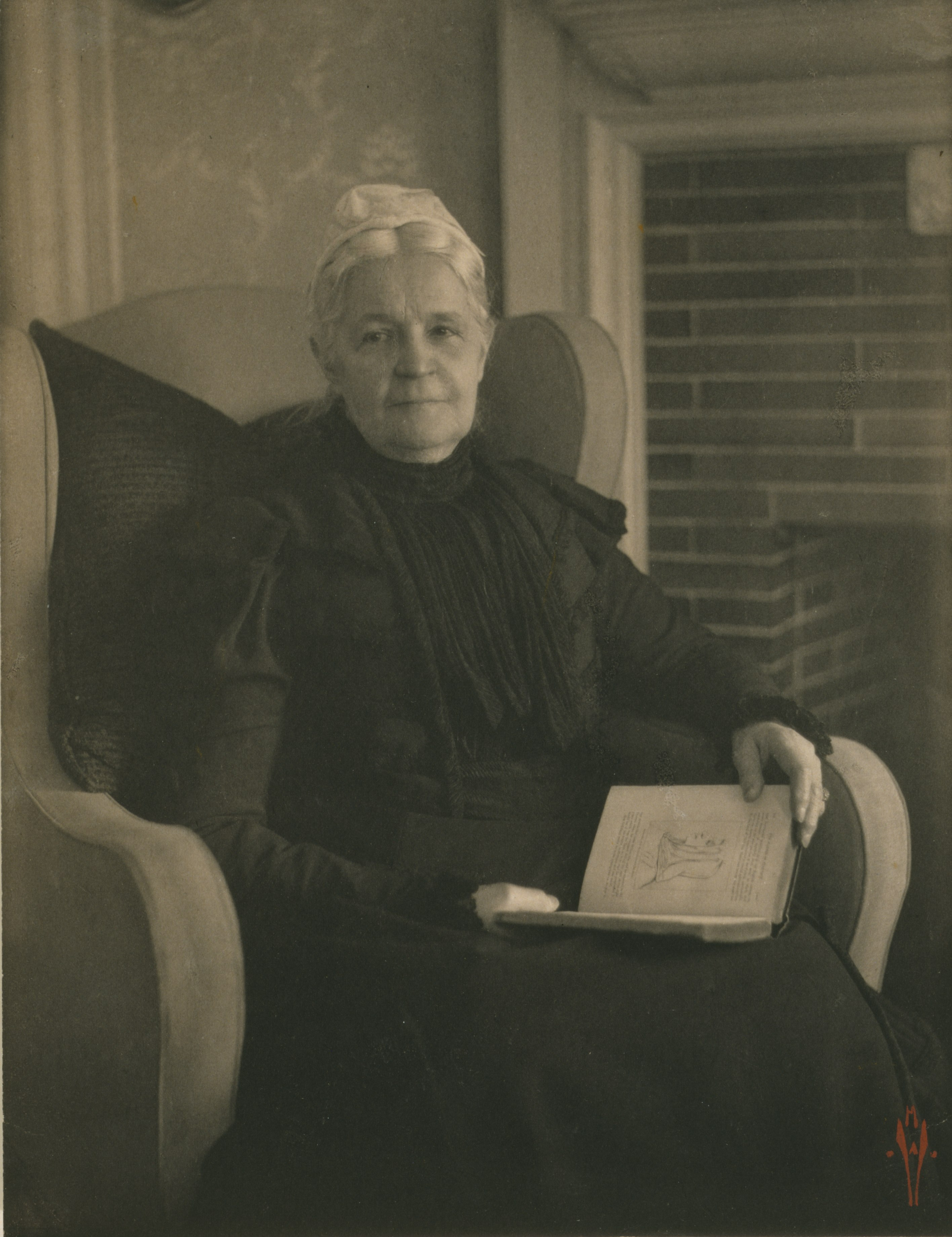
Old woman in an armchair, with an open book in her lap, ca. 1900

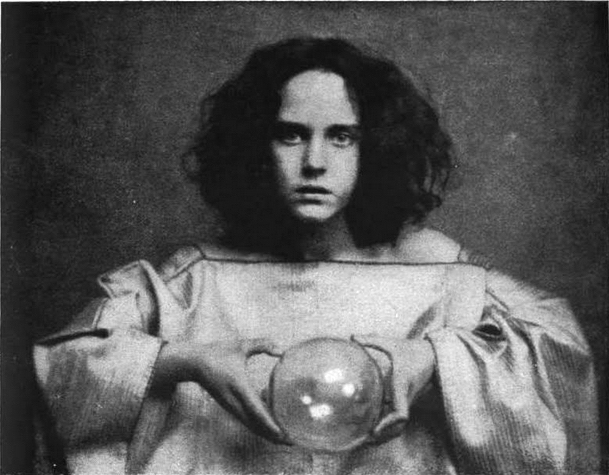
The Crystal Globe, ca. 1907
