= John Cafferty and the Beaver Brown Band =

American rock band

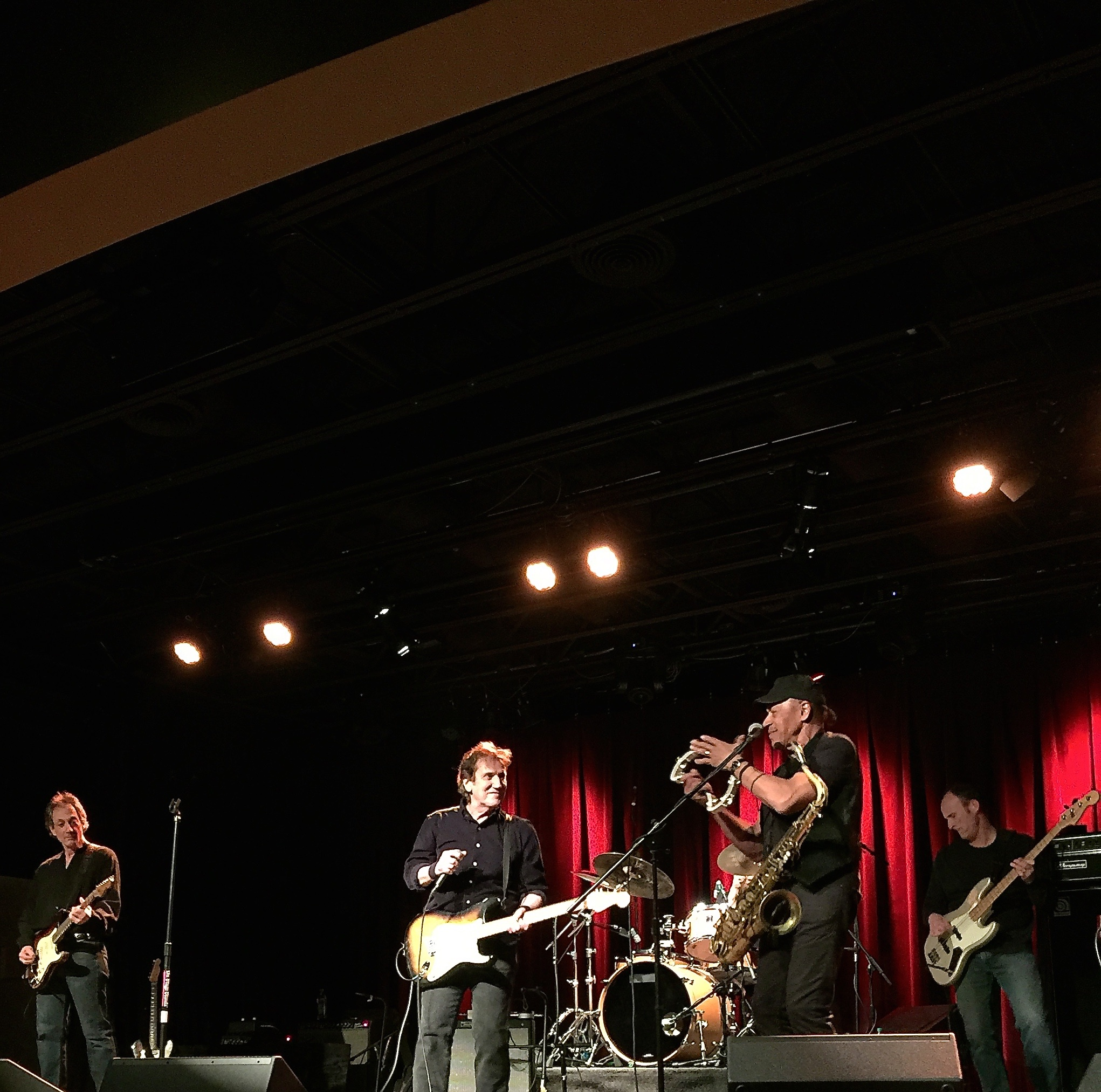
- The Beaver Brown band performing in 2015

Background information
- Origin: Narragansett, Rhode Island, U.S.
- Genres: Rock, heartland rock
- Years active: 1972–present
- Labels: Scotti Bros., Epic, CBS Associated Records
- Members: John Cafferty; Gary "Guitar" Gramolini; Jackie Santos; Steve Burke; Dean Cassell; Don “DC” Culp
- Past members: Bobby Cotoia; Pat Lupo; Michael “Tunes” Antunes; Kenny Jo Silva; Paul Jackson; Fred Macari; Thom Enright

John Cafferty & the Beaver Brown Band is an American rock band from Rhode Island which began its career in 1972, and achieved mainstream success in the 1980s. Originally known as simply Beaver Brown, they got their name from a paint can. The classic lineup of the group (consisting of John Cafferty on vocals and guitar, Gary Gramolini on lead guitar, Pat Lupo on bass, Kenny Jo Silva on drums, Bobby Cotoia on keyboards, and Michael "Tunes" Antunes on saxophone) started out as a New England bar band based in Narragansett, Rhode Island and established a following up and down the Northeast corridor with strongholds in the beach resort towns of Narragansett and Misquamicut, Rhode Island; New York City; New Haven, Connecticut; Boston, Massachusetts; and Asbury Park, New Jersey.

== History ==
They first achieved success with a 1980 self-released single pairing two of their songs, "Wild Summer Nights" and "Tender Years", which sold over 10,000 copies and had radio play up and down the Atlantic seaboard. Despite their success, the act was ignored by the major labels due to persistent critical comparisons to Bruce Springsteen & The E Street Band. They finally achieved international success when producer Kenny Vance, a longtime fan, offered them the score to a movie soundtrack he was helming, based on a best-selling novel about a legendary bar band, Eddie and the Cruisers. Thanks to frequent airings of the film on HBO and the purchase of the soundtrack album by their established fanbase, as well as hundreds of thousands of new converts, Eddie and the Cruisers: Original Motion Picture Soundtrack reached the top 10 on the Billboard 200 chart, and produced a number 7 hit single ("On the Dark Side") on the Billboard Hot 100. "On the Dark Side" also held number-one on the Album Rock Tracks chart for five weeks. The album was eventually certified triple platinum by the RIAA.

The group's follow-up album Tough All Over (1985) made the top 40, enjoying great sales for "C-I-T-Y" and the title track, which became their second number-one single on the Mainstream Rock Tracks chart. Another song from that album, "Voice of America's Sons", was the featured theme song on the official soundtrack of the action movie Cobra (1986), starring Sylvester Stallone, and Cafferty's solo track "Heart's on Fire" was featured in another Stallone movie, Rocky IV (1985).

The band's next album, the self-produced Roadhouse, sold well to their fan base but did not reach the sales heights of Tough All Over. In 1989, they followed it with the score to an "Eddie" sequel, Eddie and the Cruisers II: Eddie Lives! which became their last major label release of new material.

Several personnel changes occurred over the next few years with Kenny Jo Silva departing in 1992 and Pat Lupo in 1994 to be replaced, respectively, by Jackie Santos, formerly of Tavares, and Dean Cassell. Bobby Cotoia had been forced to retire from the road during the 1990s due to illness, but remained an active member of the group in the studio. His on-stage replacement was Steve Burke who remains in the line-up. Cotoia died from liver disease on September 3, 2004, survived by a wife and two children. On many of the band's shows over the past decade, drummer Don "DC" Culp has filled the role when Santos is not available.

In 2016, Rolling Stone ranked the fictional Eddie and the Cruisers at No. 18 in their list of 25 Greatest Movie Bands.

John Cafferty & The Beaver Brown Band continue to tour. Their music has appeared on the soundtracks of several major motion pictures including There's Something About Mary (1998) and Dumb and Dumber To (2014).

Original bassist Pat Lupo died on June 21, 2021, at the age of 66.

In August 2021, the band were the headline performers at the Providence Performing Arts Center's first in-person event since the beginning of the COVID-19 pandemic the previous year, sharing the bill with Southside Johnny and the Asbury Jukes.

In September 2022, the band celebrated its 50th anniversary with the release of a greatest hits album.

On May 26, 2023, the band issued their first new single since 1989, entitled "Day in the Sun" from their as-of-yet unnamed forthcoming album which was initially scheduled to be released in 2023. On August 14, 2023, "Send a Little Message to You", the second single from the upcoming album, was released. On August 30, 2023, the band released "Blue Moonlight Drive", the third single from their forthcoming album.

In 2025, Cafferty and his band released Sound of Waves, a collection of 13 songs written by Cafferty. That year, their long-time saxophonist Michael Antunes died of kidney failure at the age of 85, having just played his final show with the band 10 days earlier.

== Members ==
Current members

- John Cafferty - lead vocals, rhythm guitar, additional lead guitar (1972–present)
- Gary "Guitar" Gramolini - backing vocals, lead guitar (1972–present)
- Steve Burke - keyboards (199?–present)
- Jackie Santos - drums (1992–present)
- Dean Cassell - bass (1994–present)

Former members

- Bobby Cotoia - piano, synthesizer, keyboards (1972–2004; died September 3, 2004)
- Michael "Tunes" Antunes - backing vocals, saxophone, tambourine (197?-2025; died August 20, 2025)
- Paul "Cozy" Jackson - saxophone, keyboards
- Fred Macari - saxophone
- Thom Enright - bass, guitar
- Patrick Lupo - bass (1972–1994; died June 21, 2021)
- Kenny Jo Silva - drums (1972–1992)* Steve Burke - keyboards (199?–present)

== Discography ==
=== Studio albums ===
Title	Details	Peak chart positions	
Title	Details	US	CAN
Eddie and the Cruisers soundtrack	Release date: August 30, 1983; Label: CBS Records	9	—
Tough All Over	Release date: June 1985; Label: Scotti Bros.	40	37
Roadhouse	Release date: May 18, 1988; Label: Scotti Bros.	—	—
Eddie and the Cruisers II: Eddie Lives! soundtrack	Release date: August 18, 1989; Label: Scotti Bros.	121	—
Sound of Waves	Release date: April 11, 2025; Label: Moonstone Music	—	—

=== Compilation albums ===
Title	Details
Eddie and the Cruisers: The Unreleased Tapes	Release date: October 22, 1991; Label: Volcano Records
Eddie and the Cruisers: Live and in Concert	Release date: May 22, 1992; Label: Scotti Bros.
John Cafferty and the Beaver Brown Band: Extended Versions	Release date: October 5, 2004; Label: BMG
Greatest Hits	Release date: September 30, 2022; Label: Iconoclassic Records

=== Singles ===
Year	Single	Peak chart positions			Album
Year	Single	US	US Main	CAN	Album
1980	"Wild Summer Nights” / “Tender Years" (Credited as Beaver Brown)	—	—	—	non-album single
1983	"On the Dark Side" (Credited as Eddie and The Cruisers)	64	—	—	Eddie and the Cruisers (soundtrack)
1984	"Tender Years"	78	—	—	Eddie and the Cruisers (soundtrack)
1984	"On the Dark Side" (re-issue) (Note: "On the Dark Side" was originally released in 1983 on Scotti Bros. ZS404107(Epic) and was credited as Eddie and The Cruisers; the 1984 re-issue was on Scotti Bros. 4-04594/EPIC and credited as John Cafferty & The Beaver Brown Band.)	7	1	19	Eddie and the Cruisers (soundtrack)
1984	"Tender Years" (re-issue) (Note: "Tender Years" was originally released in January 1984 on Scotti Bros. 404327. It spent five weeks on the Hot 100, peaking at number 78 on the chart dated February 18, 1984. In November of that same year, it was re-issued on Scotti Bros. 4-04682/Epic. It spent 14 weeks on the Hot 100, eventually peaking at number 31 on the chart dated January 12, 1985.)	31	10	75	Eddie and the Cruisers (soundtrack)
1985	"Tough All Over"	22	1	37	Tough All Over
1985	"C-I-T-Y"	18	9	30	Tough All Over
1985	"Small Town Girl"	64	—	—	Tough All Over
1986	"Voice of America's Sons"	62	—	—	Tough All Over
1986	"Heart's on Fire" (John Cafferty solo)	76	—	68	Rocky IV (soundtrack)
1988	"Song and Dance"	—	47	—	Roadhouse
1989	"Pride and Passion"	66	—	—	Eddie and the Cruisers II: Eddie Lives! (soundtrack)
2023	"Day in the Sun"	—	—	—	Sound of Waves
2023	"Send a Little Message to You"	—	—	—	Sound of Waves
2023	"Blue Moonlight Drive"	—	—	—	Sound of Waves

== Bibliography ==
- Himes, Jeffrey (October 24, 1984). "Beaver Brown: Maturity and Power". The Washington Post.
