= Michael Paré =

American actor (born 1958)

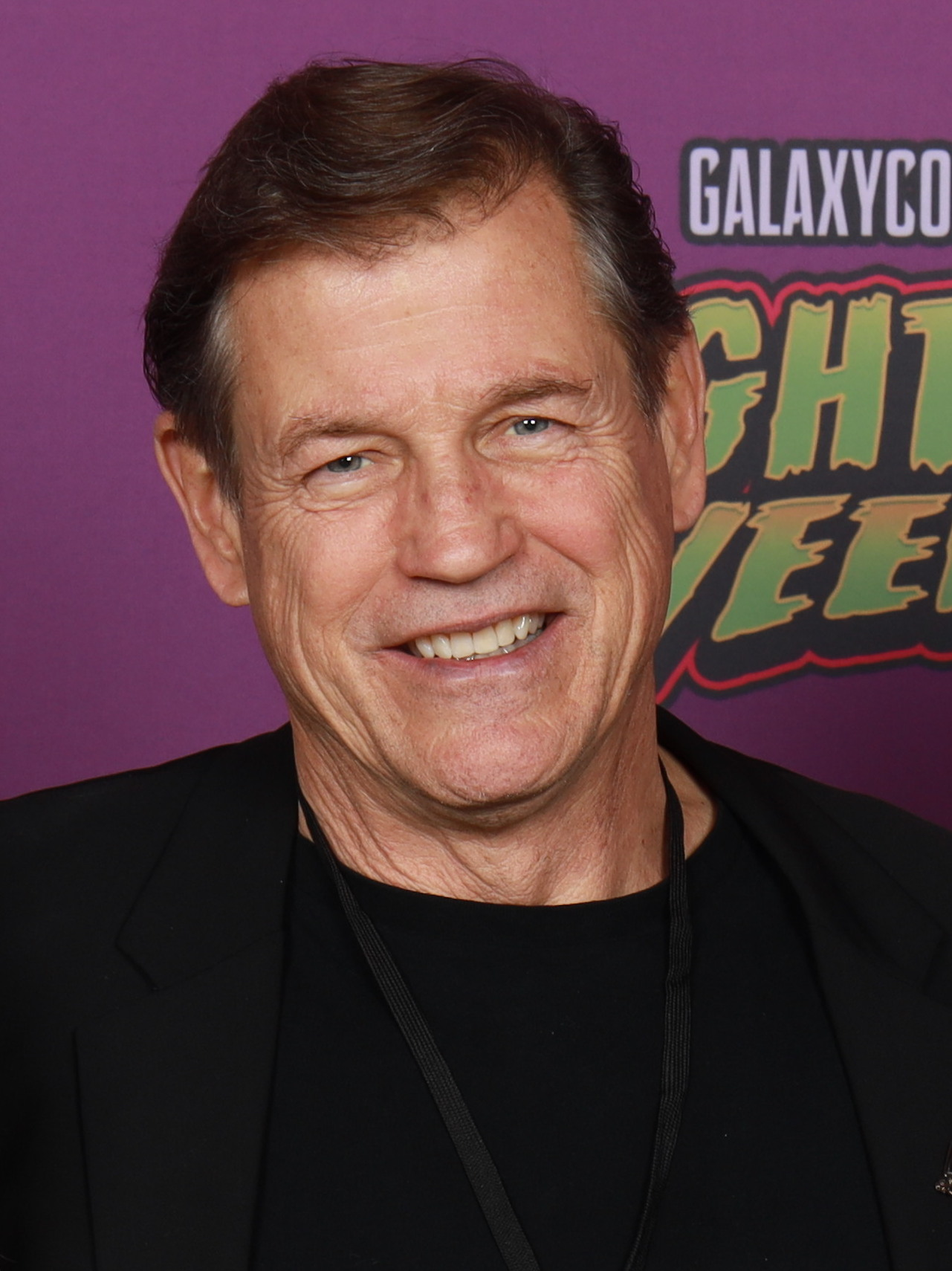
- Paré in 2025
- Born: Michael Kevin Paré; October 9, 1958 (age 67); New York City, U.S.
- Education: The Culinary Institute of America
- Occupations: Actor; chef
- Years active: 1981–present
- Spouses: Lisa Katselas (m. 1980; div. 1982) Marisa Roebuck (m. 1986; div. 1988) Marjolein Booy (m. 1992)
- Children: 1

I've been playing heroes, and heroes are not normal people. You can't find a leading man doing a nine-to-five job on Wall Street. And that hurt because they said, "You can't play a regular person." Tom Cody was also bigger than life. And in The Philadelphia Experiment, I'm a time traveler for god's sake. So for a long time, all I played was cops, heroes and soldiers.

— Paré on being typecast as a macho man.

Michael Kevin Paré (born October 9, 1958) is an American actor. He is best known for his roles in the films Eddie and the Cruisers (1983), Streets of Fire (1984), and The Philadelphia Experiment (1984), and on the series Houston Knights (1987–1988).

== Early life ==
Paré was born in Brooklyn, New York, the son of Joan and Francis Paré, who owned print shops. He has six sisters and three brothers. Paré's father was of French-Canadian ancestry. His father died from leukemia when Paré was five, leaving his mother to raise the children.

Growing up, Paré was a fan of James Dean, Marlon Brando, Montgomery Clift, Paul Newman, and Robert Mitchum, and felt he was "a kindred spirit" to them. He was working as a chef in New York City when he met talent agent Yvette Bikoff, who convinced him to try acting. In the early 1980s, he studied acting under Uta Hagen. He shot a series of television commercials in Japan.

In August 1987, noted for his physique in his macho roles in The Greatest American Hero, Eddie and the Cruisers and Streets of Fire, Paré was chosen as the cover model for the first issue of Men's Fitness. The magazine was folded into Men's Journal in 2017; in 2018, Men's Journal ranked Paré's as the No. 1 cover in the former magazine's more than 300-issue history.

== Career ==
His first starring role was as Tony Villicana on the television series The Greatest American Hero. His best-known film roles were as Eddie Wilson in Eddie and the Cruisers (1983) and its sequel Eddie and the Cruisers II: Eddie Lives! (1989), as well as Streets of Fire (1984) and The Philadelphia Experiment (1984). Paré also appeared in the 2012 remake of The Philadelphia Experiment. He starred as a tortured soldier named Brad Cartowski in the 1993 action film Deadly Heroes, directed by Menahem Golan. Other films included Moon 44 (1990), Village of the Damned (1995), Bad Moon (1996), Hope Floats (1998), and The Virgin Suicides (1999).

Paré is best known for his deep, raspy voice, muscular physique, rugged screen presence, and classic action hero demeanour. In his 2017 interview for Men's Journal he revealed that as a young actor he wasn't sure if he wanted to make a career as “the muscular leading guy", and instead tried to follow in the footsteps of his idols — Marlon Brando and James Dean.

Paré won the Best Actor award at PollyGrind Film Festival for the film Road to Hell, playing again the role of Tom Cody.

On television, Paré starred with Michael Beck in the drama Houston Knights in 1987–1988 as well as the 2001 television series Starhunter. The actor frequently appears in Uwe Boll's works.

Paré has had a very busy workload in recent years, with 114 credits from 2015–2024 (mostly in low-budget films and TV movies), including twenty roles in 2022 alone and another 19 in 2024.

== Personal life ==
He has married three times. His first wife (1980–1984) was film producer Lisa Katselas; his second wife, Marisa Roebuck (1986–1988); his present wife (since 1992) is Marjolein Booy, a former fashion model, with whom he has one child. Paré stated that he lives "a good, clean life", and trains frequently. He lives in California.

== Filmography ==
=== Film ===
Year	Title	Role	Notes
1981	Crazy Times	Harry	TV movie
1983	Eddie and the Cruisers	Eddie Wilson	
1983	Undercover	Max	
1984	Streets of Fire	Tom Cody	
1984	The Philadelphia Experiment	David Herdeg	
1985	Space Rage	Grange	
1986	Instant Justice	Scott Youngblood	
1987	The Women's Club	Patrick	
1988	World Gone Wild	George Landon	
1989	Eddie and the Cruisers II: Eddie Lives!	Eddie Wilson / Joe West	
1990	The Dark Sun	Ruggero Brickman	
1990	Moon 44	Felix Stone	
1990	The Closer	Larry Freed	
1990	Dragonfight	Moorpark	
1991	Concrete War	Jeff	
1991	Killing Streets	Chris Brandt / Craig Brandt	
1992	Into the Sun	Captain Paul Watkins	
1992	Sunset Heat	Eric Wright	
1992	Blink of an Eye	Sam Browning	
1992	Empire City	Joey Andre	TV movie
1993	Point of Impact	Jack Davis	
1993	Deadly Heroes	Brad Cartowski	
1994	Warriors	Colin	
1995	The Dangerous	Random	
1995	Lunarcop	Joe Brody	
1995	Village of the Damned	Frank McGowan	
1995	Triplecross	Teddy "T.C." Cooper	TV movie
1995	Raging Angels	Colin	
1996	Coyote Run	Pershing	
1996	The Colony	Alec Harken	TV movie
1996	Carver's Gate	Carver	TV movie
1996	Bad Moon	Ted Harrison	
1997	2103: The Deadly Wake	Tarkis	
1997	Falling Fire	Daryl Boden	
1997	Strip Search	Robby Durrell	
1997	Merchant of Death	Jim Randell	
1998	Hope Floats	Bill Pruitt	
1998	Back to Even	Boyle	
1998	October 22	Gary	
1998	Men of Means	Rico "Bullet" Burke	
1999	The Virgin Suicides	Adult Trip Fontaine	
1999	Space Fury	Konrad	Video
2000	Peril	Vincent	Video
2000	Sanctimony	Jim Renart	
2001	A Month of Sundays	Tomas McCabel	
2001	Blackwoods	Sheriff Harding	
2002	Heart of America	Will Prat	
2003	Fate	Detective Cody Martin	
2003	Red Serpent	Steve Nichols	
2004	Gargoyle: Wings of Darkness	CIA Agent Ty "Griff" Griffin	Video
2005	Crash Landing	Captain Williams	
2005	Komodo vs. Cobra	Mike A. Stoddard	TV movie
2005	BloodRayne	Iancu	
2006	Saurian	Jace Randall	TV movie
2007	Seed	Detective Matt Bishop	
2007	Polycarp	Detective Barry Harper	
2007	Postal	Panhandler	
2007	BloodRayne II: Deliverance	Pat Garrett	Video
2007	Furnace	Detective Michael Turner	
2008	Ninja Cheerleaders	Victor Lazzaro	
2008	Tunnel Rats	Sergeant Vic Hollowborn	
2008	100 Feet	Mike Watson	
2008	Alone in the Dark II	Willson	Video
2008	Far Cry	Paul Summers	
2008	Dark World	Harry	
2008	Road to Hell	Tom Cody	
2009	The Perfect Sleep	Officer Pavlovich	
2009	Direct Contact	Clive Connelly	
2009	Rampage	Sheriff Melvoy	
2010	Tales of an Ancient Empire	Oda	
2010	Cool Dog	Dean Warner	Video
2010	Amphibiouso	Jack Bowman	
2011	The Lincoln Lawyer	Detective Kurlen	
2011	Bloodrayne: The Third Reich	Commander Ekart Brand	
2011	Blubberella	Commandant Ekart Brand	
2012	Gone	Lieutenant Ray Bozeman	
2012	Maximum Conviction	Chris Blake	
2012	The Philadelphia Experiment	Hagan	TV movie
2012	The Come Up	Ron Zimmermann	Short
2013	How Sweet It Is	Mike Cicero	
2013	Real Gangsters	Frank "Frankie" D'Cecco	
2013	Assault on Wall Street	Frank	
2013	Suddenly	Conklin	
2013	Jet Set	Ryan	
2014	The Last Outlaw	Sheriff Atherton	Video
2014	Snapshot	The President	
2014	Wings of the Dragon	Jackson Lee	
2014	The Big Fat Stone	Detective Farinelli	
2015	24 Hours	Captain Mike Ryan	
2015	A Perfect Vacation	Xander	
2015	No Deposit	Mickey Ryan	
2015	Checkmate	Captain Raymond Mitchell Howard	
2015	The Cask of Amontilladoas	Fortunato	Short
2015	The Vatican Tapes	Detective Harris	
2015	Operator	Howard	
2015	The Shelter	Thomas Jacob	
2015	Sicilian Vampire	Sammy	
2015	The Good, the Bad and the Dead	Sheriff Olson	
2015	Bone Tomahawk	Mr. Wallington	
2016	Decommissioned	Detective Tom Weston	
2016	Swap	Captain Doug Rice	
2016	Abattoir	Richard Renshaw	
2016	Traded	Clay Travis	
2016	The Infiltrator	Barry Seal	
2016	Nessie & Me	Dad	
2016	The Red Maple Leaf	Ambassador Patrick Adams Jr.	
2017	Povratak	Michael Shreder	
2017	A Doggone Hollywood	Sheriff Evans	
2017	American Violence	Martin Bigg	
2017	Global Meltdown	Amos Cade	TV movie
2017	The Neighborhood	Johnny "Johnny 3"	
2017	Gangster Land	Captain O'Connor	
2017	The Wrong Man	Gary Moore	TV movie
2017	Jason's Letter	Brad Macaulay	
2018	Battle Drone	Karl Kess	
2018	Puppet Master: The Littlest Reich	Detective Brown	
2018	The Debt Collector	Alex "Mad Alex"	
2018	Astro	Allen Smith	
2018	The Wrong Friend	Lieutenant Forni	TV movie
2018	Talk to the Animals	Ted	Short
2018	Reborn	Detective Marc Fox	
2018	City of Lies	Detective Varney	
2018	A Christmas in Royal Fashion	Dan Carson	TV movie
2019	The Last Big Save	Derek	
2019	Making a Deal with the Devil	Pierre	
2019	Hollow Point	Damian Wakefield	
2019	Mayday	Adam Anderson	
2019	Once Upon a Time in Deadwood	Swearengen	
2019	Manipulated	Roger "Duke" Brown	
2019	Big Kill	Colonel Granger	
2020	Emerald Run	Matteo Trino	
2020	The Insurrection	Sergeant Major	
2020	Invincible	Trevor Morgan	
2020	Captors	Charles Dusker	
2020	Middleton Christmas	Johnny	
2021	The Wrong Fiancé	Police Chief Sawyer	TV movie
2021	Triassic Hunt	Jordan Freedman	
2021	The Resonator: Miskatonic U	Professor Wallace	
2021	The Penthouse	Charles	
2021	Mummy Dearest	Dr. Jason	
2021	Painkiller	Dr. Alan Rhodes	
2021	Deceived by My Mother-In-Law	Ross	TV movie
2021	Mommy's Deadly Con Artist	Ross	TV movie
2021	Raunch and Roll	Carl Weinstein	
2021	Mind Games	Colonel Reeder	
2021	Righteous Blood	Jericho	
2021	Bed Bug	The Killer	Short
2021	The Wild Man: Skunk Ape	Captain Stryker	
2021	South of Heaven	Joey	
2021	Christmas Collision	Jaggar Huntley	
2022	Beyond the Resonator	Professor Wallace	
2022	Curse of the Re-Animator	Professor Wallace	
2022	Lockdown	Roger Kinkaid	
2022	Top Gunner: Danger Zone	Air Marshall Tony Wilkes	
2022	Shooting Star	Sheriff Wiley	
2022	As Long As I'm Famous	Older Sid	
2022	Dawn	Officer Barry	
2022	Pig Killer	Detective Oppal	
2022	The Red Tide Massacre	Sheriff Tom Fuller	
2022	They Crawl Beneath	Bill Moritz	
2022	Nix	Idres	
2022	Attack on Titan	Citizen Prime Ortiz	
2022	Renegades	CIA Agent Donovan	
2022	Headless Horseman	Devil	
2022	Bridge of the Doomed	Colonel Charon	
2022	Space Wars: Quest for the Deepstar	Kip	
2022	2025 Armageddon	Thomas Ramsey	
2022	3.3 Miles	Ray	
2022	Twisted Vines	Branson Wright	
2022	Alabama Rose	Ethan	
2023	End of Loyalty	"Pops"	
2023	If I Can't Have You	Mr. Sklar	TV movie
2023	Kings of L.A.	Artie	
2023	The Beast Comes at Midnight	Night	
2023	Wrongful Death	Dr. David Moore	
2023	The Puppetman	Detective Al	
2023	Alien Apocalypse	Director Storm	
2023	In the Shadows	Sam Hammonds	
2023	Family Ornaments	Grandpa Pat	
2023	The Stairwell	Hollister	Short
2023	A Christmas Intern	William	TV movie
2023	America Is Sinking	General Robert Glenn	
2023	Very Frightening Tales	Edward Barnes	
2024	Scars	Tom	
2024	The Wrong Life Coach	Detective Clover	TV movie
2024	Wanted Man	Tinelli	
2024	Planetquake	General West	
2024	Tall, Dark, and Dangerous	Bill	TV movie
2024	Camp Pleasant Lake	Rick Rutherford	
2024	Sentinel	The President	
2024	War of the Worlds: Extinction	General Andres Alfaro	
2024	Kill Craft	Thomas Delon	
2024	Bedtime Stories: Tales of Love and Hate	Fortunato	
2024	Steady	Rudy	Short
2024	Shark Island	Charlie	Video
2024	Alien: Rubicon	President McCoy	
2024	In Tenebras: Into the Darkness	Captain Shaw	
2024	9 Windows	Agent Larry Thurgood	
2024	The Vampire and the Vigilante	Gabriel	
2024	Angel with a Gun	Archer	
2024	Revival	Martin	
2024	Desert Fiends	Leonard	
2025	Mundije	CIA Chief	
2025	The Land That Time Forgot	Admiral Christopher Jackman	
2025	Death 4 Dinner	Detective Noah Rafferty	
2025	Alien Invasion: Rise of the Phoenix	Dr. Jonathan Wright	
2025	Elite Target	Disappointed Man	
2025	Morgan: Killer Doll	John	
2025	Bloodstorm	Police Chief	
2025	Clutch	Marty	
2025	Bury 'Em Deep	Sheriff Sykes	
2025	Shark Terror	Captain Schaeffer	
2025	Wrongful Death 2: Bloodlines	Dr. David Moore	
2025	Helloween	John Parker	
2025	Kung Fu Slayers	Steven Steinberg	
2025	3: The Movie	Father Joe	
2025	Rocky's Galaxy	Colonel Subblet	
2025	Sacred Grounds: Forbidden	Marshal Wilson	
2025	A Christmas Murder Mystery	Harold Sterling	TV movie
2025	Fight Pride	Gil	
2026	Order of the Dragon	Henry Wyatt	
2026	Knightfall	Matthew	

=== Television ===
Year	Title	Role	Notes
1981-1983	The Greatest American Hero	Tony Villicana	Main Cast: Season 1-2, Guest: Season 3
1987-1988	Houston Knights	Sergeant Joey La Fiamma	Main Cast
2000-2003	Starhunter	Dante Montana	Main Cast: Season 1, Recurring Cast: Season 2
2004	Cold Case	Randy Price	Episode: "Greed"
2006	South Beach	Charlie Evans	Recurring Cast
2007	Whatever Happened To?	Himself	Episode: "Rebels"
2011	Memphis Beat	Dave Hargrove	Episode: "Things We Carry"
2011	House	Warden Delaire	Episode: "Twenty Vicodin"
2012	Leverage	FBI Special Agent Dennis Powell	Episode: "The Radio Job"
2017	Starhunter Transformation	Dante Montana	Main Cast
2017-2018	Starhunter ReduX	Dante Montana	Main Cast
2019	Seven Days	O'Donnell	Episode: "Episode #1.1"
2021-2022	Keeping Up with the Joneses	Sheldon	Main Cast

=== Music video ===
Year	Artist	Song	Role
1983	Eddie and the Cruisers	"On the Dark Side"	Eddie Wilson

== Awards and nominations ==
=== Awards ===
PollyGrind Film Festival

- Best Actor: 2012
