= Tough All Over (song) =

Single by John Cafferty and the Beaver Brown Band

from the album Tough All Over
- B-side: "Strangers in Paradise"
- Released: April 1985
- Genre: Synthpop, heartland rock, pop rock
- Length: 3:56
- Label: Scotti Bros.
- Songwriter: John Cafferty
- Producer: Kenny Vance

John Cafferty and the Beaver Brown Band singles chronology
"Tender Years" (1984)	"Tough All Over" (1985)	"C-I-T-Y" (1985)

Music video
- "Tough All Over" on YouTube

"Tough All Over" is a song by American rock band John Cafferty and the Beaver Brown Band. Written by lead singer John Cafferty, it was released in 1985 as the first single from their second studio album Tough All Over. The single entered the Billboard Hot 100 on May 11, 1985 at number 53, ultimately climbing to number 22 on July 6, 1985 where it would become the band's third top 40 hit in the United States following the success of the singles "On the Dark Side" and "Tender Years". The single additionally enjoyed major success on the US Mainstream Rock chart, where it peaked at number one. Meanwhile, On the US Cash Box Top 100, it peaked at number 20 on July 13, 1985 where it spent one week at that position.

A hard rock song built on a prominent synthesizer riff, the song describes the struggles of young working individuals. "Tough All Over" and the next single, "C-I-T-Y" are heavily inspired by the musical style of Bruce Springsteen, as noted by AllMusic in its review of the parent album.

== Track listing ==
US 7" single

1. "Tough All Over" - 3:56
2. "Strangers in Paradise" - 4:28

== Chart performance ==
Chart (1985)	Peak position
Canada Top Singles (RPM)	37
US Billboard Hot 100	22
US Mainstream Rock (Billboard)	1
US Cash Box Top 100	20
