= Michael Antunes =

American saxophonist (1940–2025)

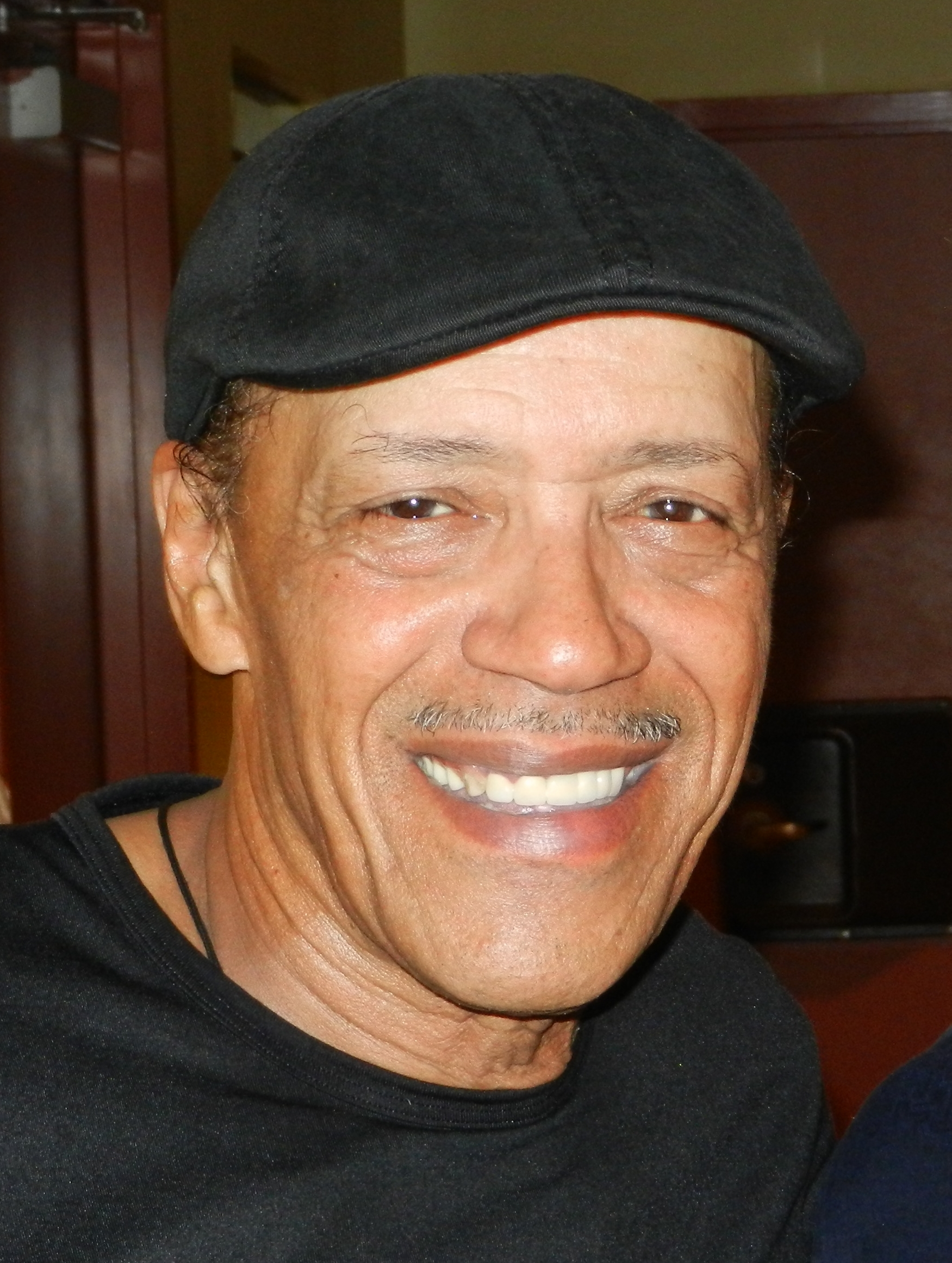
- Antunes in 2011

Background information
- Born: August 10, 1940; New Bedford, Massachusetts, U.S.
- Died: August 19, 2025 (aged 85)
- Genres: Pop; rock
- Occupation: Musician
- Instrument: Saxophone
- Years active: 1953–2025
- Formerly of: John Cafferty and the Beaver Brown Band; Ernie and the Automatics

Michael "Tunes" Antunes (August 10, 1940 – August 19, 2025) was an American saxophonist. He is most noted for playing the tenor saxophone with John Cafferty and the Beaver Brown Band and for his acting role as the saxophonist in the 1983 movie Eddie and the Cruisers and its sequel, Eddie and the Cruisers II: Eddie Lives!

== Early life ==
Antunes was a second-generation American with a Cape Verde heritage who was born into a musical family in New Bedford, Massachusetts. Antunes' father Peter Antunes played upright bass, guitar and Hammond organ, performing throughout New England. Antunes began performing at age 13 while still attending Dartmouth High School, and most of his early shows were playing Cape Verde music with his guitarist brother David and a cousin in a band called Second Generation. Throughout the 1960s, Antunes performed in New England and upstate New York as a saxophone player in the Blazers, Bernie and the Cavaliers, the New Spices, Mike n’ Jenna, and Triumph. While with the Blazers, he recorded the songs "Grasshopper" with Mundo records (#864), and "A-Time" (#2002) and a remake of the Li’l Ray Armstrong song, "Boom Boom" (#2001) on Empire Records.

== Mainstream success ==
In the 1970s Antunes joined John Cafferty & The Beaver Brown Band, which is an American rock band from Rhode Island. The band's soundtrack album for the movie, Eddie and the Cruisers reached the top 10 on the Billboard 200 chart and produced a number 7 hit single, "On the Dark Side" on the Billboard Hot 100. Antunes performed in the movie as the band's saxophone player and also in the movie's sequel. In 2016, Rolling Stone ranked the fictional Eddie and the Cruisers at #18 in their list of 25 Greatest Movie Bands. "On the Dark Side" held number-one on the Album Rock Tracks chart for five weeks. The album was eventually certified triple Platinum by the RIAA.

In addition to playing with John Cafferty & The Beaver Brown Band, from 2004 to 2011, Antunes played with Ernie and the Automatics, a blues band that included former members of Boston, The J. Geils Band, and Peter Wolf's band.

== Personal life and death ==
Antunes had 11 children with his wife Jennifer, two of whom are involved in the music industry: sons Kevin (the musical director for Madonna) and Matthew (the musical director for Tavares). Antunes died of kidney failure on August 19, 2025, at the age of 85.
