= Biggest Elvis: A Novel =

1996 novel by P. F. Kluge

- Book cover for P. F. Kluge's novel Biggest Elvis
- Author: P. F. Kluge
- Language: English
- Genre: Fiction
- Publisher: Penguin
- Publication date: 1996
- Publication place: United States
- Pages: 341
- ISBN: 0-14-025811-6

Biggest Elvis, also known as Biggest Elvis: A Novel, is a novel written by the American author P. F. Kluge, a former U.S. Peace Corps volunteer in the Pacific region and writer-in-residence at Kenyon College. This 1996 literary piece started out as a journalistic writing for Playboy magazine, to illustrate the nightlife in brothels and nightclubs when fleets of American naval servicemen dock for sailors' shore-leave in the port of Olongapo City. It is also a portrayal of the entrapment of poverty-stricken residents of Olongapo within a "military economy" through the nightly and ritualistic on-stage rebirths, deaths and resurrections of Elvis Presley by three American copycats living and making a livelihood while in the Philippines.

== Thematic description ==
In general, Kluge’s Biggest Elvis is the story of a former college professor and of America itself. The "part mystery" and "part love story" novel is set in Olongapo City, a Philippine town closest to Subic Naval Base, a former U.S. naval installation in the Far East during the 1990s. As a narrative and a commentary regarding American "cultural imperialism" – including "pop-culturalism" – in the Asian region, and the final years of militaristic presence of the United States in Subic Bay, Biggest Elvis protagonizes three American Elvis Presley impersonators and caricatures who perform in a nightclub known as "Graceland", a building that started out as a movie theater.

== Plot and character outline ==
The triad of reborn Elvises include the fictional persons of Ward Wiggins, Chester Lane and Albert Lane. They were a representation of the changing roles of Americans in the world stage of the time, as "vigorous pioneers" and "lean innovators" turned extravagant and colossal superpowers. Wiggins was the eldest of the trio of impersonators and an unsuccessful English language professor. Chester Lane, known in the narrative as Baby Elvis, was the imitator of the youthful Elvis Presley. His brother, Albert, revived the Elvis epitomized in American cinema, and called "Dude Elvis". The most senior and an obese personification of Elvis, Wiggins, came to be regarded as the "biggest Elvis" – a religious symbolic figure and savior – of the local people and bargirls of Olongapo City, Wiggins was the most serious entertainer among the three because he reached out to the bargirls in order to uproot and lift them up away from their current flesh-driven livelihood, while the Lane Brothers only regard their performances as a momentary engagement. For Wiggins, his show business entanglement was a saintly and spiritual calling. He believed that he was indeed the real Elvis, not just a mimic of America's king of rock and roll music. However, their popularity as performers was overtaken in the end, before Wiggins' final and greatest Elvis Presley entertainment act, by five bargirls, namely Whitney, Elvira, Dolly, Lucy Number Three and Malou.
