= William Ebeneezer Jones Jr. =

Missing person case from New Jersey, US

William "Billy" Ebeneezer Jones Jr
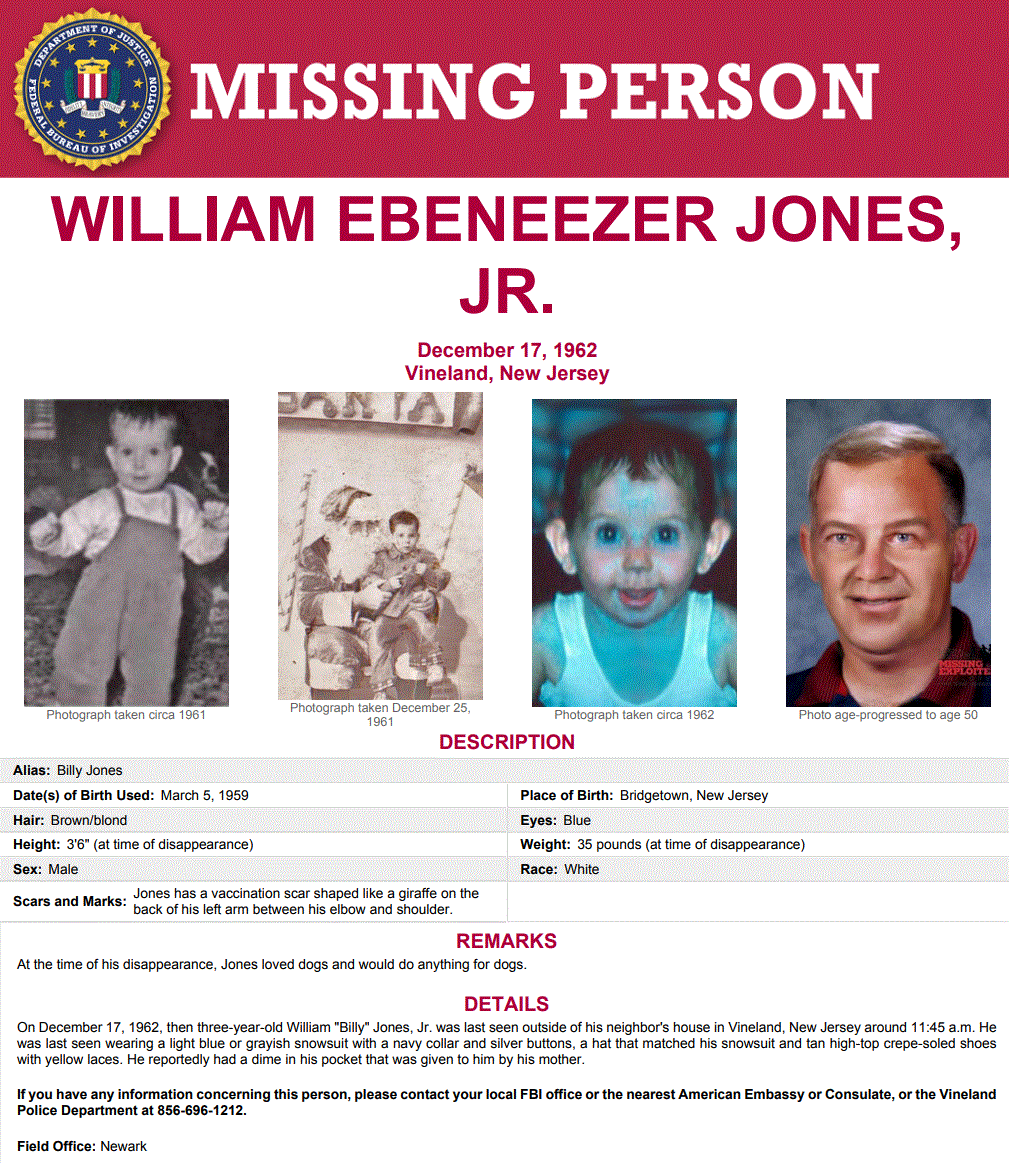
- Born: March 5, 1959
- Disappeared: December 17, 1962 (aged 3)
- Status: Missing for 63 years, 5 months and 29 days
- Known for: Missing Person
- Height: 3 ft 6 in (107 cm) (as of disappearance)
- Parents: William Ebeneezer Jones Sr. (father); Evelyn Jones (mother)

William Ebeneezer Jones Jr (March 5, 1959 – disappeared December 17, 1962), also known as Billy Jones, was three years old when he was last seen outside of his neighbor's house in Vineland, New Jersey around 11:45 a.m on December 17, 1962. His case is considered one of the oldest missing children under-five-years-old cases in New Jersey.

== Early life ==
William Jones was born in Bridgeton, New Jersey into the Jones family. His mother was Evelyn Jones, and his father's name is William Ebeneezer Jones Sr. Jones resided in Vineland, New Jersey, from where he would eventually disappear.

== Disappearance ==
On the morning of December 17, 1962, William and his sister, Jill Jones, went out to play. Some websites claim that his mother had been watching from a window and that she no sooner returned to it from checking on another child than discovered that William was gone. Other accounts claim that William simply went elsewhere and never came home. The facts that are known is that William was last seen near a neighbor's house around 11:45. Soon after William was last seen, his sister, Jill Jones returned home without William and had a plastic potted poinsettia in her hand. A manhunt was initiated an hour after William disappeared but no remains have ever been located.

== Case activity ==
In 2009, the case was reopened by a Vineland police detective by the name of Kristian Kirchner. The case has been covered by Fox News and The Philadelphia Inquirer.

== See also ==
- List of people who disappeared
