= Eddie and the Cruisers =

1983 film by Martin Davidson

- Theatrical release poster
- Directed by: Martin Davidson
- Screenplay by: Martin Davidson; Arlene Davidson
- Based on: Eddie and the Cruisers; 1980 novel by P. F. Kluge
- Produced by: Joseph Brooks; Robert K. Lifton
- Starring: Tom Berenger; Michael Paré
- Cinematography: Fred Murphy
- Edited by: Priscilla Nedd
- Music by: John Cafferty
- Production company: Aurora Productions
- Distributed by: Embassy Pictures
- Release date: September 23, 1983
- Running time: 95 minutes
- Country: United States
- Language: English
- Budget: $5 million
- Box office: $4.7 million

Eddie and the Cruisers is a 1983 American musical drama film directed by Martin Davidson with the screenplay written by the director and Arlene Davidson, based on the novel by P. F. Kluge. The sequel Eddie and the Cruisers II: Eddie Lives! followed in 1989.

== Plot ==
Television news reporter Maggie Foley investigates the mysterious disappearance of cult rock star Eddie Wilson. Flashbacks dramatize Eddie's life and the rise and fall of his band, the Cruisers.

The band gets its start at a club in Somers Point, New Jersey named Tony Mart's. Not adept at writing lyrics, Eddie hires Frank Ridgeway aka "Wordman" to be the band's keyboard player and lyricist, over the protests of band manager Doc Robbins and bassist Sal Amato. Rounding out the Cruisers are saxophonist Wendell Newton, background singer and Eddie's girlfriend Joann Carlino, and drummer Kenny Hopkins.

The band's first album, Tender Years, becomes a major hit, but recording their next album, A Season in Hell, turns out to be a nightmare. Inspired by the bleak, fatalistic poetry of Arthur Rimbaud, Eddie wants something far more ambitious than their previous pop songs and he pushes his bandmates beyond their limits, musically and personally. Eddie wants to be great, but bassist Sal replies, "We ain't great. We're just some guys from Jersey." Eddie makes it clear that if the band cannot be great, there is no reason to ever play music again. A Season in Hell is rejected by Satin Records on the grounds that it is "dark and strange". In the early morning hours, Eddie's car crashes through the railing and over the Stainton Memorial Causeway. Eddie vanishes without a trace, his body never found.

Eighteen years later, Satin re-releases the band's first album, which charts even higher than it did originally. A TV documentary is soon in the works, exploring the mystery of the band's second album, which had disappeared from the vaults of Satin Records the day after Eddie's disappearance. All of the original Cruisers are set to participate in the documentary except Eddie and Wendell Newton, who had died of an overdose (reported as a heart attack) in August 1963 at age 37. The others are now living ordinary lives: Sal Amato fronts a Cruisers tribute band; Ridgeway is a high school English teacher in Vineland; Doc works as a radio DJ in Asbury Park; Joann is a stage choreographer in Wildwood; and Hopkins works in a casino in Atlantic City.

During the documentary interviews, the band expresses a desire to relive the past, but many of their memories are humiliating. For example, during a concert at Benton College, where Frank was once a student, Eddie ridicules Frank repeatedly by referring to him as "Toby Tyler" after seeing him and Joann kissing before the concert. The other Cruisers members share similar stories.

Joann is able to complete the one piece of the puzzle that Frank could not: revealing what had happened to the band's second album. After storming from the studio, Eddie brought her to the Palace of Depression, a makeshift castle made of garbage that he visited often as a child. She reveals that she took the master tapes for the album from Satin Records, hiding them in the Palace of Depression, where she felt that they belonged.

Frank and Joann go back to the Palace of Depression to retrieve the tapes. A mystery man driving a blue 1957 Chevy Bel Air convertible identical to Eddie's arrives at the house and calls to Joann. But before she can reach the car, Frank unmasks the impostor, revealing him to be Doc, who was after the master tapes all these years. Moved by his story, Frank and Joann give him the master tapes. Doc drives off into the night vowing that the Cruisers will conquer the world this time, and Joann invites Frank into her house.

In a surprise reveal at the ending, a bearded, much older looking Eddie is shown alive, watching multiple televisions in the window of an appliance store, where the ending credits of Foley's documentary tribute to him and the band roll. He smiles serenely, proud to know that his work is finally being heard, and then disappears into the night.

== Cast ==
- Tom Berenger as Frank Ridgeway (piano) aka "The Word Man"
- Michael Paré as Eddie Wilson
- Joe Pantoliano as "Doc" Robbins
- Matthew Laurance as Sal Amato (bassist)
- Helen Schneider as Joann Carlino
- David Wilson as Kenny Hopkins (drums)
- Michael "Tunes" Antunes as Wendell Newton (saxophone)
- Ellen Barkin as Maggie Foley
- Kenny Vance as Lew Eisen

In addition, the music producer/supervisor for the film, Kenny Vance, appears on screen as Lew Eisen, the 1964 record company executive who refuses to accept the band's second album.

In September 2018, Tommy Marz released a series of interviews he conducted with members of the film's cast, as well as members of the production team. The article highlighted the 35th anniversary of the film and details how life changed for the people involved.

== Production ==
=== Development ===
Martin Davidson has said that the inspiration for the film came from a desire to "get all my feelings about the music of the last 30 years of rock music into it." He optioned P. F. Kluge's novel with his own money and at great financial risk. He wrote the screenplay with Arlene Davidson and decided to use a Citizen Kane–style story structure. He remembered, "That was in my head: the search."

Davidson made a deal with Time-Life, a company that was going into the movie-making business. However, it quickly left the business after making two films that were not financially successful. He was understandably upset and a couple of days later he went out to dinner and met a secretary who had worked on his first film. He told her what had happened to his film, and she gave his script for Eddie and the Cruisers to her business partners. In a relatively short time, a deal was struck with Aurora and Davidson was given a $6 million budget.

=== Shooting ===
In order to get a credible looking and sounding band for the film, Davidson hired Kenny Vance, one of the original members of Jay and the Americans. He showed Davidson his scrapbook, the places the band performed, the car they drove, and how they transported their instruments. Vance also told Davidson stories about the band, some of which he incorporated into the script. Tom Berenger has said that he did not try to learn piano for the film but did practice keyboards for hours in his trailer. Matthew Laurance actually learned how to play the bass through rehearsals.

Michael Paré was discovered in a New York City restaurant working as a chef. He said of his role in the film that it was "a thrill I've never experienced. It's a really weird high. For a few moments, you feel like a king, a god. It's scary, a dangerous feeling. If you take it too seriously."

Davidson had the actors who played in Eddie Wilson (Paré)'s band rehearse as if they were getting ready for a real concert. Paré remembers, "The first time we played together—as a band—was a college concert. An odd thing happened. At first, the extras simply did what they were told. Then, as the music heated up, so did the audience. They weren't play-acting anymore. The screaming, stomping and applause became spontaneous." Davidson recalls, "One by one, kids began standing up in their seats, screaming and raising their hands in rhythmic applause. A few girls made a dash for the stage, tearing at Michael's shirt. We certainly hadn't told them to do that. But we kept the cameras rolling." Additionally, New Jersey musician Southside Johnny was hired as a technical advisor for the film.

Ellen Barkin, who has the small role of the television reporter, Maggie Foley, later said that she "hated" making the film:

That was what we liked to call a "pay the rent" job. It wasn't a script I liked, but I remember my agent at the time saying, "Look, you only have to work two weeks, and they're going to pay you a lot of money. We'll just say it was your first movie and they just didn't release it." I think people were all fucked up on drugs. I don't know. I was a little removed, because I wasn't on the movie the whole time, but it seemed like it was just a mess. Like, when I'd go, I'd think—I like to make a movie where I know who the boss is. I like a big boss. I like a real director. And it seemed like it was just, "Who's driving the ship here? What's going on?"

According to Davidson, when he completed the film, three different studios wanted to distribute it, and he went with Embassy Pictures because they offered him the most money. However, they had no prior experience in distribution and were unable to properly release it in theaters. Davidson remembered, "And six months later, somebody said, 'Your picture is appearing on HBO this weekend,' and I didn't even know."

== Soundtrack ==
Vance asked Davidson to describe his fictitious band and their music. Initially, Davidson said that the Cruisers sounded like Dion and the Belmonts, but when they meet Frank Ridgeway (Berenger), they have elements of Jim Morrison and The Doors. However, Davidson did not want to lose sight of the fact that the Cruisers were essentially a Jersey bar band, and he thought of Bruce Springsteen and the E Street Band. The filmmaker told Vance to find him someone that could produce music that contained elements of these three bands. Davidson was getting close to rehearsals when Vance called him and said that he had found the band—John Cafferty and the Beaver Brown Band from Providence, Rhode Island.

Davidson met the band and realized that they closely resembled the band as described in the script, right down to a Cape Verdean saxophone player Michael Antunes, whom he cast in the film. Initially, Cafferty was only hired to write a few songs for the film, but he did such a good job of capturing the feeling of the 1960s and 1980s that Davidson asked him to score the entire film.

After successful screenings on HBO in 1984, the album suddenly climbed the charts, going quadruple platinum. The studio re-released the soundtrack in the fall of 1984. Nine months after the film was released in theaters, the main song in the film, "On the Dark Side", was the number one song in the country on Billboard's Mainstream, Rock, and Heatseeker charts and #7 on the Billboard Hot 100 chart. Another single from the film, "Tender Years," peaked at #31 on the Billboard Hot 100.

== Reaction ==
Eddie and the Cruisers was originally intended to open during the summer, but a scheduling error resulted in a September release, when its target audience—teenagers—were back in school. The film had its world premiere at Deauville. Embassy Pictures threw a promotional party for the film at a dance club in West Hollywood in September 1983, where Cafferty and his band played.

The film was a box office flop, receiving many negative to mixed reviews from critics. The film was released in theaters on September 23, 1983, and grossed $1.4 million on its opening weekend. It would go on to make $4.7 million in North America. The film was pulled from theaters after three weeks and all of the promotional ads pulled after one week.

In the fall of 1984, the single "On the Dark Side" from the soundtrack album suddenly climbed the charts, as the film was rediscovered on cable television and home video, prompting the studio to briefly re-release the album.

== Critical reception ==
Eddie and the Cruisers was not well received by critics. As of October 2018, the film holds a rating of 38% on Rotten Tomatoes, based on 16 reviews.

Roger Ebert gave the film two out of four stars. He wrote, despite a good cast, "terrific" music and an intriguing concept, "the ending is so frustrating, so dumb, so unsatisfactory, that it gives a bad reputation to the whole movie."

In her review for The New York Times, Janet Maslin wrote, "Some of the details ring uncannily true, like the slick oldies nightclub act that one of the Cruisers is still doing nearly 20 years after Eddie's supposed death. Other aspects of the film are inexplicably wrong. Eddie's music sounds good, but it also sounds a lot like Bruce Springsteen's, and it would not have been the rage in 1963." However, she did praise Paré's performance: "Mr. Paré makes a fine debut; he captures the manner of a hot-blooded young rocker with great conviction, and his lip-synching is almost perfect."

Gary Arnold for The Washington Post wrote, "At any rate, it seemed to me that what Eddie and the Cruisers aspired to do was certainly worth doing. The problem is that it finally lacks the storytelling resources to tell enough of an intriguing story about a musical mystery man."

== Re-release ==
In 1984, Eddie and the Cruisers was discovered by additional audiences during its first pay cable run on HBO. Embassy Pictures re-released the film for one week based on successful summer cable screenings and a popular radio single, but it once again failed to perform at the box office. Looking back, Davidson said, "that picture should have been a theatrical success. There was an audience for it. People still watch it and still tell me about it."

Davidson was offered the job of directing a sequel to the film, but he was not keen on the idea and wanted no participation. The eventual project, which had no link to the Kluge source novel, was released as Eddie and the Cruisers II: Eddie Lives! in 1989.

== Home media ==
In 1984, Eddie and the Cruisers was released on VHS, CED and Laser videodisc by Embassy Home Entertainment.

== Bibliography ==
- Muir, John Kenneth. The Rock and Roll Film Encyclopedia. Applause Books, 2007.
