= On the Dark Side =

John Cafferty single

Single by John Cafferty and the Beaver Brown Band

from the album Eddie and the Cruisers
- B-side: "Wild Summer Nights"
- Released: September 1983 (original release); August 1984 (re-release)
- Recorded: 1982
- Genre: Rock
- Length: 2:54
- Label: Scotti Bros.
- Songwriter: John Cafferty
- Producers: Vince DiCola, Ed Fruge

John Cafferty & The Beaver Brown Band singles chronology
"Wild Summer Nights” / “Tender Years" (1980)	"On the Dark Side" (1983)	"Tender Years" (1984)

Music video
- "On the Dark Side" on YouTube

"On the Dark Side" is a song by fictional American rock band Eddie and the Cruisers, released as a tie-in to the 1983 film of the same name. When initially released in September 1983, the song peaked at No. 64 on the Billboard, while the film itself was pulled after three weeks in the theaters.

When the film was released to home video and pay cable outlets in early 1984, the film as well as the song received renewed interest, and the single was re-released that August. This time, the song reached No. 7 on the Billboard Hot 100 and No. 19 on Canada's RPM 100. It also lasted five weeks at No. 1 on the Billboard Rock Tracks chart, displacing The Fixx.

John Cafferty & The Beaver Brown Band served as the real-life, officially uncredited stand-ins for the fictional Cruisers on the recording (as they did for the rest of the soundtrack album); only one member of the band, saxophonist Michael Antunes, appeared in the film, and none of the other actors playing Eddie and the Cruisers were musicians.

== Chart performance ==
=== First US release (1983) ===
Chart (1983–1984)	Peak position
US Billboard Hot 100	64
US Cash Box Top 100	64

=== US re-release (1984) ===
Chart (1984)	Peak position
Canada Top Singles (RPM)	19
US Billboard Hot 100	7
US Billboard Top Rock Tracks	1
US Cash Box Top 100	12

=== Year-end charts ===
Chart (1984)	Position
U.S. Billboard Hot 100	94
U.S. Cash Box	89
