= P. F. Kluge =

Novelist and writer

P.F. Kluge
- Born: Paul Frederick Kluge; 1942 (age 83–84); New Jersey, U.S.
- Education: Kenyon College (BA)
- Occupation: Novelist
- Writing career
- Pen name: P.F. Kluge

Paul Frederick Kluge (born 1942; pronounced Klew-GEE) is an American novelist.

Kluge was raised in Berkeley Heights, New Jersey, and graduated from Jonathan Dayton High School, where he served as editor of the school paper. He graduated from Kenyon College in Gambier in 1964 and has taught creative writing there. He served in the Peace Corps until 1969 in Micronesia, after receiving a doctoral degree from the University of Chicago in 1967.

He is the author of several novels, including Eddie and the Cruisers, Biggest Elvis: A Novel (1997), A Season for War, MacArthur's Ghost, The Day I Die: A Novel of Suspense, Gone Tomorrow (2008), A Call from Jersey (2010), and The Master Blaster (2012). Kluge's oeuvre has been the subject of an entry in the Dictionary of Literary Biography.

Kluge's non-fiction work Alma Mater: A College Homecoming (1995) chronicles Kluge's time as a student and teacher at Kenyon College. The Edge of Paradise: America in Micronesia (1991) describes Kluge's return to Micronesia and his observations on how the American presence has affected the islands.

Two of Kluge's works have been made into films: Eddie and the Cruisers, based on his novel of the same name, and Dog Day Afternoon, based on a Life magazine article Kluge wrote with Thomas Moore entitled "The Boys in the Bank."
