= 10.0 Earthquake =

- Film poster
- Directed by: David Gidali
- Written by: J. Greg Abbott; Alex Greenfield; Nancy Leopardi
- Produced by: Steve Bencich; Ross Kohn; Nancy Leopardi
- Starring: Henry Ian Cusick; Cameron Richardson; Chasty Ballesteros; Kristen Dalton; Jeffrey Jones
- Cinematography: Damian Horan
- Edited by: Ruben Sebban
- Music by: Leo J. Russlan
- Distributed by: MarVista Entertainment
- Release date: October 7, 2014
- Running time: 87 minutes
- Country: United States
- Language: English

10.0 Earthquake is a 2014 American disaster film directed by David Gidali and starring Henry Ian Cusick and Jeffrey Jones.

== Plot ==
USGS scientist Emily Schiffman theorizes that a series of minor earthquakes are building up to a super quake that will sink the entire city of Los Angeles into a lava-filled chasm. Engineer Jack, whose deep fracking company is responsible for the quakes, feels obligated to help. He and Emily race through the increasingly damaged city in hopes of diverting the epicenter to Long Beach and potentially saving millions of lives, including Jack's daughter.

== Cast ==
- Henry Ian Cusick as Jack
- Jeffrey Jones as Marcus Gladstone
- Cameron Richardson as Emily Schiffman
- Chasty Ballesteros as Cindy
- Kristen Dalton as Stephanie
- Heather Sossaman as Nicole
- Olivia Jordan as Felicia
- David Chokachi as Ritter
- Malcolm Barrett as Mikal Booker
- Joey Luthman as Teddy Toblosky
- Scott Subiono as Paxton
- Terry Scannell as Hicks
- Brock Kelly as Derrick
- Rachel Sterling as Jazmine
- David Barrera as Hector
- David Michael Paul as Warner
- Jason Sims-Prewitt as Lt. Marquez

== Soundtrack ==
No.	Title	Writer(s)	Performer	Length
1.	"Surfing in the Morning"	Adam Abildgaard, Nick Duffy, Ted Davis	Hot Flash Heat Wave
2.	"Azucar"	Nick Ralph	The Sidekixx
3.	"Rum Runner"	Abildgaard, Duffy, Davis	Hot Flash Heat Wave
4.	"Voi Che Sapete"	Lorenzo da Ponte
5.	"Dirty Dreaming"	Abildgaard, Duffy, Davis	Hot Flash Heat Wave
6.	"Idea List"	Jason Leivian, Michael Newman	Lava
7.	"Mexican Polka Song"		Steve Rice
8.	"Waltz Opus 64 No 2"		Sergei Novikov
9.	"Salt Spray"	Abildgaard, Duffy, Davis	Hot Flash Heat Wave
10.	"Dreamwalker"		Gary Wolk
11.	"Humanwave"	Leivian, Newman	Lava
12.	"Hormone"	Leivian, Newman	Lava
13.	"Turning Blue"	Abildgaard, Duffy, Davis	Hot Flash Heat Wave
14.	"Jump Mix Demo C With Kicks"	George Kocovic	Geo Roc
