= Streets of Fire =

1984 film by Walter Hill

- Theatrical release poster
- Directed by: Walter Hill
- Written by: Walter Hill; Larry Gross
- Produced by: Lawrence Gordon; Joel Silver
- Starring: Michael Paré; Diane Lane; Rick Moranis; Amy Madigan
- Cinematography: Andrew Laszlo
- Edited by: James Coblentz; Freeman A. Davies; Michael Ripps; Michael Tronick
- Music by: Ry Cooder
- Production companies: RKO Pictures; Hill-Gordon-Silver Productions
- Distributed by: Universal Pictures
- Release date: June 1, 1984 (United States)
- Running time: 93 minutes
- Country: United States
- Language: English
- Budget: $14.5 million
- Box office: $8.1 million

Streets of Fire is a 1984 American action crime film directed by Walter Hill, from a screenplay by Hill and Larry Gross. Described on the poster and in the opening credits as "A Rock & Roll Fable", the film combines the culture and themes of the 1950s with the then-current 1980s. Starring Michael Paré, Diane Lane, Rick Moranis, Amy Madigan, Willem Dafoe, Deborah Van Valkenburgh, E.G. Daily, and Bill Paxton, the film follows ex-soldiers Tom Cody (Paré) and McCoy (Madigan) as they embark on a mission to rescue Cody's ex-girlfriend Ellen Aim (Lane), a rock singer who was kidnapped by Raven Shaddock (Dafoe), the leader of an outlaw motorcycle gang called the Bombers.

Streets of Fire was theatrically released in the United States on June 1, 1984, to mixed reviews from critics and was a box office failure, grossing $8.1 million against its $14.5 million production budget. The film was intended to be the first installment of a planned trilogy titled The Adventures of Tom Cody, but the project was ultimately dropped due to the film's critical and commercial performance. An unofficial sequel, Road to Hell, was released in 2008, with Paré and Van Valkenburgh reprising their roles.

== Plot ==
In Richmond, a city district in a near future dystopian time period that resembles the 1950s (labelled "another time, another place"), Ellen Aim, lead singer of the rock band Ellen Aim and the Attackers, has returned home for a concert. The Bombers, a biker gang from another part of town called the Battery, led by Raven Shaddock, crash the concert and kidnap Ellen.

Witnessing this is Reva Cody, who telegrams her brother Tom, an ex-soldier and Ellen's ex-boyfriend, asking him to come home. Upon his return, Tom defeats a small gang of greasers and takes their car. Reva tries to convince him to rescue Ellen, but he refuses. Tom then goes to a local tavern, the Blackhawk, where he meets a tomboyish mechanic and ex-soldier named McCoy and lets her stay with him and Reva. That night, Tom has a change of heart and agrees to talk to Ellen's manager and current boyfriend, Billy Fish, about rescuing her.

While Reva and McCoy go to the diner where Reva works, Tom acquires a cache of weapons, including a pump action shotgun, a revolver, and a lever action rifle. Tom meets Billy at the diner, and Billy agrees to pay him $10,000, but Tom also requires that Billy accompany him into the Battery to get Ellen, since he used to live there. McCoy also talks Tom into cutting her in for 10% in exchange for her help.

In the Battery, they go to Torchie's, a club where Billy used to book bands and where Raven has Ellen tied up in an upstairs bedroom. McCoy enters and is led upstairs by one of the Bombers, whom she knocks out before holding Raven and some of his gang members at gunpoint. Meanwhile, Tom creates a diversion outside by shooting the gas tanks on the gang's motorcycles and then rescues Ellen. Tom sends Ellen off with McCoy and Billy in the convertible, telling them to meet him at the Grant Street underpass, and blows up the gas pumps outside a bar. Raven confronts Tom and warns him that he will be coming for Ellen and for him, too. Tom escapes on the one intact motorcycle and meets up with the others.

The group is joined by "Baby Doll", a fan of Ellen's, who warns them that the police are looking for the people who were behind the attack at Torchie's. To escape, the group hijacks the tour bus of a doo-wop group called the Sorels. The bus is stopped by a police blockade. Billy tries to get rid of the corrupt police officers by bribing them, but Tom and McCoy have to resort to holding the police at gunpoint and shooting up their vehicles. The group, along with the Sorels, ditch the bus and take a train back to Richmond.

Raven meets with Ed Price, the head of the police department, and promises him no more trouble if he arranges for Tom to meet with him alone. Price plans on arresting Raven, so he tells Tom to get out of town to avoid more violence. Tom goes to the hotel where Ellen and Billy are staying to collect his reward, but he takes only McCoy's cut and throws the rest back at Billy. As Tom storms out, Ellen follows and the two embrace in the rain. After having sex, Tom and Ellen discuss the possibility of eloping.

Price, with reinforcements, is about to arrest Raven but is ambushed by an overwhelming number of Bombers. Meanwhile, Ellen is on a train with Tom and McCoy, believing that Tom is leaving with her, but he knocks out Ellen and returns to town to confront Raven. Tom and Raven duel using sledgehammers and their fists, with Tom being victorious. The defeated gang carries their leader away. Later, at a concert, the Sorels open for Ellen and her band. Tom tells Billy that Ellen needs him more than she needs Tom, and the two bid each other a cordial goodbye. Tom then says farewell to Ellen, promising that he'll always be there for her if she needs him. Ellen performs on stage, while Tom rides off with McCoy.

== Cast ==
- Michael Paré as Tom Cody
- Diane Lane as Ellen Aim
- Rick Moranis as Billy Fish
- Amy Madigan as McCoy
- Willem Dafoe as Raven Shaddock
- Deborah Van Valkenburgh as Reva Cody
- Richard Lawson as Ed Price
- Rick Rossovich as Officer Cooley
- Bill Paxton as Clyde
- Lee Ving as Greer
- Ed Begley Jr. as Ben Gunn
- Stoney Jackson as "Bird"
- Mykelti Williamson as B.J.
- Lynne Thigpen as Subway Motorwoman
- Grand Bush as Reggie
- Robert Townsend as Lester
- E.G. Daily as "Baby Doll"

== Production ==
=== Development ===
The concept for Streets of Fire came together during the making of 48 Hrs., and reunited director Walter Hill with screenwriter Larry Gross, and producers Lawrence Gordon and Joel Silver, all of whom worked together on that production. Gross later recalled:

Streets of Fire began in the euphoria of knowing that Paramount really liked 48 and wanted to be in business with us if they could. What happened was that after we screened that cut for Paramount, Larry looked at Walter and said, "Paramount is pregnant; let's get something and set it up right away." Walter knew what he meant—that we were in a great position here—so he said, "We can do this two ways: present an idea now and get a deal done, or write a script on spec and get a lot more money." Walter proudly considers himself a capitalist, so he suggested we do the latter.

According to Hill, the film's origins came out of a desire to make what he thought was a perfect film when he was a teenager, and put in all of the things that he thought were "great then and which I still have great affection for: custom cars, kissing in the rain, neon, trains in the night, high-speed pursuit, rumbles, rock stars, motorcycles, jokes in tough situations, leather jackets and questions of honor".

According to Gross, Hill wanted to make a film about a comic book hero, but since he did not like "any of the comic books" he had read, he wanted it to be an original character. "He wanted to create his own 'comic book movie', without the source material actually being a comic book", said Gross, which led to the creation of Tom Cody.

=== Writing ===
The four men began planning Streets of Fire while completing 48 Hrs. Gross published a diary from the shoot of 48 Hrs. which had an entry dated 12 August 1982, the night before filming on that movie started:

Walter presents me with a page of notes he's prepared for a new script. It will be the first in a series of adventures of an action hero he's had it in his mind to create for a long time. The character's name is Tom Cody. And Walter has it in his head to create a franchise about him...introducing him as The Stranger. He asks me if I'm interested in writing the script with him...I ask him is the Pope Catholic? Larry [Gordon] and Joel [Silver] would be along on this ride. Suits me.

During 48 Hrs., Gross said he thought that Hill had received "a bum rap on the woman question" over the years. "People think that he doesn't like women and he knows that's not true. I think that's going to be demonstrated even more clearly in his next films. He told me he's going to do this new thing: he's going to put a female character right in the center of the narrative."

Gross later said they were affected "as everyone was at the time" by the success of Flashdance and they decided during writing that the film would be a musical:

We said this movie is a stylized movie, it's not so different from the world of a musical. And there were a few other things that contributed to that direction. One was the decision on Universal's part, a crazy decision, to shoot the movie almost entirely in the studio under a tarpaulin. They built this gigantic tarpaulin, and the Battery and all these other places were built as real places. The Richlands. And just so you know, this is the early ’80s and you had stylized films—like New York, New York—that were all done on set and that idea was in the air. That idea of a totally artificial universe. The point is that we had in mind one sentence inspired by George Lucas: "in a galaxy long ago", a futuristic past. That was in our heads...there's the past and there's the future, sort of.

Hill thought "the audience will go with you when you set up an abstract world with teenage values and play out a drama within this. It was kind of real but it wasn't really. I always said whenever someone says fantasy they immediately think of more Disney-esque. The idea of a hard hitting drama in a fantasy world, that was kind of different at the time... I always thought of it as a musical. They kind of saw it worked in the world of an MTV video."

Gross says he and Hill were also influenced by the teen films of John Hughes.

We were in the universe of the teenage movie. Teenage reality. So we said here's what's going to be weird about the world of our movie: No one's going to be over 30. The world is a high school, essentially. And Tom Cody will be the football hero. And Willem Dafoe is the greaser. Remember: You had John Hughes at the time, and then you had Coppola making two high school movies: The Outsiders and Rumble Fish. So Walter said we’re going to make a high school movie that's also going to be a comic book and also going to be a musical.

Gross says Hill did not want the film to be too violent. As a result, it was decided that no blood would be shown and none of the characters would die. "He'd say it would be inappropriate to direct this movie if there were any blood", said Gross. "We’re in the world of Cocteau, we’re in the world of Beauty and the Beast. This is a fairy tale. Now...he neglected to mention that some fairy tales are very violent."

Gross and Hill would work out their ideas in detail. Gross would do a draft and Hill would rewrite it. "He did not love creating scripts from scratch; he loved rewriting." By this stage however, Gross and Hill had worked together so closely Gross says "I began to develop a strong sense for knowing how to sound like he did."

=== Financing ===
When the script was finished, they sent it to Paramount. Gross says that Jeff Berg, Hill's agent, Larry Gordon, and Michael Eisner, head of production at Paramount, "got into some kind of a fight when the script was finished. We learned later that, I believe, Eisner rejected it on the grounds that it was too similar to Indiana Jones conceptually. So they didn't pull the trigger and Berg ended up selling it to Universal."

They submitted the script to Universal executive Bob Rehme in January 1983, and by the end of the weekend, the studio had greenlit the production. This was the fastest greenlight Hill had ever received for a film, and he owed the decision to the box office success of 48 Hrs.

=== The title ===
The film's title came from a song written and recorded by Bruce Springsteen on his 1978 album Darkness on the Edge of Town. Negotiations with Springsteen for rights to the song delayed production several times. Originally, plans were made for the song to be featured on the film's soundtrack, to be sung by Ellen Aim at the end of the film, but when Springsteen was told that the song would be re-recorded by other vocalists, he withdrew permission for the song to be used. Jim Steinman was brought in to write the opening and closing songs, and "Streets of Fire" was replaced by "Tonight Is What It Means to Be Young". The studio claimed that they replaced Springsteen's song because it was a "downer".

=== Casting ===
When it came to casting the movie, Hill wanted to go with a young group of relative unknowns. Gross says "There was always the idea that we were going to discover a new Steve McQueen, you know? A young, white guy who would ride a motorcycle and have a carbine over his shoulder and be a mainstream icon." Among the actors they saw for the role of Tom Cody were Tom Cruise, Eric Roberts, and Patrick Swayze. Gross says they wanted Cruise and made him an offer, but he had already accepted another role.

Hill heard about Michael Paré from Hildy Gottlieb, his then-girlfriend and later wife who was also the same agent who recommended Eddie Murphy to him for 48 Hrs. At the time he was cast in March 1983, Paré had appeared in two films, Eddie and the Cruisers and Undercover, which had not yet been released. For Hill, Paré "had the right quality. He was the only actor I found who was right for the part ...a striking combination of toughness and innocence." Paré said of his character, "He's someone who can come in and straighten everything out."

The character of Ellen Aim was written as a 28-year-old woman. Gross says they wanted Daryl Hannah, but were unable to do a deal in time. Diane Lane read for the part when she was 18. Hill was reluctant to cast her because he felt that she was too young for the role. Hill met Lane in New York City and she auditioned for him in black leather pants, a black mesh top and high-heeled boots. He was surprised with her "total commitment to selling herself as a rock 'n' roll star". The actress had been in more than 10 films by the time she did Streets of Fire. She described her character as "the first glamorous role I've had". Hill was so impressed with her work on the film that he wrote additional scenes for her during the shoot. "We were very excited about Diane Lane because she was starring in two excitedly hyped Francis Ford Coppola pictures that were being done in Oklahoma", says Gross, referring to The Outsiders and Rumble Fish. "So we had the approval of sort of picking the person that Francis Ford Coppola picked."

Amy Madigan originally read for Reva, Cody's sister, and told Hill and Silver that she wanted to play the role of McCoy which, she remembers, "was written to be played by an overweight male who was a good soldier and really needed a job. It could still be tough and strong and have a woman do it without rewriting the part." Hill liked the idea and cast her.

Willem Dafoe was recommended by Kathryn Bigelow, who had recently directed him in The Loveless (1981). Bigelow was dating David Giler, a collaborator and friend of Hill at the time. Gross later said he thought Dafoe "may have been the best thing about the film."

=== Filming ===
Production began on location in Chicago in April 1983, then moved to Los Angeles for 45 days, and finally two weeks at a soap factory in Wilmington, with additional filming taking place at Universal Studios. Shooting wrapped on August 18, 1983. All 10 days of filming in Chicago were exteriors at night, on locations that included platforms of elevated subway lines and the depths of Lower Wacker Drive. For Hill, the subways and their look was crucial to the world of the film and represented one of three modes of transportation—the other two being cars and motorcycles.

While shooting in Chicago, the production was plagued by inclement weather that included rain, hail, snow, and a combination of all three. The subway scenes were filmed on location in Chicago at many locations, including LaSalle Street (Blue line), Lake Street (Green line), Sheridan Road (Red, Purple lines), and Belmont Avenue (Red, Brown, and Purple lines). The Damen Avenue stop (Blue line, at Damen, North, and Milwaukee Avenues) was used.

Production designer John Vallone and his team constructed an elevated train line on the backlot of Universal Studios that perfectly matched the ones in Chicago. The film crew tarped-in the New Street and Brownstone street sets to double for the Richmond District setting, completely covering them so that night scenes could be filmed during the day. This tarp measured 1,240 feet long by 220 feet wide over both sets, and cost $1.2 million to construct. However, this presented unusual problems. The sound of the tarp flapping in the wind interfered with the actors’ dialogue. Birds who had nested in the tarp provided their own noisy interruptions.

The exterior of the Richmond Theater where Ellen Aim sings at the beginning of the film was shot on the backlot, with the interior done in the Wiltern Theater in Los Angeles for two weeks. The Ardmore Police roadblock was filmed near 6th Street in East Los Angeles, near the flood basin. Although three districts are seen, the city has a total of five districts: the Richmond, the Strip, the Battery, the Cliffside, and the Bayside. An additional district, Ardmore, also appears in the film, but it may be a separate municipality as it is not prefaced with "the".

The production employed 500 extras to play the citizens of the Richmond District. Cinematographer Andrew Laszlo shot the film with very low light, giving the images a stark, "low-tech" quality. The choreography for the two songs Ellen Aim sings and the one by the Sorels was done by Jeffrey Hornaday. The lighting for these concert scenes were done by Mark Brickman, who also lit concerts for Bruce Springsteen and Pink Floyd. In addition, 12 1950 and 1951 model Studebakers were used as police cars. More than 50 motorcycles and their drivers were featured as the Bombers, and were chosen from 200 members of real Los Angeles-based clubs like The Crusaders and The Heathens.

According to Laszlo, the film's style was dictated by the story. The Richmond's look was very soft and the colors did not call attention to themselves. The light in The Battery was contrasting and harsh, with vivid colors. Argyle prints and plaids are used in the Parkside District, and neon lights color the Strip.

Hill later said he felt "humbled" by the shoot:

I think I thought I could handle things. Didn't know how to shoot music. Music had been important in my films, it was usually post production. This was tough stuff to shoot. I already had a great respect for people like Minnelli. I just couldn't seem to work it out without just putting up multiple cameras and shooting an awful lot of film... I later realized or talked to people about this and MGM in the old days everybody was on contract and they would rehearse for weeks. We don't get that. We would stage it and shoot it. We got the songs a lot of times just a few days before we shoot. We only get the final song. The structural advantage of the old studio system we didn't have. It made a very inefficient shoot. I don't think there was any other way to do it given the circumstances.

Due to the choreography and setups in between takes of every scene, the climactic four-minute showdown between Cody and Raven Shaddock (Dafoe) took a considerable time to shoot. Paré estimated it as four weeks:

Willem and I shot that for two weeks, and then Walter shot it for another two week with the stunt guys. That whole scene was a Walter thing. He had to do something like that, especially after what he had done in Hard Times (1975).

Michael Paré later recalled:

You gotta realize that, out of the whole cast, nobody was over thirty. Diane Lane was, I think, eighteen. It was an enormous Hollywood production. My manager had me hire a limousine to pick me up at home and take me to work. I was like, "Jesus, this is incredible. This is... Hollywood. The real Hollywood. The Hollywood they make movies about." ... It was scary. And Walter isn't the kind of guy who works well with kids. He's a cowboy. He's like John Ford. "Don't ask me how to act! I'm a director!" (Laughs)

Paré also said he had troubles with Rick Moranis:

Rick Moranis drove me out of my mind. There's this whole wave of insult comedy. In the real world, if someone insults you a couple of times, you can smack them. Or punch them. You can't do that on a movie set. And these comedians walk around, and they can say whatever they want. I'm just not that handy with that. Comedians are a special breed. They can antagonize you and say whatever they...want, and you can't do anything to stop them...He's this weird looking little guy who couldn't get laid in a whore house with a fistful of fifties. He would imitate me. The first thing he says to me is "Do you just act cool, or are you really cool?" That was the first sentence out of his mouth to me in Joel Silver's office. And I was like, "Oh...this is not going to go well." But he was one of Joel's dear friends, and he ended up making a bunch of movies for Disney. I just wasn't that sharp. I wasn't ready for that kind of crap.

Paré said that the original draft of the script had Tom Cody kill Raven with a knife. "Walter really liked the idea because it had Tom Cody winning at all costs." However, this was changed to a fair fight to ensure a PG rating.

Paré did not always work well with Hill:

I think Walter is a writer at heart. Writers aren't always that good at communicating in person. He's also a tough son-of-a-bitch. He's like a cowboy. His director's chair was made out of leather and on the back of it read "Lone Wolf". He used to frequent gun clubs and he wasn't a very delicate guy...We were doing a love scene. When they said "We need to loop the love scene." I really freaked out. I had never done a love scene before...I really needed help to get through it. I panicked, and Joel Silver, called Walter and somehow persuaded him to come over and direct me through the ADR. Streets of Fire was a big picture for me, and I was overwhelmed. I think that bothered Walter. I think he thought that I was a needy guy. He was used to working with actors who had experience like Nick Nolte or David Carradine. I've always wondered why Walter has never wanted to work with me again. I think he was too much of gentlemen to tell me that I was too needy at the time.

E. G. Daily, who played Baby Doll, says it was "a very frustrating thing for me" to not sing in the film "Because Diane Lane was singing, and I remember thinking 'Ah!' It was so frustrating for me. It was painful. Because I wanted to be on that stage singing with those guys...But back then I always played those quirky characters. I didn't get those fancy leads. I got those best friend of the leads, quirky, funny characters. Hookers with a heart of gold. Weirdos."

Gross and Hill met with the editors on the weekends and looked at footage. Gross recalls that about five weeks into the 14-week shoot:

I turned to Walter and said "This movie is somewhat weirder than we thought...We just didn't anticipate what the combination of elements was going to be. We had a very conscious design concept of the movie, but I think we didn't fully grasp how strong it would be, in terms of the combination of elements. In a way, I think Streets of Fire was about expanding The Warriors concept to a bigger stage. But when expanding it to a bigger scale, it changed. The movie's bigness of size—compositionally—changed the meaning of things and made it more of a fairy tale...The Warriors, it was bewoven with a unique sense of realism. The fact that they made a deal with real gangs to be extras in the film. There was a true Godardian dialectic going on between artifice and reality. It's a very real-world film, in some respects, but it's very artificial at the same time... We did that again, but we put the emphasis on the artifice. And we didn't fully...I want to say we had too much integrity. We went further with that, perhaps, than we should have. I don't know. I can't put everything together about what didn't work, but the most damaging thing is that we didn't have the right actor for Tom Cody. Maybe if we'd had Tom Cruise, we might have had a success. But our commitment to be stylized was thorough and conscious and maybe too extreme for the mainstream audience.

Gross also wrote that "there was a chance of something great, but early fundamental disappointment with key personnel (in that case the star, Michael Paré) steeled all of us to face the chance that it might not turn out that way."

== Music ==
The soundtrack album was released by MCA Records on May 29, 1984, and features the hit single "I Can Dream About You" by Dan Hartman.

== Release ==
=== Reaction ===
Larry Gross recalls the filmmakers were optimistic prior to release:

We all knew in our hearts that Michael was disappointing. We felt that we had compensated adequately in making a fun, exciting, stylized world. You know, I was disappointed in one aspect: a voiceover from Tom's sister that we had, which Walter later decided to cut. Um, there were a couple of things in the narrative that I felt went out that probably should have stayed in. At the same time, I was myself knocked out by what Walter and (cinematographer) Andy Laszlo and our editor were doing visually on the film. And I felt, as I watched the post-production process going on, I just saw the film getting better and better. More impressive. To the point where I thought it was going to do well. And I thought that we had done what we set out to do. Created the world that we set out to create.... It was a movie that was built to succeed. It's funny. The movie screened very, very well. I remember, after the first screenings, people told me that I was going to be rich for life. There was tremendous love and confidence.

== Reception ==
=== Box office ===
Streets of Fire fared poorly at the box office, opening in 1,150 theaters on June 1, 1984, and grossing $2.4 million during its first weekend. After 10 days, it made $4.5 million, while fellow opener Star Trek III: The Search for Spock grossed $34.8 million in the same time.

Gross says Hill was making Brewster's Millions at the time. "Joel got off the phone with Universal and said, 'We're dead.' We sat down, I remember, in a little park. In downtown LA. And we started giggling, in that way people do when things are terrible...there's the song in the movie called 'Tonight Is What It Means to Be Young'. And I remember, in the park, Joel saying, 'Today Is What It Means to be Dead'."

The film went on to make a total of $8 million in North America, compared to a production budget of $14.5 million.

"I was shattered when the film didn't perform", said Gross. "That broke my heart...I hoped, by the time the movie finished, that it would be whipped into a shape and design that would have a real impact. And then it didn't, and that was sad."

=== Critical response ===
On the review aggregator website Rotten Tomatoes, 69% of 32 critics' reviews are positive. The website's consensus reads: "Streets of Fire may sometimes buckle under the strain of its ambitious fusion of disparate genres, but Walter Hill's bravura style gives this motorcycle musical fuel to burn." On Metacritic, which uses a weighted average, the film holds a score of 59 out of 100 based on 14 critics, indicating "mixed or average" reviews.

Janet Maslin of The New York Times criticized the film's screenplay as being "misogynistic" and "problematically crude."

Gary Arnold wrote in The Washington Post that as "romantic leads, Paré and Lane are pretty much a washout", and that "most of the action climaxes are treated as such throwaways that you begin to wonder if they bored the director."

Jay Scott wrote in The Globe and Mail that "when Streets of Fire is speeding by like Mercury on methedrine, the rush left in its wake cancels out questions of content. But the minute the momentum slows, it's another story—a story about a movie with no story at all."

In an essay for Film Comment, David Chute wrote, "It's probably impossible not to enjoy the movie. No director holds a candle to Hill for sheer visceral expertise. But the moods didn't linger. It's such a hard-shelled picture that it barely has moods."

Roger Ebert of the Chicago Sun-Times gave Streets of Fire 3 stars out of a possible 4, praising the soundtrack and set design, and noting the "broadly symbolic" performances which embodied a struggled between good and evil. He also wrote: "the language is strange, too: It's tough, but not with 1984 toughness. It sounds like the way really mean guys would have talked in the late 1950s, only with a few words different—as if this world evolved a slightly different language."

=== Legacy ===
Screenwriter Larry Gross said the film has been influential:

Whatever is good, bad or indifferent about Streets of Fire, it had a huge impact on other filmmakers. The two movies that came out in the years after that are completely saturated in the iconography of Streets of Fire are RoboCop and Se7en. Se7en's taking place in another world. It's not New York. It's not Chicago. A world where it's raining all the time. Always dark. Always night, just about. Those are two very successful movies that figured out how to do the stylization with the appropriate amount of gore that they hooked the audience. And I think that if we'd done more gore, our chances of hooking the audience would be greater.

Streets of Fire has a number of similarities to Capcom's hit 1989 beat 'em up video game Final Fight. In a 2007 interview, Retro Gamer magazine asked the game's designer Akira Nishitani about the similarities. Nishitani said that, at the time, the team were not "aware of Streets of Fire, but I've Googled it and there does indeed seem to be something familiar about it" but that "this style of story was very popular back then" and many "fighting games made use of it" so "I guess we were part of that crowd!" Conversely, Akira Yasuda (the game's planner) states on his personal website that he based Final Fight protagonist Cody Travers on Michael Paré's Tom Cody.

Streets of Fire also inspired early anime set in cyberpunk and other associated genres. The OVA miniseries Megazone 23 and the original OVA version of Bubblegum Crisis are both notable examples of this. At one point, the main character in the former, Shougo Yahagi, even watches the movie in-universe, while the opening sequence to the latter's first episode is heavily lifted from that of the film.

=== Accolades ===
==== Awards ====
Sitges Film Festival

- Best Actress: Amy Madigan (1984)

Kinema Junpo Awards

- Best Foreign Language Film: Walter Hill

==== Nominations ====
Golden Raspberry

- Worst Supporting Actress: Diane Lane (for this film and The Cotton Club) (1984)

== Possible sequels ==
Streets of Fire was intended to be the first in a projected trilogy titled The Adventures of Tom Cody, with Hill's tentatively titling the two sequels The Far City and Cody's Return.

The Streets of Fire script concluded with the expectation that Streets of Fire will be followed by The Long Night, Book Two in The Adventures of Tom Cody.

Paré later recalled:

They told me that it was going to be a trilogy. What happened was that all of the people that made Streets of Fire left Universal Studios and went to 20th Century Fox. It was made at Universal, so they owned the rights to the story. So it was left behind. I was told by Joel Silver that the sequel was going to be set in the snow, and the following film would be set in the desert.

However, the film's failure at the box office put an end to the project. In an interview, shortly after the film's release, Paré said, "Everyone liked it, and then all of a sudden they didn't like it. I was already worried about whether I should do the sequel or not."

=== Road to Hell ===
An unofficial sequel titled Road to Hell was made in 2008, directed by Albert Pyun, and with Paré playing Tom Cody, and Deborah Van Valkenburgh playing his sister Reva Cody.

== See also ==
- Big in Japan (phrase)
