= Deborah Van Valkenburgh =

American actress

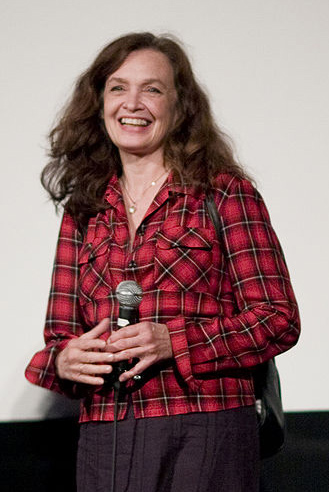
- Van Valkenburgh at the Alamo Drafthouse screening of Streets of Fire (2008)
- Born: August 29, 1952 (age 74)
- Education: Pratt Institute (BFA)
- Occupation: Actress
- Years active: 1973–present
- Known for: Too Close for Comfort; The Warriors; Road to Hell
- Website: deborahvanvalkenburghofficial.com

Deborah Van Valkenburgh (born August 29, 1952) is an American actress best known for her screen debut as Mercy in the 1979 cult film The Warriors, and her role as Jackie Rush for five seasons (1980–1985) on the television situation comedy Too Close for Comfort. In 2012, she won the Best Supporting Actress in a Fantasy Film award at the PollyGrind Underground Film Festival for the film Road to Hell.

== Education ==
Van Valkenburgh graduated from Pratt Institute in Brooklyn, New York, with a BFA in painting and drawing.

== Career ==
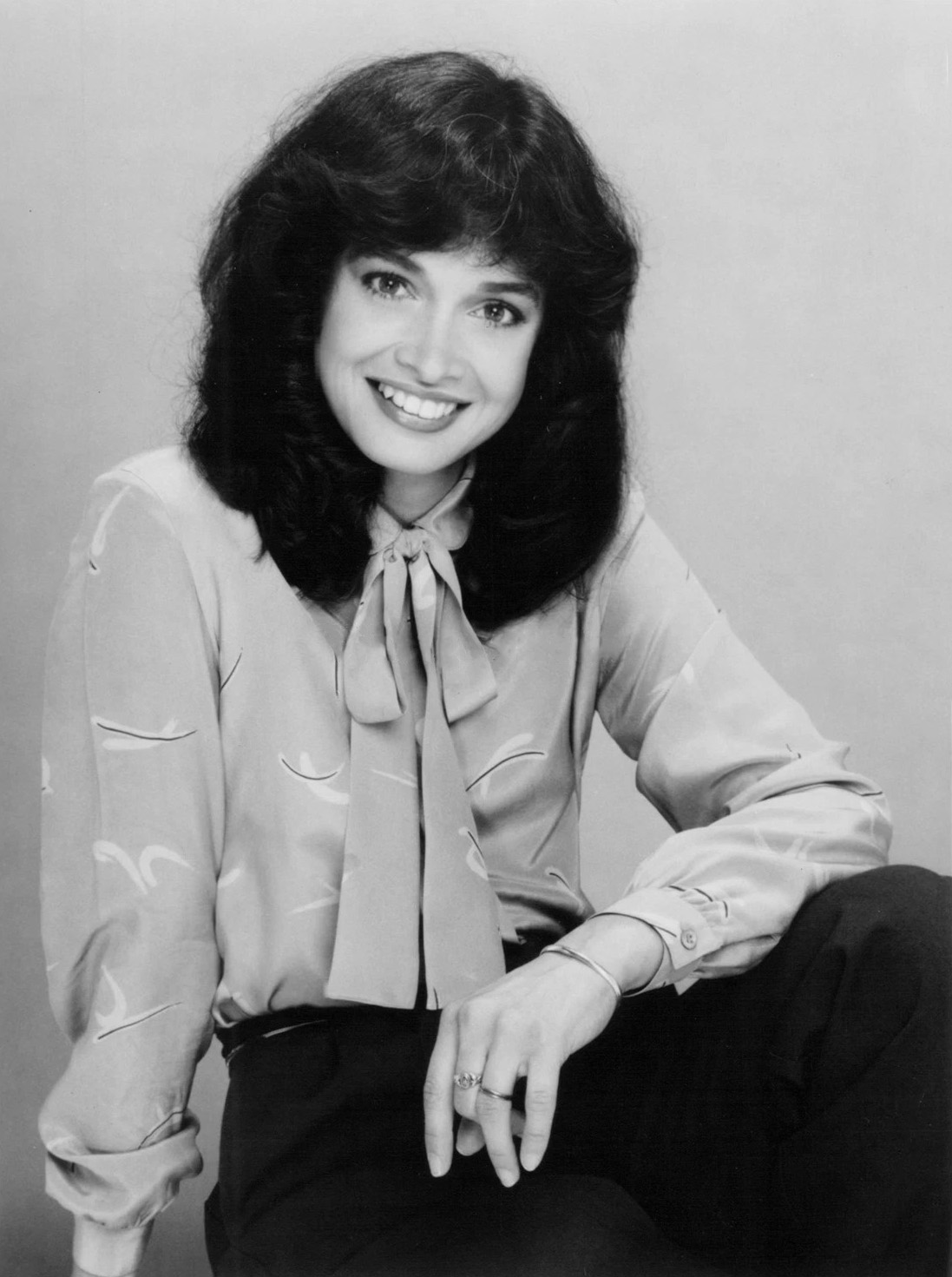
Van Valkenburgh as Jackie Rush in Too Close For Comfort, 1981

She started her acting career on Broadway performing in "Hair". Van Valkenburgh also appeared in Off-Broadway plays, including Honeybee, The Tempest, Six Characters in Search of an Author, Hay Fever, When Did You last See Your Mother?, Iolanthe, It Ain't Aardvark, and Minutemen. Besides acting in many New York plays, she has acted in regional and touring company productions of Mooney's Kid Don't Cry, The Children's Hour, and A View From the Bridge. Van Valkenburgh has studied acting with William Esper and John Shea, ballet with Ballet Arts Carnegie Hall and modern dance with James Cunningham. She also studied puppet production with Jim Henson, voice with Kirk Nurock and Richard Green, and improvisation with Dan Richter.

== Filmography ==
=== Film ===
Year	Title	Role	Notes
1979	The Warriors	Mercy	
1981	King of the Mountain	Tina	
1984	Streets of Fire	Reva Cody	
1987	Rampage	Kate Fraser	
1988	Phantom of the Ritz	Nancy Drawing	
1989	One Man Out	Liliana	
1993	Brainsmasher... A Love Story	Cammy Crain	Direct-to-video
1997	Mean Guns	Cam	
1998	Sorcerers	Mother	
1999	Free Enterprise	Marlena	
2003	Venus Conspiracy	Zoe	Short film
2004	Criminal	Woman In Elevator	
2005	The Devil's Rejects	Casey	
2008	Road to Hell	Reva Cody	
2009	Broken Hart	Gypsy Woman	Short film
2013	Love's Routine	Cynthia	Short film
2013	The Trials of Cate McCall	Justice Wender	

=== Television ===
Year	Title	Role	Notes
1980–1985	Too Close for Comfort	Jackie Rush	107 episodes
1984	Match Game-Hollywood Squares Hour	Herself	With Cast of Too Close for Comfort
1985	A Bunny's Tale	Pearl	Television film
1985	Going for the Gold: The Bill Johnson Story	Kimberly	Television film
1985	Hotel	Camila Palandrini	Episode: "Resolutions"
1985	Glitter	Billie	Episode: "Rock 'n Roll Heaven"
1986	New Love, American Style	Unknown	Episode: "Love and the Pot Luck Dinner"
1987	Houston Knights	Louise Smoke	Episode: "Lady Smoke"
1987	Crime Story	Luca's Attorney	Episode: "Shockwaves"
1988	Cagney & Lacey	Valerie Bailey	Episode: "Button, Button"
1988	C.A.T. Squad: Python Wolf	Nikki Pappas	Television film
1989	HeartBeat	Lorraine	Episode: "Prison"
1990	MacGyver	Sandra Masters	Episode: "Rush to Judgement"
1990	Monsters	Deborah Levitt	Episode: "Household Gods"
1992	Bodies of Evidence	Donna Flint	Episode: "Echoes in the Dark"
1992	Picket Fences	Myra Marino	Episode: "Pilot"
1993	Quantum Leap	Diana St. Cloud	Episode: "Liberation - October 16, 1968"
1995	Star Trek: Deep Space Nine	Detective Preston	Episode: "Past Tense: Part II"
1995	The Marshal	Unknown	Episode: "Grab the Money and Run"
1998	Chicago Hope	Robin Kleiman	Episode: "Sarindipity"
2001	The Huntress	911 Operator #4	Episode: "Black Widow"
2001	Chasing Destiny	Suzy Aquado	Television film
2002	Firestarter: Rekindled	Mary Conant	Television miniseries
2002	Once and Again	Ms. Gonzalez	Episode: "The Gay-Straight Alliance"
2004	ER	Louise Garvin	Episode: "White Guy, Dark Hair"
2005	Mystery Woman: Mystery Weekend	Beth	Television film
2005	The Shield	Gail	Episode: "Bang"
2005	Cold Case	Geraldine	Episode: "Start-Up"
2006	Our House	Ms. Thomas	Television film
2006	Standoff	Goldstein	Episode: "Life Support"
2006	Criminal Minds	Betty	Episode: "The Last Word"
2008	Backwoods	Mother Ruth	Television film
2008	The Governor's Wife	Vera	Television film
2009	The Unit	Madam	Episode: "Unknown Soldier"
2009	Without a Trace	Margot	Episode: "True"
2009	The Ex List	Arlene Dubinski	Episode: "Momma's Boy"
2010	Ghost Whisperer	Madame Greta Hanson	Episode: "Old Sins Cast Long Shadows"
2010	Healing Hands	Leah Gardner	Television film
2010	Days of Our Lives	Rae	2 episodes
2010	Law & Order: LA	Liz Knight	Episode: "Harbor City"
2010–2011	The Event	Candice Larson	3 episodes
2011	Castle	Ruth Spurloch	Episode: "Cuffed"
2012	Touch	Dee Dee	Episode: "Music of the Spheres"
2014	Chop Shop	Mrs. Grabowsky	Episode: #1.3
2014	Stalker	Eleanor	Episode: "Skin"
2015	The Messengers	Gladys Cowan	Episode: "Why We Fight"
2019	Hidden in Plain Sight	Evelyn	Television film
2020	Helstrom	Esther Smith	Recurring

== Broadway ==
- 1977 Broadway revival of Hair, original cast

== Video games ==
Year	Title	Role	Notes
2005	The Warriors	Mercy	

== Awards and nominations ==
Awards
Year	Award	Category	Production	Result
2012	PollyGrind Film Festival Award	Supporting Actress in a Fantasy Film	Road to Hell	Won
