= Road to Hell (film) =

- Directed by: Albert Pyun
- Written by: Cynthia Curnan, Ph.D.
- Produced by: Cynthia Curnan, Ph.D. Tony Riparetti; Sazzy Lee Calhoun; Paul Rosenblum
- Starring: Michael Paré; Deborah Van Valkenburgh; Clare Kramer; Courtney Peldon; Joei Fulco; Roxy Gunn
- Cinematography: Michael Su; Jim Hagopian
- Music by: Tony Riparetti; The Roxy Gunn Project
- Production companies: Curnan Pictures; Sound Logic Recording; Filmwerks
- Distributed by: Wrekin Hill Entertainment; Moonstone Entertainment; Independent Pictures
- Release date: 2008
- Running time: 87 minutes
- Country: United States
- Language: English
- Box office: $1,440.00

Road to Hell is a 2008 action-fantasy film directed by Albert Pyun. It was inspired by Walter Hill's Streets of Fire and began shooting that same year in June at Los Angeles. Pyun states that the genesis of Road to Hell was when he and Paré attended a film festival in Spain.

== Cast ==
- Michael Paré as Tom Cody
- Deborah Van Valkenburgh as Reva Cody, Tom's sister
- Clare Kramer as Caitlin
- Courtney Peldon as Ashley
- Anita Leeman as Ellen Aim
- Lauren Sutherland as McCoy
- Joei Fulco as Gabriel The Archangel
- Roxy Gunn as Ellen Dream
- Chris Reject as DJ Dante
- Paige Lauren Billiot as "Honey Dew"
- Nicholas Lahesich as "Baby Doll"
- Norbert Weisser as Farnsworth, The Interrogator
- Scott Paulin as Brick Bardo, The Driver

== Release ==
The film had its world premiere at the Alamo Drafthouse Cinema in Austin, Texas, in October 2008. The Chicago premiere of Road to Hell was at the Patio Theater on March 9, 2013. In November 2013, additional shooting was done with singer Joei Fulco from ABC's reality television show Wife Swap.

== Awards ==
2012 PollyGrind Film Festival:

- Best Fantasy Movie
- Best Actor: Michael Paré
- Best Actress: Clare Kramer
- Newcomer Award: Roxy Gunn
- Best Supporting Actress In A Fantasy Film: Deborah Van Valkenburgh
- Best Writer: Cynthia Curnan, Ph.D.
- Best Visual Effects: Daniel Ray Gutierrez
- Best Song: Streets of Fire
- Best Use Of Music: Albert Pyun

2012 Yellow Fever Independent Film Festival:

- Best Film
