= John Vallone =

Production designer

- Born: June 23, 1953; Pennsylvania, U.S.
- Died: March 15, 2004 (aged 50); Park City, Utah, U.S.
- Occupations: Production designer Art director
- Years active: 1977-2002

John Vallone (June 23, 1953 – March 15, 2004) was an American production designer and art director. He was nominated for an Academy Award in the category Best Art Direction for the film Star Trek: The Motion Picture.

== Selected filmography ==
- Star Trek: The Motion Picture (1979) (as art director)
- Southern Comfort (1981)
- 48 Hrs. (1982)
- Brainstorm (1983)
- Streets of Fire (1984)
- Commando (1985)
- Predator (1987)
- Red Heat (1988)
- Die Hard 2 (1990)
- Cliffhanger (1993)
- Bad Boys (1995)
