= Mean Guns =

- Directed by: Albert Pyun
- Written by: Andrew Witham
- Produced by: Tom Karnowski; Gary Schmoeller
- Starring: Ice-T; Christopher Lambert; Michael Halsey; Deborah Van Valkenburgh; Kimberly Warren; Hunter Doughty
- Cinematography: George Mooradian
- Edited by: Ken Morrisey
- Music by: Anthony Riparetti
- Release date: November 21, 1997 (U.S.)
- Running time: 104 minutes
- Country: United States
- Language: English

Mean Guns is a 1997 action film starring Ice-T, Christopher Lambert, Michael Halsey, Deborah Van Valkenburgh, Kimberly Warren and Hunter Doughty. It was directed by Albert Pyun.

The film was released on November 21, 1997.

== Plot ==
Vincent Moon is a member of a crime syndicate that has access to a newly built prison. The day before it is to open, he brings together 100 killers who have wronged the syndicate in various ways, provides them with weapons and ammunition, and gives them six hours to fight each other to the death. A $10 million cash prize is hidden in the prison, to be split by the last three survivors, but Moon's men will move in and kill everyone when time runs out.

A loose alliance forms between Cam, an accountant who was intercepted while trying to give photographic evidence of the syndicate's crimes to the authorities, and Marcus and D, two professional killers. They are soon interrupted by another killer, Lou, who briefly holds Marcus at gunpoint before being reluctantly accepted into the group. Lou is the informal guardian of a little girl named Lucy, whom he has left in his car outside the prison. Cam is badly shaken by the violence raging around her and cannot bring herself to kill anyone.

The four broadcast an announcement over the prison's public address system, claiming that they have found the money and daring everyone to fight them for it. Cam slips away as dozens are killed in the ensuing melee, and D abandons the group only to be strangled to death by Lou. After Moon announces the actual location of the money, Marcus finds two briefcases placed in that spot and takes them, leaving behind a third one rigged with a bomb. Marcus brings Lucy into the prison to help him take out the cash, while Barbie finds the bomb and is killed when it blows the top of her head off.

During these events, Lou reveals that he took Lucy into his care after her mother and stepfather were killed, and that he is participating in the game in order to provide for her future. Cam retrieves the pictures she was trying to turn over and shows them to Marcus, saying that she had not realized the extent of the syndicate's money laundering in which she was involved until she saw them. Marcus reveals that Moon brought him into the game in the hope that he would be the only survivor.

Moon summons the final three survivors - Cam, Lou, and Marcus - to a four-way showdown. He gives each of them a gun and keeps a fourth for himself, but deliberately fails to load the one given to Lou. Marcus shoots Cam and then Lou, whom Moon dismisses as a liability due to his violent nature. Marcus then kills Moon when Moon tries to quick-draw on him. The wounded Lou claims that Lucy is his biological daughter before he and Marcus kill each other.

Cam wakes up to find Lucy standing over her. Marcus had killed Lou at Lucy's request and only grazed Cam with his shot so she could fake her death. Cam drives off in Lou's car with Lucy and the prize money.

== Cast ==
- Christopher Lambert as Lou
- Ice-T as Vincent Moon
- Michael Halsey as Marcus
- Deborah Van Valkenburgh as Cam
- Tina Cote as Barbie (Tina Coté)
- Yuji Okumoto as Hoss
- Thom Mathews as "Crow"
- Kimberly Warren as "D"
- Hunter Doughty as Lucy "Little Lucy" (Hunter Lockwood Doughty)
- Jerry Rector as Bob
- James Wellington as Ricky
- Hoke Howell as Commissioner Guildner
- James Mathers as Jerry Montegna
- Milan Nicksic as Kobolski
- Jahi J.J. Zuri as "Blondie"
- Kimko as "Suit"
- Jim Koehler as "Slick"
- Robert Lennon as Oslo
- John Machado as " Fatboy"

== Reception ==
Entertainment Weekly gave the film a grade of D, saying that it did not live up to Albert Pyun's previous work. Sean Axmaker of Stream on Demand gave it a positive review calling it "an excuse for unending gunplay and giddy violence and Pyun rises to the occasion, executing everything from riotous free-for-alls to elaborate chases to western-style standoffs".
