= Jeffrey Jones =

American actor (born 1946)

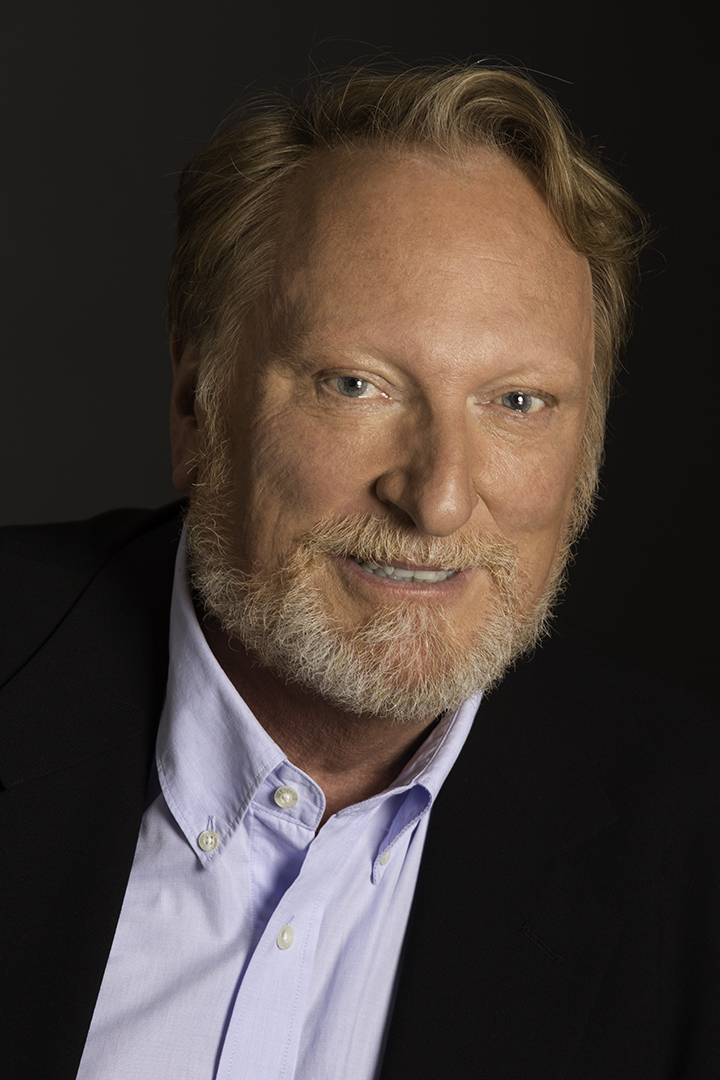
- Jones in 2012
- Born: Jeffrey Duncan Jones; September 28, 1946 (age 80); Buffalo, New York, U.S.
- Education: The Putney School; London Academy of Music and Dramatic Art; Lawrence University
- Occupation: Actor
- Years active: 1970–present
- Children: 1

Jeffrey Duncan Jones (born September 28, 1946) is an American actor. He is known for his roles as Emperor Joseph II in Amadeus (1984), Edward R. Rooney in Ferris Bueller's Day Off (1986), Charles Deetz in Beetlejuice (1988), Dr. Skip Tyler in The Hunt for Red October (1990), Eddie Barzoon in The Devil's Advocate (1997), and A. W. Merrick in both Deadwood (2004–2006) and Deadwood: The Movie (2019).

His career started in Guthrie Theater in Minneapolis, and advanced to London and Broadway. In film and television, Jones has had many roles which capitalized on his deadpan portrayal of characters in unusual situations, often to comic effect. He was nominated for a Golden Globe Award for his performance in Amadeus and a Screen Actors Guild Award as part of the ensemble cast of Deadwood.

In 2002, Jones was charged with soliciting a minor to pose for nude photographs. The offenses occurred in 1999 and 2000. In July 2003, he pleaded no contest and prosecutors dropped the charges for possession of child pornography. He was then sentenced to five years of probation and required to register as a sex offender for life. He had two subsequent arrests, in 2004 and 2010, for failing to update his sex offender status.

== Early life ==
Jones was born in Buffalo, New York, the son of Ruth (née Schooley) and Douglas Bennett Jones. His mother was an art historian, who urged him towards a career in acting. Jones's father died when Jones was an infant.

== Career ==
=== Early career ===
After graduating from The Putney School in 1964, Jones enrolled in Lawrence University as a premed student, where his performances in university productions brought him to the attention of Tyrone Guthrie, who recruited him for the Guthrie Theater in Minneapolis, Minnesota.

His stage career included more than 125 productions, starting with the Guthrie Theater, then internationally in South America, Canada, and London, and in New York Off-Broadway in Cloud 9 and Henry V, among other productions, as well as on Broadway in productions including Trelawny of the "Wells" and The Elephant Man. His transition from stage to film began in 1970.

=== Film and television career ===
Jones began acting in small parts in film and television in the 1970s. In his best-known roles as Emperor Joseph II in Amadeus, Charles Deetz in Beetlejuice, and Edward R. Rooney in Ferris Bueller's Day Off, his dead-pan expression and distinctive face bring a comic flavor to his characters through their reactions to the situations in which they find themselves, more so than the wit in their scripted lines. The New York Times' biographic profile reads: "Although he has tried to steer clear of playing only sinister roles, the actor's imposing height, bugged-out eyes, easy sneer, and shock of reddish-blond hair give him vaguely devilish features that have prompted villain typecasting. However, the actor is also widely respected and considered a boon wherever he appears." The profile describes his portrayals variously as a "hissable, cartoonish high school principal" in Ferris Bueller's Day Off, a "good-natured father" in Beetlejuice, "an interplanetary freedom fighter" in Mom and Dad Save the World, a "demon stand-in" in Stay Tuned, and "evil bespectacled twins" in Out on a Limb.

Jones's work in the Lucille Lortel Theatre production of Cloud 9 was noticed by the casting team of Easy Money (1983), earning Jones a supporting role opposite Rodney Dangerfield.

==== Amadeus ====
Cloud 9 further attracted the attention of director Miloš Forman, who cast Jones as Joseph II, Holy Roman Emperor in Amadeus (1984), an adaptation of the Peter Shaffer play of the same name. Critic James Berardinelli noted that Jones portrayed the Emperor "as a superficial and self-absorbed ruler who can't tell the difference between a great opera and a mediocre one". Vincent Canby of The New York Times praised Jones's performance, citing the film's most memorable line, when the Emperor complains of Die Entführung aus dem Serail that "there are too many notes". Jones's work earned him a nomination for the Golden Globe Award for Best Supporting Actor – Motion Picture.

==== Ferris Bueller's Day Off ====
Jones's performance as Edward R. Rooney in the film Ferris Bueller's Day Off (1986) made him a cultural icon. Rooney, self-important and obsessed with catching the chronic truant Ferris Bueller, became a symbol of pomposity and authoritarian hatefulness. The New York Times' review characterized Jones's performance as having "fine cartoon like ferocity", wherein his character "gets scratched, bitten, attacked by ferocious dogs and covered with mud while pursuing his weaker, but craftier prey, and emerges each time bruised but undaunted, thinking up some new (and futile) plan". The review likened Jones's role as akin to that of Wile E. Coyote as a character who is fated to be unable to catch The Road Runner (Ferris Bueller). Jones expressed concern about being remembered more for this role than for Amadeus. Regarding its premise, he said: "What's amazing about Ferris Bueller, is that we're asked to, and do, sympathize with a kid whose only complaint in life is that his sister got a car for her birthday and he got a computer."

==== Beetlejuice and Tim Burton ====
In the horror comedy film Beetlejuice (1988), Jones and Catherine O'Hara portrayed a married couple (Charles and Delia Deetz) who unwittingly become co-owners of a haunted house. To highlight this couple's status as boors, director Tim Burton cast Dick Cavett and Robert Goulet to appear as their guests at a dinner party, at which the ghosts of the previous owners cause everyone to sing "Day-O (The Banana Boat Song)".

Jones collaborated with Burton again on the films Ed Wood (1994), in which he portrays The Amazing Criswell, and Sleepy Hollow (1999). Shortly prior to the release of Sleepy Hollow, Jones said of Burton, "I've known Tim now for quite some time and really enjoy working with him. I like his sensibility, and he's great fun."

==== Other films ====
Jones played Dr. Walter Jenning in the George Lucas film Howard the Duck (1986). He portrayed Inspector Lestrade in the Sherlock Holmes spoof film Without a Clue (1988). In The Hunt for Red October (1990), he played ex-submarine commander Skip Tyler, who identifies the Red October's propulsion system to Alec Baldwin's Jack Ryan. He also appeared as real-life figure Thomas Putnam in The Crucible (1996). He also played Uncle Crenshaw Little in Stuart Little (1999). As lumber mogul Joe Potter, Jones was the primary antagonist of the Eddie Murphy comedy Dr. Dolittle 2 (2001).

==== Television roles ====
One of Jones's earliest television roles was in an episode of the short-lived CBS series Sara (1976). He showcased his villain persona as Mister Acme, the owner of Acme Toxic Waste, in the satirical comedy miniseries Fresno (1986), starring Carol Burnett, Charles Grodin, and Dabney Coleman. For Disney, Jones hosted the 1987 D-TV Monster Hits musical special (as the Magic Mirror) and later co-starred with Tyra Banks, Kathy Najimy and Kevin Pollak in the video storyline portion of the Walt Disney World attraction Extraterrorestrial Alien Encounter, a staple of Tomorrowland from 1995 to 2003. He has had guest roles on a number of television series, including Amazing Stories, Tales from the Crypt, and Batman: The Animated Series. He was the star of another short-lived CBS program: the sitcom The People Next Door (1989), portraying a cartoonist whose imagination could make things come to life.

Jones's most prominent television role is that of newspaper publisher A. W. Merrick on the acclaimed HBO drama series Deadwood (2004–2006). Keith Uhlich of Slant Magazine referred to both Jones and the character of Merrick as "perversely appropriate additions" to the program, further citing Merrick as its "secular soul". Along with the ensemble cast, Jones was nominated for the Screen Actors Guild Award for Outstanding Performance by an Ensemble in a Drama Series.

=== Later career ===
Following his appearance in the golf comedy Who's Your Caddy? (2007), he was absent from film and television for several years. He returned with an uncredited cameo as Collier's editor Charles Colebaugh in the HBO original film Hemingway & Gellhorn (2012), followed by the supporting role of scientist Gladstone in the independent disaster film 10.0 Earthquake (2014). Jones went on to play a fictional version of himself in the short film 7 Days (2016) and reprised the role of A. W. Merrick in Deadwood: The Movie (2019).

In May 2015, Jones returned to the stage with the New American Theatre production of 63 Trillion, directed by Steve Zuckerman. The Los Angeles Times said his portrayal of financial adviser Dick had "malevolent gusto that Satan himself might envy". Beginning in March 2018, Jones portrayed ailing patriarch Bradley in a production of the A. R. Gurney play The Cocktail Hour, staged at the Annenberg Theater in the Palm Springs Art Museum.

Jones was not brought back to reprise his role as Charles Deetz in Beetlejuice Beetlejuice (2024) due to his legal issues. His character is explained to have been killed by being eaten by a shark after his plane crashed in the ocean, and his likeness is used through means of stop-motion in flashback sequences, as well as archival photos and footage throughout the film thereafter. In scenes set in the afterlife, Deetz is portrayed by a body double (with half of his body missing) and a voice impersonator, in a rare instance of a fake Shemp being used on a living actor.

In June 2025, Jones participated in a Ferris Bueller's Day Off reunion panel at The Hollywood Show convention, his first public appearance in years.

== Personal life ==
Jones has one son, actor Julian Coutts, whose mother was Lloy Coutts, a Canadian voice coach. She and Jones met in Stratford, Ontario.

One interviewer in 1989 found Jones to value anonymity and the enjoyment of everyday tasks, like home repairs, and found him to be uninterested in status symbols and fan adulation. Jones pointed out that greater public recognition makes it more difficult to transition between roles and allow the character to come to the fore and the actor to recede from view.

As of 2025, Jones resides in Los Angeles, California after living in a desert community in the state for years.

=== Legal issues ===
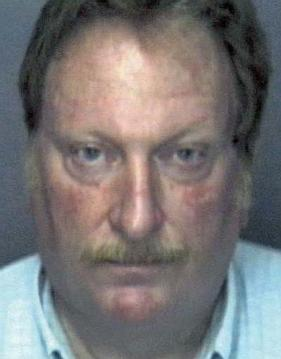
Jones's photo from the Florida Department of Law Enforcement's sex offender registry

==== Child sexual abuse materials ====
Jones was arrested in November 2002 for possession of child sexual abuse material and soliciting a 14-year-old boy to produce sexually explicit images between September 2000 and May 2001. Jones photographed the child, and paid him to pose nude on multiple occasions wearing a cowboy hat, with stuffed animals, and dressed as a Native American. Jones surrendered himself and was released on bond prior to arraignment. Jones initially pleaded not guilty to the possession charge and no contest to a charge of soliciting a minor. The victim initiated a separate civil action against Jones seeking damages and compensation. The misdemeanor charge of possession of child pornography was dropped following the no-contest plea. His attorney emphasized that there was no allegation of improper physical contact. His punishment was five years' probation and the requirement to register as a sex offender for life. Jones is listed in sex offender registries in California and Florida. He was also required to undergo one year of psychological counseling and two years of drug and alcohol abuse counseling and was prohibited from possessing pornography.

==== Other offenses ====
Jones was arrested twice for failing to update his sex offender status, first in Florida in 2004, and then in California in 2010. Jones pleaded guilty to the felony charges in California, receiving a sentence of 250 hours of community service and three years of probation.

In 2006, Jones's record became the subject of a community complaint during production of Who's Your Caddy? in Aiken, South Carolina. Upon learning of his involvement, locals insisted that the public should have been alerted, considering that families were being invited to visit the set.

In September 2023, Jones received complaints after booking an appearance at the Rhode Island Comic Con, with the organization releasing a statement that he had been vetted and removed from the lineup months earlier.

== Filmography ==
=== Film ===
Year	Title	Role	Notes
1970	The Revolutionary	Red-Haired Radical Committee Member	Credited as Jeff Jones
1978	A Wedding	Guest	Uncredited
1982	The Soldier	U.S. Assistant Secretary of Defense	
1983	Easy Money	Clive Barlow	
1984	Amadeus	Emperor Joseph II	
1985	Transylvania 6-5000	Mayor Lepescu	
1986	Ferris Bueller's Day Off	Dean Ed Rooney	
1986	Howard the Duck	Dr. Walter Jenning / The Dark Overlord of the Universe	
1987	The Hanoi Hilton	Major Fischer	
1987	Kenny Rogers as The Gambler, Part III: The Legend Continues	Buffalo Bill	
1988	Beetlejuice	Charles Deetz	
1988	Without a Clue	Inspector George Lestrade	
1989	Who's Harry Crumb?	Elliot Draison	
1989	Valmont	Gercourt	
1990	The Hunt for Red October	Dr. Skip Tyler	
1992	Out on a Limb	Matt Skearns / Peter Van Der Haven	
1992	Mom and Dad Save the World	Dick Nelson	
1992	Stay Tuned	Spike	
1993	Heaven & Earth	Minister	Uncredited
1994	Ed Wood	The Amazing Criswell	
1995	Houseguest	Ron Timmerman	
1996	The Crucible	Thomas Putnam	
1997	The Devil's Advocate	Eddie Barzoon	
1997	The Pest	Gustav Shank	
1997	Santa Fe	Dr. Raskin	Uncredited
1997	Flypaper	Roger	
1999	Stuart Little	Crenshaw Little	
1999	Ravenous	Colonel Hart	
1999	Sleepy Hollow	Reverend Steenwyck	
2000	Company Man	Senator Biggs	
2001	Heartbreakers	Mr. Appel	
2001	Dr. Dolittle 2	Joe Potter	
2001	How High	Vice President	
2002	Par 6	Lloyd Bator Jenkins	
2007	Who's Your Caddy?	Cummings	
2014	10.0 Earthquake	Marcus Gladstone	
2016	7 Days	Himself	Short

=== Television ===
Year	Title	Role	Notes
1977	Great Performances	Sergeant Wilson	Episode: "Secret Service"
1977	Kojak	Attendant	Episode: "Lady in the Squadroom"
1983	A Fine Romance	Harr	Television film
1983	Remington Steele	Clifford Conant	Episode: "A Steele at Any Price"
1985	The Twilight Zone	Carl Wilkerson	Episode: "Opening Day"
1986	If Tomorrow Comes	Budge Hollander	Miniseries; 1 episode
1986	George Washington II: The Forging of a Nation	Thomas Jefferson	Television film
1986	Fresno	Mr. Acme	Miniseries; 2 episodes
1986	Amazing Stories	John Baldwin	Episode: "The Eternal Mind"
1987	Disney's DTV Monster Hits	Magic Mirror	TV special
1989	The People Next Door	Walter Kellogg	10 episodes
1993	Tales from the Crypt	Professor Finley	Episode: "Creep Course"
1994	Duckman	Warden (voice)	Episode: "I, Duckman"
1994	Eek! The Cat	Seymour the Sloth (voice)	Episode: "Honey, I Shrunk the Cat"
1995	Batman: The Animated Series	Nivens (voice)	Episode: "A Bullet for Bullock"
1995	Aaahh!!! Real Monsters	Man In White (voice)	Episode: "Monsters Are Real"
1995	The Avenging Angel	Brother Milton Long	Television film
1998	The Outer Limits	Dr. Scott Perkins	Episode: "The Joining"
2001	Till Dad Do Us Part	Brady	Television film
2001–2006	Invader Zim	Various voices	4 episodes
2002	The Zeta Project	Detective Marcus (voice)	Episode: "The Wrong Morph"
2002	Justice League	Sir Swami (voice)	Episode: "Legends"
2003	Stuart Little	Crenshaw Little (voice)	2 episodes
2004–2006	Deadwood	A. W. Merrick	33 episodes
2012	Hemingway & Gellhorn	Charles Colebaugh	Television film; uncredited
2019	Deadwood: The Movie	A. W. Merrick	Television film

=== Other works ===
Year	Title	Role	Notes
1995	Bombmeister	The Bombmeister	Interactive film (unreleased)
1995	Extraterrorestrial Alien Encounter	L.C. Clench	Theme park attraction
1998	Fallout 2	Dick Richardson	Video game
