= Black Hills Pioneer =

Newspaper published in Spearfish, South Dakota

- Type: Daily newspaper
- Format: Tabloid
- Owner(s): Seaton Publishing Company, Inc.
- Founder(s): A. W. Merrick; W. A. Laughlin
- Publisher: Letitia Lister
- Editor: Mark Watson
- Founded: June 8, 1876
- Language: English
- Headquarters: 315 Seaton Circle; Spearfish, South Dakota 57783; USA
- Circulation: 5,000
- Sister newspapers: Nation's Center News; The Weekly Prospector
- ISSN: 1061-6179
- OCLC number: 21928320
- Website: bhpioneer.com

The Black Hills Pioneer is a daily newspaper published in Spearfish, South Dakota. It is a newspaper of record for the city of Sturgis, and Meade County.

== History ==
On June 8, 1876, A. W. Merrick and W. A. Laughlin first published the Black Hills Weekly Pioneer in Deadwood, South Dakota. After a month Laughlin sold out to C.V. Gardner. In April 1877, Porter Warner and W.P. Newhard started the Black Hills Daily Times. Newhard exited the firm after a month.

In December 1884, Merrick left the Pioneer to Dolph Edwards and H.W. Pinneo, who published it together until April 1885, when Willis H. Bonham succeeded Pinneo. That May, Edwards retired and was succeeded by Charles Maskrey and James C. Moody.

In 1897, the Pioneer and Times merged to form the Deadwood Pioneer Times, leaving Warner as editor and Bonham as business manager. Bonham published the paper until his death in 1927. His nephews Lee V. and Earl Morford continued to operated the business. In February 1944, O.A. Kelley bought the Pioneer Times from Lee V. Morford, and later that year purchased the Black Hills Weekly of Deadwood from Mrs. Elizabeth Howe Donaldson.

Fred A. Seaton, founder of Seaton Publishing, acquired the Lead Daily Call in October 1945. Later that year brothers Carl H. and Roy A. "Spud" Sundstrom acquired the Pioneer Times and Weekly, and in 1946 sold them to Seaton, who died in 1974. In 1983, Seaton Publishing, Co. launched the Spearfish Star as a competitor to the Spearfish Queen City Mail, which it acquired in 1985. At that time the Star was merged with the Weekly to form the Black Hills Weekly & Spearfish Star. The Weekly was consolidated at some point. In 1993, the Call, the Mail and Pioneer Times were merged under the name Black Hills Pioneer.

== Pop culture ==
Publisher A.W. Merrick and the Black Hills Weekly Pioneer are portrayed in the HBO television series Deadwood.
