= The Funhouse Massacre =

- Directed by: Andy Palmer
- Screenplay by: Ben Begley
- Story by: Ben Begley; Renee Dorian
- Produced by: Warner Davis
- Starring: Robert Englund; Jere Burns; Scottie Thompson; Matt Angel; Clint Howard; Chasty Ballesteros; Courtney Gains; Candice De Visser
- Cinematography: Filip Vandewal
- Music by: Chad Rehmann
- Production company: Petri Entertainment
- Distributed by: Shout! Factory
- Release date: November 13, 2015
- Running time: 90 minutes
- Country: United States
- Language: English

The Funhouse Massacre is a 2015 American horror slasher comedy film starring Robert Englund, Jere Burns, Scottie Thompson and Clint Howard.

== Plot ==
Halloween Night – Journalist Miss Quinn comes to the Statesville Mental Hospital to interview Warden Kane. The warden introduces Ms. Quinn to five of the asylum’s most notorious serial killer inmates. Jeffrey Ramses was a chef who became known as "Animal the Cannibal" for serving victims to his customers. Murderous dentist Bradford Young is known as "Dr. Suave". Walter Harris is “The Taxidermist". "Rocco the Clown" was an underground wrestler who killed his opponents in the ring. Manual Dyer was a cult leader who considered himself a prophet, but is referred to as "Mental Manny" because of his psychosis. Miss Quinn reveals herself to actually be "The Stitch Face Killer" when she murders Warden Kane and the guards before freeing the inmates. Manny refers to Quinn as "Dollface" because she is also his daughter Eileen. Sheriff Kate Dyer and bumbling Deputy Doyle investigate a murder at a motel.

Having been tricked into doing so while romantically involved with Dollface, proprietor Dennis themes his Land of Illusions Haunted Scream Park at the Macon County Funhouse around the crimes of the Statesville Mental Hospital inmates. Manny has Rocco attack Dennis and drag him away as the killers murder the actors playing them and take over their roles inside the maze.

Along with their friends Mikey and Randall, diner coworkers Morgan, Laurie, Christina, and Jason leave work to go the Halloween haunt. Coworker Gerardo drives everyone there, but leaves after deciding that the attraction looks too frightening. All night long, the killers murder unsuspecting patrons. Other customers assume the gore is part of the entertainment. After taking a prank phone call, Deputy Doyle assumes all incoming calls concerning attacks at the funhouse are fake.

Kate returns to the crime scene at the motel and discovers that the room belonged to Dollface. Clues lead Kate to conclude that whatever Dollface was planning involved the Statesville Mental Hospital inmates. Kate regroups with Deputy Doyle and the two of them discover the bloodbath at the asylum. Dollface kills Christina in the bathroom after Christina has sex with Jason. The other friends realize what is actually happening at the funhouse after they find Christina’s dead body. The friends find themselves cornered when they discover the front gate to the park is chained shut. Rocco murders Mikey, Randall, and Jason. Laurie remains trapped inside the park while Morgan escapes and goes for help.

As he and the sheriff arrive at the funhouse, Deputy Doyle accidentally shoots Morgan’s arm when Morgan flags them down. Morgan explains what is happening inside the park. Gerardo joins their group and together, the four of them return to Land of Illusions to rescue the others and take down the killers. Laurie kills Dr. Suave. Manny kills WKDE deejays Bob and Dave in front of the crowd during their live Halloween broadcast from the attraction. Manny then announces to the audience that all of the murders they have witnessed were real. The remaining killers continue attacking panicking patrons.

Deputy Doyle, Morgan, and Gerardo regroup with Laurie and go on the offensive while Kate goes after Manny. Doyle shoots The Taxidermist. Morgan and Gerardo kill Animal. Doyle faces off against Rocco and shoots him to the ground. Kate is revealed to be an escaped cult member who is also Manny’s daughter. Kate shoots and kills Manny. Dollface attacks Kate. Laurie becomes involved in the fight and watches as Kate and Dollface stab each other to death. Doyle, Morgan, Gerardo, and Laurie escape in the light of day as more police arrive at the park. Rocco suddenly reappears and kills Morgan. The cops riddle Rocco with bullets. Doyle retrieves a shotgun and fires into Rocco at point blank range.

Gerardo leaves as Laurie recovers in an ambulance. EMTs announce that they have another survivor and wheel Kate into the ambulance. As the vehicle takes to the road, Laurie realizes Kate is actually Dollface wearing the sheriff’s skin. Dollface later escapes the ambulance after leaving it disabled along the side of the road. Back at the funhouse, Rocco reanimates while inside a body bag.

== Cast ==
- Robert Englund - Warden Kane
- Jere Burns - Mental Manny Dyer
- Scottie Thompson - Sheriff Kate Dyer
- Matt Angel - Morgan
- Chasty Ballesteros - Christina
- Clint Howard - Taxidermist
- Courtney Gains - Dennis
- Erick Chavarria - Gerardo
- Mars Crain - Rocco
- Candice De Visser - Dollface / Ms. Eileen Dyer
- E.E. Bell - Animal
- Ben Begley - Deputy Doyle
- Michael Eric Reid - Mikey
- Leigh Parker - Randall
- Sebastian Siegel - Dr. Suave
- Renee Dorian - Laurie
- Sterling Sulieman - Jason

== Production ==
The film was largely made at the real Land of Illusion Haunted Scream Park outside of Middletown, Ohio.

== Reception ==
The film has a positive reception on Rotten Tomatoes with a 73% positive rating based on 15 critic reviews.

Noel Nurray writing for the Los Angeles Times said the film "sports inventive gore effects and character design" but "nothing all that shocking or scary happens, as the minimal story quickly devolves into one methodical murder after another — their effect blunted by the jokey tone." Dennis Harvey reviewed the film for Variety saying "Not the cleverest or most original horror comedy, Andy Palmer’s indie feature is nonetheless above average within that subgenre, offering fast-paced fun for fans." Dread Central's Matt Boiselle found the film pleasantly surprising claiming "If you’re looking for a fun time with a VERY large body count, you’d be making a mistake passing this one up."
