= Courtney Peldon =

American television and film actress

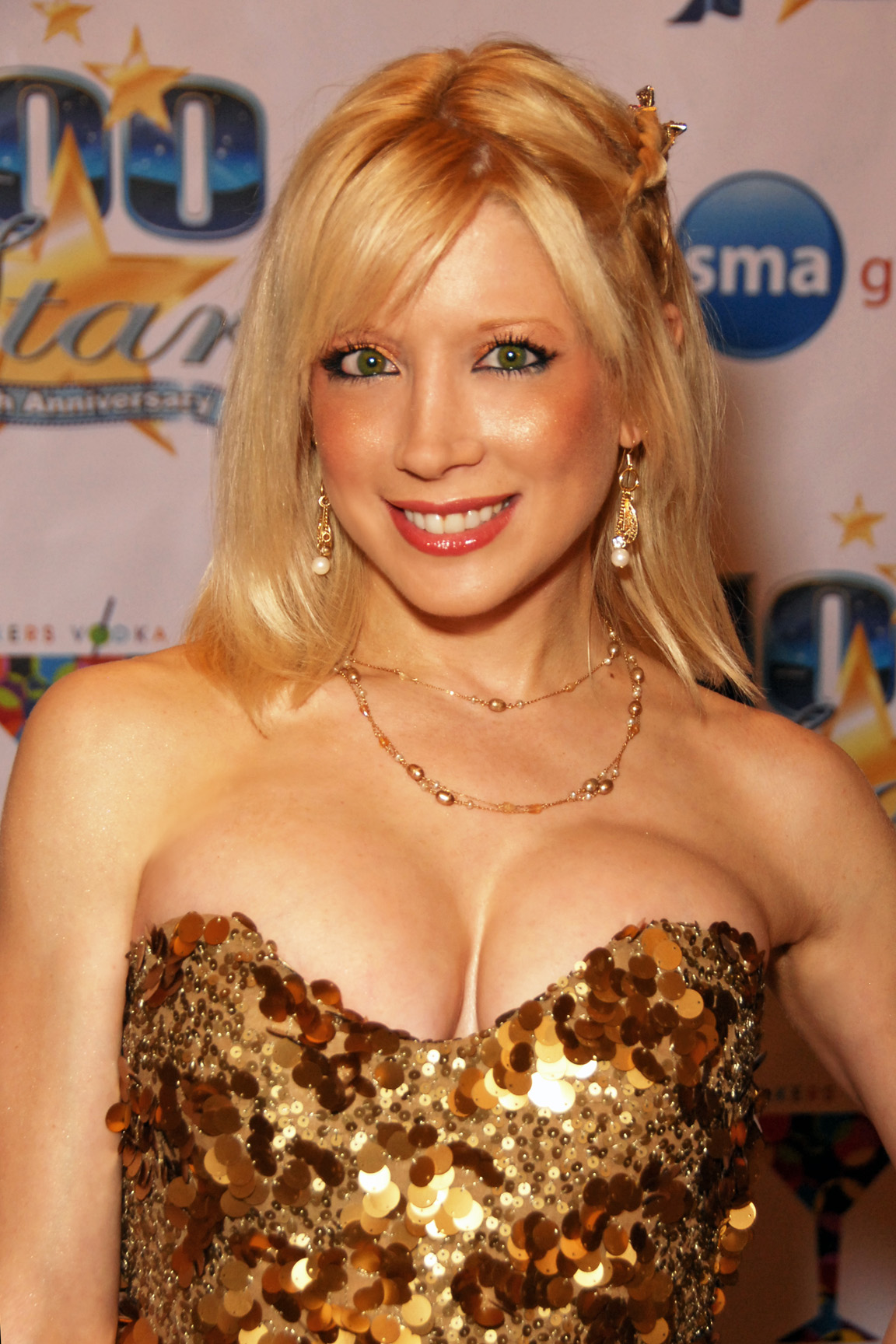
- Courtney Peldon attending the "Night of 100 Stars" for the 82nd Academy Awards viewing party at the Beverly Hills Hotel, Beverly Hills, CA on March 7, 2010
- Born: April 18, 1981 (age 45)
- Occupation: Actress
- Years active: 1986–present

Courtney Peldon (born April 13, 1981 or April 18, 1981) is an American television and film actress.

== Career ==
Peldon starred on Broadway at age 8 in Meet Me in St. Louis (1989) for the show's entire run in the role of Tootie.

Peldon is best known for her three seasons as Jonathan Taylor Thomas's on-screen girlfriend Lauren on Home Improvement, and for her three seasons on Boston Public. She has appeared in many roles on various television shows such as That '70s Show, Entourage, The Pretender, Star Trek: Deep Space Nine, Renegade and Nash Bridges.

She has played roles in several films including Out on a Limb, Little Giants, indie film Skin Walker, National Lampoon's Adam & Eve, Tobe Hooper's Mortuary, and the Farrelly brothers' comedy Say It Isn't So. More recent films include the science fiction thriller InAlienable, and the action-fantasy film Road to Hell.

== Awards and nominations ==
For nine consecutive years, Peldon won, or at least was nominated for a Young Artist Award.

- 1993 - Nominated for Best Young Actress in an Off-Primetime Series for Harry and the Hendersons and won for Best Young Actress Co-starring in a Motion Picture for Out on a Limb.
- 1994 - Won for Best Youth Actress Guest Starring in a Television Show for Lois & Clark: The New Adventures of Superman.
- 1995 - Nominated for Best Performance: Young Actress in a TV Comedy Series for The Mommies.
- 1996 - Nominated for Best Performance by a Young Actress in TV Drama Series for Renegade.
- 1997 - Won for Best Performance in a TV Comedy by a Guest Starring Young Performer for Home Improvement; tied with Seth Adkins for Sabrina, the Teenage Witch.
- 1998 - Nominated for Best Performance in a TV Movie/Pilot/Mini-Series by a Supporting Young Actress for Little Girls in Pretty Boxes (TV movie).
- 1999 - Nominated for Best Performance in a TV Comedy Series by a Guest Starring Young Actress for Home Improvement.
- 2000 - Nominated for Best Performance in a TV Comedy Series by a Supporting Young Actress for Home Improvement.
- 2001 - Nominated for Best Performance in a TV Movie (Drama) by a Supporting Young Actress for The Princess & the Barrio Boy (TV movie).

== Filmography ==
Year	Title	Role	Notes
1986	The Ellen Burstyn Show	Lily	Episode: "Family Affair"
1989	Adventures in Babysitting	Sara Anderson	TV pilot
1992	Out on a Limb	Marci Campbell	
1991-1993	Harry and the Hendersons	Darcy Payne	26 episodes
1993	Civil Wars		Episode: "Captain Kangaroo Court"
1993	Empty Nest	Libby	Episode: "Bye-Bye Baby... Hello: Part 2"
1993	Lois & Clark: The New Adventures of Superman	Amy Valdez	Episode: "Smart Kids"
1994	Little Giants	Debbie O'Shea	
1994-1995	The Mommies	Beth Booker	4 episodes
1995	Renegade	Lisa St. John	Episode: "Hit Man"; Episode: "An Uncle in the Business"
1995	The Client	Julia	Episode: "The Way Things Never Were"
1995	Tom and Huck	Townspeople	
1996	Spider-Man	Additional Voices	Episode: "Sins of the Fathers Chapter 2"; Episode: "Sins of the Fathers Chapter 3"
1996	ABC Afterschool Special	Megan	Episode: "Me and My Hormones"
1996-1998	Home Improvement	Lauren	7 episodes
1997	Little Girls in Pretty Boxes	Katie Bryant	TV movie
1997	The Ice Storm	Billie (uncredited)	
1997	The Visitor	Donna	Episode: "Teufelsnacht"
1998	Star Trek: Deep Space Nine	Farris	Episode: "Valiant"
1998	The Pretender	Kaley Isaac	Episode: "Bank"
1999	3rd Rock from the Sun	Janine	Episode: "Dick Solomon of the Indiana Solomons"
1999	A Murder on Shadow Mountain	Young Sherry Gaines	TV movie
1999	The Promise	Susie Miles	TV movie
1999	Miss Supreme Queen	Brittani Golden	Short film
1999	The Steve Harvey Show	Cindy	Episode: "My Two Big Daddies"
2000	Nash Bridges	Zoe Karros	Episode: "Line of Sight"
2000	Wild Grizzly	Terri Bradford	TV movie
2000	The Princess & the Barrio Boy	Gilda	TV movie
2001	Say It Isn't So	Cher Falwell	
2001	Special Unit 2	Megan Benson	Episode: "The Depths"
2001	That '70s Show	Katie	Episode: "Hyde Gets the Girl"
2001	Undressed	Angie	TV series
2002	Raising Dad	Alison	3 episodes
2002	Reality Check	Charlolette	
2003	Lost at Home	Lori	Episode: "Pilot"
2003-2004	Boston Public	Becky Emerson	14 episodes
2004	Entourage	Jane	Episode: "Pilot"
2004	Skin Walker	Candy	
2005	Mortuary	Tina	
2005	National Lampoon's Adam & Eve	Patty	
2005-2006	W.I.T.C.H.	Courtney Grumper (voice)	3 episodes
2006	The Emperor's New School	Cuxi, Cuca & Curi (voice)	5 episodes
2008	InAlienable	Dr. Amanda Mayfield	
2008	Road to Hell	Ashley	
2010	L.A. Detectives	Ann Favor	Short film
2011	Jesus Sex Scandal	Miriam Ben Hur	Video short
2011	Freeloaders	Amber	
2013	Frozen	Additional Voices	
2015	Star Trek: Renegades	Shree	
2018	Spider-Man: Into the Spider-Verse	Additional Voices	
