= Chasty Ballesteros =

Canadian actress

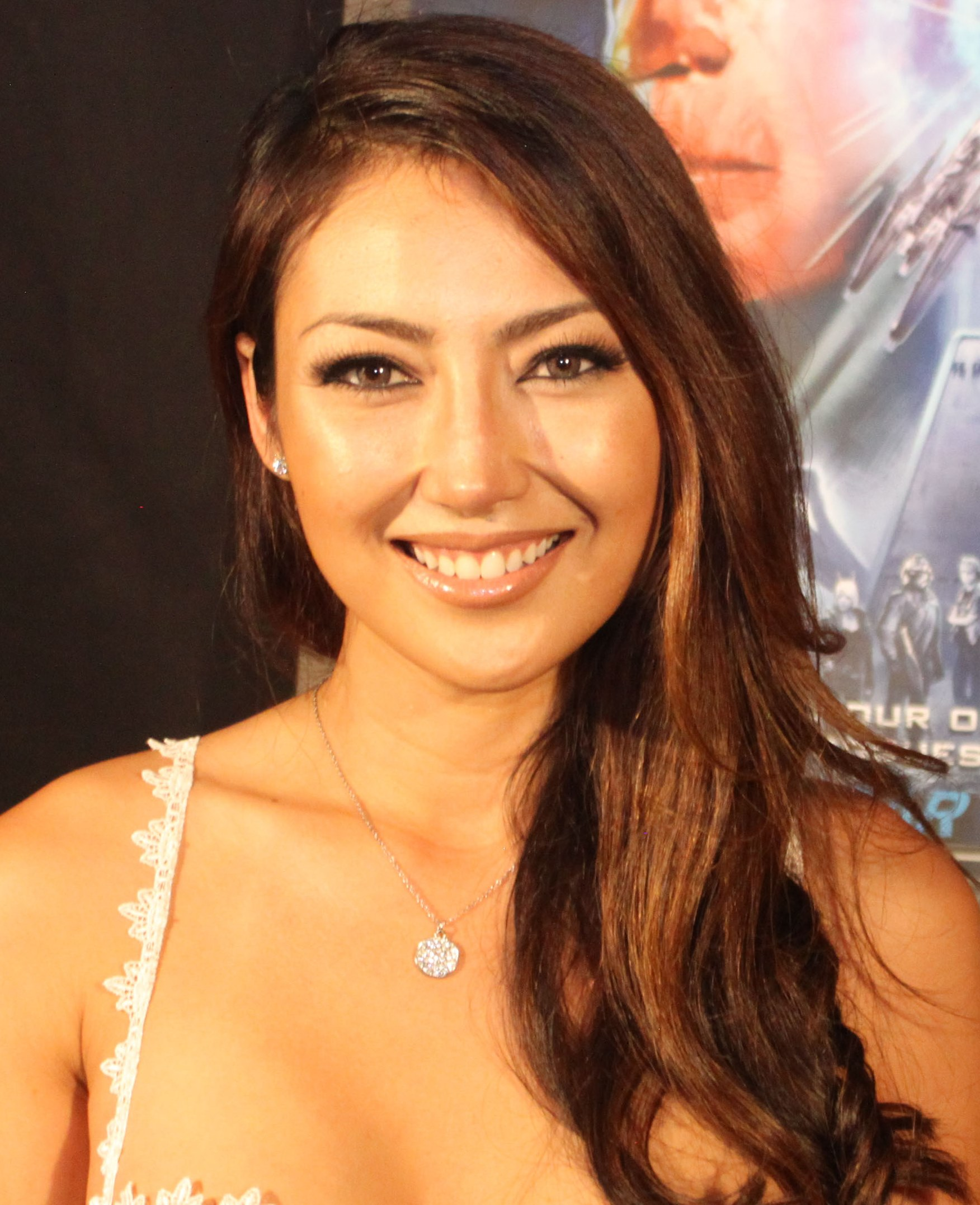
- Ballesteros in 2015
- Born: Chasty Rose Ballesteros; January 3, 1981 (age 45); Winnipeg, Manitoba, Canada
- Occupation: Actress
- Years active: 2009–present

Chasty Rose Ballesteros (born January 3, 1981) is a Canadian actress. She has made appearances in series including Smallville, Supernatural, Psych, Sanctuary, Modern Family, The Big Bang Theory, and How I Met Your Mother.

== Filmography ==
=== Film ===
Year	Title	Role	Notes
2009	Encounter with Danger	Britt	Television film
2010	Guido Superstar: The Rise of Guido	Chastity Divine	
2011	Final Destination 5	Spa receptionist	
2012	Three of a Kind	Keri	Short film
2012	The Movie Out Here	Glacier girl #1	
2013	Not Another Celebrity Movie	Asian woman	
2013	Casting Couch	Kimmy	
2013	Bounty Killer	Korah	
2013	The Internship	Exotic dancer #1	
2013	Cavemen	Monique	
2014	Chicks Dig Gay Guys	Gothic girl	
2014	Neighbors	Alecia	Uncredited
2014	American Dream: The True Story	Abigail	Short film
2014	Think Like a Man Too	Leikula	
2014	10.0 Earthquake	Cindy	
2014	Girl House	Janet	
2015	The Funhouse Massacre	Christina	
2015	The Night Crew	Mae	
2015	Hot Bot	Sophia	
2015	For All Eyes Always	Fei Song	
2015	Star Trek Renegades	Ronara	YouTube, Theater & Video
2016	Vigilante Diaries	Raven	
2016	The Morning the Sun Fell Down	Yuan	Working title Morning Sun
2017	The Mummy	Kira Lee (uncredited)	
2017	Espionage Tonight	Fei Song	
2018	The Grounds	Krystal	
2019	Staged Killer	Lana	
2020	The Party Planner	Shonda	
2022	The Secret Life of College Escorts	Isabella	
2023	Malibu Horror Story	Michelle	

=== Television ===
Year	Title	Role	Notes
2009	Smallville	Nurse	Episode: "Turbulence"
2009	The Guard	Collette	Episode: "Body Parts"
2009	Supernatural	Nurse #2	Episode: "Changing Channels"
2010	Psych	Melissa	Episode: "Death Is in the Air"
2010	Sanctuary	Bridget	Episode: "Bank Job"
2012	How I Met Your Mother	Tina	Episode: "Tailgate"
2012	Criminal Minds	Tahitian girl	Episode: "Snake Eyes"
2012	Happy Endings	Hot girl	Uncredited; episode: "Everybody Loves Grant"
2012	Rules of Engagement	Grace	Episode: "Missed Connections"
2012	Hollywood Heights	Hostess	2 episodes
2012–2013	The Newsroom	Tea	7 episodes
2012	The Soul Man	Gorgeous woman	Episode: "Preacher's Block"
2012	The Mindy Project	Waitress	Episode: "In the Club"
2012	Two and a Half Men	Woman	Episode: "Four Balls, Two Bats and One Mitt"
2012	The Neighbors	Stripper	Episode: "Merry Crap-Mas"
2013	Shameless	Waitress	Episode: "The American Dream"
2013	CSI: NY	Rowena Black	Episode: "White Gold"
2013	Californication	Waitress	Episode: "Hell Bent for Leather"
2013	The Client List	Tina	Episode: "When I Say I Do"
2013	Franklin & Bash	Hot young woman	Episode: "Coffee and Cream"
2013	Ray Donovan	Sunny	Episode: "Housewarming"
2013	Baby Daddy	Debbie	Episode: "Whatever Lola Wants"
2013	Wendell & Vinnie	Gretchen	Episode: "Vinnie & the Toad"
2013	The Exes	Samantha	Episode: "My Ex-Boyfriend's Wedding"
2013	Sons of Anarchy	Cute hooker	2 episodes
2013	See Dad Run	Nikki	Episode: "See Dad McLivin' with the McGinleys"
2013	The League	Stripper #1	Episode: "Rafi and Dirty Randy"
2013	Ironside	Sophie	Episode: "Pentimento"
2013	The Girl's Guide to Depravity	Rachel Ward	12 episodes
2013	The Crazy Ones	Carly the model	Episode: "The Spectacular"
2013	Parenthood	Bob's assistant	Episode: "The Ring"
2014	Rake	Pretty girl	Episode: "Serial Killer"
2014	Bosch	Marissa	Episode: "The Magic Castle"
2014	Enlisted	Theresa	Episode: "Brothers and Sister"
2014	Legit	Jack's masseuse	Episode: "Rub & Slide"
2014	Anger Management	Stripper	Episode: "Charlie Catches Jordan in the Act"
2014	You're the Worst	Female interviewer	Episode: "Constant Horror and Bone-Deep Dissatisfaction"
2014	Days of Our Lives	Dana	Episode dated September 12, 2014
2014	New Girl	Barb	Episode: "Dice"
2014	Revenge	Kaya	Episode: "Renaissance"
2014	Bad Judge	Cute lady	Episode: "Knife to a Gunfight"
2014	Benched	Whispers	Episode: "Downsizing"
2014	Constantine	Misaki Ross	Episode: "Danse Vaudou"
2014	Stalker	Sophia Mason	Episode: "A Cry for Help"
2015	Modern Family	Lucy	Episode: "Rash Decisions"
2015	American Horror Story: Hotel	Young Woman	Episode: "Checking In"
2016-2020	The Ranch	Tanya Showers the Weather Girl	7 episodes
2016	Rosewood	Carina Radnor	Episode: "Lidocaine and Long-Term Lust"
2017	Veep	Casey	Episode: "Justice"
2017	Me, Myself & I	Teacher	Episode: "New Job"
2018	Lucifer	Isabel Deluca	Episode: "High School Poppycock"
2018	S.W.A.T.	Deirdre	Episode: "Armory"
2018	Into the Dark	Bubblegum Girl	Episode: "The Body"
2019	The Big Bang Theory	Karen	2 episodes
2020	FraXtur	Jen	8 episodes
2021	B Positive	Amber	1 episode
2021	Genera+ion	Delilah's Mother	1 episode
2025	The Cleaning Lady	Bianca Gallo	2 episodes

Web
Year	Title	Role	Notes
2011	Divine: The Series	Jin	3 episodes
2012	The Unknown	Tnen-ku	Episode: "Spare the Child"
2015	Star Trek: Renegades	Ronara	Pilot
