= Star Trek: Renegades =

2015 fan film directed by Tim Russ

- Promotional poster
- Genre: Science fiction drama
- Based on: Star Trek by Gene Roddenberry
- Written by: Ethan H. Calk; Sky Conway; Jack Treviño
- Directed by: Tim Russ
- Starring: Walter Koenig; Tim Russ; Adrienne Wilkinson; Sean Young; Robert Picardo; Gary Graham; Richard Herd; Chasty Ballesteros; Manu Intiraymi; Edward Furlong
- Composer: Justin R. Durban
- Country of origin: United States
- Original language: English

Production
- Executive producers: Deborah Moss; Stacey Woolf Feinberg; Joshua B. Cole; Mac McRoberts
- Producer: Sky Conway (producer)
- Production location: Laurel Canyon Studios
- Cinematography: Tristan Barnard
- Editors: Michael Linn; Marc Linn; Jon Macht (vfx editor)
- Running time: 90 minutes

Original release
- Network: YouTube
- Release: August 24, 2015

Star Trek: Renegades is a 2015 American science fiction fan film based on the Star Trek media franchise. It concerns a group of criminals and misfits who undertake a covert mission when suspicion arises that Starfleet's official military chain of command has been compromised by enemy agents. It was funded largely through crowdsourcing, and the film's producers said they would submit it to CBS as a spec TV pilot. The completed pilot film was released for public viewing via YouTube beginning August 24, 2015.

Plans were announced for a Renegades web-based series, but in 2016 the overt Star Trek elements and characters were removed to avoid legal complications as a result of the Star Trek: Axanar lawsuit.

== Premise ==
Ten years after the starship Voyager's return from the Delta Quadrant, the Federation is in a crisis. The Federation's main suppliers of dilithium crystals (the primary catalyst for the fuel used in faster-than-light travel) are disappearing. Space and time have folded around several planets, isolating them from outside contact. The phenomenon is unnatural —someone or something is causing it to happen. The need to stop this necessitates drastic measures, some of which are outside the Federation’s normal jurisdiction.

Admiral Pavel Chekov, head of Starfleet Intelligence, turns to Commander Tuvok, Voyager's former security officer and current head of the newly reorganized Section 31, Starfleet's autonomous intelligence and defense organization. Tuvok must put together a new covert, renegade crew —mostly outcasts and rogues, and even criminals. This new crew is tasked with finding out what is causing the folding of time and space, and stopping it at all costs. But will they be able to put aside their differences and stop trying to kill one another in time to accomplish their mission?

== Cast ==
- Walter Koenig as Admiral Pavel Chekov
- Adrienne Wilkinson as Captain Lexxa Singh
- Sean Young as Dr. Lucien
- Manu Intiraymi as Icheb
- Gary Graham as Ragnar
- Robert Picardo as Dr. Lewis Zimmerman
- Corin Nemec as Captain Alvarez
- Bruce A. Young as Borrada
- Tim Russ as Tuvok
- Chalet Lizette Brannan as Shane Rallent
- Chasty Ballesteros as Ronara
- Edward Furlong as Fixer
- Courtney Peldon as Shree
- Crystal Conway as Cadet Chekov
- Cirroc Lofton as Jacob
- Larissa Gomes as T’Leah
- Tarah Paige as Commander Petrona
- Cela Scott as Lexxa's Mother
- Kevin Fry as Jaro Ruk
- Clint Carmichael as Moordenaarr
- Rico E. Anderson as Boras
- Vic Mignogna as Garis
- Richard Herd as Admiral Owen Paris
- Madison Russ as Cadet Madison
- Grant Imahara as Lt. Masaru
- Jason Matthew Smith as Malbon
- Herbert Jefferson Jr. as Admiral Grant (Ben) Satterlee
- Sinn Bodhi as Syphon Guard

== Production ==
=== Development ===
The team behind Renegades had previously produced the fan film Star Trek: Of Gods and Men. Renegades was shot at Laurel Canyon Studios in Los Angeles, using green screen techniques. Principal photography commenced on October 2, 2013, and was completed on October 16, 2013, in Los Angeles.

The premise for Renegades originated on the final day of the Of Gods and Men shoot. Jack Treviño made the suggestion of a series in which the cast had to work outside of the boundaries of Starfleet. Writer Ethan Calk later credited this as being the origin of the idea.

The production team announced plans for three possible outcomes from the film: CBS picks it up for a series; it is made into a stand-alone film; or it would be the first episode of an Internet-based series. Ultimately it was made into a stand-alone film. Its running time is 90 minutes.

=== Financing ===
Primary financing was via three successful Kickstarter and Indiegogo campaigns in 2012, 2013, and 2014. Total raised for the film was $375,038. For reference, the film Star Trek Into Darkness had an estimated budget of $190 million. On November 28, 2015, Renegades reached $300,000 in fund raising according to Kickstarter.

=== Casting ===
The cast of Renegades includes several Star Trek alumni, who in some cases reprised their former roles. Garrett Wang was to return as Harry Kim, but had scheduling conflicts with his involvement in Unbelievable!!!!!, a comedy film with other Star Trek alumni actors. Wang expressed interest in returning at a later date. J. G. Hertzler was originally set to play Borrada, the film's main antagonist, but had since taken political office in New York.

Rico E. Anderson was cast as Boras, Richard Herd was cast as Admiral Owen Paris on October 9, 2012. Courtney Peldon was cast as Shree on November 14, 2012. Tim Russ was cast as Tuvok on December 7, 2012. Walter Koenig was cast as Admiral Pavel Chekov on March 4, 2013. Adrienne Wilkinson was cast as Captain Lexxa Singh, leader of the Renegades and a direct descendant of Khan Noonien Singh. Sean Young was cast as Dr. Lucien. Robert Picardo was cast as Dr. Lewis Zimmerman, the developer of the Emergency Medical Hologram program which bears his likeness. Manu Intiraymi reprised his role from Voyager as the Brunali former Borg, Icheb.

Chasty Ballesteros was cast as Ronara, a troubled young Betazoid. Kevin Fry was cast as Jaro Ruk, an unbalanced former Bajoran freedom fighter. Grant Imahara was cast as Lt. Masaru, an aide to Admiral Pavel Chekov. Vic Mignogna was cast as Garis, a vicious Cardassian prisoner.

=== Release ===
Backers of the film were given a limited-time, online-streaming preview of the unfinished film in June 2015. The official premiere took place at Crest Theater, Los Angeles on Saturday, August 1, 2015. Public release of the completed Star Trek: Renegades film began on its own YouTube channel on August 24, 2015, and surpassed one million views by December 18, 2015.

After the official premiere, Star Trek: Renegades was shown on Sunday, September 6, 2015 at Fan Expo Canada in Toronto. In mid-September 2015 it was released at the Alamo City Comic Con in San Antonio, Texas and The Geek Gathering in Sheffield, Alabama. In mid-October 2015, it premiered at the TRIFI (TCIF3) Film Festival in Richland, Washington. In late October 2015, it premiered at Rocket City NerdCon in Huntsville, Alabama.

=== Music ===
The score for the film is by Justin R. Durban.

| Track | Score Listing |
|---|---|
| 01. | Invictus |
| 02. | Last Kill |
| 03. | Assemble A Crew |
| 04. | Heist |
| 05. | Prison |
| 06. | Cadet Chekov |
| 07. | Pursuit |
| 08. | The Mission |
| 09. | Stay True |
| 10. | Photons, Force Fields and Holo-Matter |
| 11. | Sabotage - Shree |
| 12. | In and Out Fast |
| 13. | Spirit Without Discipline |
| 14. | Battlestations |
| 15. | Renegades |
| 16. | Sacrifice |
| 17. | Tunnels of Syphon |
| 18. | One Way Trip |
| 19. | Out of the Night - Make This Fair |
| 20. | They're Up to Something - We Will Annihilate |
| 21. | Breaking Free - A Slow and Painful Death |
| 22. | I'll Stay |
| 23. | Forward |
| 24. | End Credits |

=== Sequel and removal of Star Trek branding ===
The original plans were for Star Trek: Renegades to be a web series. However, on June 25, 2016, in response to new fan film guidelines, the production team announced that they had removed all Star Trek references from the script for the sequel (The Requiem).

== Reception ==
Drew Turney, of moviehole.net wrote:

The story of Star Trek: Renegades has quite a cool premise... The execution is a little less successful, the script feeling a bit under-written and too full of corny tropes that went out of fashion in the sci-fi of the 80s.... It's clear the team behind the movie loves the Star Trek name, and diehard fans are likely to be far more forgiving of the flaws than most (when Robert Picardo showed up as the fan favourite holographic Dr. Zimmerman, it prompted cheers in the screening). But it's very hard to be down on what's essentially fan fiction made on a shoestring by people who've given it their hearts and souls.

In his online video review, Nate "Blunty" Burr said:

It is a bit of a mess. The whole thing. It’s got some production values and cast members that you’d think would be in big-budget impressive stuff who know how to do things, and then huge chunks of it come off as this most horrible, awkward, badly delivered fanfilm... My eyes started to hurt from the amount eye-rolling.... I feel like hardcore Star Trek fans are going to be scared about saying, 'This is a bit shit.' I want more Star Trek on my TV, but not so much that I won't publish a video saying 'this Star Trek Renegades thing is kind of not fantastic.' [But] Worth watching just for the sake of the spectacle."

In her review for Trek News, Michelle T. said:

Some of the effects, particularly space shots and views of the ships, look amazing. The ship designs of the Icarus and the Archer are beautiful. The space battles in general look good, too. It does gradually become obvious that this is a fan film with a limited budget, which is important to keep in mind when judging this. A lot can be forgiven for that reason. Between the good effects with the ships, and some of the cringe-inducing smaller effects, it about evens out. It’s not a homerun, but not a disappointment.... Set and character design, including wardrobe and make-up are pretty hit and miss as well. The interiors of the ships are mostly believable and consistent with the style of other Trek series. Some of the sets, like Chekov’s office, could use a bit more work. The villains’ design and make-up is well done and creative. With some characters, like the Romulan assassin T’Leah, they may have run out of time or money to do much other than slap on some pointy ears and eyebrows.

In his review, Josh Roseman said:

I just wish it had lived up to my expectations. Overall I really didn’t think the writing on this show was as good as Russ’s previous production. The writers (Ethan Calk, Sky Conway, and Jack Treviño) are the same, so I’m not sure what happened. The story hit all the necessary beats, but none of them were really a surprise, except for a few of the deaths that were somewhat unexpected, and the little coda between Chekov and Tuvok. The problem was that we had to extend our brains past the end of Voyager, meet all these new characters, and somehow care about all of them. And there are a lot. I guess I could care about Singh, given time, but her motivations aren’t anything I haven’t seen (or written myself) before. Shree’s hacking scenes were pretty blah, and the villains’ speeches and actions (both the Syphon and the mastermind behind them) weren’t new either. Oh, and why would the Syphon put the Highlander 2 shield around Earth instead of just destroying it, since they clearly have the power to do the latter? Too much narrative convenience for me. Russ is a capable director, but the production design I feel limited him in ways I didn’t see in his previous productions — or even in much lower-budget fan productions, such as the Hidden Frontier series. It was especially evident in the bridge scenes (on both the Icarus and the Archer), as well as the Syphon planetary sequences — both when the crew is sneaking around and when some of them get captured. Everything felt small to me, and there’s only so much a director can do with handheld camera work (of which there was a lot).

=== Awards ===
Star Trek: Renegades won seven of thirteen categories in the 2016 Independent Star Trek Fan Film Awards (Best Production Design; Best Special & Visual Effects; Best Sound Design, Editing & Mixing; Best Makeup & Hairstyling; Best Costuming; Best Director and Best Original Story or Screenplay), presented at and by Treklanta.
