= Out on a Limb (1992 film) =

1992 film by Francis Veber

- Theatrical release poster
- Directed by: Francis Veber
- Written by: Joshua Goldin; Daniel Goldin
- Produced by: Michael Hertzberg
- Starring: Matthew Broderick; Jeffrey Jones; Heidi Kling; John C. Reilly
- Cinematography: Donald Thorin
- Edited by: Glenn Farr
- Music by: Van Dyke Parks
- Production company: Interscope Communications
- Distributed by: Universal Pictures
- Release date: September 4, 1992
- Running time: 82 minutes
- Country: United States
- Language: English
- Budget: $31 million
- Box office: $1,659,542

Out on a Limb is a 1992 comedy film written by Joshua and Daniel Goldin and directed by Francis Veber. It stars Matthew Broderick, Jeffrey Jones, Heidi Kling, Courtney Peldon, Michael Monks, and John C. Reilly.

The film was released by Universal Pictures on September 4, 1992. It reunited Broderick and Jones following Ferris Bueller's Day Off six years earlier.

== Plot ==
The story is set within the framing device of Marci describing her wacky summer vacation to her elementary school class.

Marci believed she saw her stepfather, Mayor Van Der Haven murdered by his twin brother Matt Skearns, who then comically attempts to impersonate the missing mayor.

She calls her older brother, successful young businessman Bill Campbel to return to their hometown of Buzzsaw and help expose the crime.

On Bill's way to Buzzsaw, his car, clothes, and wallet are stolen by a woman named Sally and he is forced to hitchhike home naked, where he is picked up by two drunken brothers—both named Jim. The wallet contains an important phone number that Campbell must recover, so he seeks Sally while avoiding the diabolical Skearns, who is looking for financial compensation after spending 15 years in prison for a crime committed by his twin brother.

The film ends with Skearns dropping his glasses and accidentally driving off a cliff to his death. Bill, who has fallen in love with Sally, stays with her in Buzzsaw, planning to run for mayor.

== Cast ==
- Matthew Broderick as Bill Campbell
- Jeffrey Jones as Matt Skearns / Peter Van Der Haven
- Heidi Kling as Sally
- John C. Reilly as Jim Jr.
- Courtney Peldon as Marci Campbell
- Nancy Lenehan as Miss Clayton
- Marian Mercer as Ann Campbell Van Der Haven
- Michael Monks as Jim Sr.
- David Margulies as Mr. Buchenwald
- Larry Hankin as Officer Darren
- Andy Kossin as Officer Larry
- Mickey Jones as Virgil
- Noah Craig Andrews as Julius
- Benjamin Diskin as Henry
- Adam Wylie as Bob

== Production ==
=== Development ===
Writers and identical twin brothers Joshua and Daniel Goldin took inspiration for their script from the Yiddish folk tale Wise Men of Chelm. The script, under the title of Welcome to Buzzsaw was purchased by Universal Pictures by 1986 where it went through a development cycle wherein the Goldin's would not have their first on screen credit until 1990 when they were listed among the writers for Darkman. The Goldins would primarily work in this manner functioning more as uncredited contributors or script doctors on studio projects.

The film was first announced in February 1989 under the title of Welcome to Buzzsaw with Todd Holland set to make his feature directorial debut and Val Kilmer and Julia Roberts set to star. For this incarnation of the film, described as a dark comedy, Kilmer was to star as a man returning to his hometown of Buzzsaw for his mother’s wedding. But complications arise when her husband-to-be, the town's mayor, has an identical twin who arrives with the intention to exact his vengeance for being scapegoated by the town to avoid a scandal. Filming was reportedly set to begin in March of that year. Ultimately, this incarnation of the project would not come to pass and Holland would instead make his debut with Universal's The Wizard.

=== Director and cast switch ===
In August 1990, it was reported that Francis Veber was now set to direct the film with Matthew Broderick in the lead. In December of that year, it was reported that Jeffrey Jones had joined the cast. While Veber had extensive experience as a screenwriter, the film marked his first time directing a script he had not written himself; he noted that unlike working in France it was very difficult to write something by himself while working in Hollywood. Veber stated what appealed to him about the script was how it went "much further" than material he would write himself and compared the script to A Fish Called Wanda and welcomed the opportunity to do such a film. Veber further observed:

There is a difference between the two countries' sensitivity. You don't like antiheroes here. The worst accusation is for a hero to be a wimp. We love that in Europe -- people who cry and are emotional.

According to Everett Weinberger who was working as a staffer at Interscope Communications during production, producer Robert W. Cort and Veber sparred frequently during the production. Weinberger overheard one of Cort's discussions with a colleague where he was heard to remark:

I'm so tired of this shit – you have no idea. I know I'm being obsessive-compulsive, but that French fucker is driving me crazy. Francis says to me yesterday, 'Bob you can't take away my vision for zees project'. Vision – Vision with a fuckin' tits-and-ass scene in a teeny-bopper film.

Everett would take a copy of the script out of curiosity calling the experience of reading it "disheartening" to learn that a script this poorly written and filled with plot holes and cliches had somehow been made by a major motion picture company with a sizable budget.

Veber later described his experience of this production as very difficult, with Broderick uncooperative and unwilling to comply with what he had agreed upon prior to shooting; he called the finished product "the most horrible film ever done".

=== Filming and reshoots ===
Production on the film began in December 1990 in Los Angeles, California. The offices of Bear Stearns and Company, Inc were used for the Simon Brothers while the Artemesia estate in the Hollywood Hills was utilized as the Van der Haven Mansion. Further filming took place in Boulder Creek, California which filled in for the setting of Buzzsaw. Following disastrous test screenings, Universal Pictures scrapped the film's original planned October 1991 release and several reshoots were ordered by the studio. The most prominent change of the reshoots was the inclusion of a frame story wherein Courtney Peldon's character Marci Campbell tells her school class the film's events in a "How I Spent My Summer Vacation" story despite her character not being present for many of the events which take place.

== Release ==
The film was theatrically released on September 4, 1992 Labor Day weekend where it opened in 13th place with an opening weekend of $1,114,255 and was pulled after a week with a total gross of $1,659,542. A home video release followed on December 23, 1992.

== Reception ==
The film was described by the Los Angeles Times as a "numbskull comedy," in an article that summarized the plot as "a nonstop series of increasingly unfunny slapstick incidents".

Out on a Limb holds a 20% rating on Rotten Tomatoes based on five reviews.

Director Francis Veber called the film's commercial failure "well-deserved". Out on a Limb was such an unpleasant experience for him that he would never direct a film from a script that he had not personally written himself.
