= A. W. Merrick =

American businessman (1840–1902)

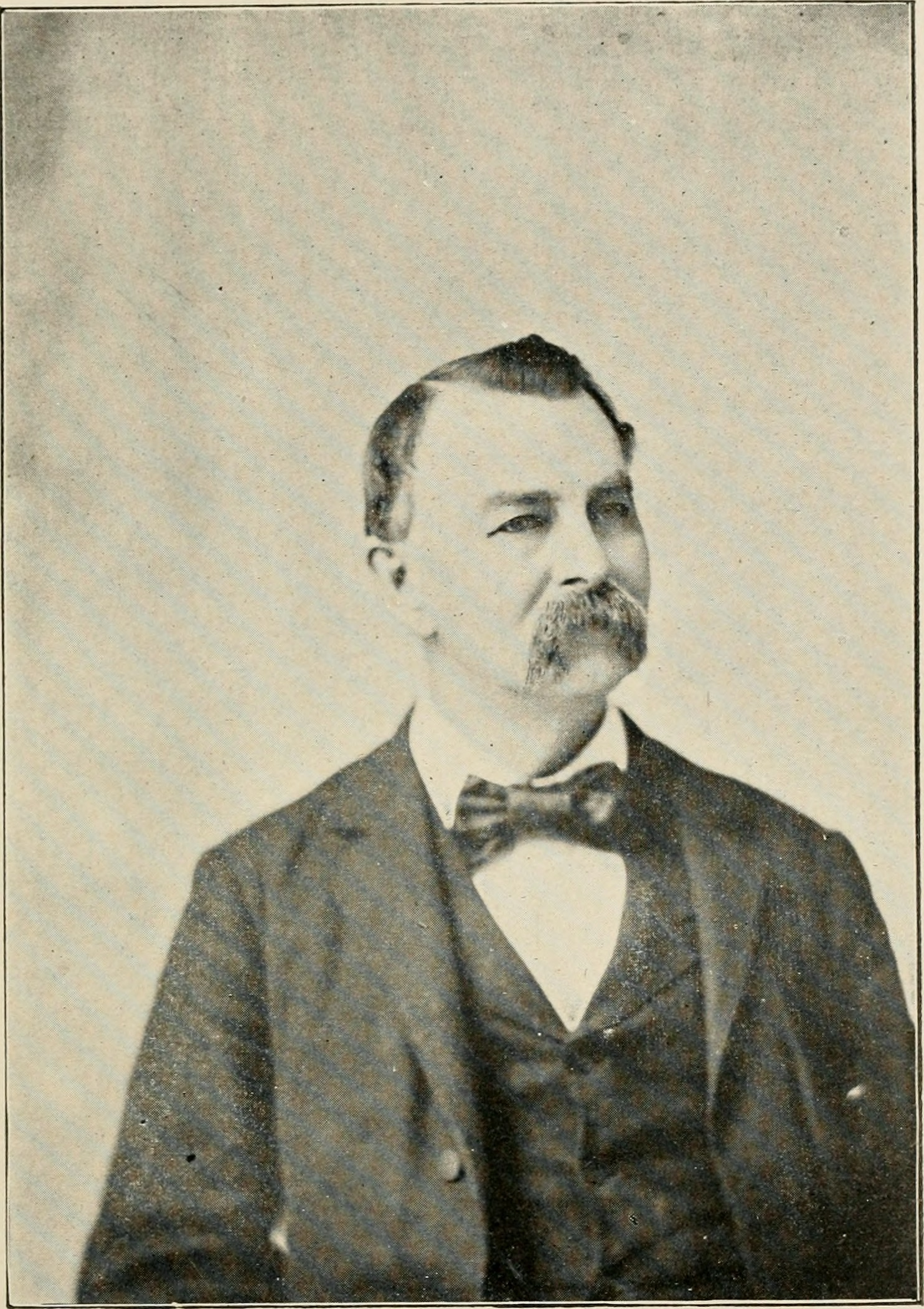
- A. W. Merrick
- Born: Albert Walter Merrick; December 24, 1840; New York, United States
- Died: February 26, 1902 (aged 61); United States
- Occupation: Journalist
- Writing career
- Language: English
- Genre: Journalism

Albert Walter Merrick (December 24, 1840 – February 26, 1902) was an American journalist who published the first newspaper in Deadwood, South Dakota, the Black Hills Weekly Pioneer, along with W. A. Laughlin. The newspaper continues to be published today, but has moved its offices to Spearfish, South Dakota.

== Personal ==
Merrick was born in New York in 1840 and served in the Civil War, rising to the rank of sergeant. Census records indicate that Merrick was living in Deadwood in 1880, when his occupation was listed as editor.

Merrick was married to Rachel Margaret Davis (1845–1924), known as "Ray" Merrick, who was born in Tredegar, Monmouthshire, Wales. She immigrated to the United States in 1864.

The Merricks had at least five children. In 1880, they had two children; Walter M. Merrick (1872–1880), who died in Deadwood after the census was taken, and Marie Blanche Merrick (b. 1876 Colorado). Albert and Rachel also had a daughter, Louise May Merrick, born in Butte, Montana around 1881; another son, Albert Wilbur Merrick, born in Deadwood in 1882; and another daughter, Zeta Marguerite Merrick, born in Deadwood in 1888. Albert Wilbur Merrick also entered the newspaper industry and became a printer.

In 1899, Merrick was listed as an invalid in veteran pension records. He died in 1902 and was buried at Mount Moriah Cemetery in Deadwood.

== Career ==
Merrick created the Black Hills Weekly Pioneer in Deadwood in May 1876. The first paper was published on June 8, 1876, and is still printed today as the Black Hills Pioneer.

== In popular culture ==
Merrick is portrayed by actor Jeffrey Jones in the television series Deadwood (2004–2006) and the film continuation Deadwood: The Movie (2019).
