= Hot Flash Heat Wave =

American indie rock band

- Origin: Davis, California, U.S. Excelsior District, San Francisco
- Label: OIM Records
- Members: Ted Davis; Adam Abildgaard; Nick Duffy
- Past members: Nathaniel Blüm
- Website: www.hotflashheatwave.com

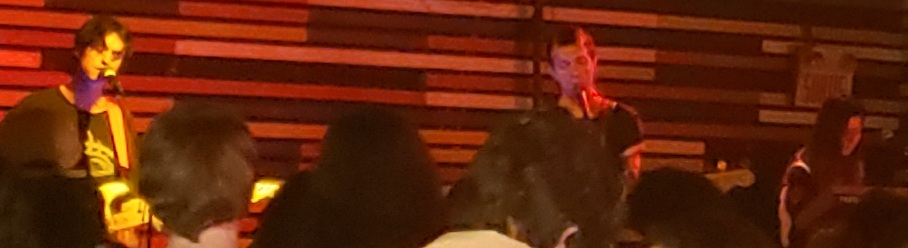
Hot Flash Heat Wave photographed in Montréal, Québec, Canada at the Ritz PDB.

Hot Flash Heat Wave is an American indie rock band originally from Davis, California, now based in the Excelsior District of San Francisco, California. Their sound has been described as "surfer pop meets post punk" and "dream pop".

== History ==
The members of Hot Flash Heat Wave all grew up in Davis, California, and first met in high school. The members came up with the name Hot Flash Heat Wave due to a period of hot weather in San Francisco. In 2015, Hot Flash Heat Wave released their first full-length album, Neapolitan. In June 2016, the band released their first song since their debut full-length album, titled "Bye Bye Baby". In March 2017, Hot Flash Heat Wave announced their second full-length album, released by OIM Records. The album, titled Soaked, was released on June 2, 2017. The album was produced by Jeff Saltzman.

In November 2018, Hot Flash Heat Wave released a song titled "Dreaming of U", featuring Sophie Meiers. In early 2019, they released another new song, titled "Sky So Blue". In September 2020, the band released their song titled "Grudge". Throughout 2021, the group released three singles, "m o t i o n s", "Vampires", and "Where I'm @". The group released a single called "Bay Boys" on the 11 February 2022 followed by the album Sportswear on 11 March.

== Band members ==
- Ted Davis - Bass and Vocals
- Adam Abildgaard - Guitar and Vocals
- Nick Duffy - Drums

== Discography ==
Studio albums

- Neapolitan (2015)
- Soaked (2017)
- Mood Ring EP (2019)
- Sportswear (2022)
- Butterfly in a Landslide (2026)
