= Rozanne =

Rozanne is a given name. Notable people with the name include:

- Rozanne Botha (1959–2022), South African singer-songwriter, daughter of P.W. Botha
- Rozanne Colchester (1922–2016), worked in British intelligence
- Rozanne Foyer (born 1972), Scottish trade unionist
- Rozanne Gold, American chef, journalist, cookbook author, international restaurant consultant
- Rozanne Kruger, South African academic, dietitian, professor at Griffith University
- Rozanne Pollack (born 1948), American bridge player
- Rozanne L. Ridgway (born 1935), American diplomat
- Rozanne Slik (born 1991), Dutch racing cyclist
- Rozanne Voorvelt (born 2001), Dutch water polo player
- Rozanne Zingale, American film editor and producer
