= Alien from L.A. =

1988 American film by Albert Pyun

- Theatrical release poster
- Directed by: Albert Pyun
- Written by: Judith Berg (credited as Debra Ricci); Sandra Berg (credited as Regina Davis); Albert Pyun
- Produced by: Menahem Golan; Yoram Globus
- Starring: Kathy Ireland; William R. Moses; Richard Haines; Don Michael Paul; Thom Mathews; Janet Du Plessis; Simon Poland
- Cinematography: Tom Fraser
- Edited by: Daniel Loewenthal
- Music by: Jim Andron; Simon LeGassick; Anthony Riparetti; James Saad
- Production company: Golan-Globus Productions
- Distributed by: The Cannon Group
- Release date: February 26, 1988
- Running time: 87 minutes
- Country: United States
- Language: English

Alien from L.A. is a 1988 American science fiction film co-written and directed by Albert Pyun. The film stars Kathy Ireland as a young woman who visits the underground civilization of Atlantis. The film was featured on Mystery Science Theater 3000. This film is loosely based on Jules Verne's 1864 novel Journey to the Center of the Earth with some minor allusions to The Wizard of Oz.

== Plot ==
Wanda Saknussemm is a nerdy social misfit with large glasses and an unusually squeaky voice who lives in Los Angeles and works at a diner. After being dumped by her boyfriend for "not having a sense of adventure," Wanda is informed by letter that her father, an archaeologist, fell into a bottomless pit and died. She flies to Zamboanga, North Africa ("Deepest Africa," says the envelope's return address). While going through her father's belongings, she finds his notes about Atlantis, the creation of which was apparently the result of an alien ship that crashed millennia ago and sank to the center of the Earth. Wanda comes across a chamber beneath her father's apartment and accidentally sets off a chain of events that ultimately causes her to fall into a deep hole.

An unharmed Wanda wakes up deep within the Earth to find Gus, a miner whom she protects from being slain by two antagonists. Gus agrees to help Wanda find her father, whom she believes is alive and trapped underground. Wanda soon discovers that both she and her father are believed to be spies planning an invasion of Atlantis. People from the surface world are referred to as "aliens" by Atlanteans—who happen to appear virtually identical to surface dwellers—and when Wanda is overheard talking about Malibu Beach by a low-life informant, she soon becomes a hunted woman and must dodge efforts at capture, both from the mysterious "Government House" as well as from thugs in the pay of the crime lord Mambino.

Wanda's efforts at escape are aided by Charmin', a handsome rogue who (briefly) assists her flight and falls in love with Wanda. She is ultimately captured by the evil General Rykov, who wants to kill both Wanda and her incarcerated father. Before the Atlantean leader can decide what to do with Wanda and her father, Gus shows up and helps the duo escape while fighting off General Rykov and her soldiers. Wanda and her father board a ship that takes them back to the surface, and the film ends with Wanda on the beach, wearing a bikini and a sarong. She refuses the advances of her ex-boyfriend, and is soon reunited with Charmin', who inexplicably appears on a motorcycle.

== Cast ==
- Kathy Ireland as Wanda Saknussemm
- William R. Moses as Guten "Gus" Edway
- Richard Haines as Professor Arnold Saknussemm
- Don Michael Paul as Robbie
- Thom Mathews as Charmin'
- Janie Du Plessis as General Rykov / Shank / Claims Officer
- Simon Poland as Consul Triton Crassus / The Mailman
- Linda Kerridge as Roryis Freki / Auntie Pearl
- Kristen Trucksess as Stacy
- Lochner de Kock as Professor Ovid Galba / Paddy Mahoney
- Deep Roy as Mambino

== Production ==
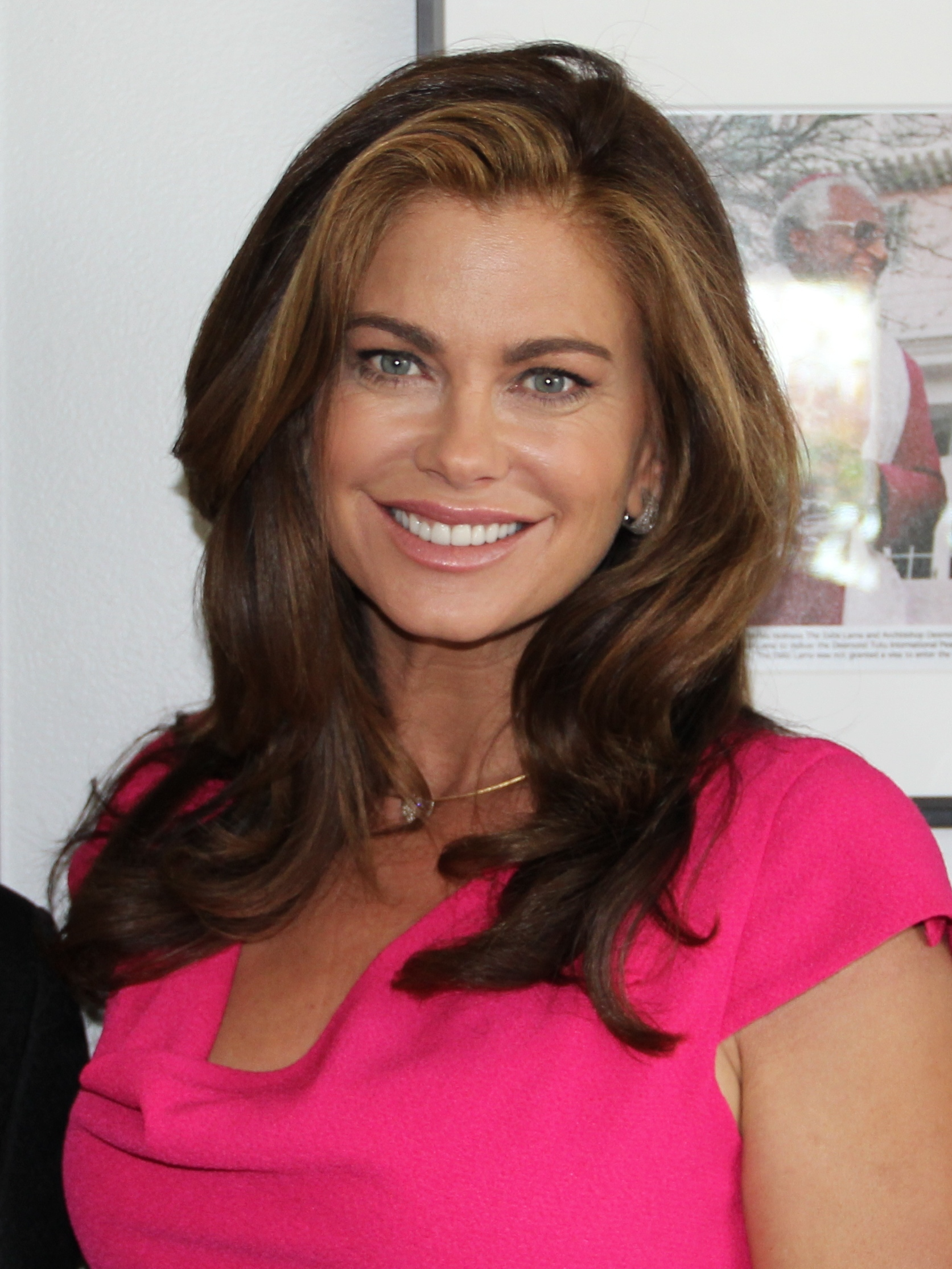
Kathy Ireland plays the film's lead Wanda Saknussemm.

During the troubled production of the Rusty Lemorande-directed Journey to the Center of the Earth, producers Yoram Globus and Menahem Golan, dissatisfied with Lemorande's rough cut, approached Albert Pyun to finish the film. Pyun accepted the job, saying he would finish the film for free if they allowed him to film Alien from L.A. for under $1 million as a repurposed version of Pyun's own Journey to the Center of the Earth, which they ultimately agreed to.

=== Casting ===
Kathy Ireland was chosen by director Albert Pyun after seeing a photo of her, and without doing a screen test. Ireland had little acting experience at the time, stating "No one was more surprised than I was," also saying that she took acting lessons after being cast. The film was Ireland's debut in a major motion picture. According to director Albert Pyun, Ireland was chosen for her tall stature, as he wanted to illustrate a physical difference between people from the surface and people who were closer to the Earth's center. The character's surname of "Saknussemm" is taken from the original Journey to the Center of the Earth by Jules Verne.

Ireland says that changes were made to her character between the time when she was cast and when filming began:

"And when I got on the set I found out that they had changed my whole character around which surprised me but I liked her better. When I read for the part she had been a flirty Madonna type. They had changed her to a geeky clumsy shy type of girl which I liked better. The changes made her more likable and I was able to draw on a couple of periods in my life when I went through awkward phases."

=== Filming ===
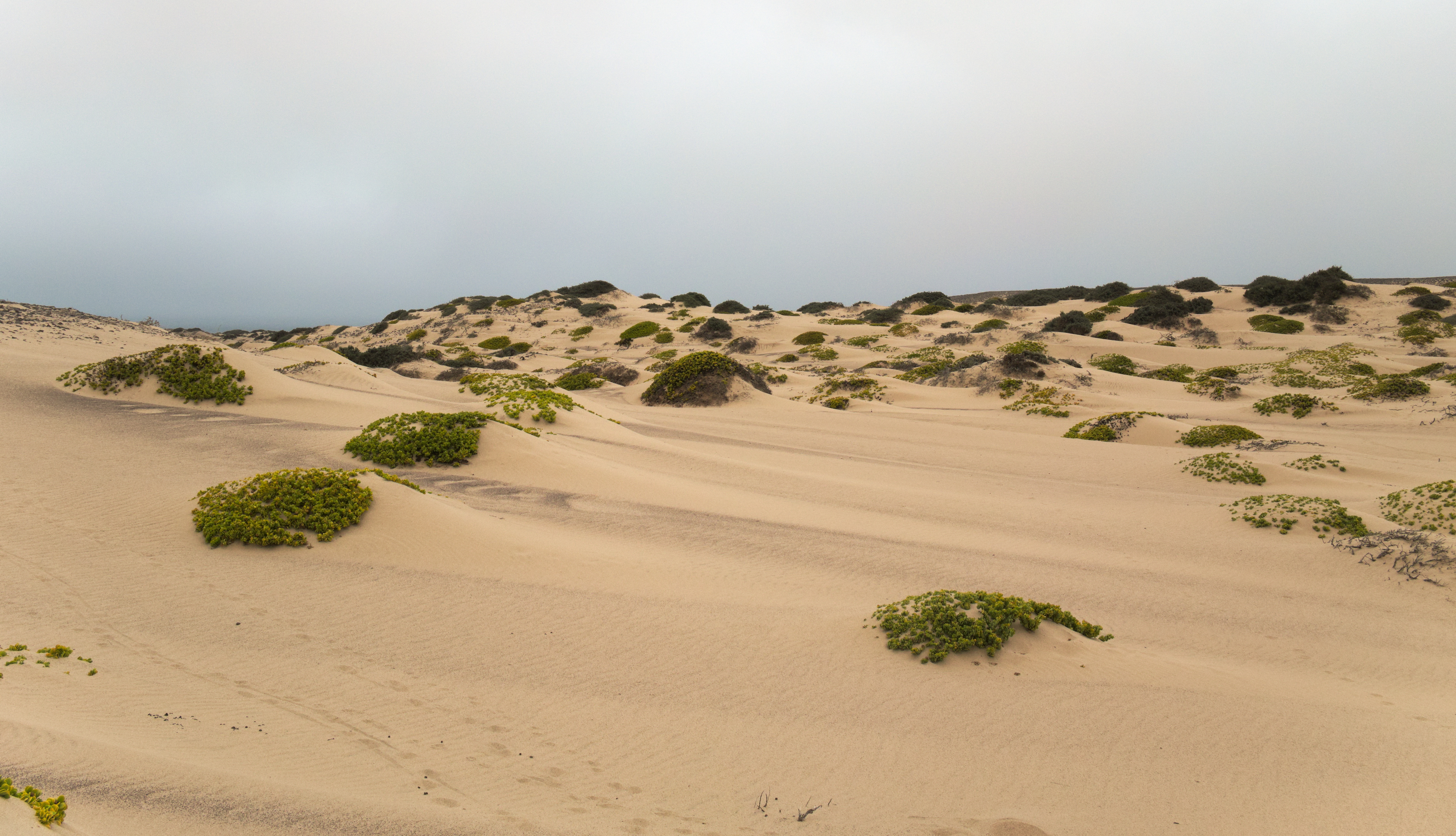
Namibia's Skeleton Coast

The filming locations for the film include Los Angeles, Redondo Beach, South Africa, and Namibia. Pyun was asked by Cannon to film in South Africa due to positive relations between the Israeli Globus and Golan, as well as their desire to use "blocked funds" that could not be taken out from the country per South African government mandates. The various gold mines and gold dumps located around South Africa served as shooting locations for the underground setpieces as residue left over from the mining operations created an unusual looking landscape.

The film was mostly shot in Johannesburg at producer Avi Lerner's studio, plus additional shooting in Durban, South Africa and Swakopmund, Namibia. Locations included South Africa's deep-digging mines and gold fields, both on the outskirts of Johannesburg. There was one additional day of shooting at a safari complex near Pretoria. Most of the Namibia shoot took place in and around the old German colonial town of Swakopmund, with additional scenes also shot along Namibia's famed Skeleton Coast.

The sets of the film are inspired by "future noir" from films such as Alien (1979) and Blade Runner (1982). Two songs used in the film were "Once Upon a Time," performed by Steve LeGassick, and "State of Heart," performed by Donna DeLory.

== Release ==
Alien from L.A. was released in theaters on February 26, 1988, and on VHS by Media Home Entertainment in June 1995. It was later released on DVD by MGM on June 7, 2005, paired with Morons from Outer Space; the only special feature for the release was the film's trailer. It has been released and is currently available in a Blu-ray edition by Vinegar Syndrome that includes an interview with director Albert Pyun, an interview with actor Thom Mathews, and an audio interview with actress Linda Kerridge. Alien from L.A. was followed by a nominal, direct-to-video sequel called Journey to the Center of the Earth (also directed by Albert Pyun), which was released in the United States in 1989. The film had Kathy Ireland reprising her role as Wanda Saknussemm.

== Reception ==
Joe Bob Briggs called it a "pretty decent film," awarding it two stars. Rebecca Harris of the Abilene Reporter-News gave the film 2.5 stars out of 4. Film reviewer David Picking said the film was "a cheapo adventure movie without a single redeeming quality."

Reviewing the DVD release, Rob Thomas of The Capital Times, said "Completely awful – you can't believe they're serious." Daniel M. Kimmel of the Worcester Telegram & Gazette gave the film one out of five stars.

Review aggregator Rotten Tomatoes gives it 22% based on 9 reviews.
