= The Framework =

Canadian indie-rock band

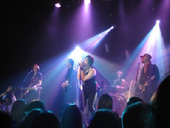
- The Framework

Background information
- Origin: Toronto, Ontario, Canada
- Genres: Indie rock, alternative rock, new wave
- Years active: 2006–2011
- Label: Last Gang Labels
- Past members: Ryan Isojima; Chris Graham; Rayanne Lepieszo; Jon Fedorsen; Scott Winter; Tobias Smith

The Framework was a new-wave inspired indie-rock band from Toronto, Ontario, formed in late 2006. In January 2007, the band's song "She Thinks I'm Famous" was a finalist in the Radiostar Songwriting Contest sponsored by Mix 99.9. Shortly after forming, the band received press in high-profile publications, including Metro Daily and InsideE Magazine. The Framework headlined both Canadian Music Week and NXNE in Toronto in 2008 and were named one of five top acts by InsideE Magazine.

The band's lineup consists of Ryan Isojima (vocals/guitar), Chris Graham (vocals/guitar/programming), Rayanne Lepieszo (synths), Scott Winter (bass) and Jon Fedorsen (drums).

The Framework's live show has garnered attention for being energetic and enthralling. Live, lead singer Isojima has been described as a combination of frenetic dance moves, unparalleled charisma, inspired swagger, charm, stage presence and magnetism. Singing lead on some songs, Graham has been described as being equally compelling but with a wholly differential energy, endearingly coy.

To date the band has released two EPs, 2007's The Framework and 2008's The Framework Reworked, as well as their full-length debut album in 2009 titled Before Tonight, distributed by Last Gang Labels. The Framework has worked with high-profile remixers The RAC and vitaminsforyou. Both the band's debut EP and debut full-length album were self-produced by Chris Graham and Ryan Isojima, and recorded, mixed and mastered by Graham at a combination of rehearsal spaces and Graham's home studios.

== History ==
=== Early history ===
The members of The Framework were all in various bands or performed as solo artists in and around Toronto before they came together. Isojima performed as a singer-songwriter under the name Chisai Jackson, during which time he had several development deals in the works, released several independent albums and was an early contestant on the television show Rockstar: INXS. Graham performed and released a self-produced album as a solo-songwriter, as well as an EP as The Chris Graham Band, whose song "Call" became a finalist and eventual audience favourite in a televised songwriting contest. Lepieszo performed as a singer-songwriter including opening for Emm Gryner, and Winter and Smith as part of the rock band The Hitch.

=== The Framework EP era (2007) ===
As a lark, Isojima created a Myspace page in October 2006 for a group called The Framework that at that point had no members and no music, listing Graham and Lepieszo's names with a rhythm section to be decided later. Isojima pitched the idea to Graham of starting this new band together, pointing him to the new Myspace page, and Graham agreed despite having decided only a day prior to take a break from performing after touring his solo albums for the few years prior. Both looked forward to the opportunity though, as they had never before collaborated as songwriters despite being friends for years and sharing the stage numerous times while pursuing their respective solo careers.

Graham and Isojima met soon after at Graham's home studio to work on the first song that would launch the band's career, "She Thinks I'm Famous". Following this successful session, Lepieszo heard the demos and eagerly signed on. Graham and Isojima continued to collaborate on what would be the remainder of the songs for their first self-titled EP. On a whim, before they had a full band or performed live, Graham and Isojima entered "She Thinks I'm Famous" in the Mix 99.9 FM Radiostar Contest, and the song placed third, resulting in the band's Myspace page being flooded with traffic.

At this point Graham approached drummer Tobias Smith, whom he knew through musical circles in Toronto, to flesh out the band's roster. Smith then referred bassist Scott Winter, a former bandmate from the band The Hitch. The Framework spent January to July 2007 rehearsing for what would be a full house for their CD release party for The Framework EP at the Rivoli on July 14, 2007. Hype began to build towards the release as former friends and fans of the band members' previous solo careers anticipated what the new collaboration would sound and look like.

From this point on, the band made a mutual pledge to use their past industry experience to their advantage. They agreed to only play one Toronto gig a month - including high-profile performances at the Horseshoe and the Mod Club - a conscious decision to avoid overexposure and ensure well-promoted shows.

=== The Framework Reworked era (2008) ===
In early 2008, The Framework released The Framework Reworked, a six-song digital-only EP of remixes by high-profile remixers such as The RAC and vitaminsforyou, based on the original six songs from the first The Framework EP.

=== Before Tonight era (2009–2011) ===
The Framework signed with Last Gang Labels in April 2009, to release their first full-length album Before Tonight. This represented a collection of songs created and recorded in various phases over the previous two years, including some featuring tracks recorded during The Framework EP sessions. Despite the amount of time spent on the album, it has been reported by the band that the total out of pocket costs for recording were only $130 because it was entirely self-produced. Despite this, the album has been described as "impeccably polished, so razor sharp", and a "continuous rock candy party with pervasive synth assaults and liberal amounts of studio gloss". MuchMusic described it as "jam packed with great tracks, each one as good as the next".

The album reached No. 4 in sales in Toronto for the week of August 18, No. 2 on the CIUT 89.5 campus radio chart, and the video for the single "Always Left Behind" reached No. 3 on the MuchMoreMusic Top10 Video Countdown.

The Framework shot the video for the song "Starlight" around New Year's Eve at the end of 2009, directed by Steven Grayhm and starring Kirsten Prout. The video features scenes shot around Toronto landmarks such as Dundas Square and the Distillery District.

In late January 2011, The Framework's remaining members parted ways. Graham began fronting a new band, FIRExFIRE, with Framework alumni Winter and Fedorson, whose first gig was opening for former Framework drummer Tobias Smith's band Atomic Tom at the El Mocambo in February 2011.

In February 2012, Isojima and Lepieszo announced their highly anticipated new band, Mr. and Mrs. Fox, and the release of their forthcoming EP States (available in spring 2012). The first single, "Glass Houses", was released on their Bandcamp on February 14, 2012.

== Discography ==
=== Singles ===
- "Always Left Behind" (2009)
- "Starlight" (2010)

=== EPs ===
- The Framework (2007)
- The Framework Reworked (2008)
- The Starlight EP (2010)

=== Albums ===
Year	Details	Peak campus radio chart positions					Peak sales chart positions
Year	Details	Toronto	Nanaimo	Kamloops	Hamilton	Calgary	Peak sales chart positions
2009	Before Tonight: Released: August 4, 2009; Label: Last Gang Labels	2	7	9	10	11	No. 4 - (Toronto) week of August 18, 2009

=== Videos ===
- "Always Left Behind" (2009)
- "Starlight" (Original and Director's cut versions) (2010)

== See also ==
- Music of Canada
- Canadian rock
- List of Canadian musicians
- List of bands from Canada
- Category:Canadian musical groups
