= Fight for Life (film) =

1987 television film directed by Elliot Silverstein

- Genre: Drama
- Written by: Thomas Nesi; Scott Nisor
- Directed by: Elliot Silverstein
- Starring: Jerry Lewis; Patty Duke; Morgan Freeman
- Music by: Laurence Rosenthal
- Country of origin: United States
- Original language: English

Production
- Executive producers: Charles Fries; Irv Wilson
- Producer: Ian McDougall
- Production location: Toronto
- Cinematography: Albert J. Dunk
- Editor: Leslie Dennis
- Running time: 95 minutes
- Production company: Fries Entertainment

Original release
- Network: ABC
- Release: March 23, 1987

Fight for Life is a 1987 American made-for-television drama film starring Jerry Lewis (in his television film debut), Patty Duke and Morgan Freeman. It was originally broadcast on March 23, 1987, on ABC.

== Plot ==
Dr. Bernard Abrams, an Ohio optometrist, and his wife Shirley Abrams have a six-year-old daughter that has a rare form of epilepsy. The child's paraplegic doctor cares for her. As for the little girl's parents, they need to have a drug approved from the Food and Drug Administration. However, the process is slow and they are forced to fly to England to obtain the medication. They take their cause to the media in order to highlight their case and force the FDA to expedite its decision on use in America.

== Cast ==
- Jerry Lewis : Dr. Bernard Abrams
- Patty Duke : Shirley Abrams
- Barry Morse : Dr. Whalley
- Morgan Freeman : Dr. Sherard
- Jaclyn Bernstein : Felice Abrams
- Gérard Parkes : Father Robert Hunt
- Robert Benson : Dr. Keith
- Rosemary Dunsmore
- Patricia Hamilton

== Home media ==
The film was released twice on DVD. The first release was on September 4, 2012, on a Morgan Freeman dual release with Moll Flanders. It was later released on October 31, 2012, on an Amazon exclusive dual 'Family Film' release with Dominick and Eugene.

Prior to 2023, it was available to stream on Paramount+.
