= Even Lambs Have Teeth =

- Directed by: Terry Miles
- Written by: Terry Miles
- Starring: Kirsten Prout; Tiera Skovbye
- Release date: October 2, 2015 (Mile High Horror)
- Running time: 79 minutes
- Countries: Canada; France
- Language: English

Even Lambs Have Teeth is a 2015 Canadian-French rape and revenge film written and directed by Terry Miles and starring Kirsten Prout and Tiera Skovbye. The film tells the story of two young women who take revenge on the sex trafficking ring that kidnapped and abused them.

== Plot ==
After graduating college, two friends named Katie and Sloan decide to work on a rural, organic farm for a month with plans for a follow-up trip to New York City. Katie's uncle, an FBI agent, drives them to the bus station and instructs them to send him a daily coded text to ensure their safety as they travel.

As Katie and Sloan wait for the bus at a restaurant, two handsome boys, Lucas and Jed offer them a ride to the farm. Although Katie is hesitant, Sloan pushes her to accept the offer. They both get into the boys' truck. However, the boys do not stop at the farm and instead make a detour at Jed's family home. The girls are introduced to the boys' mother, who serves them food that causes them to black out.

When they regain consciousness, the girls find themselves in their underwear and chained inside large storage containers in the middle of the woods. They discover they are the victims of a sexual exploitation ring run by Boris. As Boris looks through Katie's phone, he notices the coded text but unaware that it must be changed daily, sends out a text stating everything is fine. He instructs the boys to prepare the girls, who are then sexually assaulted by the local sheriff, a man in a pig mask, and another local.

The uncle notices something amiss in his niece's follow up text and decides to search for the girls. He shows up back in town and speaks with the local sheriff, who tries to lighten the uncle's concerns. After being tipped off by the sheriff of the FBI's presence, Boris orders Jed to dispose of the girls and to "dump them where they dumped the others".

Undeterred, the uncle speaks with the employee of the restaurant, who recognizes the girls and tells the uncle that he saw them leave with a couple of boys in a blue truck. The uncle uses the description given to track down the owner: Boris.

Back at the storage containers, Katie is forced to engage with the local from earlier. At first she plays along but then kills him by biting into his jugular. Katie retrieves the keys and frees herself and Sloan. As the sheriff arrives on the scene, he finds the body of the local but turns around to find his police car stolen by the girls. Primed for revenge, the girls stop by a hardware store and stock up on makeshift weapons.

Boris arrives home to find himself ambushed by the two girls. They interrogate him for information on the remaining accomplices and as soon as he relinquishes, the girls kill him. With the uncle in town, the girls track down the remaining accomplices and murder each one in increasingly inventive ways until everyone involved has perished.

Some time later, the uncle visits Katie and Sloan as they leave for their New York trip. Katie's mother asks the uncle if she should be worried. The uncle replies with, "They're smart girls, they'll be fine".

At the airport, Katie and Sloan walk past a mysterious man who sports a sign for organic farms and warmly greets another pair of potential victims.

== Cast ==
- Kirsten Prout as Sloan
- Tiera Skovbye as Katie
- Garrett Black as Jed
- Darren Mann as Travis
- Jameson Parker as Lucas
- Michael Karl Richards as Jason
- Christian Sloan as The Pastor
- Patrick Gilmore as Boris
- Graem Beddoes as Cigarette Man
- Craig March as Sheriff Andrews
- Gwynyth Walsh as Mother

== Release ==
The film had its worldwide premiere at the Mile High Horror Film Festival on October 2, 2015. It was then released on VOD/digital and cable platforms on May 2, 2017. It was also released on DVD and digital platforms in the United Kingdom on June 13, 2016.

== Reception ==
On Bloody Disgusting, Patrick Cooper wrote that the film "reaches a nice balance of human horror, dark comedy, and violent revenge flick. Usurping expectations while delivering a rowdy crowd-pleaser is a tough one."
