= Once Upon a Christmas (film) =

2000 TV film by Tibor Takács

- DVD cover
- Written by: Steven H. Berman
- Directed by: Tibor Takács
- Starring: Kathy Ireland; John Dye; Douglas Campbell; Mary Donnelly Haskell
- Music by: Guy Zerafa; Alex Khaskin
- Countries of origin: Canada; United States
- Original language: English

Production
- Producers: Jon Carrasco; Deboragh Gabler; Stephen Roseberry; Prince Edward, Duke of Edinburgh
- Editor: Ellen Fine
- Running time: 90 minutes

Original release
- Network: PAX Network
- Release: December 10, 2000

Related
- Twice Upon a Christmas

Once Upon a Christmas is a 2000 family film directed by Tibor Takács. It stars Kathy Ireland, John Dye, and Mary Donnelly-Haskell. The filming location was in Vancouver, British Columbia. It premiered on the PAX Network. As of 2009, it is shown in the 25 Days of Christmas programming block on ABC Family. In 2012, it was broadcast on the Hallmark Channel.

== Plot ==
After Santa Claus has noticed how many children have become naughty, he decides that he will not deliver presents to any children this year. But his daughter, Kristin Claus, takes on the challenge of trying to deliver presents to children around the world. She makes a deal with people in the North Pole that she would change a family on "Santa's Naughty List" to be on the "Nice List". She uses her magic to go to the Morgan house, a family of a single father and two spoiled children, and try to change them to nice. But the children are tricked by Rudolfa, Kristin's sister, who wants to turn Christmas into a joking holiday. Kristin was mistaken as a nanny for the children and played along with the role.

The children begin to resent Kristin, and Kyle even tells their dad that Kristin is dangerous. Kyle tries to engage Brittany into it. They treated Kristin badly and she left the Morgan house when no one was at home. Bill Morgan became work-obsessed since his wife died. On a work-trip he carried along the children and their uncle and took a rest stop at a diner. They met Kristin there (she used her magic to meet them there) and Bill convinced her to look after the children on the trip. The family (and Kristen) take an unexpected detour. Rudolfa uses her magic to make a fake detour sign and sends the family in the middle of nowhere. She also sent an elf dressed as a deer into the middle of the road, causing them to swerve into a ditch. They spend the night at a nearby old, abandoned house, where Kristin confronts Bill about his own selfish ways. The kids continue to act selfish and bratty, but Bill and Kristin don't put up with it. Brittany soon realizes that she is behaving bratty and makes the family breakfast-in-bed from some food supplies she found in the house. A fire breaks out, and Kyle, the family's son almost dies. Kristin gives her immortality to save him, but she now cannot remember her past.

== Cast ==
Actor	Role
Kathy Ireland	Kristin Claus
John Dye	Bill Morgan
Douglas Campbell	Santa Claus
Mary Donnelly Haskell	Rudolfa Claus
Wayne Thomas Yorke	Uncle Johnny
Robin Avery	Sandman
Rebecca Toolan	Clara Claus
Kirsten Prout	Brittany Morgan
James Kirk	Kyle Morgan
Arturo Gil	Wahoo
Rachelle Carson	Harley Jones
Liz Torres	The Tooth Fairy

== Sequel ==
A sequel, Twice Upon a Christmas, followed in 2001.

== Home media ==
The film was released by CBS Home Entertainment through Paramount Home Entertainment on DVD November 7, 2006.

== Reception ==
Andy Webb of The Movie Scene wrote that everything in the film felt like it was "pantomime" while David Parkinson of Radio Times found it was "Scrooge without the ghosts".

== See also ==
- List of Christmas films
- Santa Claus in film
