= Kirsten Prout =

Canadian actress (born 1990)

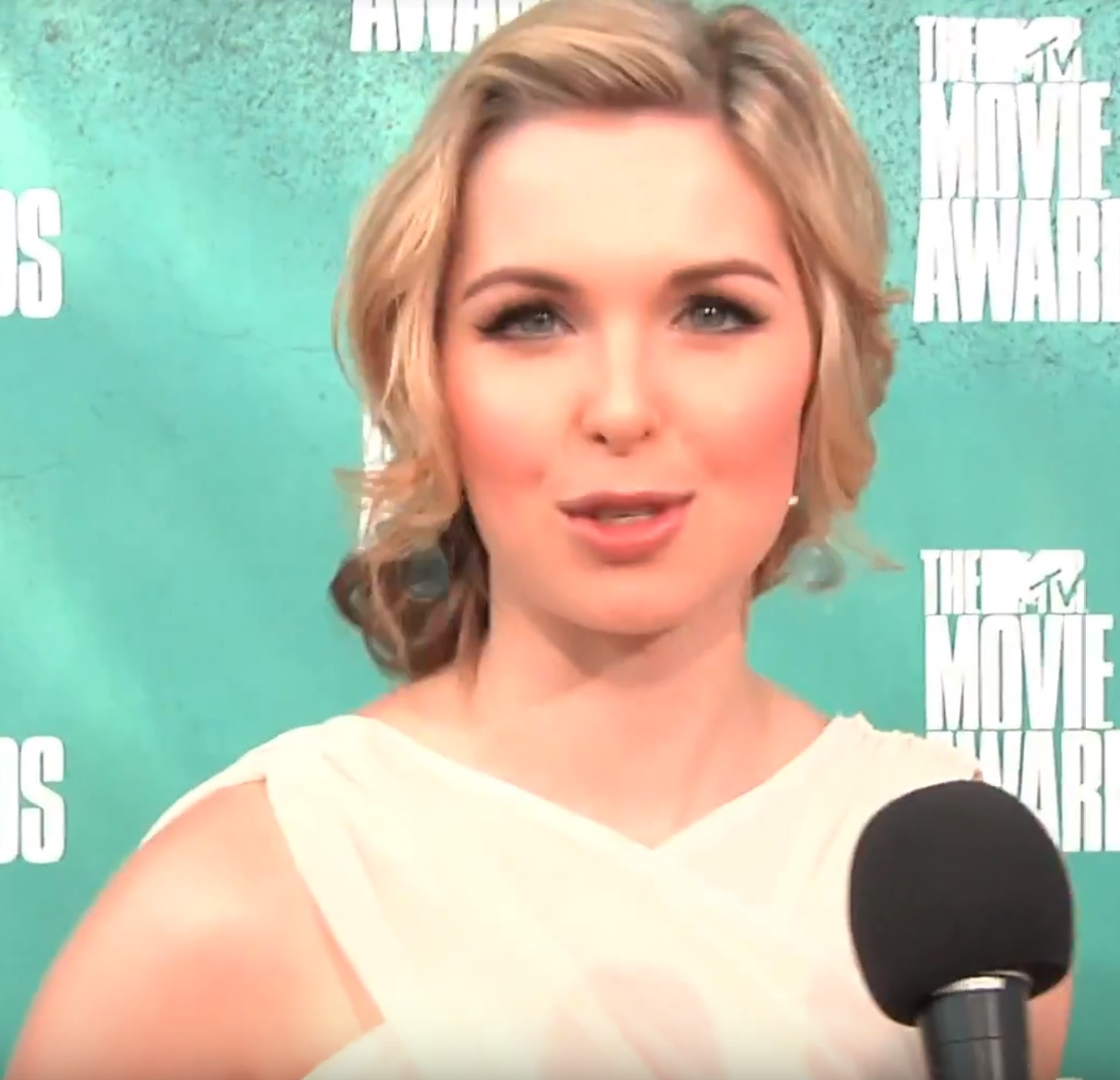
- Prout interviewed at the MTV Movie Awards in 2012
- Born: September 28, 1990 (age 35); Vancouver, British Columbia, Canada
- Other name: Kirsten Zien
- Citizenship: Canada, U.S.
- Occupation: Actress
- Years active: 2000–present
- Spouse: Matt Zien (m. 2017)

Kirsten Prout (born September 28, 1990) is a Canadian-American actress. She is known for her lead roles in the ABC Family television shows, portraying Amanda Bloom in Kyle XY and Char Chamberlin in The Lying Game.

Her first sizable break in film came in 2005, when she was cast as Abby Miller, a lead role opposite Jennifer Garner in Elektra.

In 2007, Prout was nominated for Best Performance in a TV Series by the Young Artists Awards for Kyle XY.

In 2010, Prout portrayed the vampire "Lucy" in The Twilight Saga: Eclipse.

She has guest starred in notable series including NCIS, Psych, Devious Maids, Ties That Bind and Dear White People.

Prout is also known for her lead roles in the horror genre, as Alex Bell in the MTV film series My Super Psycho Sweet 16, Jewel McCaul in Joy Ride 3: Roadkill, and Sloane in the 2015 horror indie Even Lambs Have Teeth.

== Early life ==
Kirsten Prout began her acting career at the age of ten, after being cast in a commercial opposite NHL superstar Wayne Gretzky. Speaking about her desire to start acting, Prout recalled that it was the only way she thought she could turn being a Disney Princess into a career.

An avid martial artist, Kirsten received a Black Belt in Taekwondo at the age of 13. That year, she was cast in Elektra, and performed her own stunts in the film.

Prout graduated high school from Collingwood School in West Vancouver, British Columbia, Canada.

After completing high school and the final season of Kyle XY, Prout attended McGill University, where she majored in English literature. In an interview with The Province, the then 18-year-old Prout said of attending university:

"I grew up on sets where I was treated like I was 25... In university you're in classes with incredibly intelligent people. You realize you're not an expert on everything."

== Career ==
At the age of 13, Prout made her feature film debut in a lead role as Abigail "Abby" Miller in the 2005 film Elektra. The film's Producer Gary Foster said of discovering Prout:

"We did a big search... and frankly LA or New York, we thought we'd find somebody there. She came in and auditioned and we were blown away."

Prout has had lead and guest starring roles in over 40 different film and television productions.

Her most notable lead roles included Amanda Bloom in ABC Family's Kyle XY, Alex Bell in MTV's My Super Psycho Sweet 16 comedy-horror trilogy, and "Char Chamberlin" in ABC Family's The Lying Game. Her most notable guest starring roles included Stargate SG-1, NCIS, Psych, Devious Maids, and Dear White People.

== Personal life ==
On October 13, 2017, Prout announced her engagement to American television development executive Matt Zien; they married on November 6, 2017. She has since become an American citizen.

== Filmography ==
=== Film ===
Year	Title	Role	Notes
2001	Mindstorm	Young Tracy Wellman	
2001	De grot	Julie	Uncredited
2005	Elektra	Abigail "Abby" Miller	
2010	The Twilight Saga: Eclipse	Lucy	
2013	No Clue	Reese	
2014	Joy Ride 3: Roadkill	Jewel McCaul	Direct-to-video film
2015	Even Lambs Have Teeth	Sloane	
2020	Captured	Nicole	Direct-to-video film; filmed in 2012

=== Television ===
Year	Title	Role	Notes
2000	The Linda McCartney Story	Stella	Television film
2000	First Wave	Emily	Episode: "Wednesday's Child"
2000	Once Upon a Christmas	Brittany Morgan	Television film
2001	Mysterious Ways	Lindsay Kasper	Episode: "Wonderful"
2001	Night Visions	Wendy	Episode: "The Doghouse / Still Life"; segment: "Still Life"
2001	The Wedding Dress	Stella Carver	Television film
2001	Twice Upon a Christmas	Brittany Morgan	Television film
2002	Jeremiah	Elayna	Episode: "The Touch"
2002	Beyond Belief: Fact or Fiction	Katie	Episode: "The Doll"
2002	The Dead Zone	Susan Reed	Episode: "Here There Be Monsters"
2003	Stargate SG-1	Nesa	Episode: "Birthright"
2004	The Love Crimes of Gillian Guess	Amanda Guess	Television film
2005	Cold Squad	Ashley	Episode: "The Filth"
2006–2009	Kyle XY	Amanda Bloom	Main role, 39 episodes
2007	Witness to Murder	Samantha Cooper	Television film
2010	Meteor Storm	Kara	Television film
2010	Locked Away	Taylin	Television film
2010	Seven Deadly Sins	Miranda Stevens	Television miniseries
2010	My Super Psycho Sweet 16: Part 2	Alex Bell	Television film
2011–2012	The Lying Game	Charlotte "Char" Chamberlin	Main role, 12 episodes
2012	My Super Psycho Sweet 16: Part 3	Alex Bell	Television film
2012	NCIS	Lydia Wade	Episode: "Gone"
2013	Psych	Zola	Episode: "Cirque du Soul"
2013	Devious Maids	Allison	Episode: "Taking Out the Trash"
2013	Social Nightmare	Catherine Hardy	Television film
2015	My Life as a Dead Girl	Chelsea White	Television film
2015	The Wrong Girl	Michelle Foley	Television film
2015	Ties That Bind	Chelsea Boyd	Episode: "The Whole Picture"
2017	Dear White People	Emily	2 episodes
2017	Woman of the House	Sara Weiss	Television film
2017	The Christmas Train	Julie	Television film

=== Music videos ===
- "Starlight" (2010) by The Framework, as Juliette
