= Kathy Ireland =

American model, actress, and businesswoman (born 1963)

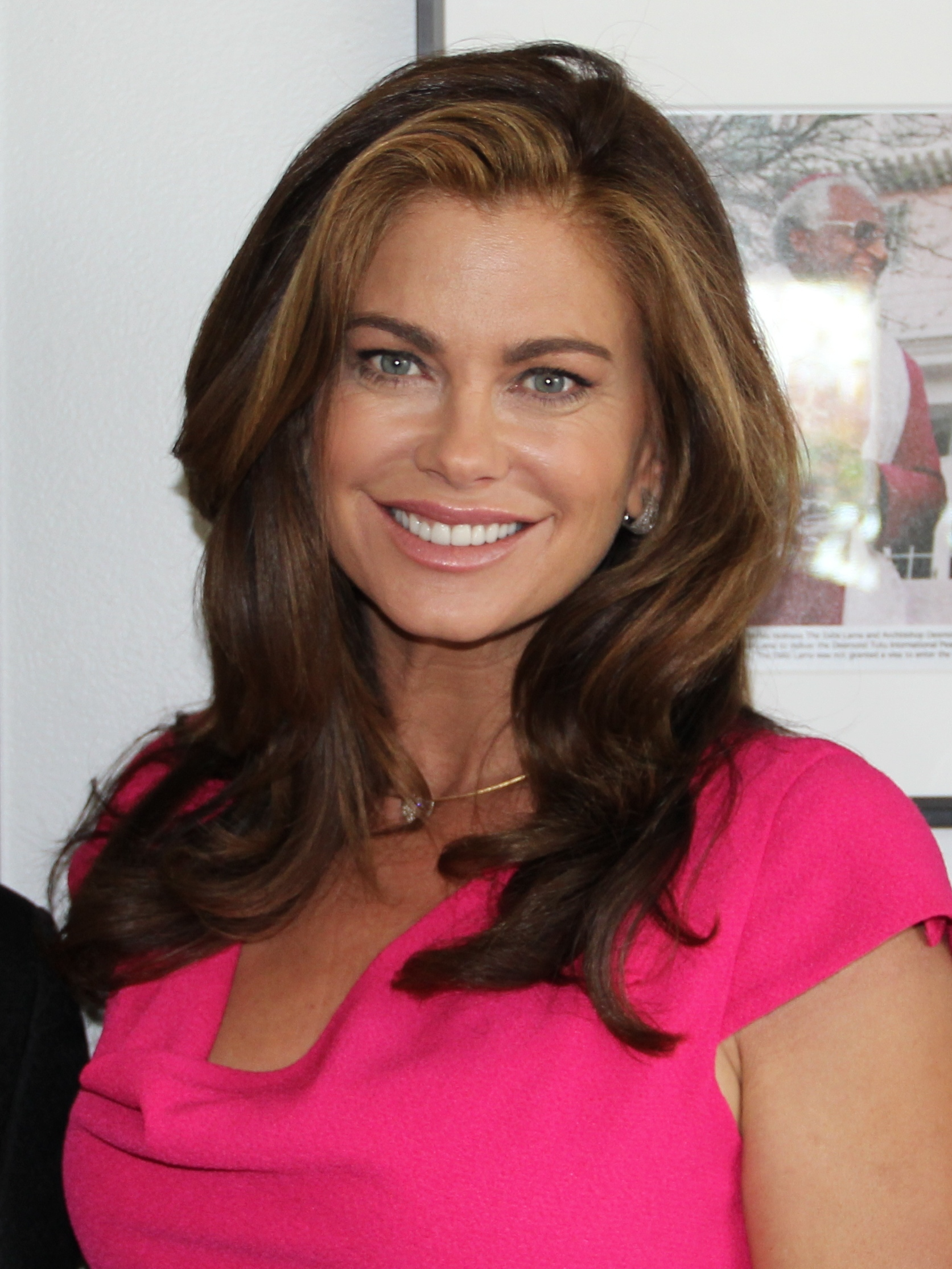
- Ireland in 2012
- Born: Kathleen Marie Ireland; March 20, 1963 (age 63); Glendale, California, U.S.
- Occupations: Model, actress, entrepreneur, businesswoman, author
- Height: 5 ft 10 in (178 cm)
- Spouse: Greg Olsen (m. 1988)
- Children: 3
- Website: www.kathyireland.com

Kathleen Marie Ireland (born March 20, 1963) is an American actress, author, entrepreneur, fashion designer, philanthropist, and former fashion model. Ireland was a supermodel in the 1980s and 1990s, initially known for appearing in 13 consecutive Sports Illustrated swimsuit issues, including three covers. In 1993, she founded a brand licensing company, Kathy Ireland Worldwide (KIWW), which has made her one of the wealthiest former models in the world. As a result of her career in business, she earned a $420 million personal fortune by 2015. In 2021 alone, her company generated retail sales of $3.1 billion. The brand became ranked number 15 in the world and Ireland entered the Licensing Hall of Fame.

== Early life ==
Kathy Ireland was born in Glendale, California, the middle child of three daughters. Ireland's parents are John and Barbara Ireland, a labor relations executive and a nurse respectively. The family moved to Santa Barbara, where they continue to reside today.

== Modeling, film and television career ==
=== Modeling ===
When Ireland was sixteen in 1979, she was scouted at her high school by Elite Model Management.

She has appeared on covers for Vogue, Cosmopolitan, Shape Fitness, Harper's Bazaar, Teen and Seventeen. Forbes, and Mademoiselle.

According to Ireland, a photographer once "crossed the line" with her when she was a teenager and wanted her to pose topless. She did not feel comfortable and he did not respect her "no". He reportedly pushed her and got physical and she "decked him".

During Sports Illustrated swimsuit's 50th Anniversary event, Ireland's 1989 cover was awarded "The Greatest Sports Illustrated Swimsuit Cover Of All Time" by its publisher.

Ireland's successful transformation from a cover girl to a multimillion-dollar entrepreneur has been explicitly cited as inspiring by several active fashion models. After appearing on the cover of Sports Illustrated magazine in 2012, in a subsequent Today show interview, Kate Upton stated that she would like to follow in the footsteps of other cover girls, specifically Heidi Klum and Ireland. Three years later, in an interview with Matt Lauer, Hannah Jeter, the 2015 Sports Illustrated swimsuit cover model, likewise stated that she "would like to model [her] career after someone like Kathy Ireland."

=== Film and television ===
Ireland has appeared in a number of television and film roles. Her first film, 1988's Alien from L.A., was later featured during the fifth season of Mystery Science Theater 3000.

Ireland's other appearances include Melrose Place, Boy Meets World, The Larry Sanders Show, Muppets Tonight, Side Out, Mr. Destiny, Necessary Roughness, Mom and Dad Save the World, National Lampoon's Loaded Weapon 1, Once Upon a Christmas, and its sequel Twice Upon a Christmas.

She also participated in the ninth season of Dancing with the Stars, where Ireland and her partner Tony Dovolani were the third couple eliminated in the second week of competition. Ireland has two TV series, Worldwide Business and Modern Living, which air on Fox Business and Bloomberg.

In 2016, she made an appearance in the sixth episode of the fourth season of The Profit, offering advice for the CEO of Murchison-Hume, Max Kater.

== Entrepreneurship ==
=== Kathy Ireland Worldwide ===
Founded in 1993 as a brand marketing firm in an exclusive business relationship with Kmart, Kathy Ireland Worldwide (or kiWW, for short) became a global licensor after cutting its ties to the department store chain in 2003. In 2019, it stood at No. 26 on License Global's "Top 150 Global Licensors" 2019 list with $2.6 billion in retail sales.

==== 1993–2003 ====
In 1993, after a line of socks bearing Ireland's name sold 100 million pairs, Kmart took notice and gave Ireland her own clothing line.

Buoyed by the initial success, Ireland founded Kathy Ireland Worldwide, at the beginning a brand marketing firm, which she and her related trusts own in its entirety. The company concentrated on building its business in home products after 2003, when it cut its exclusive ties to Kmart.

==== 2003–2013 ====
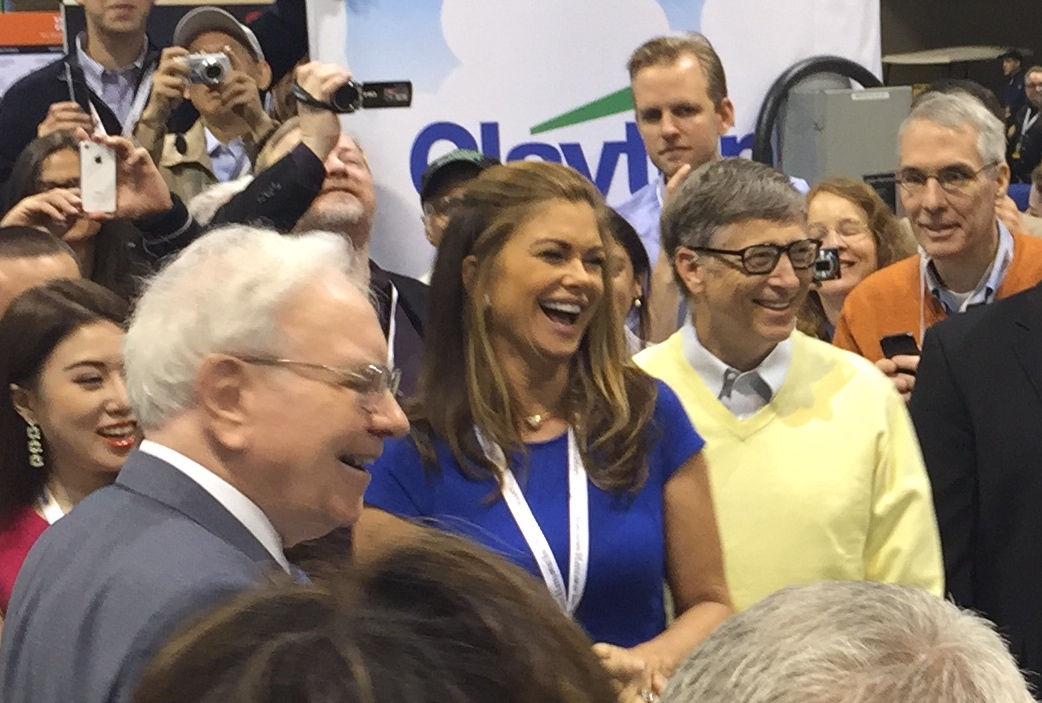
Warren Buffett, Ireland, and Bill Gates at the 2015 Berkshire Hathaway Shareholders Meeting

At the advice of Warren Buffett, Ireland's friend and mentor, Kathy Ireland Worldwide entered into the home furnishings business.

Forbes described Ireland as a "prototype for model-turned-mogul" in a 2006 article about the trend of modelpreneurs. By 2004, Kathy Ireland Worldwide was marketing products from 16 manufacturers—including those of Nourison and Pacific Coast Lighting—selling them in over 34,000 retail locations in as many as 14 countries.

Between 2005 and 2012, products bearing Ireland's brand generated $2 billion in annual retail sales. In a May 2012 British Vogue article, Ireland was called the world's richest model.

Ireland launched her line of wedding gowns by presenting a runway fashion show at the Festival of Brides held in the Disneyland Resort in 2012.

American Legend launched a Kathy Ireland collection in 2011. Ireland is chief designer for Royal Footwear & Accessories (The RFA Group). She has established a relationship with manufacturer Gorham designing dinnerware, glassware and flatware.

Ireland designed collections of jewelry inspired by Elizabeth Taylor. Ireland launched a collection of pet products called Loved Ones. She teamed up with Worldwise Inc., a pet products company based in San Rafael, California, to create the pet collection.

==== 2013–present ====
In 2013, Kathy Ireland Worldwide entered into a licensing agreement with rug manufacturer Nourison, to create a new collection of area rugs.

In 2015, Forbes named Ireland one of America's 50 most successful self-made women (as measured by their net worth) in its first ever list of the kind. Lending her name to several thousands of different products, her company was listed as the 26th biggest licensor in the world in 2019 by License Global.

In 2016, in association with Paul Raps New York, Yaron Turgeman from Taly Diamonds and Roland Krainz from Krainz Creations, Ireland launched "Diamonds by Kathy Ireland", a collection of jewelry pieces. The collection premiered at the 2017 Luxury and JCK shows in Las Vegas.

In January 2017, Ireland teamed with Michael Amini to create a new home-furnishings line. The line debuted in October 2017, at the High Point Market trade show.

Also in January 2017, American Family Insurance tapped Ireland for an ambassador role. To launch their relationship, Ireland was the keynote speaker for their Dream Fearlessly campaign. In July 2018, Fox Business reported that Ireland had ventured into the shipping container business, partnering with SG Blocks, a company which has been designing and constructing container-based buildings and structures in the United States.

On May 8, 2019, singer and actress Vanessa Williams signed a management and partnership agreement with Kathy Ireland Worldwide.

In late 2019, Padlist launched with Ireland as the Chief Editor & Brand Strategist alongside Co-founders Blake Van Leer and Lindsay Van Leer. In 2020, Ireland's company entered into a partnership with Camping World to bring her collections of RV furniture to retail locations and online stores.

In February 2022, Ireland teamed up with Bagatelle for Outerwear, Dresses and Denim

On March 9, 2026, Ireland sued her former business managers in Santa Barbara (CA.) Superior Court for allegedly stealing her multimillion-dollar fortune. The lawsuit claims that her managers, who managed kathy Ireland WorldWide (kiWW) for 30 years left her broke, with no retirement. The lawsuit is pending as of March 2026

=== Other projects ===
==== Record label ====
In April 2021, Marilyn McCoo and Billy Davis Jr. released a new album called Blackbird Lennon-McCartney Icons for the first time in 30 years under Ireland's record label EE1 in partnership with BMG. It was produced by Nic Mendoza. The album hit No 1 on its first day on the iTunes R&B Album chart.

==== Fitness videos ====
Since 1994, Ireland has published several fitness videos that led to her design of athletic apparel and launched her brand licensing of fitness equipment.

==== Writing ====
Ireland has written numerous books, most of them for children. In 2020, Ireland released her first novel Fashion Jungle with author Rachel Van Dyken. The novel is based on events from her career in the modeling industry.

==== Public speaking ====
Ireland spoke at the fourth Youth Assembly at the United Nations Headquarters on August 13, 2007, encouraging young people to engage in activities aimed at ending poverty. She delivered the keynote at Licensing International Expo 2012 in Las Vegas.

Ireland was a key speaker at the 2012 AIPAC policy conference in Washington, D.C. where she expressed her support for the Israeli people and warned against the dangers posed by the lack of knowledge about the history of the land of Israel.

== Philanthropy ==
Ireland's charity work and philanthropic activities have included pro bono work for the non-profit organizations March of Dimes, PTA, Feed the Children and City of Hope.

In addition, Ireland has lent her estates to charitable organizations such as the US Marine Corps' Toys for Tots to generate funds for charity. According to Major Bill Grein of the US Marine Corps, Ireland's company and her book business partner Bendon Publishing International donated $10 million to supplement the 2013 annual Toys for Tots gathering and distribution of Christmas gifts for millions of at-risk children and youths.

On World AIDS Day 2017, Ireland donated $100,000 to the Elizabeth Taylor AIDS Foundation (ETAF).

=== Activism and ambassador roles ===
Ireland is an ambassador for 9-1-1 for Kids, a non-profit organization that specializes in making educational materials to assist emergency dispatchers in teaching children the proper use of 9-1-1 and other general emergency preparedness tips. In an effort to encourage equality in women's athletics, Ireland has hosted several LPGA Golf Tournaments, including the Kathy Ireland Championship from 1999 to 2001 and the Kathy Ireland Greens.com LPGA Classic in 2000. On October 15, 2009, Ireland became an international ambassador for the Friends of Sheba Medical Center. The following year, she traveled to Israel to film a promotional documentary for the center; titled Holy Land Heroes, the film aims to reveal the work done at Sheba with wounded soldiers and terror victims. In 2019, Ireland was added as the first woman to the board of NFL Players Association. Ireland also joined the Women's National Basketball Players Association's (WNBPA) Board of Advocates that same year. Ireland joined the National Pediatric Cancer Foundation in 2020 as International Youth Chair. In March 2022, Ireland launched the National Pediatric Cancer Foundation's "Music Funds the Cure' and joined NPCF's International Youth Chair.

=== Honors and awards ===
On June 23, 2011, Ireland was honored by the Anti-Defamation League with the American Heritage Award, presented by the National Home Furnishings Industry. In 2012, Ireland received the Messenger of Peace Award at the Jewish National Fund Tree of Life Gala. The same year, Ireland was presented with an honorary Doctorate of Humane Letters by the California State University, which stated that she "generously uses her power and influence to benefit others, supporting social causes including empowering women, supporting young girls through mentoring, and providing opportunities for girls and women at risk." Ireland has been nominated as one of 17 finalists for the first Global Business & Interfaith Peace Award given by the Religious Freedom & Business Foundation (an American-based nonprofit), and the United Nations Global Compact Business for Peace initiative. On October 13, 2017, at the "Meet Kathy Ireland Event" hosted by Amini, Ireland was presented with the key to the city of High Point, North Carolina. On July 15, 2021, Ireland was awarded the inaugural Business IRF Champion Award at the IRF Summit in Washington, D.C.

== Personal life ==
Ireland married physician Greg Olsen in 1988, and they have three children: Erik, Lily and Chloe. She is a devout Christian and a pro-life advocate.

=== Friendship with Elizabeth Taylor ===
Elizabeth Taylor and Ireland had a close friendship and attended public events together. After Ireland received outspoken criticism for her uneven performance as an on-air host of ABC's 2010 pre-Oscar special, Taylor publicly defended Ireland; "I have never seen anyone epitomize glamour and grace and professionalism like she did." Ireland publicly credits Taylor as her mentor and for part of her success in life, business, design and philanthropy. Taylor bequeathed her Jean Hersholt Humanitarian Award to Ireland, in addition to leaving her a diamond jewelry collection, which Ireland wore at the 2018 American Heart Association's "Go Red for Women" Dress Show.

== Filmography ==
=== Films ===
Year	Title	Role	Notes
1988	Alien from L.A.	Wanda Saknussemm	The film was featured in an episode of Mystery Science Theater 3000
1989	Journey to the Center of the Earth	Wanda Saknussemm	
1989	Worth Winning	Uncredited	
1990	Side Out	Marie	
1990	Mr. Destiny	Gina	
1991	Necessary Roughness	Lucy Draper	
1992	Mom and Dad Save the World	Semage, Raff's Daughter	
1992	Danger Island	Laura	Television film
1993	Loaded Weapon 1	Destiny Demeanor	
1993	Amore!	Taylor Christopher	
1993	A Perry Mason Mystery: The Case of the Wicked Wives	Dee Morrison	Television film
1994	Beauty and the Bandit	Crystal	Television film
1995	Backfire!	Jessica Luvintryst	
1996	Gridlock	Michele Conner	Television film
1996	Miami Hustle	Marsha Thomas	Television film
2000	Once Upon a Christmas	Kristen Claus	Television film
2001	Twice Upon a Christmas	Kristen Claus	Television film

=== Television ===
Year	Title	Role	Episodes
1985	Charles in Charge	Woman in Line	Episode: "Snowed In"
1990	Grand	Sheila	Episode: "Carnegie Hall"
1992	Tales from the Crypt	Joyce	Episode: "Beauty Rest"
1993	Down the Shore	Rachel	Episode: "Computer Date"
1993	The Larry Sanders Show	Herself	Episode: "The Breakdown: Part 1"
1994	Boy Meets World	Alexis	Episode: "Model Family"
1994	Melrose Place	Brittany Maddocks	4 episodes
1995	The Watcher	Pilot	
1995	Deadly Games	Amber	2 episodes
1995	Eek! the Cat	Andrea Heap (voice)	Main cast
1995–1996	Fantastic Four	Crystal (voice)	4 episodes
1997	Sabrina, the Teenage Witch	Shelley	Episode: "Trial by Fury"
1997	Gun	Episode: "The Shot"	
1997	Muppets Tonight	Herself	Episode: "The Cameo Show"
1997	Suddenly Susan	Terri	2 episodes
1997	Duckman	Susan (voice)	2 episodes
1996–1997	The Incredible Hulk	Ogress (voice)	3 episodes
1998	The Lionhearts	Survive (voice)	
1998	King of the Hill	Sylvia (voice)	Episode: "Peggy's Pageant Fever"
1999	Cosby	Kara	Episode: "He Who Hesitates is Lucas"
1999	Pensacola: Wings of Gold	Sarah	Episode: "Tip of the Spear"
1999	Touched by an Angel	Karla	Episode: "The Last Day of the Rest of Your Life"
2002	Strong Medicine	Amber Hutton	Episode: "Trauma"
2002	For Your Love	Rhonda	Episode: "The Helpless Hand"
2002	Totally Spies!	Julia Hastings (voice)	Episode: "A Spy is Born"
2008	Are You Smarter than a 5th Grader?	Herself	Episode: "301"
