= The People Next Door (American TV series) =

- Genre: Sitcom
- Created by: Wes Craven; Bud Wiggins
- Developed by: Steve Sunshine; Madeline Sunshine
- Written by: Wes Craven; Madeline Sunshine; Steven Sunshine; Bud Wiggins; Bruce Wagne
- Directed by: J.D. Lobue
- Starring: Jaclyn Bernstein; Mary Gross; Jeffrey Jones; Leslie Jordan; Christina Pickles; Chance Quinn; Jackie Swanson
- Opening theme: "The People Next Door" performed by Dr. John
- Composers: Bill Maxwell; Lou Pardini
- Country of origin: United States
- Original language: English
- No. of seasons: 1
- No. of episodes: 10 (5 unaired)

Production
- Executive producers: Wes Craven; Madeline Sunshine; Steve Sunshine
- Producer: Mark Grossan
- Cinematography: Richard Hissong
- Camera setup: Multi-camera
- Running time: 30 minutes
- Production companies: The Sunshines, Inc. Wes Craven Films; Lorimar Television

Original release
- Network: CBS
- Release: September 18 – October 16, 1989

The People Next Door is an American sitcom which aired on CBS from September 18 until October 16, 1989, as part of its Fall 1989 schedule.

== Synopsis ==
Set in Covington, Ohio, The People Next Door starred Jeffrey Jones, previously regarded as a character actor, as cartoonist Walter Kellogg, a man whose imagination was so vivid that many of the things which he imagined materialized immediately. His wife Abigail was portrayed by Mary Gross. They had two children, 14-year-old Matthew and 11-year-old Aurora. Abigail's sister "Cissy" (Christina Pickles) was also a regular, as was meddlesome mailman Truman Fipps (Leslie Jordan).

The series proved to be a ratings disaster, and was cancelled after only five of ten of its produced episodes aired. Early critic reviews called the show "risky" for survival, and the series was the first to be cancelled by CBS in the fall of 1989. When it made its premiere, ratings started off well, but would decline in significant numbers as each week went on, leading to CBS pulling the plug.

== Cast ==
- Jeffrey Jones as Walter Kellogg
- Mary Gross as Abigail MacIntyre Kellogg
- Jaclyn Bernstein as Aurora Kellogg
- Chance Quinn as Matthew Kellogg
- Leslie Jordan as Truman Fipps
- Christina Pickles as Cissy MacIntyre

== Episodes ==
No.	Title	Directed by	Written by	Original release date
1	"I Do, I Do"	J.D. Lobue	Story by : Wes Craven & Bud Wiggins and Madeline Sunshine & Steven Sunshine; Teleplay by : Madeline Sunshine & Steven H. Sunshine	September 18, 1989
2	"Town Without Pity"	J.D. Lobue	Madeline Sunshine & Steve Sunshine	September 25, 1989
3	"Dream Date"	J.D. Lobue	Lee Aronsohn	October 2, 1989
4	"You Show Me Yours..."	J.D. Loube	Mark Masuoka	October 9, 1989
5	"Happy Birthday, Baby"	J.D. Loube	Bob Tischler	October 16, 1989
6	"Halloween"	N/A	N/A	Unaired
7	"Make Room for Abby"	N/A	N/A	Unaired
8	"Jealousy Story"	N/A	N/A	Unaired
9	"House and Home"	N/A	N/A	Unaired
10	"No ZZZ's"	N/A	N/A	Unaired
