= Journey to the Center of the Earth (1989 film) =

1989 American science fiction film by Albert Pyun, Rusty Lemorande

- Directed by: Rusty Lemorande; Albert Pyun (uncredited)
- Written by: Debra Ricci; Regina Davis; Kitty Chalmers; Rusty Lemorande
- Based on: Journey to the Center of the Earth; 1864 novel by Jules Verne
- Produced by: Yoram Globus; Menahem Golan
- Starring: Nicola Cowper; Paul Carafotes; Jaclyn Bernstein; Janet Du Plessis; Emo Philips; Kathy Ireland
- Cinematography: Tom Fraser; David Watkin
- Edited by: Victor Livingston; Rozanne Zingale
- Music by: Stephane Lee; Tim Stonewall
- Distributed by: The Cannon Group
- Release date: June 9, 1989
- Running time: 79 minutes
- Country: United States
- Language: English

Journey to the Center of the Earth is an American 1989 fantasy film directed by Rusty Lemorande and starring Nicola Cowper and Paul Carafotes. It was a nominal sequel to the 1988 film Alien from L.A., both of which are very loosely based on the 1864 novel Journey to the Center of the Earth by Jules Verne.

== Plot summary ==
Newly hired nanny Crystina arrives in Hawaii to discover that her charge is the dog of Nimrod, a rock star. Two brothers accidentally take the dog's basket to a local cave with their sister, and Crystina catches up to them in a taxi. The group gets lost in a cavern while exploring a volcano. The volcano erupts, and the cave begins to collapse. The sister escapes to get help while the others explore the cave system trying to find a way out. While exploring, Bryan, Bernard, and Crystina each discover the lost city of Atlantis, at the center of the Earth.

Atlantis is inhabited, and view the arrival of the group, along with a separate visitor from the surface, Wanda Saknussemm, as an invasion by General Rykov. This leads the Atlanteans to prepare to invade the surface.

Bryan & Bernard are found by an Atlantean scavenger named Shank. She offers her help in getting him back to the surface as long as he agrees to take her with him. Crystina wanders around a junkyard where she's discovered and captured by General Rykov. Elsewhere, Richard is saved from the caves by the National Guard.

In a warehouse, Crystina is escorted through the facility by Lieutenant Tola who informs her of Rykov's invasion plans. Shank discovered Crystina was captured and informs Bryan of her whereabouts.

Crystina's kindness, and stories of the surface, change the minds of the Atlanteans there. General Rykov confronts Tola and demands his execution. Bryan & Shank break into the warehouse to save Crystina. Bryan attacks the guards while Shank plays rock music to incapacitate everyone there. Rykov screams, and the screen turns white.

A white house covered in snow is shown an undisclosed time later. Inside Bryan relaxes in a chair reading his comic books. A news bulletin comes onto the television announcing the new Lord-elect of Atlantis, Consul Tritan Crassis. Tritan announces Atlantis comes in peace wishing to explore trade and tourism between worlds. He further announces the surfaces new ambassador, Wanda Saknussemm, while Atlantis' ambassadors shall be newlyweds Tola and Crystina. The camera pans up from Bryan to show a laughing Shank eating popcorn.

== Cast ==
- Emo Philips as Nimrod
- Paul Carafotes as Richard
- Jaclyn Bernstein as Sara
- Kathy Ireland as Wanda Saknussemm
- Janie du Plessis as Gen. Rykov / Shank
- Nicola Cowper as Crystina
- Lochner De Kock as Professor Galba
- Ilan Mitchell-Smith as Bryan
- Albert Maritz as Mago/Kepple/lab assistant
- Jeff Celentano as Tola
- Simon Poland as Roderman / hairdresser
- Jeremy Crutchley as Billy Foul

== Production ==
The film marked the directorial debut of Rusty Lemorande and began shooting in June 1986 over the course of 40 days in Newport Beach, California with various underground scenes constructed within a vacant hangar at Long Beach Naval Shipyard.

After screening Lemorande's rough cut, producers Yoram Globus and Menahem Golan were dissatisfied with the results particularly with the lack of a beginning which had been shot with Christmas decorations but had to be scrapped when the film abandoned its intended Holiday 1986 release date. Lemorande had hoped the screening would convince Globus and Golan to allocate additional resources to finish the film, but instead they hired Albert Pyun to complete the film. Pyun accepted the job saying he would finish the film for free if they allowed him to film Alien from L.A. for under $1 million which was a repurposed version of Pyun's own take on Journey to the Center of the Earth, which they agreed.

== Reception ==
Moria called the film "an entirely incoherent hodgepodge".

Creature Feature gave the movie 1 out of 5 stars, calling the film a mess and something that only vaguely resembles a feature film.

Common Sense Media stated that the film's "plot is absurd and at times hard to follow, the acting is bad, and the film overall looks very low-budget" but that it was appropriate for most children.
