= Joy Ride 3: Roadkill =

- Official DVD cover
- Directed by: Declan O'Brien
- Written by: Declan O'Brien
- Based on: Characters by J. J. Abrams; Clay Tarver
- Produced by: Kim Todd
- Starring: Ken Kirzinger; Jesse Hutch; Kirsten Prout; Leela Savasta; Ben Hollingsworth; Gianpaolo Venuta; Dean Armstrong
- Cinematography: Michael Marshall
- Edited by: Michael Trent
- Music by: Claude Foisy
- Production company: Regency Enterprises
- Distributed by: 20th Century Fox Home Entertainment
- Release date: June 3, 2014
- Running time: 96 minutes
- Country: United States
- Language: English
- Budget: $2 million

Joy Ride 3: Roadkill (Note: Titled onscreen as Joy Ride 3) is a 2014 American Direct-to-video horror film written and directed by Declan O'Brien and stars Ken Kirzinger, Jesse Hutch, Kirsten Prout, Ben Hollingsworth and Dean Armstrong. It is a sequel to Joy Ride (2001) and Joy Ride 2: Dead Ahead (2008) and the third and final installment of the Joy Ride series.

The film was released digitally and on DVD in June 2014.

== Plot ==
Rob and Candy are holed up in a motel room, using methamphetine and having sex. When they run out of drugs, Rob convinces Candy to use the CB to lure a trucker to their room, so they can rob him. Rusty Nail responds to Candy's summons. When Rob answers the door, Rusty realizes he's been tricked and takes the pair captive. Rob and Candy are chained to each other and the axle of Rusty Nail's truck. He takes them to a deserted stretch of Highway 17 and tells them he will let them go if they can hang onto the hood of the truck for a mile. If one of them falls, the other will be pulled off the truck by the chain, and both will die under the truck. He tapes a bag of meth to the windshield of his truck, telling them they can have the drugs after they make it. After riding awhile, Rob calls out that they have ridden for at least a mile, and Rusty Nail agrees. Thinking they have made it, Candy reaches for the bag of drugs; her chain is pulled into the axle, and she and Rob are both pulled underneath the still-moving truck and killed. Later, the authorities are called to the scene; Officer Williams, a newly appointed deputy, wants to investigate further, but is encouraged by Officer Jenkins to make it an open-and-shut case.

Racecar drivers Jordon and Austin, along with their team—Jewel (Jordon's girlfriend), Mickey, Alisa and Bobby — are headed on trip to Canada so that they can compete in the Road Rally 1000. Whilst stopping for lunch, Austin discovers an unpatrolled highway on a map that he realises could shorten their journey by a day, but are warned against taking the route by a creepy old trucker named Barry, for directions, he warns them against taking 17; he tells them it's called "Slaughter Alley" (which the cops at the scene of Rob and Candy's deaths also claimed), and tells them the story of Rusty Nail, who has become something of an urban legend. Jenkins stops in for a cup of coffee and denies Barry's claims, encouraging them to take 17. Barry tells them that stretch of highway is unpatrolled, which appeals to Austin, who wants to be able to test the limits of their car on open road, so they agree to go that way. Nevertheless, the group decides to take the route anyway.

During the journey, Austin's friends begin jokingly teasing him about a crash he had once gotten in. Austin gets upset, however, and vents his frustrations by messing with another truck driver (who happens to be Rusty Nail) before speeding off. Later, however, Rusty Nail catches up to the group and starts messing with them himself. Eventually, Rusty deliberately rams into a flatbed trailer which the group had been using to carry their racecar, causing it to detach from their SUV and run off the road with Mickey and Bobby inside. Rusty then tailgates Jordon, who dodges to get out of the way of an oncoming station wagon; when Rusty tries to do the same, he jackknifes, and Austin and co. are seemingly able to get away. However, Rusty then checks a camera he has mounted to the front of the truck, identifying Jordon's license number, and later uses an CB radio to hail Jordon and co., vowing revenge.

That night, Jewel and Austin offer to head to the police station to report the incident. During their trip, however, Rusty Nail catches up to Jewel and Austin, and quickly runs them off the road before putting their unconscious bodies in the back of his truck.

Rusty takes Jewel and Austin to a deserted field, where he kills Austin by putting his hands and shoving his face into an engine fan. He then calls Jordon over a walkie-talkie (which the group had been using to communicate with each other between the vehicles). Rusty tells Jordon that he'll give Jewel back if he and the others hand over the racecar, and instructs Jordon to meet up with him at an old warehouse in an hour.

Jordon, Mickey, Alisa, and Bobby arrive at the warehouse and split up looking for Rusty. Suddenly, Rusty appears and kidnaps Bobby before fleeing in his truck. The rest of the group pursue him in the racecar, only stopping when they come across a police car on the side of the road. The officer driving the car agrees to help them out, only for Rusty to abruptly plow through his car, killing him.

Jordon, Mickey, and Alisa get back to trying to follow Rusty. During the journey, Rusty pulls over and contacts Jordon, where he taunts him by killing Bobby as the group listens helplessly over the radio. Rusty then tells Jordon to meet him at a junkyard and give himself up; only then will he set Jewel and Austin free. Mickey tries to convince Jordon and Alisa to get help from law enforcement, and makes Jordon pull over, but they both refuse his offer, and Mickey thus decides to go look for help himself on foot. Mickey finds Rusty's truck on the side of road; he finds the truck parked on a side road, and is overpowered by Rusty Nail. Rusty crushes Mickey's head in a wench, then lights the semi-trailer of his truck on fire, driving off in just the tractor unit.

Jordon sends Alisa to go get help and enters the junkyard alone to confront Rusty Nail. The two fight, as Rusty indicates Jewel is trapped in a dangling car about to be crushed. Just as it seems Rusty has the upper hand, Alisa runs him over with the racecar, and she and Jordon go to rescue Jewel. When they get to the car, however, Jordon realises that the source of Jewel's apparent "screaming" was coming from a video camera in the trunk playing pre-recorded footage. As they watch helplessly, Jewel (tied to the roof of Rusty's truck) is killed when Rusty drives her into a steel bridge girder, killing her.

Enraged, Jordon and Alisa get in the car to go find Rusty Nail, but he rams into them, trying to crush them. Jordon manages to escape the car and runs to a nearby wrecking claw, using it to put Rusty's truck into the crusher, with Rusty inside. Later, however, when Williams and his men investigate, Rusty Nail is nowhere to be found. The film ends with Rusty Nail hitching a ride with another truck driver.

== Cast ==
- Ken Kirzinger as Rusty Nail
- Jesse Hutch as Jordon Wells
- Kirsten Prout as Jewel McCaul
- Benjamin Hollingsworth as Mickey Cole
- Leela Savasta as Alisa Rosado
- Gianpaolo Venuta as Austin Morris (Note: In the film, Austin Morris is identified correctly when Rusty Nail finds the group in a laptop, but in the film's end credits his last name is listed as "Austin Moore".)
- Jake Manley as Bobby Crow
- Sara Mitich as Candy
- J. Adam Brown as Rob
- Dean Armstrong as Officer Williams
- James Durham as Officer Jenkins
- David Ferry as Barry

== Release ==
The film was released straight to DVD and Blu-ray on June 17, 2014. The film has grossed over $1.287 million in home video sales.
