= John Dye (actor) =

American actor (1963–2011)

- Born: John Carroll Dye; January 31, 1963; Amory, Mississippi, U.S.
- Died: January 10, 2011 (aged 47); San Francisco, California, U.S.
- Resting place: Haughton Memorial Park, Amory, Mississippi, U.S.
- Occupation: Actor
- Years active: 1984–2007

John Carroll Dye (January 31, 1963 – January 10, 2011) was an American film and television actor known for his role as Andrew in the spiritual television drama series Touched by an Angel.

== Early life ==
Dye was born in Amory, Mississippi, one of four sons of Jim and Lynn Dye, a furniture manufacturer and homemaker, respectively, who raised their sons in the Methodist denomination. The family moved to Cleveland, Tennessee, where he attended Cleveland High School, and later to Tupelo, Mississippi. He was introduced to acting by playing the role of Friedrich, the eldest male von Trapp child in a school production of The Sound of Music at Cleveland High School. He graduated from Tupelo High School, where he again played Friedrich von Trapp. Dye found himself bitten by the acting bug. After graduating, he enrolled at Mississippi State University in hopes of becoming a civil rights lawyer. After a year at Mississippi State University, he decided to become an actor, and was advised against it by his great-grandmother. He transferred to Memphis State University and majored in theater.

== Career ==
In Memphis, Dye discovered that a Judd Nelson film called Making the Grade (1984) was filming in the area. Dye landed his first film role as "Skip". In the 1985 music video for the ZZ Top song "Sleeping Bag", he appeared alongside fellow actors Tracey Walter and Heather Langenkamp. In 1986 he starred alongside actresses Virginia Madsen and Cynthia Gibb in the comedy film Modern Girls. In 1987 Dye got his first leading role, in the film Campus Man, as Todd Barrett. That same year, he re-teamed with Nelson in the television miniseries Billionaire Boys Club. In 1989, he starred alongside actors James Earl Jones and Eric Roberts in the martial-arts drama Best of the Best.

Dye began appearing on television in 1987. He was cast in 1989 as Private Francis "Doc Hock" Hockenbury for the last season of Tour of Duty. When the series finished, he moved on to short-lived series such as Jack's Place (1992) and Hotel Malibu (1994). In 1996, he appeared as Andrew the "Angel of Death" on Touched by an Angel with Roma Downey & Della Reese. Originally cast as a recurring character, by the third season, he was made a regular cast member as his character quickly became popular. The show ran for nine seasons before ending in April 2003. In 2000, he starred in the television movie Once Upon a Christmas and the following year, he appeared in the sequel Twice Upon a Christmas. Also in 2000, he starred in the documentary, Journey to a Hate Free Millennium.

== Death ==
Dye was found dead in his home in San Francisco on January 10, 2011, three weeks before his 48th birthday. No cause of death was initially determined, but a death certificate issued in May 2011 concluded that he died from accidental "acute methamphetamine intoxication".

== Filmography ==
Film roles
Year	Title	Role	Notes
1984	Making the Grade	Skip	
1986	Modern Girls	Hunk	
1987	Campus Man	Todd Barrett	
1989	Best of the Best	Virgil Keller	
1991	The Perfect Weapon	Det. Adam Sanders	
1994	Sioux City	Colin Adams	
2005	Heart of the Beholder	D.A. Eric Manion	
2007	Fist of the Warrior	I.A. Officer	Alternate title: Lesser of Three Evils

Television roles
Year	Title	Role	Notes
1987	Billionaire Boys Club	Bob Holmby	Television film (NBC)
1988	CBS Summer Playhouse	Mr. Biscuit	Episode: "Old Money"
1988	Murder, She Wrote	Andy Broom	Episode: "A Little Night Work"
1989–1990	Tour of Duty	Pvt. Francis 'Doc Hoc' Hockenberry	Main role (season 3)
1990	Room for Romance	Craig Holloway	Episode: "Pilot"
1992–1993	Jack's Place	Greg Toback	Recurring role
1994	Murder, She Wrote	Dr. Ray Stinson	Episode: "A Nest of Vipers"
1994	Hotel Malibu	Jack Mayfield	Main role
1996–2003	Touched by an Angel	Andrew	Main role
1996	The Nerd	Rick Steadman	Episode: Pilot
1996–1998	Promised Land	Andrew	4 episodes
2000	Once Upon a Christmas	Bill Morgan	Television film (PAX-TV)
2001	Twice Upon a Christmas	Bill Morgan	Television film (PAX-TV)
