= Jaclyn Bernstein =

American actress and writer

- Born: August 15, 1978 (age 48); Los Angeles, California, U.S.
- Occupations: Writer, poet, actress
- Years active: 1981–1994
- Awards: Young Artist Award (1987, 1989)

Jaclyn Bernstein (born August 15, 1978) is an American writer and poet. Her work has been published in the Brattle Street Review.

She gained prominence in the 1980s as a child actress, with roles on The Golden Girls, Family Ties, 227, Highway to Heaven, For Keeps? and The Rain Children, a Pacific Bell mini-series of advertising campaign commercials featured in Dumb and Dumber.

== Acting career ==
She began working at age three and appeared in over 100 commercials as a child. Bernstein made her television debut in St. Elsewhere followed by an episode of The Twilight Zone. As a child performer she worked with Jerry Lewis, Morgan Freeman, Patty Duke, Nell Carter, Michael J. Fox, Raquel Welch, Marion Ross, Denzel Washington, Howie Mandel, Cindy William, Lesley Ann Warren, Michael Landon, Molly Ringwald, David Steinberg, Wes Craven, Gary David Goldberg, Christina Pickles, and Conchata Ferrell. She won a Young Artist Award in 1987 for her role in A Fight For Jenny.

== Filmography ==
=== Writing Credits ===
Year	Title	Notes
2019	Frontline of Humanity	Writer

=== Film ===
Year	Title	Role	Notes
1986	Poltergeist II: The Other Side	Young Diane	
1988	For Keeps	Mary Bobrucz	
1988	Journey to the Center of the Earth	Sara	
1993	Family Prayers	Julie	
1994	Dumb and Dumber	Lucy	
2017	The Stork	Terri	

=== Television ===
Year	Title	Role	Notes
1985	St. Elsewhere	Betty	Episode: "Cheers"
1985, 1986	The Twilight Zone	Megan McDowell / Debbie Cunningham	2 episodes
1986	Highway to Heaven	Myra	Episode: "Heaven on Earth"
1986	A Fight for Jenny	Jennifer Wilkes	Television film
1986	Webster	Cindy / Trick or Treater	2 episodes
1986	Fame	The Older Youngster	Episode: "All I Want for Christmas"
1987	Fight for Life	Felice Abrams	Television film
1987	CBS Summer Playhouse	Denise	Episode: "The Time of Their Lives"
1987	Right to Die	Lynn	Television film
1987	Werewolf	Anna	Episode: "All Hallow's Eve"
1987	The Golden Girls	Linda	Episode: "Letter to Gorbachev"
1988	Buck James	Melinda Brannigan	Episode: "To Everything a Season"
1988	Police Story: Burnout	Christina	Television film
1988	A Very Brady Christmas	Jessica Logan	Television film
1989	227	Emily	Episode: "Babes in the Woods"
1989	Family Ties	Marla	Episode: "Simon Says"
1989	The People Next Door	Aurora Kellogg	10 episodes
1990	The Bradys	Jessica Logan	4 episodes
1990, 1991	Empty Nest	Nancy / Amanda	2 episodes
1991	You Take the Kids	—N/a	Episode: "Bad Boy"
1991	The Fresh Prince of Bel-Air	Girl at Party	Episode: "Just Infatuation"
1991	Coconut Downs	Sara Van Buren	Television film
1991	Brooklyn Bridge	Student	Episode: "War of the Worlds"
1992	Step by Step	Patty	Episode: "The Boys in the Band"
1993	Blossom	Elizabeth	Episode: "Blossom in Paris: Part 1"
