= Twice Upon a Christmas =

2001 TV film by Tibor Takács

- DVD cover
- Written by: Steven H. Berman
- Directed by: Tibor Takács
- Starring: Kathy Ireland; John Dye; Matthew Walker; Mary Donnelly Haskell; Rebecca Toolan; Kirsten Prout; James Kirk
- Music by: Alex Khaskin; Guy Zerafa
- Countries of origin: Canada; United States
- Original language: English

Production
- Producers: Jon Carrasco; Deboragh Gabler; Stephen Roseberry; Prince Edward, Earl of Wessex
- Cinematography: Ron Orieux
- Editor: Ellen Fine
- Running time: 90 minutes
- Production company: Paramount Television

Original release
- Release: December 8, 2001

Twice Upon a Christmas is a 2001 film directed by Tibor Takács. A sequel to the 2000 PAX television film, Once Upon a Christmas, it stars most of the original cast from the first film. The filming location was in Vancouver, British Columbia.

The film is also known as Rudolpha's Revenge.

== Plot ==
After Kristin saved Kyle's life, she has been living with the Morgan family ever since. Unfortunately, she cannot remember her past, and has lost her immortality. Bill proposes to her, but she declines, as she says she doesn't feel right about the decision without knowing her family.

At the North Pole, Rudolpha is secretly selling pieces of the North Pole worldwide to get rid of the North Pole, and to make Santa Claus feel that he is being replaced. As Kristin is preparing her wedding with Bill, Brittany and Kyle, Bill's two children, order from Rudolpha's business, and unknowingly receive Kristin's doll from when she was a little girl. After Kristin sees the doll, she immediately remembers her past, as flashbacks are shown of her life until then (with many using footage from Once Upon a Christmas).

After Kristin sees Rudolpha's commercial, she and the children discover Rudolpha's plan, and head for the North Pole to try to save Christmas. With a special announcement the pieces are returned and Christmas saved. Rudolpha must ride since the deer have not come back. Kristen and Bill get married.

== Cast ==
| Actor | Role |
|---|---|
| Kathy Ireland | Kristin Claus |
| John Dye | Bill Morgan |
| Matthew Walker | Santa Claus |
| Mary Donnelly Haskell | Rudolpha Claus |
| Wayne Thomas Yorke | Uncle Johnny |
| Robin Avery | Sandman |
| Rebecca Toolan | Clara Claus |
| Kirsten Prout | Brittany Morgan |
| James Kirk | Kyle Morgan |
| Arturo Gil | Wahoo |
| Rachelle Carson | Harley Jones |
| Liz Torres | The Tooth Fairy |
| Sean Allan | Donald Trump |

== Home media ==
CBS Home Entertainment through Paramount Home Entertainment released the film on DVD November 7, 2006.

== See also ==
- List of Christmas films
- Santa Claus in film
