= Cyborg (film) =

1989 film by Albert Pyun

- Theatrical release poster
- Directed by: Albert Pyun
- Written by: Albert Pyun; Daniel Hubbard-Smith
- Produced by: Menahem Golan; Yoram Globus
- Starring: Jean-Claude Van Damme; Deborah Richter; Vincent Klyn; Dayle Haddon
- Cinematography: Philip Alan Waters
- Edited by: Scott Stevenson; Rozanne Zingale
- Music by: Kevin Bassinson
- Production company: The Cannon Group
- Distributed by: The Cannon Group
- Release date: April 7, 1989
- Running time: 82 minutes
- Country: United States
- Language: English
- Budget: <$500,000
- Box office: $9.5–10.2 million

Cyborg (Note: Also known as Slinger; rereleased in the Philippines as First Hero) is a 1989 American martial-arts cyberpunk film directed by Albert Pyun. Jean-Claude Van Damme stars as Gibson Rickenbacker, a mercenary who battles a group of murderous marauders led by Fender Tremolo (Vincent Klyn) along the East coast of the United States in a post-apocalyptic future. It is the first installment in the Cyborg film series and it was followed by the sequels Cyborg 2 (1993) and Cyborg 3: The Recycler (1994).

== Plot ==
A plague known as the living death cripples civilization. A small group of surviving scientists and doctors — located in Atlanta, home of the CDC — work on a cure to save what remains of humanity. To complete their work they need information stored on a computer system in New York City. Pearl Prophet volunteers for the dangerous courier mission and is made into a cyborg through surgical augmentation.

Pearl, accompanied by bodyguard Marshall Strat, retrieves the data in New York but is pursued by the vicious Fender Tremolo and his gang of pirates. Fender wants the cure so he can have a monopoly on its production. Strat, badly injured while fighting the pirates, tells Pearl to leave him and find a mercenary, known as a "slinger", who can escort her to safety. She gets cornered but is saved by a slinger named Gibson Rickenbacker. After she explains her situation, they are overrun by Fender's gang, and Gibson is knocked out by falling debris. Fender demands that she accompany him to Atlanta or die.

Fender's gang slaughters a family and steals their boat. They head south for Atlanta via the Intracoastal Waterway with the captive Pearl. Gibson, who had been tracking the pirates, arrives at the scene of slaughter later that night. A shadowy figure attacks him, but he disables her. She turns out to be Nady Simmons, a young woman who mistook him as a pirate. Nady, whose family was wiped out by the plague, joins Gibson. Gibson is less concerned with a cure for the plague than with killing Fender. Gibson and Nady trek southward through the wastelands, where bandits ambush them. Concerned for Nady, Gibson unsuccessfully attempts to convince her to stay away. After declining sex with Nady, Gibson reveals that all he cares about is revenge against Fender, who killed his lover and destroyed his chance to have a normal life and family.

Intercepting Fender and his crew near Charleston, South Carolina, Gibson defeats most of his men, but Fender shoots him with an air rifle. Now nursing a gunshot wound, Gibson realizes Haley (his dead lover's younger sister whom Fender kidnapped) is now a loyal member of Fender's crew. He flees the pirates and ends up alone with Pearl and Nady. Pearl refuses to go with him — she calculates that Gibson is not strong enough to defeat Fender and will be unable to get her to Atlanta safely. She says she will go along with Fender and lure him to his death in Atlanta, where she has resources at her disposal.

Tired, wounded and badly outnumbered, Gibson flees with Nady through the sewer into a salt marsh, where they are pursued by the rest of the pirates and eventually separated from each other. Gibson is thoroughly beaten by Fender and crucified high on the mast of a beached, derelict ship. Haley lingers at the scene but still leaves with Fender. Gibson spends the night on the cross. In the morning, near death, he kicks the mast repeatedly with his dangling foot in a last fit of rage. The mast snaps, sending him crashing to the ground, his arms still tied and nailed to the cross. Finally, Nady appears out of the marsh to free him.

Gibson and Nady intercept Fender once again in Atlanta, this time better prepared. Fender's gang is taken down one by one until he and Gibson face off. During their fight, Nady rushes Fender with a knife, but he stabs and kills her. Gibson in turn stabs Fender in the chest. Thinking him dead, Gibson embraces Haley, who, during the battle turned decisively against Fender. However, Fender gets back up, and they continue to battle in a nearby shed, where Gibson finally kills Fender by impaling him on a meat hook. Gibson and Haley escort Pearl to her final destination before heading back.

== Cast ==
- Jean-Claude Van Damme as Gibson Rickenbacker
- Deborah Richter as Nady Simmons
- Vincent Klyn as Fender Tremolo
- Dayle Haddon as Pearl Prophet
- Alex Daniels as Marshall Strat
- Blaise Loong as Furman Vux / Pirate / Bandit
- Ralf Möller as Brick Bardo (credited as Rolf Muller)
- Haley Peterson as Haley
- Terrie Batson as Mary
- Jackson 'Rock' Pinckney as Tytus / Pirate
- Michel Qissi Fight trainer

== Production ==
Cannon Films initially intended to make a sequel to the 1987 He-Man film Masters of the Universe and a live-action Spider-Man film. Both projects were planned to be shot simultaneously by Albert Pyun. Cannon, however, was in financial trouble and had to cancel deals with both Mattel and Marvel Entertainment Group, the owners of He-Man and Spider-Man, respectively. Cannon had already spent $2 million on costumes and sets for both films and decided to start a new project in order to recoup that money. Pyun wrote the storyline for Cyborg in one weekend. Pyun had Chuck Norris in mind for the lead, but co-producer Menahem Golan cast Jean-Claude Van Damme. The film was shot for less than $500,000 and was filmed in 23 days. The film was shot entirely in Wilmington, North Carolina.

Several of the characters' names are references to well-known manufacturers and models of guitars and other musical instruments:

- Gibson Rickenbacker: Gibson, Rickenbacker
- Fender Tremolo: Fender, Tremolo arm
- Marshall Strat: Marshall Amplifiers, Fender Stratocaster
- Les: Gibson Les Paul
- Pearl Prophet: Pearl drums, Prophet 5 synthesizer
- Nady Simmons: Nady Systems, Inc. and Simmons electric drums

After the success of Bloodsport, Cannon films offered Van Damme the lead in Delta Force 2: The Colombian Connection, American Ninja 3: Blood Hunt or Cyborg. He chose the latter although he later admitted that he did not like the film very much.

Jackson "Rock" Pinckney, who played one of Fender's pirates, lost an eye during filming when Van Damme accidentally struck his eye with a prop knife. Pinckney sued Van Damme in a North Carolina court and was awarded $485,000.

Violent scenes were heavily cut to gain an R rating rather than an X, including a throat-slitting and some blood and gore during the village massacre. Also excised was the death of a man Van Damme was fighting, which caused an inconsistency that made him look like he suddenly disappeared.

== Release ==
=== Theatrical ===
Cyborg was released in the United States on April 7, 1989. In the Philippines, the film was rereleased as First Hero on August 16, 1995, with "Re Issue" written in small print within the credits of the poster.

=== Director's Cut ===
In 2011, director Albert Pyun's Curnan Pictures got hold of the missing tapes of the original cut of Cyborg through Pyun's original choice for score artist, Tony Riparetti. This director's cut of the film features Pyun's editing and previously unreleased scenes, as well as the original score by Tony Riparetti and Jim Saad. It is commercially available through the director himself. Pyun's director's cut was released in 2014 in Germany with the film's original title "Slinger".

== Reception ==
=== Box office ===
The film debuted at number four at the American box office and went on to gross $10,166,459.

=== Critical response ===
Cyborg received a generally negative reception from critics despite the box office success. Review aggregator Rotten Tomatoes reports a 22% positive score based on 18 reviews and an average rating of 3.5/10. On Metacritic the film has a weighted average score of 24 out of 100, based on 8 critics, indicating "generally unfavorable" reviews.

== Sequels ==
Cyborg 2, starring Elias Koteas and Angelina Jolie, was released in 1993. Cyborg 3: The Recycler, a direct-to-video release, followed in 1995. Both films bear little to no relation to the first film and were heavily panned by critics, even more than the original.

== Comic book ==
To coincide with the film's home video release, Cannon published a one-shot comic book. The story's narration largely follows the plot of the film, although the final fight ends on a cliffhanger. As it was credited to author Noah Sirk and artists Mike Van Cleave and Pete Von Sholly, it also features behind-the-scenes articles and interviews. The comic was reprinted for limited editions of the film published by French company ESC and Austrian-German company Plaion.
