= Bendon Publishing =

American children's book publisher

- Founded: 2001
- Founder: Ben Ferguson, Don Myers, Terry Gerwig
- Country of origin: United States
- Headquarters location: Ashland, Ohio
- Publication types: Books
- Owner(s): Irving Place Capital
- Official website: www.bendonpub.com

Bendon is an American publisher of children's books.

== History ==
In 2007, Kappa Books acquired a minority stake in Bendon.

In 2012, The Wicks Group purchased the majority stake in Bendon.

In 2013, Bendon had acquired Dalmatian Press.

In 2014, Bendon acquired Artistic Studios.

In 2015, Irving Place Capital acquired Bendon from The Wicks Group.

In 2017, Bendon and Kathy Ireland Worldwide extended their partnership.

In May 2019, Bendon partnered with Devar to make a series of four My Little Pony-branded, AR-enhanced coloring and activity books.
