= Campus Man =

- Theatrical release poster
- Directed by: Ron Casden
- Screenplay by: Geoffrey Baere; Matt Dorff
- Story by: Matt Dorff; Alex Horvat
- Produced by: Peggy Fowler; Jon Landau
- Starring: John Dye; Steven Lyon; Kim Delaney; Kathleen Wilhoite; Miles O'Keeffe; Morgan Fairchild
- Cinematography: Francis Kenny
- Edited by: Steve Polivka
- Music by: James Newton Howard
- Production company: RKO Pictures
- Distributed by: Paramount Pictures
- Release date: April 10, 1987
- Running time: 94 minutes
- Country: United States
- Language: English
- Budget: $4.9 million
- Box office: $989,528

Campus Man is a 1987 American comedy film directed by Ron Casden and written by Geoffrey Baere and Matt Dorff. The film stars John Dye, Steven Lyon, Kim Delaney, Kathleen Wilhoite, Miles O'Keeffe and Morgan Fairchild. The film was released on April 10, 1987, by Paramount Pictures.

== Plot ==
Todd Barrett is an aspiring businessman. He has got what it takes, but what he does not have is enough money to stay in college. So, he cooks up a plan to make the first-ever all-male sports calendar. He eventually convinces Cactus Jack, a very shadowy and tough loan shark, to give him money to make the deal. Todd makes enough to pay for his education, but what about the money he owes Cactus Jack?

== Cast ==
- John Dye as Todd Barrett
- Steven Lyon as Brett Wilson
- Kim Delaney as Dayna Thomas
- Kathleen Wilhoite as Molly Gibson
- Miles O'Keeffe as Cactus Jack
- Morgan Fairchild as Katherine Van Buren
- John Welsh as Professor Jarman
- Josef Rainer as Charles McCormick
- Richard Alexander as Mr. Bowersox
- Steve Archer as Coach Waters

== Reception ==
The film grossed $319,218 in its opening weekend.
