= Ken Kirzinger =

Canadian actor and stuntman (born 1959)

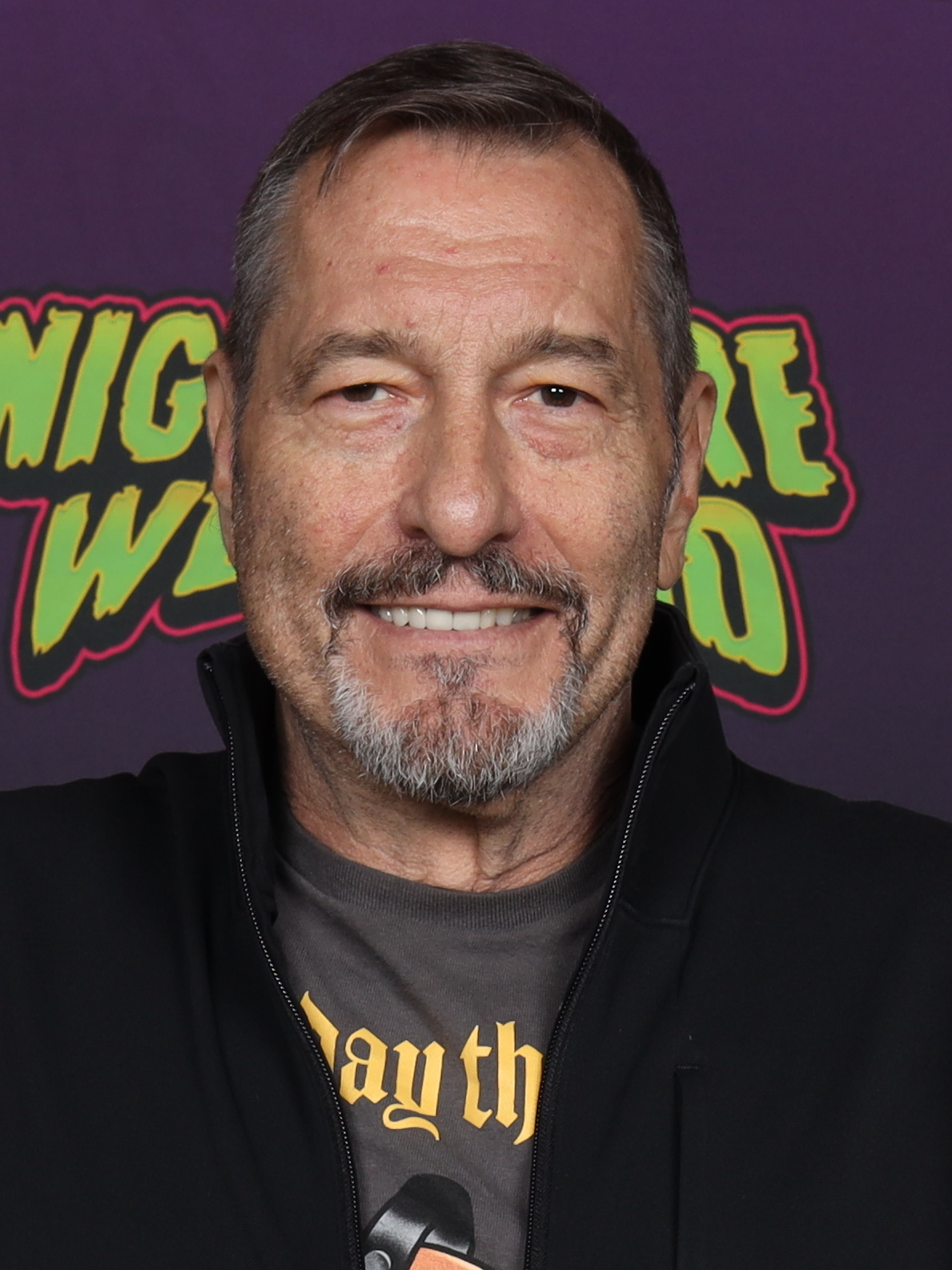
- Kirzinger in 2024
- Born: November 4, 1959 (age 67)
- Occupations: Actor; stuntman
- Years active: 1983–present

Kenneth Kirzinger (born November 4, 1959) is a Canadian actor and stuntman best known for his portrayals of Jason Voorhees in Freddy vs. Jason (2003), Pa in Wrong Turn 2: Dead End (2007), and Rusty Nail in Joy Ride 3: Roadkill (2014).

== Career ==
Kirzinger started his career as a stunt performer in the early 1980s, appearing in Superman III. He also worked as an actor in TV movies like Brotherly Love and Gunsmoke: Return to Dodge. Although he continued acting, Kirzinger became a prolific stunt performer and coordinator through the 80s and 90s working on films like Shoot to Kill, Look Who's Talking, Bird on a Wire, and It, as well as TV shows like 21 Jump Street and The Commish.

In 1989, Kirzinger had a small role as a New York cook on Friday the 13th Part VIII: Jason Takes Manhattan who gets in Jason's way while pursuing Rennie Wickham (Jensen Daggett) and Sean Robertson (Scott Reeves). Jason, played by Kane Hodder, threw Kirzinger over the counter. In addition to his role as the cook, Kirzinger served as a stunt coordinator for the film and also doubled for Jason during a few short scenes. This would make him only the second person besides Hodder to play Jason more than once during the course of the franchise.

=== Role as Jason Voorhees ===
In 2003, Kirzinger was chosen over Kane Hodder to play Jason Voorhees in the film Freddy vs. Jason. The decision was mostly based on him being slightly taller than Hodder. Although he was disappointed, Hodder and Kirzinger still remain friends. During filming of Freddy vs. Jason, director Ronny Yu tried to limit Kirzinger's stunts on the film as much as possible. Instead stuntman Glenn Ennis was called in to perform a series of stunts, including a stunt showing Jason walking through a field killing teenagers while on fire.

== Appearances ==
Kirzinger has performed stunts, or worked on the following:

=== TV shows ===
- Till Dad Do Us Part
- Boy Meets Girl
- Room Mates
- Sirens
- Sea Hunt
- MacGyver
- Bordertown (co-coordinator)
- Danger Bay (co-coordinator)
- Cadillac
- Neon Rider (co-coordinator)
- Memories of Murder
- Fly by Night (co-coordinator)
- Day Glow Warrior
- Rescue 911
- Max Glick
- Shame
- The X-Files
- Supernatural
- Psych (2 acting roles)

=== Movies ===
- Friday the 13th Part VIII: Jason Takes Manhattan (1989)
- Stay Tuned (re-shoots) (1992)
- White Fang 2: Myth of the White Wolf (co-coordinator) (1994)
- Ace Ventura: When Nature Calls (1995)
- Bad Moon (1996)
- Futuresport (1998)
- Firestorm (1998)
- The 13th Warrior (1999)
- Cats & Dogs (2001)
- Thirteen Ghosts (2001)
- Camouflage (2001)
- The Santa Clause 2 (2002)
- Insomnia (2002)
- Freddy vs. Jason (2003)
- Battle in Seattle (2007)
- Hot Rod (2007)
- Wrong Turn 2: Dead End (2007)
- Stan Helsing (2009)
- Joy Ride 3: Roadkill (2014)
- The Assignment (2016)

=== Movies for television with stunt performance credits ===
- Still Not Quite Human
- Omen IV: The Awakening
- My Son Johnny
- Blind Man's Bluff
- Brotherly Love
- Going for the Gold
- Betrayal of Trust
- General Alarm
- Sirens
- The Indestructible Man
- Perry Mason
- Force III
- It
- Deadly Intentions... Again?
- Barrington
- Christmas Comes to Willow Creek
- Gunsmoke: Return to Dodge
- Return of the Shaggy Dog
- Davy Crockett TV pilot
- Wiseguy TV pilot
- Stranger in My Bed
- Glory Days TV pilot
- Deadly Intentions
- Season of Fear
- A Mother's Justice
- Jumpin' Joe
- I Still Dream of Jeannie
- Diagnosis of Murder
- Love Binds

=== Documentaries ===
Year	Title	Role	Notes	Ref(s)
2009	His Name Was Jason: 30 Years of Friday the 13th	Himself	Film	
2013	Crystal Lake Memories: The Complete History of Friday the 13th	Himself	Film	
2026	Friday the 13th: Camp Crystal Legacy	Himself	Web series; 2 episodes	
