= Rusty Lemorande =

American film producer

Rusty Lemorande (born March 29, 1954) is an American screenwriter, director, actor and film producer. He directed the 1989 film Journey to the Center of the Earth based on the Jules Verne novel of the same name, as well as a 1992 adaptation of Henry James' The Turn of the Screw starring Patsy Kensit.

== Biography ==
One of Lemorande's first major jobs was production executive for the comedy Caddyshack. Lemorande proposed commissioning a gopher puppet in order to add, through additional shooting, a continuing story arc for the Gopher and the Bill Murray character. He was caught in the battle between screenwriter Doug Kenney and executive producer Jon Peters over Peters' insistence on a prominent role in the finished film for the famous gopher puppet, which was not part of the original script.

Lemorande soon joined up with Barbra Streisand to produce Yentl (1983), for which they shared a Golden Globe Award for Best Motion Picture – Musical or Comedy.

Lemorande wrote the film Electric Dreams, then followed it up by co-writing and producing with Francis Ford Coppola and George Lucas the Disney 3D theme-park film Captain EO, starring Michael Jackson. It was Lemorande who proposed adding physical effects (such as smoke, strobe lights and fiber optic stars) to the film. For this reason, Lemorande is often referred to as the Father of 4D.

Lemorande had a small speaking part in the film, and recently played the role of Father Lazarus in the Roland Joffé film There Be Dragons (2011), based on the life of Josemaría Escrivá, the founder of the Opus Dei religious order, which was largely shot in Argentina.

Lemorande's writing credits include an original screenplay entitled Quixote, which deals with Miguel de Cervantes five years as a slave and prisoner in Algeria prior to writing Don Quixote; Ben Kingsley intends to star in the film, which is set to be produced by his Lemorande's company SBK Productions.

== Bibliography ==
- Karp, Josh (2006). A Futile and Stupid Gesture: How Doug Kenney and National Lampoon Changed Comedy Forever. Chicago: Chicago Review Press. ISBN 1-55652-602-4.
