= Rozanne Zingale =

American film editor

- Born: July 11, 1961
- Other names: Rozanne Zingale Oriella
- Occupation(s): Film editor, Producer, Realtor

Rozanne Zingale is an American film editor and producer known for her work in feature films with director Albert Pyun. She resides in Ohio with her husband.

== Selected filmography ==
- Algiers (announced)
- Deceptions (1990)
- Cyborg (1989)
- Journey to the Center of the Earth (1988)
- Aloha Summer (1988) (assistant editor)
- Vicious Lips (1986)
- Wired to Kill (1986) (assistant editor)
- That's Life (1986) (assistant editor)
- The Ladies Club (1986) (assistant editor)
- Radioactive Dreams (1985) (assistant editor)
