= Vitaminsforyou =

Canadian electronic music project

- Origin: Winnipeg, Manitoba, Canada
- Genre: Electronic
- Years active: 1998–present
- Members: Bryce Kushnier

Vitaminsforyou is a Canadian electronic music project led by Bryce Kushnier, an early performer the "lo-fi bedroom electronics" genre of music. Originally based in Winnipeg, the band currently operates from Toronto, Ontario.

== History ==
Kushnier began creating music in 1998, using his home computer to fuse electronica, acoustic folk, and psychedelia. He later toured Canada, performing alone or with backup musicians.

He has worked with Lullabye Arkestra, Mitchell Akiyama, Emm Gryner, Ghislain Poirier, Montag, Hexes and Ohs, and Mike Feuerstack. He has also played for Winnipeg and Toronto filmmakers Matthew Etchies and Elvis Prusic and has created scores for Montreal choreographers Andrew Tay, Sasha Kleinplatz and Dana Michel.

Kushnier also played as a DJ in Toronto collectives Do Make Say Think and Fritz Helder & The Phantoms. Kushnier was awarded the Song of the Year Qwartz Pro/Art Electronic Music Award for the single "The Ukrainians".

In 2005, he released an EP, désolé monsieur soleil, c’est la neige qui va me libérer. Vitaminsforyou's 2006 album, The Legend of Bird's Hill, combined live drum beats with electronic rhythms and sampled sounds. The 2009 album he closed his eyes so he could dance with you was more dance-oriented than the project's previous releases. Kushnier toured in support of the album, including an appearance at the Ness Creek Festival.

== Discography ==
- I am Sorry for ever and for Always (2003)
- désolé monsieur soleil, c’est la neige qui va me libérer (2005)
- The Legend of Bird's Hill (2006)
- he closed his eyes so he could dance with you (2009)
